= 2007 World Championships in Athletics – Women's 800 metres =

Women's 800 metres at the 2007 World Championships
- Venue: Nagai Stadium
- Dates: 25 August (heats); 26 August (semifinals); 28 August (final)
- Competitors: 46 from 36 nations
- Winning time: 1:56.04

Medalists
gold medal	Janeth Jepkosgei; Kenya
silver medal	Hasna Benhassi; Morocco
bronze medal	Mayte Martínez; Spain

The women's 800 metres at the 2007 World Championships in Athletics was held at the Nagai Stadium on 25, 26 and 28 August.

== Medalists ==
Gold	Silver	Bronze
Janeth Jepkosgei; Kenya	Hasna Benhassi; Morocco	Mayte Martínez; Spain

== Schedule ==
Date	Time	Round
August 25, 2007	19:30	Heats
August 26, 2007	19:35	Semifinals
August 28, 2007	21:20	Final

== Results ==
KEY:	q	Fastest non-qualifiers	Q	Qualified	WR	World record	AR	Area record	NR	National record	PB	Personal best	SB	Seasonal best

=== Heats ===
Qualification: First 3 in each heat(Q) and the next 6 fastest(q) advance to the semifinals.

Rank	Heat	Name	Nationality	Time	Notes
1	6	Janeth Jepkosgei	Kenya	1:58.95	Q, SB
2	6	Mayte Martínez	Spain	1:59.58	Q, SB
3	6	Lucia Klocová	Slovakia	1:59.72	Q, PB
4	6	Agnes Samaria	Namibia	1:59.76	q, SB
5	5	Sviatlana Usovich	Belarus	1:59.95	Q, SB
6	3	Maria Mutola	Mozambique	2:00.00	Q
7	1	Svetlana Klyuka	Russia	2:00.11	Q
8	3	Jennifer Meadows	Great Britain	2:00.14	Q, PB
9	3	Brigita Langerholc	Slovenia	2:00.20	Q
10	4	Hasna Benhassi	Morocco	2:00.31	Q
11	5	Kenia Sinclair	Jamaica	2:00.35	Q
12	5	Diane Cummins	Canada	2:00.38	Q
13	6	Élodie Guégan	France	2:00.43	q, PB
14	3	Ewelina Sętowska-Dryk	Poland	2:00.45	q
14	5	Tetyana Petlyuk	Ukraine	2:00.45	q
16	4	Jemma Simpson	Great Britain	2:00.47	Q
17	1	Marian Burnett	Guyana	2:00.53	Q
18	3	Elisa Cusma Piccione	Italy	2:00.54	q
19	5	Hazel Clark	United States	2:00.61	q
20	4	Liliana Popescu	Romania	2:00.73	Q
21	5	Seltana Aït Hammou	Morocco	2:00.74	SB
22	1	Amina Aït Hammou	Morocco	2:00.85	Q, SB
23	6	Svetlana Cherkasova	Russia	2:00.93	
24	1	Mihaela Stancescu-Neacsu	Romania	2:01.08	
25	4	Tamsyn Lewis	Australia	2:01.21	
26	2	Olga Kotlyarova	Russia	2:01.75	Q
27	2	Marilyn Okoro	Great Britain	2:01.79	Q
28	2	Zulia Calatayud	Cuba	2:01.81	Q
29	2	Alysia Johnson	United States	2:02.11	
30	4	Yuliya Krevsun	Ukraine	2:02.45	
31	1	Alice Schmidt	United States	2:02.49	
32	2	Rosibel García	Colombia	2:02.86	
33	1	Josiane Tito	Brazil	2:03.70	
34	4	Rikke Rønholt	Denmark	2:03.75	SB
35	2	Qing Liu	China	2:04.35	
36	3	Eliane Saholinirina	Madagascar	2:06.57	PB
37	3	Fatimoh Muhammed	Liberia	2:07.28	NR
38	4	Ayako Jinnouchi	Japan	2:07.34	
39	2	Lillian Silva	Angola	2:09.17	
40	6	Elizet Banda	Zambia	2:09.90	
41	1	Natalia Gallego	Andorra	2:13.46	
42	1	Emilia Mikue Ondo	Equatorial Guinea	2:15.72	NR
43	6	Mireille Derebona	Central African Republic	2:30.08	SB
44	3	Gharid Ghrouf	Palestine	2:30.35	PB
45	5	Nicole Layson	Guam	2:36.14	
-	5	Marcela Britos	Uruguay	DNS	

=== Semifinals ===
Qualification: First 2 in each semifinal (Q) and the next 2 fastest (q) advance to the final.

Rank	Heat	Name	Nationality	Time	Notes
1	3	Janeth Jepkosgei	Kenya	1:56.17	Q, WL
2	3	Hasna Benhassi	Morocco	1:56.84	Q, SB
3	3	Maria Mutola	Mozambique	1:56.98	q, SB
4	1	Sviatlana Usovich	Belarus	1:58.11	Q, PB
5	3	Brigita Langerholc	Slovenia	1:58.41	q, PB
6	1	Olga Kotlyarova	Russia	1:58.56	Q
7	1	Lucia Klocová	Slovakia	1:58.62	PB
8	1	Elisa Cusma Piccione	Italy	1:58.63	PB
9	2	Svetlana Klyuka	Russia	1:58.97	Q
10	2	Mayte Martínez	Spain	1:59.32	Q, SB
11	3	Jennifer Meadows	Great Britain	1:59.39	PB
12	3	Élodie Guégan	France	1:59.46	PB
13	2	Amina Aït Hammou	Morocco	1:59.51	SB
14	2	Marilyn Okoro	Great Britain	1:59.63	PB
15	1	Liliana Popescu	Romania	2:00.07	SB
16	2	Kenia Sinclair	Jamaica	2:00.25	
17	1	Jemma Simpson	Great Britain	2:00.48	
18	1	Diane Cummins	Canada	2:00.51	
19	2	Tetyana Petlyuk	Ukraine	2:00.90	
20	3	Ewelina Sętowska-Dryk	Poland	2:01.02	
20	2	Marian Burnett	Guyana	2:01.02	
22	3	Agnes Samaria	Namibia	2:02.25	
23	1	Hazel Clark	United States	2:02.92	
24	2	Zulia Calatayud	Cuba	2:06.97	

=== Final ===
Rank	Name	Nationality	Time	Notes
1st place, gold medalist(s)	Janeth Jepkosgei	Kenya	1:56.04	WL, PB
2nd place, silver medalist(s)	Hasna Benhassi	Morocco	1:56.99	
3rd place, bronze medalist(s)	Mayte Martínez	Spain	1:57.62	PB
4	Olga Kotlyarova	Russia	1:58.22	
5	Brigita Langerholc	Slovenia	1:58.52	
6	Sviatlana Usovich	Belarus	1:58.92	
7	Svetlana Klyuka	Russia	2:00.90	
-	Maria Mutola	Mozambique	DNF	
