= Athletics at the 2004 Summer Olympics – Women's 800 metres =

Women's 800 metres at the Games of the XXVIII Olympiad
- Olympic Athletics
- Venue: Athens Olympic Stadium
- Dates: 20–23 August
- Competitors: 43 from 36 nations
- Winning time: 1:56.38

Medalists
1st place, gold medalist(s)		Kelly Holmes	Great Britain
2nd place, silver medalist(s)		Hasna Benhassi	Morocco
3rd place, bronze medalist(s)		Jolanda Čeplak	Slovenia

Official Video

The women's 800 metres at the 2004 Summer Olympics as part of the athletics program were held at the Athens Olympic Stadium from August 20 to 23.

The first round had split a full roster of runners into six heats with the first three gaining a direct qualification and then the next six fastest across all heats advancing to the semifinals. The top two runners in each of the three semifinal heats moved on directly to the final, and they were immediately joined by the next two fastest from any of the semifinals.

The final started with a fast first 200 metres, but Kelly Holmes and Maria de Lurdes Mutola were last at this stage. As the pace slowed, Mutola and Holmes moved forward through the field. The time at 400 metres was 56.37 seconds, with American Jearl Miles Clark leading. They entered the finishing straight with Mutola taking the lead, before Holmes took the lead and held off Mutola to take gold. Hasna Benhassi and Jolanda Čeplak finished strongly, both with a time of 1:56.43s, Benhassi winning silver in a photo finish. Mutola was forced into fourth place. Holmes' face lit up as she crossed the line, but then, unsure of the result, she anxiously waited for the times to come up.

Holmes had only decided to enter the 800 metres at the last moment, and went on to also win gold in her preferred event, the 1500 m. This feat made her one of the UK's most successful ever athletes; the Olympic 800–1500 metres double was never accomplished by any of their great 1980s middle distance trio, Sebastian Coe, Steve Ovett or Steve Cram.

== Records ==
Prior to the competition, the existing World record, Olympic record, and world leading time were as follows:

World record	Jarmila Kratochvílová (TCH)	1:53.28	Munich, West Germany	26 July 1983
Olympic record	Nadezhda Olizarenko (URS)	1:53.43	Moscow, Soviet Union	27 July 1980
World Leading	Tatyana Andrianova (RUS)	1:56.23	Tula, Russia	31 July 2004

No new records were set during the competition.

== Qualification ==
The qualification period for athletics was 1 January 2003 to 9 August 2004. For the women's 800 metres, each National Olympic Committee was permitted to enter up to three athletes that had run the race in 2:00.00 or faster during the qualification period. If an NOC had no athletes that qualified under that standard, one athlete that had run the race in 2:01.30 or faster could be entered.

== Schedule ==
All times are Eastern European Summer Time (UTC+3)

Date	Time	Round
Friday, 20 August 2004	22:00	Round 1
Saturday, 21 August 2004	20:40	Semifinals
Monday, 23 August 2004	20:55	Final

== Results ==
=== Round 1 ===
Qualification rule: The first three finishers in each heat (Q) plus the next six fastest overall runners (q) advanced to the semifinals.

==== Heat 1 ====
Rank	Lane	Athlete	Nation	Time	Notes
1	4	Hasna Benhassi	Morocco	2:01.20	Q
2	7	Maria de Lurdes Mutola	Mozambique	2:01.50	Q
3	2	Tetyana Petlyuk	Ukraine	2:02.07	Q
4	6	Marian Burnett	Guyana	2:02.12	q
5	8	Nédia Semedo	Portugal	2:02.61	
6	3	Olga Cristea	Moldova	2:08.97	
7	5	Marlyse Nsourou	Gabon	2:12.35	NR

==== Heat 2 ====
Rank	Lane	Athlete	Nation	Time	Notes
1	8	Maria Cioncan	Romania	1:59.64	Q, PB
2	5	Agnes Samaria	Namibia	2:00.05	Q
3	7	Élisabeth Grousselle	France	2:00.31	Q
4	3	Natalya Khrushchelyova	Russia	2:00.56	q
5	6	Diane Cummins	Canada	2:01.19	q
6	2	Miho Sugimori	Japan	2:02.82	
7	4	Adama Njie	The Gambia	2:10.02	

==== Heat 3 ====
Rank	Lane	Athlete	Nation	Time	Notes
1	3	Kelly Holmes	Great Britain	2:00.81	Q
2	1	Jearl Miles Clark	United States	2:01.33	Q
3	4	Michelle Ballentine	Jamaica	2:01.52	Q
4	7	Letitia Vriesde	Suriname	2:01.70	q
5	2	Tamsyn Lewis	Australia	2:02.67	
6	8	Tatyana Roslanova	Kazakhstan	2:06.39	
7	6	Sanna Abubkheet	Palestine	2:32.10	
	5	Anhel Cape	Guinea-Bissau	DNF	

==== Heat 4 ====
Rank	Lane	Athlete	Nation	Time	Notes
1	4	Svetlana Cherkasova	Russia	2:03.60	Q
2	2	Amina Aït Hammou	Morocco	2:03.70	Q
3	7	Joanne Fenn	Great Britain	2:03.72	Q
4	6	Claudia Gesell	Germany	2:03.87	
5	8	Akosua Serwaa	Ghana	2:03.96	
6	3	Faith Macharia	Kenya	2:06.31	
7	5	Emilia Mikue Ondo	Equatorial Guinea	2:22.88	

==== Heat 5 ====
Rank	Lane	Athlete	Nation	Time	Notes
1	3	Jolanda Čeplak	Slovenia	2:00.61	Q
2	2	Mayte Martínez	Spain	2:00.81	Q
3	6	Nicole Teter	United States	2:01.16	Q
4	4	Luciana de Paula Mendes	Brazil	2:01.36	q
5	7	Lucia Klocová	Slovakia	2:02.17	q
6	8	Binnaz Uslu	Turkey	2:03.46	
7	5	Marie-Lyne Joseph	Dominica	2:20.23	

==== Heat 6 ====
Rank	Lane	Athlete	Nation	Time	Notes
1	3	Tatyana Andrianova	Russia	2:03.77	Q
2	6	Seltana Aït Hammou	Morocco	2:03.95	Q
3	8	Zulia Calatayud	Cuba	2:03.99	Q
4	5	Anita Brägger	Switzerland	2:04.00	
5	2	Hazel Clark	United States	2:05.67	
6	4	Noelly Mankatu Bibiche	Democratic Republic of the Congo	2:06.23	
7	7	Tanya Blake	Malta	2:19.34	

=== Semifinals ===
Qualification rule: The top two finishers in each heat (Q) plus the next two fastest overall runners (q) advanced to the final.

==== Semifinal 1 ====
Rank	Lane	Athlete	Nation	Time	Notes
1	4	Kelly Holmes	Great Britain	1:57.98	Q, SB
2	6	Tatyana Andrianova	Russia	1:58.41	Q
3	5	Jearl Miles Clark	United States	1:58.71	q
4	3	Zulia Calatayud	Cuba	1:59.21	q, SB
5	7	Agnes Samaria	Namibia	1:59.37	SB
6	2	Élisabeth Grousselle	France	2:00.21	
7	1	Amina Aït Hammou	Morocco	2:00.66	
8	8	Michelle Ballentine	Jamaica	2:00.94	

==== Semifinal 2 ====
Rank	Lane	Athlete	Nation	Time	Notes
1	6	Hasna Benhassi	Morocco	1:58.59	Q, SB
2	4	Jolanda Čeplak	Slovenia	1:58.80	Q
3	8	Tetyana Petlyuk	Ukraine	1:59.48	PB
4	3	Nicole Teter	United States	1:59.50	
5	5	Natalya Khrushchelyova	Russia	2:00.68	
6	7	Lucia Klocová	Slovakia	2:00.79	SB
7	2	Marian Burnett	Guyana	2:02.21	
8	1	Mayte Martínez	Spain	2:03.30	

==== Semifinal 3 ====
Rank	Lane	Athlete	Nation	Time	Notes
1	5	Maria de Lurdes Mutola	Mozambique	1:59.30	Q
2	7	Maria Cioncan	Romania	1:59.44	Q, PB
3	3	Svetlana Cherkasova	Russia	1:59.80	
4	4	Diane Cummins	Canada	2:00.30	
5	8	Joanne Fenn	Great Britain	2:00.60	
6	2	Seltana Aït Hammou	Morocco	2:00.64	
7	1	Luciana de Paula Mendes	Brazil	2:02.00	
8	6	Letitia Vriesde	Suriname	2:06.95	

=== Final ===
Rank	Lane	Athlete	Nation	Time	Notes
1st place, gold medalist(s)	3	Kelly Holmes	Great Britain	1:56.38	SB
2nd place, silver medalist(s)	7	Hasna Benhassi	Morocco	1:56.43	NR
3rd place, bronze medalist(s)	4	Jolanda Čeplak	Slovenia	1:56.43	SB
4	5	Maria de Lurdes Mutola	Mozambique	1:56.51	SB
5	6	Tatyana Andrianova	Russia	1:56.88	
6	2	Jearl Miles Clark	United States	1:57.27	SB
7	1	Maria Cioncan	Romania	1:59.62	
8	8	Zulia Calatayud	Cuba	2:00.95	
