= 2003 World Championships in Athletics – Women's 800 metres =

Women's 800 metres at the 2003 World Championships
- Venue: Stade de France
- Dates: 23 August (heats); 24 August (semifinals); 26 August (final)
- Competitors: 41 from 32 nations
- Winning time: 1:59.89

Medalists
gold medal	Maria de Lurdes Mutola; Mozambique
silver medal	Kelly Holmes; Great Britain & N.I.
bronze medal	Natalya Khrushcheleva; Russia

These are the official results of the Women's 800 metres event at the 2003 IAAF World Championships in Paris, France. There were a total number of 41 participating athletes, with five qualifying heats, three semi-finals and the final held on Tuesday 26 August 2003 at 20:50h.

== Final ==
RANK	FINAL	TIME
	Maria de Lurdes Mutola (MOZ)	1:59.89
	Kelly Holmes (GBR)	2:00.18
	Natalya Khrushcheleva (RUS)	2:00.29
4.	Mina Aït Hammou (MAR)	2:01.09
5.	Claudia Gesell (GER)	2:01.84
6.	Diane Cummins (CAN)	2:02.48
7.	Akosua Serwaa (GHA)	2:03.24
—	Stephanie Graf (AUT)	DNS

== Semi-final ==
- Held on Sunday 24 August 2003

RANK	HEAT 1	TIME
1.	Stephanie Graf (AUT)	1:59.26
2.	Natalya Khrushcheleva (RUS)	1:59.39
3.	Joanne Fenn (GBR)	2:00.56
4.	Letitia Vriesde (SUR)	2:00.88
5.	Faith Macharia (KEN)	2:01.30
6.	Brigita Langerholc (SLO)	2:01.58
7.	Jen Toomey (USA)	2:02.35
8.	Tamsyn Lewis (AUS)	2:05.11

RANK	HEAT 2	TIME
1.	Maria de Lurdes Mutola (MOZ)	1:58.45
2.	Kelly Holmes (GBR)	1:58.86
3.	Diane Cummins (CAN)	1:59.58
4.	Akosua Serwaa (GHA)	2:00.42
5.	Maria Cioncan (ROU)	2:00.72
6.	Lucia Klocová (SVK)	2:00.73
7.	Natalya Yevdokimova (RUS)	2:01.17
8.	Heidi Jensen (DEN)	2:01.73

RANK	HEAT 3	TIME
1.	Mina Aït Hammou (MAR)	2:00.57
2.	Claudia Gesell (GER)	2:01.01
3.	Seltana Aït Hammou (MAR)	2:01.34
4.	Svetlana Klyuka (RUS)	2:01.61
5.	Tina Paulino (MOZ)	2:01.85
6.	Judit Varga (HUN)	2:02.20
7.	Anita Brägger (SUI)	2:02.34
8.	Agnes Samaria (NAM)	2:02.66

== Heats ==
Held on Sunday 24 August 2003

RANK	HEAT 1	TIME
1.	Natalya Yevdokimova (RUS)	2:01.05
2.	Mina Aït Hammou (MAR)	2:01.10
3.	Judit Varga (HUN)	2:01.47
4.	Jen Toomey (USA)	2:01.75
5.	Heidi Jensen (DEN)	2:02.01
6.	Esther Desviat (ESP)	2:03.42
7.	Charlotte Moore (GBR)	2:03.80
8.	Marie-Lyne Joseph (DMA)	2:17.73

RANK	HEAT 2	TIME
1.	Maria de Lurdes Mutola (MOZ)	2:00.81
2.	Claudia Gesell (GER)	2:01.06
3.	Lucia Klocová (SVK)	2:01.14
4.	Joanne Fenn (GBR)	2:01.27
5.	Faith Macharia (KEN)	2:01.36
6.	Agnes Samaria (NAM)	2:01.51
7.	Brigita Langerholc (SLO)	2:01.55
8.	Noelly Bibiche Mankatu (COD)	2:07.12
9.	Uyanga Khaynkhirvaa (MGL)	2:27.96

RANK	HEAT 3	TIME
1.	Natalya Khrushcheleva (RUS)	2:03.74
2.	Kelly Holmes (GBR)	2:03.75
3.	Maria Cioncan (ROU)	2:03.90
4.	Jearl Miles Clark (USA)	2:04.21
5.	Abir Nakhli (TUN)	2:04.43
6.	Adriana Muñoz (CUB)	2:04.58
7.	Sandra Stals (BEL)	2:06.12
8.	Adama Njie (GAM)	2:17.04

RANK	HEAT 4	TIME
1.	Stephanie Graf (AUT)	2:03.39
2.	Svetlana Klyuka (RUS)	2:03.68
3.	Seltana Aït Hammou (MAR)	2:04.01
4.	Tanya Blake (MLT)	2:04.61
5.	Yuliya Krevsun (UKR)	2:04.93
6.	Tatjana Borisova (KGZ)	2:05.31
7.	Myint Myint Aye (MYA)	2:05.41
8.	Tatyana Roslanova (KAZ)	2:07.98

RANK	HEAT 5	TIME
1.	Tina Paulino (MOZ)	2:01.06
2.	Anita Brägger (SUI)	2:01.09
3.	Akosua Serwaa (GHA)	2:01.17
4.	Diane Cummins (CAN)	2:01.20
5.	Letitia Vriesde (SUR)	2:01.24
6.	Tamsyn Lewis (AUS)	2:01.43
7.	Wesam Abubkheet (PLE)	2:29.86
—	Jolanda Čeplak (SLO)	DNS

== See also ==
- Athletics at the 2003 Pan American Games – Women's 800 metres
