= Athletics at the 2001 Summer Universiade – Women's 800 metres =

The women's 800 metres event at the 2001 Summer Universiade was held at the Workers Stadium in Beijing, China between 30 August and 1 September.

== Medalists ==
Gold	Silver	Bronze
Brigita Langerholc; Slovenia	Nédia Semedo; Portugal	Tatyana Rodionova; Russia

== Results ==
=== Heats ===
Rank	Heat	Athlete	Nationality	Time	Notes
1	5	Nédia Semedo	Portugal	2:02.68	Q
2	4	Sasha Spencer	United States	2:03.36	Q
3	4	Irina Krakoviak	Lithuania	2:03.46	Q
4	4	Wang Yuanping	China	2:03.58	q
5	3	Tatyana Rodionova	Russia	2:03.78	Q
6	3	Anna Zagórska	Poland	2:04.18	Q
7	6	Brigita Langerholc	Slovenia	2:04.82	Q
8	3	Miriam Bravo	Spain	2:04.85	q
9	1	Natallia Dziadkova	Belarus	2:04.87	Q
10	1	Miki Nishimura	Japan	2:05.33	Q
11	6	Anjolie Wisse	Netherlands	2:05.36	Q
12	6	Tamieka Grizzle	United States	2:05.95	q
13	2	Mina Aït Hammou	Morocco	2:06.09	Q
14	2	Aoife Byrne	Ireland	2:06.14	Q
15	5	Kristin Roset	Norway	2:06.15	Q
16	1	Lisbeth Pedersen	Norway	2:06.21	q
17	4	Irina Someşan	Romania	2:06.49	
18	2	Alexandra Carter	Great Britain	2:06.50	
19	3	Yang Wei	China	2:06.54	
20	1	Jouma Kekana	South Africa	2:07.01	
21	6	Sara Palmas	Italy	2:07.57	
22	1	Yuliya Gurtovenko	Ukraine	2:07.86	
23	5	Petra Sedláková	Czech Republic	2:08.23	
24	2	Victoria Moradeyo	Nigeria	2:08.40	
25	1	Michelle Prowse	New Zealand	2:08.64	
26	2	Irina Latve	Latvia	2:09.11	
27	4	Anna Anfinogentova	Latvia	2:09.43	
28	5	Khadija Touati	Algeria	2:10.69	
29	3	Tanya Wright	Canada	2:14.08	
30	6	Fiona Crombie	New Zealand	2:14.69	
31	2	Madeleine Firita	Chad	2:17.12	
32	3	Evelyn Rojas	Costa Rica	2:17.54	
33	5	Maysa Hussein Matrood	Iraq	2:20.47	
34	4	Rossana Rodríguez	Costa Rica	2:23.14	
35	6	P. N. Somaratne	Sri Lanka	2:28.44	
36	5	Biye Engura	Equatorial Guinea	2:46.69	

=== Semifinals ===
Rank	Heat	Athlete	Nationality	Time	Notes
1	1	Brigita Langerholc	Slovenia	2:03.25	Q
2	1	Anna Zagórska	Poland	2:03.32	Q
3	1	Miki Nishimura	Japan	2:03.73	Q
4	1	Nédia Semedo	Portugal	2:03.84	q
5	1	Natallia Dziadkova	Belarus	2:04.47	q
6	2	Miriam Bravo	Spain	2:04.68	Q
7	2	Tatyana Rodionova	Russia	2:04.69	Q
8	2	Sasha Spencer	United States	2:04.75	Q
9	2	Aoife Byrne	Ireland	2:04.97	
10	2	Irina Krakoviak	Lithuania	2:05.00	
11	1	Tamieka Grizzle	United States	2:05.12	
12	2	Mina Aït Hammou	Morocco	2:05.15	
13	2	Anjolie Wisse	Netherlands	2:05.50	
14	2	Lisbeth Pedersen	Norway	2:06.45	
15	1	Wang Yuanping	China	2:06.77	
16	1	Kristin Roset	Norway	2:07.52	

=== Final ===
Rank	Athlete	Nationality	Time	Notes
1st place, gold medalist(s)	Brigita Langerholc	Slovenia	2:00.96	
2nd place, silver medalist(s)	Nédia Semedo	Portugal	2:01.64	
3rd place, bronze medalist(s)	Tatyana Rodionova	Russia	2:01.68	
4	Anna Zagórska	Poland	2:02.21	
5	Sasha Spencer	United States	2:02.68	
6	Miriam Bravo	Spain	2:03.35	
7	Miki Nishimura	Japan	2:06.65	
8	Natallia Dziadkova	Belarus	2:08.21	
