= 2002 African Championships in Athletics – Women's 800 metres =

The women's 800 metres event at the 2002 African Championships in Athletics was held in Radès, Tunisia on August 6–7.

== Medalists ==
Gold	Silver	Bronze
Maria Mutola; Mozambique	Agnes Samaria; Namibia	Amina Aït Hammou; Morocco

== Results ==
=== Heats ===
Rank	Heat	Name	Nationality	Time	Notes
1	1	Maria Mutola	Mozambique	2:03.89	Q
2	1	Amina Aït Hammou	Morocco	2:04.12	Q
3	1	Agnes Samaria	Namibia	2:04.15	Q
4	1	Amel Tlili	Tunisia	2:06.38	q
5	2	Abir Nakhli	Tunisia	2:07.33	Q
6	2	Seltana Aït Hammou	Morocco	2:07.49	Q
7	2	Nahida Touhami	Algeria	2:07.71	Q
8	1	Berhane Herpassa	Ethiopia	2:08.07	q
9	2	Tsmoilelo Morama	Botswana	2:08.60	
10	2	Maskerem Lagesse	Ethiopia	2:09.77	
11	2	Lemlem Bereket	Eritrea	2:10.14	
12	2	Lamberte Nyabamikazi	Burundi	2:16.59	
13	1	Marlyse Nsourou	Gabon	2:20.79	
	1	Kadie Koroma	Sierra Leone	DNS	
	1	Ntoto Mankatu	Democratic Republic of the Congo	DNS	
	1	Akosua Sewah	Ghana	DNS	
	2	Faith Macharia	Kenya	DNS	
	2	Euridice Borges Semedo	São Tomé and Príncipe	DNS	
	2	Léontine Tsiba	Republic of the Congo	DNS	

=== Final ===
Rank	Name	Nationality	Time	Notes
1st place, gold medalist(s)	Maria Mutola	Mozambique	2:03.11	
2nd place, silver medalist(s)	Agnes Samaria	Namibia	2:03.63	
3rd place, bronze medalist(s)	Amina Aït Hammou	Morocco	2:03.94	
4	Abir Nakhli	Tunisia	2:04.32	
5	Seltana Aït Hammou	Morocco	2:04.76	
6	Nahida Touhami	Algeria	2:07.01	
7	Berhane Herpassa	Ethiopia	2:08.11	
8	Amel Tlili	Tunisia	2:08.53	
