= 2008 IAAF World Indoor Championships – Women's 800 metres =

== Medalists ==
Gold
| Tamsyn Lewis | Australia |
Silver
| Tetiana Petlyuk | Ukraine |
Bronze
| Maria de Lurdes Mutola | Mozambique |

== Heats ==
| Heat | Lane | Name | Country | Mark | Q |
|---|---|---|---|---|---|
| 1 | 1 | Elisa Cusma Piccione | Italy | 2:01.62 | Q |
| 1 | 2 | Tamsyn Lewis | Australia | 2:01.85 NR | Q |
| 1 | 3 | Marian Burnett | Guyana | 2:02.35 NR | q |
| 1 | 4 | Margarita Fuentes-Pila | Spain | 2:03.89 SB | q |
| 1 | | Natalya Ignatova | Russia | DSQ | |
| 2 | 1 | Maria de Lurdes Mutola | Mozambique | 2:04.82 | Q |
| 2 | 2 | Mayte Martínez | Spain | 2:04.92 | Q |
| 2 | 3 | Agnes Samaria | Namibia | 2:05.23 SB | |
| 2 | 4 | Nicole Cook | United States | 2:06.67 | |
| 2 | 5 | Fanja Rakotomalala-Felix | Madagascar | 2:08.42 NR | |
| 3 | 1 | Seltana Aït Hammou | Morocco | 2:04.69 | Q |
| 3 | 2 | Ewelina Sętowska-Dryk | Poland | 2:04.71 | Q |
| 3 | 3 | Marilyn Okoro | United Kingdom | 2:05.09 | |
| 3 | 4 | Mariya Savinova | Russia | 2:06.72 | |
| 3 | 5 | Lysaira Del Valle | Puerto Rico | 2:07.58 SB | |
| 4 | 1 | Tetiana Petlyuk | Ukraine | 2:00.40 | Q |
| 4 | 2 | Jennifer Meadows | United Kingdom | 2:00.60 | Q |
| 4 | 3 | Mihaela Neacsu | Romania | 2:00.79 SB | q |
| 4 | 4 | Nicole Teter | United States | 2:01.73 SB | q |
| 4 | 5 | Natalia Gallego | Andorra | 2:15.97 | |

== Semifinals ==
| Heat | Lane | Name | Country | Mark | Q |
|---|---|---|---|---|---|
| 1 | 1 | Maria de Lurdes Mutola | Mozambique | 2:01.81 | Q |
| 1 | 2 | Mayte Martínez | Spain | 2:01.86 | Q |
| 1 | 3 | Tamsyn Lewis | Australia | 2:02.07 | Q |
| 1 | 4 | Ewelina Sętowska-Dryk | Poland | 2:02.38 | |
| 1 | 5 | Nicole Teter | United States | 2:04.72 | |
| 1 | 6 | Seltana Aït Hammou | Morocco | DSQ | |
| 2 | 1 | Tetiana Petlyuk | Ukraine | 1:59.58 SB | Q |
| 2 | 2 | Jennifer Meadows | United Kingdom | 1:59.73 PB | Q |
| 2 | 3 | Elisa Cusma Piccione | Italy | 2:00.36 NR | Q |
| 2 | 4 | Mihaela Neacsu | Romania | 2:01.70 | |
| 2 | 5 | Marian Burnett | Guyana | 2:02.27 NR | |
| 2 | 6 | Margarita Fuentes-Pila | Spain | 2:05.58 SB | |

== Final ==
| Heat | Lane | Name | Country | Mark |
|---|---|---|---|---|
| Gold medal | 1 | Tamsyn Lewis | Australia | 2:02.57 |
| Silver medal | 5 | Tetiana Petlyuk | Ukraine | 2:02.66 |
| Bronze medal | 2 | Maria de Lurdes Mutola | Mozambique | 2:02.97 |
| 4 | 6 | Mayte Martínez | Spain | 2:03.15 |
| 5 | 4 | Jennifer Meadows | United Kingdom | 2:03.51 |
| 6 | 3 | Elisa Cusma Piccione | Italy | 2:03.76 |

| Intermediate | Athlete | Country | Mark |
|---|---|---|---|
| 200m | Maria de Lurdes Mutola | Mozambique | 30.24 |
| 400m | Maria de Lurdes Mutola | Mozambique | 1:03.11 |
| 600m | Tetiana Petlyuk | Ukraine | 1:34.14 |
