= Halima Hachlaf =

Moroccan runner (born 1988)

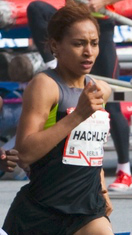
- Hachlaf in 2012

Personal information
- Born: 6 September 1988 (age 38) Khénifra, Morocco
Medal record
Women's athletics
Representing Morocco
Mediterranean Games
Silver medal – second place	2009 Pescara	800 m
Jeux de la Francophonie
Silver medal – second place	2009 Beirut	800 m

Halima Hachlaf (born 6 September 1988) is a Moroccan runner who specializes in the 800 metres. She is the younger sister of Abdelkader Hachlaf, an international steeplechase athlete. She won silver medals in the 800 m at the Mediterranean Games and Jeux de la Francophonie in 2009. Her personal best for the distance is 1:58.27.

Hachlaf has been banned twice during her career for doping and is currently serving a six-year suspension set to expire in April 2027.

== Junior career ==
Hachlaf was born in Khénifra, and began her international career at an early age, competing in the 800 metres at the 2003 World Youth Championships in Athletics when she was fourteen. She qualified for the semi-finals but did not manage to finish the race. She had greater success at the 2004 World Junior Championships the following year, as she recorded a personal best of 2:06.44 in the heats and reached the event final, finishing ninth. In 2005, she entered the IAAF World Cross Country Championships for the first time and was 31st overall in the junior race. At the 2005 World Youth Championships she won her heat and recorded a season's best of 2:06.91 to finish as runner-up in the semi-final behind Teresa Kwamboka. She failed to repeat this form in the final and was fourth in a time of 2:08.61. At the end of the year she competed at the 2005 Jeux de la Francophonie, and won a bronze medal in the 4×400 metres relay.

She was first in the 400 metres at the African Northern Region Junior Championships in July 2006, but was beaten into second by Aicha Rezig in her speciality. She reached the semi-finals of the 2006 World Junior Championships in Athletics and ran at the 2007 IAAF World Cross Country Championships, taking 46th place. Later that year, she ran a personal best of 2:02.60 at a meeting in Biberach, Germany – a mark which made her the third fastest junior woman that year. She won two medals at the 2007 African Junior Championships in Athletics, taking the silver in the 800 m and a bronze in the 1500 metres. The highlight 2008 for Hachlaf was a fourth-place finish at the 2008 African Championships, where she finished in a time of 2:04.74 behind Agnes Samaria.

== Senior breakthrough ==
The 2009 season brought significant improvements for Hachlaf. She set a new best time of 2:00.91 for the silver medal at the 2009 Mediterranean Games, although she was somewhat behind Elisa Cusma who set a Games record. She competed at her first global senior competition the following month, the 2009 World Championships in Athletics. Hachlaf recorded the fifth fastest qualifying time in the heats stage, but she did not manage to finish the semi-finals, dropping out mid-race. She closed her year with an appearance at the 2009 Jeux de la Francophonie, where she won another silver medal, just beaten by her compatriot Seltana Aït Hammou. On the final day of the competition she took the bronze medal for Morocco in the 4×400 m relay.

The Moroccan made her first global indoor appearance at the 2010 IAAF World Indoor Championships in March, but missed out on qualification in the heats stage. At the start of the outdoor season she scored an unexpected win over her compatriot Hasna Benhassi at the Meeting International Mohammed VI d'Athlétisme de Rabat in a personal best run of 2:00.63. A few days later she ran at the Golden Gala in Rome and had a significant victory over World Championship medallists Janeth Jepkosgei and Jenny Meadows. She comfortably won in a time of 1:58.40 at the Diamond League meeting, improving her best by over two seconds and scoring her first major win of her career.

== Anti-doping rule violations ==
She served a 4-year competition ban, as a result of abnormalities in her biological passport, lasting from 14 October 2013 to 18 December 2017. This made her the second athlete in her family to receive a doping ban, as her brother Abdelkader Hachlaf was banned for doping in 2004.

In November 2021, Hachlaf was issued with a six-year ban to expire in April 2017 for an anti-doping rule violation after testing positive for methylprednisolone following an in-competition test in January 2021.

== Personal bests ==
Event	Time (min)	Venue	Date
800 m	1:58.27	Oslo, Norway	9 June 2011
1500 m	4:06.69	Rabat, Morocco	9 June 2013

- All information taken from IAAF profile.

== Achievements ==
Year	Competition	Venue	Position	Event	Notes
Representing Morocco
2003	World Youth Championships	Sherbrooke, Canada	21st (h)	800 m	2:12.66
2004	World Junior Championships	Grosseto, Italy	9th	800 m	2:09.26
2005	World Cross Country Championships	Saint-Galmier, France	31st	Junior race (6.153 km)	22:42
2005	World Youth Championships	Marrakesh, Morocco	4th	800 m	2:08.61
2005	Francophonie Games	Niamey, Niger	4th	800 m	2:09.64
2005	Francophonie Games	Niamey, Niger	3rd	4 × 400 m relay	3:42.48
2006	World Junior Championships	Beijing, China	12th (sf)	800 m	2:07.07
2007	World Cross Country Championships	Mombasa, Kenya	46th	Junior race (6 km)	24:01
2007	African Junior Championships	Ouagadougou, Burkina Faso	2nd	800 m	2:06.13
2007	African Junior Championships	Ouagadougou, Burkina Faso	3rd	1500 m	4:20.91
2007	Pan Arab Games	Cairo, Egypt	3rd	800 m	2:09.50
2008	African Championships	Addis Ababa, Ethiopia	4th	800 m	2:04.74
2009	Mediterranean Games	Pescara, Italy	2nd	800 m	2:00.91
2009	World Championships	Berlin, Germany	23rd (sf)	800 m	DNF
2009	Francophonie Games	Beirut, Lebanon	2nd	800 metres	2:02.76
2009	Francophonie Games	Beirut, Lebanon	3rd	4 × 400 m relay	3:37.72
2010	World Indoor Championships	Doha, Qatar	8th (h)	800 m	2:03.81
2010	African Championships	Nairobi, Kenya	8th	800 m	DNF
2011	World Championships	Daegu, South Korea	24th (sf)	800 m	DNF
2012	Olympic Games	London, United Kingdom	11th (sf)	800 m	11th
2013	World Championships	Moscow, Russia	11th (sf)	800 m	11th
