= Athletics at the 1999 Summer Universiade – Women's 800 metres =

The women's 800 metres event at the 1999 Summer Universiade was held on 9, 10, and 12 July at the Estadio Son Moix in Palma de Mallorca, Spain.

== Medalists ==
Gold	Silver	Bronze
Yuliya Taranova; Russia	Brigita Langerholc; Slovenia	Elena Buhăianu; Romania

== Results ==
=== Heat ===
Rank	Heat	Athlete	Nationality	Time	Notes
1	4	Elena Buhăianu	Romania	2:07.08	Q
2	4	Mina Ait Hammou	Morocco	2:07.21	Q, PB
3	4	Mary Jayne Harrelson	United States	2:07.29	Q
4	4	Süreyya Ayhan	Turkey	2:07.47	q
5	2	Miriam Bravo	Spain	2:07.67	Q
6	2	Laetitia Valdonado	France	2:07.72	Q
7	3	Yuliya Taranova	Russia	2:07.80	Q
8	3	Iryna Lishchynska	Ukraine	2:07.80	Q
9	3	Brigita Langerholc	Slovenia	2:07.88	Q
10	3	Hazel Clark	United States	2:07.92	q
11	1	Olena Buzhenko	Ukraine	2:08.09	Q
12	1	Mioara Cosuleanu	Romania	2:08.11	Q
13	2	Jeannette Castro	Mexico	2:08.12	Q
14	1	Elisabetta Artuso	Italy	2:08.14	Q
15	2	Emma Davies	Great Britain	2:08.25	q
16	3	Åsa Hedström	Sweden	2:08.50	q
17	2	Marie-Louise Henning	South Africa	2:08.90	
18	4	Kelly Edge	New Zealand	2:09.46	SB
19	3	Anna Anfinogentova	Latvia	2:10.22	
20	1	Zakia Boutallilte	Morocco	2:13.21	
21	1	Agathe Wanjiku Gitundu	Kenya	2:13.48	PB
22	4	Veslemøy Hausken	Norway	2:13.52	
23	3	Malebogo Moyanpi	Botswana	2:14.14	
24	1	Andrea Grove	Canada	2:30.33	
	2	Si I Fong	Macau	DNS	
	4	Nathalie Côté	Canada	DNS	

=== Semifinals ===
Rank	Heat	Athlete	Nationality	Time	Notes
1	1	Brigita Langerholc	Slovenia	2:00.68	Q
2	1	Yuliya Taranova	Russia	2:00.73	Q, SB
3	1	Iryna Lishchynska	Ukraine	2:02.36	Q
4	1	Miriam Bravo	Spain	2:03.15	q, SB
5	2	Elena Buhăianu	Romania	2:03.19	Q
6	2	Olena Buzhenko	Ukraine	2:03.36	Q
7	2	Laetitia Valdonado	France	2:03.65	Q
8	2	Mina Ait Hammou	Morocco	2:03.76	q, PB
9	2	Mary Jayne Harrelson	United States	2:03.97	PB
10	1	Emma Davies	Great Britain	2:04.00	
11	1	Jeannette Castro	Mexico	2:04.70	
12	2	Åsa Hedström	Sweden	2:04.80	
13	1	Mioara Cosuleanu	Romania	2:05.08	
14	2	Süreyya Ayhan	Turkey	2:06.72	
15	2	Elisabetta Artuso	Italy	2:07.79	
	1	Hazel Clark	United States	DQ	

=== Final ===
Rank	Athlete	Nationality	Time	Notes
1st place, gold medalist(s)	Yuliya Taranova	Russia	1:59.63	
2nd place, silver medalist(s)	Brigita Langerholc	Slovenia	1:59.87	
3rd place, bronze medalist(s)	Elena Buhăianu	Romania	2:00.26	
4	Olena Buzhenko	Ukraine	2:00.96	
5	Laetitia Valdonado	France	2:01.97	
6	Miriam Bravo	Spain	2:04.68	
7	Mina Ait Hammou	Morocco	2:06.00	
	Iryna Lishchynska	Ukraine	DNS	
