= 2001 World Championships in Athletics – Women's 800 metres =

These are the official results of the Women's 800 metres event at the 2001 IAAF World Championships in Edmonton, Canada. The winning margin was 0.03 seconds which as of 2024 remains the narrowest winning margin in the women's 800 metres at these championships.

== Medalists ==
Gold	Maria Mutola; Mozambique (MOZ)
Silver	Stephanie Graf; Austria (AUT)
Bronze	Letitia Vriesde; Suriname (SUR)

== Results ==
=== Heats ===
Qualification: First 3 in each heat (Q) and the next 4 fastest (q) advanced to the semifinals.

Rank	Heat	Name	Nationality	Time	Notes
1	3	Letitia Vriesde	Suriname	1:59.51	Q
2	1	Maria Mutola	Mozambique	1:59.96	Q
3	1	Kelly Holmes	Great Britain	2:00.08	Q
4	1	Diane Cummins	Canada	2:00.46	Q
5	1	Jolanda Čeplak	Slovenia	2:00.46	q
6	1	Hazel Clark	United States	2:00.56	q, SB
7	1	Anita Brägger	Switzerland	2:00.65	q
8	1	Tamsyn Lewis	Australia	2:00.86	q, SB
9	3	Zulia Calatayud	Cuba	2:00.96	Q
10	3	Svetlana Cherkasova	Russia	2:00.97	Q
11	3	Brigita Langerholc	Slovenia	2:01.05	
12	4	Stephanie Graf	Austria	2:01.78	Q
13	4	Mayte Martínez	Spain	2:01.98	Q
14	4	Svetlana Badrankova	Kazakhstan	2:02.19	Q
15	3	Peggy Babin	France	2:02.48	
16	4	Irina Mistyukevich	Russia	2:02.50	
17	3	Agnes Samaria	Namibia	2:03.11	
18	2	Faith Macharia	Kenya	2:03.83	Q
19	2	Ivonne Teichmann	Germany	2:04.03	Q
20	2	Luciana Mendes	Brazil	2:04.16	Q
21	4	Grace Birungi	Uganda	2:04.26	
22	2	Lwiza John	Tanzania	2:04.31	
23	2	Natalya Tsyganova	Russia	2:04.55	
24	3	Charmaine Howell	Jamaica	2:05.06	
25	2	Natalya Dukhnova	Belarus	2:05.47	
26	2	Tatjana Borisova	Kyrgyzstan	2:05.63	
27	4	Tina Paulino	Mozambique	2:06.36	
28	2	Adama Njie	Gambia	2:07.80	
29	3	Mariela Alvarez	Peru	2:09.43	PB
30	3	Janill Williams	Netherlands Antilles	2:15.04	
31	1	Hind Musa	Sudan	2:27.96	
	4	Tsvetelina Kirilova	Bulgaria	DQ	
	4	Süreyya Ayhan	Turkey	DNS	

=== Semifinals ===
Qualification: First 4 in each semifinal qualified directly (Q) for the final.

Rank	Heat	Name	Nationality	Time	Notes
1	2	Maria Mutola	Mozambique	1:59.47	Q
2	2	Letitia Vriesde	Suriname	1:59.58	Q
3	2	Mayte Martínez	Spain	2:00.07	Q
4	2	Faith Macharia	Kenya	2:00.24	Q
5	2	Zulia Calatayud	Cuba	2:01.04	
6	1	Stephanie Graf	Austria	2:01.24	Q
7	1	Kelly Holmes	Great Britain	2:01.90	Q
8	2	Luciana Mendes	Brazil	2:01.94	
9	1	Diane Cummins	Canada	2:02.07	Q
10	1	Ivonne Teichmann	Germany	2:02.16	Q
11	2	Anita Brägger	Switzerland	2:02.22	
12	2	Svetlana Badrankova	Kazakhstan	2:02.24	
13	1	Jolanda Čeplak	Slovenia	2:02.65	
14	1	Svetlana Cherkasova	Russia	2:02.85	
15	1	Tamsyn Lewis	Australia	2:03.16	
	1	Hazel Clark	United States	DNF	

=== Final ===
Rank	Name	Nationality	Time	Notes
1st place, gold medalist(s)	Maria Mutola	Mozambique	1:57.17	
2nd place, silver medalist(s)	Stephanie Graf	Austria	1:57.20	SB
3rd place, bronze medalist(s)	Letitia Vriesde	Suriname	1:57.35	SB
4	Faith Macharia	Kenya	1:58.98	
5	Diane Cummins	Canada	1:59.49	PB
6	Kelly Holmes	Great Britain	1:59.76	
7	Mayte Martínez	Spain	2:00.09	
8	Ivonne Teichmann	Germany	2:04.33	
