= 2003 IAAF World Indoor Championships – Women's 800 metres =

The women's 800 metres event at the 2003 IAAF World Indoor Championships was held on March 14–16.

== Medalists ==
Gold	Silver	Bronze
Maria Mutola; Mozambique	Stephanie Graf; Austria	Mayte Martínez; Spain

== Results ==
=== Heats ===
First 2 of each heat (Q) and next 4 fastest (q) qualified for the semifinals.

Rank	Heat	Name	Nationality	Time	Notes
1	2	Stephanie Graf	Austria	2:01.93	Q
2	1	Jolanda Čeplak	Slovenia	2:02.12	Q
3	2	Agnes Samaria	Namibia	2:02.16	Q
4	1	Mina Aït Hammou	Morocco	2:02.32	Q
	1	Yekaterina Puzanova	Russia	~~2:02.65~~	q, Doping
5	4	Maria Mutola	Mozambique	2:03.33	Q
6	2	Miho Sato	Japan	2:03.55	q
7	4	Diane Cummins	Canada	2:03.62	Q
8	4	Brigita Langerholc	Slovenia	2:03.79	q
9	1	Lwiza Msyani John	Tanzania	2:03.80	q, SB
10	1	Letitia Vriesde	Suriname	2:03.82	
11	4	Nadezhda Vorobieva	Russia	2:04.68	
12	4	Esther Desviat	Spain	2:04.96	
13	3	Mayte Martínez	Spain	2:05.16	Q
14	3	Joanne Fenn	Great Britain	2:05.45	Q
15	3	Tetiana Petlyuk	Ukraine	2:06.21	
16	2	Sandra Teixeira	Portugal	2:06.24	
17	3	Chantee Earl	United States	2:08.49	
	2	Sasha Spencer	United States	DQ	
	3	Nédia Semedo	Portugal	DNF	

=== Semifinals ===
First 3 of each semifinal (Q) qualified directly for the final.

Rank	Heat	Name	Nationality	Time	Notes
1	2	Stephanie Graf	Austria	1:59.75	Q
2	2	Mayte Martínez	Spain	1:59.82	Q, NR
3	2	Joanne Fenn	Great Britain	1:59.83	Q
4	1	Maria Mutola	Mozambique	1:59.99	Q
5	1	Jolanda Čeplak	Slovenia	2:00.14	Q
	1	Yekaterina Puzanova	Russia	~~2:00.73~~	Q, Doping
6	1	Diane Cummins	Canada	2:00.94	
7	2	Agnes Samaria	Namibia	2:01.29	
8	1	Lwiza Msyani John	Tanzania	2:03.76	SB
9	2	Mina Aït Hammou	Morocco	2:04.16	
10	2	Brigita Langerholc	Slovenia	2:04.75	
11	1	Miho Sato	Japan	2:05.66	

=== Final ===
Rank	Name	Nationality	Time	Notes
1st place, gold medalist(s)	Maria Mutola	Mozambique	1:58.94	
2nd place, silver medalist(s)	Stephanie Graf	Austria	1:59.39	SB
3rd place, bronze medalist(s)	Mayte Martínez	Spain	1:59.53	NR
4	Jolanda Čeplak	Slovenia	1:59.54	SB
5	Joanne Fenn	Great Britain	1:59.95	
	Yekaterina Puzanova	Russia	~~2:00.86~~	

Note: Yekaterina Puzanova who had originally finished sixth was later disqualified for steroid use.
