= Athletics at the 2007 All-Africa Games – Women's 1500 metres =

The women's 1500 metres at the 2007 All-Africa Games were held on July 21–22.

== Medalists ==
Gold	Silver	Bronze
Gelete Burka; Ethiopia	Veronica Nyaruai; Kenya	Agnes Samaria; Namibia

== Results ==
=== Heats ===
Qualification: First 4 of each heat (Q) and the next 4 fastest (q) qualified for the semifinals.

Rank	Heat	Name	Nationality	Time	Notes
1	1	Gelete Burka	Ethiopia	4:13.65	Q
2	1	Veronica Nyaruai	Kenya	4:13.95	Q
3	1	Nahida Thouhami	Algeria	4:14.73	Q
4	1	Fatima Lanouar	Tunisia	4:14.78	Q
5	1	René Kalmer	South Africa	4:15.29	q
6	1	Meraf Bahta	Eritrea	4:15.97	q, NR
7	1	Mapaseka Makhanya	South Africa	4:19.44	q
8	1	Amina Bakhit	Sudan	4:21.56	q
9	2	Meskerem Assefa	Ethiopia	4:23.64	Q
10	2	Agnes Samaria	Namibia	4:24.05	Q
11	2	Margaret Wangari	Kenya	4:24.14	Q
12	2	Mestawet Tadesse	Ethiopia	4:24.20	Q
13	2	Caroline Chepkwony	Kenya	4:24.35	
14	2	Safa Issaoui	Tunisia	4:24.47	
15	2	Violet Raseboya	South Africa	4:25.98	
16	2	Jeannette Nyonsaba	Burundi	4:35.34	
17	1	Clementine Nyiraguihirwa	Rwanda	4:36.31	
	1	Lilian Silva	Angola	DNS	
	1	Noelie Yarigo	Benin	DNS	
	2	Cynthia Bee	Liberia	DNS	
	2	Bulaba Sang Bender	Democratic Republic of the Congo	DNS	
	2	Hasiai Klelson	Eritrea	DNS	

=== Final ===
Rank	Name	Nationality	Time	Notes
1st place, gold medalist(s)	Gelete Burka	Ethiopia	4:06.89	
2nd place, silver medalist(s)	Veronica Nyaruai	Kenya	4:09.11	
3rd place, bronze medalist(s)	Agnes Samaria	Namibia	4:09.18	
4	Meskerem Assefa	Ethiopia	4:09.83	
5	Nahida Touhami	Algeria	4:12.34	
6	René Kalmer	South Africa	4:12.38	
7	Margaret Wangari	Kenya	4:13.70	
8	Fatima Lanouar	Tunisia	4:14.39	
9	Meraf Bahta	Eritrea	4:15.12	
10	Amina Bakhit	Sudan	4:20.22	
11	Mapaseka Makhanya	South Africa	4:22.14	
12	Mestawet Tadesse	Ethiopia	4:23.15	
