= Langerholc =

Langerholc is a Slovenian surname created from German Langerholz. Notable people with the surname include:

- Brigita Langerholc (born 1976), Slovenian middle-distance runner
- Wayne Langerholc, American lawyer and politician
