= 2008 African Championships in Athletics – Women's 800 metres =

Coordinates: 9°0′47.1″N 38°45′24.6″E

The women's 800 metres event at the 2008 African Championships in Athletics was held at the Addis Ababa Stadium on May 3–4.

== Medalists ==
Gold	Silver	Bronze
Pamela Jelimo; Kenya	Maria Mutola; Mozambique	Agnes Samaria; Namibia

== Results ==
=== Heats ===
Qualification: First 2 of each heat (Q) and the next 2 fastest (q) qualified for the final.

Rank	Heat	Name	Nationality	Time	Notes
1	2	Pamela Jelimo	Kenya	2:03.23	Q
2	3	Agnes Samaria	Namibia	2:04.62	Q
3	3	Charity Wandia	Kenya	2:05.06	Q
4	3	Fatimoh Muhammed	Liberia	2:06.35	q, NR
5	1	Maria Mutola	Mozambique	2:06.74	Q
6	2	Leonor Piuza	Mozambique	2:07.06	Q
7	1	Halima Hachlaf	Morocco	2:07.07	Q
8	1	Faith Macharia	Kenya	2:07.69	q
9	2	Mestawot Tadesse	Ethiopia	2:07.86	
10	2	Ehsan Gibril	Sudan	2:07.93	
11	1	Kalkidan Gezahegne	Ethiopia	2:10.35	
12	2	Dina Lebo Phalula	South Africa	2:12.14	
13	2	Ayisha Mitchel	Ghana	2:12.15	
14	3	Lebogang Phalula	South Africa	2:13.03	
15	1	Jeanne D'Arc Uwamahoro	Rwanda	2:14.07	
16	2	Dipa Traoré	Mali	2:14.96	
17	1	Amina Bakhit	Sudan	2:15.44	
18	3	Madina Kedir	Ethiopia	2:15.46	
19	1	Judie Milandou-Mfounda	Republic of the Congo	2:27.37	
20	2	Florence Dembert	Chad	2:41.04	
	1	Bel Cynthia	Liberia	DNS	
	3	Elizet Banda	Zambia	DNS	
	3	Irene Motunge	Botswana	DNS	
	3	Jacklin Sakilu	Tanzania	DNS	

=== Final ===
Rank	Name	Nationality	Time	Notes
1st place, gold medalist(s)	Pamela Jelimo	Kenya	1:58.70	
2nd place, silver medalist(s)	Maria Mutola	Mozambique	2:00.47	
3rd place, bronze medalist(s)	Agnes Samaria	Namibia	2:00.62	
4	Halima Hachlaf	Morocco	2:04.74	
5	Charity Wandia	Kenya	2:05.86	
6	Leonor Piuza	Mozambique	2:05.95	
7	Fatimoh Muhammed	Liberia	2:07.27	
	Faith Macharia	Kenya	DNF	
