= Vanja Perišić =

Croatian middle distance runner (born 1985)

Personal information
- Nationality: Croatia
- Born: 5 July 1985 (age 41) Split, SR Croatia, SFR Yugoslavia
- Height: 1.64 m (5 ft 4 1/2 in)
- Weight: 53 kg (117 lb)

Sport
- Sport: Athletics
- Event: 800 metres

Achievements and titles
- Personal best: 800 m: 2:00.21 (2008)

Vanja Perišić (born July 5, 1985, in Split) is a Croatian middle distance runner, who specialized in the 800 metres. Perisic represented Croatia at the 2008 Summer Olympics in Beijing, where she competed for the women's 800 metres. She ran in the third heat of the event, against six other athletes, including Kenya's Pamela Jelimo, who eventually won the gold medal in the final. She finished the race in sixth place by seventy-one hundredths of a second (0.71) behind Mauritius' Annabelle Lascar, with a time of 2:06.82. Perišić, however, failed to advance into the semi-finals, as she placed thirty-fifth overall, and was ranked farther below three mandatory slots for the next round.

On April 29, 2009, Perišić was among the Olympic non-medal winners, who tested positive for Cera, an advanced version of endurance-enhancing hormone EPO.
