= 2006 African Championships in Athletics – Women's 800 metres =

The women's 800 metres event at the 2006 African Championships in Athletics was held at the Stade Germain Comarmond on August 12–13.

== Medalists ==
Gold	Silver	Bronze
Janeth Jepkosgei; Kenya	Maria Mutola; Mozambique	Nouria Mérah-Benida; Algeria

== Results ==
=== Heats ===
Rank	Heat	Name	Nationality	Time	Notes
1	3	Janeth Jepkosgei	Kenya	2:05.11	Q
2	3	Nahida Touhami	Algeria	2:06.01	Q
3	1	Maria Mutola	Mozambique	2:06.35	Q
4	1	Agnes Samaria	Namibia	2:07.80	Q
5	1	Lebogang Phalula	South Africa	2:08.10	q
6	1	Josephine Nyarunda	Kenya	2:09.41	q
7	3	Safa Issaoui	Tunisia	2:09.56	
8	3	Sandrine Thiébaud-Kangni	Togo	2:10.07	
9	2	Nouria Mérah-Benida	Algeria	2:10.08	Q
10	2	Amina Aït Hammou	Morocco	2:10.22	Q
11	1	Eliane Saholinirina	Madagascar	2:10.39	
12	3	Grace Ebor	Nigeria	2:10.40	
13	2	Leonor Piuza	Mozambique	2:10.50	
14	2	Matata Sanogo	Mali	2:12.33	
15	3	Rabecca Nachula	Zambia	2:13.18	
16	2	Annet Mwanzi Lukhuyi	Kenya	2:13.30	
17	3	Annabelle Lascar	Mauritius	2:13.45	
18	2	Dina Lebo Phalula	South Africa	2:13.85	
19	3	Moleboheng Mafata	Lesotho	2:21.28	
	2	Berhane Herpassa	Ethiopia	DQ	
	1	Fatma Lanouar	Tunisia	DNS	
	1	Inusah Mitchell	Ghana	DNS	

=== Final ===
Rank	Name	Nationality	Time	Notes
1st place, gold medalist(s)	Janeth Jepkosgei	Kenya	2:00.64	
2nd place, silver medalist(s)	Maria Mutola	Mozambique	2:01.08	
3rd place, bronze medalist(s)	Nouria Mérah-Benida	Algeria	2:02.18	
4	Amina Aït Hammou	Morocco	2:02.41	
5	Nahida Touhami	Algeria	2:05.33	
6	Agnes Samaria	Namibia	2:07.65	
7	Josephine Nyarunda	Kenya	2:09.13	
8	Lebogang Phalula	South Africa	2:10.00	
