= 2008 African Championships in Athletics – Women's 1500 metres =

The women's 1500 metres event at the 2008 African Championships in Athletics was held at the Addis Ababa Stadium on May 2.

== Results ==
Rank	Name	Nationality	Time	Notes
1st place, gold medalist(s)	Gelete Burka	Ethiopia	4:08.25	CR
2nd place, silver medalist(s)	Meskerem Assefa	Ethiopia	4:10.40	
3rd place, bronze medalist(s)	Agnes Samaria	Namibia	4:13.91	
4	Nancy Langat	Kenya	4:16.19	
5	Irene Jelagat	Kenya	4:24.39	
6	René Kalmer	South Africa	4:29.56	
7	Emebt Etea	Ethiopia	4:30.91	
8	Saïda El Mehdi	Morocco	4:39.29	
9	Elizet Banda	Zambia	4:40.57	
10	Ayisha Mitchel	Ghana	4:41.10	
11	Marie Chantal Nininahazwe	Burundi	5:07.07	
12	Francine Nzilampa	Democratic Republic of the Congo	5:11.76	
