= Diane Cummins =

Canadian middle-distance runner

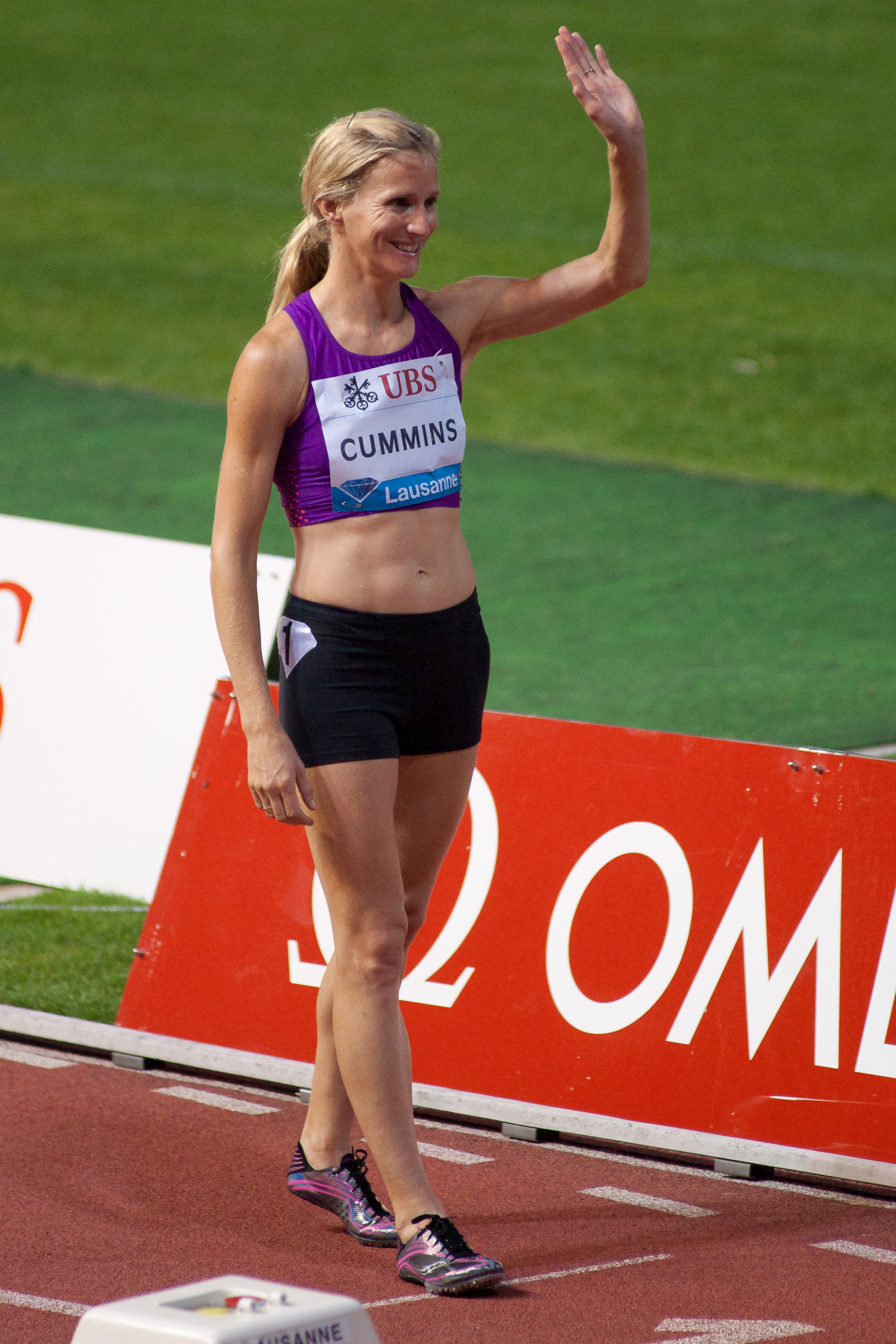
- Cummins in 2012

Personal information
- Born: 19 January 1974 (age 52) Pinetown, KwaZulu-Natal, South Africa
- Home town: Victoria, British Columbia, Canada

Sport
- Sport: Track and field
Medal record
Representing Canada
Commonwealth Games
Silver medal – second place	2002 Manchester	800m
Bronze medal – third place	1998 Kuala Lumpur	4x400m relay
Bronze medal – third place	2010 Delhi	800m
Pan American Games
Gold medal – first place	2007 Rio de Janeiro	800m

Diane S. Cummins (born 19 January 1974) is a South African-born Canadian middle distance runner. She set her personal best (1:58.39) in the women's 800 metres on 2 September 2001 at a meet in Rieti (Italy).

== Achievements ==
Year	Competition	Venue	Position	Event	Notes
Representing Canada
1998	Commonwealth Games	Kuala Lumpur, Malaysia	14th (sf)	800 m	2:04.40
1998	Commonwealth Games	Kuala Lumpur, Malaysia	3rd	4 × 400 m	3:29.97
1999	Pan American Games	Winnipeg, Canada	5th	800 m	2:03.10
2001	Jeux de la Francophonie	Ottawa, Canada	1st	800 m	2:00.77
2001	World Championships	Edmonton, Canada	5th	800 m	1:59.49
2002	Commonwealth Games	Manchester, United Kingdom	2nd	800 m	1:58.82
2002	Commonwealth Games	Manchester, United Kingdom	9th	1500 m	4:14.83
2003	World Indoor Championships	Birmingham, United Kingdom	6th (sf)	800 m	2:00.94
2003	World Championships	Paris, France	6th	800 m	2:02.48
2004	Olympic Games	Athens, Greece	14th (sf)	800 m	2:00.30
2005	World Championships	Helsinki, Finland	8th (sf)	800 m	2:00.10
2006	Commonwealth Games	Melbourne, Australia	5th	800 m	1:59.31
2007	Pan American Games	Rio de Janeiro, Brazil	1st	800 m	1:59.75
2007	Pan American Games	Rio de Janeiro, Brazil	6th	4 × 400 m	3:32.37
2007	World Championships	Osaka, Japan	18th (sf)	800 m	2:00.51
2010	Commonwealth Games	New Delhi, India	3rd	800 m	2:00.13

== See also ==
- Canadian records in track and field
