= Nédia Semedo =

Portuguese middle-distance runner

Nédia Semedo (born 14 November 1978 in Faro, in the Algarve region) is a retired Portuguese athlete who competed in the middle-distance events. She represented her country at the 2004 Summer Olympics narrowly missing the semifinals. Her biggest successes are the silver medal at the 2001 Summer Universiade and the sixth place at the 2002 European Championships.

== Competition record ==
Year	Competition	Venue	Position	Event	Notes
Representing Portugal
1998	Ibero-American Championships	Lisbon, Portugal	4th	800 m	2:05.98
1999	European U23 Championships	Gothenburg, Sweden	5th	800 m	2:04.81
2001	Universiade	Beijing, China	2nd	800 m	2:01.64
2002	European Indoor Championships	Vienna, Austria	12th (h)	1500 m	4:18.93
2002	European Championships	Munich, Germany	6th	800 m	2:00.54
2003	World Indoor Championships	Birmingham, United Kingdom	–	800 m	DNF
2004	Ibero-American Championships	Huelva, Spain	4th	800 m	2:02.61
2004	Olympic Games	Athens, Greece	19th (h)	800 m	2:02.61
2005	European Indoor Championships	Madrid, Spain	4th (sf)	800 m	2:04.35

== Personal bests ==
Outdoor

- 400 metres – 54.87 (Seia 2003)
- 800 metres – 2:00.49 (Lisbon 2004)
- 1000 metres – 2:40.11 (Lisbon 2004)
- 1500 metres – 4:09.46 (Funchal 2001)
- One mile – 4:36.78 (Lisbon 1999)

Indoor

- 400 metres – 54.78 (Espinho 2005)
- 800 metres – 2:01.11 (Espinho 2003)
- 1000 metres – 2:41.55 (Madrid 2005)
- 1500 metres – 4:13.58 (Espinho 2003)
