= Zulia Calatayud =

Cuban runner (born 1979)

Personal information
- Full name: Zulia Inés Calatayud Torres
- Born: November 9, 1979 (age 46) Playa, Havana
- Height: 1.69 m (5 ft 7 in)
- Weight: 59 kg (130 lb)

Sport
- Country: Cuba
- Sport: Athletics
Medal record
Representing Cuba
World Championships
Gold medal – first place	2005 Helsinki	800m
Pan American Games
Gold medal – first place	1999 Winnipeg	4x400m relay
Gold medal – first place	2007 Rio de Janeiro	4x400m relay
Silver medal – second place	1999 Winnipeg	800m
Bronze medal – third place	2007 Rio de Janeiro	800m
Central American and Caribbean Games
Gold medal – first place	2006 Cartagena	800m
Bronze medal – third place	2006 Cartagena	4x400m relay
- Updated on 24 June 2013

Zulia Inés Calatayud Torres (born November 9, 1979, in Havana) is a Cuban runner competing mostly in the 800 metres event.

== Early career ==
Calatayud, who attended Havana's Manuel Permuy Sports School, got involved in athletics to help her deal with her asthma. She first gained prominence by reaching the semi-finals of the 400 m at the 1998 World Junior Championships in Annecy, France. In 1999, she ran 2:00.67 to finish second at the Pan American Games in Winnipeg, Canada. She finished sixth in the 800 m at the Olympic Games in Sydney, Australia. 2000 was also notable to Calatayud because she went under the 2-minute barrier, first doing so when she ran 1:59.63 in Jena, Germany.

In 2002, Calatayud became the 30th-fastest woman ever in her event, running 1:56.09 at the Herculis Golden League meeting, in Monaco. It was to be her last competition for 19 months, as dual shin injuries kept the 22-year-old from even being able to train. She made a successful return to competition, not only qualifying for the Olympic Games in Athens, Greece, but making her second consecutive Olympics final, finishing eighth.

== World domination ==
A consistent 2005 season prefaces Calatayud's participation in the IAAF World Championships, in Helsinki. She ran a season's best 1:57.92 in her semi-final, her second fastest ever, and In the final matched every move made by Mutola and world leader, Tatyana Andrianova. In 1:58.82, Zulia Calatayud had become a World Champion. She ended the 2005 season with a convincing victory at the World Athletics Final in Monaco. The winning streak landed her atop the IAAF World Rankings, replacing Mutola who had led since the rankings were introduced in 2001.

For the 2006 season, Calatayud picked up where she left off a few months prior. She clocked her second fastest time ever (1:56.91) when placing third at the Athletissima meeting, in Lausanne, in July. She claimed the 800 m crown at the 20th Central American and Caribbean Games, in Cartagena, Colombia, but after 51 consecutive weeks, she lost the No.1 spot in the rankings to Kenya's African and Commonwealth champion Janeth Jepkosgei. Nonetheless, Calatayud ended 2006 on a high note, winning the World Athletics Final and World Cup on consecutive weekends, beating rival Jepkosgei on both occasions. She was selected as Cuban and Latin American sportswoman of the year in an annual survey conducted by Prensa Latina. A total of 115 media outlets from Latin America, the Caribbean, Asia, Africa, Europe and the United States participated in the survey.

== Injury again ==
In 2007, Calatayud was injured again, this time her season did not get underway until June, but after six weeks of training, she took a bronze medal at the Pan American Games in Rio de Janeiro. She also ran the third leg as the Cuban team won the 4 × 400 m relay gold with Daimí Pernía, Aymée Martínez and Indira Terrero. Since 2006, Calatayud has not made a major world final, falling in the semifinals at the World World Championships in Osaka 2007 and Berlin 2009, as well as the Olympic Games in Beijing in 2008. In 2009, Calatayud won the 800 at the 22nd Central American and Caribbean Athletics Championships in Havana, Cuba, in the Estadio Panamericano.

== Personal bests ==
- 200 Metres – 24.33 01/01/1998
- 400 metres 50.87 (Alcalá de Henares 30/06/2001)
- 800 metres – 1:56.09 (Monaco 19/07/2002)
- 1000 metres – 2:34.31 (Bruxelles 30/08/2002)
- 1500 metres – 4:21.73 (La Habana 23/03/2006)

== Achievements ==
Year	Competition	Venue	Position	Event	Notes
Representing Cuba
1998	World Junior Championships	Annecy, France	10th (sf)	400 m	53.65 s
1999	Pan American Games	Winnipeg, Canada	2nd	800 m	2:00.67 min
1999	Pan American Games	Winnipeg, Canada	1st	4 × 400 m relay	3:26.70 min
1999	World Championships	Sevilla, Spain	19th (h)	800 m	2:00.93 min
1999	World Championships	Sevilla, Spain	7th	4 × 400 m relay	3:29.19 min
2000	Olympic Games	Sydney, Australia	6th	800 m	1:58.66 min
2000	Olympic Games	Sydney, Australia	8th	4 × 400 m relay	3:29.47 min
2001	World Championships	Edmonton, Canada	5th (sf)	800 m	2:01.04 min
2001	Goodwill Games	Brisbane, Australia	4th	800 m	2:00.94 min
2001	Grand Prix Final	Melbourne, Australia	4th	800 m	2:00.89 min
2002	IAAF World Cup	Madrid, Spain	4th	800 m	1:59.44 min
2004	Ibero-American Championships	Huelva, Spain	1st	800 m	2:01.30 min
2004	Olympic Games	Athens, Greece	8th	800 m	2:00.95 min
2005	World Championships	Helsinki, Finland	1st	800 m	1:58.82 min
2005	World Athletics Final	Monaco	1st	800 m	1:59.07 min
2006	Central American and Caribbean Games	Cartagena, Colombia	1st	800 m	2:05.26 min
2006	Central American and Caribbean Games	Cartagena, Colombia	3rd	4 × 400 m relay	3:36.34 min
2006	World Athletics Final	Stuttgart, Germany	1st	800 m	1:59.02
2006	IAAF World Cup	Athens, Greece	1st	800 m	2:00.06 min
2007	Pan American Games	Rio de Janeiro, Brazil	3rd	800 m	2:00.34 min
2007	Pan American Games	Rio de Janeiro, Brazil	1st	4 × 400 m relay	3:27.51 min
2007	World Championships	Osaka, Japan	24th (sf)	800 m	2:06.97 min
2007	World Championships	Osaka, Japan	7th	4 × 400 m relay	3:27.05 min
2008	Olympic Games	Beijing, China	10th (sf)	800 m	1:58.78
2008	Olympic Games	Beijing, China	6th	4 × 400 m relay	3:23.21 min NR
2009	ALBA Games	Havana, Cuba	1st	800 m	2:05.58 min
2009	ALBA Games	Havana, Cuba	1st	4 × 400 m relay	3:35.04 min
2009	Central American and Caribbean Championships	Havana, Cuba	1st	800 m	2:01.63 min
2009	World Championships	Berlin, Germany	16th (sf)	800 m	2:01.53 min
2009	World Championships	Berlin, Germany	8th	4 × 400 m relay	3:36.99 min

== 800 m progression ==
2009	2:00.20	Huelva	10/06/2009
2008	1:58.78	Beijing (National Stadium)	16/08/2008
2007	2:00.34	Rio de Janeiro	24/07/2007
2006	1:56.91	Lausanne	11/07/2006
2005	1:57.92	Helsinki	07/08/2005
2004	1:59.21	Athens (Olympic Stadium)	21/08/2004
2002	1:56.09	Monaco	19/07/2002
2001	1:58.60	Monaco	20/07/2001
2000	1:58.66	Sydney	25/09/2000
1999	2:00.67	Winnipeg	25/07/1999
1997	2:12.7		01/01/1997
1996	2:13.80		01/01/1996
1995	2:18.9		01/01/1995
