= Marcela Britos =

Uruguayan track and field athlete (born 1985)

Personal information
- Full name: Marcela Valeria Britos
- Nationality: Uruguay
- Born: 26 February 1985 (age 41) Maldonado, Uruguay
- Height: 1.67 m (5 ft 5 1/2 in)
- Weight: 57 kg (126 lb)

Sport
- Sport: Athletics
- Event: 800 metres

Achievements and titles
- Personal best: 800 m: 2:06.22

Marcela Valeria Britos (born February 26, 1985, in Maldonado) is a Uruguayan track and field athlete, who specialized in middle distance running. She represented Uruguay at the 2008 Summer Olympics in Beijing, and competed in the women's 800 metres. She ran in the third heat of the event, against six other athletes, including Kenya's Pamela Jelimo, who eventually became an Olympic champion in the final. Britos finished the race in last place, with a time of 2:08.98, but was upgraded to sixth position in this heat, when Croatia's Vanja Perišić had been disqualified for failing the doping test.
