= Athletics at the 2008 Summer Olympics – Women's 800 metres =

Women's 800 metres at the Games of the XXIX Olympiad
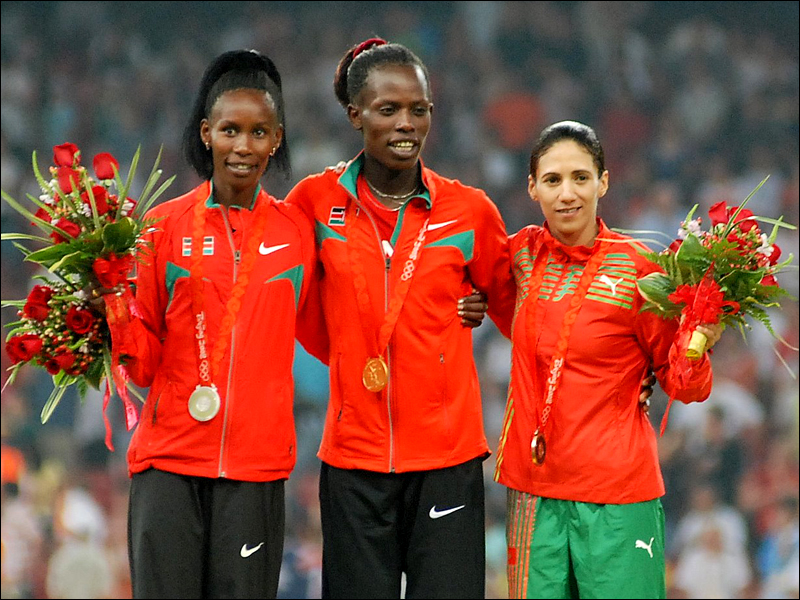
- Medal ceremony
- Venue: Beijing National Stadium
- Dates: 15 August 2008 (heats); 16 August 2008 (semi-finals); 18 August 2008 (final)
- Competitors: 40 from 33 nations
- Winning time: 1:54.87

Medalists
1st place, gold medalist(s)		Pamela Jelimo	Kenya
2nd place, silver medalist(s)		Janeth Jepkosgei Busienei	Kenya
3rd place, bronze medalist(s)		Hasna Benhassi	Morocco

Video on YouTube Official Video

The women's 800 metres at the 2008 Summer Olympics took place on 15–18 August at the Beijing National Stadium.

The qualifying standards were 2:00.00 (A standard) and 2:01.30 (B standard).

Vanja Perišić of Croatia was later disqualified for failing an in-competition drugs test.

This would be the last Olympic appearance by Maria Mutola, a string which started with her as a 15 year old in the 1988 Olympics, a perennial finalist since 1992. In the final, both Kenyan athletes went to the front, with World Champion Janeth Jepkosgei taking the front and teenager Pamela Jelimo following. Coming out of the break, Kenia Sinclair in lane 3 squeezed quickly into lane 1, shutting the door on Mutola. Just before the bell, Jelimo passed Jepkosgei and set off on her own. Jepkosgei gave chase but the gap just continued to widen all the way to the finish. Jelimo and Jepkosgei never saw a challenge to their gold and silver, behind them Sinclair, then Mutola gave an ever futile chase. From almost the back of the pack, Hasna Benhassi moved forward through the turn. Coming off the turn, Mutola was making her move on Sinclair and Benhassi was making her move on Mutola, the three athletes lined up shoulder to shoulder. Benhassi had the speed while the other two struggled. After being passed by Benhassi, Tatiana Andrianova followed her around the slowing athletes. While Andrianova was faster down the straightaway, she couldn't make up enough ground, Benhassi finishing with bronze after taking silver in the previous three major championships.

== Records ==
Prior to this competition, the existing world record, Olympic record, and world leading time were as follows:

World record	Jarmila Kratochvílová (TCH)	1:53.28	Munich, West Germany	26 July 1983
Olympic record	Nadezhda Olizarenko (URS)	1:53.43	Moscow, Soviet Union	27 July 1980
World Leading	Pamela Jelimo (KEN)	1:54.97	Paris, France	18 July 2008

No new world or Olympic records were set for this event.

== Results ==
=== Round 1 ===
Qualification: First 3 in each heat(Q) and the next 6 fastest(q) advance to the semifinals.

Rank	Heat	Athlete	Nation	Time	Notes
1	4	Maria Mutola	Mozambique	1:58.91	Q, SB
2	4	Marilyn Okoro	Great Britain	1:59.01	Q
3	4	Lucia Klocova	Slovakia	1:59.42	Q
4	4	Tamsyn Lewis	Australia	1:59.67	q
5	6	Janeth Jepkosgei Busienei	Kenya	1:59.72	Q
6	6	Tetyana Petlyuk	Ukraine	2:00.00	Q
7	4	Neisha Bernard-Thomas	Grenada	2:00.09	q, NR
8	6	Brigita Langerholc	Slovenia	2:00.13	Q
9	6	Eglė Balčiūnaitė	Lithuania	2:00.15	q, PB
10	2	Yuliya Krevsun	Ukraine	2:00.21	Q
11	6	Elisa Cusma Piccione	Italy	2:00.24	q
12	2	Tatiana Andrianova	Russia	2:00.31	Q
13	2	Jennifer Meadows	Great Britain	2:00.33	Q
14	5	Zulia Calatayud	Cuba	2:00.34	Q
DSQ	2	Sviatlana Usovich	Belarus	2:00.42	q, SB
16	5	Hasna Benhassi	Morocco	2:00.51	Q
17	5	Ekaterina Kostetskaya	Russia	2:00.54	Q
18	5	Olga Cristea	Moldova	2:00.59	q, PB
19	5	Hazel Clark-Riley	United States	2:01.59	
20	1	Svetlana Klyuka	Russia	2:01.67	Q
21	6	Carmo Tavares	Portugal	2:01.91	
22	1	Rosibel García	Colombia	2:01.98	Q
23	2	Marian Burnett	Guyana	2:02.02	
24	1	Anna Rostkowska	Poland	2:02.11	Q
25	1	Jemma Simpson	Great Britain	2:02.16	
26	1	Agnes Samaria	Namibia	2:02.18	
27	2	Alice Schmidt	United States	2:02.33	
28	5	Mihaela Neacșu	Romania	2:03.03	
29	1	Madeleine Pape	Australia	2:03.09	
30	3	Pamela Jelimo	Kenya	2:03.18	Q
31	3	Kenia Sinclair	Jamaica	2:03.76	Q
32	3	Elodie Guegan	France	2:03.85	Q
33	3	Merve Aydın	Turkey	2:04.75	
34	3	Annabelle Lascar	Mauritius	2:06.11	PB
35	3	Marcela Britos	Uruguay	2:08.98	
36	1	Baraah Awadallah	Jordan	2:18.41	SB
37	2	Haley Nicole Nemra	Marshall Islands	2:18.83	
38	4	Emilia Mikue Ondo	Equatorial Guinea	2:20.69	
39	5	Aishath Reesha	Maldives	2:30.14	PB
	4	Nicole Teter	United States	DNF	
	6	Mireille Derebona-Ngaisset	Central African Republic	DQ	
	3	Vanja Perišić	Croatia	~~2:06.82~~	DSQ

WR world record | AR area record | CR championship record | GR games record | NR national record | OR Olympic record | PB personal best | SB season best | WL world leading (in a given season)

=== Semifinals ===
Rank	Heat	Athlete	Nation	Time	Notes
1	3	Janeth Jepkosgei Busienei	Kenya	1:57.28	Q, SB
2	2	Pamela Jelimo	Kenya	1:57.31	Q
3	3	Yuliya Krevsun	Ukraine	1:57.32	Q, PB
4	2	Hasna Benhassi	Morocco	1:58.03	Q, SB
5	3	Tatiana Andrianova	Russia	1:58.16	q
6	3	Kenia Sinclair	Jamaica	1:58.28	q, SB
7	1	Svetlana Klyuka	Russia	1:58.31	Q
8	2	Ekaterina Kostetskaya	Russia	1:58.33	
9	1	Maria Mutola	Mozambique	1:58.61	Q, SB
10	2	Zulia Calatayud	Cuba	1:58.78	SB
11	1	Lucia Klocová	Slovakia	1:58.80	
12	2	Anna Rostkowska	Poland	1:58.84	
13	1	Tetyana Petlyuk	Ukraine	1:59.27	
14	1	Rosibel García	Colombia	1:59.38	NR
15	2	Jennifer Meadows	Great Britain	1:59.43	
16	3	Elisa Cusma Piccione	Italy	1:59.52	
17	1	Marilyn Okoro	Great Britain	1:59.53	
18	1	Brigita Langerholc	Slovenia	2:00.00	
19	3	Olga Cristea	Moldova	2:00.12	PB
20	1	Tamsyn Lewis	Australia	2:01.41	
21	3	Neisha Bernard-Thomas	Grenada	2:01.84	
22	2	Eglė Balčiūnaitė	Lithuania	2:02.59	
	2	Sviatlana Usovich	Belarus	DSQ	
	3	Elodie Guegan	France	DNF	

=== Final ===
Rank	Lane	Athlete	Time	Notes	
1st place, gold medalist(s)	4	Pamela Jelimo	Kenya	1:54.87	WJR, AR
2nd place, silver medalist(s)	7	Janeth Jepkosgei	Kenya	1:56.07	
3rd place, bronze medalist(s)	8	Hasna Benhassi	Morocco	1:56.73	SB
4	6	Svetlana Klyuka	Russia	1:56.94	PB
5	2	Maria de Lurdes Mutola	Mozambique	1:57.68	SB
6	3	Kenia Sinclair	Jamaica	1:58.24	SB
7	9	Yuliya Krevsun	Ukraine	1:58.73	
8	5	Tatyana Andrianova	Russia	2:02.63	

=== Splits ===
Intermediate	Athlete	Country	Mark
400m	Pamela Jelimo	Kenya	55.41
600m	Pamela Jelimo	Kenya	1:24.03
