= Marie-Lyne Joseph =

Dominican middle-distance runner (born 1982)

Personal information
- Nationality: Dominican
- Born: Marie-Lyne Joseph; 3 September 1982 Guadeloupe

Sport
- Sport: Middle-distance running
- Event: 800 metres

Marie-Lyne Joseph (born 3 September 1982) is a Dominican middle-distance runner. Born in Guadeloupe, she represents Dominica internationally. She competed at the 2004 Summer Olympics in the women's 800 metres where she finished seventh in her heat, failing to advance.

== Biography ==
Marie-Lyne Joseph was born on 3 September 1982 in Guadeloupe. Although Joseph was born in Guadeloupe, she represented Dominica in international competition.

During her international sporting career, she was selected to be part of the Dominican delegation at the 2002 Central American and Caribbean Games held in San Salvador, El Salvador. She was entered in the finals of the women's 800 metres against six other runners but ultimately did not start in the event. She made her World Championships debut the following year at the 2003 World Championships in Athletics held in Saint-Denis, France. There, she competed in the heats of the women's 800 metres in the first heat on 24 August. Against seven other athletes, she placed last with a time of 2:17.73 and did not advance further into the competition. This mark set a new personal best for her.

For the 2004 Summer Olympics held in Athens, Greece, Joseph was selected to be part of the Dominican team. She competed in the preliminary heats of the women's 800 metres on 20 August. She competed against six other athletes. There, she recorded a time of 2:20.23 and placed last in her heat, failing to advance to the semifinals. As per Joseph's World Athletics profile, this would be her last appearance for the nation in international competition.
