= Athletics at the 2002 Commonwealth Games – Women's 800 metres =

Women's 800 metres at the Commonwealth Games

The women's 800 metres event at the 2002 Commonwealth Games was held on 27–29 July.

== Medalists ==
Gold	Silver	Bronze
Maria Mutola; Mozambique	Diane Cummins; Canada	Agnes Samaria; Namibia

== Results ==
=== Heats ===
Qualification: First 2 of each heat (Q) and the next 6 fastest (q) qualified for the semifinals.

Rank	Heat	Name	Nationality	Time	Notes
1	2	Maria Mutola	Mozambique	2:01.87	Q
2	2	Susan Scott	Scotland	2:02.82	Q
3	5	Agnes Samaria	Namibia	2:03.04	Q
4	3	Grace Ebor	Nigeria	2:03.12	Q, SB
5	2	Marian Burnett	Guyana	2:03.31	q
6	5	Charlotte Moore	England	2:03.38	Q
7	3	Tamsyn Lewis	Australia	2:03.40	Q
8	5	Michelle Ballentine	Jamaica	2:03.66	q, SB
9	1	Faith Macharia	Kenya	2:03.88	Q
10	2	Emma Davies	Wales	2:04.02	q, SB
11	4	Diane Cummins	Canada	2:04.09	Q
12	4	Joanne Fenn	England	2:04.17	Q
13	4	Charmaine Howell	Jamaica	2:04.45	q
14	4	Anny Christofidou	Cyprus	2:04.48	q, NR
15	1	Melissa de Leon	Trinidad and Tobago	2:04.65	Q
16	4	Anna Ndege	Tanzania	2:05.13	q
17	3	Rebecca Lyne	England	2:05.26	
18	3	Grace Birungi	Uganda	2:05.80	
19	1	Oluoma Nwoke	Nigeria	2:05.93	
20	3	Sheena Gooding	Barbados	2:06.47	
21	2	Tamika Williams	Bermuda	2:06.57	
22	4	Kelly McNeice	Northern Ireland	2:06.68	
23	5	Marian Omajuwa	Nigeria	2:07.24	
24	5	Janill Williams	Antigua and Barbuda	2:11.58	
25	2	Lwiza John	Tanzania	2:14.38	
26	1	Bongiwe Mndzebele	Swaziland	2:17.82	
27	1	Sisilia Dauniwe	Fiji	2:18.59	
	5	Kadie Koroma	Sierra Leone	DQ	
	1	Mardrea Hyman	Jamaica	DNS	
	3	Addeh Mwamba	Zambia	DNS	

=== Semifinals ===
Qualification: First 3 of each heat (Q) and the next 2 fastest (q) qualified for the final.

Rank	Heat	Name	Nationality	Time	Notes
1	1	Tamsyn Lewis	Australia	2:00.55	Q
2	1	Diane Cummins	Canada	2:00.85	Q
3	1	Charlotte Moore	England	2:00.95	Q, PB
4	1	Susan Scott	Scotland	2:01.03	q, PB
5	2	Maria Mutola	Mozambique	2:01.59	Q
6	1	Michelle Ballentine	Jamaica	2:02.043	q, PB
7	2	Agnes Samaria	Namibia	2:02.50	Q
8	2	Joanne Fenn	England	2:03.04	Q
9	1	Faith Macharia	Kenya	2:03.48	
10	2	Marian Burnett	Guyana	2:03.52	
11	2	Grace Ebor	Nigeria	2:03.65	
12	2	Emma Davies	Wales	2:03.93	SB
13	2	Charmaine Howell	Jamaica	2:04.15	
14	1	Melissa de Leon	Trinidad and Tobago	2:04.45	
15	2	Anny Christofidou	Cyprus	2:05.05	
16	1	Anna Ndege	Tanzania	2:05.87	

=== Final ===
Rank	Name	Nationality	Time	Notes
1st place, gold medalist(s)	Maria Mutola	Mozambique	1:57.35	GR
2nd place, silver medalist(s)	Diane Cummins	Canada	1:58.82	SB
3rd place, bronze medalist(s)	Agnes Samaria	Namibia	1:59.15	NR
4	Susan Scott	Scotland	1:59.30	NR
5	Tamsyn Lewis	Australia	1:59.73	SB
6	Charlotte Moore	England	1:59.75	PB
7	Joanne Fenn	England	1:59.86	PB
8	Michelle Ballentine	Jamaica	2:03.75	
