= Anita Brägger =

Swiss middle-distance runner

Anita Brägger (born 6 October 1972 in Altdorf) is a retired Swiss middle-distance runner who competed mostly in the 800 metres. She represented her country at the 2004 Summer Olympics failing to qualify for the semifinals. In addition, she competed at three World Championships, in 1999, 2001 and 2003, reaching semifinals twice.

Her ex-husband is another Olympic athlete, Christian Belz.

== Competition record ==
Year	Competition	Venue	Position	Event	Notes
Representing Switzerland
1991	European Junior Championships	Thessaloniki, Greece	11th (h)	800 m	2:19.45
1998	European Championships	Budapest, Hungary	21st (h)	800 m	2:02.50
1999	World Championships	Seville, Spain	24th (h)	800 m	2:01.89
2001	World Championships	Edmonton, Canada	11th (sf)	800 m	2:02.22
2003	World Championships	Paris, France	21st (sf)	800 m	2:02.34
2004	Olympic Games	Athens, Greece	31st (h)	800 m	2:04.00

== Personal bests ==
Outdoor

- 400 metres – 53.26 (Genève 2001)
- 600 metres – 1:27.63 (Langenthal 1999)
- 800 metres – 1:59.66 (Lausanne 2001)
- 1000 metres – 2:40.00 (Rovereto 2002)
- 1500 metres – 4:19.52 (Bern 2001)

Indoor

- 800 metres – 2:04.15 (Karlsruhe 2000)
- 1000 metres – 2:45.90 (Liévin 2005)
