= Maria Mutola =

Mozambican middle-distance runner

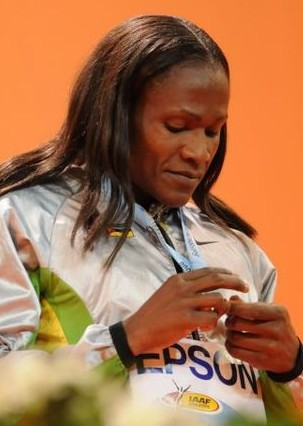
- Mutola in 2008 at the World Indoor Championships in Valencia

Personal information
- Nicknames: Maputo Express, Lurdinha
- Nationality: Mozambican
- Born: 27 October 1972 (age 53) Lourenço Marques, Mozambique
- Height: 1.65 m (5 ft 5 in)
- Weight: 63 kg (139 lb)

Sport
- Sport: Track and field
- Events: 800 metres, 1500 metres

Achievements and titles
- Personal bests: 400 m: 51.37 (1994); 800 m: 1:55.19 (1994); 1500 m: 4:01.50 (2002)
Medal record
Women's athletics
Representing Mozambique
Event	1st	2nd	3rd
Olympic Games	1	0	1
World Championships	3	1	1
World Indoor Championships	7	1	1
African Championships	5	3	0
Commonwealth Games	2	0	1
All-Africa Games	3	0	0
Total	21	5	4
Event	1st	2nd	3rd
800 metres	20	5	4
1500 metres	1	0	0
Olympic Games
Gold medal – first place	2000 Sydney	800 m
Bronze medal – third place	1996 Atlanta	800 m
World Championships
Gold medal – first place	1993 Stuttgart	800 m
Gold medal – first place	2001 Edmonton	800 m
Gold medal – first place	2003 Paris	800 m
Silver medal – second place	1999 Seville	800 m
Bronze medal – third place	1997 Athens	800 m
World Indoor Championships
Gold medal – first place	1993 Toronto	800 m
Gold medal – first place	1995 Barcelona	800 m
Gold medal – first place	1997 Paris	800 m
Gold medal – first place	2001 Lisbon	800 m
Gold medal – first place	2003 Birmingham	800 m
Gold medal – first place	2004 Budapest	800 m
Gold medal – first place	2006 Moscow	800 m
Silver medal – second place	1999 Maebashi	800 m
Bronze medal – third place	2008 Valencia	800 m
Commonwealth Games
Gold medal – first place	1998 Kuala Lumpur	800 m
Gold medal – first place	2002 Manchester	800 m
Bronze medal – third place	2006 Melbourne	800 m
All-Africa Games
Gold medal – first place	1991 Cairo	800 m
Gold medal – first place	1995 Harare	800 m
Gold medal – first place	1999 Johannesburg	800 m
African Championships
Gold medal – first place	1990 Cairo	800 m
Gold medal – first place	1990 Cairo	1500 m
Gold medal – first place	1993 Durban	800 m
Gold medal – first place	1998 Dakar	800 m
Gold medal – first place	2002 Tunis	800 m
Silver medal – second place	1988 Annaba	800 m
Silver medal – second place	2006 Bambous	800 m
Silver medal – second place	2008 Addis Ababa	800 m
Representing Africa
World Cup
Gold medal – first place	1992 Havana	800 m
Gold medal – first place	1994 London	800 m
Gold medal – first place	1998 Johannesburg	800 m
Gold medal – first place	2002 Madrid	800 m

Maria de Lurdes Mutola (/məˈriːə muːˈtoʊlə/ mə-REE-ə moo-TOH-lə; born 27 October 1972) is a retired Mozambican female track and field athlete who specialised in the 800 metres running event. She is only the fourth female track and field athlete to compete at six Olympic Games. She is a three-time world champion in this event and a one-time Olympic champion.

Although Mutola never broke the world record in her favourite event, she is regarded by many track insiders and fans as one of the greatest 800 metres female runners of all time. Due to her consistent performance in major championships and her exceptional longevity, she competed at the highest level for two decades before retiring from athletics in 2008 at the age of 35. She is also the only athlete ever to have won Olympic, World, World indoor, Commonwealth Games, Continental Games and Continental Championships titles in the same event. She is also the main coach and mentor of Caster Semenya.

== Career ==
=== Early years ===
Mutola was born in 1972 in the poor shanty town of Chamanculo on the outskirts of Maputo, then known as Lourenço Marques, the capital of Portuguese Mozambique. Her father was employed by the railways and her mother was a market vendor. As a young girl she excelled in football. She played with boys, as there were no leagues or teams for girls. At only 14 years of age, she was encouraged to take up athletics by one of Mozambique's foremost literary figures, the poet José Craveirinha, who was a keen sports fan. His son Stelio, himself a former national long jump record holder who had competed in the 1980 Summer Olympics, was Mutola's first coach.

After a visit to Portugal, plans were made for her to join the Lisbon-based Benfica athletics club, but at the last minute the Mozambican government denied her permission. The next year, after several months' training, she won a silver medal in the 800 metres in the 1988 African Championships in Annaba, Algeria before competing in the 1988 Summer Olympics less than a month later. She ran a personal best time of 2:04.36, but only finished seventh in her first round heat, failing to progress to the semi-finals. Mutola was still only fifteen years old.

=== Studying and training in the United States ===
Over the next few years Mutola failed to improve on her best time, but still won gold at the African Championships in Cairo in 1990. She faced little opposition in Mozambique and only trained properly in the run-up to big competitions. Attempts were made to organise scholarships for her to train abroad, but it was not until 1991 that, thanks to an IOC solidarity programme, she was awarded a scholarship to go to the United States to study and train. Springfield High School in Oregon was her host school, due to the fact that there was a Portuguese-speaking staff member (since Mutola spoke no English).

She quickly surprised many by finishing fourth in the final of the 1991 World Championships in Tokyo, where her time of 1:57.63 constituted a world junior record. Mutola lost out on a medal because she was severely impeded, elbowed twice by Ella Kovacs as she tried to pass in the final few metres. On the finish line, Kovacs fell across the line ahead of Mutola, reaching out and tripping race winner Lilia Nurutdinova as well. A protest was lodged but it was unsuccessful. At the 1992 Summer Olympics in Barcelona there were great hopes for Mutola to win Mozambique's first Olympic medal. She ran strongly but faded badly in the home straight, eventually finishing fifth behind winner Ellen van Langen. At the same Olympics, Mutola ran one of the few 1500 m races at an international championship, placing ninth in the final. That same year she also won the 800 m event at the 1992 IAAF World Cup in Havana, and was the only woman to beat Ellen van Langen throughout the whole year.

=== Status in 800 m race history ===
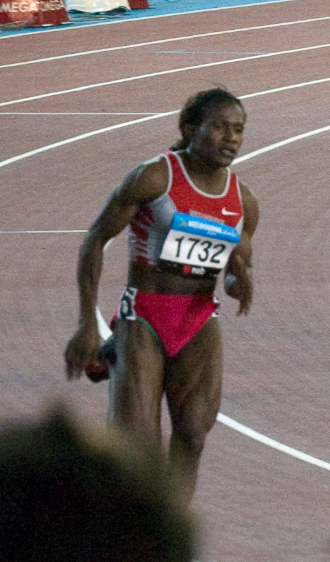
Maria Mutola 2006 Commonwealth Games on the way to winning the 800 metres semi-final

Mutola is often ranked as one of the greatest female 800 m runners of all time, and to some even the best. She has not gained a world record in the event, but her consistency, her performances at major championships and her ability to compete at the highest levels of the sport for two decades are unmatched – the 2008 Olympics were her sixth consecutive Olympics. She does however have a 0–4 record against her rival Ana Quirot in World and Olympic competition, and Quirot ran sub-1:55 twice vs. Mutola's career best of 1:55.16. In terms of global championship gold medals however, Mutola bests Quirot in Olympic titles (1–0), outdoor World titles (3–2) and indoor World titles (7–0). Mutola and Quirot are good friends to this day and often write one another, and Mutola often wrote Quirot letters of encouragement to return to Track and Field following her near fatal heavy burn explosion.

Mutola won bronze in the 1997 IAAF World Championships in Athletics and silver in 1999. She also won the IAAF World Indoor Championships in Athletics in 1997, only weeks after her father had been killed in a car accident. She raced wearing a black ribbon and dedicated the victory to his memory. In total she has won nine world 800 m titles, including both indoor and outdoor championships. She won the Commonwealth Games twice, after Mozambique was admitted to the Commonwealth in 1995, and has also won the IAAF World Cup event, representing the Africa team, four times consecutively.

Her greatest moment, though, came at the Sydney Olympics in 2000, when Mutola finally won Olympic gold. She beat her major rival Stephanie Graf and Kelly Holmes. She returned to Mozambique after her Olympic victory, huge crowds came to cheer her and a road was named after her in Maputo.

She continued her successes in the 2001 season, grabbing the world title in Edmonton and again in 2003 in Paris. It was widely felt that Mutola ran tactically during the 2003 race by setting a slow pace in order to aid her training partner Kelly Holmes. As a result of such a strategy Holmes was able to take silver. Mutola was unbeaten throughout 2003 and grabbed the headlines again that year, at the Memorial Van Damme race in Belgium. By winning here, it meant that she became sole winner of the 2003 IAAF Golden League one million dollar jackpot, awarded to athletes who remained undefeated in all six competitions in the season. She put part of her winnings towards the foundation that she had established in her name in Mozambique.

Aiming to become the first woman to successfully defend the Olympic 800 m title in 2004, her fifth Olympics, Mutola ended up finishing fourth. Despite carrying a hamstring injury, Mutola was in the gold medal position until the final few metres, when three athletes passed her, including the eventual champion, her former training partner Kelly Holmes. In 2005, her injuries were still lingering and she suffered several losses to opponents she would normally easily beat. Mutola finished fourth in the 800 m at the 2005 World Championships in Helsinki; third-place winner Tatyana Andrianova was retroactively suspended for a doping violation in 2015. A later test invalidated Andrianova's results from 9 August 2005 through 8 August 2007. On April 14, 2016, the Court of Arbitration for Sport (CAS) overturned Andrianova's two-year doping suspension because her sample had been re-tested beyond the eight-year statute of limitations. "As the eight-year statute of limitations had expired prior to January 1, 2015, the 10-year statute of limitations provided under the new 2015 anti-doping rules cannot apply", CAS said in a statement.

Mutola parted amicably with her coach Margo Jennings, before returning to good form in 2006, when she won the World Indoor Championships title for a record seventh time. At the 2007 IAAF World Championships, Mutola was in contention for a medal entering into the home straight, but pulled out of the race in the dying metres.

In 2008, the 800 metres African record held by Mutola, was beaten by the young Pamela Jelimo of Kenya. Mutola had decided that the 2008 Olympic Games would be her last major championships, and she finished fifth in the 800 metres Olympic final. She publicly called an end to her 21-year-long athletics career at the Weltklasse Zürich meeting immediately after the Olympics. She finished fourth with a run of 1:58.71 in the 800 m, again behind Jelimo, who completed a symbolic feat by beating Mutola's meet record which had stood since 1994.

Her appearance at the 2008 Olympics made her only the fourth female track and field athlete to compete at six Olympics, after Lia Manoliu (discus), Tessa Sanderson (javelin/heptathlon), and seven-time Olympian Merlene Ottey (sprints).

== Achievements ==
=== International competitions ===
Year	Competition	Venue	Position	Event	Notes
Representing Mozambique
1988	African Championships	Annaba, Algeria	2nd	800 m	2:06.55
1988	Summer Olympics	Seoul, South Korea	21st (h)	800 m	2:04.36
1990	African Championships	Cairo, Egypt	1st	800 m	2:13.54
1990	African Championships	Cairo, Egypt	1st	1500 m	4:25.27
1991	World Championships	Tokyo, Japan	4th	800 m	1:57.63
1991	All-Africa Games	Cairo, Egypt	1st	800 m	2:04.02
1992	Summer Olympics	Barcelona, Spain	5th	800 m	1:57.49
1992	Summer Olympics	Barcelona, Spain	9th	1500 m	4:02.60
1993	World Indoor Championships	Toronto, Canada	1st	800 m	1:57.55
1993	African Championships	Durban, South Africa	1st	800 m	1:56.36 (CR)
1993	World Championships	Stuttgart, Germany	1st	800 m	1:55.43
1993	IAAF Grand Prix Final	London, United Kingdom	1st	800 m	1:57.35
1995	World Indoor Championships	Barcelona, Spain	1st	800 m	1:57.62
1995	World Championships	Gothenburg, Sweden	— (sf)	800 m	DQ
1995	All-Africa Games	Harare, Zimbabwe	1st	800 m	1:56.99
1995	IAAF Grand Prix Final	Fontvieille, Monaco	1st	800 m	1:55.72
1996	Summer Olympics	Atlanta, United States	3rd	800 m	1:58.71
1997	World Indoor Championships	Paris, France	1st	800 m	1:58.96
1997	World Championships	Athens, Greece	3rd	800 m	1:57.59
1997	IAAF Grand Prix Final	Fukuoka City, Japan	2nd	800 m	1:56.93
1998	African Championships	Dakar, Senegal	1st	800 m	1:57.95
1998	Commonwealth Games	Kuala Lumpur, Malaysia	1st	800 m	1:57.60
1999	World Indoor Championships	Maebashi, Japan	2nd	800 m	1:57.17
1999	World Championships	Seville, Spain	2nd	800 m	1:56.72
1999	All-Africa Games	Johannesburg, South Africa	1st	800 m	1:59.73
1999	IAAF Grand Prix Final	Munich, Germany	1st	800 m	1:59.10
2000	Summer Olympics	Sydney, Australia	1st	800 m	1:56.15
2001	World Indoor Championships	Lisbon, Portugal	1st	800 m	1:59.74
2001	World Championships	Edmonton, Canada	1st	800 m	1:57.17
2001	IAAF Grand Prix Final	Melbourne, Australia	1st	800 m	1:59.78
2002	African Championships	Radès, Tunisia	1st	800 m	2:03.11
2002	Commonwealth Games	Manchester, United Kingdom	1st	800 m	1:57.35
2003	World Indoor Championships	Birmingham, United Kingdom	1st	800 m	1:58.94
2003	World Championships	Paris, France	1st	800 m	1:59.89
2003	IAAF World Athletics Final	Fontvieille, Monaco	1st	800 m	1:59.59
2004	World Indoor Championships	Budapest, Hungary	1st	800 m	1:58.50
2004	Summer Olympics	Athens, Greece	4th	800 m	1:56.51
2005	World Championships	Helsinki, Finland	4th	800 m	1:59.71
2006	World Indoor Championships	Moscow, Russia	1st	800 m	1:58.90
2006	Commonwealth Games	Melbourne, Australia	3rd	800 m	1:58.77
2006	African Championships	Bambous, Mauritius	2nd	800 m	2:01.08
2007	World Championships	Osaka, Tokyo	— (f)	800 m	DNF
2008	World Indoor Championships	Valencia, Spain	3rd	800 m	2:02.97
2008	African Championships	Addis Ababa, Ethiopia	2nd	800 m	2:00.47
2008	Summer Olympics	Beijing, China	5th	800 m	1:57.68
Representing Africa
1992	IAAF World Cup	Havana, Cuba	1st	800 m	2:00.47
1994	IAAF World Cup	London, United Kingdom	1st	800 m	1:58.27
1998	IAAF World Cup	Johannesburg, South Africa	1st	800 m	1:59.88
2002	IAAF World Cup	Madrid, Spain	1st	800 m	1:58.60

=== Personal bests ===
Type	Event	Mark	Date	Location
Outdoor	200 m	23.86	20 July 1994	Langenthal, Switzerland
Outdoor	400 m	51.37	2 August 1994	Monaco
Outdoor	600 m	1:22.87	27 August 2002	Liège, Belgium
Outdoor	800 m	1:55.19	17 August 1994	Zürich, Switzerland
Outdoor	1000 m	2:29.34	25 August 1995	Brussels, Belgium
Outdoor	1500 m	4:01.50	12 July 2002	Rome, Italy
Outdoor	One mile	4:36.09	21 June 1991	Eugene, United States
Outdoor	2000 m	6:03.84	1 January 1992	
Outdoor	3000 m	9:27.37	8 June 1991	Springfield, United States
Outdoor	5000 m	18:15.10	18 July 1990	
Indoor	600 m	1:25.79	7 March 1999	Maebashi, Japan
Indoor	800 m	1:57.06	21 February 1999	Liévin, France
Indoor	1000 m	2:30.94	25 February 1999	Stockholm, Sweden
Indoor	1500 m	4:17.93	1 February 1992	Portland, United States

=== 800 m honours ===
- Olympic Games: 1988 first round; 1992 5th and 9th 1500 m; 1996 3rd; 2000 1st; 2004 4th; 2008 5th
- World Championships: 1991 4th; 1993 1st; 1995 disqualified semi final; 1997 3rd; 1999 2nd; 2001 1st; 2003 1st, 2005 4th, 2007 Did not Finish Final
- World Indoor Championships: 1993 1st; 1995 1st; 1997 1st; 1999 2nd; 2001 1st; 2003 1st; 2004 1st; 2006 1st; 2007 3rd
- World Cup: 1992 1st and 3rd 4 × 400 m Relay; 1994 1st; 1998 1st; 2002 1st and 4th 4 × 400 m Relay
- All-Africa Games: 1991 1st; 1995 1st; 1999 1st
- African Championships: 1988 2nd; 1990 1st and 1st 1500 m; 1993 1st; 1998 1st; 2002 1st; 2006 2nd; 2008 2nd
- Commonwealth Games: 1998 1st; 2002 1st; 2006 3rd

=== Awards ===
- Track & Field News Athlete of the Year: 2003

== See also ==
- List of athletes with the most appearances at Olympic Games

Olympic Games
Preceded by Daniel Firmino	Flagbearer for Mozambique; 1996 Atlanta	Succeeded by Jorge Duvane
Awards
Preceded by Paula Radcliffe	Women's Track & Field Athlete of the Year; 2003	Succeeded by Yelena Isinbayeva
