= Anna Rostkowska =

Polish middle-distance runner

Personal information
- Full name: Anna Zagórska-Rostkowska
- Nationality: Poland
- Born: 26 July 1980 (age 45) Lwówek Śląski, Poland
- Height: 1.72 m (5 ft 7 1/2 in)
- Weight: 53 kg (117 lb)

Sport
- Sport: Athletics
- Event: Middle distance running
- Club: KS Athletics Jakać Młoda
- Coached by: Piotr Rostkowski

Achievements and titles
- Personal best: 800 m: 1:58.72 (2008)
Medal record
Women's athletics
Representing Poland
European Indoor Championships
Silver medal – second place	2002 Vienna	4x400 m relay
Universiade
Silver medal – second place	2003 Jeju City	800 m
European U23 Championships
Gold medal – first place	2001 Amsterdam	800 m

Anna Rostkowska (née Zagórska; born 26 July 1980) is a Polish middle-distance runner, who specialized in the 800 metres. She won a gold medal for the 800 metres at the 2001 European Athletics U23 Championships in Amsterdam, Netherlands, and silver at the 2003 Summer Universiade in Jeju City, South Korea. She also set a personal best time of 1:58.72 by finishing fourth at the 2008 ÅF Golden League in Saint-Denis, Paris.

Rostkowska made her official debut for the 2008 Summer Olympics in Beijing, where she competed in the women's 800 metres. She ran in the first heat of the event, against six other athletes, including Russia's Svetlana Klyuka, who nearly missed out of the medal podium in the final. She came only in third place by five hundredths of a second (0.05) ahead of Great Britain's Jemma Simpson, with a time of 2:02.11. Rostkowska advanced into the next round of the competition, as she secured the final mandatory qualifying slot in the first heat. Rostkowska, however, fell short in her bid for the final, as she placed fifth in the second heat of the semifinal rounds, with a time of 1:58.84.
