= Faith Macharia =

Kenyan middle-distance runner

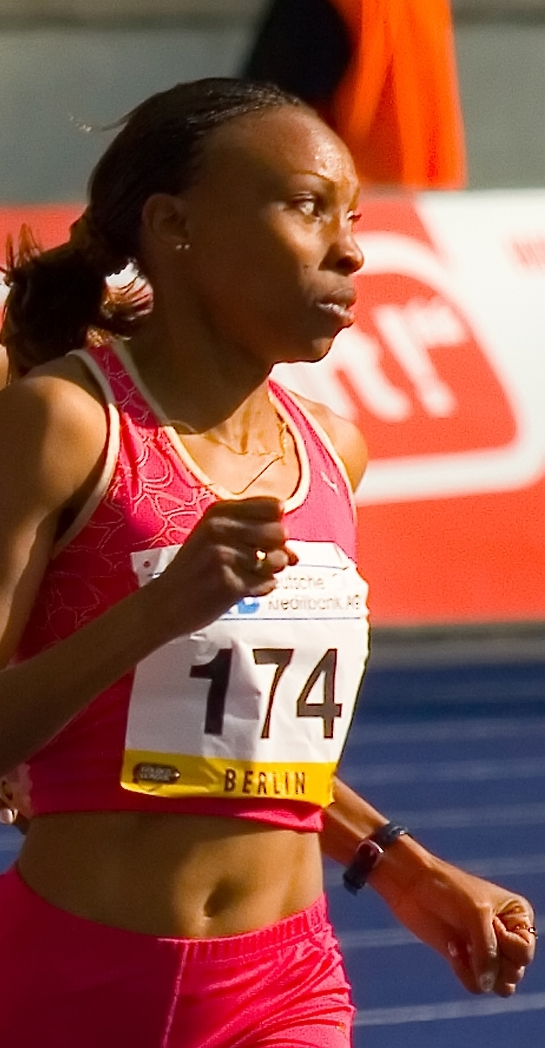
Macharia at the 2007 ISTAF Berlin

Faith Macharia (born 9 February 1976, Nyeri, Kenya) is a Kenyan middle-distance runner who specializes in the 800 metres.

In 2001, she set a new Kenyan record over 1000 metres (2:35.39), still valid in 2007.

She trains with PACE Sports Management and is coached by Ricky Simms.

== Competition record ==
Year	Competition	Venue	Position	Event	Notes
Representing Kenya
2001	World Championships	Edmonton, Canada	4th	800 m	1:58.98
2001	IAAF Grand Prix Final	Melbourne, Australia	7th	800 m	
2002	Commonwealth Games	Manchester, United Kingdom	9th (sf)	800 m	2:03.48
2003	World Championships	Paris, France	14th (sf)	800 m	2:01.30
2003	World Athletics Final	Monte Carlo, Monaco	4th	800 m	
2003	All-Africa Games	Abuja, Nigeria	4th	800 m	2:03.44
2004	Olympic Games	Athens, Greece	34th (h)	800 m	2:06.31
2008	African Championships	Addis Ababa, Ethiopia	8th	800 m	DNF

=== Personal bests ===
- 800 metres - 1:58.34 min (2001)
- 1500 metres - 4:08.04 min (1999)
