= Brigita Langerholc =

Slovenian middle-distance runner

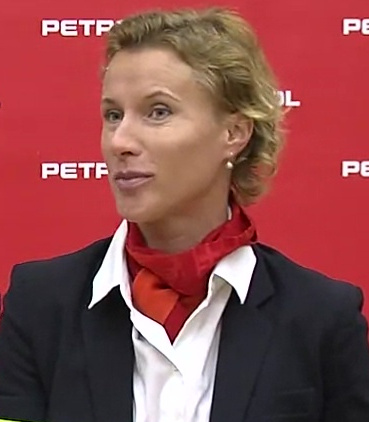
- Brigita Langerholc in 2012

Personal information
- Born: 23 July 1976 (age 50) Kranj, Slovenia

Sport
- Sport: Track and field
Medal record
Representing Slovenia
Summer Universiade
Gold medal – first place	2001 Beijing	800m
Silver medal – second place	1999 Palma de Mallorca	800m
Mediterranean Games
Silver medal – second place	2001 Tunis	800m

Brigita Langerholc (born 23 July 1976 in ) is a Slovenian middle distance runner who specializes in the 800 metres.

She finished fourth at the 2000 Summer Olympics in a then personal best time of 1:58.51 minutes. In 2001, she won the silver medal at the Mediterranean Games and a gold medal at the Universiade. She then finished fifth at the 2006 European Athletics Championships in Gothenburg and sixth at the 2007 European Indoor Championships.

She has competed at the World Championships in 1999, 2001, 2003 and 2005 without ever reaching the final.

In Osaka 2007 World championship she finished fifth in final with 1:58:52. In semifinal she ran PB 1:58.41.

Running for Gimnazia Ljubljana, she set the Slovenian national high school record in the 400 metres. She followed that with a 5th place showing at the 1995 European Athletics Junior Championships. She attended college at the University of Southern California, where she was an 8 time All American in the 800 and 4x400 relay. She won the 800 meters at the 2001 NCAA Championships to help the USC Trojans win their first women's NCAA Championship ever. Her time from the 2000 Olympics is the USC school record and Pac-12 record.

== Competition record ==
Year	Competition	Venue	Position	Event	Notes
Representing Slovenia
1993	European Junior Championships	San Sebastián, Spain	7th	400 m	54.93
1995	European Junior Championships	Nyíregyháza, Hungary	5th	400 m	54.40
1996	European Indoor Championships	Stockholm, Sweden	–	400 m	DQ
1997	European U23 Championships	Turku, Finland	5th	400 m	53.80
1999	Universiade	Palma de Mallorca, Spain	2nd	800 m	1:59.87
1999	World Championships	Seville, Spain	15th (sf)	800 m	2:04.51
2000	Olympic Games	Sydney, Australia	4th	800 m	1:58.51
2001	World Championships	Edmonton, Canada	11th (h)	800 m	2:01.05
2001	Universiade	Beijing, China	1st	800 m	2:00.96
2001	Mediterranean Games	Tunis, Tunisia	2nd	800 m	2:04.91
2002	European Championships	Munich, Germany	10th (sf)	800 m	2:02.43
2003	World Indoor Championships	Birmingham, United Kingdom	10th (sf)	800 m	2:04.75
2003	World Championships	Paris, France	16th (sf)	800 m	2:01.58
2005	European Indoor Championships	Madrid, Spain	11th (h)	800 m	2:04.54
2005	Mediterranean Games	Almería, Spain	4th	800 m	2:03.23
2005	World Championships	Helsinki, Finland	24th (h)	800 m	2:03.06
2006	European Championships	Gothenburg, Sweden	5th	800 m	1:59.30
2007	European Indoor Championships	Birmingham, United Kingdom	6th	800 m	2:01.24
2007	World Championships	Osaka, Japan	5th	800 m	1:58.52
2008	Olympic Games	Beijing, China	18th (sf)	800 m	2:00.00

== National titles ==
- NCAA Championships
  - 800 m: 2001
