= Agnes Samaria =

Namibian middle-distance runner

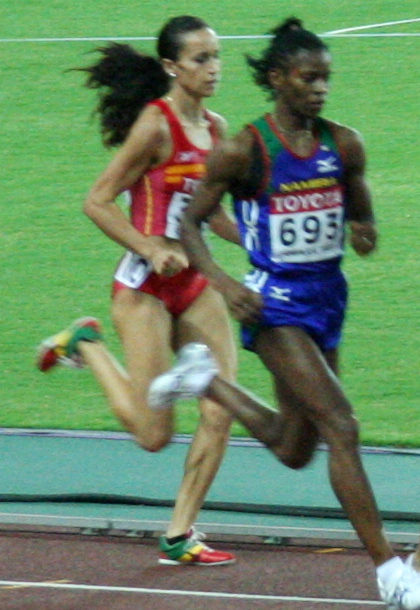
- Agnes Samaria (right) at the 2007 World Championships with Iris Fuentes-Pila (left)

Personal information
- Born: 11 August 1972 (age 53) Otjiwarongo, South-West Africa
- Height: 1.72 m (5 ft 8 in)
- Weight: 55 kg (121 lb)

Sport
- Sport: Running
- Event: 800 metres
Medal record
Women's athletics
Representing Namibia
African Championships
| Silver medal – second place | 2002 Radès | 800 m |
| Bronze medal – third place | 2008 Addis Ababa | 800 m |
| Bronze medal – third place | 2008 Addis Ababa | 1500 m |

Agnes Maryna Samaria (born 11 August 1972) is a Namibian retired middle-distance runner who specialized in the 800 metres.

Samaria won two of the three medals that the country won at the 2007 All-Africa Games. She has been a UNICEF Goodwill Ambassador since 2005.

== Competition record ==
| Year | Competition | Venue | Position | Event | Notes |
Representing Namibia
| 1995 | Universiade | Fukuoka, Japan | 25th (h) | 400 m | 57.63 |
| 1995 | Universiade | Fukuoka, Japan | 25th (h) | 800 m | 2:11.61 |
| 1999 | All-Africa Games | Johannesburg, South Africa | 17th (h) | 800 m | 2:11.58 |
| 2001 | World Championships | Edmonton, Canada | 16th (h) | 800 m | 2:03.11 |
| 2002 | Commonwealth Games | Manchester, United Kingdom | 3rd | 800 m | 1:59.15 (NR) |
| 2002 | African Championships | Radès, Tunisia | 2nd | 800 m | 2:03.63 |
| 2003 | World Indoor Championships | Birmingham, United Kingdom | 7th (sf) | 800 m | 2:01.29 |
| 2003 | World Championships | Paris, France | 23rd (sf) | 800 m | 2:02.66 |
| 2004 | World Indoor Championships | Budapest, Hungary | 16th (h) | 800 m | 2:05.05 |
| 2004 | Olympic Games | Athens, Greece | 8th (sf) | 800 m | 1:59.37 |
| 2005 | World Championships | Helsinki, Finland | 9th (sf) | 800 m | 2:00.13 |
| 2006 | African Championships | Bambous, Mauritius | 6th | 800 m | 2:07.65 |
| 2007 | World Championships | Osaka, Japan | 22nd (sf) | 800 m | 2:02.25 |
| 2007 | World Championships | Osaka, Japan | 6th | 1500 m | 4:07.61 (NR) |
| 2007 | All-Africa Games | Algiers, Algeria | 2nd | 800 m | 2:03.17 |
| 2007 | All-Africa Games | Algiers, Algeria | 3rd | 1500 m | 4:09.18 |
| 2007 | World Athletics Final | Stuttgart, Germany | 5th | 1500 m | 4:05.44 (NR) |
| 2008 | World Indoor Championships | Valencia, Spain | 14th (h) | 800 m | 2:05.23 |
| 2008 | African Championships | Addis Ababa, Ethiopia | 3rd | 800 m | 2:00.62 |
| 2008 | African Championships | Addis Ababa, Ethiopia | 3rd | 1500 m | 4:13.91 |
| 2008 | Olympic Games | Beijing, China | 26th (h) | 800 m | 2:02.18 |
| 2008 | Olympic Games | Beijing, China | 27th (h) | 1500 m | 4:15.80 |

=== Personal bests ===
- 400 metres - 53.83 s (2001)
- 800 metres - 1:59.15 min (2002)
- 1500 metres - 4:05.30 min (2008)
- Mile run - 4:25.01 min (2007)

Namibian Sports Women of the Year (2002, 2003, 2004, 2005, 2006, 2007)
