= Noelly Mankatu Bibiche =

Congolese middle-distance runner

Personal information
- Nationality: Congolese
- Born: 25 November 1980 (age 45)

Sport
- Sport: Middle-distance running
- Event: 800 metres

Noelly Mankatu Bibiche (born 25 November 1980) is a Congolese middle-distance runner. She competed in the women's 800 metres at the 2004 Summer Olympics.
