= Meskerem Assefa =

Ethiopian runner

Medal record

Women's athletics

Representing Ethiopia

African Championships
Silver medal – second place	2008 Addis Ababa	1500 m

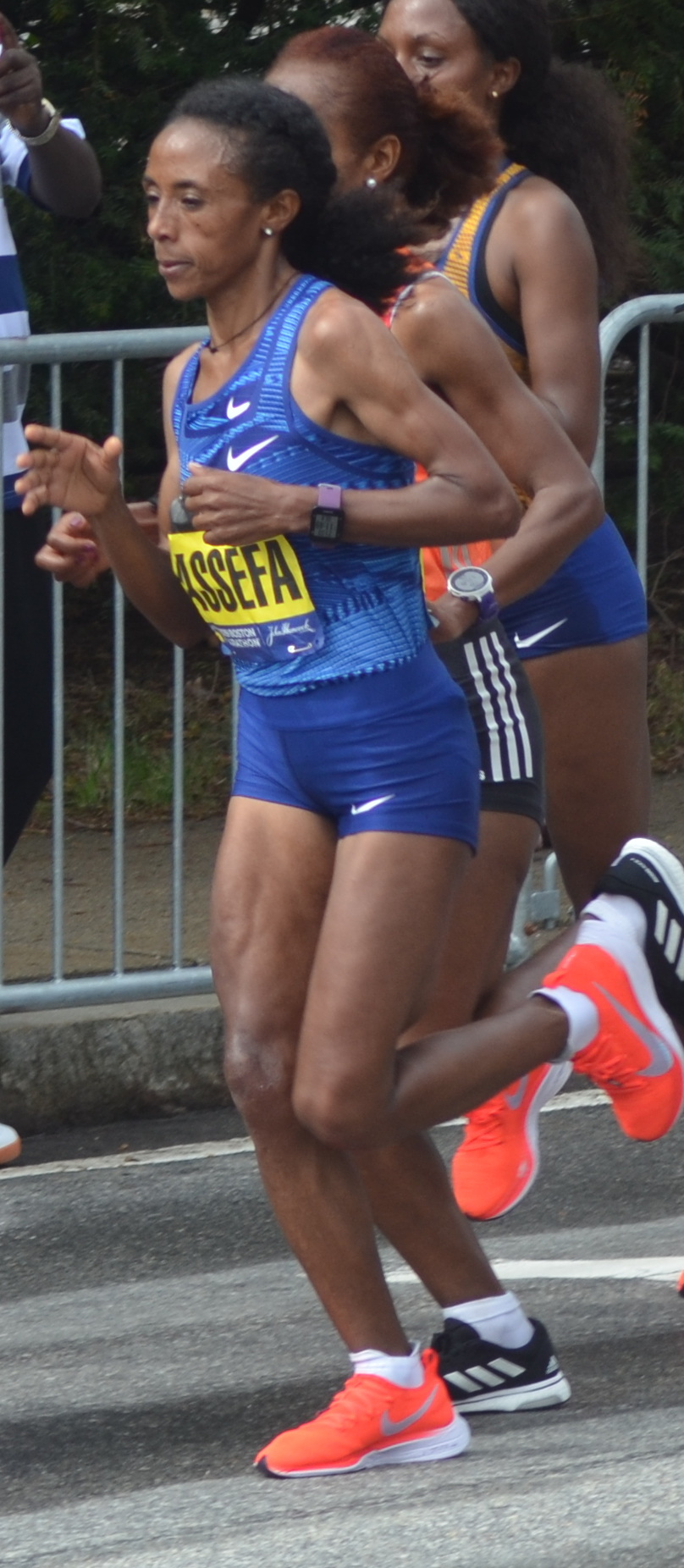
Near halfway point of 2019 Boston Marathon where she placed 4th

Meskerem Assefa Legesse Wondimagegn (Amharic: መስከረም ኣሰፋ ለገሰ ወንድምአገኝ; born 20 September 1985 in Robe, Arsi) is an Ethiopian middle- and long-distance runner. She represented Ethiopia at the 2008 and 2012 London Olympics. She has personal bests including 4:02.12 minutes for the 1500 metres, 8:46.37 minutes for the 3000 metres and 2:25:11 hours for the marathon.

Meskerem competes principally in the 1500 m. She is a two-time participant at the World Championships in Athletics and was the silver medallist at the 2008 African Championships in Athletics.

== Career ==
Meskerem started running middle-distance races in 2001 and while in Oregon in 2003 she ran an 800 metres best of 2:01.11 minutes and a 1500 metres best of 4:03.96 minutes. She was mainly based in the United States until 2007. A win at the All-Ethiopian Games in Addis Ababa and a runner-up finish at the Ethiopian Athletics Championships brought her a place at the 2007 All-Africa Games, where she placed fourth with a run of 4:09.83 minutes.

The following year brought her first major senior medal – she was the silver medallist behind Gelete Burka in the 1500 m at the 2008 African Championships in Athletics. On the Brazilian athletics circuit she had three straight wins including a personal best of 2:02.12 minutes in the 800 m in Rio de Janeiro. Her best run in the 1500 m that season was 4:05.67 minutes, which came at a meeting in Jerez de la Frontera. She was chosen to represent Ethiopia at the 2008 Summer Olympics, but she was eliminated in the first round of heats.

A runner-up finish at the national championships earned her a place at the 2009 World Championships in Athletics. She passed the first round, but did not start in the semi-final. Her best 1500 m that year (4:05.99) was at the Prefontaine Classic in Eugene, Oregon, and she also set a 3000 metres personal best of 8:46.37 minutes at the Meeting Lille Metropole. Her major competition of 2010 was the African Championships, where she was fifth over 1500 m. In the first half of the year she began to move away from middle-distance towards long-distance running: she was runner-up at the Le Mans Cross Country, set a 5000 metres time of 15:03.49 minutes for third at the GE Galan, won the Cooper River Bridge Run with a run of 32:31 minutes for the 10K, and had third-place finishes at the Carlsbad 5000 and Crescent City Classic 5K road races.

In spite of success in longer races, Meskerem focused on the 1500 m in 2011 and achieved her best results yet. She ran a career best of 4:03.63 minutes for second at the Colorful Daegu Championships Meeting, then improved this further to 4:02.12 minutes as runner-up at the Golden Gala IAAF Diamond League meeting. She ran 4:06.32 for another second place at the Brazzaville meeting and placed seventh with a run of 4:04.48 minutes at the top level Herculis meet. She ranked second to Kalkidan Gezahegne among Ethiopian runners that year. She was again chosen to represent Ethiopia on the global stage, but was eliminated in the heats of the 2011 World Championships in Athletics. She again placed fourth in the 1500 m at the 2011 All-Africa Games, just finishing off the podium.

At the start of 2012 she ran indoor bests of 4:07.65 minutes for the 1500 m and 8:53.18 minutes for the 3000 m. Outdoors, her season's best came in Daegu, where she repeated her placing of the previous year, coming second in 4:06.52 minutes. Meskerem's second Olympic appearance followed at the 2012 London Games, but again she did not progress beyond the heats of the 1500 m. After the Olympics she placed second at the DécaNation competition.

Meskerem made a significant, and successful, step up in distance at the beginning of 2013 as she entered the Houston Marathon and finished in third place with a time of 2:25:17 hours. Three months later she was runner-up to Flomena Cheyech at the Vienna Marathon.
