= Miriam Bravo =

Spanish Olimpic athletes

Personal information
- Born: 29 September 1974 (age 52) Deba, Gipuzkoa, Spain

Sport
- Sport: Track and field
Medal record
Representing Spain
Mediterranean Games
Bronze medal – third place	1997 Bari	4x400m relay

Miriam Bravo Acha (born 29 September 1974) is a retired Spanish sprinter and runner.

In the 800 metres she finished fifth at the 2001 Mediterranean Games and sixth at the 2001 Summer Universiade. In the 400 metres she finished ninth at the 2002 IAAF World Cup.

Bravo has 2:01.80 minutes personal best in the 800 metres, achieved in June 2001 in Seville; and 53.29 seconds in the 400 metres, achieved in July 2000 in Madrid.

She represented Spain in the 2000 Summer Olympics in the 4×400 meters relay.

She was, in several times, champion and sub champion of Spain of 400 and 800 meters.
