= Akosua Serwaa =

Ghanaian middle-distance runner

Akosua Serwaa (born 3 January 1981, in Kumasi) is a Ghanaian middle-distance runner who specializes in the 800 metres.

She finished seventh at the 2003 World Championships in Paris and won a silver medal at the 2003 All-Africa Games in Abuja.

Her personal best time is 1:59.60 minutes, achieved in July 2004 in Rome.
