= Pamela Jelimo =

Kenyan middle-distance runner

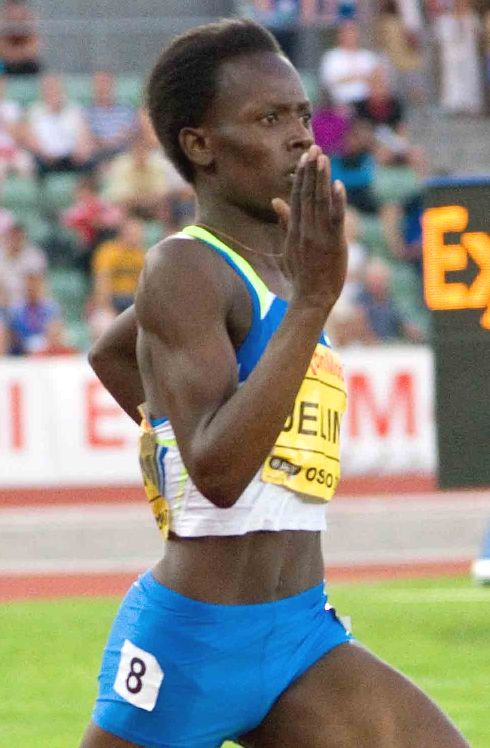

Personal information
- Born: 5 December 1989 (age 36) Nandi District, Rift Valley Province, Kenya
- Height: 175 cm (5 ft 9 in)
- Weight: 60 kg (132 lb)
Medal record
Women's athletics
Representing Kenya
Olympic Games
Gold medal – first place	2008 Beijing	800 m
Silver medal – second place	2012 London	800 m
World Indoor Championships
Gold medal – first place	2012 Istanbul	800m
African Championships
Gold medal – first place	2008 Addis Ababa	800 m
Silver medal – second place	2008 Addis Ababa	4×400 m

Pamela Jelimo (born 5 December 1989) is a Kenyan middle-distance runner, specialising in the 800 metres. She won the gold medal in 800 metres at the 2008 Olympics in Beijing at the age of 18. She is the first Kenyan woman to win an Olympic gold medal and also the first Kenyan to win the Golden League Jackpot. She holds both the 800 m world junior record and the senior African record over the same distance. Jelimo is also one of the youngest women to win an Olympic gold medal for Kenya.

== Early life ==
Pamela Jelimo was born in Kiptomok village, Nandi District, Rift Valley Province. Her mother, Esther Cheptoo Keter, was a promising 200 metres and 400 metres runner, but the customs of the Nandi tribe meant that as the last-born daughter she could not marry and had to care for her parents in their old age. However, she was allowed to bear children to different men; thus, Jelimo was raised by her mother in a family of three brothers and six sisters. Jelimo began running in 2003, aged 13, at Koyo Secondary in the Kaptumo division, near Kapsabet. She quickly established herself as an accomplished athlete, winning at schools' championships in the 100 metres, 200 m, 400 m, 800 metres, 400 metres hurdles, and heptathlon. Her high school games teacher Philip Ng'eno remarked that she used to compete with the boys in sprint events as the girls did not provide the competition she needed.

The family was poor and struggled to pay the fees to send Jelimo to secondary school – her two older siblings had already dropped out as they were unable to meet the costs. She refused to quit and began selling milk from the family cattle to pay her fees, traversing steep slopes on foot to sell it at Chemase market. The school headmaster Daniel Maru donated money for track suits and running shoes so that Jelimo could attend Kenya's centre of excellence for distance running. By 2004, Jelimo had reached the local provincial championships in the 400 m. Maru continued his generosity, allowing the young athlete to graduate while she still owed one year's worth of fees. Still, her mother was forced to sell her last cow so Jelimo could take her exams. Her family always supported her education.

In June 2007 she finished fifth in the 400 metres race at the Kenyan Championships with a time of 55.82 seconds. She kept improving throughout the season, winning the 400 metres gold medal at the African Junior Championships with a finish of 54.93 s and setting a Kenyan national junior record in the 200 m with 24.68 s. Jelimo was pleased with her accomplishments but her new coach Zaid Kipkemboi Aziz suggested that she change to 800 m, stating that she would perform best over the longer distance. She began working for the Kenyan police force and was training with fellow Kenyan runner Janeth Jepkosgei.

Jelimo ran her first 800 metres race on 19 April 2008 at the Kenyan trials for the African championships, clocking 2:01.02 minutes. Despite her budding athletics career, she continued to work at the Embu Police station as a police constable, earning KSh.11,000/= a month (roughly €100).

== Breakthrough and Olympic Gold 2008 ==
She made her breakthrough at the 2008 African Championships in Athletics aged 18. Her time, 1:58.70, was a new national junior record. On 25 May 2008 she won 800 metres at the Hengelo Grand Prix event and set a new Junior World Record of 1:55.76. The previous record (1:57.18) was set by Yuan Wang of China in 1993. The previous Kenyan record was held by Janeth Jepkosgei (1:56.04 in 2007). On 1 June 2008 she ran an impressive 800 m race in Berlin and won the ISTAF Golden League in 1:54.99, a new African record. The previous African record (1:55.19) was set by Maria Mutola in 1994.

On 18 July 2008 she bettered the record slightly to 1:54.97 in Paris. It was also her fourth consecutive win in ÅF Golden League, where she was one of only two remaining jackpot contenders, the other being high jumper Blanka Vlašić. On 18 August 2008 Jelimo won gold in the 800 metres at the Beijing Olympics. Her time was 1:54.87, again a record. She became the first Kenyan woman to win an Olympic gold medal.

She continued her unbeaten streak by winning the Weltklasse Golden League meeting in Zurich on 29 August 2008 improving her personal best to 1:54.01. This was the third fastest performance ever, behind only Nadezhda Olizarenko and the world record of Jarmila Kratochvílová. At the Memorial van Damme competition in Brussels, the ÅF Golden League final, Jelimo won the 800 metres with a time of 1:55.16. As the only athlete to win the same event at all six Golden League meetings, she won the competition's jackpot of $1,000,000. The only other remaining, Blanca Vlasic, failed to win the last event. She is the first Kenyan to win Golden League jackpot.

She crowned her unbeaten season by winning her race at the 2008 IAAF World Athletics Final. After the event she returned to Kenya for the first time since the Olympic trials and was welcomed by major festivities. On 18 September 2008 in Kapsabet Town, a street – Pamela Jelimo Street – was named in her honour.

Jelimo was shortlisted for the IAAF World Athlete of the Year women's category alongside Yelena Isinbayeva and Tirunesh Dibaba, but the award was won by Isinbayeva. Jelimo was awarded the IAAF Revelation of the Year Award and the 2008 Kenyan Sportswoman of the Year Award.

Instead, she started her season in April at the Athletics Kenya meeting in Kakamega, running 200 and 1500 metres races for training purposes. On 23 May she ran her first 800 metres race of the year at the Meeting International Mohammed VI in Rabat, Morocco, finishing sixth (time 2:02.46) – it was the first 800 m race that she did not win. Two weeks later she finished last at the Prefontaine Classic meeting in Eugene, Oregon. Due to these dismal results, she concentrated on training for over a month. She successfully returned to track by winning the Heusden-Zolder meeting on 18 July running under two minutes (1:59.59).

She competed at the 2009 World Championships but did not finish her semi-final.

Jelimo returned to competition in April 2010, winning the 800 metres race at the Athletic Kenya meeting in Nakuru. She finished 8th at the Diamond League meeting in Shanghai, China. She failed to qualify for the 2010 African Championships held in Nairobi.

At the 2011 Prefontaine Classic she finished last in the 800 metres race, timing 2:09.12, almost nine seconds behind the second last runner, Jemma Simpson. It was Jelimo's best time of the season recorded by IAAF.

== 2012 comeback ==
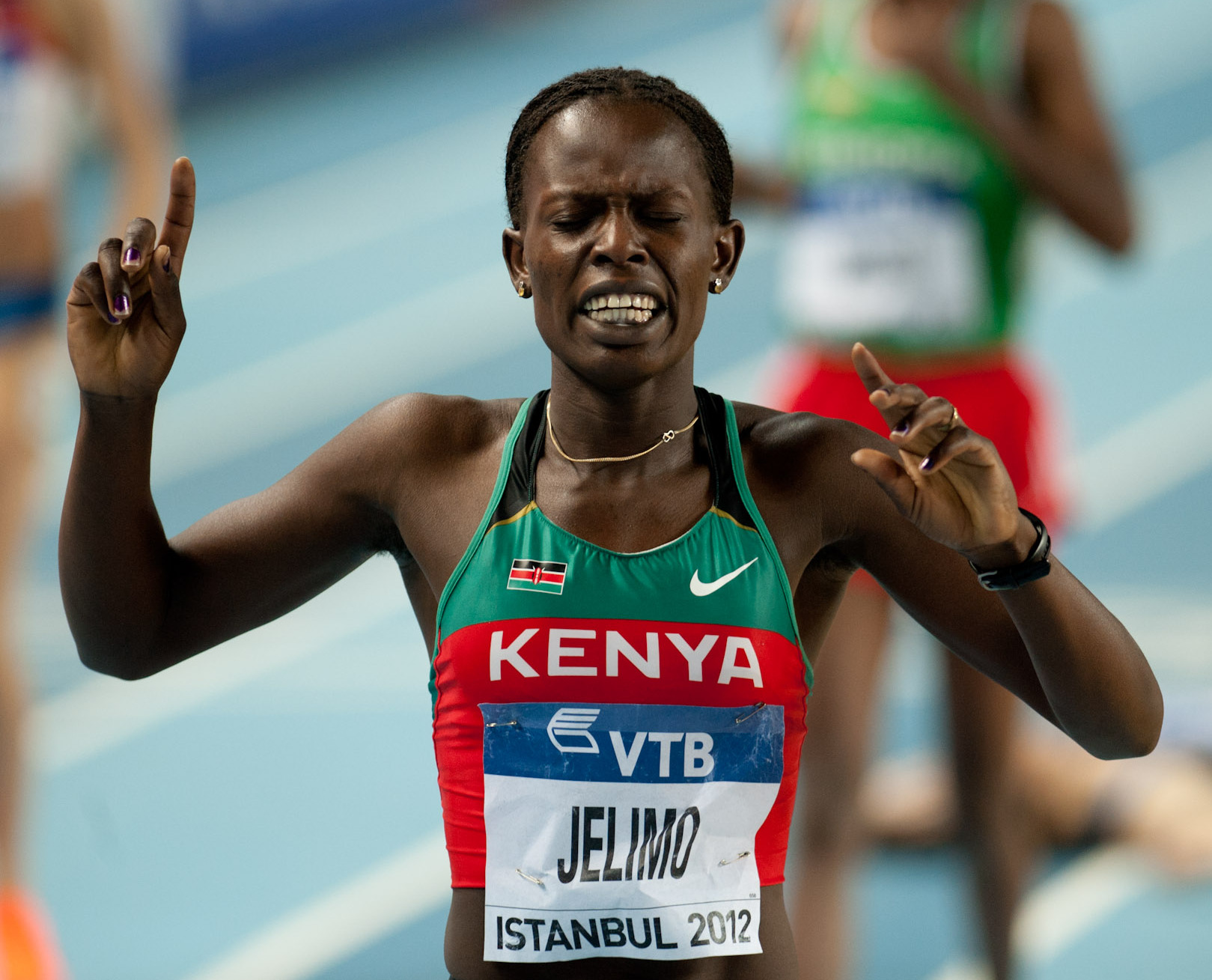
Jelimo celebrating her win at the 2012 World Indoor Championships.

Jelimo had a promising start for the 2012 season finishing second behind Malika Akkaoui of Morocco in an indoor meeting at Lievin, France, running eason was crowned by gold medal at the 2012 World Indoor Championships in Istanbul, Turkey, improving her time to 1:58.83 seconds. She was almost a second ahead of the silver medallist Nataliia Lupu of Ukraine.

She began the outdoor season with a win at the Doha 2012 Diamond League meeting in a meeting record time of 1:56.94 minutes. She was beaten by Fantu Magiso at the Golden Gala, but was victorious at the Kenyan trials and then set a world-leading time of 1:56.76 at the KBC Night of Athletics.

At the 2012 Olympics, Jelimo finished in fourth place. In November 2015, the World Anti-Doping Agency recommended two Russian women who finished in first and third be given lifetime bans for their doping violations at the Olympics. The International Olympic Committee has issued disqualification for Mariya Savinova. The IOC in 2024 disqualified the other athlete. The IOC Executive Board has as yet not reallocated the silver and bronze medals.

== Personal life ==
Jelimo's love life has remained private though she had a close relationship with a runner in late 2007. It was not revealed in public until December 2008.

== Achievements ==
=== Personal bests ===
Date	Event	Venue	Time
July 2007	200 metres	Ouagadougou, Burkina Faso	24.68 secs
14 June 2012	400 metres	Nairobi, Kenya	52.14 secs
5 July 2012	600 metres	Liège, Belgium	1:23.35 mins
29 August 2008	800 metres	Zürich, Switzerland	1:54.01 mins
17 April 2009	1500 metres	Kakamega, Kenya	4:19.31 mins

Correct as of 2026. All information from IAAF profile.

=== Competition record ===
Year	Competition	Venue	Position	Event	Notes
Representing Kenya
2007	African Junior Championships	Ouagadougou, Burkina Faso	3rd	200 m	
2007	African Junior Championships	Ouagadougou, Burkina Faso	1st	400 m	
2008	African Championships	Addis Ababa, Ethiopia	1st	800 m	1:58.70
2008	African Championships	Addis Ababa, Ethiopia	2nd	4 × 400 m relay	3:37.67
2008	Olympic Games	Beijing, China	1st	800 m	1:54.82
2008	World Athletics Final	Stuttgart, Germany	1st	800 m	
2009	World Championships	Berlin, Germany	20th (h)	800 m	2:03.50
2012	World Indoor Championships	Istanbul, Turkey	1st	800 m	1:58.83
2012	Olympic Games	London, United Kingdom	2nd	800 m	1:57.59
