= Mihaela Neacșu =

Romanian middle-distance runner

Mihaela Neacşu
Personal information
- Full name: Mihaela Silvia Neacşu
- Nationality: Romania
- Born: 3 May 1979 (age 47) Craiova, Romania
- Height: 1.70 m (5 ft 7 in)
- Weight: 56 kg (123 lb)

Sport
- Sport: Athletics
- Event: 800 metres
- Club: Mizuno Track Club (JPN)
- Coached by: Matei Cristeana (ROU)

Achievements and titles
- Personal bests: 800 m: 1:59.78 (2005); 1500 m: 4:10.09 (2009)

Mihaela Silvia Neacşu (born 3 May 1979 in Craiova) is a Romanian middle distance runner. She is a national indoor champion for the 800 metres, and outdoor for the 1500 metres. She set a personal best time of 1:59.78 by winning the gold medal for the 800 metres at the second meet of IAAF Golden Grand Prix in Thessaloniki, Greece.

At age twenty-nine, Neacsu made her official debut for the 2008 Summer Olympics in Beijing, where she competed in the women's 800 metres. She ran in the fifth and final heat of the event, against six other athletes, including Morocco's Hasna Benhassi, who eventually won the bronze medal in the final. She finished the race in sixth place by nearly two seconds behind U.S. middle distance runner Hazel Clark-Riley, with a time of 2:03.03. Neacsu, however, failed to advance into the semi-finals, as she placed twenty-eighth overall, and was ranked farther below three mandatory slots for the next round.
