= Svetlana Cherkasova =

Russian middle distance runner

Svetlana Sergeyevna Cherkasova (Russian: Светлана Сергеевна Черкасова; born May 20, 1978) is a Russian middle-distance runner. In the 800 metres, she finished eighth at 2006 European Athletics Championships in Gothenburg. She also competed at the 2004 Olympics.

On 31 July 2008, Cherkasova was one of seven female Russian athletes suspended by the IAAF, due to doping test irregularities. On 20 October 2008, it was announced that Cherkasova, along with 6 other Russian athletes would receive two-year doping bans for manipulating drug samples.

== Personal bests ==
- 800 metres – 1:56.93 (2005)
- 1500 metres – 4:05.55 (2003)

== See also ==
- List of doping cases in athletics
- Doping at the Olympic Games
- 800 metres at the World Championships in Athletics
- Russia at the World Athletics Championships
- Doping at the World Athletics Championships
