= Elizet Banda =

Zambian runner (born 1988)

Elizet Banda (born 16 February 1988 in Chingola) is a Zambian runner who specializes in the 1500 metres.

She finished eighth at the 2006 World Junior Championships and ninth at the 2008 African Championships. She also competed at the 2006 Commonwealth Games.

Her personal best time is 4:25.04 minutes, achieved in July 2006 in Windhoek.
