= Seltana Aït Hammou =

Moroccan middle-distance runner

Personal information
- Native name: سلطانة آيت حمو
- Nationality: Morocco
- Born: May 21, 1980 (age 46) Kenitra, Morocco

Sport
- Sport: Athletics
- Event(s): 800 metres, 1500 metres

Seltana Aït Hammou (Arabic: سلطانة آيت حمو; born 21 May 1980) is a Moroccan middle-distance runner who specialises in the 800 metres. She represented her country at the 2004 Summer Olympics and has also competed at the World Championships in Athletics and the IAAF World Indoor Championships. She has also been the gold medallist at number of major events including the 2001 Mediterranean Games, the 2003 Military World Games, the 2007 Pan Arab Games and the 2009 Jeux de la Francophonie.

She received a one-year ban from the sport of athletics in 2008 for missing three doping tests. She is the sister of Mina Aït Hammou, another successful Moroccan middle-distance athlete.

== Career ==
Born in Kenitra, she made her first international appearance for Morocco at the 1998 IAAF World Cross Country Championships, where she was sixtieth in the long race. She was twelfth in the 10,000 metres at the 1998 World Junior Championships in Athletics and competed in the junior race at the 1999 IAAF World Cross Country Championships. He first junior honours came at the 1999 African Junior Athletics Championships, at which she won the 1500 metres silver behind Jeruto Kiptum. She convinced her older sister Mina Aït Hammou to switch from handball and soccer to athletics, which led to much success for the pair. The younger Seltana was the first to win international medals as she became the 800 m champion at the 2001 Mediterranean Games. The following year she took fifth place at the 2002 African Championships in Athletics and won the 800 m gold and 400 metres silver medal at the 2002 Africa Military Games.

Aït Hammou competed on the world track stage for the first time at the 2003 World Championships in Athletics, and she came close to reaching the 800 m final, finishing third in her semi-final (in which her sister won and went on to take fourth in the final). She closed the year at the 2003 Military World Games and became the 800 m gold medallist at the event.

Her first major indoor competition came in the form of the 2004 IAAF World Indoor Championships and she reached the semi-finals, finishing fifth. Her first Olympics also came that year at the 2004 Athens Olympics and she again reached the global level semi-finals, but she and her sister suffered the same fate of being eliminated at that stage. Her other large competition that year was the 2004 Pan Arab Games in Algiers, where she won the silver medal. She ran at the 2005 World Championships in Athletics, failing to make it past the heats, but she scored an 800/1500 m double at the 2005 Jeux de la Francophonie at the end of the year.

Aït Hammou won the 1500 m gold medal at the 2007 Pan Arab Games, and also joined her sister in the Moroccan team to win the silver in the 4×400 metres relay. After being eliminated in the semi-finals at the 2008 IAAF World Indoor Championships she was preparing to compete at the 2008 Summer Olympics. This was not to be, however, as both she and her sister were banned from competition by the IAAF for missing three out of competition doping tests between June 2007 and May 2008, resulting in a year-long ban from the sport. She returned at the end of the 2009 season and competed at the 2009 Jeux de la Francophonie. She won the 800 m gold and also took 1500 m bronze in a closely run Moroccan sweep of the event, with Btissam Lakhouad and Siham Hilali the other medallists.

== Personal bests ==
Event	Time (min)	Venue	Date
800 m	1:59.59	Gateshead, England	11 June 2006
1500 m	4:12.9	Meknès, Morocco	24 May 2003
3000 m	8:59.2	Rabat, Morocco	24 May 1998

- All information taken from IAAF profile.

== See also ==
- List of doping cases in athletics
