= Amina Aït Hammou =

Moroccan runner (born 1978)

Personal information
- Born: 18 July 1978 (age 48) Kenitra, Morocco

Sport
- Sport: Track and field
Medal record
Representing Morocco
African Championships
Bronze medal – third place	2002 Radès	800 m

Amina Aït Hammou (Arabic: أمينة أيت حمو; born 18 July 1978) is a Moroccan runner who specializes in the 800 metres. Her personal best time is 1:57.82 minutes, achieved in July 2003 in Rome.

She received a year-long ban from competition in 2008 after missing three tests.

== Achievements ==
Year	Competition	Venue	Position	Event	Notes
Representing Morocco
2001	Mediterranean Games	Radès, Tunisia	4th	800 m	
2002	African Championships	Radès, Tunisia	3rd	800 m	
2003	World Championships	Paris, France	4th	800 m	
2003	World Athletics Final	Monte Carlo, Monaco	3rd	800 m	
2004	World Athletics Final	Monte Carlo, Monaco	3rd	800 m	
2007	Pan Arab Games	Cairo, Egypt	2nd	800 m	2:08.85
2007	Pan Arab Games	Cairo, Egypt	2nd	4 × 400 m relay	3:44.85

== See also ==
- List of doping cases in athletics
