= National records in the 800 metres =

The following table is an overview of national records in the 800 metres.

== Outdoor ==
=== Men ===
Country	Time	Athlete	Date	Place	Ref.	Video
Kenya	1:40.91	David Rudisha	9 August 2012	London		
Denmark	1:41.11	Wilson Kipketer	24 August 1997	Cologne		
Canada	1:41.20	Marco Arop	10 August 2024	Paris-St-Denis		
Algeria	1:41.46	Djamel Sedjati	12 July 2024	Monaco		
France	1:41.61	Gabriel Tual	7 July 2024	Paris		
United States	1:41.67	Bryce Hoppel	10 August 2024	Paris-St-Denis		
Great Britain	1:41.73	Sebastian Coe	10 June 1981	Florence		
Botswana	1:41.73	Nijel Amos	9 August 2012	London		
Brazil	1:41.77	Joaquim Cruz	26 August 1984	Cologne		
Spain	1:42.04	Mohamed Attaoui	12 July 2024	Monaco		
Ireland	1:42.15	Cian McPhillips	20 September 2025	Tokyo		
Sudan	1:42.23	Abubaker Kaki	4 June 2010	Oslo		
Ethiopia	1:42.37	Mohammed Aman	6 September 2013	Brussels		
Belgium	1:42.43	Eliott Crestan	7 July 2024	Paris		
Russia	1:42.47	Yuriy Borzakovskiy	24 August 2001	Brussels		
Bosnia and Herzegovina	1:42.51	Amel Tuka	17 July 2015	Monaco		
Switzerland	1:42.55	André Bucher	17 August 2001	Zurich		
Australia	1:42.55	Peter Bol	11 July 2025	Fontvieille		
Norway	1:42.58	Vebjørn Rodal	31 July 1996	Atlanta		
South Africa	1:42.69	Hezekiel Sepeng	3 September 1999	Brussels		
Jamaica	1:42.76	Navasky Anderson	20 September 2025	Tokyo		
Bahrain	1:42.79	Yusuf Saad Kamel	29 July 2008	Monaco		
Burundi	1:42.81	Jean-Patrick Nduwimana	17 August 2001	Zürich		
Cuba	1:42.85	Norberto Téllez	31 July 1996	Atlanta		
Saint Vincent and the Grenadines	1:42.87	Handal Roban	16 August 2025	Freeport		
Djibouti	1:42.97	Ayanleh Souleiman	17 July 2015	Monaco		
Sweden	1:43.13	Andreas Kramer	12 July 2024	Monaco		
Poland	1:43.22	Paweł Czapiewski	17 August 2001	Zürich		
Morocco	1:43.25	Amine Laalou	14 July 2006	Rome		
Mexico	1:43.44	Jesús Tonatiú López	9 July 2021	Marietta		
Netherlands	1:43.45	Bram Som	18 August 2006	Zürich		
Japan	1:43.45	Ko Ochiai	30 May 2026	Tokyo		
Venezuela	1:43.54	William Wuycke	7 September 1986	Rieti		
Somalia	1:43.60	Abdi Bile	16 August 1989	Zurich		
Germany	1:43.65	Willi Wülbeck	9 August 1983	Helsinki		
Saudi Arabia	1:43.66	Mohammed Al-Salhi	8 May 2009	Doha		
Latvia	1:43.67	Dmitrijs Miļkevičs	3 July 2006	Athens		
Uganda	1:43.72	Abraham Chepkirwok	5 July 2008	Madrid		
Italy	1:43.74; 1:43.7 h (Note: Rejected by World Athletics, but accepted as national record by the national athletics federation.)	Andrea Longo; Marcello Fiasconaro	3 September 2000; 27 June 1973	Rieti; Milan		
Qatar	1:43.82	Musaeb Abdulrahman Balla	8 July 2015	Barcelona		
Puerto Rico	1:43.83	Wesley Vázquez	24 August 2019	Paris		
Portugal	1:43.86	Isaac Nader	18 June 2025	Guadalajara		
Turkey	1:44.00	Ilham Tanui Özbilen	29 June 2013	Mersin		
Croatia	1:44.01	Marino Bloudek	19 July 2025	Madrid		
New Zealand	1:44.04	James Preston	25 May 2024	Pfungstadt		
Senegal	1:44.06	Moussa Fall	17 August 1988	Zurich		
Finland	1:44.10	Ari Suhonen	16 August 1989	Zurich		
Kuwait	1:44.13	Mohammad Al-Azemi	3 July 2006	Athens		
South Korea	1:44.14	Lee Jin-il	17 June 1994	Seoul		
Dominican Republic	1:44.14	Raynier Galvez	24 April 2026	Fayetteville		
Colombia	1:44.31	Rafith Rodríguez	15 May 2011	Belém		
Czech Republic	1:44.48	Jakub Dudycha	24 June 2025	Ostrava		
Tunisia	1:44.55	Abdessalem Ayouni	20 August 2025	Pfungstadt		
Nigeria	1:44.65	Edose Ibadin	30 July 2023	Washington, D.C.		
Ghana	1:44.71	Alex Amankwah	12 August 1992	Fairfax		
Iran	1:44.74	Sadjad Moradi	4 September 2005	Incheon		
Serbia	1:44.75	Slobodan Popović	15 August 1988	Linz		
Luxembourg	1:44.81	David Fiegen	18 August 2006	Zürich		
Belarus	1:44.84; 1:44.43 #	Anatoliy Makarevich; Anis Ananenka	26 August 1992; 10 July 2013	Koblenz; Budapest		
Egypt	1:44.92	Hamada Mohamed	14 July 2017	Madrid		
Romania	1:44.93	Catalin Tecuceanu	14 September 2021	Zagreb		
India	1:44.93	Mohammed Afsal	5 July 2025	Poznań		
Slovakia	1:44.94	Jozef Repčík	12 June 2008	Ostrava		
Greece	1:45.00	Panayotis Stroubakos	13 August 1997	Zürich		
Zimbabwe	1:45.03	Savieri Ngidhi	15 June 1996	Caorle		
Ukraine	1:45.08	Leonid Masunov	22 June 1984	Kyiv		
Slovenia	1:45.15	Žan Rudolf	4 August 2021	Pfungstadt		
Panama	1:45.27	Chamar Chambers	11 May 2024	Cuiabá		
Tanzania	1:45.28	Samwel Mwera	15 May 2005	Rio de Janeiro		
Hungary	1:45.37	Tamás Kazi	8 September 2013	Rieti		
Trinidad and Tobago	1:45.43	Sherridan Kirk	11 June 2005	Sacramento		
Eritrea	1:45.43	Fithawi Zaid	18 May 2024	Nijmegen		
Guyana	1:45.54	Quamel Prince	14 July 2023	Langley		
China	1:45.66	Dezhu Liu	20 April 2024	Xiamen		
Estonia	1:45.72	Uku Renek Kronbergs	16 June 2026	Jõhvi		
Haiti	1:45.74	Moise Joseph	31 May 2002	Baton Rouge		
Chile	1:45.75	Pablo Squella	12 August 1990	Hengelo		
Barbados	1:45.83	Jonathan Jones	24 March 2022	Austin		
Iraq	1:45.88	Adnan Taess	25 November 2010	Guangzhou		
Argentina	1:46.01	Luis Migueles	14 June 1986	Bratislava		
Andorra	1:46.02	Pol Moya	1 August 2026	Oordegem		
Kyrgyzstan	1:46.04 (Note: Kaveshnikov adopted Russian nationality on 31 January 2000, and his personal best of 1:45.71 run on 5 July 2000 is not considered the Kyrgyz national record)	Boris Kaveshnikov	15 July 1999	Moscow		
Malta	1:46.08	Jared Micallef	13 April 2025	Perth		
Zambia	1:46.14	Prince Mumba	1 July 2011	Burnaby		
Liechtenstein	1:46.16	Günther Hasler	20 August 1975	Zürich		
Austria	1:46.21	Michael Wildner	19 July 1992	Ingolstadt		
Bermuda	1:46.26	Aaron Evans	28 May 2010	Greensboro		
Tajikistan	1:46.28	Farhod Kuralov	23 May 2012	Jablonec nad Nisou		
Bulgaria	1:46.3 h 1:46.57	Binko Kolev; Miroslav Chochkov	12 July 1979; 8 July 1989	Celje; Sofia		
Mozambique	1:46.32	Alberto Mamba	9 June 2016	Oslo		
Mali	1:46.38	Moussa Camara	27 August 2011	Daegu		
Peru	1:46.39	Marco Vilca	11 May 2024	Cuiabá		
Eswatini	1:46.54	Ndumiso Mdziniso	1 July 1997	Kristinestad		
Ecuador	1:46.55	Bayron Piedra	25 May 2008	Belém		
Lithuania	1:46.58	Vitalij Kozlov	8 July 2008	Kaunas		
Namibia	1:46.62	Daniel Nghipandulwa	10 April 2011	Durban		
Azerbaijan	1:46.64	Alibey Sükürov	3 July 2004	Baku		
Suriname	1:46.74	Tommy Asinga	8 May 1992	Indianapolis		
Dominica	1:46.81	Dennick Luke	8 August 2024	Paris-St-Denis		
Israel	1:46.81	Noam Mamu	10 July 2025	Nembro		
Israel	1:46.46	Mark Handelsman (Note: Transferred from South Africa to Israel, Handelsman competed for Israel at the 1983 World Championships, held 3 weeks before this time was set, but his time is not recognized as a national record by the Israeli Athletic Association.)	15 July 1982	Lausanne		
Israel	1:46.49	Mark Handelsman	1 August 1983	Koblenz		
British Virgin Islands	1:46.98	Greg Rhymer	25 May 1994	Ypsilanti		
Uzbekistan	1:46.98	Erkin Isakov	23 July 2004	Bishkek		
Kazakhstan	1:46.99	Mikhail Kolganov	5 June 2004	Almaty		
Liberia	1:47.04; 1:46.96 i	Bobby True	29 April 2000; 6 March 1999	Des Moines; Indianapolis		
Palestine	1:47.04	Wesam Al-Massri	18 May 2017	Baku		
Ivory Coast	1:47.09 (Note: Bamba was listed as competing for France in this race, but probably had dual citizenship)	Siahka Bamba	6 August 2003	Castres		
Sri Lanka	1:47.13 A	Indunil Herath	16 June 2018	Nairobi		
North Macedonia	1:47.14	Vančo Stojanov	10 May 2002	Sofia		
Cyprus	1:47.17; 1:47.19	Spyros Spyrou; Christos Dimitriou	15 September 1983; 26 May 2018	Casablanca; Oordegem		
Moldova	1:47.18	Vitaliy Cherkes	19 August 2000	Staiki		
Gambia	1:47.20	Edrissa Marong	20 April 2019	Abidjan		
Chinese Taipei	1:47.24	Wang Jung-Hua	3 May 1980	Westwood		
Cook Islands	1:47.26	Alex Beddoes	31 July 2021	Tokyo		
Albania	1:47.28	David Nikolli	3 July 2021	Lignano Sabbiadoro		
Madagascar	1:47.33	Joseph Rakotoarimanana	28 July 1996	Atlanta		
Malaysia	1:47.37	Batumalai Rajakumar	26 September 1985	Jakarta		
Kosovo	1:47.4 h	Musa Hajdari	31 August 2014	Sremska Mitrovica		
South Sudan	1:47.41	Abraham Guem	27 July 2024	Tokyo		
Samoa	1:47.45	Aunese Curreen	20 August 2008	Beijing		
Syria	1:47.45	Mahmoud Al-Kheirat	19 June 1998	Esch-sur-Alzette		
Philippines	1:47.52 (Note: Filipino-American runner Carter Lilly has a personal best time of 1:46.95 set on 22 June 2018, just before he became a dual citizen)	Carter Lilly	19 April 2019	Los Angeles		
Angola	1:47.54	João N'Tyamba	27 June 1992	Belle Vue Maurel		
Grenada	1:47.57	D'Angelo Brown	8 May 2026	Bloomington		
Monaco	1:47.61; 1:47.03 (Note: In 2008, Etès switched nationality from France to his birthplace of Monaco in 2008, but apparently after 29 July as his personal best set that date is not listed as a Monégasque national record.)	Brice Etès	22 July 2010; 29 July 2008	Monaco; Monaco		
Turkmenistan	1:47.66	Sergey Kamayev	17 September 1986	Tashkent		
Oman	1:47.68	Husain Mohsin Al Farsi	2 October 2023	Hangzhou		
Yemen	1:47.75	Abdullah Al-Yaari	25 May 2024	Leiden		
Saint Lucia	1:47.83	Marbeq Edgar	5 May 2017	Houston		
Myanmar	1:47.9 h	Jimmy Crampton	11 December 1970	Bangkok		
Costa Rica	1:48.06	Juan Diego Castro	15 May 2021	Manhattan		
Libya	1:48.08	Aboubaker El-Gatrouni	13 October 2003	Abuja		
Pakistan	1:48.10	Muhammad Siddique	28 July 1974	Hanover		
Bolivia	1:48.16	Fadrique Iglesias	27 May 2006	Ponce		
Thailand	1:48.18	Joshua Atkinson	2 October 2023	Hangzhou		
Mauritius	1:48.24	Désiré Pierre-Louis	1 May 1994	Gainesville, Florida		
Jordan	1:48.25	Jihad Al-Balawi	15 July 1993	Buffalo		
Central African Republic	1:48.26	Francky Mbotto	31 July 2021	Tokyo		
Papua New Guinea	1:48.29	Clement Abai	20 April 2002	Baton Rouge		
Gabon	1:48.45	Franck Matamba	3 June 1994	Caluire		
Chad	1:48.6 h	Ahmed Issa	26 August 1962	Thonon-les-Bains		
Cameroon	1:48.6 h	Paulin Nyatchou	9 June 2001	Yaoundé		
Antigua and Barbuda	1:48.62	Dale Jones	25 August 1991	Tokyo		
Fiji	1:48.70	Isireli Naikelekelevesi	8 August 2004	Szombathely		
Iceland	1:48.83	Erlingur Jóhannsson	4 July 1987	Oslo		
United Arab Emirates	1:48.86	Saud Abdul Karim	20 September 2010	Aleppo		
Vietnam	1:48.97	Dương Văn Thái	23 August 2017	Kuala Lumpur		
Togo	1:48.99	Makman Yoagbati	22 June 2024	Douala		
Guatemala	1:49.07	Luis Martínez	25 August 1991	Tokyo		
Nicaragua	1:49.10	Edgard Cortez	27 August 2011	Daegu		
U.S. Virgin Islands	1:49.15	Seymour Walter	June 9, 2012	Indianapolis		
Uruguay	1:49.16	Javier Marmo	14 June 2015	Lima		
North Korea	1:49.2 h	Huang Myon-Son	11 April 1983	Pyongyang		
Bahamas	1:49.29	Joel Forbes	11 May 2024	Marion		
Rwanda	1:49.35	Alexis Sharangabo	26 May 1999	Nassau		
Malawi	1:49.48 A	Kenneth Dzekedzeke	8 August 1987	Nairobi		
Congo Republic	1:49.5 h	Ghislain Obounghat	1 May 1983	Tunis		
Honduras	1:49.50; 1:44.49 (Note: Not a Honduran record as Canales represented Spain from 22 June 2021. However, World Athletics still tags his 2023 short track 800 m record with "NR")	Elvin Canales	16 June 2021; 23 June 2024	Guadalajara; Guadalajara		
Nepal	1:49.55	Som Bahadur Kumal	22 August 2026	Bhubaneswar		
Georgia	1:49.6 h	Anatoliy Nekrasov	14 July 1979	Tbilisi		
New Caledonia	1:49.8 h	Adrien Kela	26 February 2011	Nouméa		
Armenia	1:49.91; 1:47.58 IRM	Yervand Mkrtchyan; Tigran Mkrtchyan	7 August 2024; 23 June 2016	Paris; Artashat		
Indonesia	1:49.93	Alexander Resmol	12 December 1995	Chiang Mai		
Cape Verde	1:49.94	Samuel Freire	17 June 2017	Lisbon		
Singapore	1:49.94	Thiruben Thana Rajan	30 May 2025	Gumi		
Saint Kitts and Nevis	1:49.96	Ian Godwin	27 June 1996	Kingston		
Turks and Caicos	1:50.02	Ken Reyes	2 June 2018	Kingston		
Cambodia	1:50.09	Chhun Bunthorn	15 July 2023	Bangkok		
Hong Kong	1:50.12	Khan Mohammad Kamran	30 May 2025	Gumi		
Paraguay	1:50.17	Francisco Figueredo	13 August 1987	Indianapolis		
Cayman Islands	1:50.22	Jon Rankin	8 April 2011	Westwood		
Lebanon	1:50.31	Mohamed Hannouf	24 June 2023	Marrakesh		
Congo DR	1:50.39	Patrick Tambwé	4 July 2001	Saint-Maur-des-Fossés		
Guinea-Bissau	1:50.50	Danilson Riciulli	29 June 2002	Funchal		
Gibraltar	1:50.58	Harvey Dixon	16 July 2014	Watford		
Niger	1:50.8 h	Moussa Daweye	13 July 1983	Saint-Maur-des-Fossés		
Mauritania	1:50.84 (Note: If Ba, who studied in the USA, still represented Mauritania after 2021); 1:51.30	Amadou Ba	26 February 2023; 16 May 2021	Boston; Greensboro		
Lesotho	1:50.85 A	Freddy Lenka	6 March 1982	Welkom		
El Salvador	1:50.85	Pablo Andrés Ibáñez	26 June 2022	San Salvador		
Benin	1:50.89	Akim Balogoun	21 May 1999	Lagos		
Netherlands Antilles	1:51.0 h	Richard Riley	11 August 1973	Papendal		
Vanuatu	1:51.13	Arnold Sorina	8 October 2010	Delhi		
Bangladesh	1:51.16	Mohamed Hossain Milzer	23 September 1988	Seoul		
Seychelles	1:51.2 h	Selwyn Bonne	24 April 1999	Victoria		
Sierra Leone	1:51.23	Prince Amara	9 July 1995	Cwmbran		
Comoros	1:51.44	Attoumane Abdoul-Had	20 May 2012	Aix-les-Bains		
Equatorial Guinea	1:51.54; 1:50.91	Benjamín Enzema	20 June 2017; 2 August 2018	Pontoise; Asaba		
Guinea	1:51.80	Mohamed Malal Sy Savané	1 August 1992	Barcelona		
San Marino	1:51.8 h	Manlio Molinari	25 June 1997	San Marino		
Montenegro	1:52.05	Slaviša Vraneš	16 June 1996	Niš		
Burkina Faso	1:52.1 h	Kondia Ouoba	13 April 1974	Abidjan		
Anguilla	1:52.17	Vernal Gumbs	28 July 1989	San Juan		
Belize	1:52.33	Jonathan Williams	8 March 2008	Walnut		
Mongolia	1:52.6 h 1:52.63	Tumur Ankhbayar; Chuluunbaatar Ariunsaichan	22 June 2005; 7 June 1988	Ulan-Ude; Ostrava		
Solomon Islands	1:52.64	Charlie Oliver	5 October 1982	Brisbane		
Curaçao	1:52.72	Jairo Troeman	10 July 2010	Miramar		
São Tomé and Príncipe	1:52.8 h	António Cadio Paraiso	27 August 1981	Luanda		
Maldives	1:53.08 A	Naseer Ismail	27 September 1999	Kathmandu		
Guam	1:53.26	Anthony Quan	3 April 1999	Seattle		
French Polynesia	1:53.28	Pascal Adams	8 July 1987	Colombes		
Afghanistan	1:53.62	Wais Ibrahim Khairandesh	12 June 2016	Portland		
Montserrat	1:54.92	Henry Sweeney	6 May 1995	Long Beach		
Brunei	1:55.05	Jimmy Anak Ahar	10 September 2002	Kota Kinabalu		
Aruba	1:55.10	Asher Patel	12 April 2026	Ithaca		
Timor-Leste	1:55.24	Manuel Ataide	10 May 2023	Phnom Penh		
Macau	1:55.54	Lou Wai Un	21 September 2021	Xi'an		
Tonga	1:56.8 h	Henele Taliai	26 November 1998	Melbourne		
Laos	1:57.97	Khambieng Khamiar	24 November 1989	Bangkok		
Norfolk Island	1:58.0 h	Jonathan McKee	18 May 1986	Gothenburg		
Palau	1:59.16	Douglas Schmidt	23 September 2009	Nikao		
Kiribati	2:01.73	Taanini Teekea	3 September 2007	Apia		
Micronesia	2:01.95	Cornelius Ardos	25 July 2002	Kolonia, Pohnpei		
Bhutan	2:03.08 A	Tshering Penjor	8 July 2018	Tokyo		
Marshall Islands	2:05.2 h	Martin Motu'ahala	28 July 1994	Majuro		
Northern Mariana Islands	2:06.7 h	Michael Mancao	17 May 2012	Susupe		
Niue	2:09.91	John Malcolm	8 September 1983	Apia		
Nauru	2:09.92	John-Rico Togogae	14 June 2018	Susupe		
Tuvalu	2:12.0	Nelu Auega	July 1971	Meneñ		

=== Women ===
Country	Time	Athlete	Date	Place	Ref.
Czech Republic	1:53.28	Jarmila Kratochvílová	26 July 1983	Munich	
Ukraine	1:53.43	Nadezhda Olizarenko	27 July 1980	Moscow	
Switzerland	1:53.70	Audrey Werro	27 August 2026	Zurich	
Kenya	1:54.01	Pamela Jelimo	29 August 2008	Zurich	
South Africa	1:54.25	Caster Semenya	30 June 2018	Paris	
Great Britain	1:54.33	Keely Hodgkinson	7 June 2026	Stockholm	
Cuba	1:54.44	Ana Fidelia Quirot	9 September 1989	Barcelona	
Netherlands	1:54.71	Femke Broeders-Bol	27 August 2026	Zurich	
Russia	1:54.81	Olga Mineyeva	27 July 1980	Moscow	
United States	1:54.97	Athing Mu	17 September 2023	Eugene	
Romania	1:55.05	Doina Melinte	1 August 1982	Bucharest	
Mozambique	1:55.19	Maria de Lurdes Mutola	17 August 1994	Zürich	
Slovenia	1:55.19	Jolanda Čeplak	20 July 2002	Heusden-Zolder	
Germany	1:55.26	Sigrun Wodars	31 August 1987	Rome	
Bulgaria	1:55.42	Nikolina Shtereva	26 July 1976	Montreal	
Burundi	1:55.47	Francine Niyonsaba	21 July 2017	Monaco	
China	1:55.54	Dong Liu	9 September 1993	Beijing	
France	1:55.65	Anaïs Bourgoin	28 June 2026	Paris	
Austria	1:55.85	Stephanie Graf	3 March 2002	Vienna	
Jamaica	1:55.96	Natoya Goule-Toppin	17 September 2023	Eugene	
Kazakhstan	1:56.0 h	Valentina Gerasimova	12 June 1976	Kyiv	
Belarus	1:56.1 h 1:56.24	Ravilya Agletdinova	21 August 1982; 1 August 1985	Podolsk; Saint Petersburg	
Uzbekistan	1:56.21	Zamira Zaytseva	27 July 1983	Leningrad	
Morocco	1:56.43	Hasna Benhassi	23 August 2004	Athens	
Croatia	1:56.51	Slobodanka Čolović	17 June 1987	Belgrade	
Ethiopia	1:56.67	Werkuha Getachew	8 June 2021	Hengelo	
Suriname	1:56.68	Letitia Vriesde	13 August 1995	Gothenburg	
Lithuania	1:56.7 h	Dalia Matusevičienė	25 June 1988	Kyiv	
Botswana	1:56.76	Oratile Nowe	16 August 2025	Chorzów	
Gambia	1:56.85	Sanu Jallow-Lockhart	13 June 2026	Eugene	
Poland	1:56.95	Jolanta Januchta	11 August 1980	Budapest	
Canada	1:57.01	Melissa Bishop-Nriagu	21 July 2017	Monaco	
Australia	1:57.01	Sarah Billings	28 June 2026	Paris	
Uganda	1:57.26	Halimah Nakaayi	29 July 2024	London	
Spain	1:57.45	Maite Zúñiga	1 June 1988	Seville	
Italy	1:57.56	Coiro	11 August 2026	Birmingham	
Saint Vincent and the Grenadines	1:57.59	Shafiqua Maloney	4 August 2024	Paris-St-Denis	
Bahrain	1:57.80	Maryam Yusuf Jamal	29 August 2008	Zurich	
North Korea	1:58.0 h	Geum-Dan Shin	5 September 1964	Pyongyang	
Norway	1:58.10	Hedda Hynne	15 September 2020	Bellinzona	
Slovakia	1:58.22	Gabriela Gajanová	4 August 2024	Paris-St-Denis	
New Zealand	1:58.25	Toni Hodgkinson	27 July 1996	Atlanta	
Brazil	1:58.27	Luciana de Paula Mendes	30 July 1994	Hechtel	
Belgium	1:58.31	Sandra Stals	1 August 1998	Hechtel	
Ireland	1:58.51	Ciara Mageean	25 May 2024	Manchester	
Latvia	1:58.64	Marita Ārente	19 July 1984	Moscow	
Benin	1:58.65	Noélie Yarigo	9 June 2023	Paris	
Algeria	1:58.72	Hassiba Boulmerka	17 July 1991	Rome	
Sweden	1:58.77	Lovisa Lindh	6 July 2017	Lausanne	
Kyrgyzstan	1:58.85	Lyudmila Derevyankina	30 July 1988	Kyiv	
Portugal	1:58.94	Carla Sacramento	13 August 1997	Zürich	
Dominica	1:59.06	Dawn Williams-Sewer	27 July 1996	Atlanta	
Namibia	1:59.15	Agnes Samaria	29 July 2002	Manchester	
India	1:59.17	Tintu Luka	4 September 2010	Split	
Greece	1:59.29	Georgia-Maria Despollari	11 August 2026	Birmingham	
Moldova	1:59.3 h	Lyubov Ivanova	12 August 1978	Podolsk	
Colombia	1:59.38	Rosibel García	16 August 2008	Beijing	
Finland	1:59.41	Sara Kuivisto	31 July 2021	Tokyo	
Hungary	1:59.46	Judit Varga	12 June 2003	Ostrava	
Guyana	1:59.47	Marian Burnett	31 May 2004	Palo Alto	
Malta	1:59.56	Tanya Blake	24 May 2003	Eugene	
Tanzania	1:59.58	Lwisa Msyani John	9 September 2000	Yokohama	
Ghana	1:59.60	Akosua Serwah	2 July 2004	Rome	
Grenada	1:59.60	Neisha Bernard-Thomas	1 May 2010	Kingston	
Serbia	1:59.90	Amela Terzić	20 June 2015	Stara Zagora	
Japan	1:59.93	Rin Kubo	15 July 2024	Kashihara	
Turkey	1:59.94	Dilek Koçak	19 June 2024	Nembro	
Iceland	2:00.05	Aníta Hinriksdóttir	15 June 2017	Oslo	
Zambia	2:00.10 A	Felistus Mpande	22 February 2020	Ndola	
Denmark	2:00.10	Annemarie Nissen	8 August 2023	Tampere	
Luxembourg	2:00.13	Charline Mathias	21 July 2018	Lucerne	
Chile	2:00.20	Alejandra Ramos	3 September 1990	Jerez de la Frontera	
Uruguay	2:00.20	Déborah Rodríguez	12 June 2021	Geneva	
Mexico	2:00.31	Valery Tobias	14 April 2023	Azusa	
Rwanda	2:00.32	Claire Uwitonze	2 September 2025	Trier	
Zimbabwe	2:00.49	Julia Sakara	18 September 1998	Kuala Lumpur	
Sri Lanka	2:00.66	Tharushi Karunarathna	16 July 2023	Bangkok	
Tunisia	2:00.70	Abir Nakhli	26 July 2002	Namur	
Vietnam	2:00.91	Truong Thanh Hang	25 November 2010	Guangzhou	
Puerto Rico	2:01.31	Angelita Lind	25 July 1984	Walnut	
Albania	2:01.31	Luiza Gega	21 June 2014	Tbilisi	
Nigeria	2:01.54	Adisa Rhoda	30 May 2026	Lexington	
Panama	2:01.63	Andrea Ferris	12 May 2012	Ponce	
Cyprus	2:01.77	Natalia Evangelidou	12 April 2018	Gold Coast	
Myanmar	2:01.80	Myint Myint Aye	13 February 2005	Yangon	
Trinidad and Tobago	2:01.81	Alena Brooks	12 April 2018	Gold Coast	
Liberia	2:01.89	Fatimoh Muhammed (Note: Nigerian-born Fatimoh Muhammed had changed her nationality to Liberian earlier in 2007.)	9 June 2007	Sacramento	
Estonia	2:02.1 h 2:02.92	Raissa Ruus; Egle Uljas	17 July 1972; 5 July 2005	Moscow; Lausanne	
Barbados	2:02.23	Sade Sealy	7 August 2019	Lima	
Sudan	2:02.42; 2:02.44; 2:02.44	Muna Jabir Adam; Amna Tama; Amna Tama	23 May 2009; 1 June 2016; 25 June 2016	Rabat; Montbéliard; Durban	
Azerbaijan	2:02.50	Anastasiya Komarova	21 June 2015	Baku	
Israel	2:02.59	Shanie Landen	18 June 2024	Oslo	
Argentina	2:02.75	Martina Escudero	22 June 2024	Ordizia	
Liechtenstein	2:02.82	Maria Ritter	27 August 1980	Koblenz	
Ivory Coast	2:02.99	Célestine N'Drin	31 May 1990	Durham	
Bosnia and Herzegovina	2:03.02	Biba Kajan-Subašić	22 June 1985	Zagreb	
Netherlands Antilles	2:03.16	Florencia Hunt	9 June 2001	Nassau	
Thailand	2:03.46	Sasithorn Chantanuhong	26 September 1985	Jakarta	
Papua New Guinea	2:03.53	Salome Dell	10 October 2010	New Delhi	
Dominican Republic	2:03.61	Alexis Panisse	30 May 2014	Jacksonville	
Mauritius	2:03.62; 2:03.79	Sheila Seebaluck	2 July 1988; 23 May 1988	Sarreguemines; Rehlingen	
Cameroon	2:03.90	Stéphanie Nicole Zanga	9 June 2001	Yaoundé	
Bolivia	2:03.98 A	Niusha Mancilla	15 September 2001	Ambato	
Armenia	2:04.0 h	Tsovik Grigorian	15 October 1987	Tbilisi	
Ecuador	2:04.00	Andrea Calderón	23 November 2017	Santa Marta	
Congo Republic	2:04.08	Leontine Tsiba	22 September 2000	Sydney	
South Korea	2:04.12	Huh Yeon-Jung	29 September 2010	Kawasaki	
Madagascar	2:04.22	Martine Rasoarimalala	26 July 1997	Antananarivo	
Haiti	2:04.26	Ginou Etienne	27 May 2006	Greensboro	
Eritrea	2:04.37 (Note: Bereket ran a personal best of 2:00.82 in 2012, but she had switched her nationality to Canadian in 2007.)	Lemlem Bereket	28 June 2006	Montreal	
Bermuda	2:04.40	Tamika Williams	17 April 2004	Palo Alto	
Chinese Taipei	2:04.74	Li Ya-hui	21 July 1998	Fukuoka	
Bahamas	2:04.82	Vernetta Rolle	23 May 1998	Atlanta	
Iraq	2:04.92	Eman Sabeeh Hussain	5 August 1985	Casablanca	
Venezuela	2:04.93; 2:04.5 h#	Yenny Mejias	24 July 2005; 24 July 2004	Cali; San Felipe	
Djibouti	2:05.12	Souhra Ali Mohamed	26 August 2019	Rabat	
Belize	2:05.33	Sharette Garcia	25 April 1992	Irvine	
Mali	2:05.38	Matata Sanogo	8 July 2006	Paris	
Peru	2:05.57	Anita Poma	5 July 2022	Valledupar	
Cape Verde	2:05.76	Carla Mendes	17 July 2019	Barcelona	
Georgia	2:05.8 h	Elena Shapovalova	12 May 1983	Tbilisi	
Costa Rica	2:05.98	Maureen Stewart	5 June 1988	San Juan	
Indonesia	2:06.11	Esther Sumah	16 June 1993	Singapore	
Congo DR	2:06.17	Noelly Mankatu Bibiche	23 July 2004	Paris	
U.S. Virgin Islands	2:06.18	Michelle Smith	1 April 2024	St. George's	
Philippines	2:06.24	Naomi Marjorie Cesar	20 June 2026	Portland	
Saint Lucia	2:06.30	Augustina Charles	26 June 1999	Bridgetown	
Antigua and Barbuda	2:06.36	Charmaine Thomas	13 May 1995	Bloomington	
Paraguay	2:06.38	María Caballero	28 November 2013	Trujillo	
Angola	2:06.53	Lilian Silva	15 June 2006	Luso	
San Marino	2:06.54	Elisa Vagnini	5 June 1998	Milan	
British Virgin Islands	2:06.64	Samantha John	2 August 2009	Port of Spain	
United Arab Emirates	2:06.81	Betlhem Desalegn	5 August 2013	Sollentuna	
Senegal	2:06.82	Fatoumata Diop	3 May 1978	Liège	
Turkmenistan	2:06.84	Svetlana Sots	7 September 1984	Donetsk	
Nicaragua	2:07.10	Xiomara Larios	6 June 1980	Santiago de Cuba	
Togo	2:07.29	Sandrine Thiébaud-Kangni	20 July 2006	Tomblaine	
Iran	2:07.29	Toktam Dastarbandan	6 September 2024	Tehran	
Singapore	2:07.4 h	Chee Swee Lee	31 May 1976	San Diego	
Malaysia	2:07.44	Josephine Mary Singarayar	30 September 1986	Seoul	
Sierra Leone	2:07.53	Agness Mansaray	27 July 1994	Shippensburg	
Kosovo	2:07.67	Gresa Bakraçi	21 June 2023	Chorzów	
Egypt	2:07.7 h	Wala Mohamed Ahmed	6 April 2007	Maadi	
El Salvador	2:07.87	Gladys Landaverde	15 June 2012	Managua	
Pakistan	2:08.04	Bushra Parveen	26 August 2006	Colombo	
Chad	2:08.04	Fraida Hassanatte	17 June 2025	San Vendemiano	
Libya	2:08.12	Najla Aqdeir Ali Salem	8 May 2016	Pavia	
Guatemala	2:08.7 h	Ana Lucia Hurtado	17 May 2001	San Salvador	
Fiji	2:08.81	Makelesi Batimala	30 May 2008	Brisbane	
Timor-Leste	2:08.88	Angela Freitas	21 April 2019	Doha	
Kuwait	2:08.91	Danah Al-Nasrallah	21 May 2016	Windsor	
Malawi	2:09.16	Gertrude Banda	14 October 2003	Abuja	
São Tomé and Príncipe	2:09.38	Euridice Borges Semedo	1 July 2000	Algiers	
North Macedonia	2:09.6 h	Elizabeta Bozinovska	19 May 1981	Skopje	
Jordan	2:10.01	Tamara Armoush	23 July 2016	Oxford	
Syria	2:10.3 h	Hala El-Moughrabi	25 June 1987	Damascus	
Montenegro	2:10.34	Slađana Perunović	11 July 2012	Berane	
Cayman Islands	2:10.4 h 2:10.74	Tiffany Cole; Jaden Francis	17 February 2018; 6 April 2024	George Town; Tuscaloosa	
Mongolia	2:10.5 h	Chuluunkhuu Shinetsetseg	4 July 2009	Ulan Ude	
Comoros	2:10.53	Salhate Djamaldine	14 May 2006	Montgeron	
Nepal	2:11.05	Raj Kumari Pandey	23 October 1989	Islamabad	
Eswatini	2:11.48 A	Bongiwe Mndzebele	8 June 2002	Germiston	
Lebanon	2:11.49	Saria Traboulsi	25 July 2013	Beirut	
Central African Republic	2:11.7 h	Elisabeth Mandaba	17 August 2016	Rio de Janeiro	
South Sudan	2:11.87; 2:08.20 (Note: South Sudan native Perina Lokure Nakang participated at the 2024 Olympics as a member of the IOC Refugee Team.)	Rose Lokonyen; Perina Lokure Nakang	30 July 2021; 2 August 2024	Tokyo; Paris-St-Denis	
Gabon	2:11.89	Marlyse Nsourou	26 June 2007	Celle Ligure	
Hong Kong	2:11.92	Yin Yee Li	3 November 1996	Hong Kong	
Palestine	2:12.21	Layla Almasri	2 August 2024	Paris-St-Denis	
Niger	2:12.8 h	Ramatoulaye Moumouni	11 July 1980	Grasse	
Saint Kitts and Nevis	2:12.9 h	Rosalie Pringle	22 June 2013	Vieux Fort	
Andorra	2:13.04	Natalia Gallego	11 August 2007	Castres	
Laos	2:13.16	Lodkeo Inthakoumman	17 January 2019	Ubon Ratchathani	
Bangladesh	2:13.3 h	Sharmila Ray Chakma	22 December 1985	Dhaka	
Burkina Faso	2:13.30	Honorine Yaméogo	20 July 2003	Ouagadougou	
Seychelles	2:13.50	Nathasha Bibi	12 August 2011	Victoria	
French Polynesia	2:13.62	Marie-Line Marraud	5 May 1988	Pirae	
Vanuatu	2:13.69	Mary-Estelle Kapalu	22 August 1995	Pirae	
Maldives	2:13.81	Fasuhaa Ahmed	14 July 2024	Diyagama	
Guinea-Bissau	2:13.82	Anhel Alberta Cape	6 August 2000	Maia	
Marshall Islands	2:13.83	Haley Nemra	23 May 2008	Pasco	
Tonga	2:14.07	Vasa Tulahe	22 August 1995	Pirae	
Guinea	2:14.97	Aïssata Bangoura	27 December 2002	Casablanca	
Turks and Caicos	2:15.27	Rebecca Bernadin	6 May 2022	Prairie View	
Tajikistan	2:15.41	Kristina Pronzhenko	5 June 2022	Tashkent	
Gibraltar	2:15.56	Kim Baglietto	3 July 2009	Mariehamn	
Equatorial Guinea	2:15.72	Emilia Mikue Ondo	25 August 2007	Osaka	
Palau	2:16.57	Christina Wicker	31 March 1994	Tacoma	
Cook Islands	2:17.06	Attina Sawtell	3 August 1985	Avarua	
Samoa	2:17.60	Kim Peterson	1 April 1984	Christchurch	
Anguilla	2:19.72	Jonicia Richardson	21 April 2014	Fort-de-France	
Macau	2:19.82	Leong Ka Man	15 September 2012	Tianjin	
Solomon Islands	2:19.94	Dorothy Daonanita	24 February 1994	Auckland	
Aruba	2:21.54	Vera-Elise Bakmeyer	7 May 2022	Rosario	
Somalia	2:22.1 h	Qaali Haagi Aden	6 September 1979	Mogadishu	
Honduras	2:22.4 h	Olga Zepeda	22 July 1989	San José	
Cambodia	2:23.16	Sem Sophalnara	7 June 1987	Moscow	
Monaco	2:23.17	Marie-Cécile Rivetta	18 May 1989	Nicosia	
Saudi Arabia	2:25.10	Fatamah Aamir	2 May 2026	Al-Baha	
Brunei	2:26.12	Shana Marie Mobo Holmes	25 November 2015	Bandar Seri Begawan	
Mauritania	2:27.97	Aicha Fall	8 August 2012	London	
Montserrat	2:31.5 h	Estelle Furlonge	5 July 1992	Road Town	
Qatar	2:32.45; 2:31.67 i	Nada Nabil Abdullah; Maroua Mustafa	1 July 2009; 26 February 2010	Singapore; Doha	
Micronesia	2:34.64	Adriana Jack	4 August 1975	Tumon	
Yemen	2:36.28	Sally Ahmad Hanif	23 August 2014	Aleppo	
Bhutan	2:37.40	Chimi Wangmo	6 May 2018	Colombo	
Afghanistan	2:38.28	Mehrangiz Bijanpoor	19 August 2007	Oslo	
Kiribati	2:38.3 h	Ruute Keakea	9 July 1999	Tarawa	
American Samoa	2:39.11	Paula Stevenson	10 December 1987	Noumea	
Oman	2:39.51	Samira al-Harrasi	6 May 2010	Cairo	
Nauru	2:47.3 h	Damaris Porte	15 May 2007	Aiwo	

== Indoor ==
=== Men ===
Country	Time	Athlete	Date	Place	Ref.
Denmark	1:42.67	Wilson Kipketer	9 March 1997	Paris	
Great Britain	1:43.63	Elliot Giles	17 February 2021	Toruń	
Belgium	1:43.83	Eliott Crestan	3 February 2026	Ostrava	
United States	1:43.90	Josh Hoey	8 February 2025	New York City	
Kenya	1:43.98	Michael Saruni	9 February 2019	New York City	
Russia	1:44.15	Yuriy Borzakovskiy	27 January 2001	Karlsruhe	
Poland	1:44.48	Mohamed Attaoui	21 March 2026	Toruń	
Ethiopia	1:44.52	Mohammed Aman	15 February 2014	Birmingham	
Spain	1:44.65	Josué Canales	19 January 2025	Luxembourg City	
Algeria	1:44.67	Mohamed Ali Gouaned	8 February 2026	Metz	
Netherlands	1:44.72	Ryan Clarke	24 January 2026	Boston	
Saint Vincent and the Grenadines	1:44.73	Handal Roban	14 February 2026	Winston-Salem	
Sudan	1:44.75	Ismail Ahmed Ismail	26 February 2009	Prague	
Jamaica	1:44.75	Navasky Anderson	22 February 2026	Toruń	
France	1:44.82	Mehdi Baala	18 February 2003	Stockholm	
Germany	1:44.88	Nico Motchebon	5 February 1995	Stuttgart	
South Africa	1:44.91	Mbulaeni Mulaudzi	9 March 2008	Valencia	
Switzerland	1:44.93	André Bucher	3 March 2002	Vienna	
Italy	1:45.00	Catalin Tecuceanu	23 February 2024	Madrid	
Sweden	1:45.09	Andreas Kramer	17 February 2021	Toruń	
Australia	1:45.14	Peter Bol	22 March 2026	Toruń	
Ireland	1:45.15	Mark English	8 February 2025	New York City	
Japan	1:45.17	Allon Clay	30 January 2026	State College	
Bahrain	1:45.26	Yusuf Saad Kamel	9 March 2008	Valencia	
Morocco	1:45.28	Abdelati El Guesse	9 February 2024	Lyon	
Burundi	1:45.33	Jean-Patrick Nduwimana	10 March 2001	Fayetteville	
Brazil	1:45.43	José Luíz Barbosa	8 March 1989	Piraeus	
Qatar	1:45.48	Musaeb Abdulrahman Balla	19 February 2015	Stockholm	
Canada	1:45.50	Marco Arop	27 January 2024	Fayetteville	
Botswana	1:45.56	Tshepiso Masalela	3 February 2024	Metz	
Latvia	1:45.72	Dmitrijs Miļkevičs	9 March 2008	Valencia	
Ghana	1:45.82	Alex Amankwah	8 February 2025	New York City	
Belarus	1:45.9 h 1:46.22	Andrey Sudnik; Anatoliy Makarevich	17 February 1991; 2 February 1992	Stuttgart	
Bosnia and Herzegovina	1:45.95	Amel Tuka	24 February 2021	Madrid	
Czech Republic	1:46.09	Jakub Holuša	31 January 2010	Karlsruhe	
Uganda	1:46.10	Mike Okot	12 February 1989	Stuttgart	
Puerto Rico	1:46.20	Andrés Arroyo	27 February 2016	Fayetteville	
Hungary	1:46.20	Balázs Vindics	23 February 2020	Budapest	
Tunisia	1:46.23	Hassan Abidi	18 July 2026	Philadelphia	
Norway	1:46.28	Vebjørn Rodal	23 February 1997	Birmingham	
Cuba	1:46.32	Norberto Téllez	19 February 1999	Ghent	
Guyana	1:46.35	Quamel Prince	5 March 2022	Chicago	
Croatia	1:46.40	Predrag Melnjak	10 February 1988	Turin	
Portugal	1:46.40	Rui Silva	19 February 1999	Ghent	
Serbia	1:46.44	Slobodan Popović	10 February 1988	Turin	
New Zealand	1:46.44	James Harding	20 February 2026	Fayetteville	
Ukraine	1:46.49	Ivan Heshko	20 February 2005	Paiania	
Nigeria	1:46.63	Edose Ibadin	29 June 2021	Chicago	
China	1:46.63	Dezhu Liu	12 March 2024	Jinan	
Austria	1:46.65	Andreas Rapatz	11 February 2012	Vienna	
Estonia	1:46.71	Uku Renek Kronbergs	20 March 2026	Toruń	
Dominican Republic	1:46.74	Luis Peralta	11 February 2024	New York City	
Haiti	1:46.75	Cebastian Gentil	11 February 2023	Fayetteville	
Chile	1:46.76	Tomás Squella	1 March 2013	Fayetteville	
Kuwait	1:46.80	Ebrahim Alzofairi	19 February 2024	Tehran	
Barbados	1:46.93	Jonathan Jones	12 February 2022	Clemson	
Trinidad and Tobago	1:46.95	Nathan Cumberbatch	20 March 2026	Toruń	
Liberia	1:46.96	Bobby True	6 March 1999	Indianapolis	
Slovenia	1:46.96	Žan Rudolf	31 January 2013	Linz	
Djibouti	1:46.97+	Ayanleh Souleiman	17 February 2016	Stockholm	
Iran	1:47.04	Sobhan Ahmadi	19 February 2024	Tehran	
Slovakia	1:47.06	Jozef Repčík	16 February 2008	Birmingham	
Mexico	1:47.19	Jesús Tonatiú López	25 February 2023	New York City	
Romania	1:47.21	Petru Drăgoescu	2 March 1985	Piraeus	
Eritrea	1:47.21	Yared Kidane	21 February 2025	Fayetteville	
Finland	1:47.36	Markku Taskinen	12 March 1978	Milan	
Liechtenstein	1:47.41	Günther Hasler	24 February 1977	Milan	
Luxembourg	1:47.44	David Fiegen	3 March 2002	Vienna	
Yugoslavia	1:47.50	Milovan Savić	24 February 1977	Milan	
Kyrgyzstan	1:47.56	Boris Kaveshnikov	29 January 2000	Karlsruhe	
Egypt	1:47.65	Hamada Mohamed	2 March 2018	Birmingham	
Turkey	1:47.70	Salih Teksöz	18 February 2024	Istanbul	
Zambia	1:47.73	Prince Mumba	2 March 2007	Fayetteville	
Bulgaria	1:47.78	Binko Kolev	25 February 1979	Vienna	
Zimbabwe	1:47.78	Savieri Ngidhi	11 March 1995	Indianapolis	
Israel	1:47.81	Dustin Emrani	11 February 2012	Boston	
Colombia	1:47.86	Rafith Rodríguez	14 February 2012	Liévin	
India	1:47.86	Mohammad Afsal	24 March 2026	Bhubaneswar	
Peru	1:47.88	Marco Vilca	28 January 2023	Lubbock	
Uzbekistan	1:47.97	Erkin Isakov	1 February 2001	Tashkent	
Bermuda	1:47.98	Dage Minors	10 February 2018	Boston	
Tanzania	1:48.04	Samwel Mwera	15 February 2005	Stockholm	
South Sudan	1:48.08	Dey Tuach Dey	11 February 2011	Fayetteville	
Greece	1:48.10	Charidimos Xenidakis	10 February 2024	Istanbul	
Azerbaijan	1:48.17	Andrey Vamishin	20 June 1989	Moscow	
Cyprus	1:48.23	Christos Dimitriou	27 January 2018	Vienna	
Somalia	1:48.24	Harun Abda	9 March 2013	Fayetteville	
Costa Rica	1:48.29	Juan Diego Castro	12 February 2021	Lubbock	
Senegal	1:48.33	Babacar Niang	8 March 1987	Indianapolis	
Lithuania	1:48.42	Vitalij Kozlov	3 February 2009	Vienna	
Oman	1:48.47	Husain Mohsin Al Farsi	1 March 2024	Glasgow	
Venezuela	1:48.51	William Wuycke	24 February 1989	Karlsruhe	
Yemen	1:48.52	Abdullah Al-Yaari	1 February 2023	Doha	
Madagascar	1:48.79	Joseph Rakotoarimanana	11 February 1996	Paris	
Andorra	1:48.86	Pol Moya	7 February 2017	Sabadell	
Kazakhstan	1:48.89	Mikhail Kolganov	17 February 2004	Moscow	
Albania	1:48.96	Eraldo Qerama	26 January 2019	Vienna	
Argentina	1:49.00	Luis Antonio Migueles	8 March 1991	Seville	
South Korea	1:49.08	Lee Jin-Il	14 February 1993	Maebashi	
Suriname	1:49.14	Tommy Asinga	11 March 1994	Indianapolis	
Kosovo	1:49.31	Musa Hajdari	16 February 2019	Istanbul	
North Macedonia	1:49.36	Vančo Stojanov	2 February 2003	Sofia	
Ivory Coast	1:49.40	Siahka Bamba	16 February 2001	Liévin	
Iraq	1:49.42	Adnan Al-Mntfage	19 February 2012	Hangzhou	
Sri Lanka	1:49.45	Indunil Herath	20 September 2017	Ashgabat	
Moldova	1:49.6 h 1:49.75	Anatoliy Mamontov; Ion Siuris	10 February 1974; 27 February 2016	Moscow; Istanbul	
Saint Lucia	1:49.70	Michael James	28 February 2016; 6 March 2016	Boston	
Grenada	1:49.72	Nathan Hood	13 May 2021	Birmingham, AL	
Syria	1:50.02	Mahmoud Al-Kheirat	9 February 2002	New York	
Bolivia	1:50.12	Fadrique Iglesias	16 February 2008	Valencia	
Mali	1:50.42	Moussa Camara	30 January 2016	Kirchberg	
Monaco	1:50.57	Brice Etès	19 February 2017	Bordeaux	
Saudi Arabia	1:50.66	Sami Masoud Al-Yami	12 February 2023	Nur-Sultan	
Philippines	1:50.74	Hussein Loraña	6 February 2026	Tianjin	
U.S. Virgin Islands	1:50.87	Osaze Demund	24 February 2024	Albuquerque	
Honduras	1:51.08; 1:46.23	Elvin Canales	7 March 2020; 19 February 2023	Sabadell; Madrid	
Namibia	1:51.27 A	Mao Tjiroze	2 February 2002	Pocatello	
Bahamas	1:51.35	Andre Colebrook	8 March 2014	New York City	
Central African Republic	1:51.36	Francky-Edgard Mbotto	21 January 2024	Rennes	
Nepal	1:51.46	Som Bahadur Kumal	6 February 2026	Tianjin	
United Arab Emirates	1:51.68	Hassan Mayouf	20 September 2017	Ashgabat	
Armenia	1:51.94	Tigran Mkrtchyan	17 February 2017	Istanbul	
Pakistan	1:52.08	Nadar Khan	8 March 1991	Seville	
Uruguay	1:52.49 A	Jairo Moreira	1 March 2026	Cochabamba	
Gibraltar	1:52.59	Harvey Dixon	10 February 2018	Boston	
Seychelles	1:54.14	Gaylord Silly	5 January 2013	Aubière	
Aruba	1:54.31	Asher Patel	31 January 2026	Ithaca	
Antigua and Barbuda	1:54.56	Dale Jones	6 March 1987	Indianapolis	
Angola	1:54.95	Tulio António	24 February 2008	Pombal	
Malaysia	1:55.49	Jayakumar Dewarajoo	11 February 2006	Pattaya	
Thailand	1:56.40	Jakkrit Pattasai	1 November 2009	Hanoi	
Malta	1:56.89	Isaac Bonnici	4 February 2024	Belgrade	
Afghanistan	1:57.36	Wais Ibrahim Khairandesh	18 March 2016	Portland	
Bangladesh	1:59.14	Hassan Kamrul	1 February 2018	Tehran	
Macau	2:00.79	Li Yuxuan	6 February 2026	Tianjin	
Chinese Taipei	2:01.31	Chen Fu-pin	10 February 2006	Pattaya	
British Virgin Islands	2:01.59	Khari Herbert	3 December 2016	Winston-Salem	
Fiji	2:01.75 OT	Abaramo Ratucove	21 February 2026	Pittsburg	

=== Women ===
Country	Time	Athlete	Date	Place	Ref.
Great Britain	1:54.87	Keely Hodgkinson	19 February 2026	Liévin	
Slovenia	1:55.82	Jolanda Čeplak	3 March 2002	Vienna	
Austria	1:55.85	Stephanie Graf	3 March 2002	Vienna	
Germany	1:56.40	Christine Wachtel	13 February 1988	Vienna	
Switzerland	1:56.64	Audrey Werro	22 March 2026	Toruń	
Czech Republic	1:56.90	Ludmila Formanová	7 March 1999	Maebashi	
Mozambique	1:57.06; 1:56.43 # (Note: Disallowed for running inside curb)	Maria de Lurdes Mutola	21 February 1999; 22 February 1998	Liévin; Liévin	
Ukraine	1:57.23	Inna Yevseyeva	1 February 1992	Moscow	
Russia	1:57.47; 1:56.49 # (Note: Annulled by doping violation)	Natalya Tsyganova; Yelena Soboleva	7 March 1999; 9 February 2008	Maebashi; Moscow	
Ethiopia	1:57.52	Gudaf Tsegay	14 February 2021	Val-de-Reuil	
United States	1:58.29	Ajee' Wilson	8 February 2020	New York City	
Burundi	1:58.31	Francine Niyonsaba	4 March 2018	Birmingham	
South Africa	1:58.40	Prudence Sekgodiso	23 March 2025	Nanjing	
Jamaica	1:58.46	Natoya Goule	17 February 2022	Liévin	
Benin	1:58.48	Noélie Yarigo	8 February 2023	Toruń	
Uganda	1:58.58	Halimah Nakaayi	17 February 2022	Liévin	
Saint Vincent and the Grenadines	1:58.69	Shafiqua Maloney	10 February 2024	Fayetteville	
Kenya	1:58.83	Pamela Jelimo	11 March 2012	Istanbul	
Romania	1:59.00	Doina Melinte	8 February 1987	Budapest	
Morocco	1:59.01	Malika Akkaoui	14 February 2012	Liévin	
Netherlands	1:59.07	Femke Bol	8 February 2026	Metz	
Suriname	1:59.21	Letitia Vriesde	23 February 1997	Birmingham	
Uzbekistan	1:59.2 h	Lyubov Kiryukhina-Tsyoma	4 March 1984	Moscow	
Italy	1:59.25	Elisa Cusma	15 February 2009	Karlsruhe	
Poland	1:59.29	Joanna Jóźwik	10 February 2017	Toruń	
Belarus	1:59.31	Natalya Dukhnova	9 March 1997	Paris	
Australia	1:59.46	Catriona Bisset	19 February 2022	Birmingham	
Spain	1:59.52	Mayte Martínez	8 February 2004	Ghent	
Gambia	1:59.76	Sanu Jallow-Lockhart	14 February 2026	Fayetteville	
Portugal	1:59.80	Patricia Silva	23 March 2025	Nanjing	
Croatia	1:59.83	Slobodanka Čolović	8 February 1987	Budapest	
Canada	1:59.87	Jenna Westaway	24 February 2019	Boston	
Namibia	1:59.91	Agnes Samaria	15 February 2005	Stockholm	
Sweden	2:00.01	Maria Akraka	19 February 1998	Stockholm	
Bulgaria	2:00.07	Teodora Kolarova	21 February 2007	Piraeus	
New Zealand	2:00.36	Toni Hodgkinson	9 March 1997	Paris	
France	2:00.42	Elisabeth Grousselle	11 March 2006	Moscow	
Belgium	2:00.46	Sandra Stals	20 February 2000	Birmingham	
Ireland	2:00.58	Síofra Cléirigh Büttner	21 February 2021	Fayetteville	
Algeria	2:00.75	Nouria Mérah-Benida	13 February 1999	Dortmund	
Norway	2:00.77	Pernille Karlsen Antonsen	20 March 2026	Toruń	
Japan	2:00.78	Miho Sugimori	22 February 2003	Yokohama	
Luxembourg	2:00.83	Fanny Arendt	18 January 2026	Kirchberg	
Brazil	2:00.98	Fabiane dos Santos	15 February 2001	Stockholm	
Lithuania	2:01.07	Gabija Galvydytė	24 February 2024	Lubbock	
Latvia	2:01.10	Līga Velvere	12 February 2019	Eaubonne	
Iceland	2:01.18	Aníta Hinriksdóttir	4 February 2017	Reykjavík	
Turkey	2:01.19	Merve Aydin	9 March 2012	Istanbul	
Finland	2:01.57	Eveliina Määttänen	6 February 2024	Toruń	
Slovakia	2:01.70	Gabriela Gajanová	4 March 2023	Istanbul	
Tanzania	2:01.74	Lwisa Msyani John	25 February 2001	Liévin	
Hungary	2:01.80	Judit Varga	5 February 1999	Budapest	
Greece	2:02.08	Eleni Filandra	4 February 2012	Athens	
Kazakhstan	2:02.0 h	Valentina Gerasimova	15 February 1980	Moscow	
Guyana	2:02.27	Marian Burnett	8 March 2008	Valencia	
Albania	2:02.27	Luiza Gega	10 February 2013	Piraeus	
Ghana	2:02.30	Agnes Abu	25 February 2018	Boston	
Denmark	2:02.33	Heidi Jensen	17 February 2000	Stockholm	
Dominica	2:02.55	Dawn Williams-Sewer	8 March 1997	Indianapolis	
China	2:02.90	Qing Liu	1 March 2005	Tianjin	
Serbia	2:03.27	Amela Terzić	5 February 2017	Belgrade	
India	2:03.43	Sinimole Paulose	16 February 2008	Doha	
Bahrain	2:03.64; 2:01.68 (Note: Not a national record; Jepkosgei switched from Kenya to Bahrain on 31 March 2017, but was not eligible to represent Bahrain until 31 August 2021)	Maryam Yusuf Jamal; Nelly Jepkosgei	25 February 2006; 11 February 2018	Magglingen; Metz	
Nigeria	2:03.65	Abike Funmilola Egbeniyi	24 February 2019	Boston	
Vietnam	2:03.65	Truong Thanh Hang	2 November 2009	Hanoi	
Grenada	2:03.93	Neisha Bernard-Thomas	12 March 2005	Fayetteville	
Barbados	2:04.03	Sonia Gaskin	14 February 2020	Boston	
Trinidad and Tobago	2:04.09	Alena Brooks	9 February 2018	Fayetteville	
Moldova	2:04.13	Olga Politova	12 January 1984	Boston	
Cuba	2:04.18	Rose Mary Almanza	9 February 2016	Eaubonne	
Estonia	2:04.39	Egle Uljas	20 February 2007	Võru	
Sri Lanka	2:04.88	Nimali Waliwarsha	21 February 2016	Doha	
Puerto Rico	2:05.06	Aziza Ayoub	3 February 2024	Boston	
Cyprus	2:05.28	Stavri Filippou	10 February 2024	Istanbul	
Tunisia	2:05.32	Abir Nakhli	22 February 2003	Bucharest	
Dominican Republic	2:05.38	Alexis Panisse	1 March 2014	College Station	
Zimbabwe	2:05.56	Privillege Chikara	31 January 2025	Louisville	
Chile	2:06.26	Alejandra Ramos	5 February 1989	Seville	
Bermuda	2:06.29	Tamika Williams	14 February 2004	New York	
Liberia	2:06.41	Fatimoh Muhammed	10 March 2007	Fayetteville	
Mexico	2:06.45	Jeanette Castro	1 February 1997	Reno	
Malta	2:06.53	Gina Mcnamara	3 February 2024	Boston	
Bosnia and Herzegovina	2:06.66	Jelena Gajić	7 February 2021	Belgrade	
Mauritius	2:06.91	Sheila Seebaluck	21 February 1988	Liévin	
Angola	2:07.15	Lilian Silva	26 January 2008	Pombal	
Saint Lucia	2:07.16	Leander Ernest	24 February 2009	Fayetteville	
Argentina	2:07.32	Carmen Arrúa	28 February 1991	Seville	
Israel	2:07.46	Sivan Auerbach	27 January 2024	Fayetteville	
Venezuela	2:07.54	Luisairys Toledo	11 March 2023	Virginia Beach	
Kyrgyzstan	2:07.6 h	Tatyana Borisova	12 October 2001	Rasht	
Congo DR	2:07.62	Noelly Mankatu Bibiche	5 March 2004	Budapest	
Cape Verde	2:07.69	Carla Mendes	23 February 2020	Braga	
Costa Rica	2:07.72	Maureen Stewart	6 March 1987	Indianapolis	
Ivory Coast	2:07.96	Célestine N'Drin	6 March 1987	Indianapolis	
Mali	2:08.14	Matata Sanogo	22 February 2004	Aubiére	
Uruguay	2:08.20 A	María Pia Fernández	28 January 2024	Cochabamba	
Zambia	2:08.24	Addeh Mwamba	12 March 2005	Boston	
Sierra Leone	2:08.31 A	Agnes Mansaray	29 February 2020	Albuquerque	
Madagascar	2:08.42 (Note: Félix's personal best indoor is 2:03.33, but she represented France after 2008 or 2009)	Fanjanteino Félix	7 March 2008	Valencia	
Congo Republic	2:08.97	Léontine Tsiba	10 February 2001	Blacksburg	
Iran	2:09.17	Toktam Dastarbandan	19 February 2024	Tehran	
Bahamas	2:09.34	Vernetta Rolle	24 January 1998	Baton Rouge	
British Virgin Islands	2:09.37	Lakeisha Warner	11 February 2017	Clemson	
Kosovo	2:09.53	Gresa Bakraçi	13 February 2022	Zagreb	
Kuwait	2:09.68	Danah Al-Nasrallah	16 February 2018	Ann Arbor	
Haiti	2:09.68	Victoria Guerrier	9 February 2024	Boston	
Armenia	2:09.70	Lilit Harutyunyan	27 February 2016	Istanbul	
Senegal	2:09.92	Raissa Laval	18 January 2014	Nantes	
Colombia	2:09.95	Norfalia Carabali	4 March 1993	Seville	
Togo	2:09.99	Sandrine Thiébaud-Kangni	2 February 2007	Eaubonne	
Bolivia	2:11.45	Nicole Vaca	6 December 2019	Allendale	
Thailand	2:12.17	Buatip Boonprasert	14 November 2005	Pattaya	
Pakistan	2:12.25	Gulnaz Ara	14 November 2005	Pattaya	
Malaysia	2:12.45	Noraseela Mohd Khalid	23 January 2005	Chemnitz	
U.S. Virgin Islands	2:12.62; 2:12.64	Mikaela Smith; Ninfa Barnard	24 February 2022; 23 February 2014	Birmingham, AL; Birmingham, AL	
Lebanon	2:12.70 A	Rasha Badrani	31 January 2026	Albuquerque	
Belize	2:14.79	Shantel Sabrina Swift	26 February 2015	Birmingham	
Turks and Caicos	2:15.72	Rebecca Bernadin	18 February 2022	Birmingham	
Seychelles	2:21.89	Céline Laporte	5 February 2006	Nogent-sur-Oise	
Macau	2:21.92	Leong Ka Man	19 February 2012	Hangzhou	
Gibraltar	2:22.46	Kim Baglietto	6 February 2013	Birmingham	
Iraq	2:25.90	Alaa Hikmat Al-Qaysi	26 February 2010	Tehran	
Chinese Taipei	2:35.15	Chu Chia-ling	23 March 2018	Beijing	
Bangladesh	2:42.23	Sumi Akther	1 February 2018	Tehran	
Afghanistan	2:47.42	Somayeh Rezaei	14 February 2013	Tehran	
Honduras	3:18.72 (Note: record set during pentathlon competition)	Dennise Reyes	24 February 2019	Birmingham, AL	
