= 1999 World Championships in Athletics – Women's 800 metres =

Women's 800 metres at the 1999 World Championships
- Venue: Estadio Olímpico
- Dates: 21 August (heats); 22 August (semifinals); 24 August (final)
- Competitors: 37 from 31 nations
- Winning time: 1:56.68

Medalists
gold medal	Ludmila Formanová; Czech Republic
silver medal	Maria de Lurdes Mutola; Mozambique
bronze medal	Svetlana Masterkova; Russia

These are the official results of the Women's 800 metres event at the 1999 IAAF World Championships in Seville, Spain. There were a total number of 37 participating athletes, with five qualifying heats, two semi-finals and the final held on Tuesday 24 August 1999 at 21:00h.

Coming into the final turn, converted American sprinter Jearl Miles Clark held a microscopic lead on the inside with 1993 champion Maria Lurdes Mutola virtually even on her shoulder. Double reigning Olympic champion Svetlana Masterkova was chasing on the outside with Ludmila Formanová boxed on the inside behind Clark. Clark kept Mutola on the outside throughout the turn. Coming off the turn, the action began. Clark injected her sprinter's speed, pulling away from Mutola for a few strides. At the same time, Masterkova pulled out to lane 3 to get running room on Mutola. This freed Formanová who went behind Masterkova and out to lane 4 for running room. 50 metres out it was three abreast with Formanová trailing, but Clark couldn't hold the lead and faded. Mutola and Masterkova moved past, but Masterkova couldn't get past Mutola. As Mutola edged into the lead, she looked to be headed for her second championship but Formanová ran around Masterkova and in full sprint, passed Mutola 5 meters out for the win.

== Final ==
RANK	FINAL	TIME
	Ludmila Formanová (CZE)	1:56.68
	Maria Lurdes Mutola (MOZ)	1:56.72
	Svetlana Masterkova (RUS)	1:56.93
4.	Jearl Miles Clark (USA)	1:57.40
5.	Natalya Tsyganova (RUS)	1:57.81
6.	Natalya Gorelova (RUS)	1:57.90
7.	Stephanie Graf (AUT)	1:57.92
8.	Natalya Dukhnova (BLR)	1:58.69

== Semi-final ==
- Held on Sunday 22 August 1999

RANK	HEAT 1	TIME
1.	Maria Lurdes Mutola (MOZ)	1:59.84
2.	Jearl Miles Clark (USA)	2:00.37
3.	Natalya Tsyganova (RUS)	2:00.67
4.	Kelly Holmes (GBR)	2:00.77
5.	Linda Kisabaka (GER)	2:00.81
6.	Lwiza Msyani John (TAN)	2:01.92
7.	Yelena Martson-Buzhenko (UKR)	2:02.01
8.	Sandra Stals (BEL)	2:09.22

RANK	HEAT 2	TIME
1.	Svetlana Masterkova (RUS)	1:59.25
2.	Ludmila Formanová (CZE)	1:59.42
3.	Stephanie Graf (AUT)	1:59.61
4.	Natalya Dukhnova (BLR)	2:00.03
5.	Natalya Gorelova (RUS)	2:00.14
6.	Letitia Vriesde (SUR)	2:00.33
7.	Claudia Gesell (GER)	2:01.24
8.	Brigita Langerholc (SLO)	2:04.51

== Heats ==
- Held on Saturday 21 August 1999

RANK	HEAT 1	TIME
1.	Jearl Miles Clark (USA)	2:00.32
2.	Claudia Gesell (GER)	2:00.32
3.	Letitia Vriesde (SUR)	2:00.46
4.	Diane Modahl (GBR)	2:00.83
5.	Judit Varga (HUN)	2:01.72
6.	Toni Hodgkinson (NZL)	2:02.18
7.	Tytti Reho (FIN)	2:03.72

RANK	HEAT 2	TIME
1.	Stephanie Graf (AUT)	2:00.16
2.	Natalya Tsyganova (RUS)	2:00.32
3.	Meredith Rainey-Valmon (USA)	2:00.86
4.	Patrizia Spuri (ITA)	2:01.00
5.	Irina Nedelenko-Lishchinskaya (UKR)	2:01.53
6.	Tamsyn Lewis (AUS)	2:03.03
7.	Leontine Tsiba (CGO)	2:04.19
8.	Alberta Cape (GBS)	2:19.79

RANK	HEAT 3	TIME
1.	Sandra Stals (BEL)	2:00.07
2.	Maria Lurdes Mutola (MOZ)	2:00.10
3.	Natalya Gorelova (RUS)	2:00.13
4.	Natalya Dukhnova (BLR)	2:00.42
5.	Grace Birungi (UGA)	2:02.71
6.	Julia Sakara (ZIM)	2:03.52
	Kutre Dulecha (ETH)	DNS

RANK	HEAT 4	TIME
1.	Ludmila Formanová (CZE)	1:59.52
2.	Kelly Holmes (GBR)	1:59.72
3.	Lwiza Msyani John (TAN)	2:00.49
4.	Brigita Langerholc (SLO)	2:00.50
5.	Zulia Calatayud (CUB)	2:00.93
6.	Heidi Jensen (DEN)	2:01.12
7.	Vicky Lynch-Pounds (CAN)	2:02.66
8.	Addeh Mwamba (ZAM)	2:07.96

RANK	HEAT 5	TIME
1.	Svetlana Masterkova (RUS)	2:00.27
2.	Yelena Martson-Buzhenko (UKR)	2:00.33
3.	Linda Kisabaka (GER)	2:00.46
4.	Anita Brägger (SUI)	2:01.89
5.	Adoración García (ESP)	2:04.68
6.	Charmaine Howell (JAM)	2:04.73
7.	Tsvetelina Kirilova (BUL)	2:07.41
