= 1997 World Championships in Athletics – Women's 800 metres =

These are the results of the Women's 800 metres event at the 1997 World Championships in Athletics in Athens, Greece. The event took place on the 6th, 7th and 9th of August.

== Doping disqualification ==
Lyubov Tsyoma tested positive for the anabolic steroid stanozolol after the semifinals and was disqualified.

== Medalists ==
Gold	Ana Fidelia Quirot; Cuba (CUB)
Silver	Yelena Afanasyeva; Russia (RUS)
Bronze	Maria Mutola; Mozambique (MOZ)

== Results ==
=== Heats ===
First 2 of each Heat (Q) and the next 6 fastest (q) qualified for the semifinals.

Rank	Heat	Name	Nationality	Time	Notes
1	5	Yelena Afanasyeva	Russia	2:00.12	Q
2	4	Maria Mutola	Mozambique	2:00.88	Q
3	5	Luciana Mendes	Brazil	2:00.89	Q
4	3	Letitia Vriesde	Suriname	2:00.92	Q
5	3	Stella Jongmans	Netherlands	2:01.06	Q
6	4	Joetta Clark	United States	2:01.15	Q
7	1	Ludmila Formanová	Czech Republic	2:01.46	Q
8	4	Petya Strashilova	Bulgaria	2:01.49	q
9	4	Nouria Mérah-Benida	Algeria	2:01.49	q
10	2	Ana Fidelia Quirot	Cuba	2:01.56	Q
10	5	Hasna Benhassi	Morocco	2:01.56	q
12	5	Małgorzata Rydz	Poland	2:01.68	q
13	3	Lyubov Kiryukhina-Tsyoma	Russia	2:01.87	q
14	2	Yelena Martson-Buzhenko	Ukraine	2:02.00	Q
15	2	Toni Hodgkinson	New Zealand	2:02.21	q
16	2	Rosa Kutty	India	2:02.22	
17	1	Natalya Dukhnova	Belarus	2:02.39	Q
18	4	Stephanie Graf	Austria	2:02.52	
19	4	Charmaine Crooks	Canada	2:02.84	
20	1	Linda Kisabaka	Germany	2:03.22	
21	3	Kathy Harris-Rounds	United States	2:03.33	
22	3	Dawn Williams-Sewer	Dominica	2:03.35	
23	1	Julia Sakara	Zimbabwe	2:03.55	
24	5	Irina Nedelenko-Lishchinskaya	Ukraine	2:03.56	
25	5	Monika Ronnholm-Kinnunen	Finland	2:04.11	
26	1	Öznur Dursun	Turkey	2:04.62	
27	2	Jill Stamison-Mcmullen	United States	2:06.16	
28	2	Theoni Kostopoulou	Greece	2:07.32	
29	1	Léontine Tsiba	Republic of the Congo	2:07.34	NR
30	2	Jolanda Čeplak	Slovenia	2:10.97	
31	2	Adama Njie	Gambia	2:13.50	
32	5	Monica Randi	San Marino	2:16.00	
33	1	Abok Shol	Sudan	2:16.74	NR
34	3	Natalia Al Farran	Lebanon	2:18.11	PB
35	3	Donata Mutegwamaso	Rwanda	2:25.07	
36	4	Yaznee Nasheeda	Maldives	2:36.18	
	1	Malin Ewerlöf	Sweden	DNS	
	4	Alberta Cape	Guinea-Bissau	DNS	

=== Semifinals ===
First 4 of each Semifinal qualified directly (Q) for the final.

Rank	Heat	Name	Nationality	Time	Notes
1	1	Maria Mutola	Mozambique	1:57.49	Q, SB
2	1	Yelena Afanasyeva	Russia	1:59.05	Q
3	1	Stella Jongmans	Netherlands	1:59.32	Q, SB
4	1	Joetta Clark	United States	1:59.34	Q
5	2	Ana Fidelia Quirot	Cuba	1:59.37	Q
6	1	Luciana Mendes	Brazil	1:59.45	
7	2	Letitia Vriesde	Suriname	1:59.62	Q
8	2	Ludmila Formanová	Czech Republic	1:59.71	Q
9	2	Toni Hodgkinson	New Zealand	2:00.25	Q
10	2	Natalya Dukhnova	Belarus	2:00.91	
11	2	Nouria Mérah-Benida	Algeria	2:01.08	
12	2	Petya Strashilova	Bulgaria	2:01.44	
13	1	Yelena Martson-Buzhenko	Ukraine	2:02.62	
14	1	Hasna Benhassi	Morocco	2:03.70	
15	1	Małgorzata Rydz	Poland	2:05.00	
	2	Lyubov Kiryukhina-Tsyoma	Russia	DQ (DNF)	Doping

=== Final ===
Rank	Name	Nationality	Time	Notes
1st place, gold medalist(s)	Ana Fidelia Quirot	Cuba	1:57.14	
2nd place, silver medalist(s)	Yelena Afanasyeva	Russia	1:57.56	
3rd place, bronze medalist(s)	Maria Mutola	Mozambique	1:57.59	
4	Letitia Vriesde	Suriname	1:58.12	
5	Ludmila Formanová	Czech Republic	1:59.52	
6	Toni Hodgkinson	New Zealand	2:00.40	
7	Joetta Clark	United States	2:02.05	
8	Stella Jongmans	Netherlands	2:05.50	
