= 1998 European Athletics Championships – Women's 800 metres =

Women's 800 metres at the European Athletics Championships

The women's 800 metres at the 1998 European Athletics Championships was held at the Népstadion on 18, 19 and 20 August.

== Medalists ==
Gold	Yelena Afanasyeva; Russia
Silver	Malin Ewerlöf; Sweden
Bronze	Stephanie Graf; Austria

== Results ==
KEY:	q	Fastest non-qualifiers	Q	Qualified	NR	National record	PB	Personal best	SB	Seasonal best

=== Round 1 ===
Qualification: First 3 in each heat (Q) and the next 4 fastest (q) advance to the Semifinals.

Rank	Heat	Name	Nationality	Time	Notes
1	1	Violeta Szekely	Romania	1:59.98	Q
1	2	Yelena Afanasyeva	Russia	1:59.98	Q
3	1	Malin Ewerlöf	Sweden	2:00.17	Q
4	3	Stephanie Graf	Austria	2:00.25	Q
5	1	Aleksandra Dereń	Poland	2:00.31	Q
6	2	Viviane Dorsile	France	2:00.31	Q
7	2	Natalya Dukhnova	Belarus	2:00.33	Q
8	1	Diane Modahl	Great Britain	2:00.52	q
9	3	Natalya Tsyganova	Russia	2:00.84	Q
10	2	Irina Krakoviak	Lithuania	2:01.04	q
11	3	Ludmila Formanová	Czech Republic	2:01.13	Q
12	3	Maria Akraka	Sweden	2:01.32	q
13	2	Petya Strashilova	Bulgaria	2:01.42	q
14	3	Pilar Barreiro	Spain	2:01.60	
15	2	Ana Menéndez	Spain	2:01.63	
16	4	Larissa Mikhailova	Russia	2:02.03	Q
17	4	Heike Meißner	Germany	2:02.20	Q
18	1	Sandra Stals	Belgium	2:02.34	
19	3	Yelena Buzhenko	Ukraine	2:02.36	
20	4	Tsvetelina Kirilova	Bulgaria	2:02.37	Q
21	4	Anita Brägger	Switzerland	2:02.50	
22	4	Patricia Djaté-Taillard	France	2:02.60	
23	2	Iryna Lishchynska	Ukraine	2:02.78	
24	4	Ella Kovacs	Romania	2:02.85	
25	3	Judit Varga	Hungary	2:03.05	
25	4	Monica Lundgren	Sweden	2:03.05	
27	2	Claudia Gesel	Germany	2:03.20	
28	3	Elena Buhăianu	Romania	2:04.01	
29	1	Brigitte Mühlbacher	Austria	2:04.02	
30	1	Virgie Fouquet	France	2:04.20	
31	1	Nuria Fernández	Spain	2:04.89	
	4	Stella Jongmans	Netherlands	DNS	

=== Semifinals ===
Qualification: First 2 in each heat (Q) and the next 2 fastest (q) advance to the Final.

Rank	Heat	Name	Nationality	Time	Notes
1	2	Yelena Afanasyeva	Russia	1:59.22	Q
2	1	Larissa Mikhailova	Russia	1:59.33	Q
3	2	Malin Ewerlöf	Sweden	1:59.44	Q, NR
4	1	Stephanie Graf	Austria	1:59.50	Q
5	2	Violeta Szekely	Romania	1:59.71	Q
6	1	Tsvetelina Kirilova	Bulgaria	1:59.77	Q, PB
7	2	Heike Meißner	Germany	1:59.92	q
8	1	Natalya Dukhnova	Belarus	1:59.95	q, SB
9	1	Diane Modahl	Great Britain	2:00.08	
10	2	Viviane Dorsile	France	2:00.26	SB
11	1	Ludmila Formanová	Czech Republic	2:00.88	
12	1	Maria Akraka	Sweden	2:01.13	
13	2	Petya Strashilova	Bulgaria	2:01.54	
14	1	Natalya Tsyganova	Russia	2:01.96	
15	2	Aleksandra Dereń	Poland	2:02.22	
16	2	Irina Krakoviak	Lithuania	2:06.29	

=== Final ===
Rank	Name	Nationality	Time	Notes
1st place, gold medalist(s)	Yelena Afanasyeva	Russia	1:58.50	
2nd place, silver medalist(s)	Malin Ewerlöf	Sweden	1:59.61	
3rd place, bronze medalist(s)	Stephanie Graf	Austria	2:00.11	
4	Violeta Szekely	Romania	2:00.56	
5	Tsvetelina Kirilova	Bulgaria	2:00.66	
6	Heike Meißner	Germany	2:01.36	
7	Natalya Dukhnova	Belarus	2:02.14	
8	Larissa Mikhailova	Russia	DNF	
