= 1996 European Athletics Indoor Championships – Women's 800 metres =

The women's 800 metres event at the 1996 European Athletics Indoor Championships was held in Stockholm Globe Arena on 8–10 March.

== Medalists ==
Gold	Silver	Bronze
Patricia Djaté-Taillard; France	Stella Jongmans; Netherlands	Svetlana Masterkova; Russia

== Results ==
=== Heats ===
First 2 from each heat (Q) and the next 2 fastest (q) qualified for the final.

Rank	Heat	Name	Nationality	Time	Notes
1	2	Stella Jongmans	Netherlands	2:03.54	Q
2	2	Ludmila Formanová	Czech Republic	2:03.64	Q
3	1	Patricia Djaté-Taillard	France	2:03.70	Q
4	1	Svetlana Masterkova	Russia	2:03.83	Q
5	2	Ella Kovacs	Romania	2:04.01	q
6	1	Stephanie Graf	Austria	2:04.04	q
7	1	Karen Gydesen	Denmark	2:04.70	
8	2	Ana Menéndez	Spain	2:04.99	
9	1	Carmen Stanciu	Romania	2:05.35	
10	2	Jolanda Čeplak	Slovenia	2:08.84	
	2	Petya Strashilova	Bulgaria	DQ	

=== Final ===
Rank	Name	Nationality	Time	Notes
1st place, gold medalist(s)	Patricia Djaté-Taillard	France	2:01.71	
2nd place, silver medalist(s)	Stella Jongmans	Netherlands	2:01.88	
3rd place, bronze medalist(s)	Svetlana Masterkova	Russia	2:02.86	
4	Ludmila Formanová	Czech Republic	2:03.47	
5	Stephanie Graf	Austria	2:04.76	
6	Ella Kovacs	Romania	2:05.39	
