= 1998 European Athletics Indoor Championships – Women's 800 metres =

The women's 800 metres event at the 1998 European Athletics Indoor Championships was held on 27 February–1 March.

== Medalists ==
Gold	Silver	Bronze
Ludmila Formanová; Czech Republic	Malin Ewerlöf; Sweden	Judit Varga; Hungary

== Results ==
=== Heats ===
First 2 from each heat (Q) and the next 2 fastest (q) qualified for the semifinals.

Rank	Heat	Name	Nationality	Time	Notes
1	3	Ludmila Formanová	Czech Republic	2:02.80	Q
2	3	Malin Ewerlöf	Sweden	2:03.15	Q
3	1	Stella Jongmans	Netherlands	2:03.92	Q
4	1	Sandra Stals	Belgium	2:04.00	Q
5	3	Judit Varga	Hungary	2:04.18	q
6	2	Stephanie Graf	Austria	2:04.24	Q
7	3	Katrien Maenhout	Belgium	2:04.28	q
8	1	Hayley Parry	Great Britain	2:04.37	
9	4	Larisa Mikhaylova	Russia	2:04.49	Q
10	2	Petya Strashilova	Bulgaria	2:04.56	Q
11	3	Nuria Fernández	Spain	2:04.60	
12	4	Eva Kasalová	Czech Republic	2:04.74	Q
13	2	Virginie Fouquet	France	2:04.94	
14	5	Maria Akraka	Sweden	2:05.04	Q
15	4	Ana Menéndez	Spain	2:05.09	
16	4	Monica Lundgren	Sweden	2:05.13	
17	5	Ellen van Langen	Netherlands	2:05.37	Q
18	4	Brigitte Mühlbacher	Austria	2:05.48	
19	1	Pilar Barreiro	Spain	2:05.51	
20	5	Dorota Fiut	Poland	2:05.52	
21	5	Carmen Stanciu	Romania	2:05.58	
22	2	Irina Krakoviak	Lithuania	2:05.78	
23	2	Jolanda Čeplak	Slovenia	2:05.98	
24	1	Aleksandra Dereń	Poland	2:07.37	
25	5	Elisabetta Artuso	Italy	2:07.93	

=== Semifinals ===
First 3 from each semifinal qualified directly (Q) for the final.

Rank	Heat	Name	Nationality	Time	Notes
1	1	Malin Ewerlöf	Sweden	2:01.53	Q
2	1	Ludmila Formanová	Czech Republic	2:01.93	Q
3	1	Stephanie Graf	Austria	2:01.96	Q
4	1	Larisa Mikhaylova	Russia	2:01.99	
5	2	Stella Jongmans	Netherlands	2:03.62	Q
6	2	Judit Varga	Hungary	2:04.15	Q
7	1	Sandra Stals	Belgium	2:04.50	
8	2	Petya Strashilova	Bulgaria	2:04.56	Q
9	2	Eva Kasalová	Czech Republic	2:04.62	
10	2	Katrien Maenhout	Belgium	2:04.83	
	2	Maria Akraka	Sweden	DQ	
	1	Ellen van Langen	Netherlands	DNS	

=== Final ===
Rank	Name	Nationality	Time	Notes
1st place, gold medalist(s)	Ludmila Formanová	Czech Republic	2:02.30	
2nd place, silver medalist(s)	Malin Ewerlöf	Sweden	2:03.61	
3rd place, bronze medalist(s)	Judit Varga	Hungary	2:03.81	
4	Stella Jongmans	Netherlands	2:03.82	
5	Petya Strashilova	Bulgaria	2:05.74	
6	Stephanie Graf	Austria	2:07.99	
