= 2000 European Athletics Indoor Championships – Women's 800 metres =

Athletic event

The women's 800 metres event at the 2000 European Athletics Indoor Championships was held on February 26–27.

== Medalists ==
Gold	Silver	Bronze
Stephanie Graf; Austria	Natalya Tsyganova; Russia	Sandra Stals; Belgium

== Results ==
=== Heats ===
First 2 of each heat (Q) qualified directly for the final.

Rank	Heat	Name	Nationality	Time	Notes
1	3	Stephanie Graf	Austria	2:00.90	Q
2	1	Natalya Tsyganova	Russia	2:01.58	Q
3	3	Jolanda Čeplak	Slovenia	2:02.12	Q, NR
4	1	Ivonne Teichmann	Germany	2:02.23	Q
5	2	Sandra Stals	Belgium	2:03.33	Q
6	2	Stella Jongmans	Netherlands	2:03.58	Q
7	1	Irina Krakoviak	Lithuania	2:03.77	SB
8	2	Alina Ripanu	Romania	2:03.78	SB
9	3	Anca Safta	Romania	2:04.36	
10	3	Virginie Fouquet	France	2:04.37	SB
11	1	Heidi Jensen	Denmark	2:04.54	
12	1	Elisabeth Grouselle	France	2:04.97	
13	1	Patrizia Spuri	Italy	2:05.17	PB
14	2	Aleksandra Dereń	Poland	2:05.45	
15	2	Laetitia Valdonado	France	2:05.47	
16	2	Linda Kisabaka	Germany	2:06.10	
17	3	Simone Beutelspacher	Germany	2:09.42	

=== Final ===
Rank	Name	Nationality	Time	Notes
1st place, gold medalist(s)	Stephanie Graf	Austria	1:59.70	
2nd place, silver medalist(s)	Natalya Tsyganova	Russia	2:00.17	
3rd place, bronze medalist(s)	Sandra Stals	Belgium	2:01.34	
4	Jolanda Čeplak	Slovenia	2:02.10	NR
5	Ivonne Teichmann	Germany	2:02.26	
6	Stella Jongmans	Netherlands	2:03.11	
