= 1999 IAAF World Indoor Championships – Women's 800 metres =

The women's 800 metres event at the 1999 IAAF World Indoor Championships was held on March 5–7.

== Medalists ==
Gold	Silver	Bronze
Ludmila Formanová; Czech Republic	Maria Mutola; Mozambique	Natalya Tsyganova; Russia

== Results ==
=== Heats ===
First 2 of each heat (Q) and next 6 fastest (q) qualified for the semifinals.

Rank	Heat	Name	Nationality	Time	Notes
1	1	Ludmila Formanová	Czech Republic	2:00.49	Q
2	1	Natalya Tsyganova	Russia	2:00.77	Q
3	1	Meredith Valmon	United States	2:01.41	q
4	1	Malin Ewerlöf	Sweden	2:02.23	q, SB
5	1	Letitia Vriesde	Suriname	2:02.51	q
6	2	Maria Mutola	Mozambique	2:02.96	Q
7	2	Hasna Benhassi	Morocco	2:03.09	Q
8	2	Natalya Dukhnova	Belarus	2:03.26	q
9	2	Michelle DiMuro-Ave	United States	2:03.37	q
10	2	Nouria Merah-Benida	Algeria	2:03.43	q
11	3	Stephanie Graf	Austria	2:04.45	Q
12	3	Tamsyn Lewis	Australia	2:04.52	Q
13	3	Natalya Gorelova	Russia	2:04.64	
14	2	Lwiza John	Tanzania	2:05.38	
15	3	Tina Paulino	Mozambique	2:05.66	PB
16	3	Grace Birungi	Uganda	2:06.52	
17	1	Makiko Yoshida	Japan	2:15.65	
	3	Mardrea Hyman	Jamaica	DNF	

=== Semifinals ===
First 2 of each semifinal (Q) and the next 2 fastest (q) qualified for the final.

Rank	Heat	Name	Nationality	Time	Notes
1	1	Ludmila Formanová	Czech Republic	1:59.22	Q
2	1	Natalya Tsyganova	Russia	1:59.96	Q
3	1	Hasna Benhassi	Morocco	2:00.30	q
4	1	Meredith Valmon	United States	2:00.75	q
5	1	Malin Ewerlöf	Sweden	2:01.93	SB
6	2	Maria Mutola	Mozambique	2:02.18	Q
7	1	Tamsyn Lewis	Australia	2:02.42	NR
8	2	Stephanie Graf	Austria	2:02.51	Q
9	2	Natalya Dukhnova	Belarus	2:03.05	
10	2	Nouria Mérah-Benida	Algeria	2:03.10	
11	2	Letitia Vriesde	Suriname	2:03.50	
12	2	Michelle DiMuro-Ave	United States	2:04.77	

=== Final ===
Rank	Name	Nationality	Time	Notes
1st place, gold medalist(s)	Ludmila Formanová	Czech Republic	1:56.90	CR
2nd place, silver medalist(s)	Maria Mutola	Mozambique	1:57.17	
3rd place, bronze medalist(s)	Natalya Tsyganova	Russia	1:57.47	NR
4	Meredith Valmon	United States	1:59.11	PB
5	Hasna Benhassi	Morocco	1:59.57	
6	Stephanie Graf	Austria	2:04.39	
