= 2002 European Athletics Championships – Women's 800 metres =

Women's 800 metres at the European Athletics Championships

The women's 800 metres at the 2002 European Athletics Championships were held at the Olympic Stadium on August 6–8.

== Medalists ==
Gold	Silver	Bronze
Jolanda Čeplak; Slovenia	Mayte Martínez; Spain	Kelly Holmes; Great Britain

== Results ==
=== Heats ===
Qualification: First 3 of each heat (Q) and the next 4 fastest (q) qualified for the semifinals.

Rank	Heat	Name	Nationality	Time	Notes
1	4	Claudia Gesell	Germany	2:01.69	Q
2	4	Jolanda Čeplak	Slovenia	2:01.98	Q
3	4	Tsvetelina Kirilova	Bulgaria	2:02.29	Q
4	4	Natalya Dedkova	Belarus	2:02.31	q
5	2	Svetlana Cherkasova	Russia	2:02.40	Q
6	2	Mayte Martínez	Spain	2:02.59	Q
7	3	Nédia Semedo	Portugal	2:02.80	Q
8	3	Joanne Fenn	Great Britain	2:02.91	Q
9	3	Sandra Stals	Belgium	2:03.13	Q
10	2	Brigita Langerholc	Slovenia	2:03.14	Q
11	4	Aurélie Coulaud	France	2:03.16	q
12	1	Kelly Holmes	Great Britain	2:03.18	Q
13	2	Tanya Blake	Malta	2:03.22	q
14	3	Ivonne Teichmann	Germany	2:03.23	q
15	1	Ludmila Formanová	Czech Republic	2:03.25	Q
16	3	Heidi Jensen	Denmark	2:03.41	
17	4	Helena Fuchsová	Czech Republic	2:03.71	
18	1	Olga Raspopova	Russia	2:03.73	Q
19	2	Virginie Fouquet	France	2:03.75	
20	4	Rikke Ronholt	Denmark	2:03.97	
21	1	Élisabeth Grousselle	France	2:04.07	
22	2	Maria Papadopoulou	Greece	2:04.52	
23	1	Suvi Myllymaki	Finland	2:04.69	
24	3	Adrienne McIvor	Ireland	2:05.01	
25	2	Petra Ptiček	Croatia	2:05.15	PB
26	1	Anni Christofidou	Greece	2:05.82	
27	3	Irina Mistyukevich	Russia	2:07.67	
28	1	Yuliya Gurtovenko	Ukraine	2:08.04	

=== Semifinals ===
Qualification: First 3 of each semifinal (Q) and the next 2 fastest (q) qualified for the final.

Rank	Heat	Name	Nationality	Time	Notes
1	1	Jolanda Čeplak	Slovenia	2:00.37	Q
2	2	Kelly Holmes	Great Britain	2:00.66	Q
3	1	Claudia Gesell	Germany	2:00.67	Q
4	2	Mayte Martínez	Spain	2:00.72	Q
5	1	Nédia Semedo	Portugal	2:00.85	Q
6	2	Ludmila Formanová	Czech Republic	2:01.07	Q
7	2	Ivonne Teichmann	Germany	2:01.15	q
8	2	Natalya Dedkova	Belarus	2:01.20	q
9	1	Svetlana Cherkasova	Russia	2:01.59	
10	2	Brigita Langerholc	Slovenia	2:02.43	
11	1	Sandra Stals	Belgium	2:02.44	
12	2	Olga Raspopova	Russia	2:02.53	
13	1	Joanne Fenn	Great Britain	2:02.99	
14	1	Tsvetelina Kirilova	Bulgaria	2:05.07	
15	1	Tanya Blake	Malta	2:10.33	
	2	Aurélie Coulaud	France	DNF	

=== Final ===
Rank	Name	Nationality	Time	Notes
1st place, gold medalist(s)	Jolanda Čeplak	Slovenia	1:57.65	
2nd place, silver medalist(s)	Mayte Martínez	Spain	1:58.86	PB
3rd place, bronze medalist(s)	Kelly Holmes	Great Britain	1:59.83	SB
4	Ludmila Formanová	Czech Republic	2:00.23	
5	Claudia Gesell	Germany	2:00.51	
6	Nédia Semedo	Portugal	2:00.54	PB
7	Ivonne Teichmann	Germany	2:00.87	
8	Natalya Dedkova	Belarus	2:04.24	
