= 1997 European Athletics U23 Championships – Women's 800 metres =

The women's 800 metres event at the 1997 European Athletics U23 Championships was held in Turku, Finland, on 12 and 13 July 1997.

== Medalists ==
Gold	Irina Nedelenko; Ukraine
Silver	Dorota Fiut; Poland
Bronze	Lyudmila Goncharova; Russia

== Results ==
=== Final ===
13 July

Rank	Name	Nationality	Time	Notes
1st place, gold medalist(s)	Irina Nedelenko	Ukraine	2:01.72	
2nd place, silver medalist(s)	Dorota Fiut	Poland	2:02.44	
3rd place, bronze medalist(s)	Lyudmila Goncharova	Russia	2:02.72	
4	Claudia Gesell	Germany	2:03.76	
5	Virginie Fouquet	France	2:04.39	
6	Judit Varga	Hungary	2:04.78	
7	Claudia Salvarani	Italy	2:05.32	
8	Irina Krakoviak	Lithuania	2:08.15	

=== Heats ===
12 July
Qualified: first 2 in each heat and 2 best to the Final

==== Heat 1 ====
Rank	Name	Nationality	Time	Notes
1	Dorota Fiut	Poland	2:05.31	Q
2	Irina Krakoviak	Lithuania	2:05.47	Q
3	Mioara Cosulianu	Romania	2:05.55	
4	Jeina Mitchell	Great Britain	2:06.04	
5	Jolanda Čeplak	Slovenia	2:06.43	
6	Peggy Müller	Germany	2:08.43	
7	Eva Kasalová	Czech Republic	2:08.44	

==== Heat 2 ====
Rank	Name	Nationality	Time	Notes
1	Lyudmila Goncharova	Russia	2:03.39	Q
2	Claudia Gesell	Germany	2:03.57	Q
3	Claudia Salvarani	Italy	2:03.88	q
4	Virginie Fouquet	France	2:04.07	q
5	Nuria Fernández	Spain	2:06.05	
6	Inna Konovalenko	Belarus	2:08.41	

==== Heat 3 ====
Rank	Name	Nationality	Time	Notes
1	Irina Nedelenko	Ukraine	2:04.46	Q
2	Judit Varga	Hungary	2:04.79	Q
3	Irina Mistyukevich	Russia	2:04.86	
4	Brigitte Mühlbacher	Austria	2:05.09	
5	Lara Zulian	Italy	2:09.64	
	Sandra Stals	Belgium	DNF	

== Participation ==
According to an unofficial count, 19 athletes from 16 countries participated in the event.

- Austria (1)
- Belarus (1)
- Belgium (1)
- Czech Republic (1)
- France (1)
- Germany (2)
- Great Britain (1)
- Hungary (1)
- Italy (2)
- Lithuania (1)
- Poland (1)
- Romania (1)
- Russia (2)
- Slovenia (1)
- Spain (1)
- Ukraine (1)
