= 2006 IAAF World Indoor Championships – Women's 800 metres =

The Women's 800 metres event at the 2006 IAAF World Indoor Championships was held on March 10–12.

== Medalists ==
Gold	Silver	Bronze
Maria Mutola; Mozambique	Kenia Sinclair; Jamaica	Hasna Benhassi; Morocco

== Results ==
=== Heats ===
First 2 of each heat (Q) and the next 2 fastest (q) qualified for the semifinals.

Rank	Heat	Name	Nationality	Time	Notes
1	1	Maria Mutola	Mozambique	2:02.33	Q
2	1	Tetiana Petlyuk	Ukraine	2:02.40	Q
3	1	Jennifer Meadows	Great Britain	2:02.75	q
4	2	Hasna Benhassi	Morocco	2:03.63	Q
5	2	Ewelina Sętowska-Dryk	Poland	2:03.71	Q, SB
6	3	Olga Kotlyarova	Russia	2:03.75	Q
7	3	Kenia Sinclair	Jamaica	2:03.94	Q
8	1	Teodora Kolarova	Bulgaria	2:04.12	q
9	3	Frances Santin	United States	2:04.22	q
10	2	Mihaela Neacsu	Romania	2:04.24	q
11	2	Karen Harewood	Great Britain	2:04.51	
12	4	Élisabeth Grousselle	France	2:04.74	Q
13	4	Natalya Tsyganova	Russia	2:04.82	Q
14	3	Elisa Cusma Piccione	Italy	2:04.95	
15	3	Mina Aït Hammou	Morocco	2:05.11	
16	4	Maria Cioncan	Romania	2:05.17	
17	1	Lwiza Msyani John	Tanzania	2:05.88	SB
18	4	Zoya Nesterenko-Hladun	Ukraine	2:05.90	
19	1	Marian Burnett	Guyana	2:07.18	
20	2	Alexia Oberstolz	Italy	2:07.62	
	4	Alice Schmidt	United States	DQ	

=== Semifinals ===
First 3 of each semifinal qualified directly (Q) for the final.

Rank	Heat	Name	Nationality	Time	Notes
1	2	Kenia Sinclair	Jamaica	2:00.06	Q, NR
2	2	Maria Mutola	Mozambique	2:00.29	Q, SB
3	2	Élisabeth Grousselle	France	2:00.42	Q, NR
4	2	Natalya Tsyganova	Russia	2:00.46	
5	2	Mihaela Neacsu	Romania	2:02.51	
6	1	Hasna Benhassi	Morocco	2:03.59	Q
7	1	Olga Kotlyarova	Russia	2:03.70	Q
8	1	Ewelina Sętowska-Dryk	Poland	2:03.87	Q
9	1	Jennifer Meadows	Great Britain	2:03.95	
10	1	Tetiana Petlyuk	Ukraine	2:04.74	
11	1	Teodora Kolarova	Bulgaria	2:04.88	
12	2	Frances Santin	United States	2:05.40	

=== Final ===
Rank	Name	Nationality	Time	Notes
1st place, gold medalist(s)	Maria Mutola	Mozambique	1:58.90	SB
2nd place, silver medalist(s)	Kenia Sinclair	Jamaica	1:59.54	NR
3rd place, bronze medalist(s)	Hasna Benhassi	Morocco	2:00.34	SB
4	Élisabeth Grousselle	France	2:00.74	
5	Olga Kotlyarova	Russia	2:01.26	
6	Ewelina Sętowska-Dryk	Poland	2:02.39	PB
