= Athletics at the 1996 Summer Olympics – Women's 800 metres =

Women's 800 metres at the Games of the XXVI Olympiad
- Venue: Centennial Olympic Stadium
- Dates: 26 July 1996 (heats); 27 July 1996 (semi-finals); 29 July 1996 (final)
- Competitors: 36 from 31 nations
- Winning time: 1:57.73

Medalists
1st place, gold medalist(s)		Svetlana Masterkova; Russia
2nd place, silver medalist(s)		Ana Fidelia Quirot; Cuba
3rd place, bronze medalist(s)		Maria de Lurdes Mutola; Mozambique

Official Video Highlights @ 1:49:53

These are the official results of the women's 800 metres event at the 1996 Summer Olympics in Atlanta, Georgia, United States. There were a total of 37 competitors from 31 countries.

== Medalists ==
Gold	Svetlana Masterkova; Russia
Silver	Ana Fidelia Quirot; Cuba
Bronze	Maria de Lurdes Mutola; Mozambique

== Records ==
These were the standing world and Olympic records (in minutes) prior to the 1996 Summer Olympics.

World record	1:53.28	(Czechoslovakia) Jarmila Kratochvílová	Munich (FRG)	July 26, 1983
Olympic record	1:53.43	(Soviet Union) Nadiya Olizarenko	Moscow (URS)	July 27, 1980

== Results ==
=== Heats ===
Qualification: First 2 in each heat (Q) and the next 6 fastest (q) qualified to the semifinals.

Rank	Heat	Name	Nationality	Time	Notes
1	5	Kelly Holmes	Great Britain	1:58.80	Q
2	2	Maria de Lurdes Mutola	Mozambique	1:58.98	Q
2	5	Patricia Djaté-Taillard	France	1:58.98	Q
4	2	Yelena Afanasyeva	Russia	1:59.18	Q
5	3	Natasha Dukhnova	Belarus	1:59.23	Q
6	3	Toni Hodgkinson	New Zealand	1:59.35	Q
7	5	Ludmila Formanová	Czech Republic	1:59.37	q
8	2	Linda Kisabaka	Germany	1:59.56	q
8	3	Dawn Williams	Dominica	1:59.56	q
10	1	Svetlana Masterkova	Russia	1:59.67	Q
11	1	Letitia Vriesde	Suriname	1:59.71	Q
12	3	Meredith Rainey	United States	1:59.96	q
13	4	Ana Fidelia Quirot	Cuba	1:59.98	Q
14	2	Viviane Dorsile	France	2:00.02	q
15	3	Lyubov Tsyoma	Russia	2:00.18	q
16	1	Luciana Mendes	Brazil	2:00.25	
17	4	Stella Jongmans	Netherlands	2:00.26	Q
18	3	Charmaine Crooks	Canada	2:00.27	
19	4	Joetta Clark	United States	2:00.38	
20	5	Suzy Favor-Hamilton	United States	2:00.47	
21	5	Inez Turner	Jamaica	2:01.48	
22	4	Malin Ewerlöf	Sweden	2:01.61	
23	4	Petya Strashilova	Bulgaria	2:02.13	
24	1	Nouria Mérah-Benida	Algeria	2:02.44	
25	4	Lisa Lightfoot	Australia	2:02.88	
26	2	Eduarda Coelho	Portugal	2:03.22	
27	1	Jian Zhang	China	2:04.17	
28	5	Kutre Dulecha	Ethiopia	2:04.80	
29	2	Marta Orellana	Argentina	2:04.99	
30	4	Restituta Joseph	Tanzania	2:08.31	
31	1	Léontine Tsiba	Republic of the Congo	2:08.58	
32	1	Sharette García	Belize	2:13.52	
33	3	Yaznee Nasheeda	Maldives	2:36.85	
	2	Diane Modahl	Great Britain	DNF	
	3	Ana Amelia Menéndez	Spain	DNF	
	5	Adama Njie	The Gambia	DNF	
	1	Tina Paulino	Mozambique	DNS	

=== Semifinals ===
Qualification: First 4 in each heat (Q) qualified directly to the final.

Rank	Heat	Name	Nationality	Time	Notes
1	2	Maria de Lurdes Mutola	Mozambique	1:57.62	Q
2	2	Yelena Afanasyeva	Russia	1:57.77	Q
3	2	Patricia Djaté-Taillard	France	1:57.93	Q
4	1	Svetlana Masterkova	Russia	1:57.95	Q
5	1	Ana Fidelia Quirot	Cuba	1:57.99	Q
6	2	Toni Hodgkinson	New Zealand	1:58.25	Q
7	2	Letitia Vriesde	Suriname	1:58.29	
8	1	Kelly Holmes	Great Britain	1:58.49	Q
9	1	Natasha Dukhnova	Belarus	1:58.67	Q
10	1	Dawn Williams	Dominica	1:59.06	
11	1	Linda Kisabaka	Germany	1:59.23	
12	2	Ludmila Formanová	Czech Republic	1:59.28	
13	2	Meredith Rainey	United States	1:59.36	
14	1	Viviane Dorsile	France	2:00.68	
15	2	Lyubov Tsyoma	Russia	2:02.50	
	1	Stella Jongmans	Netherlands	DNF	

=== Final ===
Rank	Name	Nationality	Time	Notes
1st place, gold medalist(s)	Svetlana Masterkova	Russia	1:57.73	
2nd place, silver medalist(s)	Ana Fidelia Quirot	Cuba	1:58.11	
3rd place, bronze medalist(s)	Maria de Lurdes Mutola	Mozambique	1:58.71	
4	Kelly Holmes	Great Britain	1:58.81	
5	Yelena Afanasyeva	Russia	1:59.57	
6	Patricia Djaté-Taillard	France	1:59.61	
7	Natasha Dukhnova	Belarus	2:00.32	
8	Toni Hodgkinson	New Zealand	2:00.54	

== See also ==
- Men's 800 metres
