= 2002 European Athletics Indoor Championships – Women's 800 metres =

The Women's 800 metres event at the 2002 European Athletics Indoor Championships was held on 2–3 March.

== Medalists ==
Gold	Silver	Bronze
Jolanda Čeplak; Slovenia	Stephanie Graf; Austria	Élisabeth Grousselle; France

== Results ==
=== Heats ===
The winner of each heat (Q) and the next 3 fastest (q) qualified for the semi-finals.

Rank	Heat	Name	Nationality	Time	Notes
1	1	Jolanda Čeplak	Slovenia	1:59.60	Q
2	2	Stephanie Graf	Austria	2:01.40	Q
3	1	Svetlana Cherkasova	Russia	2:02.04	q
4	2	Sandra Stals	Belgium	2:02.35	q, SB
5	2	Élisabeth Grousselle	France	2:02.40	q, PB
6	2	Judit Varga	Hungary	2:02.43	SB
7	2	Esther Desviat	Spain	2:02.86	PB
8	1	Peggy Babin	France	2:04.30	
9	3	Mayte Martínez	Spain	2:04.38	Q
10	1	Sandra Teixeira	Portugal	2:04.43	
11	3	Helena Fuchsová	Czech Republic	2:04.74	
12	3	Virginie Fouquet	France	2:05.78	
13	1	Anny Christofidou	Cyprus	2:12.86	
	3	Jennifer Meadows	Great Britain	DNF	

=== Final ===
Rank	Name	Nationality	Time	Notes
1st place, gold medalist(s)	Jolanda Čeplak	Slovenia	1:55.82	WR, CR
2nd place, silver medalist(s)	Stephanie Graf	Austria	1:55.85	NR
3rd place, bronze medalist(s)	Élisabeth Grousselle	France	2:01.46	PB
4	Mayte Martínez	Spain	2:01.50	
5	Svetlana Cherkasova	Russia	2:02.80	
6	Sandra Stals	Belgium	2:07.33	
