= Athletics at the 1995 Summer Universiade – Women's 800 metres =

The women's 800 metres event at the 1995 Summer Universiade was held on 30–31 August at the Hakatanomori Athletic Stadium in Fukuoka, Japan.

== Medalists ==
| Gold | Silver | Bronze |
|---|---|---|
| Stella Jongmans; Netherlands | Svetlana Tverdokhleb; Ukraine | Natalie Tait; Great Britain |

== Results ==
=== Heats ===
Qualification: First 2 of each heat (Q) and the next 6 fastest (q) qualified for the semifinals.

| Rank | Heat | Athlete | Nationality | Time | Notes |
|---|---|---|---|---|---|
| 1 | 4 | Kumiko Okamoto | Japan | 2:04.22 | Q |
| 2 | 4 | Nicole Teter | United States | 2:04.71 | Q |
| 3 | 4 | Alla Krasnoslobodskaya | Russia | 2:04.77 | q |
| 4 | 4 | Svetlana Tverdokhleb | Ukraine | 2:05.32 | q |
| 5 | 2 | Stephanie Graf | Austria | 2:05.54 | Q |
| 6 | 1 | Stella Jongmans | Netherlands | 2:05.60 | Q |
| 7 | 2 | Natalie Tait | Great Britain | 2:05.62 | Q |
| 8 | 4 | Delia Castro | Mexico | 2:05.68 | q |
| 9 | 2 | Yuko Tamate | Japan | 2:06.02 | q |
| 10 | 1 | Jennifer Buckley | United States | 2:06.10 | Q |
| 11 | 2 | Yekaterina Dedkova | Russia | 2:06.31 | q |
| 12 | 1 | Mioara Cosulianu | Romania | 2:06.89 | q |
| 13 | 2 | Ana Amelia Menéndez | Spain | 2:06.90 | |
| 14 | 5 | Ester Goossens | Netherlands | 2:07.23 | Q |
| 15 | 5 | Simona Guarino | Italy | 2:07.25 | Q |
| 16 | 1 | Alcina Reis | Brazil | 2:07.72 | |
| 17 | 5 | Rachael Rowberry | New Zealand | 2:08.37 | |
| 18 | 5 | Julie Cote | Canada | 2:08.51 | |
| 19 | 3 | Lorrie Ann Adams | Guyana | 2:09.11 | Q |
| 20 | 1 | Charmaine Thomas | Antigua and Barbuda | 2:09.15 | |
| 21 | 3 | Jennifer Mawby | Canada | 2:09.16 | Q |
| 22 | 3 | Célia dos Santos | Brazil | 2:09.23 | |
| 23 | 3 | Catalina Gheorghiu | Romania | 2:09.58 | |
| 24 | 3 | Merci Colorado | Ecuador | 2:10.86 | |
| 25 | 5 | Agnes Samaria | Namibia | 2:11.61 | |
| 26 | 4 | Karolina Tonono | Fiji | 2:13.04 | |
| 27 | 2 | Clara Morales | Chile | 2:14.49 | |
| 28 | 3 | Sandra Moya | Puerto Rico | 2:14.97 | |
| 29 | 5 | Cheong Tsui Fong | Singapore | 2:17.49 | |
| 30 | 1 | Patricia Martínez | Peru | 2:20.44 | |
| 31 | 5 | Sandra Stals | Belgium | 2:20.44 | |
| | 1 | Shanti Ramachandran | Malaysia | DNS | |

=== Semifinals ===
Qualification: First 4 of each semifinal qualified directly (Q) for the final.

| Rank | Heat | Athlete | Nationality | Time | Notes |
|---|---|---|---|---|---|
| 1 | 2 | Jennifer Buckley | United States | 2:03.32 | Q |
| 2 | 2 | Kumiko Okamoto | Japan | 2:03.45 | Q |
| 3 | 2 | Svetlana Tverdokhleb | Ukraine | 2:03.78 | Q |
| 4 | 2 | Yekaterina Dedkova | Russia | 2:03.88 | Q |
| 5 | 2 | Ester Goossens | Netherlands | 2:03.95 | |
| 6 | 1 | Stella Jongmans | Netherlands | 2:05.10 | Q |
| 7 | 1 | Natalie Tait | Great Britain | 2:05.11 | Q |
| 8 | 1 | Alla Krasnoslobodskaya | Russia | 2:05.48 | Q |
| 9 | 1 | Nicole Teter | United States | 2:05.59 | Q |
| 10 | 1 | Mioara Cosulianu | Romania | 2:05.71 | |
| 11 | 1 | Yuko Tamate | Japan | 2:07.99 | |
| 12 | 2 | Delia Castro | Mexico | 2:08.21 | |
| 13 | 2 | Simona Guarino | Italy | 2:08.61 | |
| 14 | 1 | Stephanie Graf | Austria | 2:10.27 | |
| 15 | 1 | Jennifer Mawby | Canada | 2:10.47 | |
| 16 | 2 | Lorrie Ann Adams | Guyana | 2:10.60 | |

=== Final ===
| Rank | Athlete | Nationality | Time | Notes |
|---|---|---|---|---|
| 1st place, gold medalist(s) | Stella Jongmans | Netherlands | 2:02.13 | |
| 2nd place, silver medalist(s) | Svetlana Tverdokhleb | Ukraine | 2:02.92 | |
| 3rd place, bronze medalist(s) | Natalie Tait | Great Britain | 2:03.32 | |
| 4 | Yekaterina Dedkova | Russia | 2:04.15 | |
| 5 | Alla Krasnoslobodskaya | Russia | 2:05.09 | |
| 6 | Kumiko Okamoto | Japan | 2:05.20 | |
| 7 | Jennifer Buckley | United States | 2:06.09 | |
| 8 | Nicole Teter | United States | 2:07.50 | |
