= 1994 European Athletics Indoor Championships – Women's 800 metres =

The women's 800 metres event at the 1994 European Athletics Indoor Championships was held in Palais Omnisports de Paris-Bercy on 12 and 13 March.

== Medalists ==
Gold	Silver	Bronze
Natalya Dukhnova; Belarus	Ella Kovacs; Romania	Carla Sacramento; Portugal

== Results ==
=== Heats ===
First 3 from each heat qualified directly (Q) for the final.

Rank	Heat	Name	Nationality	Time	Notes
1	2	Ella Kovacs	Romania	2:02.26	Q
2	2	Ester Goossens	Netherlands	2:02.79	Q
3	2	Carla Sacramento	Portugal	2:03.06	Q
4	1	Natalya Dukhnova	Belarus	2:04.06	Q
5	2	Monica Westén	Sweden	2:04.11	
6	1	Stella Jongmans	Netherlands	2:04.27	Q
7	1	Yelena Storchovaya	Ukraine	2:04.33	Q
8	1	Patricia Djaté	France	2:04.67	
9	2	Amaia Andrés	Spain	2:05.60	
10	1	Kati Kovacs	Germany	2:08.93	
11	2	Anneke Matthys	Belgium	2:14.21	

=== Final ===
Rank	Name	Nationality	Time	Notes
1st place, gold medalist(s)	Natalya Dukhnova	Belarus	2:00.42	
2nd place, silver medalist(s)	Ella Kovacs	Romania	2:00.49	
3rd place, bronze medalist(s)	Carla Sacramento	Portugal	2:01.12	
4	Stella Jongmans	Netherlands	2:01.82	
5	Ester Goossens	Netherlands	2:03.59	
6	Yelena Storchovaya	Ukraine	2:06.41	
