= Yelena Afanasyeva (athlete) =

Russian middle-distance runner

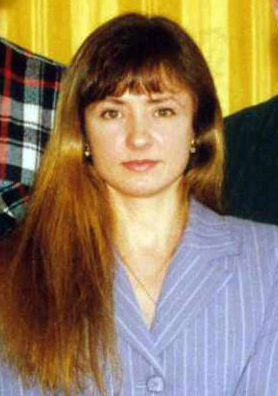

Medal record

Women's athletics

Representing Russia

European Championships
Gold medal – first place	1998 Budapest	800 m

Yelena Aleksandrovna Vlasova-Afanasyeva (Russian: Елена Александровна Афанасьева; born as Vlasova, March 1, 1967, in Kulebaki) is a former Russian athlete who competed in the 800 metres. Her greatest achievements include a European title as well as a 1997 World Championships silver medal. The same year she achieved the time of 1:56.61 minutes in Zurich. Afanasyeva retired after the 2001 season.

== International competitions ==
Representing Russia
Year	Competition	Venue	Position	Event	Notes
1992	World Cup	Havana, Cuba	3rd	800 m	2:02.19
1993	World Indoor Championships	Toronto, Canada	4nd	800 m	2:01.87
1995	World Indoor Championships	Barcelona, Spain	2nd	800 m	1:59.79
1995	World Championships	Gothenburg, Sweden	12th (sf)	800 m	2:03.66
1996	Olympic Games	Atlanta, United States	5th	800 m	1:59.57
1997	World Championships	Athens, Greece	2nd	800 m	1:57.56
1998	European Championships	Budapest, Hungary	1st	800 m	1:58.50
1998	World Cup	Johannesburg, South Africa	2nd	800 m	2:00.20
2001	World Indoor Championships	Lisbon, Portugal	5th	800 m	2:02.17

== See also ==
- List of World Athletics Championships medalists (women)
- List of IAAF World Indoor Championships medalists (women)
- List of European Athletics Championships medalists (women)
- List of European Athletics Indoor Championships medalists (women)
- 800 metres at the World Championships in Athletics
