= Claudia Gesell =

German middle-distance runner

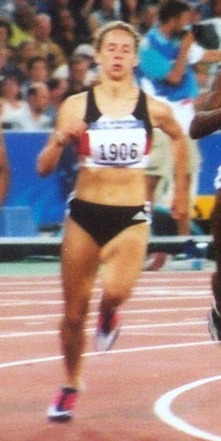
- Claudia Gesell in 2000

Personal information
- Full name: Claudia Andrea Barbara Gesell
- Born: 18 December 1977 (age 48) Tirschenreuth, West Germany

Sport
- Country: Germany
- Sport: Athletics
- Event: 800 metres

Achievements and titles
- Personal best(s): 800 metres: 1:58.34 (Leverkusen; August 2000)

Claudia Andrea Barbara Gesell (born 18 December 1977 in Tirschenreuth) is a former German middle distance runner who specialised in the 800 metres.

== Achievements ==
Year	Competition	Venue	Position	Event	Notes
Representing Germany
1996	World Junior Championships	Sydney, Australia	1st	800m	2:02.67
1996	World Junior Championships	Sydney, Australia	1st	4 × 400 m relay	3:31.12
1997	European U23 Championships	Turku, Finland	4th	800m	2:03.76
1997	European U23 Championships	Turku, Finland	2nd	4 × 400 m relay	3:33.77
1999	European U23 Championships	Gothenburg, Sweden	1st	800m	2:03.05
2002	European Championships	Munich, Germany	5th	800 m	2:00.51
2002	World Cup	Madrid, Spain	6th	800 m	2:01.58
2003	World Championships	Paris, France	5th	800 m	2:01.84
2003	World Athletics Final	Monte Carlo, Monaco	8th	800 m	2:03.66
2005	European Indoor Championships	Madrid, Spain	5th	800 m	2:04.06
