= Élisabeth Grousselle =

French runner (born 1973)

Élisabeth Grousselle (born 6 February 1973) is a retired French middle-distance runner who specialized in the 800 metres.

== Achievements ==
| Year | Competition | Venue | Position | Event | Notes |
Representing France
| 2002 | European Indoor Championships | Vienna, Austria | 3rd | 800 m | 2:01.46 |
| 2002 | European Championships | Munich, Germany | 21st (h) | 800 m | 2:04.07 |
| 2004 | Olympic Games | Athens, Greece | 13th (sf) | 800 m | 2:00.21 |
| 2004 | World Athletics Final | Monte Carlo, Monaco | 5th | 800 m | |
| 2005 | Mediterranean Games | Almería, Spain | 2nd | 800 m | 2:02.47 |
| 2005 | Mediterranean Games | Almería, Spain | 2nd | 4 × 400 m relay | 3:31.86 |
| 2006 | World Indoor Championships | Moscow, Russia | 4th | 800 m | 2:00.74 |
| 2006 | European Championships | Gothenburg, Sweden | 13th (h) | 800 m | 2:02.69 |

=== Personal bests ===
- 200 metres - 25.47 s (2002)
- 400 metres - 55.07 s (2002)
- 800 metres - 1:59.46 min (2004)
