= Sandra Stals =

Belgian middle-distance runner

Personal information
- Born: 5 June 1975 (age 51) Maaseik, Belgium

Sport
- Sport: Track and field
Medal record
Representing Belgium
European Indoor Championships
Bronze medal – third place	2000 Ghent	800m

Sandra Stals (born 5 June 1975) is a retired Belgian middle distance runner who specialized in the 800 metres.

She won the bronze medal at the 2000 European Indoor Championships and finished sixth at the 2002 European Indoor Championships.

Her personal best 800 m time is 1:58.31 minutes, achieved in August 1998 in Hechtel.

== Competition record ==
Year	Competition	Venue	Position	Event	Notes
Representing the Belgium
1994	World Junior Championships	Lisbon, Portugal	37th (h)	800 m	2:21.94
1995	Universiade	Fukuoka, Japan	31st (h)	800 m	2:20.44
1997	European U23 Championships	Turku, Finland	–	800 m	DNF
1998	European Indoor Championships	Valencia, Spain	7th (sf)	800 m	2:04.50
1998	European Championships	Budapest, Hungary	18th (h)	800 m	2:02.34
1999	World Championships	Seville, Spain	16th (sf)	800 m	2:09.22
2000	European Indoor Championships	Ghent, Belgium	3rd	800 m	2:01.34
2000	Olympic Games	Sydney, Australia	20th (h)	800 m	2:02.33
2002	European Indoor Championships	Vienna, Austria	6th	800 m	2:07.33
2002	European Championships	Munich, Germany	11th (sf)	800 m	2:02.44
2003	World Championships	Paris, France	34th (sf)	800 m	2:06.12
2004	World Indoor Championships	Budapest, Hungary	10th (sf)	800 m	2:05.12
2005	European Indoor Championships	Madrid, Spain	5th	800 m	2:08.46
