= Stella Jongmans =

Dutch middle-distance runner (born 1971)

Personal information
- Born: 17 May 1971 (age 55) Voorburg, Netherlands

Sport
- Sport: Track and field
Medal record
Representing Netherlands
European Indoor Championships
| Silver medal – second place | 1996 Stockholm | 800m |
Summer Universiade
| Gold medal – first place | 1995 Fukuoka | 800m |

Stella Helena Jongmans (born 17 May 1971) is a retired Dutch athlete who specialised in the 800 metres. She won the gold at the 1995 Summer Universiade and silver at the 1996 European Indoor Championships. In addition, she represented The Netherlands at two Olympic Games, in 1992 and 1996.

== Competition record ==
| Year | Competition | Venue | Position | Event | Notes |
Representing the Netherlands
| 1989 | European Junior Championships | Varaždin, Yugoslavia | 3rd | 800 m | 2:04.76 |
| 1990 | World Junior Championships | Plovdiv, Bulgaria | 13th (sf) | 800 m | 2:09.89 |
| 1992 | European Indoor Championships | Genoa, Italy | 5th | 800 m | 2:03.50 |
| 1992 | Olympic Games | Barcelona, Spain | 23rd (h) | 800 m | 2:02.26 |
| 1993 | World Indoor Championships | Toronto, Canada | – | 800 m | DQ |
| 1994 | European Indoor Championships | Paris, France | 4th | 800 m | 2:01.82 |
| 1994 | European Championships | Helsinki, Finland | 10th (sf) | 800 m | 2:01.55 |
| 1995 | World Indoor Championships | Barcelona, Spain | 5th | 800 m | 2:01.14 |
| 1995 | World Championships | Gothenburg, Sweden | 15th (sf) | 800 m | 2:05.11 |
| 1995 | Universiade | Fukuoka, Japan | 1st | 800 m | 2:02.13 |
| 1996 | European Indoor Championships | Stockholm, Sweden | 2nd | 800 m | 2:01.88 |
| 1996 | Olympic Games | Atlanta, United States | 16th (h) | 800 m | 2:00.26 |
| 1997 | World Championships | Athens, Greece | 8th | 800 m | 2:05.50 |
| 1998 | European Indoor Championships | Valencia, Spain | 4th | 800 m | 2:03.82 |
| 2000 | European Indoor Championships | Ghent, Belgium | 6th | 800 m | 2:03.11 |

== Personal bests ==
Outdoor

- 400 metres – 53.24 (Hague 1996)
- 800 metres – 1:58.61 (Hengelo 1992)
- 1000 metres – 2:38.10 (Stockholm 1995)
- 1500 metres – 4:15.69 (Assen 1994)
- One mile – 4:38.44 (Hilversum 1994)
- 3000 metres – 9:29.99 (Hague 1992)

Indoor

- 400 metres – 55.18 (Ghent 2000)
- 800 metres – 2:00.6 (Erfurt 2000)
- 1000 metres – 2:39.70 (Liévin 1996)
- 1500 metres – 4:16.65 (Hague 1993)
