= Heidi Jensen =

Danish middle-distance runner (born 1966)

Heidi Kofod Jensen (born 14 August 1966) is a Danish retired athlete who specialised in the middle-distance events. She represented her country at three consecutive World Championships, starting in 1999, her best outing being the 2003 edition where she reached the semifinals.

She currently holds two national records, in the outdoor 1500 metres and the indoor 800 metres.

== Competition record ==
Year	Competition	Venue	Position	Event	Notes
Representing Denmark
1999	World Championships	Seville, Spain	21st (h)	800 m	2:01.12
2000	European Indoor Championships	Ghent, Belgium	11th (h)	800 m	2:04.54
2001	World Indoor Championships	Lisbon, Portugal	14th (h)	1500 m	4:16.31
2001	World Championships	Edmonton, Canada	28th (h)	1500 m	4:17.35
2003	European Indoor Championships	Vienna, Austria	15th (h)	1500 m	4:19.12
2003	European Championships	Munich, Germany	16th (h)	800 m	2:03.41
2003	European Championships	Munich, Germany	24th (h)	1500 m	4:16.01
2003	World Championships	Paris, France	18th (sf)	800 m	2:01.73

== Personal bests ==
Outdoor

- 800 metres – 2:01.11 (Stockholm 2002)
- 1500 metres – 4:07.17 (Kassel 2002) NR
- One mile – 4:30.94 (Heusden-Zolder 2002)

Indoor

- 800 metres – 2:03.33 (Stockholm 2000) NR
- 1500 metres – 4:13.59 (Stockholm 2003)
