= Sharette García =

Belizean middle-distance runner

Personal information
- Nationality: Belizean
- Born: 2 July 1969 (age 57)

Sport
- Sport: Middle-distance running
- Event: 800 metres

Sharette Y. García (born 2 July 1969) is a Belizean middle-distance runner. She competed in the women's 800 metres at the 1996 Summer Olympics.

Garcia competed for the Arizona State Sun Devils track and field team in the NCAA.
