= Lyubov Kiryukhina-Tsyoma =

Soviet middle-distance runner

Lyubov Kiryukhina-Tsyoma (born 19 May 1963, Russian: Любовь Кирюхина-Цёма) is a retired middle-distance runner who represented the Soviet Union and later Russia. She specialized in the 800 metres. She won bronze medals indoors at world and European level in 1987.

She represented her country at the 1996 Summer Olympics, reaching the semi-finals.

She competed at the 1997 World Championships in Athletics but was disqualified for doping. She'd tested positive for the anabolic steroid stanozolol and was subsequently handed a two-year ban from sports.

== International competitions ==
Year	Competition	Venue	Position	Notes
1979	European Junior Championships	Bydgoszcz, Poland	3rd	4 × 400 m relay
1981	European Junior Championships	Utrecht, Netherlands	3rd	800 m
1987	World Indoor Championships	Indianapolis, United States	3rd	800 m
1987	European Indoor Championships	Liévin, France	3rd	800 m
1996	Olympic Games	Atlanta, United States	8th (semis)	800 m
1997	World Championships	Athens, Greece	DQ (semis)	800 m

== See also ==
- List of doping cases in athletics
- List of IAAF World Indoor Championships medalists (women)
- List of European Athletics Indoor Championships medalists (women)
- 800 metres at the World Championships in Athletics
- Russia at the World Athletics Championships
- Doping at the World Athletics Championships
