= Ivonne Teichmann =

German middle-distance runner

Personal information
- Full name: Ivonne Teichmann
- Born: 11 April 1977 (age 49) Zeulenroda, Bezirk Gera, East Germany
- Height: 1.71 m (5 ft 7 in)

Sport
- Country: Germany
- Sport: Athletics
- Event: 800 metres

Achievements and titles
- Personal best(s): 800 metres: 1:58.62 (Brussels; August 2001)

Ivonne Teichmann (born 11 April 1977, in Zeulenroda) is a retired German athlete who specialised in the 800 metres.

She finished eighth at the 2001 World Championships and seventh at the 2002 European Championships.

Her personal best time was 1:58.62 minutes, achieved in August 2001 in Brussels.

== International competitions ==
Year	Competition	Venue	Position	Notes
Representing Germany
1995	European Junior Championships	Nyíregyháza, Hungary	heats	2:08.72
2000	European Indoor Championships	Ghent, Belgium	5th	2:02.26
2001	World Indoor Championships	Lisbon, Portugal	semifinal	2:03.20
2001	European Cup	Bremen, Germany	2nd	1:59.39
2001	World Championships	Edmonton, Canada	8th	2:04.33
2002	European Cup	Annecy, France	3rd	2:00.07
2002	European Championships	Munich, Germany	7th	2:00.87
