= Dawn Williams =

Dawn Williams-Sewer (born 23 December 1973 in Portsmouth, Dominica) she is a retired athlete who competed for Dominica.

She competed at the 1996 Summer Olympic Games in the women's 800 metres, in the first round she finished 3rd and qualified for the semi-final, where she finished 5th and just missed out to a place in the final. Her result was overall in 10th place. This was the best performance by an athlete from Dominica at the Olympics until 2024 and Thea LaFond's gold medal in women's triple jump.

Competing for the Little Rock Trojans track and field team, Williams-Sewer won the 1997 800 meters at the NCAA Division I Indoor Track and Field Championships.
