= Natalya Dukhnova =

Belarusian middle-distance runner

Medal record

Women's athletics

Representing Belarus

European Championships
Silver medal – second place	1994 Helsinki	800 m

Natalya "Natasha" Stanislavovna Dukhnova (Belarusian: Наталля «Наташа» Станіславаўна Духнова; born 16 July 1966) is a retired Belarusian middle-distance runner who mainly competed in the 800 metres.

She was born in Yaroslavl, but represented the club Grodno TU. She competed at the 1993 and 1995 World Championships without reaching the final. Her career peaked in the year 1994. She became European indoor champion in 1994, and in the same year she won the silver medal at the European Championships. She also finished third at the 1994 IAAF World Cup.

She finished seventh in her special event, the 800 metres at the 1996 Olympic Games, and also competed in the 1500 metres without reaching the final. She returned with a silver medal at the 1997 World Indoor Championships, a seventh place at the 1998 European Championships and an eighth place at the 1999 World Championships. She also won a bronze medal at the 1995 Military World Games and a silver medal at the 1999 Military World Games.

However, she often failed to reach the final in large events. She reached the semi-finals at the 1997 World Championships and 1999 World Indoor Championships, and only round one at the 2000 Olympic Games and the 2001 World Championships.

Her personal best times were 1:57.24 minutes in the 800 metres, achieved in June 1996 in Gomel; 4:06.70 minutes in the 1500 metres, achieved in June 1997 in Saint-Denis; and 4:37.35 minutes in the mile run, achieved in July 1997 in Lausanne.
