= Olena Buzhenko =

Ukrainian middle-distance runner

Personal information
- Nationality: Ukrainian
- Born: 16 November 1972 (age 53) Dnipro, Soviet Union

Sport
- Sport: Middle-distance running
- Event: 800 metres
Medal record
Women's athletics
Representing Ukraine
Military World Games
| Silver medal – second place | 1999 Zagreb | 800 m |
Summer Universiade
| Silver medal – second place | 1997 Catania | 800 m |

Olena Buzhenko (born 16 November 1972) is a Ukrainian middle-distance runner. She competed in the women's 800 metres at the 2000 Summer Olympics.
