= Tsvetelina Kirilova =

Bulgarian athletics competitor

Tsvetelina Kirilova (Bulgarian: Цветелина Кирилова) (born 14 July 1977) is a Bulgarian track and field athlete who competes in the 400 metres, the 800 metres and the 400 metres hurdles. Her personal bests are 51.63 in the 400 metres achieved at Ankara on 22 May 1999, 1:59.63 in the 800 metres achieved at Luzern on 27 June 2001 and the 55.22 in the 400 metres hurdles achieved at Beijing on 17 August 2008.

She competed in the 400 metres hurdles at the 2008 Beijing Olympics where qualified for the second round with the fifth fastest overall time of 55.22 seconds, a new personal best.
