= Judit Varga (runner) =

Hungarian middle-distance runner (born 1976)

Personal information
- Nationality: Italian
- Born: 16 April 1976 (age 50) Hungary
- Height: 1.68 m (5 ft 6 in)
- Weight: 49 kg (108 lb)

Sport
- Country: Italy
- Sport: Athletics
- Event: Middle-distance running
- Club: Assindustria Padova

Achievements and titles
- Personal bests: 800 m hs: 1:59.46 (1980); 1500 m hs: 4:01.26 (2002)

Judit Varga (born 16 April 1976) is a Hungarian middle-distance runner who specialized in the 1500 metres. Since 2009 she has been a naturalized Italian.

== Personal bests ==
For Hungary

- 800 metres - 1:59.46 (2003)
- 1500 metres - 4:01.26 (2002)

For Italy

- 800 metres - 2:00.91 (2009)
- 1500 metres - 4:05.60 (2009)

== Achievements ==
Year	Competition	Venue	Position	Event	Notes
Representing Hungary
1997	European U23 Championships	Turku, Finland	6th	800m	2:04.78
1997	European U23 Championships	Turku, Finland	6th	4 × 400 m relay	3:35.89
1998	European Indoor Championships	Valencia, Spain	3rd	800 m	2:03.81
2002	European Championships	Munich, Germany	4th	1500 m	4:02.37
2003	World Athletics Final	Monte Carlo, Monaco	5th	1500 m	4:02.42
2004	World Athletics Final	Monte Carlo, Monaco	12th	1500 m	4:12.19

== See also ==
- Italian all-time top lists - 800 m
- Italian all-time top lists - 1500 m
