= Ludmila Formanová =

Czech middle-distance runner

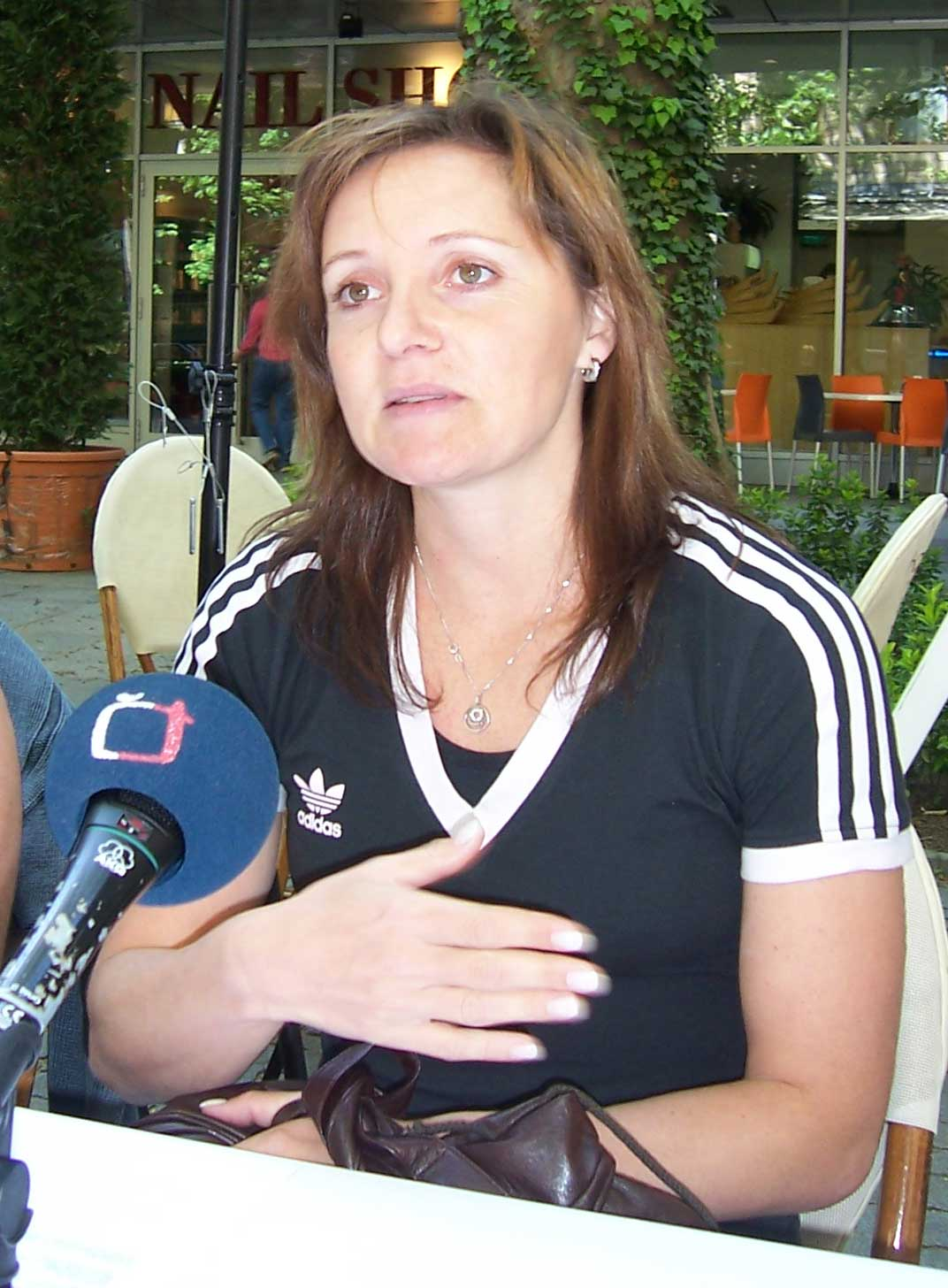

Personal information
- Born: 2 January 1974 (age 52) Čáslav, Czechoslovakia
Medal record
Women's athletics
World Championships
Gold medal – first place	1999 Seville	800 m
World Indoor Championships
Gold medal – first place	1999 Maebashi	800 m

Ludmila Formanová (Czech pronunciation: [ˈludmɪla ˈformanovaː]; born 2 January 1974) is a Czech former middle-distance runner who specialized in the 800 metres. She was born in Čáslav.

In 1999, she broke Maria de Lurdes Mutola's winning streak at the World Indoor Championships and won in a championship record (CR) of 1:56.90. In August, she ran in a personal best time of 1:56.56 (11 August) and won the World Championships (24 August).

She officially finished her active career on 2 May 2007.

== International competitions ==
Year	Competition	Venue	Position	Event	Notes
Representing Czechoslovakia
1992	World Junior Championships	Seoul, South Korea	21st (h)	800 m	2:22.34
Representing the Czech Republic
1993	European Junior Championships	San Sebastián, Spain	1st	800 m	2:06.88
1993	World Championships	Stuttgart, Germany	7th	4 × 400 m relay	3:27.94
1994	European Championships	Helsinki, Finland	5th	4 × 400 m relay	3:27.95
1995	World Indoor Championships	Barcelona, Spain	2nd	4 × 400 m relay	3:30.27
1996	Summer Olympics	Atlanta, United States	7th	4 × 400 m relay	3:26.99
1997	World Championships	Athens, Greece	5th	800 m	1:59.52
1997	World Championships	Athens, Greece	5th	4 × 400 m relay	3:23.73
1998	European Indoor Championships	Valencia, Spain	1st	800 m	2:02.30
1998	European Championships	Budapest, Hungary	5th	4 × 400 m relay	3:27.54
1999	World Indoor Championships	Maebashi, Japan	1st	800 m	1:56.90 CR
1999	World Championships	Seville, Spain	1st	800 m	1:56.68
2002	European Championships	Munich, Germany	4th	800 m	2:00.23
