= Léontine Tsiba =

Congolese middle-distance runner

Personal information
- Nationality: Congolese
- Born: 20 November 1973 (age 52)

Sport
- Sport: Middle-distance running
- Event: 800 metres
Medal record
Women's athletics
Representing Republic of the Congo
African Championships
Silver medal – second place	1996 Yaoundé	800 m
Bronze medal – third place	1996 Yaoundé	1500 m

Léontine Tsiba (born 20 November 1973) is a Congolese middle-distance runner. She competed in the 800 metres at the 1996 Summer Olympics and the 2000 Summer Olympics.
