= Petya Strashilova =

Bulgarian middle-distance runner

Personal information
- Born: 18 March 1965 (age 61) Stara Zagora, Bulgaria

Sport
- Sport: Track and field

Petya Toneva Strashilova (Bulgarian: Петя Тонева Страшилова, born 18 March 1965) is a retired Bulgarian middle-distance runner who specialized in the 800 and 1500 metres.

She was born in Stara Zagora, and represented the clubs Beroe Stara Zagora, Levski-Spartak Club and Sofia. She competed at the 1995 World Indoor Championships, the 1995 World Championships, the 1996 Summer Olympics (both 800 metres and 1500 metres) and the 1997 World Championships without reaching the final round.

She became Bulgarian 400 metres champion in 1995, 1997 and 1998. She became 800 metres champion in 1990, 1991, 1992, 1993, 1994, 1995, 1997 and 1998, and 1500 metres champion in 1991, 1992, 1993 and 1994. She also became Bulgarian indoor champion in the 400 metres in 1990, 1994, 1995 and 1997 and in the 1500 metres in 1997.

Her personal best time in the 800 metres was 1:59.38 minutes, achieved in May 1998 in Sofia. She also had 2:34.8 minutes in the 1000 metres, achieved in July 1995 in Sofia, and 4:11.62 minutes in the 1500 metres, achieved in 1995.
