= Hasna Benhassi =

Moroccan middle-distance runner

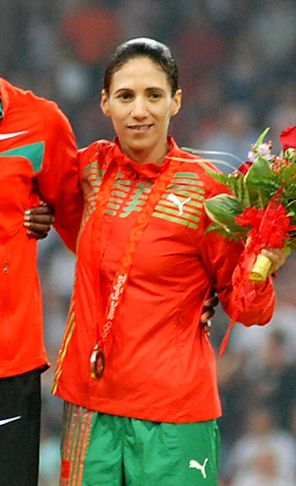
- Benhassi at the 2008 Olympics

Personal information
- Born: 1 June 1978 (age 48) Marrakesh, Morocco
- Height: 166 cm (5 ft 5 in)
- Weight: 47 kg (104 lb)

Sport
- Sport: Athletics
- Events: 800 m, 1500 m

Achievements and titles
- Personal bests: 800 m – 1:56.43 (2004); 1500 m – 4:02.54 (2003)
Medal record
Women's athletics
Representing Morocco
Olympic Games
Silver medal – second place	2004 Athens	800 m
Bronze medal – third place	2008 Beijing	800 m
World Championships
Silver medal – second place	2005 Helsinki	800 m
Silver medal – second place	2007 Osaka	800 m
World Indoor Championships
Bronze medal – third place	2006 Moscow	800 m
Gold medal – first place	2001 Lisbon	1500 m
African Championships
Gold medal – first place	2000 Algiers	800 m
Silver medal – second place	1998 Dakar	800 m
Silver medal – second place	2000 Algiers	4×400 m
Bronze medal – third place	2002 Radès	1500 m
Mediterranean Games
Gold medal – first place	1997 Bari	800 m

Hasna Benhassi (Arabic: حسنة بنحسي; born 1 June 1978) is a Moroccan retired middle-distance runner. She competed at the 2000, 2004 and 2008 Olympics and won two medals in the 800 m event, in 2004 and 2008. At the world championships she won a gold medal over 1500 m indoors in 2001 and silver medals over 800 m outdoors in 2005 and 2007. In 2004, she was named Sportsperson of the Year in Morocco after a survey conducted by the Moroccan Radio among 43 press institutions.

Benhassi is married to the fellow Olympic middle-distance runner Mouhssin Chehibi; they have a daughter named Farah.
