= Jolanda Čeplak =

Slovenian middle distance athlete (born 1976)

Medal record

Women's Athletics

Representing Slovenia

Olympic Games
Bronze medal – third place	2004 Athens	800 m

World Indoor Championships
Silver medal – second place	2004 Budapest	800 m

European Championships
Gold medal – first place	2002 Munich	800 m

European Indoor Championships
Gold medal – first place	2002 Vienna	800 m
Bronze medal – third place	2007 Birmingham	800 m

Jolanda Batagelj (previously known as Jolanda Čeplak pronounced until 2002, born Jolanda Steblovnik on 12 September 1976) is a Slovenian middle distance athlete. She was born in Celje and lived in Velenje until briefly moving to Monaco. She has lived in Celje since.

== Running career ==
In her early career, she did not specialise, and ran at many distances. She later settled on the 800 metres where she found relative success on the IAAF Golden League circuit, despite having to compete against Maria de Lurdes Mutola, who went unbeaten at all major championships from 1999 until the 2004 Summer Olympics.

Her most successful season was 2002. On 2 March at the European Indoor Championships in Vienna she beat local favourite Stephanie Graf and set the indoor world record at 1:55.82. In the same year at the European Championships in Munich she became the European champion.

At the 2004 Olympics in Athens, Čeplak finished very strongly in the 800 m but could not quite catch winner Kelly Holmes and finished with exactly the same time as Hasna Benhassi. A photo-finish showed her in third-place, winning the bronze medal.

=== PED use and suspension ===
On 18 June 2007, Čeplak tested positive on erythropoietin. On 26 July, IAAF announced that the B test confirmed the result of the A test. Čeplak said that she has never taken any illegal substances and would try to prove her innocence with all means possible. She received a two-year suspension, and returned to competition in July 2009, but with only modest success. She ended her representative international career in September 2009.

== Personal life ==
After a divorce from Aleš Čeplak in 2007, she married triple jumper Andrej Batagelj from Nova Gorica in 2009. They live in Celje.

== Major achievements ==
- 2002
  - European Indoor Championships – Vienna, Austria.
    - 800 m gold medal and world record
  - European Championships – Munich, Germany.
    - 800 m gold medal
  - IAAF World Cup - Madrid, Spain.
    - 800 m bronze medal
  - European Cup B League Final – Banská Bystrica, Slovakia.
    - 800 m gold medal
- 2003
  - European Cup B League Final – Velenje, Slovenia.
    - 800 m gold medal
- 2004
  - 2004 Summer Olympics – Athens, Greece.
    - 800 m bronze medal
  - World Indoor Championships – Budapest, Hungary.
    - 800 m silver medal
- 2007
  - European Indoor Championships – Birmingham, England.
    - 800 m bronze medal

== See also ==
- List of sportspeople sanctioned for doping offences

Records
Preceded by (East Germany) Christine Wachtel	Women's 800 m Indoor World Record Holder; 3 March 2002 – present	Succeeded by Incumbent
