= Natalya Tsyganova =

Russian middle-distance runner

Natalya Tsyganova (born 7 February 1971 in Frunze, Kyrgyz SSR) is a Russian middle distance runner who specializes in the 800 metres.

== International competitions ==
Representing Russia
Year	Competition	Venue	Position	Event	Notes
1999	World Indoor Championships	Maebashi, Japan	3rd	800 m	
1999	World Championships	Seville, Spain	5th	800 m	
2000	European Indoor Championships	Ghent, Belgium	2nd	800 m	
2005	European Indoor Championships	Ghent, Belgium	3rd	800 m	

== Personal bests ==
- 400 metres - 52.02 s (1998)
- 800 metres - 1:56.60 min (2000)
- 1500 metres - 4:08.07 min (1999)

== See also ==
- List of eligibility transfers in athletics
- List of European Athletics Indoor Championships medalists (women)
- List of IAAF World Indoor Championships medalists (women)
