= Virginie Fouquet =

French middle-distance runner

Personal information
- Nationality: French
- Born: 9 September 1975 (age 51) Lille, France
- Years active: 1998–2004

Sport
- Event: Middle distance running
- Club: Athletic Club de Villeneuve-d'Ascq

Virginie Fouquet (French: [viʁʒini fukɛ]; born 9 September 1975) is a former French athlete, who specialized in middle-distance running.

== Biography ==
She won three 800m French Championships: two Outdoor in 2001 and 2003, and one Indoor in 1998. In 2004, she became champion of France Indoors for the 400 meters.

=== Prize list ===
- French Championships in Athletics :
  - winner of the 800m 2001 and 2003
- French Indoor Championships in Athletics:
  - winner of the 400m 2004
  - winner of the 800m 1998

=== Records ===
Personal Bests
Event	Performance	Location	Date
800 m	1:59.78	Monaco	19 July 2002
