= Stephanie Graf =

Austrian middle-distance runner

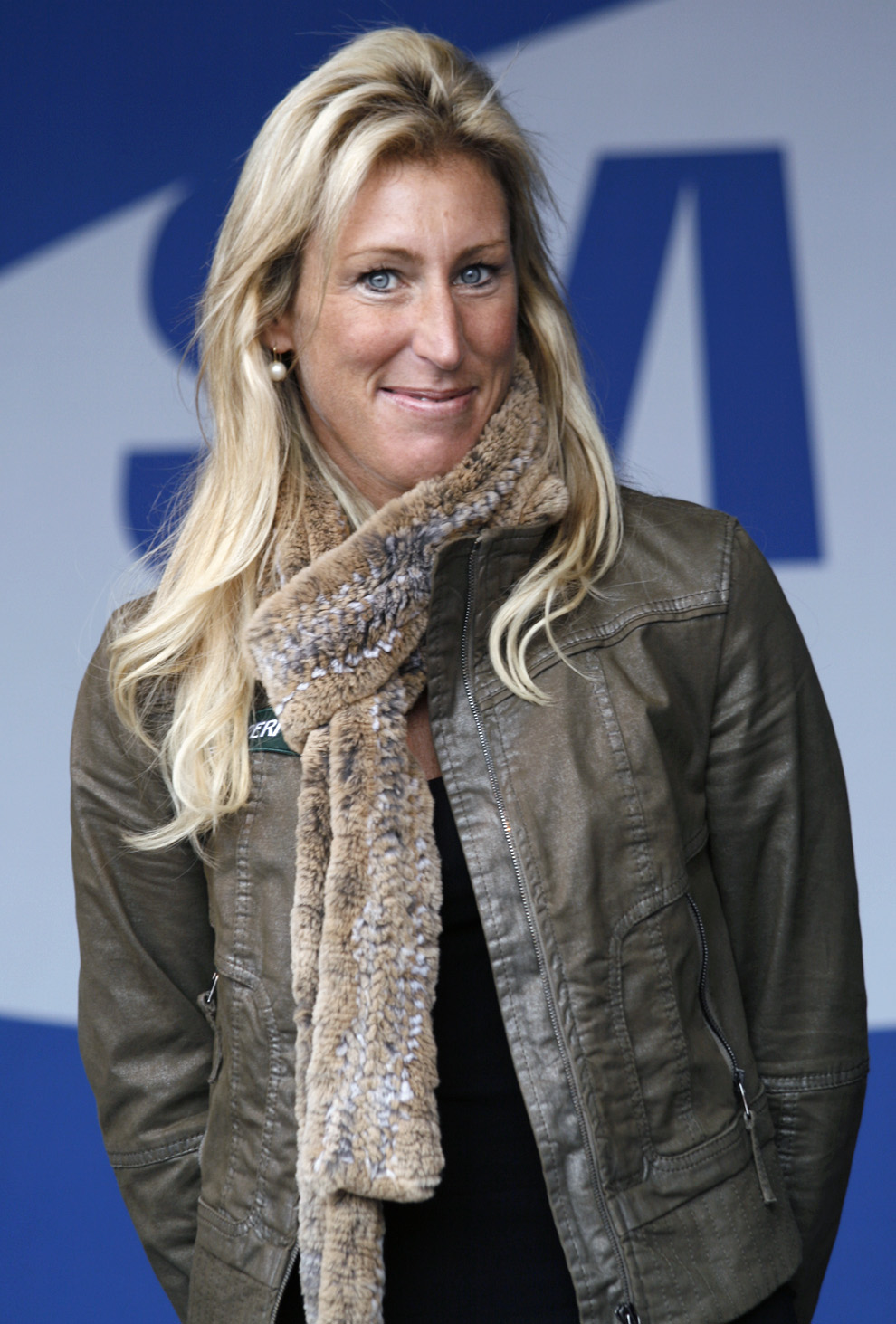
- Stephanie Graf, Vienna, 2008

Personal information
- Born: 26 April 1973 (age 53) Klagenfurt, Austria

Sport
- Sport: Track and field
Medal record
Representing Austria
Olympic Games
Silver medal – second place	2000 Sydney	800 m
World Championships
Silver medal – second place	2001 Edmonton	800 m
World Indoor Championships
Silver medal – second place	2001 Lisbon	800 m
Silver medal – second place	2003 Birmingham	800 m
European Championships
Bronze medal – third place	1998 Budapest	800 m
European Indoor Championships
Gold medal – first place	2000 Ghent	800 m
Silver medal – second place	2002 Vienna	800 m

Stephanie Graf (born 26 April 1973) is an Austrian former middle distance runner who won silver medals in the 800 metres at both the Olympic Games and the World Athletics Championships. In June 2010, Graf was suspended for two years for an anti-doping rule violation.

== Biography ==
Graf finished second to Maria de Lurdes Mutola in the women's 800 meters at both the 2000 Olympics in Sydney and the 2001 World Athletics Championships in Edmonton, Alberta. Her personal best of 1:56.64, set at the 2000 Olympics, is the current Austrian 800 metres record. Her indoor personal best of 1:55.85, run at the 2002 European Athletics Indoor Championships, is the current Austrian 800 metres indoor record and the third-best indoor mark in history, only behind Jolanda Čeplak in the same race and Keely Hodgkinson's world record time of 1:54.87.

Proceedings were issued against Graf by the Austria's anti-doping authority in May 2010. Following the revelation that the Humanplasma laboratory had aided around 30 athletes with blood doping practices, Graf admitted that her blood had been taken at the lab, but insisted that it had never been re-injected (which would have improved her performances). In June 2010, Graf was suspended for two years for the attempted use of a prohibited method.

Awards
Preceded by (Austria) Alexandra Meissnitzer	Austrian Sportswoman of the year 2000 – 2001	Succeeded by (Austria) Mirna Jukić
Preceded by (Norway) Trine Hattestad	Women's European Athlete of the Year; 2001	Succeeded by (Turkey) Süreyya Ayhan
