= Athletics at the 2003 Summer Universiade – Women's 800 metres =

The women's 800 metres event at the 2003 Summer Universiade was held in Daegu, South Korea on 27–30 August.

The winning margin was 0.05 seconds which as of 2024 remains the narrowest winning margin in the women's 800 metres at these games.

== Medalists ==
Gold	Silver	Bronze
Liliana Barbulescu; Romania	Anna Zagórska; Poland	Irina Vashentseva; Russia

== Results ==
=== Heats ===
Rank	Heat	Athlete	Nationality	Time	Notes
1	1	Irina Vashentseva	Russia	2:02.91	Q
2	1	Miki Nishimura	Japan	2:03.44	Q
3	1	Sandra Teixeira	Portugal	2:03.87	q
4	4	Anna Zagórska	Poland	2:03.94	Q
5	4	Liu Qing	China	2:04.51	Q
6	4	Alexia Oberstolz	Italy	2:04.59	q
7	1	Sviatlana Klimkovich	Belarus	2:04.60	q
8	6	Tamara Volkova	Ukraine	2:04.91	Q
9	3	Laura Gerber	Switzerland	2:04.92	Q
10	4	Becky Lyne	Great Britain	2:04.93	q
11	6	Mihaela Olaru	Romania	2:04.98	Q
12	6	Sonja Roman	Slovenia	2:05.24	
13	3	Tatyana Yegorova	Russia	2:05.43	Q
14	3	Najla Jaber	Netherlands	2:05.44	
15	5	Christiane dos Santos	Brazil	2:05.95	Q
16	5	Liliana Barbulescu	Romania	2:06.06	Q
17	1	Houria Chlihi	Morocco	2:06.40	
18	5	Rikke Rønholt	Denmark	2:06.52	
19	5	Aimee Teteris	Canada	2:06.83	
20	4	Kristin Roset	Norway	2:06.85	
21	3	Sheena Gooding	Barbados	2:07.14	
22	6	Binnaz Uslu	Turkey	2:07.27	
23	3	Melissa Thomas	New Zealand	2:08.35	
24	2	Anny Christofidou	Cyprus	2:08.77	Q
25	5	Lisbeth Pedersen	Norway	2:08.86	
26	2	Joanna Buza	Poland	2:09.10	Q
27	4	Rochelle Heron	New Zealand	2:09.64	
28	6	Chantal Breedt	South Africa	2:10.50	
29	2	Tatsiana Buloichik	Belarus	2:10.73	
30	1	Lisa van der Merwe	South Africa	2:11.91	
31	6	Irina Krakoviak	Lithuania	2:12.42	
32	5	Euridice Borges Semedo	São Tomé and Príncipe	2:13.87	
33	2	Nam Sun-ha	South Korea	2:14.89	
34	1	Yuliya Belkova	Azerbaijan	2:14.95	
35	3	Buathip Boonprasert	Thailand	2:15.01	
36	3	Sudati Masasu	Uganda	2:18.01	
37	4	Catherine Angwech	Uganda	2:23.17	
38	2	Wongani Lornifar Chirwa	Malawi	2:55.38	

=== Semifinals ===
Rank	Heat	Athlete	Nationality	Time	Notes
1	1	Irina Vashentseva	Russia	2:01.59	Q
2	1	Anna Zagórska	Poland	2:01.95	Q
3	1	Liliana Barbulescu	Romania	2:02.11	Q
4	1	Sandra Teixeira	Portugal	2:02.42	q
5	1	Christiane dos Santos	Brazil	2:02.67	q
6	2	Tamara Volkova	Ukraine	2:03.11	Q
7	1	Miki Nishimura	Japan	2:03.23	
8	2	Laura Gerber	Switzerland	2:03.40	Q
9	2	Tatyana Yegorova	Russia	2:03.40	Q
10	2	Anny Christofidou	Cyprus	2:03.45	NR
11	2	Mihaela Olaru	Romania	2:03.45	
12	2	Liu Qing	China	2:03.46	
13	2	Joanna Buza	Poland	2:03.84	
14	1	Alexia Oberstolz	Italy	2:05.14	
15	2	Sviatlana Klimkovich	Belarus	2:05.91	
	1	Becky Lyne	Great Britain	DNF	

=== Final ===
Rank	Athlete	Nationality	Time	Notes
1st place, gold medalist(s)	Liliana Barbulescu	Romania	2:00.06	
2nd place, silver medalist(s)	Anna Zagórska	Poland	2:00.11	
3rd place, bronze medalist(s)	Irina Vashentseva	Russia	2:00.77	
4	Laura Gerber	Switzerland	2:01.39	
5	Christiane dos Santos	Brazil	2:01.53	
6	Tamara Volkova	Ukraine	2:01.86	
7	Tatyana Yegorova	Russia	2:02.64	
8	Sandra Teixeira	Portugal	2:03.01	
