= 2001 European Athletics U23 Championships – Women's 800 metres =

The women's 800 metres event at the 2001 European Athletics U23 Championships was held in Amsterdam, Netherlands, at Olympisch Stadion on 14 and 15 July.

== Medalists ==
Gold	Anna Zagórska; Poland
Silver	Irina Somesan; Romania
Bronze	Tatyana Rodionova; Russia

== Results ==
=== Final ===
15 July

Rank	Name	Nationality	Time	Notes
1st place, gold medalist(s)	Anna Zagórska	Poland	2:07.27	
2nd place, silver medalist(s)	Irina Somesan	Romania	2:07.27	
3rd place, bronze medalist(s)	Tatyana Rodionova	Russia	2:07.60	
4	Olga Mikayeva	Russia	2:07.70	
5	Yuliya Gurtovenko	Ukraine	2:08.40	
6	Natalia Vasko	Belarus	2:08.53	
7	Suvi Myllymäki	Finland	2:09.15	
8	Aurélie Coulaud	France	2:09.57	

=== Heats ===
14 July
Qualified: first 3 in each heat and 2 best to the Final

==== Heat 1 ====
Rank	Name	Nationality	Time	Notes
1	Irina Somesan	Romania	2:03.79	Q
2	Olga Mikayeva	Russia	2:03.94	Q
3	Yuliya Gurtovenko	Ukraine	2:04.23	Q
4	Aurélie Coulaud	France	2:04.36	q
5	Alex Carter	United Kingdom	2:05.24	
6	Kristin Roset	Norway	2:05.38	
7	Petra Ptiček	Croatia	2:05.79	
8	Lotte Visschers	Netherlands	2:07.70	

==== Heat 2 ====
Rank	Name	Nationality	Time	Notes
1	Anna Zagórska	Poland	2:04.42	Q
2	Tatyana Rodionova	Russia	2:04.47	Q
3	Suvi Myllymäki	Finland	2:04.60	Q
4	Natalia Vasko	Belarus	2:04.85	q
5	Aoife Byrne	Ireland	2:04.96	
6	Monika Gradzki	Germany	2:05.71	
7	Lena Nilsson	Sweden	2:06.77	
8	Inesa Kliukoitytė	Lithuania	2:11.04	

== Participation ==
According to an unofficial count, 16 athletes from 15 countries participated in the event.

- Belarus (1)
- Croatia (1)
- Finland (1)
- France (1)
- Germany (1)
- Ireland (1)
- Lithuania (1)
- Netherlands (1)
- Norway (1)
- Poland (1)
- Romania (1)
- Russia (2)
- Sweden (1)
- Ukraine (1)
- United Kingdom (1)
