= Athletics at the 2007 Summer Universiade – Women's 800 metres =

The women's 800 metres event at the 2007 Summer Universiade was held on 11–14 August.

== Medalists ==
Gold	Silver	Bronze
Yuliya Krevsun; Ukraine	Yekaterina Kostetskaya; Russia	Charlotte Best; Great Britain

== Results ==
=== Heats ===
Qualification: First 3 of each heat (Q) and the next 4 fastest (q) qualified for the semifinals.

Rank	Heat	Name	Nationality	Time	Notes
1	2	Yekaterina Kostetskaya	Russia	2:05.38	Q
2	2	Julia Howard	Canada	2:05.49	Q
3	2	Laura Finucane	Great Britain	2:05.57	Q
4	2	Alena Rücklová	Czech Republic	2:05.65	q
5	3	Jekaterina Duman	Estonia	2:07.80	Q
6	3	Charlotte Best	Great Britain	2:07.93	Q
7	3	Antonella Riva	Italy	2:08.27	Q
8	2	Antony Vijila	India	2:08.51	q
9	1	Yuliya Krevsun	Ukraine	2:09.38	Q
10	4	Natallia Kareiva	Belarus	2:09.56	Q
11	3	Anita Banović	Croatia	2:09.64	q
12	4	Olga Cristea	Moldova	2:09.65	Q
13	1	Jekaterina Šakovič	Lithuania	2:09.71	Q
14	4	Mapaseka Makhanya	South Africa	2:09.97	Q
15	1	Rebecca Johnstone	Canada	2:10.23	Q
16	3	Loredana Vlaicu	Romania	2:10.56	q
17	4	Simona Barcău	Romania	2:10.72	
18	4	Margarita Matsko	Kazakhstan	2:12.16	
19	1	Buatip Boonprasert	Thailand	2:14.50	
20	1	Boikhutso Ramonene	Botswana	2:16.93	
21	2	Rashida Ayumah	Ghana	2:18.03	
22	4	Akuvi Degbotse-Goe	Togo	2:22.35	PB
23	3	Grace Mitambo	Kenya	2:22.82	
24	1	Nokuthula Khumalo	Swaziland	2:28.13	PB
25	3	Joyce Balle Baako	Uganda	2:28.99	
26	1	Gloria Moussallem	Lebanon	3:00.98	
	2	Seynabou Paye	Senegal	DNS	

=== Semifinals ===
Qualification: First 4 of each semifinal qualified directly (Q) for the final.

Rank	Heat	Name	Nationality	Time	Notes
1	1	Yuliya Krevsun	Ukraine	2:00.71	Q
2	1	Yekaterina Kostetskaya	Russia	2:02.00	Q
3	1	Charlotte Best	Great Britain	2:03.02	Q
4	1	Olga Cristea	Moldova	2:03.49	Q
5	1	Jekaterina Šakovič	Lithuania	2:04.18	
6	1	Antonella Riva	Italy	2:04.27	
7	2	Natallia Kareiva	Belarus	2:04.71	Q
8	2	Laura Finucane	Great Britain	2:05.25	Q
9	2	Rebecca Johnstone	Canada	2:05.31	Q
10	2	Alena Rücklová	Czech Republic	2:05.31	Q
11	2	Antony Vijila	India	2:05.93	
12	2	Jekaterina Duman	Estonia	2:06.50	PB
13	2	Mapaseka Makhanya	South Africa	2:06.51	
14	1	Julia Howard	Canada	2:07.64	
15	2	Anita Banović	Croatia	2:08.81	
16	1	Loredana Vlaicu	Romania	2:14.57	

=== Final ===
Rank	Name	Nationality	Time	Notes
1st place, gold medalist(s)	Yuliya Krevsun	Ukraine	1:57.63	PB
2nd place, silver medalist(s)	Yekaterina Kostetskaya	Russia	1:59.52	
3rd place, bronze medalist(s)	Charlotte Best	Great Britain	2:01.50	PB
4	Olga Cristea	Moldova	2:01.84	
5	Natallia Kareiva	Belarus	2:02.05	
6	Laura Finucane	Great Britain	2:03.18	
7	Alena Rücklová	Czech Republic	2:04.25	
8	Rebecca Johnstone	Canada	2:04.47	
