= 2004 World Junior Championships in Athletics – Women's 800 metres =

The women's 800 metres event at the 2004 World Junior Championships in Athletics was held in Grosseto, Italy, at Stadio Olimpico Carlo Zecchini on 13, 14 and 16 July.

== Medalists ==
Gold	Natalya Koreyvo; Belarus
Silver	Simona Barcău; Romania
Bronze	Kay-Ann Thompson; Jamaica

== Results ==
=== Final ===
16 July

Rank	Name	Nationality	Time	Notes
1st place, gold medalist(s)	Natalya Koreyvo	Belarus	2:01.47	
2nd place, silver medalist(s)	Simona Barcău	Romania	2:02.23	
3rd place, bronze medalist(s)	Kay-Ann Thompson	Jamaica	2:02.67	
4	Mariya Shapayeva	Russia	2:02.87	
5	Élodie Guégan	France	2:03.68	
6	Larisa Arcip	Romania	2:04.09	
7	Laura Finucane	United Kingdom	2:05.69	
8	Yelena Bondar	Ukraine	2:08.29	
9	Halima Hachlaf	Morocco	2:09.26	
	Binnaz Uslu	Turkey	DNS	

=== Semifinals ===
14 July

==== Semifinal 1 ====
Rank	Name	Nationality	Time	Notes
1	Binnaz Uslu	Turkey	2:02.85	Q
2	Mariya Shapayeva	Russia	2:03.15	Q
3	Simona Barcău	Romania	2:04.55	Q
4	Larisa Arcip	Romania	2:05.05	q
5	Kay-Ann Thompson	Jamaica	2:05.13	q
6	Charlotte Moore	United Kingdom	2:05.89	
7	Yekaterina Martynova	Russia	2:06.16	
8	Latavia Thomas	United States	2:09.11	

==== Semifinal 2 ====
Rank	Name	Nationality	Time	Notes
1	Halima Hachlaf	Morocco	2:06.78	Q
2	Natalya Koreyvo	Belarus	2:06.78	Q
3	Yelena Bondar	Ukraine	2:06.93	Q
4	Brooke Simpson	Australia	2:07.24	
5	Diana Dienel	Germany	2:07.78	
6	Lydia Wafula	Kenya	2:09.05	
7	Élodie Guégan	France	2:10.47	q
8	Laura Finucane	United Kingdom	2:17.59	q

=== Heats ===
13 July

==== Heat 1 ====
Rank	Name	Nationality	Time	Notes
1	Yekaterina Martynova	Russia	2:05.94	Q
2	Halima Hachlaf	Morocco	2:06.44	Q
3	Yelena Bondar	Ukraine	2:06.81	q
4	Marte Elden	Norway	2:07.55	
5	Linda Feldberga	Latvia	2:07.63	
6	Trisa Nickoley	United States	2:09.66	

==== Heat 2 ====
Rank	Name	Nationality	Time	Notes
1	Natalya Koreyvo	Belarus	2:07.68	Q
2	Charlotte Moore	United Kingdom	2:07.93	Q
3	Anna Klyushkina	Kyrgyzstan	2:08.22	
4	Angela Wagner	South Africa	2:08.27	
5	Marjolein Terwiel	Switzerland	2:09.26	
6	Katherine Katsanevakis	Australia	2:09.36	
7	Moleboheng Mafata	Lesotho	2:21.15	

==== Heat 3 ====
Rank	Name	Nationality	Time	Notes
1	Binnaz Uslu	Turkey	2:05.46	Q
2	Élodie Guégan	France	2:05.49	Q
3	Latavia Thomas	United States	2:07.17	q
4	Yuriko Kobayashi	Japan	2:07.56	
5	Tatsiana Suprun	Belarus	2:08.42	
6	Marlyse Nsourou	Gabon	2:14.73	
7	Nadia Gomes	Cape Verde	2:32.58	

==== Heat 4 ====
Rank	Name	Nationality	Time	Notes
1	Simona Barcău	Romania	2:04.30	Q
2	Mariya Shapayeva	Russia	2:04.31	Q
3	Diana Dienel	Germany	2:04.34	q
4	Kay-Ann Thompson	Jamaica	2:06.11	q
5	Brooke Simpson	Australia	2:06.71	q
6	Lydia Wafula	Kenya	2:07.39	q
7	Julia Baier	Austria	2:10.08	

==== Heat 5 ====
Rank	Name	Nationality	Time	Notes
1	Laura Finucane	United Kingdom	2:07.10	Q
2	Larisa Arcip	Romania	2:07.32	Q
3	Marie-Noëlle Gaudin	France	2:07.93	
4	Natalya Lupu	Ukraine	2:09.30	
5	Akari Kishikawa	Japan	2:09.38	
6	Anna Chiara Spigarolo	Italy	2:10.85	
7	Jane Mwikali Muia	Kenya	2:12.04	

== Participation ==
According to an unofficial count, 34 athletes from 24 countries participated in the event.

- Australia (2)
- Austria (1)
- Belarus (2)
- Cape Verde (1)
- France (2)
- Gabon (1)
- Germany (1)
- Italy (1)
- Jamaica (1)
- Japan (2)
- Kenya (2)
- Kyrgyzstan (1)
- Latvia (1)
- Lesotho (1)
- Morocco (1)
- Norway (1)
- Romania (2)
- Russia (2)
- South Africa (1)
- Switzerland (1)
- Turkey (1)
- Ukraine (2)
- United Kingdom (2)
- United States (2)
