= Emily Diamond =

British track and field athlete

Medal record

Women's athletics

Representing Great Britain

Olympic Games
Bronze medal – third place	2016 Rio de Janeiro	4 × 400 m relay

World Championships
Silver medal – second place	2017 London	4 × 400 m relay

European Championships
Gold medal – first place	2016 Amsterdam	4 × 400 m relay
Bronze medal – third place	2014 Zürich	4 × 400 m relay
Bronze medal – third place	2018 Berlin	4 × 400 m relay

Emily Diamond (born 11 June 1991 in Bristol) is a British track and field athlete, who competes in the 200 metres and 400 metres. Diamond came to prominence in her breakout season of 2016 when, following her first win at the British Championships over the 400 metres distance, she collected a gold medal in the 4 × 400 metres relay at the 2016 European Athletics Championships as part of the Great Britain team, followed by a bronze in the same discipline at the 2016 Summer Olympics.

== Career ==
Diamond took up athletics whilst attending Bristol Grammar School, where she notably beat Nicola Phillips in the 1500 m at Sports Day. While there she won the junior girls' race at the Bristol Schools' Cross Country Championships. In 2009, representing Avon, she won the English Schools' senior girls' 200 metres title. Both her mother and grandmother had previously competed for England in long jump.

Diamond was selected for Great Britain team at the 2011 World University Games held in Shenzhen, Guangdong, China. Competing in the 200 metres she progressed to the final and finished eighth. Diamond also ran a leg of the 4 × 400 metres relay winning a bronze medal as part of a team with Kelly Massey, Charlotte Best and Meghan Beesley. At the 2010 World Junior Championships in Athletics held in Moncton, New Brunswick, Canada, Diamond made the final of the 200 metres and finished in sixth position with a time of 23.62 seconds.

At the 2012 UK Olympic Trials in Birmingham Diamond ran a time of 53.36 seconds to finish fourth in the final of the 400 metres. This result lead to her being selected as a reserve for the women's 4 × 400 metres relay squad at the Great Britain at the 2012 Summer Olympics in London. Her selection came despite Diamond having only run the distance competitively six times in outdoor competition.

Diamond was part of the English 4 x 400 metres team that won bronze at the 2014 Commonwealth Games, but only ran in the heats. In 2016, she won a gold medal as part of the Great Britain 4 × 400 m team at the European Championships, her first senior gold medal. She won a bronze medal in the 4 × 400 metres relay at the 2016 Summer Olympics in Rio. In the individual event, she reached the semifinals. She was part of the Great Britain squad that won silver at the 2017 World Championships. Diamond is a member of the Bristol and West Athletic Club and also represents Loughborough University where she is coached by former international 400 metres runner Jared Deacon.
