= 2004 World Junior Championships in Athletics – Women's 1500 metres =

The women's 1500 metres event at the 2004 World Junior Championships in Athletics was held in Grosseto, Italy, at Stadio Olimpico Carlo Zecchini on 16 and 18 July.

== Medalists ==
Gold	Nelya Neporadna; Ukraine
Silver	Anna Alminova; Russia
Bronze	Siham Hilali; Morocco

== Results ==
=== Final ===
18 July

Rank	Name	Nationality	Time	Notes
1st place, gold medalist(s)	Nelya Neporadna	Ukraine	4:15.90	
2nd place, silver medalist(s)	Anna Alminova	Russia	4:16.32	
3rd place, bronze medalist(s)	Siham Hilali	Morocco	4:17.39	
4	Danielle Barnes	United Kingdom	4:17.72	
5	Brooke Simpson	Australia	4:19.13	
6	Nicolene van Rooyen	South Africa	4:19.39	
7	Marta Wojtkunska	Poland	4:19.59	
8	Chahrazad Cheboub	Algeria	4:19.72	
9	Jelena Stina	Latvia	4:19.96	
10	Stephanie Thieke	Germany	4:26.22	
11	Naomi Kipkemboi	Kenya	4:26.89	
12	Ayako Uchino	Japan	4:26.96	

=== Heats ===
16 July

==== Heat 1 ====
Rank	Name	Nationality	Time	Notes
1	Anna Alminova	Russia	4:24.43	Q
2	Siham Hilali	Morocco	4:25.73	Q
3	Danielle Barnes	United Kingdom	4:26.16	Q
4	Brooke Simpson	Australia	4:26.56	Q
5	Azra Eminovic	Serbia and Montenegro	4:27.22	
6	Joyce Musungu	Kenya	4:28.25	
7	Li Zhenzhu	China	4:28.53	
8	Alyson Kohlmeier	Canada	4:28.58	
9	Elisabetta Petracca	Italy	4:30.62	
10	Jessica Quispe	Peru	4:34.69	
11	Yousra Jemmali	Tunisia	4:34.92	
12	Jessica Eldridge	United States	4:36.48	

==== Heat 2 ====
Rank	Name	Nationality	Time	Notes
1	Nelya Neporadna	Ukraine	4:16.54	Q
2	Chahrazad Cheboub	Algeria	4:16.97	Q
3	Nicolene van Rooyen	South Africa	4:17.83	Q
4	Marta Wojtkunska	Poland	4:17.87	Q
5	Stephanie Thieke	Germany	4:18.42	q
6	Jelena Stina	Latvia	4:19.18	q
7	Ayako Uchino	Japan	4:23.97	q
8	Naomi Kipkemboi	Kenya	4:24.27	q
9	Madeline Heiner	Australia	4:25.13	
10	Sanna Kaaria	Finland	4:26.45	
11	Elizet Banda	Zambia	4:32.17	
12	Sarah Bowman	United States	4:36.13	

== Participation ==
According to an unofficial count, 24 athletes from 21 countries participated in the event.

- Algeria (1)
- Australia (2)
- Canada (1)
- China (1)
- Finland (1)
- Germany (1)
- Italy (1)
- Japan (1)
- Kenya (2)
- Latvia (1)
- Morocco (1)
- Peru (1)
- Poland (1)
- Russia (1)
- Serbia and Montenegro (1)
- South Africa (1)
- Tunisia (1)
- Ukraine (1)
- United Kingdom (1)
- United States (2)
- Zambia (1)
