= Yuliya Krevsun =

Ukrainian middle-distance runner

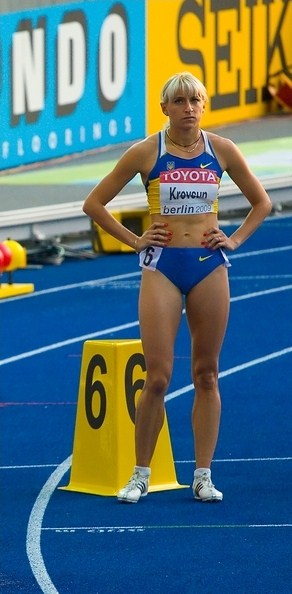
- Krevsun at the 2009 World Championships

Personal information
- Born: Yuliya Gurtovenko; 8 December 1980 (age 45) Vinnytsia, Ukrainian SSR, Soviet Union
Medal record
Women's athletics
Representing Ukraine
European Team Championships
Gold medal – first place	2009 Leiria	800 m
Summer Universiade
Gold medal – first place	2007 Bangkok	800 m
European U23 Championships
Bronze medal – third place	2001 Amsterdam	4x400 m relay
European Junior Championships
Silver medal – second place	1999 Riga	800 m
European Youth Olympic Festival
Bronze medal – third place	1997 Lisbon	800 m

Yuliya Krevsun (nee Gurtovenko; born on 8 December 1980) is a Ukrainian middle-distance running athlete who specialises in the 800 metres. She is a member of Fenerbahçe Athletics club in Turkey.

She won the silver medal at the 1999 European Athletics Junior Championships. In 2002–03 she competed in the European Championships and World Championships but began feeling tired of athletics. She gave up competitive athletics and settled down into family life, giving birth to her first child in 2005. However, in late 2005 she began feeling drawn back to running and started training with Olympic medallist Iryna Lishchynska.

She regained full fitness in 2007 and won silver at the 2007 European Cup and gold at the 2007 Summer Universiade. After a poor performance at the 2007 World Championships, she rebounded in 2008, reaching the 800 metres final at the Beijing Olympics and competing at the World Athletics Final. She won the gold medal at the 2009 European Team Championships in Leiria, and finish fourth in the 800 metres final at the World Championships that year.

== Early life ==
Born in Vinnytsia, Krevsun grew up around the track as her family was heavily involved in sports; her mother Militina Moskvina was an 800 m runner while her father, Yuriy Hurtovenko, was a talented shooter. Initially starting out as a 10 kilometres athlete, she switched to the 800 m in 1997. The family lived in poverty, affecting her athletics career, but she was invited to attend the Donetsk Sport College in 1998 and met Serhiy Krevsun, an amateur boxer, whom she would later marry.

== Junior athletics and family life ==
At her first major junior tournament she won the silver medal, setting a new 800 m personal best of 2:03.81 at the 1999 European Athletics Junior Championships. She competed at the European Athletics U23 Championships in 2001, finishing in fifth place. Krevsun came second at the 2001 national championships, and won the competition in 2002. That year, Krevsun competed at the European Cup (finishing in sixth), and competed at the European Athletics Championships for the first time, but did not progress beyond the heats. She represented Ukraine at the 2003 World Championships, but again lost in the heats. She grew dissatisfied with athletics in the 2003 and 2004 seasons, and she decided to start a family instead; her first son, Danil, was born in 2005. Reflecting on the situation she said "I was dissatisfied and decided to put an end to my athletics career. I wanted a quiet life, romantic dinners with my husband, and a baby’s laugh in our home."

== Return to the track ==
In late 2005 she felt the urge to return athletics, juggling her training and caring for her son. A loss to Nataliya Tobias at the 2006 national championships inspired her to restart her professional career and she began training with Iryna Lishchynska. She was happy with her improving times but suffered a narrow exit in the semi-finals at the 2007 European Athletics Indoor Championships. The outdoor season in 2007 proved to be a turning point however; she took the silver medal at the 2007 European Cup and set new 400 metres and 800 metres personal bests. She ran the 800 m under two minutes for the first time at the national championships, winning in 1.59.60 seconds. Further improvements came shortly afterwards at the 2007 Summer Universiade where she won the gold medal, setting a world-leading time of 1.57.63 seconds. The pressure to compete at the 2007 World Championships as world-leader proved too much for Krevsun, and she was knocked out in the heats with a below-par 2.02.45 minutes. However, at the end of the season she was still the fifth fastest 800 m athlete that year.

After strong performances in the 800 m at the 2008 IAAF Golden League meets, including beating World Champion Janeth Jepkosgei, she gained self-confidence and focused on competing at the 2008 Summer Olympics. She ran a personal best of 1:57.32 in the qualifiers at the Beijing Olympics and reached her first Olympic final, eventually finishing in seventh position in the 800 m final.

She started the 2009 season well with a win at the inaugural European Team Championships, setting a world-leading time of 1:58.62 and fending off fast performances from Yekaterina Kostetskaya, Élodie Guégan and Hannah England. She competed for Ukraine at the 2009 World Championships, finishing fourth in the 800 metres final, although winner Caster Semenya was asked to take a gender test.

== Personal life ==
Krevsun completed a course in foreign economic management at the University of Management and Administrative Department in 2007; her studies enabled her to enter the 2007 Summer Universiade.

== Statistics ==
=== Competition record ===
Year	Competition	Venue	Position	Event	Notes
Representing Ukraine
1999	European Athletics Junior Championships	Riga, Latvia	2nd	800 m	2:03.81
2001	European U23 Championships	Amsterdam, Netherlands	5th	800m	2:08.40
2001	European U23 Championships	Amsterdam, Netherlands	3rd	4 × 400 m relay	3:34.16
2002	European Cup	Annecy, France	6th	800 m	
2002	European Athletics Championships	Munich, Germany	28th (h)	800 m	2:08.04
2003	World Championships	Paris, France	5th (heats)	800 m	2:04.93
2007	European Athletics Indoor Championships	Birmingham, United Kingdom	4th (semis)	800 m	2:01.04
2007	European Cup	Munich, Germany	2nd	800 m	2:01.12
2007	Summer Universiade	Bangkok, Thailand	1st	800 m	1:57.63
2007	World Championships	Osaka, Japan	5th (heats)	800 m	2:02.45
2008	Olympic Games	Beijing, China	7th	800 m	1:58.73
2008	World Athletics Final	Stuttgart, Germany	8th	800 m	2:04.44
2009	European Team Championships	Leiria, Portugal	1st	800 m	1:58.62
2009	World Championships	Berlin, Germany	4th	800 m	1:58.00

=== Personal bests ===
Event	Time	Venue	Date
400 metres	52.45	Kyiv, Ukraine	3 August 2007
800 metres	1:57.32	Beijing, China	16 August 2008
1000 metres	2:41.65	Istanbul, Turkey	3 June 2006
1500 metres (indoors)	4:13.43	Ghent, Belgium	4 February 2007
1500 metres (outdoors)	4:06.50	Yalta, Ukraine	12 June 2012

- All information taken from IAAF profile.
