= 2005 European Athletics U23 Championships – Women's 800 metres =

The women's 800 metres event at the 2005 European Athletics U23 Championships was held in Erfurt, Germany, at Steigerwaldstadion on 15 and 17 July.

== Medalists ==
| Gold | Yevgeniya Zolotova; Russia |
| Silver | Jemma Simpson; United Kingdom |
| Bronze | Élodie Guégan; France |

== Results ==
=== Final ===
17 July

| Rank | Name | Nationality | Time | Notes |
|---|---|---|---|---|
| 1st place, gold medalist(s) | Yevgeniya Zolotova | Russia | 2:06.00 | |
| 2nd place, silver medalist(s) | Jemma Simpson | United Kingdom | 2:06.16 | |
| 3rd place, bronze medalist(s) | Élodie Guégan | France | 2:06.29 | |
| 4 | Marilyn Okoro | United Kingdom | 2:06.39 | |
| 5 | Lucia Klocová | Slovakia | 2:06.40 | |
| 6 | Eleni Filandra | Greece | 2:08.25 | |
| 7 | Aina Valatkevičiūtė | Lithuania | 2:10.53 | |
| | Binnaz Uslu | Turkey | DNS | |

=== Heats ===
Heats were held on 15 July.
Qualified: First 2 in each heat and 2 best to the Final

==== Heat 1 ====
| Rank | Name | Nationality | Time | Notes |
|---|---|---|---|---|
| 1 | Yevgeniya Zolotova | Russia | 2:02.89 | Q |
| 2 | Élodie Guégan | France | 2:03.07 | Q |
| 3 | Rachael Thompson | United Kingdom | 2:05.18 | |
| 4 | Iryna Piachenikava | Belarus | 2:05.55 | |
| 5 | Egle Uljas | Estonia | 2:05.73 | |
| 6 | Charlotte Schönbeck | Sweden | 2:06.74 | |
| 7 | Joanna Kuś | Poland | 2:07.32 | |

==== Heat 2 ====
| Rank | Name | Nationality | Time | Notes |
|---|---|---|---|---|
| 1 | Jemma Simpson | United Kingdom | 2:03.58 | Q |
| 2 | Aina Valatkevičiūtė | Lithuania | 2:04.29 | Q |
| 3 | Eleni Filandra | Greece | 2:04.37 | q |
| 4 | Olena Bondar | Ukraine | 2:04.62 | |
| 5 | Simona Barcău | Romania | 2:05.21 | |
| 6 | Dorota Udałow | Poland | 2:06.21 | |
| 7 | Janina Goldfuss | Germany | 2:07.12 | |

==== Heat 3 ====
| Rank | Name | Nationality | Time | Notes |
|---|---|---|---|---|
| 1 | Lucia Klocová | Slovakia | 2:04.19 | Q |
| 2 | Marilyn Okoro | United Kingdom | 2:04.23 | Q |
| 3 | Binnaz Uslu | Turkey | 2:04.27 | q |
| 4 | Corina Dumbrăvean | Romania | 2:04.62 | |
| 5 | Natallia Kareiva | Belarus | 2:05.00 | |
| 6 | Loredana Di Grazia | Italy | 2:12.01 | |

== Participation ==
According to an unofficial count, 20 athletes from 15 countries participated in the event.

- Belarus (2)
- Estonia (1)
- France (1)
- Germany (1)
- Greece (1)
- Italy (1)
- Lithuania (1)
- Poland (2)
- Romania (2)
- Russia (1)
- Slovakia (1)
- Sweden (1)
- Turkey (1)
- Ukraine (1)
- United Kingdom (3)
