= 2009 European Athletics Indoor Championships – Women's 1500 metres =

Women's 1500 metres event

The Women's 1500 metres event at the 2009 European Athletics Indoor Championships was held on March 6–7.

== Doping ==
Anna Alminova won the event and was awarded the gold medal, but was disqualified in 2014 after the IAAF in 2014 handed her a doping ban caused by abnormalities in her biological passport profile. All her results from 16 February 2009 onwards were annulled.

Natalia Rodríguez (gold), Sonja Roman (silver) and Roísín McGettigan (bronze) received their medals by mail.

== Medalists ==
Gold	Silver	Bronze
Natalia Rodríguez; Spain	Sonja Roman; Slovenia	Roísín McGettigan; Ireland

== Results ==
=== Heats ===
First 3 of each heat (Q) and the next 3 fastest (q) qualified for the final.

Rank	Heat	Name	Nationality	Time	Notes
1	1	Yevgeniya Zolotova	Russia	4:11.31	Q
DQ	2	Anna Alminova	Russia	~~4:11.44~~	Q, Doping
2	2	Natalia Rodríguez	Spain	4:11.73	Q
3	1	Sonja Roman	Slovenia	4:11.75	Q
4	2	Marije te Raa	Netherlands	4:11.80	Q, PB
5	2	Natalya Yevdokimova	Russia	4:11.97	q
6	1	Lidia Chojecka	Poland	4:12.09	Q
7	2	Marina Munćan	Serbia	4:12.23	q, NR
8	2	Roísín McGettigan	Ireland	4:12.25	q
9	1	Sigrid Vanden Bempt	Belgium	4:12.36	NR
10	1	Esther Desviat	Spain	4:12.94	
11	1	Susan Scott	Great Britain	4:13.40	
12	2	Hannah England	Great Britain	4:14.75	
13	1	Ulrika Johansson	Sweden	4:17.65	
14	1	Sandra Teixeira	Portugal	4:18.53	
15	1	Yeliz Kurt	Turkey	4:23.73	PB
16	2	Marcela Lustigová	Czech Republic	4:39.63	

=== Final ===
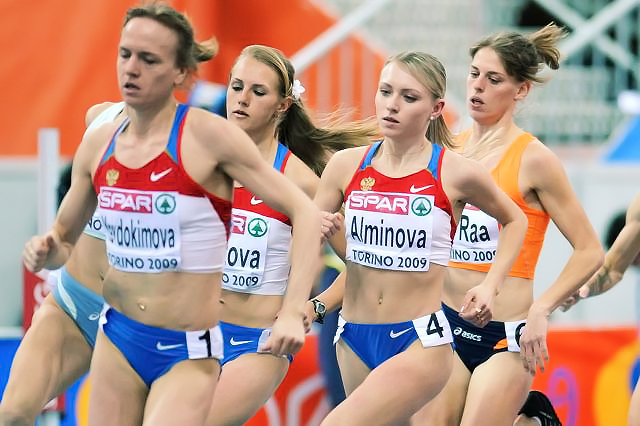
The 1500 metres final

Rank	Name	Nationality	Time	Notes
DQ	Anna Alminova	Russia	~~4:07.76~~	Doping
1st place, gold medalist(s)	Natalia Rodríguez	Spain	4:08.72	
2nd place, silver medalist(s)	Sonja Roman	Slovenia	4:11.42	
3rd place, bronze medalist(s)	Roísín McGettigan	Ireland	4:11.58	
4	Yevgeniya Zolotova	Russia	4:11.72	
5	Natalya Yevdokimova	Russia	4:12.33	
6	Lidia Chojecka	Poland	4:15.90	
7	Marina Munćan	Serbia	4:20.01	
8	Marije te Raa	Netherlands	4:30.93	
