= 2007 European Athletics U23 Championships – Women's 800 metres =

The women's 800 metres event at the 2007 European Athletics U23 Championships was held in Debrecen, Hungary, at Gyulai István Atlétikai Stadion on 12 and 14 July 2007.

== Medalists ==
Gold	Mariya Shapayeva; Russia
Silver	Élodie Guégan; France
Bronze	Vanja Perišić; Croatia

== Results ==
=== Final ===
14 July

Rank	Name	Nationality	Time	Notes
1st place, gold medalist(s)	Mariya Shapayeva	Russia	2:00.86	
2nd place, silver medalist(s)	Élodie Guégan	France	2:01.26	
3rd place, bronze medalist(s)	Vanja Perišić	Croatia	2:01.34	
4	Natallia Kareiva	Belarus	2:01.42	
5	Charlotte Best	United Kingdom	2:02.72	
6	Laura Finucane	United Kingdom	2:03.07	
7	Yekaterina Martynova	Russia	2:03.50	
8	Lenka Masná	Czech Republic	2:04.17	

=== Heats ===
12 July
Qualified: first 2 in each heat and 2 best to the Final

==== Heat 1 ====
Rank	Name	Nationality	Time	Notes
1	Mariya Shapayeva	Russia	2:01.49	Q
2	Laura Finucane	United Kingdom	2:02.82	Q
3	Lenka Masná	Czech Republic	2:04.89	q
4	Nataliya Lupu	Ukraine	2:08.81	
5	Elin Wiik	Sweden	2:09.29	

==== Heat 2 ====
Rank	Name	Nationality	Time	Notes
1	Vanja Perišić	Croatia	2:03.89	Q
2	Natallia Kareiva	Belarus	2:04.19	Q
3	Anna Luchkina	Russia	2:05.10	
4	Agnieszka Sowińska	Poland	2:05.96	
5	Cyndie Sabattini	France	2:07.04	
6	Simona Barcău	Romania	2:09.77	

==== Heat 3 ====
Rank	Name	Nationality	Time	Notes
1	Élodie Guégan	France	2:03.60	Q
2	Charlotte Best	United Kingdom	2:04.02	Q
3	Yekaterina Martynova	Russia	2:04.50	q
4	Tatsiana Suprun	Belarus	2:07.02	
5	Liina Tšernov	Estonia	2:09.46	
6	Andrea Bolyki	Hungary	2:09.67	

== Participation ==
According to an unofficial count, 17 athletes from 12 countries participated in the event.

- Belarus (2)
- Croatia (1)
- Czech Republic (1)
- Estonia (1)
- France (2)
- Hungary (1)
- Poland (1)
- Romania (1)
- Russia (3)
- Sweden (1)
- Ukraine (1)
- United Kingdom (2)
