= 2008 IAAF World Indoor Championships – Women's 1500 metres =

== Medalists ==
The original medalists were the following.

Gold
Yelena Soboleva	Russia
Silver
Yuliya Fomenko	Russia
Bronze
Gelete Burka	Ethiopia

After the disqualification of the Russian women, the medalists were the following.

Gold
Gelete Burka	Ethiopia
Silver
Maryam Yusuf Jamal	Bahrain
Bronze
Daniela Yordanova	Bulgaria

== Heats ==
Heat	Pos	Name	Country	Mark	Q
1	1	Maryam Yusuf Jamal	Bahrain	4:07.43	Q
1	2	Yelena Soboleva	Russia	4:07.85	Q
1	3	Gelete Burka	Ethiopia	4:08.24	Q
1	4	Daniela Yordanova	Bulgaria	4:08.44 SB	q
1	5	Susan Scott	United Kingdom	4:10.39	
1	6	Christin Wurth-Thomas	United States	4:10.56 PB	
1	7	Nataliya Tobias	Ukraine	4:11.71	
1	8	Mari Järvenpää	Finland	4:13.24 NR	
1	9	Elena Antoci	Romania	4:13.93	
1	10	Esther Desviat	Spain	4:33.71	
2	1	Yuliya Fomenko	Russia	4:05.94	Q
2	2	Liliana Popescu	Romania	4:06.68	Q
2	3	Sonja Roman	Slovenia	4:08.12 SB	Q
2	4	Bouchra Ghézielle	France	4:08.83	q
2	5	Siham Hilali	Morocco	4:10.09 PB	q
2	6	Jemma Simpson	United Kingdom	4:11.17 PB	
2	7	Jenelle Deatherage	United States	4:14.27 SB	
2	8	Kajsa Haglund	Sweden	4:14.82 PB	
2	9	Hilary Stellingwerff	Canada	4:18.26	
2	10	Sandra Teixeira	Portugal	4:23.14	

== Final ==
Pos	Name	Country	Mark
Gold medal	Gelete Burka	Ethiopia	3:59.75 AR
Silver medal	Maryam Yusuf Jamal	Bahrain	3:59.79 AR
Bronze medal	Daniela Yordanova	Bulgaria	4:04.19 NR
4	Liliana Popescu	Romania	4:07.61
5	Siham Hilali	Morocco	4:15.54
	Yelena Soboleva	Russia	DQ
	Yuliya Fomenko	Russia	DQ
	Bouchra Ghézielle	France	DQ
	Sonja Roman	Slovenia	DNF

Intermediate	Athlete	Country	Mark
200m	Yelena Soboleva	Russia	30.95
400m	Yelena Soboleva	Russia	1:03.26
600m	Yelena Soboleva	Russia	1:35.66
800m	Yuliya Fomenko	Russia	2:07.89
1000m	Yuliya Fomenko	Russia	2:39.90
1200m	Yuliya Fomenko	Russia	3:11.53
1400m	Yuliya Fomenko	Russia	3:42.27
