= Eintracht-Stadion =

Football stadium in Braunschweig, Germany

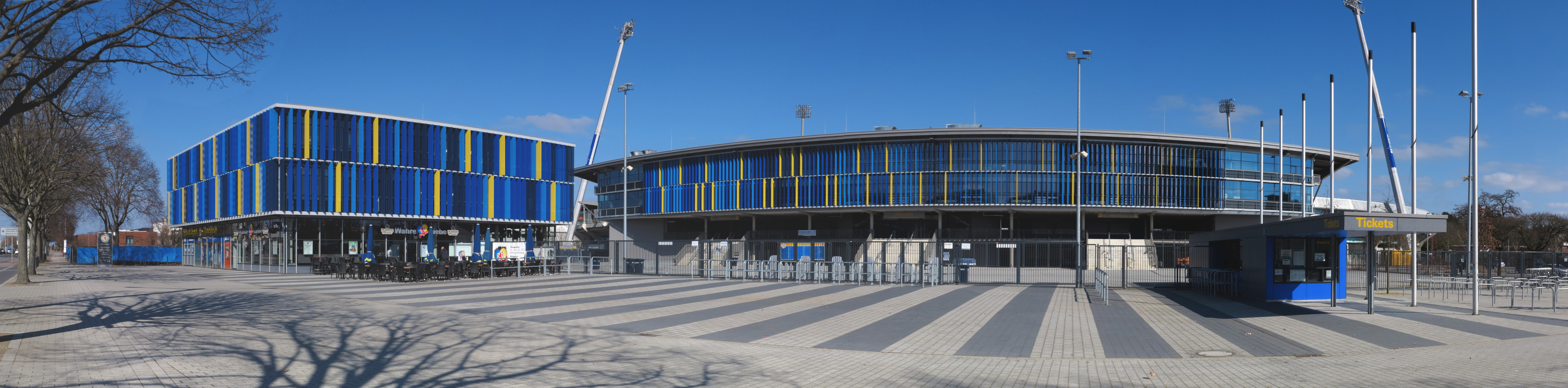
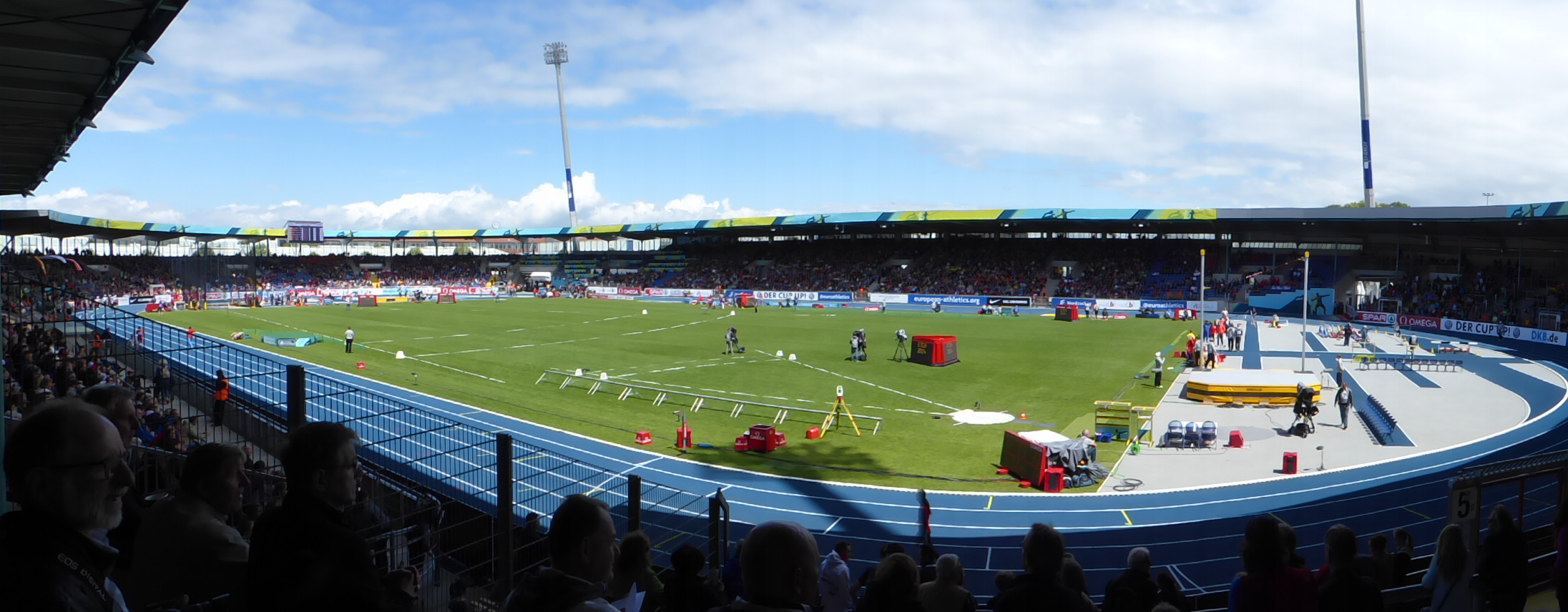
- Interactive map of Eintracht-Stadion
- Full name: Eintracht-Stadion
- Former names: Städtisches Stadion an der Hamburger Straße (1982–2008)
- Location: Braunschweig, Germany
- Coordinates: 52°17′24″N 10°31′18″E
- Owner: Stadthalle Braunschweig Betriebsgesellschaft mbH
- Capacity: 24,406; 23,325 (football matches)
- Surface: Grass

Construction
- Built: 1922 to 1923
- Opened: 17 June 1923; 103 years ago
- Renovated: 1963–1964, 1995, 2009–2010, 2011–2013
- Cost: 15 Million EUR ^{(2009)}

Tenant
- Eintracht Braunschweig (1923–present)

Eintracht-Stadion (German pronunciation: [ˈaɪntʁaxtˌʃtaːdi̯ɔn]) is a multi-purpose stadium in Braunschweig, Germany. It is currently used for football and American football matches and is the home stadium of Eintracht Braunschweig and the New Yorker Lions. The stadium is able to hold 24,406 people and was built in 1923.

== History ==
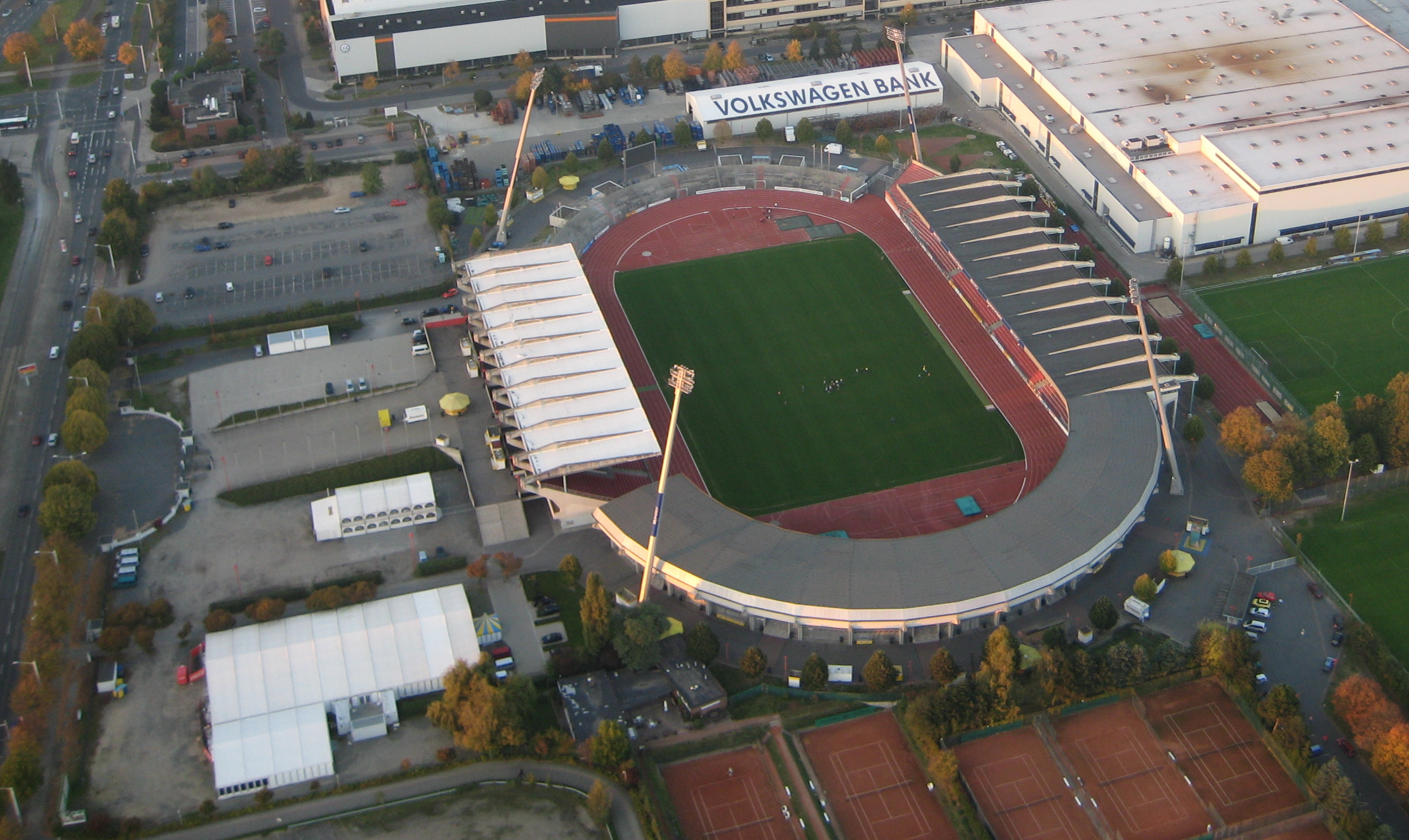
Aerial view before the 2009–13 reconstruction.

Up to the early 1920s, Eintracht Braunschweig played its home games at Sportplatz an der Helmstedter Straße, which held 3,000 people. The need for a bigger stadium lead to the construction of the Eintracht-Stadion, located at the Hamburger Straße in the northern part of the city, one of Braunschweig's main arterial roads, in 1923. The new stadium was opened on 17 June 1923 with a friendly against 1. FC Nürnberg. In 1955, the Eintracht-Stadion hosted the final of the DFB-Pokal, the German Football Association Cup, between Karlsruher SC and FC Schalke 04. Karlsruhe won the match 3–2.

Originally, the stadium held up to 24,000 people, but with the introduction of Germany's new nationwide Bundesliga in 1963, the capacity was increased to accommodate 38,000 spectators.

In 1981, financial difficulties forced the club to sell the stadium to the city of Braunschweig. Subsequently, the stadium's official name was changed into Städtisches Stadion an der Hamburger Straße ("Municipal Stadium Hamburger Straße"). The stadium was renovated again in 1995, reducing the capacity to 25,000.

In 2008, a group of local companies bought the naming rights to the stadium from the city and changed the name back into the original Eintracht-Stadion.

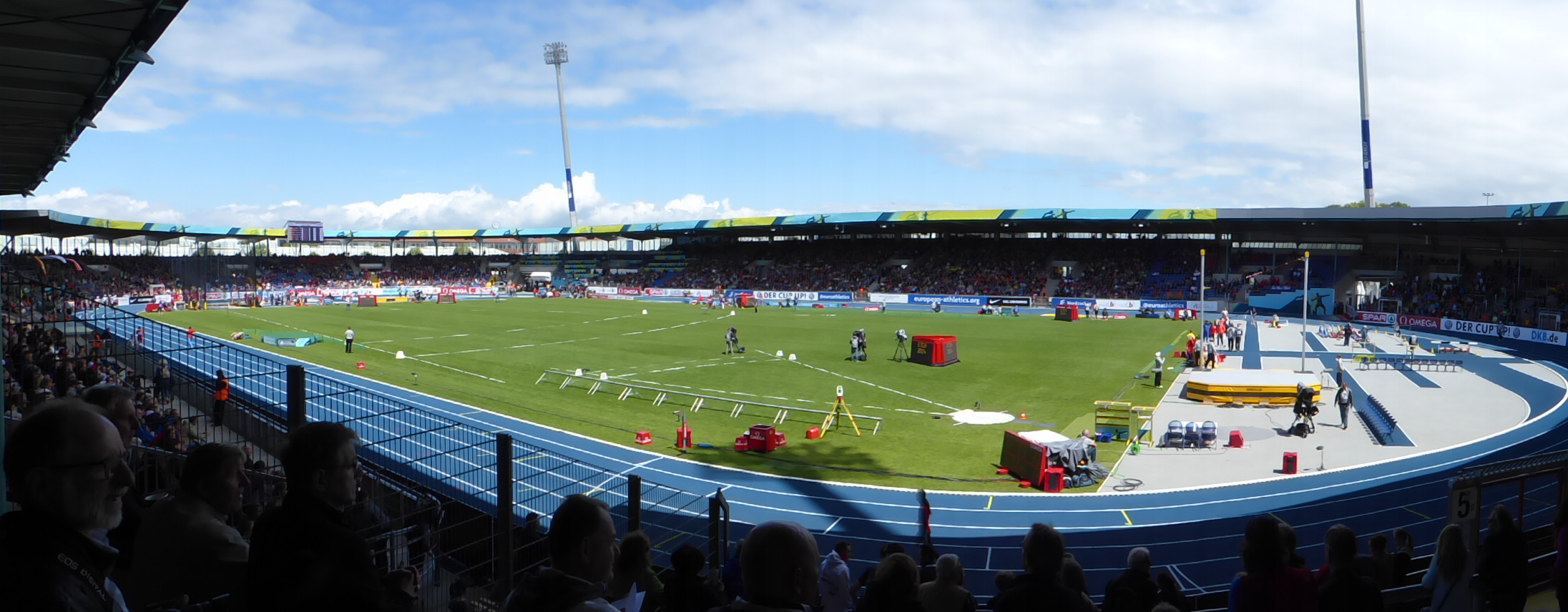
Eintracht-Stadion during the European Team Championships in 2014.

From 2009 until 2010 the northern stand was roofed and expanded. From 2011 until 2013, the stadium was under reconstruction again, this time the main stand was modernized. The stadium's official capacity was reduced from 25,540 to 24,406.

== Athletics ==
The Eintracht-Stadion, which is one of the few remaining stadia with a running track in German professional football, is also used as a venue for athletics.

The stadium hosted the German Athletics Championships in 2000, 2004, and 2010. In 2012, the European Athletic Association awarded Braunschweig the 2014 European Team Championships.

== Concert venue ==
Since 1998, Eintracht-Stadion has also been used as an outdoor concert venue. The first open-air concert at the ground was performed by Eros Ramazzotti on 3 June 1998.

== Gallery ==
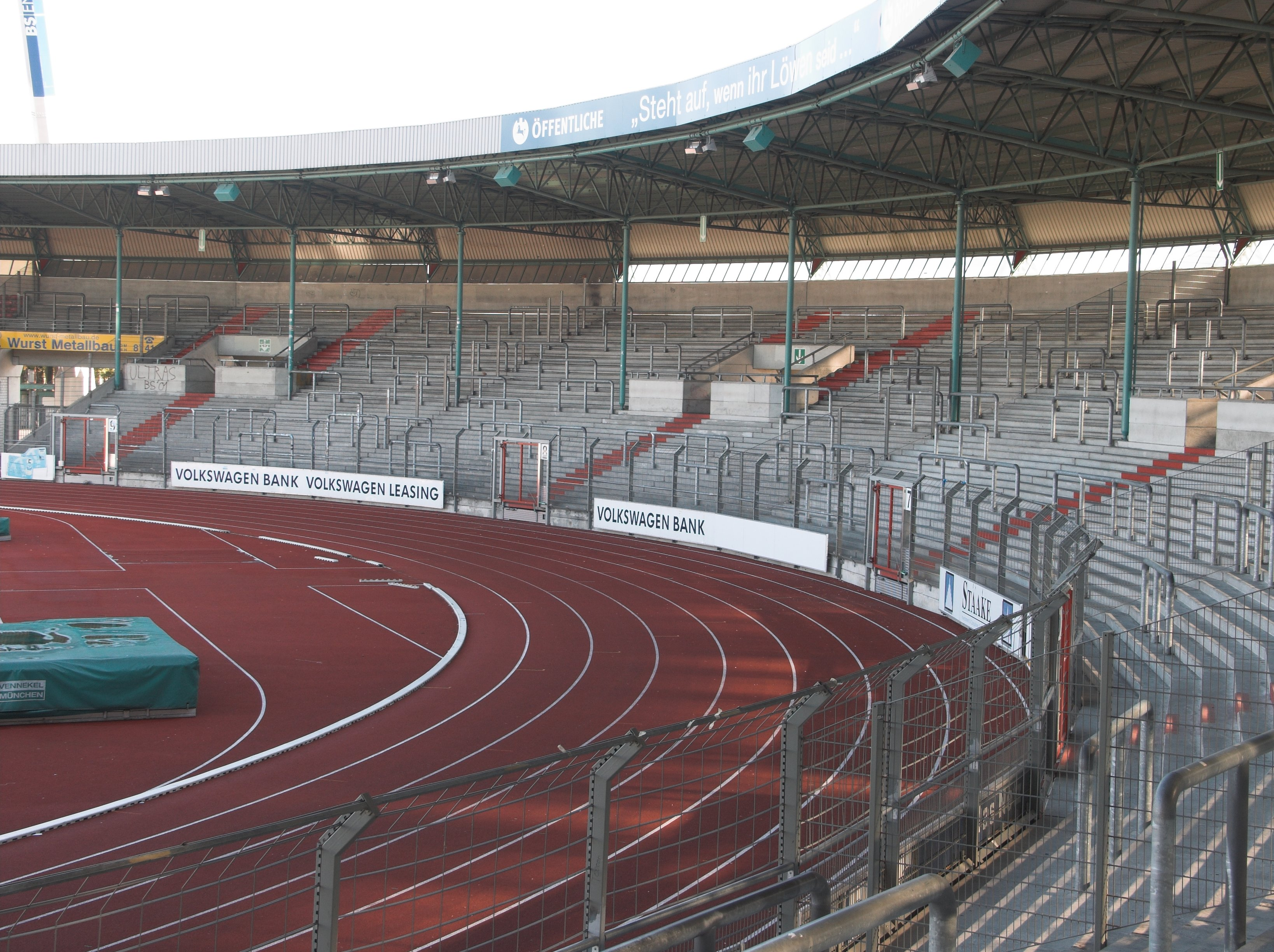
South stand

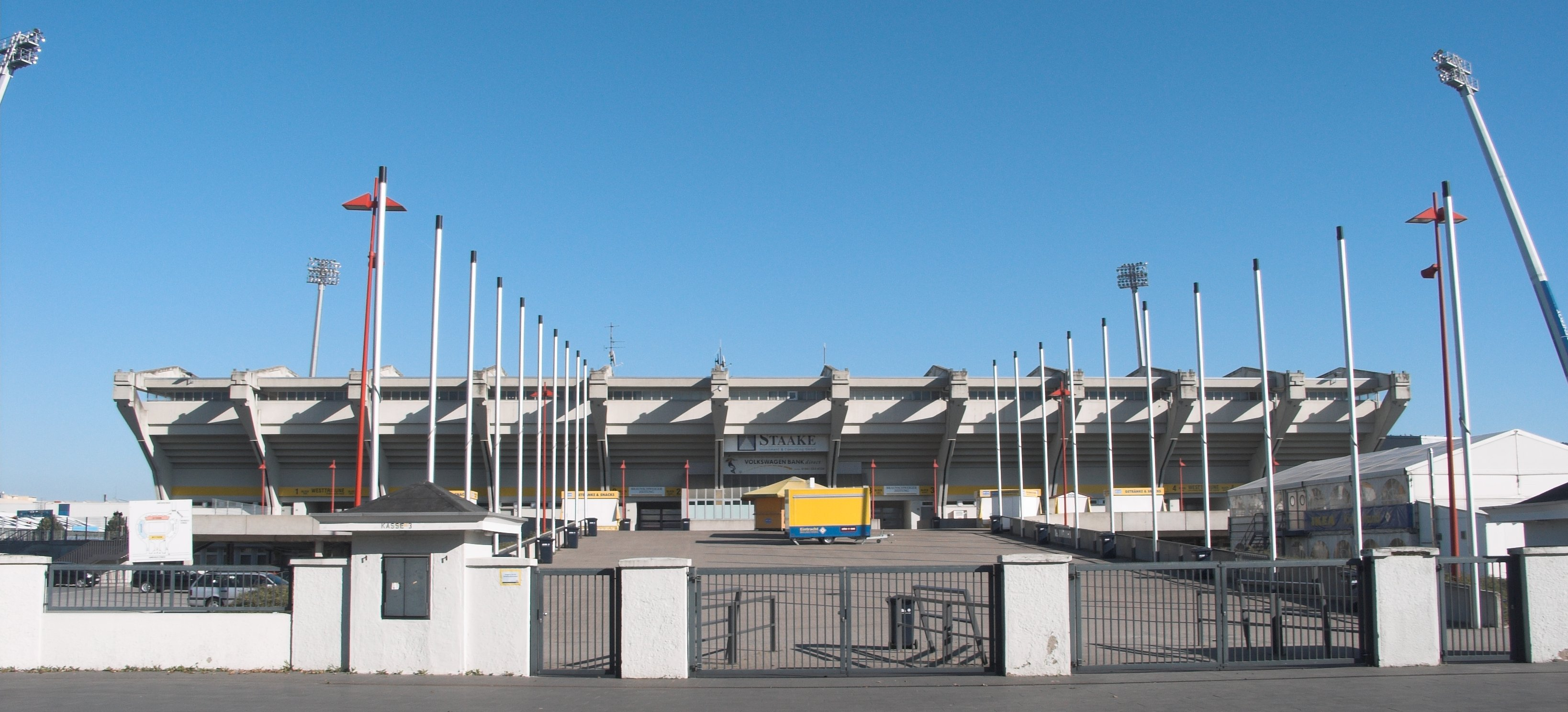
Eintracht-Stadion from the outside in 2006.

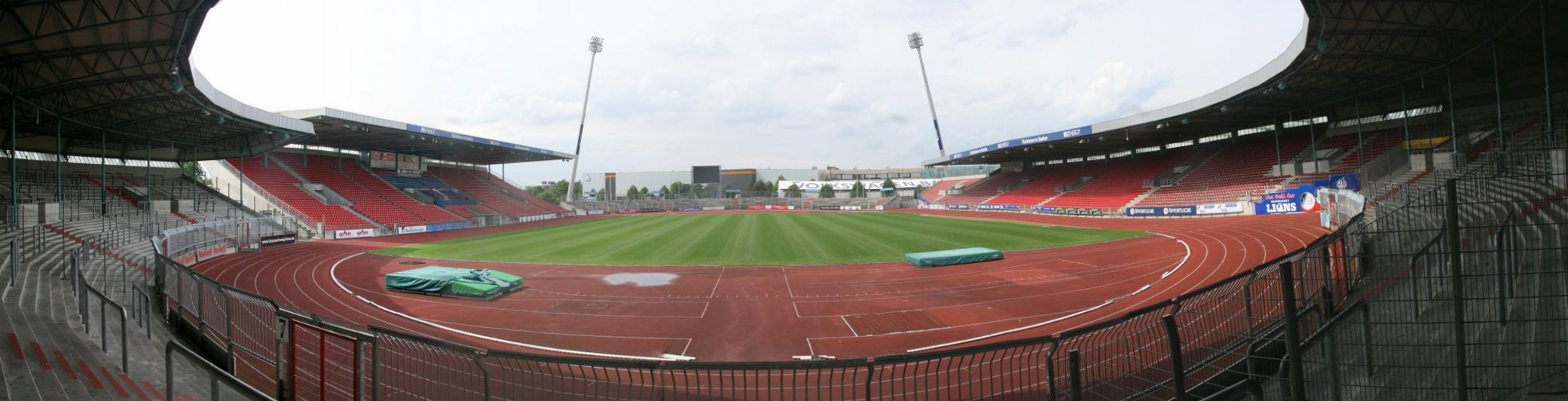
Eintracht-Stadion, before the construction of the new north stand in 2010.

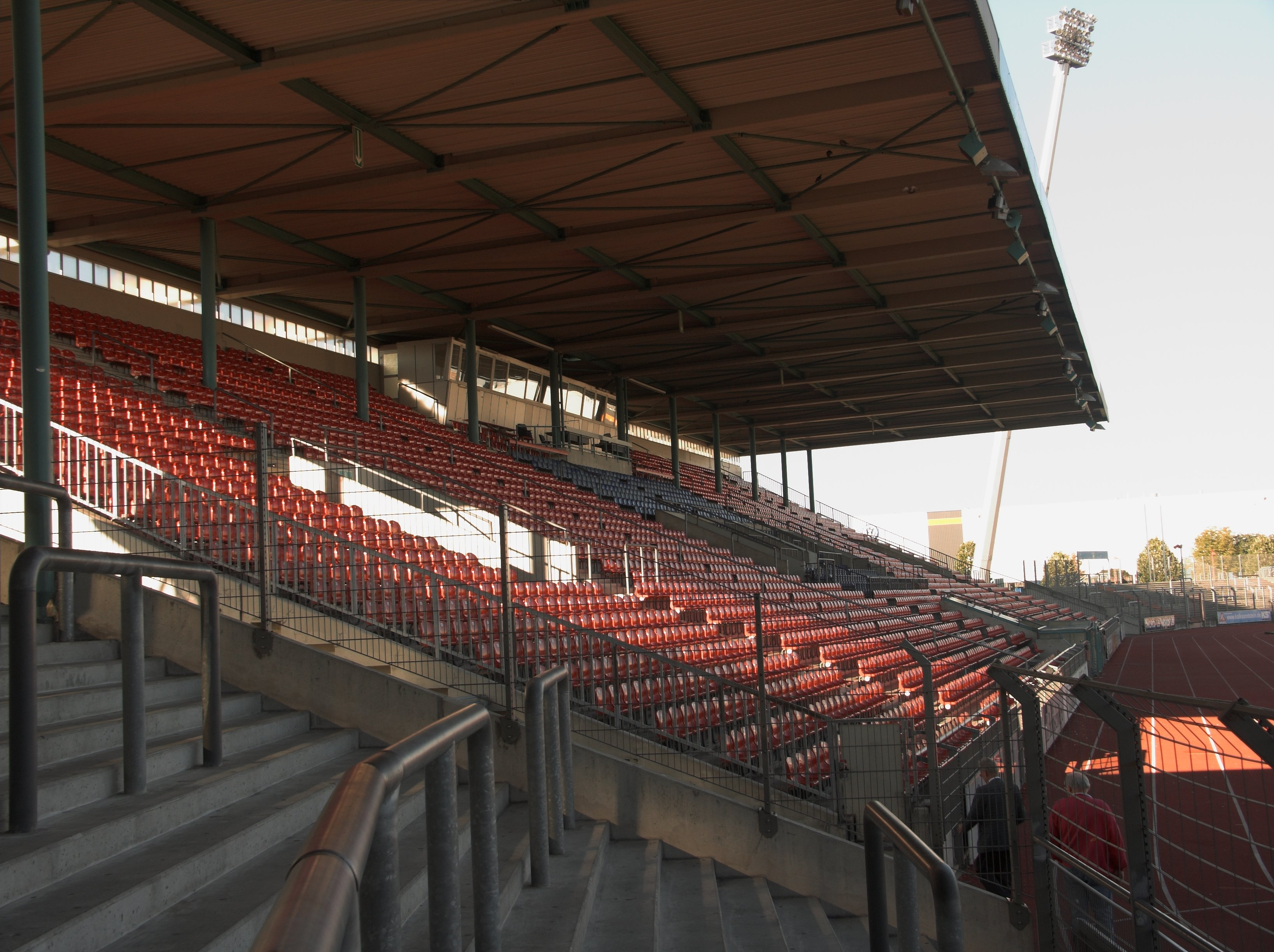
Main stand before the 2012–13 reconstruction.

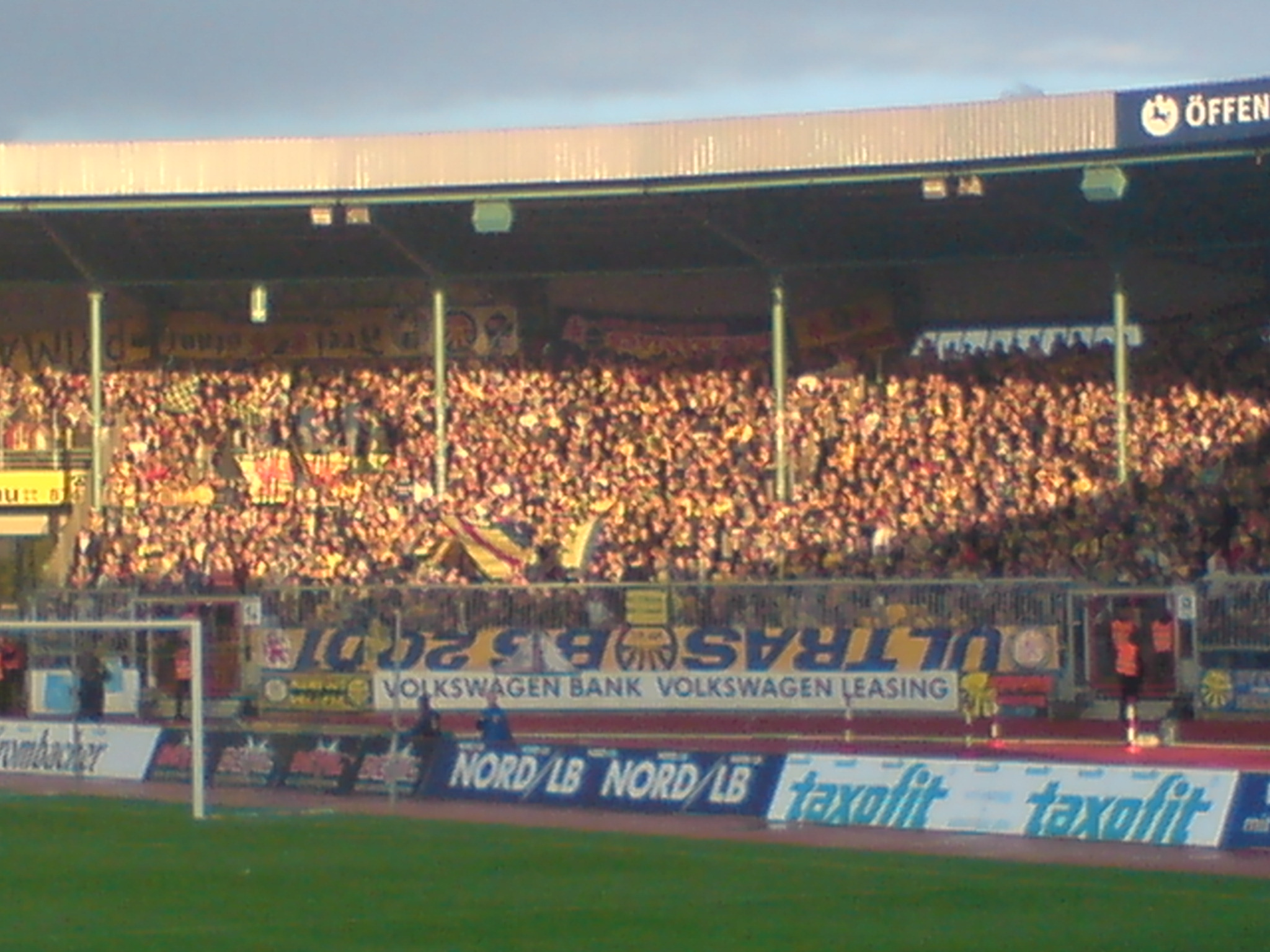
Eintracht Braunschweig supporters on the south stand in 2007.
