= Siham Hilali =

Moroccan middle-distance runner

Medal record

Women's athletics

Representing Morocco

Mediterranean Games
Gold medal – first place	2013 Mersin	1500 m
Silver medal – second place	2013 Mersin	800 m

Pan Arab Games
Silver medal – second place	2011 Doha	1500 m

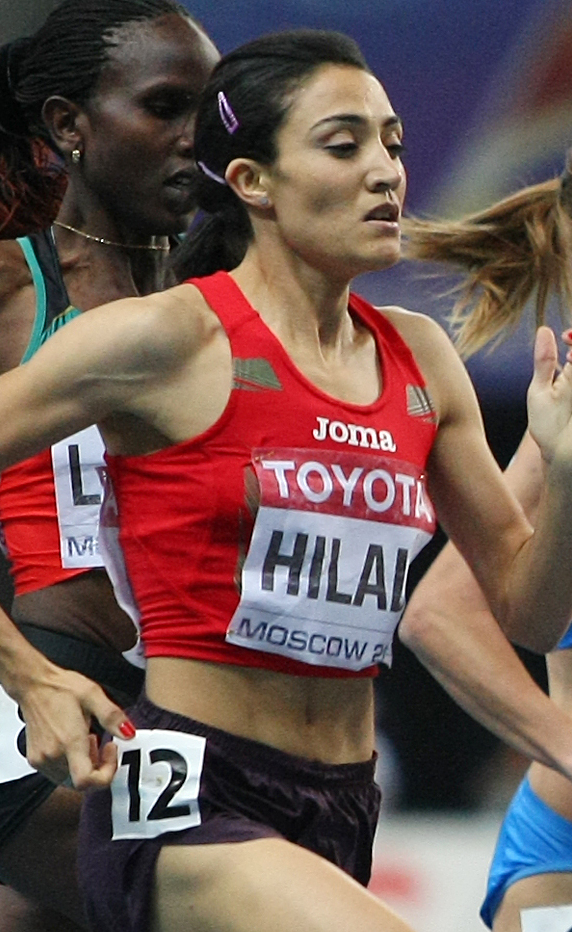
Hilali in 2013

Siham Hilali (born 2 May 1986 in Khouribga) is a Moroccan middle-distance runner who specializes in the 1500 metres. In addition to numerous top international competitions, she represented her country at the 2008, 2012 and 2016 Summer Olympics.

== Achievements ==
Year	Competition	Venue	Position	Event	Notes
Representing Morocco
2003	World Youth Championships	Sherbrooke, Canada	1st	3000 m	9:12.70
2004	World Junior Championships	Grosseto, Italy	3rd	1500 m	4:17.39
2004	World Junior Championships	Grosseto, Italy	3rd	3000 m	9:03.16 (PB)
2007	World Athletics Final	Stuttgart, Germany	8th	1500 m	4:16.51
2007	World Championships	Osaka, Japan	31st (h)	1500 m	4:22.12
2008	World Indoor Championships	Valencia, Spain	5th	1500 m	4:15.54
2008	Olympic Games	Beijing, China	10th	1500 m	4:05.57
2009	Mediterranean Games	Pescara, Italy	4th	1500 m	4:12.83
2009	World Championships	Berlin, Germany	29th (h)	1500 m	4:10.57
2009	Jeux de la Francophonie	Beirut, Lebanon	2nd	1500 m	4:21.56
2010	African Championships	Nairobi, Kenya	11th	1500 m	4:20.98
2011	World Championships	Daegu, South Korea	16th (sf)	1500 m	4:09.64
2011	Pan Arab Games	Doha, Qatar	2nd	1500 m	4:20.83
2012	World Indoor Championships	Istanbul, Turkey	11th (h)	1500 m	4:11.69
2012	Olympic Games	London, United Kingdom	14th (sf)	1500 m	4:04.79
2013	Mediterranean Games	Mersin, Turkey	2nd	800 m	2:00.79
2013	Mediterranean Games	Mersin, Turkey	1st	1500 m	4:04.06
2013	World Championships	Moscow, Russia	11th	1500 m	4:09.16
2013	Jeux de la Francophonie	Nice, France	4th	800 m	2:03.73
2013	Jeux de la Francophonie	Nice, France	2nd	1500 m	4:18.89
2013	Islamic Solidarity Games	Palembang, Indonesia	2nd	800 m	2:07.29
2013	Islamic Solidarity Games	Palembang, Indonesia	2nd	1500 m	4:19.79
2014	World Indoor Championships	Sopot, Poland	4th	1500 m	4:07.62
2014	African Championships	Marrakesh, Morocco	–	800 m	DNF
2015	World Championships	Beijing, China	—	1500 m	DNF
2016	African Championships	Durban, South Africa	5th	1500 m	4:07.39
2016	Olympic Games	Rio de Janeiro, Brazil	33rd (h)	1500 m	4:13.46
2017	Islamic Solidarity Games	Baku, Azerbaijan	5th	1500 m	4:23.66
2017	Jeux de la Francophonie	Abidjan, Ivory Coast	3rd	800 m	2:02.40
2017	Jeux de la Francophonie	Abidjan, Ivory Coast	3rd	1500 m	4:18.87

== Personal bests ==
Outdoor

- 800 metres – 2:02.04 min (2011)
- 1500 metres – 4:01.33 min (2011)
- 3000 metres – 9:03.16 min (2004)
- 3000 metres steeplechase – 8:18.11 min (2006)

Indoor

- 1500 metres – 4:10.09 min (2008)
- 3000 metres – 8:59.60 min (2011)
