= 1996 World Junior Championships in Athletics – Women's 800 metres =

The women's 800 metres event at the 1996 World Junior Championships in Athletics was held in Sydney, Australia, at International Athletic Centre on 21, 22 and 23 August.

== Medalists ==
Gold	Claudia Gesell; Germany
Silver	Kathleen Friedrich; Germany
Bronze	Nancy Jebet Langat; Kenya

== Results ==
=== Final ===
23 August

Rank	Name	Nationality	Time	Notes
1st place, gold medalist(s)	Claudia Gesell	Germany	2:02.67	
2nd place, silver medalist(s)	Kathleen Friedrich	Germany	2:02.70	
3rd place, bronze medalist(s)	Nancy Jebet Langat	Kenya	2:03.21	
4	Mairelín Fuentes	Cuba	2:03.49	
5	Anca Safta	Romania	2:03.64	
6	Rhode Senekal-Snyman	South Africa	2:04.59	
7	Marilena Zevedeanu	Romania	2:08.19	
8	Natalya Yevdokimova	Ukraine	2:10.77	

=== Semifinals ===
22 August

==== Semifinal 1 ====
Rank	Name	Nationality	Time	Notes
1	Anca Safta	Romania	2:05.99	Q
2	Kathleen Friedrich	Germany	2:06.08	Q
3	Mairelín Fuentes	Cuba	2:06.73	Q
4	Natalya Yevdokimova	Ukraine	2:07.54	Q
5	Tytti Reho	Finland	2:07.67	
6	Laetitia Valdonado	France	2:09.34	
7	Oksana Zbrozhek	Russia	2:12.58	
	Shura Hotesa	Ethiopia	DQ	IAAF rule 141.2

==== Semifinal 2 ====
Rank	Name	Nationality	Time	Notes
1	Claudia Gesell	Germany	2:06.23	Q
2	Nancy Jebet Langat	Kenya	2:06.79	Q
3	Marilena Zevedeanu	Romania	2:07.22	Q
4	Rhode Senekal-Snyman	South Africa	2:07.40	Q
5	Miriam Maseková	Slovakia	2:07.65	
6	Tara Mendoza	United States	2:08.95	
7	Hasna Benhassi	Morocco	2:25.00	
	Sintayahu Fikre	Ethiopia	DNS	

=== Heats ===
21 August

==== Heat 1 ====
Rank	Name	Nationality	Time	Notes
1	Nancy Jebet Langat	Kenya	2:08.02	Q
2	Tytti Reho	Finland	2:08.48	Q
3	Rhode Senekal-Snyman	South Africa	2:08.50	Q
4	Bi Tanna	China	2:08.82	
5	Natalia Rodríguez	Spain	2:09.09	
6	Lena Nilsson	Sweden	2:09.12	
7	Cherryl Escat	Philippines	2:14.63	
8	Zolveik Ruíz	Panama	2:19.11	

==== Heat 2 ====
Rank	Name	Nationality	Time	Notes
1	Anca Safta	Romania	2:06.24	Q
2	Mairelín Fuentes	Cuba	2:06.25	Q
3	Laetitia Valdonado	France	2:07.46	Q
4	Oksana Zbrozhek	Russia	2:08.42	q
5	Natalya Yevdokimova	Ukraine	2:08.80	q
6	Tamieka Grizzle	United States	2:11.48	
7	Alli Li Yin Yee	Hong Kong	2:15.49	

==== Heat 3 ====
Rank	Name	Nationality	Time	Notes
1	Miriam Maseková	Slovakia	2:08.75	Q
2	Kathleen Friedrich	Germany	2:09.17	Q
3	Sintayahu Fikre	Ethiopia	2:10.27	Q
4	Margaret Chirchir	Kenya	2:10.34	
5	Marie-Louise Henning	South Africa	2:10.90	
6	Melanie Bradley	Australia	2:11.12	
7	Zhang Jinqing	China	2:14.04	

==== Heat 4 ====
Rank	Name	Nationality	Time	Notes
1	Claudia Gesell	Germany	2:05.66	Q
2	Shura Hotesa	Ethiopia	2:06.57	Q
3	Hasna Benhassi	Morocco	2:07.12	Q
4	Tara Mendoza	United States	2:07.56	q
5	Marilena Zevedeanu	Romania	2:08.43	q
6	Jelena Stanisavljevic	Yugoslavia	2:09.88	
7	Sonja Roman	Slovenia	2:10.63	

== Participation ==
According to an unofficial count, 29 athletes from 22 countries participated in the event.

- Australia (1)
- China (2)
- Cuba (1)
- Ethiopia (2)
- Finland (1)
- France (1)
- Germany (2)
- Hong Kong (1)
- Kenya (2)
- Morocco (1)
- Panama (1)
- Philippines (1)
- Romania (2)
- Russia (1)
- Slovakia (1)
- Slovenia (1)
- South Africa (2)
- Spain (1)
- Sweden (1)
- Ukraine (1)
- United States (2)
- Yugoslavia (1)
