= Athletics at the 2011 Summer Universiade – Women's 4 × 400 metres relay =

The women's 4 x 400 metres relay event at the 2011 Summer Universiade was held on 21 August.

== Results ==
Rank	Nation	Athletes	Time	Notes
1st place, gold medalist(s)	Russia	Marina Karnaushchenko, Yelena Migunova, Kseniya Ustalova, Olga Topilskaya	3:27.16	
2nd place, silver medalist(s)	Turkey	Nagihan Karadere, Merve Aydın, Meliz Redif, Pınar Saka	3:30.14	
3rd place, bronze medalist(s)	Great Britain	Kelly Massey, Charlotte Best, Meghan Beesley, Emily Diamond	3:33.09	
4	China	Ruan Zhuofen, Zheng Zhihui, Yang Qi, Chen Jingwen	3:34.09	
5	South Africa	Wenda Theron, Alet van Wyk, Sonja van der Merwe, Rorisang Ramonnye	3:34.59	
6	Switzerland	Angela Klinger, Jessica Martins, Nora Farrag, Valentine Arrieta	3:37.82	
7	Senegal	Fatoumata Diop, Fatou Diabaye, Marietou Badji, Mame Fatou Faye	3:43.15	
	Kazakhstan		DNS	
	United States		DNS	
