= Mapaseka Makhanya =

South African runner (born 1985)

Personal information
- Nationality: South African
- Born: 9 April 1985 (age 40) South Africa

Sport
- Sport: marathon race

Mapaseka Makhanya (born 9 April 1985) is a South African middle- and long-distance runner who specializes in the marathon race, formerly in the 800 and 1500 metres.

== Early career ==
Makhanya began her international career representing South Africa at youth and junior levels. She competed at the 2001 World Youth Championships and the 2004 World Junior Championships without reaching the final, and placed lowly at the 2011 and 2013 World Cross Country Championships (83rd and 86th). She finished eleventh in the 1500 metres at the 2007 All-Africa Games and sixth in the 800 metres at the 2010 African Championships. She also competed at the 2007 Summer Universiade without reaching the final.

== Transition to Road Racing ==
Makhanya shifted to road races from 2013 on, making her marathon debut in Johannesburg the same year. In 2015, she finished third at the Hannover Marathon in a time of 2:31:02 hours.

== Personal Bests ==
Her personal best times are

- 800 metres – 2:03.36 min (2010)
- 1500 metres – 4:08.18 min (2010)
- 3000 metres – 9:08.87 min (2013)
- 3000 metres steeplechase – 10:58.20 min (2004)
- 5000 metres– 15:53.61 min (2013)
- Half marathon – 1:12:43 hrs (2017)
- Marathon – 2:31:02 hrs (2015).

In 2013 she became South African Sportswoman of the Year.

== Honours and awards ==
- South African Sportswoman of the Year (2013) – Honoured at the annual South African Sports Awards for her exceptional.
- SPAR Grand Prix Series Winner (2014) – Secured the overall title in the national SPAR Women’s 10 km Challenge Grand Prix Series by consistently achieving top finishes across multiple races held throughout South Africa.
- SPAR Women’s 10 km Challenge (Cape Town, 2015) – Claimed victory in the Cape Town leg of the series with a time of 32:54, establishing a new course record.
