= Sonja Roman =

Slovenian middle-distance runner

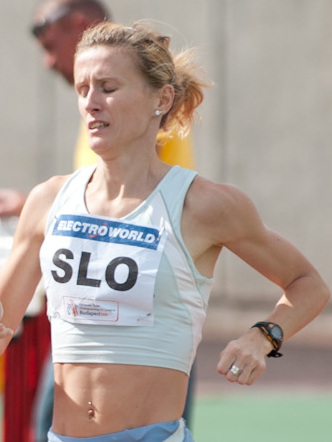

Medal record

Representing Slovenia

Women's Athletics

European Indoor Championships
Silver medal – second place	2009 Turin	1500 m

Sonja Roman (11 March 1979 in Hodoš) is a Slovenian middle distance runner who specializes in the 1500 metres. She is the national record holder (4:02,13 in Rome 2009) in the event.

She finished seventh at the 2007 European Indoor Championships and won the bronze medal at the 2009 European Indoor Championships. She also competed at the European Championships in 2002 and 2006, the World Indoor Championships in 2003, 2004, 2006 and 2008, the European Indoor Championships in 2005, the World Championships in 2007 and the 2008 Olympic Games without reaching the final round.

She won the 1500 m title in the First Division section of the 2009 European Team Championships and also took the 3000 m silver medal. She represented Slovenia in the 1500 m at the 2009 World Championships in Athletics and reached the semi-finals. She was ninth in the event at the 2009 IAAF World Athletics Final.

Roman won the Amora Cross in Lisbon in November 2010, but said the race was not preparation for the 2010 European Cross Country Championships, but rather for the 2011 European Athletics Indoor Championships.

== Competition record ==
Year	Competition	Venue	Position	Event	Notes
Representing Slovenia
1996	World Junior Championships	Sydney, Australia	22nd (sf)	800 m	2:10.63
1996	World Junior Championships	Sydney, Australia	15th (h)	1500 m	4:26.14
1997	European Junior Championships	Ljubljana, Slovenia	7th	1500 m	4:27.56
1997	European Cross Country Championships	Oeiras, Portugal	6th	Junior race (2.8 km)	9:22
1998	World Junior Championships	Annecy, France	13th (sf)	800 m	2:08.10
1998	World Junior Championships	Annecy, France	18th (h)	1500 m	4:27.11
1998	European Cross Country Championships	Ferrara, Italy	7th	Junior race (3.6 km)	12:20
1999	European U23 Championships	Gothenburg, Sweden	7th (h)	800 m	2:04.06
2001	European U23 Championships	Amsterdam, Netherlands	12th	1500 m	4:19.86
2002	European Championships	Munich, Germany	30th (h)	1500 m	4:19.87
2003	World Indoor Championships	Birmingham, United Kingdom	22nd (h)	1500 m	4:18.09
2003	Universiade	Daegu, South Korea	12th (h)	800 m	2:05.24
2003	Universiade	Daegu, South Korea	11th	1500 m	4:16.20
2004	World Indoor Championships	Budapest, Hungary	11th (h)	1500 m	4:11.72
2005	European Indoor Championships	Madrid, Spain	11th (h)	1500 m	4:16.44
2005	Mediterranean Games	Almería, Spain	14th (h)	1500 m	4:19.67
2005	Universiade	İzmir, Turkey	9th	1500 m	4:18.71
2006	World Indoor Championships	Moscow, Russia	17th (h)	1500 m	4:27.96
2006	European Championships	Gothenburg, Sweden	22nd (h)	1500 m	4:13.59
2007	European Indoor Championships	Birmingham, United Kingdom	7th	1500 m	4:11.57
2007	World Championships	Osaka, Japan	10th (h)	1500 m	4:08.60
2008	World Indoor Championships	Valencia, Spain	5th (h)	1500 m	4:08.12
2008	Olympic Games	Beijing, China	15th (h)	1500 m	4:08.52
2009	European Indoor Championships	Turin, Italy	2nd	1500 m	4:11.42
2009	World Championships	Berlin, Germany	10th (h)	1500 m	4:07.10
2012	European Championships	Helsinki, Finland	20th (h)	1500 m	4:16.68
2012	Olympic Games	London, United Kingdom	40th (h)	1500 m	4:19.17
2013	World Championships	Moscow, Russia	18th (sf)	1500 m	4:08.63
2014	European Championships	Zurich, Switzerland	19th (h)	1500 m	4:16.38
2015	European Indoor Championships	Prague, Czech Republic	10th	1500 m	4:20.85
2015	European Indoor Championships	Prague, Czech Republic	–	3000 m	DNF

== Personal bests ==
- 800 metres - 2:02.47 min (2003)
- 1500 metres - 4:02,13 min (2009)
- 1500 metres - 4:06.75 min (2007, indoor)
- 3000 metres - 8:54.24 min (2008, indoor)
