= Liliana Popescu =

Romanian middle-distance runner

Liliana Popescu, née Barbulescu (born 5 February 1982) is a Romanian middle distance runner, who specializes in the 800 metres.

== Career ==
Her personal best is 1:59.34 minutes, achieved in May 2008 in Bucharest. She has 4:00.35 minutes in the 1500 metres, also achieved in May 2008 in Bucharest. She was removed from the Olympic squad prior to the 2008 Summer Olympics, as she failed a doping test for Erythropoietin (EPO) in May. She received a two-year ban from the sport from May 2008 to May 2010.

Popescu ran in the series of the 1500 m at the 2010 European Athletics Championships, but did not finish the race.

== Achievements ==
Year	Competition	Venue	Position	Event	Notes
Representing Romania
1999	World Youth Championships	Bydgoszcz, Poland	5th	800 m	2:11.97
2000	World Junior Championships	Santiago, Chile	3rd	4 × 400 m relay	3:34.49
2003	Universiade	Daegu, South Korea	1st	800 m	2:00.06
2008	World Indoor Championships	Valencia, Spain	6th	1500 m	4:07.61
