= Natallia Kareiva =

Belarusian middle-distance runner

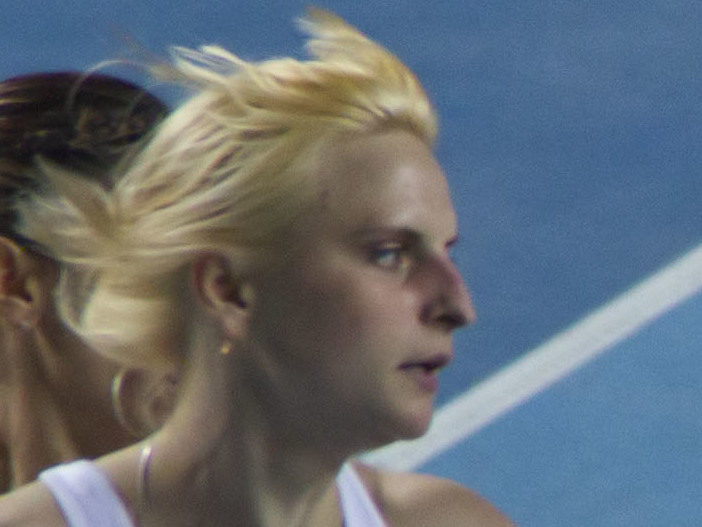

Personal information
- Nationality: Belarus
- Born: 14 November 1985 (age 40) Lida

Sport
- Sport: Middle-distance running

Natallia Stanislavauna Kareiva (Belarusian: Наталля Станіславаўна Карэйва; born 14 November 1985) is a Belarusian runner who specializes in the middle distance events.

Kareiva received a two-year ban from the sport for doping after her biological passport showed abnormalities. The ban was set for the periods from August 2014 to 2016 and all her performances from 28 July 2010 up to that period were erased.

== Achievements ==
Year	Competition	Venue	Position	Event	Notes
Representing Belarus
2004	World Junior Championships	Grosseto, Italy	1st	800 m	2:01.47
2005	European U23 Championships	Erfurt, Germany	11th (h)	800m	2:05.00
2007	European U23 Championships	Debrecen, Hungary	4th	800m	2:01.42
2007	Universiade	Bangkok, Thailand	5th	800 m	2:02.05
2008	European Indoor Cup	Moscow, Russia	3rd	1500 m	4:16.74
2010	World Indoor Championships	Doha, Qatar	9th	1500 m	4:12.76
2010	European Team Championships	Bergen, Norway	3rd	1500 m	4:07.98
2010	European Championships	Barcelona, Spain	~~13th (h)~~ DSQ	1500 m	4:06.89
2011	European Indoor Championships	Paris, France	~~22nd (h)~~ DSQ	1500 m	4:22.30
2011	European Team Championships	Stockholm, Sweden	~~4th~~ DSQ	1500 m	4:07.76
2011	World Championships	Daegu, South Korea	~~19th (h)~~ DSQ	1500 m	4:12.03
2012	World Indoor Championships	Istanbul, Turkey	~~4th~~ DSQ	1500 m	4:10.12
2012	Olympic Games	London, United Kingdom	~~7th~~ DSQ	1500 m	4:11.58
