= 2000 German Athletics Championships =

- Dates: 29–30 July 2000
- Host city: Braunschweig, Germany
- Venue: Eintracht-Stadion
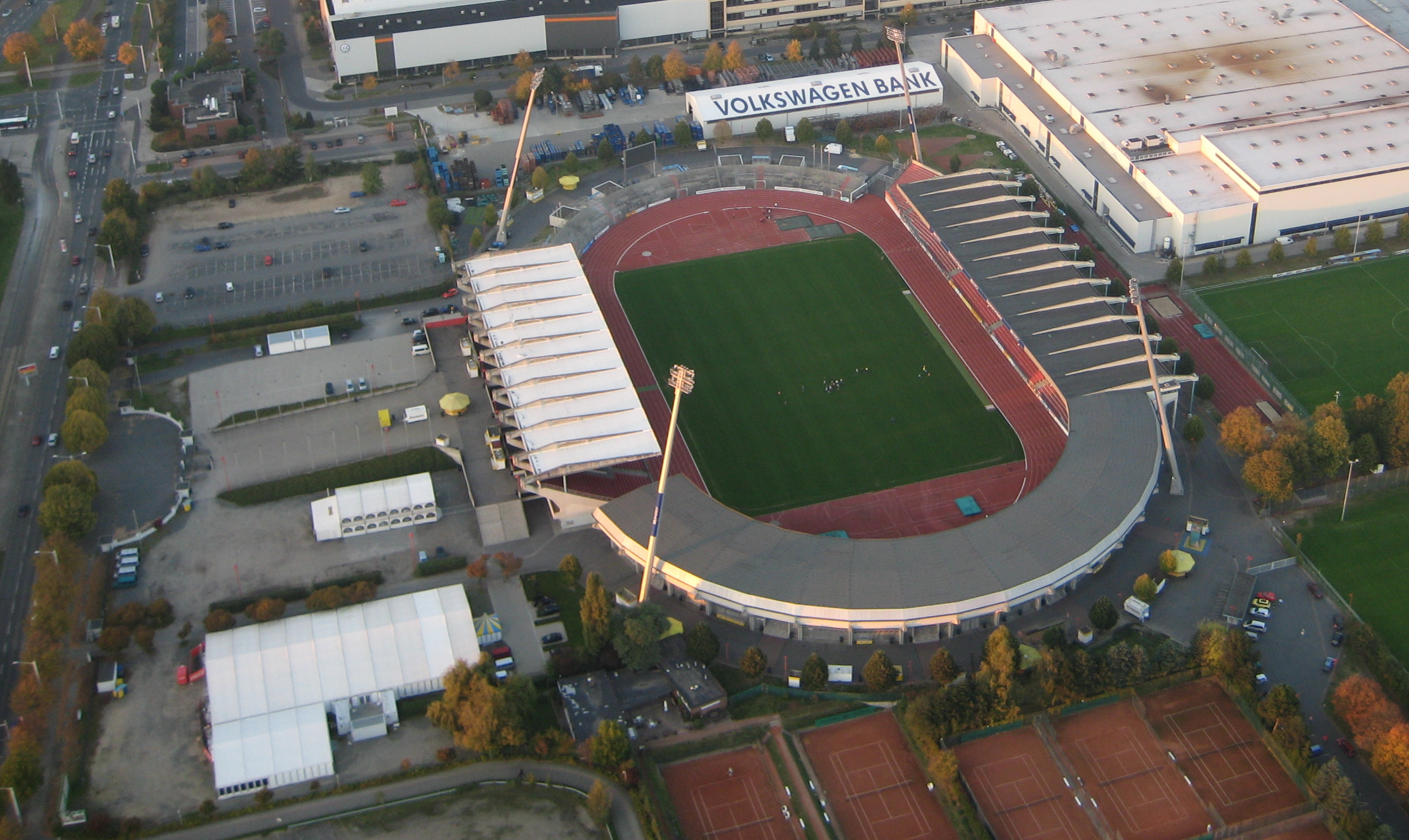
- Records set: 2 Championship Records

The 2000 German Athletics Championships were held at the Eintracht-Stadion in Braunschweig on 29–30 July 2000.

== Results ==
=== Men ===
Event	Gold	
100 m (−0.7 m/s)	Marc Blume	10.19
200 m (−0.6 m/s)	Marc Blume	20.82
400 m	Lars Figura	46.54
800 m	Nils Schumann	1:47.82
1500 m	Dirk Heinze	3:37.61
5000 m	Jirka Arndt	13:45.66
10,000 m walk	Andreas Erm	39:54.23
110 m hurdles	Florian Schwarthoff	13.42
400 m hurdles	Thomas Goller	50.38
3000 m steeplechase	Damian Kallabis	8:31.64
Triple jump	Charles Friedek	17.00
Long jump	Kofi Amoah Prah	8.11
High jump	Wolfgang Kreißig	2.30 =
Pole vault	Tim Lobinger	5.85
Shot put	Oliver-Sven Buder	20.41
Discus throw	Lars Riedel	65.67
Hammer throw	Karsten Kobs	80.21
Javelin throw	Boris Henry	84.40
4 × 100 m relay	LC Rehlingen I Gräber; Ruth; Kirch; Berndt	40.01
4 × 400 m relay	Bayer 04 Leverkusen I Hechler; Nitze; Oblong; Ehrnsperger	3:09.04

=== Women ===
Event	Gold	
100 m	Esther Möller	11.44
200 m	Andrea Philipp	22.99
400 m	Grit Breuer	51.22
800 m	Claudia Gesell	2:00.53
1500 m	Kathleen Friedrich	4:17.99
5000 m	Irina Mikitenko	15:50.55
5000 m walk	Beate Gummelt	21:15.49
100 m hurdles	Kirsten Bolm	13.04
400 m hurdles	Ulrike Urbansky	55.51
Triple jump	Tanja König	13.64
Long jump	Heike Drechsler	6.72
High jump	Amewu Mensah	1.90
Pole vault	Yvonne Buschbaum	4.45
Shot put	Nadine Kleinert	18.79
Discus throw	Franka Dietzsch	65.25
Hammer throw	Kirsten Münchow	67.84
Javelin throw	Tanja Damaske	66.73
4 × 100 m relay	LG Olympia Dortmund I Sina Schielke; Andrea Philipp; Esther Möller; Gabi Rockmeier	43.92
4 × 400 m relay	SC Magdeburg I Ulrike Urbansky; Heike Meißner; Ivonne Teichmann; Grit Breuer	3:31.58
