= Sandra Teixeira =

Portuguese middle-distance runner

Sandra Soares Teixeira (born 13 March 1978 in Coimbra) is a Portuguese athlete specialising in the middle distance events. She represented her country at four World Indoor Championships. She is of Cape Verdean descent.

== Competition record ==
Year	Competition	Venue	Position	Event	Notes
Representing Portugal
1998	Ibero-American Championships	Lisbon, Portugal	5th	4x400 m relay	3:39.27
1999	European U23 Championships	Gothenburg, Sweden	10th (h)	800 m	2:05.56
2001	World Indoor Championships	Lisbon, Portugal	8th (sf)	800 m	2:04.38
2002	European Indoor Championships	Vienna, Austria	10th (h)	800 m	2:04.43
2002	European Championships	Munich, Germany	9th (h)	4x400 m relay	3:35.36
2003	World Indoor Championships	Birmingham, United Kingdom	16th (h)	800 m	2:06.24
2003	Universiade	Daegu, South Korea	8th	800 m	2:03.01
2004	World Indoor Championships	Budapest, Hungary	23rd (h)	800 m	2:06.74
2004	Ibero-American Championships	Huelva, Spain	3rd	800 m	2:02.44
2005	European Indoor Championships	Madrid, Spain	14th (h)	1500 m	4:19.11
2005	Universiade	İzmir, Turkey	6th	800 m	2:02.92
2006	European Championships	Gothenburg, Sweden	20th (h)	800 m	2:04.73
2006	European Championships	Gothenburg, Sweden	27th (h)	1500 m	4:20.63
2006	Lusophony Games	Macau, China	1st	1500 m	4:25.43
2008	World Indoor Championships	Valencia, Spain	19th (h)	1500 m	4:23.14
2009	European Indoor Championships	Turin, Italy	15th (h)	1500 m	4:18.53
2009	Lusophony Games	Lisbon, Portugal	1st	800 m	2:06.42
2010	Ibero-American Championships	San Fernando, Spain	9th (h)	800 m	2:06.42

== Personal bests ==
Outdoor

- 800 metres – 2:01.55 (Salamanca 2006)
- 1000 metres – 2:42.35 (Lisbon 2004)
- 1500 metres – 4:10.28 (Leiria 2005)
- 3000 metres – 9:08.85 (Castellón 2009)
- 3000 metres steeplechase – 10:00.69 (Huelva 2008)

Indoor

- 800 metres – 2:02.47 (Espinho 2001)
- 1000 metres – 2:43.92 (Lisbon 2002)
- 1500 metres – 4:10.84 (Karlsruhe 2005)
- 3000 metres – 9:12.15 (Pombal 2009)
