= Natalya Yevdokimova =

Russian middle-distance runner

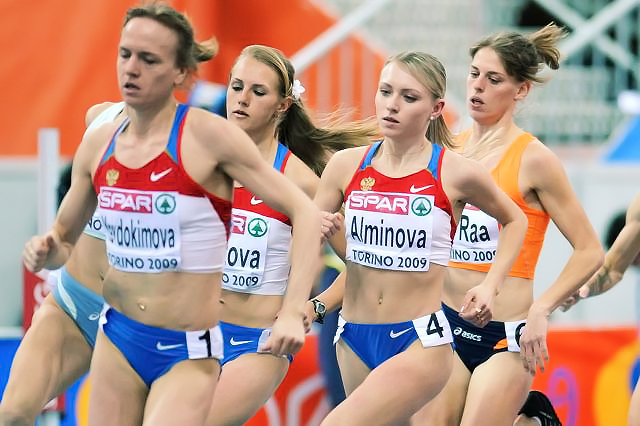
Yevdokimova (left) at the 2009 European Indoor Championships

Natalya Yevdokimova (Russian: Наталья Евдокимова; born 17 March 1978) is a Russian middle-distance runner who specializes in the 1500 metres. Having run her first sub-four-minute 1500 m, she was selected for the 2004 Olympic Games where she finished fourth in the women's 1500 metres.

She was eighth at the 2004 IAAF World Athletics Final, but improved to win a bronze medal at the competition the following year. After a long period away from top-level competition, she returned for the 2009 European Athletics Indoor Championships, where she finished in sixth place. Although she went on to compete at the 2009 World Championships in Athletics finishing in eighth in the women's 1500 m final, that result was subsequently disqualified due to a doping ruling

On 22 June 2017, the Court of Arbitration for Sport decided that Yevdokimova had engaged in blood doping practices and issued her with a four ban from competition commencing on 14 April 2016 along with an order than all her results between 17 August 2009 and 20 May 2012 be disqualified.

== Personal bests ==
- 800 metres - 2:02.78 min (2004)
- 1500 metres outdoors - 4:07.72 min (2009)
- 1500 metres indoors- 3:57.73 min (2005)
- One mile - 4:29.29 min (2003)

== International competitions ==
Year	Competition	Venue	Position	Event	Notes
Representing Ukraine
1996	World Junior Championships	Sydney, Australia	8th	800m	2:10.77
Representing Russia
2003	World Championships	Paris, France	7th (semis)	800 m	2:01.17
2004	Olympic Games	Athens, Greece	4th	1500 m	3:59.05
2004	World Athletics Final	Monte Carlo, Monaco	8th	1500 m	4:07.80
2005	World Athletics Final	Monte Carlo, Monaco	3rd	1500 m	4:00.60
2009	European Indoor Championships	Turin, Italy	5th	1500 m	4:12.33
2009	World Championships	Berlin, Germany	DSQ (8th)	1500 m	4:07.71
2011	World Championships	Daegu, South Korea	DSQ (13th (sf))	1500 m	4:11.70
