= 2010 IAAF World Indoor Championships – Women's 1500 metres =

The women's 1500 metres at the 2010 IAAF World Indoor Championships was held at the ASPIRE Dome on 12 and 14 March.

== Medalists ==
Gold	Silver	Bronze
Kalkidan Gezahegne; Ethiopia	Natalia Rodríguez; Spain	Gelete Burka; Ethiopia

== Records ==
Standing records prior to the 2010 IAAF World Indoor Championships
World record	Yelena Soboleva (RUS)	3:58.28	Moscow, Russia	18 February 2006
Championship record	Gelete Burka (ETH)	3:59.75	Valencia, Spain	9 March 2008
World Leading	Gelete Burka (ETH)	4:03.44	Stuttgart, Germany	6 February 2010
African record	Gelete Burka (ETH)	3:59.75	Valencia, Spain	9 March 2008
Asian record	Maryam Yusuf Jamal (BHR)	3:59.79	Valencia, Spain	9 March 2008
European record	Yelena Soboleva (RUS)	3:58.28	Moscow, Russia	18 February 2006
North and Central American and Caribbean record	Regina Jacobs (USA)	3:59.98	Boston, United States	1 February 2003
Oceanian Record	Sarah Jamieson (AUS)	4:11.08	Boston, United States	7 February 2009
South American record	Letitia Vriesde (SUR)	4:14.05	Budapest, Hungary	12 February 1992

== Qualification standards ==
Indoor	Outdoor
4:15.00 or 4:32.00 (Mile)	4:04.00 or 4:22.00 (Mile)

== Schedule ==
Date	Time	Round
March 12, 2010	16:30	Heats
March 14, 2010	16:45	Final

== Results ==
=== Heats ===
Qualification: First 3 in each heat (Q) and the next 3 fastest (q) advance to the final.

Rank	Heat	Name	Nationality	Time	Notes
1	2	Kalkidan Gezahegne	Ethiopia	4:08.91	Q
2	2	Natalia Rodríguez	Spain	4:09.19	Q
3	2	Sylwia Ejdys	Poland	4:09.23	Q
4	2	Erin Donohue	United States	4:10.12	q, PB
5	1	Gelete Burka	Ethiopia	4:12.08	Q
DQ	1	Anna Alminova	Russia	~~4:12.50~~	Doping
6	1	Sarah Bowman	United States	4:12.91	Q, PB
7	2	Natallia Kareiva	Belarus	4:12.91	q
8	1	Helen Clitheroe	Great Britain	4:13.97	q
9	1	Fanjanteino Félix	France	4:14.62	
10	2	Yevgeniya Zolotova	Russia	4:15.33	
11	1	Irene Jelagat	Kenya	4:15.63	q
12	2	Kelly McNeice-Reid	Ireland	4:16.26	
13	2	Charlotte Best	Great Britain	4:16.40	
14	2	Nicole Edwards	Canada	4:16.46	
15	1	Roseanne Galligan	Ireland	4:17.04	
16	1	Ulrika Johansson	Sweden	4:22.94	
	1	Eliane Saholinirina	Madagascar	DNF	

=== Final ===
Rank	Name	Nationality	Time	Notes
1st place, gold medalist(s)	Kalkidan Gezahegne	Ethiopia	4:08.14	
2nd place, silver medalist(s)	Natalia Rodríguez	Spain	4:08.30	
3rd place, bronze medalist(s)	Gelete Burka	Ethiopia	4:08.39	
4	Sylwia Ejdys	Poland	4:09.24	
5	Irene Jelagat	Kenya	4:09.57	PB
6	Erin Donohue	United States	4:09.59	PB
DQ	Anna Alminova	Russia	~~4:09.81~~	Doping
7	Helen Clitheroe	Great Britain	4:10.38	
8	Sarah Bowman	United States	4:10.72	PB
9	Natallia Kareiva	Belarus	4:12.76	
