= Kathleen Friedrich =

German middle-distance runner

Medal record

Women's athletics

IAAF World Cup
Bronze medal – third place	2002 Madrid	1500 m

Kathleen Friedrich (born 13 July 1977) is a German former middle-distance runner who specialised in the 1500 metres. She has a personal best of 4 minutes 4.27 seconds, as well as an 800 metres best of 2:01.45.

Her highest achievement was a bronze medal at the 2002 IAAF World Cup. She represented her country at the 2001 World Championships in Athletics and also at the 2002 European Athletics Championships. Friedrich was a seven-time national champion, with five straight wins at the German Athletics Championships from 2000 to 2004 and two indoor titles. At the junior level, she was the 800 m silver medallist at the 1996 World Junior Championships in Athletics.

== Career ==
Born in Potsdam, her first success came at the 1996 World Junior Championships in Athletics where she was the narrow runner-up in the 800 metres behind compatriot Claudia Gesell. After this, she began to improve her times in the 1999 season, recording a best of 2:02.18 for the 800 m and placing second at the German Indoor Athletics Championships. She ran a 1500 metres best of 4:11.61 in June, but failed to finish that distance at the 1999 European Athletics U23 Championships final.

A second-place finish at the 2000 German Indoor Championships and a new best of 4:08.99 in Chemnitz brought her selection for the 2000 European Athletics Indoor Championships, although she again failed to finish in international competition. Outdoors she claimed her first 1500 m national title at the 2000 German Athletics Championships and improved to 4:05.97 in August. She went on to take five consecutive German 1500 m titles between 2000 and 2004.

She opened 2001 with an indoor best of 4:08.42 and placed fifth at 2001 European Cup. She was chosen for the German team at the 2001 World Championships in Athletics, but once more failed to finish the distance on the mainstage (this time in the semi-finals). She closed the season with improvements, however, running 4:05.10 for fourth at the Weltklasse Zurich then a lifetime best of 4:04.27 for fourth at the ISTAF Berlin meeting.

Friedrich won her first German indoor title in 2002 and then set a German record of 5:42.55 for the infrequently held indoor 2000 m event. She was eighth at the 2002 European Cup and retained her outdoor national title. On her continental championship debut at the 2002 European Athletics Championships she placed fourth in her heat, but the two-round format meant she did not make the final. She ended her season with her first and only senior international medal at the 2002 IAAF World Cup, claiming the bronze medal for the German team.

Her performances declined in the 2003 season, although she did manage to win the national title outdoors and set a 3000 metres best of 9:07.83. She placed eighth at the 2003 European Cup. The following year she completed an indoor/outdoor national title double and was fifth at the 2004 European Cup. The 2005 season proved to be the last of her, as she retired at age 28. Highlights of her final year were an 800 m best of 2:01.45, a runner-up finish in that distance at the 2005 German Athletics Championships, and sixth place in the 2006 European Cup.

Since retiring from athletics she has become a professional photographer.

== Personal bests ==
- 400 metres – 54.51 sec (1996)
- 800 metres – 2:01.45 min (2005)
- 800 metres indoor – 2:02.18 min (1999)
- 1000 metres – 2:40.57 min (2005)
- 1500 metres – 4:04.27 min (2001)
- 1500 metres indoor – 4:08.42 min (2001)
- 2000 metres – 5:42.55 min (2002) NR
- 3000 metres – 9:17.48 min (2005)
- 3000 metres – 9:07.83 min (2003)

== National titles ==
- German Athletics Championships
  - 1500 metres: 2000, 2001, 2002, 2003, 2004
- German Indoor Athletics Championships
  - 1500 metres: 2002, 2004

== International competitions ==
Year	Competition	Venue	Position	Event	Notes
Representing Germany
1995	European Junior Championships	Nyíregyháza, Hungary	4th	4 × 400 m relay	3:38.76
1996	World Junior Championships	Sydney, Australia	2nd	800m	2:02.70
1999	European U23 Championships	Gothenburg, Sweden	6th (h)	1500m	4:16.10
2000	European Indoor Championships	Ghent, Belgium	5th (h)	1500 metres	4:15.43
2001	European Cup	Bremen, Germany	5th	1500 metres	4:09.79
2001	World Championships	Edmonton, Canada	11th (h)	1500 metres	4:11.35
2002	European Championships	Munich, Germany	14th (h)	1500 metres	4:08.98
2002	IAAF World Cup	Madrid, Spain	3rd	1500 metres	4:10.20
