= Yekaterina Sharmina =

Russian runner (born 1986)

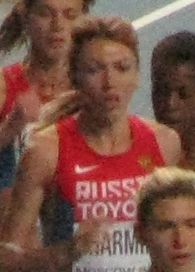
Yekaterina Sharmina at the Women's 1500 metres final at the 2013 World Championships in Athletics

Yekaterina Mikhaylovna Sharmina (née Martynova; Russian: Екатерина Михайловна Мартынова; born August 6, 1986, in Bryansk) is a Russian runner who specializes in the middle-distance events.

She is coached by Svetlana Pleskach-Styrkina, who also coaches Yekaterina Kostetskaya.

== Doping ==
In November 2016, after athlete biological passport (ABP) analysis indicated blood doping, the Court of Arbitration for Sport decided to void Sharmina's results between June 17, 2011, and August 5, 2015, and to ban her from competition for three years, beginning on December 7, 2015. As a result, she will be stripped of her 1,500m Universiade title from Kazan.

== Achievements ==
Year	Competition	Venue	Position	Event	Notes
Representing Russia
2003	World Youth Championships	Sherbrooke, Canada	4th	800 m	2:05.62
2004	World Junior Championships	Grosseto, Italy	7th (sf)	800m	2:06.16
2005	European Junior Championships	Kaunas, Lithuania	2nd	1500 m	4:15.46
2007	European U23 Championships	Debrecen, Hungary	7th	800m	2:03.50
2011	European Indoor Championships	Paris, France	3rd	1500 m	4:14.16Void
2011	World Championships	Daegu, South Korea	9th (sf)	1500 m	4:08.67Void
2012	Olympic Games	London, United Kingdom	33rd (h)	1500 m	4:13.86Void
2013	Universiade	Kazan, Russia	1st	1500 m	4:05.49Void
2013	World Championships	Moscow, Russia	6th	1500 m	4:05.49
