= Merve Aydın =

Turkish middle-distance runner

Personal information
- Nationality: Turkey
- Born: 17 March 1990 (age 36) Bakırköy, Istanbul, Turkey
- Height: 180 cm (5 ft 11 in)
- Weight: 58 kg (128 lb)

Sport
- Sport: Running
- Events: 800 metres, 1500 metres
- Club: Galatasaray
- Coached by: Gülnara Mamadova

Achievements and titles
- Personal bests: 400 m 53.48 (2009); 800 m 2.00.33 (2008); 1500 m 4.29.45 (2007)
Medal record
Women's athletics
Representing Turkey
World Youth Championships
Silver medal – second place	2008 Bydgoszcz	800 m
European U23 Championships
Silver medal – second place	2011 Ostrava	800 m
Universiade
Silver medal – second place	2011 Shenzhen	4x400 m relay
European Team Championships
Gold medal – first place	2011 İzmir	4x400 m relay

Merve Aydın (born 17 March 1990) is a Turkish middle-distance runner. She is a member of Fenerbahce athletics team. The 180 cm (5 ft 11 in) tall athlete at 58 kg (128 lb) is coached by Gülnara Mamadova.

She won a silver medal in the 2008 Bydgoszcz at the 2008 World Junior Championships in Athletics and at the 2011 European Athletics U23 Championships. Merve Aydın repeated her silver medal wins in the 4 × 400 m relay event at the 2011 Summer Universiade held in Shenzhen, China.

Merve Aydın qualified for participation in the 800 m event at the 2012 Summer Olympics. She was injured during the second lap of her qualifying Olympic run on 8 Aug 2012. Despite the injury she refused to withdraw and limped to the finish line coming in last in her heat to a standing ovation with a time of 3:24:35.

== Achievements ==
Year	Competition	Venue	Position	Event	Notes
Representing Turkey
2006	World Junior Championships	Beijing, China	36th (h)	800m	2:17.16
2008	World Junior Championships in Athletics	Bydgoszcz, Poland	2nd	800 m	2:00.92 NJ
2011	European Team Championships-First League	İzmir, Turkey	1st	4 × 400 m relay	3:29.40 NR
2011	European Athletics U23 Championships	Ostrava, Czech Republic	1st	800 m	2:00.46 SB
2011	Summer Universiade	Shenzhen, China	8th	800 m	2:11.91
2011	Summer Universiade	Shenzhen, China	2nd	4 × 400 m relay	3:30.14
2012	World Indoor Championships	Istanbul, Turkey	6th (h)	800 m	2:01.19 iNR
