= 1999 European Athletics U23 Championships – Women's 800 metres =

The women's 800 metres event at the 1999 European Athletics U23 Championships was held in Gothenburg, Sweden, at Ullevi on 30 July and 1 August 1999.

== Medalists ==
Gold	Claudia Gesell; Germany
Silver	Irina Krakoviak; Lithuania
Bronze	Laetitia Valdonado; France

== Results ==
=== Final ===
1 August

Rank	Name	Nationality	Time	Notes
1st place, gold medalist(s)	Claudia Gesell	Germany	2:03.05	
2nd place, silver medalist(s)	Irina Krakoviak	Lithuania	2:04.08	
3rd place, bronze medalist(s)	Laetitia Valdonado	France	2:04.20	
4	Ivonne Teichmann	Germany	2:04.36	
5	Nédia Semedo	Portugal	2:04.81	
6	Aleksandra Dereń	Poland	2:05.55	
7	Irina Mistyukevich	Russia	2:06.11	
8	Yuliya Kumpan	Ukraine	2:07.14	

=== Heats ===
30 July
Qualified: first 2 in each heat and 2 best to the Final

==== Heat 1 ====
Rank	Name	Nationality	Time	Notes
1	Irina Mistyukevich	Russia	2:05.75	Q
2	Laetitia Valdonado	France	2:06.15	Q
3	Tytti Reho	Finland	2:06.46	
4	Emma Davies	Great Britain	2:06.89	
	Maria Cioncan	Romania	DNF	

==== Heat 2 ====
Rank	Name	Nationality	Time	Notes
1	Aleksandra Dereń	Poland	2:03.05	Q
2	Ivonne Teichmann	Germany	2:03.12	Q
3	Yuliya Taranova	Russia	2:04.31	
4	Sandra Teixeira	Portugal	2:05.56	
	Anca Safta	Romania	DNF	

==== Heat 3 ====
Rank	Name	Nationality	Time	Notes
1	Claudia Gesell	Germany	1:59.87	Q, CR
2	Irina Krakoviak	Lithuania	2:01.37	Q
3	Yuliya Kumpan	Ukraine	2:02.60	q
4	Nédia Semedo	Portugal	2:03.22	q
5	Sonja Roman	Slovenia	2:04.06	
6	Petra Sedláková	Czech Republic	2:04.20	

== Participation ==
According to an unofficial count, 16 athletes from 12 countries participated in the event.

- Czech Republic (1)
- Finland (1)
- France (1)
- Germany (2)
- Great Britain (1)
- Lithuania (1)
- Poland (1)
- Portugal (2)
- Romania (2)
- Russia (2)
- Slovenia (1)
- Ukraine (1)
