= Athletics at the 2011 Summer Universiade – Women's 800 metres =

The women's 800 metres event at the 2011 Summer Universiade was held on 16–18 August.

== Medalists ==
Gold	Silver	Bronze
Olha Zavhorodnya; Ukraine	Elena Kofanova; Russia	Liliya Lobanova; Ukraine

== Results ==
=== Heats ===
Qualification: First 3 in each heat (Q) and the next 4 fastest (q) qualified for the semifinals.

Rank	Heat	Name	Nationality	Time	Notes
1	1	Olha Zavhorodnya	Ukraine	2:03.34	Q
2	4	Elena Kofanova	Russia	2:03.72	Q
3	3	Merve Aydın	Turkey	2:04.00	Q
4	3	Zhao Jing	China	2:04.24	Q
5	3	Anne Kesselring	Germany	2:04.80	Q
6	3	Luiza Gega	Albania	2:04.86	q
7	3	Anastasiya Vosmerikova	Russia	2:04.88	q
8	2	Liliya Lobanova	Ukraine	2:04.91	Q
9	4	Karin Storbacka	Finland	2:04.92	Q
10	2	Kelly Hetherington	Australia	2:04.97	Q
11	2	Eglė Balčiūnaitė	Lithuania	2:04.97	Q
12	1	Charlotte Best	Great Britain	2:05.18	Q
13	2	Danuta Urbanik	Poland	2:05.29	q
14	2	Élian Périz	Spain	2:05.40	q
15	1	Helen Crofts	Canada	2:05.48	Q
16	4	Annie LeBlanc	Canada	2:05.67	Q
17	1	Muriel Coneo	Colombia	2:06.18	
18	3	Holly Noack	Australia	2:06.30	
19	2	Liu Nian	China	2:06.32	
20	4	Margarita Matsko	Kazakhstan	2:06.62	
21	4	Yeliz Kurt	Turkey	2:06.86	
22	1	Chaimae Alaoui	Morocco	2:08.19	
23	4	Ganthi Kumarasamy	Malaysia	2:08.70	SB
24	3	Inam Jabbar	Iraq	2:09.44	
25	2	Jevgenia Mateitsuk	Estonia	2:09.48	
26	4	Liina Tšernov	Estonia	2:09.60	
27	1	Ninfa Barnard	United States Virgin Islands	2:18.02	PB
28	3	Leong Kaman	Macau	2:22.44	
29	1	Oumkoulthoum Moustoifa	Comoros	2:43.62	

=== Semifinals ===
Qualification: First 3 in each heat (Q) and the next 2 fastest (q) qualified for the final.

Rank	Heat	Name	Nationality	Time	Notes
1	2	Elena Kofanova	Russia	2:01.14	Q
2	2	Olha Zavhorodnya	Ukraine	2:01.25	Q
3	2	Merve Aydın	Turkey	2:01.96	Q
4	2	Helen Crofts	Canada	2:02.98	q
5	2	Anne Kesselring	Germany	2:03.05	q
6	2	Élian Périz	Spain	2:03.82	
7	2	Luiza Gega	Albania	2:04.13	
8	2	Karin Storbacka	Finland	2:04.27	
9	1	Liliya Lobanova	Ukraine	2:04.73	Q
10	1	Eglė Balčiūnaitė	Lithuania	2:05.21	Q
11	1	Zhao Jing	China	2:05.26	Q
12	1	Kelly Hetherington	Australia	2:05.71	
13	1	Danuta Urbanik	Poland	2:05.88	
14	1	Anastasiya Vosmerikova	Russia	2:06.36	
15	1	Charlotte Best	Great Britain	2:06.53	
16	1	Annie LeBlanc	Canada	2:07.73	

=== Final ===
Official Video

Rank	Name	Nationality	Time	Notes
1st place, gold medalist(s)	Olha Zavhorodnya	Ukraine	1:59.56	PB
2nd place, silver medalist(s)	Elena Kofanova	Russia	1:59.94	
3rd place, bronze medalist(s)	Liliya Lobanova	Ukraine	2:00.42	
4	Eglė Balčiūnaitė	Lithuania	2:01.68	
5	Zhao Jing	China	2:02.10	SB
6	Helen Crofts	Canada	2:04.40	
7	Anne Kesselring	Germany	2:05.33	
8	Merve Aydın	Turkey	2:11.91	
