= Charlotte Best (athlete) =

English middle-distance runner

Personal information
- Born: 7 March 1985 (age 40)
- Height: 5 ft 5 in (165 cm)
- Weight: 8 st 12 lb (124 lb; 56 kg)

Sport
- Sport: Athletics
- Event(s): 800 m, 1500 m
- Club: Crawley AC
- Coached by: George Gandy (2004–2012); Mark Best (–2004)

Charlotte Best (born 7 March 1985) is a retired English middle-distance runner. She represented Great Britain in 1500 metres at the 2010 World Indoor Championships without advancing from the first round. In addition she won bronze medals at the 2007 and 2011 Summer Universiades.

== International competitions ==
Year	Competition	Venue	Position	Event	Notes
Representing Great Britain
2004	World Junior Championships	Grosseto, Italy	5th	4 × 400 m relay	3:33.67
2007	European U23 Championships	Debrecen, Hungary	5th	800 m	2:02.72
2007	Universiade	Bangkok, Thailand	3rd	800 m	2:01.50
2010	World Indoor Championships	Doha, Qatar	13th (h)	1500 m	4:16.40
2011	Universiade	Shenzhen, China	15th (sf)	800 m	2:06.53
2011	Universiade	Shenzhen, China	3rd	4 × 400 m relay	3:33.09

== Personal bests ==
Outdoor

- 400 metres – 54.97 (Loughborough 2007)
- 800 metres – 2:01.50 (Bangkok 2007)
- 1000 metres – 2:39.68 (Oslo 2012)
- 1500 metres – 4:16.57 (Watford 2007)
- One mile – 4:45.72 (Sheffield 2005)

Indoor

- 600 metres – 1:34.89 (Birmingham 2006)
- 800 metres – 2:05.25 (Sheffield 2012)
- 1000 metres – 2:49.96 (Birmingham 2006)
- 1500 metres – 4:12.29 (Birmingham 2009)
- One mile – 4:32.29 (Birmingham 2010)
