= Aurélie Coulaud =

French middle-distance runner

Personal information
- Other names: Aurélie Coulaud-Hernandez
- Born: 5 May 1979 (age 46) Le Chambon-Feugerolles, France
- Years active: 2000s
- Height: 172 cm (5 ft 8 in)
- Weight: 55 kg (121 lb)

Sport
- Country: France
- Sport: Athletics
- Event(s): 800 m, 1500 m

Aurélie Coulaud (born 5 May 1979 in Le Chambon-Feugerolles) is a French athlete specializing in the middle-distance running.

She won the national title in the 800 metres at the French Athletics Championships in 2002, and also two indoor national titles over 1500 metres in 2002 and 2003.

Coulaud is the sister of Julie Coulaud, another well known French middle-distance runner.

== National titles ==
- French Athletics Championships
  - 800 m: 2002
- French Indoor Athletics Championships
  - 1500 m: 2002, 2003

== Personal bests ==
| Event | Performance | Location | Date |
|---|---|---|---|
| 800 metres | 2:02.12 | Strasbourg | 29 June 2002 |
| 1500 metres | 4:11.92 | Bron | 3 July 2003 |
