= Sviatlana Kouhan =

Belarusian long-distance runner

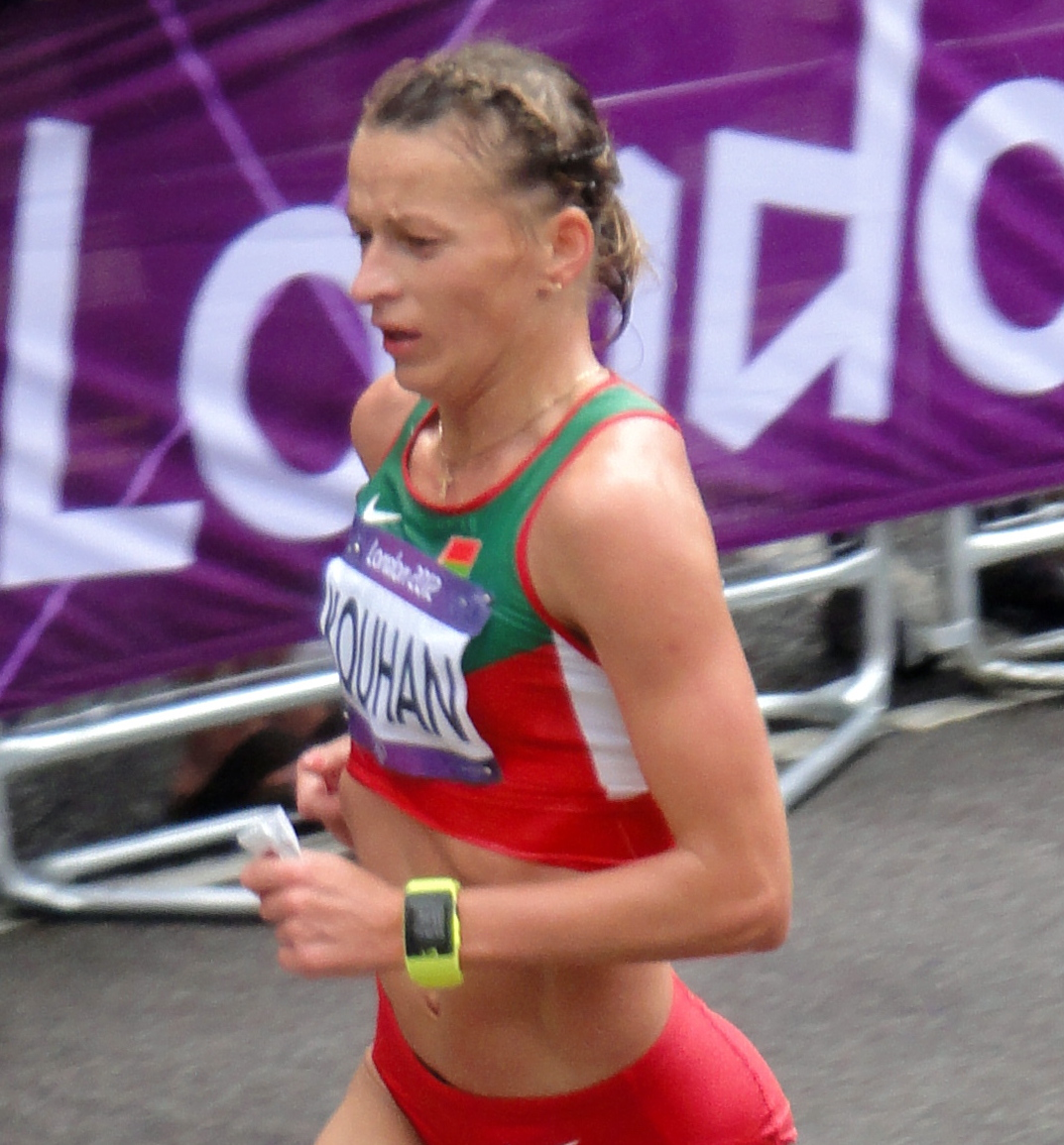

Personal information
- Born: 26 August 1980 (age 45)
- Height: 1.63 m (5 ft 4 in)
- Weight: 51 kg (112 lb)

Sport
- Country: Belarus
- Sport: Athletics
- Event: Marathon

Sviatlana Kouhan (Belarusian: Святлана Коўган, née Klimkovich - Клімковіч; born 26 August 1980 in Nemanitsa) is a Belarusian long-distance runner. She competed in the marathon at the 2012 Summer Olympics, placing 34th with a time of 2:30:26.
