= Anna Alminova =

Russian middle-distance runner

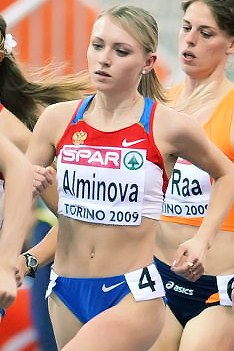
- Alminova at the 2009 European Athletics Indoor Championships

Personal information
- Nationality: Russian
- Born: 17 January 1985 (age 41) Kirov, Russian SFSR, Soviet Union
- Height: 1.65 m (5 ft 5 in)
- Weight: 50 kg (110 lb)

Sport
- Country: Russia
- Sport: Women's athletics
- Event(s): 800 metres, 1500 metres
Medal record
World Junior Championships
Silver medal – second place	2004 Grosseto	1500 m

Anna Aleksandrovna Alminova (born 17 January 1985) is a Russian middle-distance runner who specializes in the 1500 metres. She was the European indoor champion in the 1500 m in 2009, but lost the title when she was found to have been doping.

== Career ==
In the 800 metres, she finished fifth at the 2003 World Youth Championships. In the 1500 metres, she won the silver medal at the 2004 World Junior Championships, finished eighth at the 2005 European Indoor Championships and eleventh at the 2008 Olympic Games. At the 2009 European Indoor Championships she won the gold medal in the 1500 m. She reached the semi-finals of the event at the 2009 World Championships in Athletics in August and was seventh at the 2009 IAAF World Athletics Final.

== Doping ==
She had her best ever global level performance in Doha at the 2010 IAAF World Indoor Championships, running 4:09.81 for seventh place in the 1500 m final. However, she tested positive for pseudoephedrine at the championships as a result of having taken an over-the-counter medicine to treat a cold. She received a ban for three months – a light sentence to reflect the low-level seriousness of the drug and that she had not ingested the substance for competitive reasons.

Alminova was sanctioned for doping after her biological passport had shown abnormalities. The ban was for two years and six months and ran from 16 January 2011 to 15 May 2014. Her results was annulled from 16 February 2009.

== International competitions ==
Year	Competition	Venue	Position	Event	Notes
Representing Russia
2001	World Youth Championships	Debrecen, Hungary	5th	800 m	2:08.20
2004	World Junior Championships	Grosseto, Italy	2nd	1500 m	4:16.32
2005	European Athletics Indoor Championships	Madrid, Spain	8th	1500 m	4:13.89
2008	Summer Olympics	Beijing, China	11th	1500 m	4:06.99
2009	European Athletics Indoor Championships	Turin, Italy	DSQ (1st)	1500 m	
2009	European Athletics Indoor Championships	Turin, Italy	DSQ (6th)	3000 m	
2009	European Team Championships	Leiria, Portugal	DSQ	1500 m	
2009	World Championships	Berlin, Germany	DSQ	1500 m	
2009	World Athletics Final	Thessaloniki, Greece	DSQ	1500 m	
2010	World Indoor Championships	Doha, Qatar	DSQ	1500 m	
2010	European Championships	Barcelona, Spain	DSQ	1500 m	

== See also ==
- List of doping cases in athletics
- Russia at the World Athletics Championships
- Doping at the World Athletics Championships
