= Jekaterina Duman =

Estonian athletics competitor

Jekaterina Duman (born Zaidentsal; born 28 October 1983) is an Estonian middle-distance runner.

She was born in Tallinn. In 2008 she graduated from University of Tartu's Institute of Physical Education.

She began athletics training in 1998, coached by Aleksander Tšikin. 1999–2008 her coach was Ivan Kovaljov. She competed at the 2007 Summer Universiade. She is multiple-times Estonian champion in different running disciplines. 2002–2007 she was a member of Estonian national athletics team.

Personal best:

- 400 m: 54,88 (2007)
- 800 m: 2.06,50 (2007)
