= Tatiana Vladimirovna Egorova =

Russian botanist (1930–2007)

Dr. Tatiana Vladimirovna Egorova
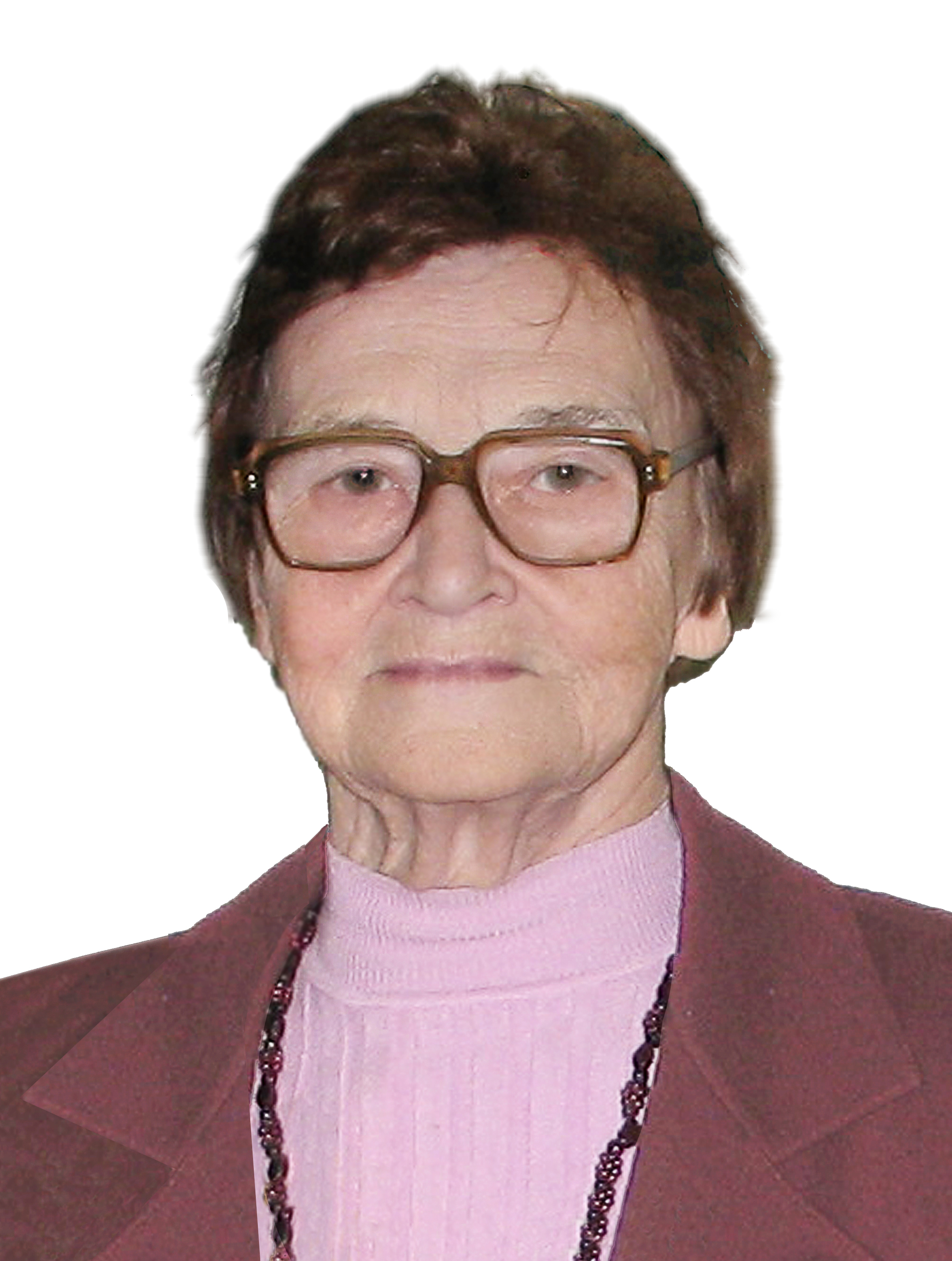
- Dr. Tatiana Vladimirovna Egorova
- Born: December 1, 1930
- Died: May 6, 2007 (aged 76)
- Awards: USSR State Prize, Komarov price
- Scientific career
- Fields: Botany
- Workplaces: Komarov Botanical Institute
- Author abbrev. (botany): T.V.Egorova

Dr. Tatiana Vladimirovna Egorova (1930–2007) was a Russian botanist and author noted for working at the Saint Petersburg Botanical Garden and for editing the multi-volume Plants of Central Asia series. She described over 170 species, most in the genus Carex. The standard author abbreviation T.V.Egorova is used to indicate this person as the author when citing a botanical name.

== Works ==
- Egorova, T. V (1966). Osoki SSSR: vidy podroda Vignea (in Russian). Izd-vo "Nauka". OCLC 5381809.
- Egorova, T. V; Takhtadzhi︠a︡n, A. L (1999). Osoki (Carex L.) Rossii i sopredelʹnyīkh gosudarstv (v predelakh byvshego SSSR). Sankt-Peterburgskai︠a︡ gosudarstvennai︠a︡ kimiko-farmat︠s︡evticheskai︠a︡ akademii︠a︡; Missuriĭskiĭ botanicheskiĭ sad. ISBN 9785808500518. OCLC 43927060.
- Egorova, Tatjana V (1999). Osoki (Carex L.) Rossii i sopredel'nych gosudarstv (v predelach byvšego SSSR) = The sedges (Carex L.) of Russia and adjacent states (within the limits of the former USSR). Sankt-Petersburgskaja Gosudarstvennaja Chimiko-Farmazevtičeskaja Akad. ISBN 9780915279678. OCLC 750601586.
- Cvelev, Nikolaj N; Egorova, Tat'jana V; Grubov, Valerij I (2000). Plants of Central Asia: plant collections from China and Mongolia. 3, 3. Science Publ. ISBN 9781578081141. OCLC 634860634.
