= Binnaz Uslu =

Turkish athletics competitor

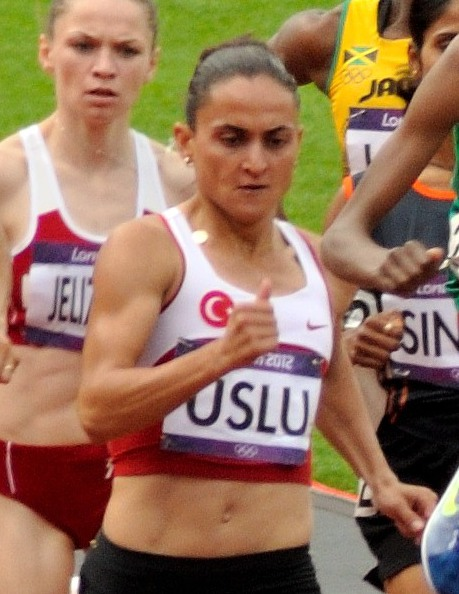

Personal information
- Nationality: Turkey
- Born: March 12, 1985 (age 41) Ankara, Turkey
- Height: 165 cm (5 ft 5 in)
- Weight: 55 kg (121 lb)

Sport
- Sport: middle-distance and long-distance running
- Club: Enkaspor
- Coached by: Yahya Sevüktekin

Achievements and titles
- Personal bests: 1000 m: 2:41.79 NR junior (2006); 1500 m: 4:11.36 (2010); 3000 m: 9:06.82 (2010); 3000 m st: 9:24.06 NR (2011); 5000 m: 15:57.21 (2005); 10,000 m: 34:34.79 (2006)
Medal record
European Cross Country Championships
Silver medal – second place	2010 Albufeira	Senior
Mediterranean Games
Bronze medal – third place	2005 Almería	4×400 m relay
Bronze medal – third place	2005 Almería	800 m
Universiade
Gold medal – first place	2011 Shenzhen	3,000 m steep
Gold medal – first place	2011 Shenzhen	5,000 m
Silver medal – second place	2005 İzmir	800 m

Binnaz Uslu (born March 12, 1985, in Ankara) is a retired Turkish middle-distance and long-distance runner. She was banned from sport for life in 2014, after her second doping violation.

The 165 cm (5 ft 5 in) tall athlete at 55 kg (121 lb) is a member of Enkaspor athletics team, where she was coached by Yahya Sevüktekin. Uslu was a student at the Gazi University in Ankara.

She participated at the 2005 Mediterranean Games in Almería and won a bronze medal in 800 m with 2:02.68. In the 4×400 metres relay, she won another bronze medal with her teammates Özge Gürler, Birsen Bekgöz and Pınar Saka in 3:40.75 minutes. In 2006 at the 13th SPAR European Cross Country Championships in San Giorgio su Legnano, Italy she won the gold medal in the under 23 section.

She won the silver medal at the 2010 European Cross Country Championships behind Jessica Augusto.

== Doping ==
Uslu failed a drug test for doping taken by the IAAF during a camp in Antalya, Turkey on March 13, 2007. She was banned from athletics from March 2007 to March 2009. Her coach Yahya Sevüktekin was also banned.

In 2014, she was banned from sport for life after the IAAf re-analyzed a sample she had given at the 2011 IAAF World Athletics Championships in Daegu.

== International competitions ==
Year	Competition	Venue	Position	Event	Notes
Representing Turkey
2003	World Cross Country Championships	Lausanne, Switzerland	98th	Junior race (6.215 km)	27:23
2003	European Junior Championships	Tampere, Finland	2nd	3000 m	9:23.10
2004	World Cross Country Championships	Brussels, Belgium	39th	Junior race (6 km)	22:37
2004	World Junior Championships	Grosseto, Italy	1st (semis)	800 m	2:02.85
2004	Olympic Games	Athens, Greece	22nd (heats)	800 m	2:03.46
2004	European Cross Country Championships	Heringsdorf, Germany	1st	Junior race (3.64 km)	15:32
2005	World Cross Country Championships	St Etienne - St Galmier, France	24th	Short race (4.196 km)	14:11
2005	Mediterranean Games	Almería, Spain	3rd	800 m	2:02.68
2005	Mediterranean Games	Almería, Spain	3rd	4 × 400 m relay	3:40.75
2005	European U23 Championships	Erfurt, Germany	7th (h)	800m	2:04.27
2005	European U23 Championships	Erfurt, Germany	1st	5000m	15:57.21
2005	World Championships	Helsinki, Finland	26th (heats)	800 m	2:03.73
2005	Universiade	İzmir, Turkey	2nd	800 m	2:01.42
2006	World Cross Country Championships	Fukuoka, Japan	59th	Short race (4 km)	14:06
2006	European Cross Country Championships	San Giorgio su Legnano, Italy	1st	Under-23 race (5.975 km)	18:47
2010	European Championships	Barcelona, Spain	20th (h)	1500 m	4:12.04
2010	European Championships	Barcelona, Spain	19th (h)	3000 m steeplechase	10:15.28
2010	European Cross Country Championships	Albufeira, Portugal	2nd	Senior race (8.170 km)	26:57
2011	Universiade	Shenzhen, China	1st	5000 m	15:41.15
2011	Universiade	Shenzhen, China	1st	3000 m steeplechase	9:33.50
2011	World Championships	Daegu, South Korea	~~7th~~ DSQ	3000 m steeplechase	~~9:31.06~~ (Doping)

== Personal bests ==
- 1000 m: 2:41.79 NR junior (2006)
- 1500 m: 4:11.36 (2010)
- 3000 m: 9:06.82 (2010)
- 3000 m steeplechase: 9:24.06 NR (2011)
- 5000 m: 15:57.21 (2005)
- 10,000 m: 34:34.79 (2006)

== See also ==
- List of doping cases in athletics
