= Nelya Neporadna =

Ukrainian middle-distance runner

Personal information
- Nationality: Ukrainian
- Born: 29 July 1985 (age 40)

Sport
- Sport: Middle-distance running
- Event: 1500 metres
Medal record
Women's athletics
Representing Ukraine
World Junior Championships
Gold medal – first place	2004 Grosseto	1500 m
European Junior Championships
Gold medal – first place	2003 Tampere	1500 m

Nelya Neporadna (born 29 July 1985 in Ivano-Frankivsk Oblast) is a Ukrainian middle distance runner who specializes in the 1500 metres.

She finished eleventh at the 2003 World Championships in Paris and won the 2004 World Junior Championships in Grosseto.

Her personal best time is 4:03.73 minutes, achieved in June 2005 in Athens.
