= Élodie Guégan =

French middle-distance runner

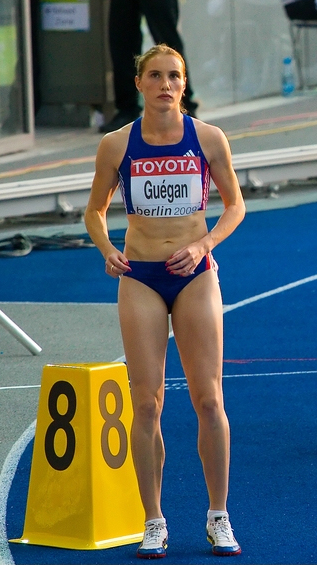
- Guégan at the 2009 World Championships

Personal information
- Nationality: France
- Born: 19 December 1985 (age 40) Ploemeur, Morbihan, France
- Height: 1.67 m (5 ft 6 in)
- Weight: 55 kg (121 lb)

Sport
- Sport: Athletics
- Event: Middle distance running
- Club: CIMA Pays d'Auray
- Coached by: Bruno Gajer

Achievements and titles
- Personal best: 800 m: 1:58.93 (2008)
Medal record
Women's athletics
Representing France
European U23 Championships
Silver medal – second place	2007 Debrecen	800 m
Bronze medal – third place	2005 Erfurt	800 m

Élodie Guégan (born 19 December 1985 in Ploemeur, Morbihan) is a French middle distance runner, who specialized in the 800 metres. She won two medals, silver and bronze, for the 800 metres at the 2005 European Athletics U23 Championships in Erfurt, Germany, and at the 2007 European Athletics U23 Championships in Debrecen, Hungary. She also set a personal best time of 1:58.93 by finishing fifth at the 2008 ÅF Golden League in Saint-Denis, Paris.

Guegan made her official debut for the 2008 Summer Olympics in Beijing, where she competed in the women's 800 metres. She ran in the third heat of the event, against six other athletes, including Kenya's Pamela Jelimo, who eventually became an Olympic champion in the final. She came only in third place by nine hundredths of a second (0.09) behind Jamaica's Kenia Sinclair, with a time of 2:03.85. Guegan advanced into the next round of the competition, as she secured the final mandatory qualifying slot in the third heat. Guegan, however, fell short in her bid for the final, as she did not finish the race in the third heat of the semifinal rounds.

She won the French National 800m championships in 2007 and the French National Indoors 800m championship also in 2007.
