= Athletics at the 2005 Summer Universiade – Women's 800 metres =

The women's 800 metres event at the 2005 Summer Universiade was held on 17–20 August in İzmir, Turkey.

== Medalists ==
Gold	Silver	Bronze
Svetlana Klyuka; Russia	Binnaz Uslu; Turkey	Marilyn Okoro; Great Britain

== Results ==
=== Heats ===
Rank	Heat	Athlete	Nationality	Time	Notes
1	4	Binnaz Uslu	Turkey	2:03.58	Q
2	1	Ewelina Sętowska-Dryk	Poland	2:04.67	Q
3	2	Sandra Teixeira	Portugal	2:04.97	Q
4	1	Teodora Kolarova	Bulgaria	2:05.00	Q
5	4	Marilyn Okoro	Great Britain	2:05.24	Q
6	2	Rebecca Lyne	Great Britain	2:05.40	Q
7	4	Aoife Byrne	Ireland	2:06.06	Q, SB
8	2	Antonella Riva	Italy	2:06.13	Q
9	1	Viktoriya Yalovtseva	Kazakhstan	2:06.28	Q
10	1	Mari Järvenpää	Finland	2:06.43	q
11	2	Anny Christofidou	Cyprus	2:06.68	q
12	4	Grace Ebor	Nigeria	2:06.99	q
13	2	Julia Howard	Canada	2:07.04	q
14	4	Natalya Lavshuk	Russia	2:07.36	
15	1	Petra Ptiček	Croatia	2:07.83	
16	3	Svetlana Klyuka	Russia	2:08.32	Q
17	3	Yuneisy Santiusty	Cuba	2:08.91	Q
18	4	Rebecca Johnstone	Canada	2:09.12	
19	2	Michelle Gibbs	United States Virgin Islands	2:11.22	
20	3	Liu Qing	China	2:11.55	Q
21	3	Buathip Boonprasert	Thailand	2:12.79	
22	3	Gabriela Sophoclaeus	Cyprus	2:14.06	
23	3	Gabriela Traña	Costa Rica	2:16.49	
24	2	Bouchra Nessaouri	Morocco	2:16.84	
25	2	Tianasom Rasdanirainy	Madagascar	2:26.64	
26	3	Argianany Nahr	Netherlands Antilles	2:27.15	
27	1	Sherma Aurelien	United States Virgin Islands	2:27.35	
28	3	Fati Larley	Ghana	2:29.39	
29	4	Maria-Pia Nehmé	Lebanon	2:32.75	
30	1	Stephanie Saleh	Lebanon	2:42.71	
	1	Choi Sut Ieng	Macau	DNS	
	3	Nelya Neporadna	Ukraine	DNS	
	4	Akuvi Degbotse-Goe	Togo	DNS	

=== Semifinals ===
Rank	Heat	Athlete	Nationality	Time	Notes
1	2	Svetlana Klyuka	Russia	2:01.62	Q
2	2	Liu Qing	China	2:02.34	Q
3	2	Binnaz Uslu	Turkey	2:02.35	Q
4	2	Rebecca Lyne	Great Britain	2:02.35	q
5	1	Sandra Teixeira	Portugal	2:03.11	Q
6	2	Teodora Kolarova	Bulgaria	2:03.24	q
7	1	Marilyn Okoro	Great Britain	2:03.29	Q
8	1	Ewelina Sętowska-Dryk	Poland	2:03.30	Q
9	1	Yuneisy Santiusty	Cuba	2:04.87	q
10	2	Mari Järvenpää	Finland	2:05.91	
11	1	Grace Ebor	Nigeria	2:06.63	
12	1	Anny Christofidou	Cyprus	2:06.85	
13	1	Antonella Riva	Italy	2:07.48	
14	1	Viktoriya Yalovtseva	Kazakhstan	2:08.02	
15	2	Julia Howard	Canada	2:08.23	
16	2	Aoife Byrne	Ireland	2:08.79	

=== Final ===
Rank	Athlete	Nationality	Time	Notes
1st place, gold medalist(s)	Svetlana Klyuka	Russia	2:00.80	
2nd place, silver medalist(s)	Binnaz Uslu	Turkey	2:01.42	SB
3rd place, bronze medalist(s)	Marilyn Okoro	Great Britain	2:01.90	SB
4	Liu Qing	China	2:02.27	
5	Ewelina Sętowska-Dryk	Poland	2:02.30	
6	Sandra Teixeira	Portugal	2:02.92	
7	Teodora Kolarova	Bulgaria	2:04.00	
8	Yuneisy Santiusty	Cuba	2:04.62	
9	Rebecca Lyne	Great Britain	2:05.03	
