= 2005 World Championships in Athletics – Women's 800 metres =

Women's 800 metres at the 2005 World Championships
- Venue: Helsinki Olympic Stadium
- Dates: 6 August (heats); 7 August (semifinals); 9 August (final)
- Competitors: 47 from 29 nations
- Winning time: 1:58.82

Medalists
gold medal	Zulia Calatayud; Cuba
silver medal	Hasna Benhassi; Morocco
bronze medal	Tatyana Andrianova; Russia

The women's 800 metres at the 2005 World Championships in Athletics was held on August 6, 7 and 9 at the Helsinki Olympic Stadium.

== Medals ==
Gold:	Silver:	Bronze:
Zulia Calatayud (Cuba)	Hasna Benhassi (Morocco)	Tatyana Andrianova (Russia)

== Results ==
All times shown are in seconds.

AR area record | CR championship record | GR games record | NR national record | OR Olympic record | PB personal best | SB season best | WL world leading (in a given season)
DNS = did not start | DQ = disqualification | NM = no mark (i.e. no valid result) | Q = qualification by place in heat | q = qualification by overall place

=== Heats ===
August 6, 2005

==== Heat 1 ====
1. (United States) Hazel Clark 2:01.91 Q
2. (Jamaica) Kenia Sinclair 2:02.18 Q
3. (Morocco) Mina Aït Hammou 2:02.36 Q
4. (Namibia) Agnes Samaria 2:02.46 Q
5. (Grenada) Neisha Bernard-Thomas 2:02.50
6. (Slovenia) Brigita Langerholc 2:03.06
7. (Turkey) Binnaz Uslu 2:03.73
8. (Gabon) Marlyse Nsourou 2:14.47 (SB)

==== Heat 2 ====
1. (Cuba) Zulia Calatayud 2:00.77 Q
2. (Morocco) Hasna Benhassi 2:00.77 Q
3. (United States) Kameisha Bennett 2:01.78 Q
4. (United Kingdom) Susan Scott 2:02.00 Q
5. (Bulgaria) Teodora Kolarova 2:02.45
6. (Japan) Miho Sato 2:02.82
7. (Uruguay) Marcela Britos 2:10.21
8. (Djibouti) Markabo Djama Liban 2:50.95

==== Heat 3 ====
1. (Russia) Tatyana Andrianova 2:06.38 Q
2. (United States) Alice Schmidt 2:07.10 Q
3. (Spain) Mayte Martínez 2:07.34 Q
4. (Poland) Ewelina Sętowska-Dryk 2:07.37 Q
5. (Myanmar) Myint Myint Aye 2:08.50
6. (Guyana) Marian Burnett 2:09.88
- (Algeria) Nahida Touhami DNS

==== Heat 4 ====
1. (Russia) Svetlana Cherkasova 2:00.62 Q
2. (France) Laetitia Valdonado 2:00.87 Q
3. (Belarus) Sviatlana Usovich 2:01.09 Q
4. (Slovakia) Lucia Klocová 2:01.63 Q (SB)
5. (Ukraine) Tetiana Petlyuk 2:01.78 q (SB)
6. (Morocco) Seltana Aït Hammou 2:02.16
7. (Italy) Elisa Cusma Piccione 2:05.95
8. (Pakistan) Gulnaz Ara 2:13.87 (SB)

==== Heat 5 ====
1. (Russia) Larisa Chzhao 2:00.64 Q
2. (Mozambique) Maria Mutola 2:00.71 Q
3. (Jamaica) Michelle Ballentine 2:01.05 Q (SB)
4. (Romania) Mihaela Neacsu 2:01.35 Q
5. (Germany) Monika Gradzki 2:01.56 q
6. (Suriname) Letitia Vriesde 2:01.65 q (SB)
7. (Canada) Diane Cummins 2:01.71 q
- (Ghana) Akosua Serwaa DNS

=== Semifinals ===
August 7, 2005

==== Heat 1 ====
1. (United States) Hazel Clark 1:59.00 Q
2. (Russia) Larisa Chzhao 1:59.07 Q
3. (Mozambique) Maria Mutola 1:59.29 q
4. (Spain) Mayte Martínez 1:59.40 q (SB)
5. (Morocco) Mina Aït Hammou 2:00.22
6. (Romania) Mihaela Neacsu 2:00.63
7. (Slovakia) Lucia Klocová 2:00.64 (SB)
8. (United Kingdom) Susan Scott 2:01.17 (SB)

==== Heat 2 ====
1. (Cuba) Zulia Calatayud 1:57.92 Q (SB)
2. (Russia) Svetlana Cherkasova 1:58.58 Q
3. (Jamaica) Kenia Sinclair 1:59.45
4. (Canada) Diane Cummins 2:00.10 (SB)
5. (Namibia) Agnes Samaria 2:00.13
6. (United States) Alice Schmidt 2:01.43
7. (Suriname) Letitia Vriesde 2:02.07
8. (Germany) Monika Gradzki 2:02.09

==== Heat 3 ====
1. (Russia) Tatyana Andrianova 2:01.35 Q
2. (Morocco) Hasna Benhassi 2:01.59 Q
3. (France) Laetitia Valdonado 2:01.90
4. (Poland) Ewelina Sętowska-Dryk 2:02.02
5. (Belarus) Sviatlana Usovich 2:02.34
6. (Ukraine) Tetiana Petlyuk 2:02.46
7. (Jamaica) Michelle Ballentine 2:03.98
- (United States) Kameisha Bennett DNF

=== Final ===
August 9, 2005

1. (Cuba) Zulia Calatayud 1:58.82
2. (Morocco) Hasna Benhassi 1:59.42
3. (Russia) Tatyana Andrianova 1:59.60
4. (Mozambique) Maria Mutola 1:59.71
5. (Spain) Mayte Martínez 1:59.99
6. (Russia) Larisa Chzhao 2:00.25
7. (Russia) Svetlana Cherkasova 2:00.71
8. (United States) Hazel Clark 2:01.52
