= 2007 European Athletics Indoor Championships – Women's 800 metres =

The Women's 800 metres event at the 2007 European Athletics Indoor Championships was held on March 2–4.

== Medalists ==
Gold	Silver	Bronze
Oksana Zbrozhek; Russia	Tetyana Petlyuk; Ukraine	Jolanda Čeplak; Slovenia

== Results ==
=== Heats ===
First 2 of each heat (Q) and the next 4 fastest (q) qualified for the semifinals.

Rank	Heat	Name	Nationality	Time	Notes
1	4	Jolanda Čeplak	Slovenia	2:03.82	Q
2	4	Liliana Popescu	Romania	2:03.92	Q
3	4	Yuliya Krevsun	Ukraine	2:03.07	q
4	4	Elisa Cusma Piccione	Italy	2:03.34	q
5	4	Rikke Albertsen	Denmark	2:03.46	q
6	4	Margarita Fuentes-Pila	Spain	2:03.58	q, PB
7	1	Oksana Zbrozhek	Russia	2:03.67	Q
8	3	Aneta Lemiesz	Poland	2:03.68	Q
9	3	Jenny Meadows	Great Britain	2:03.68	Q
10	3	Mihaela Neacsu	Romania	2:03.72	
11	1	Marilyn Okoro	Great Britain	2:04.53	Q
12	3	Mariya Dryakhlova	Russia	2:04.54	
13	1	Teodora Kolarova	Bulgaria	2:04.61	
14	1	Ewelina Sętowska-Dryk	Poland	2:04.66	
15	2	Tetyana Petlyuk	Ukraine	2:05.44	Q
16	2	Brigita Langerholc	Slovenia	2:05.95	Q
17	3	Suvi Selvenius	Finland	2:06.10	
18	1	Montse Mas	Spain	2:06.68	
19	3	Jana Hartmann	Germany	2:06.72	
20	1	Egle Uljas	Estonia	2:07.93	
	2	Eleni Filandra	Greece	DNF	Q
	2	Maria Carmo Tavares	Portugal	DNF	Q
	2	Karen Harewood	Great Britain	DNF	
	2	Mariya Shapayeva	Russia	DQ	

=== Semifinals ===
First 3 of each semifinals qualified directly (Q) for the final.

Rank	Heat	Name	Nationality	Time	Notes
1	1	Oksana Zbrozhek	Russia	1:59.53	Q
2	1	Jolanda Čeplak	Slovenia	1:59.84	Q
3	1	Marilyn Okoro	Great Britain	1:59.87	Q, PB
4	2	Tetyana Petlyuk	Ukraine	2:00.10	Q
5	2	Jenny Meadows	Great Britain	2:00.79	Q
6	2	Brigita Langerholc	Slovenia	2:01.00	Q
7	1	Yuliya Krevsun	Ukraine	2:01.04	PB
8	2	Aneta Lemiesz	Poland	2:01.39	
9	2	Elisa Cusma Piccione	Italy	2:01.42	
10	1	Liliana Popescu	Romania	2:02.33	
11	1	Rikke Albertsen	Denmark	2:02.70	PB
12	2	Margarita Fuentes-Pila	Spain	2:03.91	
13	2	Eleni Filandra	Greece	2:05.32	
14	1	Maria Carmo Tavares	Portugal	2:09.75	

=== Final ===
Rank	Name	Nationality	Time	Notes
1st place, gold medalist(s)	Oksana Zbrozhek	Russia	1:59.23	
2nd place, silver medalist(s)	Tetyana Petlyuk	Ukraine	1:59.84	
3rd place, bronze medalist(s)	Jolanda Čeplak	Slovenia	2:00.00	
4	Marilyn Okoro	Great Britain	2:00.20	
5	Jenny Meadows	Great Britain	2:00.25	
6	Brigita Langerholc	Slovenia	2:01.24	
