= 2006 European Athletics Championships – Women's 800 metres =

Women's 800 metres at the European Athletics Championships

The women's 800 metres at the 2006 European Athletics Championships were held at the Ullevi on August 7, 8 and August 10.

Klyuka was ahead with another athlete already in a medal position, but on the final bend Kotlyarova found herself boxed in. Lyne had already made a dash for home, and Kotlyarova had to push her out the way to start her sprint. Kotlyarova made a great dash and went in front of the other two Russians and an athlete from Ukraine. Lyne started sprinting and overtook the Ukrainian athlete, just pipping her into 3rd place.

== Medalists ==
Gold	Silver	Bronze
Olga Kotlyarova; Russia	Svetlana Klyuka; Russia	Rebecca Lyne; Great Britain

== Schedule ==
Date	Time	Round
August 7, 2006	17:50	Round 1
August 8, 2006	17:45	Semifinals
August 10, 2006	20:05	Final

== Results ==
KEY:	q	Fastest non-qualifiers	Q	Qualified	NR	National record	PB	Personal best	SB	Seasonal best

=== Round 1 ===
Qualification: First 3 in each heat (Q) and the next 4 fastest (q) advance to the semifinals.

Rank	Heat	Name	Nationality	Time	Notes
1	3	Olga Kotlyarova	Russia	2:01.01	Q
2	3	Jolanda Čeplak	Slovenia	2:01.08	Q
3	3	Jemma Simpson	Great Britain	2:01.55	Q
4	1	Mayte Martínez	Spain	2:01.71	Q
5	1	Svetlana Cherkasova	Russia	2:01.82	Q
6	2	Rebecca Lyne	Great Britain	2:01.87	Q
6	3	Liliana Barbulescu-Popescu	Romania	2:01.87	q
8	2	Tetiana Petlyuk	Ukraine	2:01.90	Q
9	1	Teodora Kolarova	Bulgaria	2:01.94	Q
10	1	Aneta Lemiesz	Poland	2:02.11	q
11	2	Ewelina Sętowska	Poland	2:02.43	Q
12	2	Rikke Rønholt	Denmark	2:02.68	q
13	2	Élisabeth Grousselle	France	2:02.69	q
14	4	Svetlana Klyuka	Russia	2:02.92	Q
15	4	Brigita Langerholc	Slovenia	2:03.04	Q
16	4	Lucia Klocová	Slovakia	2:03.17	Q
17	1	Mihaela Neacsu	Romania	2:03.42	
18	3	Vanja Perišić	Croatia	2:03.53	
19	1	Monika Gradzki	Germany	2:03.64	
20	2	Sandra Teixeira	Portugal	2:04.73	
21	3	Virginie Fouquet	France	2:05.62	
22	4	Elisa Cusma	Italy	2:06.37	q
23	4	Esther Desviat	Spain	2:07.11	
24	1	Anny Christofidou	Cyprus	2:11.70	
25	4	Amanda Pritchard	Great Britain	2:12.32	q
	4	Maria do Carmo Tavares	Portugal	DQ	

=== Semifinals ===
First 3 in each heat (Q) and the next 2 fastest (q) advance to the Final.

Rank	Heat	Name	Nationality	Time	Notes
2	2	Svetlana Klyuka	Russia	1:58.80	Q
3	2	Rebecca Lyne	Great Britain	1:59.11	Q
3	2	Brigita Langerholc	Slovenia	1:59.45	Q, SB
4	2	Tetiana Petlyuk	Ukraine	1:59.84	q
5	1	Olga Kotlyarova	Russia	2:00.03	Q
6	1	Svetlana Cherkasova	Russia	2:00.05	Q
7	2	Teodora Kolarova	Bulgaria	2:00.42	q, PB
8	1	Mayte Martínez	Spain	2:00.59	Q
9	1	Ewelina Sętowska	Poland	2:00.60	
10	1	Lucia Klocová	Slovakia	2:00.63	SB
11	1	Jemma Simpson	Great Britain	2:01.12	
12	1	Elisa Cusma	Italy	2:01.17	
13	1	Rikke Rønholt	Denmark	2:01.17	
14	2	Aneta Lemiesz	Poland	2:01.25	
15	2	Liliana Barbulescu-Popescu	Romania	2:01.52	SB
16	1	Jolanda Čeplak	Slovenia	2:02.59	
	2	Élisabeth Grousselle	France	DNF	
	2	Amanda Pritchard	Great Britain	DNS	

=== Final ===
Rank	Name	Nationality	Time	Notes
1st place, gold medalist(s)	Olga Kotlyarova	Russia	1:57.38	
2nd place, silver medalist(s)	Svetlana Klyuka	Russia	1:57.48	
3rd place, bronze medalist(s)	Rebecca Lyne	Great Britain	1:58.45	
4	Tetiana Petlyuk	Ukraine	1:58.65	
5	Brigita Langerholc	Slovenia	1:59.30	SB
6	Teodora Kolarova	Bulgaria	2:00.00	PB
7	Mayte Martínez	Spain	2:00.10	
8	Svetlana Cherkasova	Russia	2:03.43	
