= 2005 European Athletics Indoor Championships – Women's 800 metres =

The Women's 800 metres event at the 2005 European Athletics Indoor Championships was held on March 4–6.

== Medalists ==
Gold	Silver	Bronze
Larisa Chzhao; Russia	Mayte Martínez; Spain	Natalya Tsyganova; Russia

== Results ==
=== Heats ===
First 2 of each heat (Q) and the next 4 fastest (q) qualified for the semifinals.

Rank	Heat	Name	Nationality	Time	Notes
1	4	Mayte Martínez	Spain	2:03.06	Q
2	4	Ewelina Sętowska	Poland	2:03.11	Q, PB
3	4	Sandra Stals	Belgium	2:03.16	q
4	2	Larisa Chzhao	Russia	2:03.41	Q
5	4	Maria Carmo Tavares	Portugal	2:03.47	q, PB
6	2	Monika Gradzki	Germany	2:03.75	Q
7	2	Nédia Semedo	Portugal	2:03.77	q, SB
8	2	Tetyana Petlyuk	Ukraine	2:03.85	q
9	1	Irina Vashentseva	Russia	2:04.02	Q
10	1	Claudia Gesell	Germany	2:04.31	Q
11	4	Brigita Langerholc	Slovenia	2:04.54	
12	3	Natalya Tsyganova	Russia	2:04.57	Q
13	3	Laetitia Valdonado	France	2:04.95	Q
14	2	Alexia Oberstolz	Italy	2:05.06	
15	3	Jolanda Čeplak	Slovenia	2:05.27	
16	1	Virginie Fouquet	France	2:05.30	
17	1	Esther Desviat	Spain	2:05.48	
18	3	Janina Goldfuß	Germany	2:05.64	
19	1	Rikke Rønholt	Denmark	2:05.69	
20	3	Anny Christofidou	Cyprus	2:06.81	NR
21	3	Maria Papadopoulou	Greece	2:08.63	

=== Semifinals ===
First 3 of each heat (Q) qualified directly for the final.

Rank	Heat	Name	Nationality	Time	Notes
1	1	Larisa Chzhao	Russia	2:03.47	Q
2	1	Natalya Tsyganova	Russia	2:03.75	Q
3	1	Monika Gradzki	Germany	2:03.79	Q
4	1	Nédia Semedo	Portugal	2:04.35	
5	1	Sandra Stals	Belgium	2:08.46	
6	1	Laetitia Valdonado	France	2:09.73	
7	2	Irina Vashentseva	Russia	2:10.40	Q
8	2	Claudia Gesell	Germany	2:10.51	Q
9	2	Mayte Martínez	Spain	2:10.66	Q
10	2	Maria Carmo Tavares	Portugal	2:10.94	
11	2	Tetyana Petlyuk	Ukraine	2:11.09	
12	2	Ewelina Sętowska	Poland	2:11.43	

=== Final ===
Rank	Name	Nationality	Time	Notes
1st place, gold medalist(s)	Larisa Chzhao	Russia	1:59.97	
2nd place, silver medalist(s)	Mayte Martínez	Spain	2:00.52	
3rd place, bronze medalist(s)	Natalya Tsyganova	Russia	2:01.62	
4	Irina Vashentseva	Russia	2:01.84	
5	Monika Gradzki	Germany	2:02.53	
6	Claudia Gesell	Germany	2:04.06	
