= Janeth Jepkosgei =

Kenyan middle-distance runner

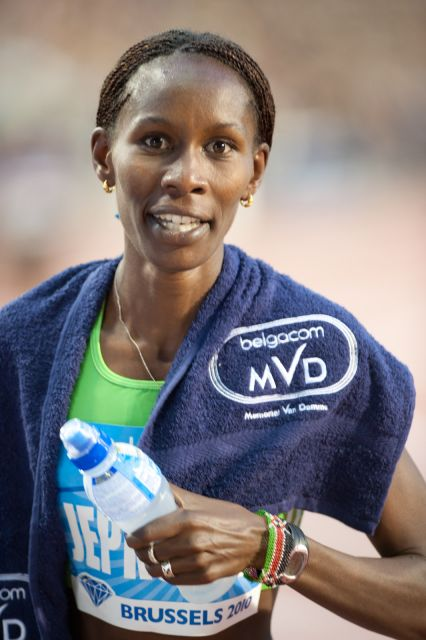
- Jepkosgei at the 2010 Memorial Van Damme.

Personal information
- Nationality: Kenya
- Born: Janeth Jepkosgei Busienei; 13 December 1983 (age 42) Kabirirsang, Kenya

Sport
- Sport: Track and field
- Event: 800 metres
Medal record
Women's athletics
Representing Kenya
Olympic Games
Silver medal – second place	2008 Beijing	800 m
World Championships
Gold medal – first place	2007 Osaka	800 m
Silver medal – second place	2009 Berlin	800 m
Silver medal – second place	2011 Daegu	800 m
African Championships
Gold medal – first place	2006 Bambous	800 m
Silver medal – second place	2010 Nairobi	800 m
Silver medal – second place	2010 Nairobi	4×400 m
Silver medal – second place	2014 Marrakesh	800 m
Silver medal – second place	2014 Marrakesh	4×400 m
Commonwealth Games
Gold medal – first place	2006 Melbourne	800 m
Continental Cup
Gold medal – first place	2010 Split	800 m
Silver medal – second place	2006 Athens	800 m
World Junior Championships
Gold medal – first place	2002 Kingston	800 m

Janeth Jepkosgei Busienei (born 13 December 1983) is a Kenyan middle distance runner and former world champion.

== Early career ==
Janeth, nicknamed "Eldoret Express" is from the Kenyan village of Kabirirsang, near Kapsabet. Famous athletes Wilson Kipketer and Wilfred Bungei are also from the same village. She started athletics while at Kapsumbeiywo Primary School and took several events. Since 1998 she attended Sing'ore Girls High School near Iten, famous for producing Kenyan women athletes. She won national secondary school championship in heptathlon, while still at form one. Her record from that event still stood in 2012. Her speciality at the time was actually 400 m hurdles. She attended the Kenyan trials for 1999 World Youth Championships, but as 400 m hurdles was not competed at the trials, she opted to take part in 800 m. She finished second and was selected for the Kenyan team, but failed to reach the final of 800 m competition in World Youth Championships held in Bydgoszcz, Poland.

In 2000 Jepkosgei won two gold medals at national secondary school championships, the events were 400 m hurdles and 800 m. At the East Africa Youth Championships held in the same year she won 400 m hurdles, while at 800 m she finished second.

She joined IOC-sponsored High Performance Training Centre in Eldoret in 2001. She was then coached by 1988 olympic gold medalist Paul Ereng. The same year, she took 800 m silver medal at the African Junior Championships, and the next year she took 800 m gold medal at the World Junior Championships in Kingston, Jamaica.

Janeth Jepkosgei took part at the 2003 All-Africa Games, but failed to reach the 800 m final. In 2004, she won Kenyan Olympic trials at 800 m, but was not selected since she failed to beat qualifying time. The history repeated itself in 2005, when she won 800 m at national trials, but did not secure an "A"-qualifying time. She did beat the "B"-qualifying time, but Athletics Kenya did not send her or any other Kenyan 800 m female runner to represent Kenya at the world championships.

== Reaching global top ==
Her breakthrough year was 2006. On 24 March 2006 she won the women's 800 m event at the 2006 Commonwealth Games with a time of 1 minute, 57.88 seconds. She managed to beat veteran runner Maria de Lurdes Mutola of Mozambique. Later that same year she won African Championships in Athletics at the 800 m event. She also broke the Kenyan 800 m women's record twice. Jepkosgei was awarded the 2006 Kenyan Sportswoman of the Year award.

Jepkosgei made Kenyan History on 28 August 2007, where she won gold in the World Championship 800 m final in Osaka, becoming the first female Kenyan middle distance runner to achieve gold over 800 m. She led from start to finish to win in a time of 1 minute, 56.04 seconds, beating the Kenyan record and world leading time (1.56,18) she had set at the heats two days earlier. She retained the Kenyan Sportswoman of the Year award.

On 24 May 2008 the 19-year-old Pamela Jelimo set a new Kenyan record of 1:55.76, beating the one previously held by Jepkosgei. Jelimo's dominance throughout the season prevented Jepkosgei from major victories, but won Olympic silver medal over 800 m.

She collided with Caster Semenya of South Africa such that Jepkosgei fell and finished last in her heat at the 2009 World Championships. However, after a successful protest, she was allowed to run in the semi-finals and eventually achieved silver medal, well behind the winner Semenya.

Jepkosgei started her 2010 season by a win at the Diamond League meeting in Shanghai, China.

Her father Michael Busienei was an 800 m runner, as is her younger brother Dennis Kiprotich.

Jepkosgei is now coached by Claudio Berardelli. Her manager is Federico Rosa.

== Achievements ==
Year	Competition	Venue	Position	Event	Notes
Representing Kenya
2002	World Junior Championships	Kingston, Jamaica	1st	800 m	2:00.80
2006	Commonwealth Games	Melbourne, Australia	1st	800 m	1:57.88
2006	African Championships	Bambous, Mauritius	1st	800 m	2:00.64
2006	World Athletics Final	Stuttgart, Germany	2nd	800 m	1:59.10
2006	IAAF World Cup	Athens, Greece	2nd	800 m	2:00.09
2007	World Championships	Osaka, Japan	1st	800 m	1:56.04
2007	World Athletics Final	Stuttgart, Germany	1st	800 m	1:57.87
2008	Olympic Games	Beijing, China	2nd	800 m	1:56.07
2008	World Athletics Final	Stuttgart, Germany	2nd	800 m	1:58.41
2009	World Championships	Berlin, Germany	2nd	800 m	1:57.90
2011	World Championships	Daegu, South Korea	2nd	800 m	1:57.42
2015	World Championships	Beijing, China	26th (h)	800 m	2:01.40

== Personal best ==
- 800 metres – 1:56.04 (2007)
- 1000 metres – 2:37.98 (2002)
- 1500 metres – 4:02.32 (2011)
- One Mile – 4:28.72 (2008)
