= 2002 World Junior Championships in Athletics – Women's 800 metres =

The women's 800 metres event at the 2002 World Junior Championships in Athletics was held in Kingston, Jamaica, at National Stadium on 17 and 19 July.

== Medalists ==
Gold	Janeth Jepkosgei; Kenya
Silver	Lucia Klocová; Slovakia
Bronze	Juliana de Azevedo; Brazil

== Results ==
=== Final ===
19 July

Rank	Name	Nationality	Time	Notes
1st place, gold medalist(s)	Janeth Jepkosgei	Kenya	2:00.80	
2nd place, silver medalist(s)	Lucia Klocová	Slovakia	2:01.73	
3rd place, bronze medalist(s)	Juliana de Azevedo	Brazil	2:03.81	
4	Jemma Simpson	United Kingdom	2:04.11	
5	Kitty Cziráki	Hungary	2:04.44	
6	Kathrin Trauth	Germany	2:05.49	
7	Natasha Pantelyeva	Russia	2:08.36	
8	Berhane Herpassa	Ethiopia	2:11.08	

=== Heats ===
17 July

==== Heat 1 ====
Rank	Name	Nationality	Time	Notes
1	Lucia Klocová	Slovakia	2:06.20	Q
2	Juliana de Azevedo	Brazil	2:06.23	Q
3	Yusneysy Santiuste	Cuba	2:06.60	
4	Simona Barcau	Romania	2:06.97	
5	Sajida Ramzan	Pakistan	2:16.61	
6	Sharon Soussi	Gibraltar	2:22.14	

==== Heat 2 ====
Rank	Name	Nationality	Time	Notes
1	Janeth Jepkosgei	Kenya	2:04.51	Q
2	Natasha Pantelyeva	Russia	2:05.18	Q
3	Jemma Simpson	United Kingdom	2:05.60	q
4	Kitty Cziráki	Hungary	2:06.51	q
5	Naoual Baiby	Morocco	2:07.90	
	Stacey Ann Livingston	Jamaica	DNF	

==== Heat 3 ====
Rank	Name	Nationality	Time	Notes
1	Berhane Herpassa	Ethiopia	2:06.76	Q
2	Kathrin Trauth	Germany	2:07.11	Q
3	Najla Jaber	Netherlands	2:08.17	
4	Amal Zaytouni	Morocco	2:09.40	
5	Peudo Japhet	Tanzania	2:09.77	
6	Martine Nobili	Luxembourg	2:10.19	
7	Carlene Robinson	Jamaica	2:10.82	

== Participation ==
According to an unofficial count, 19 athletes from 17 countries participated in the event.

- Brazil (1)
- Cuba (1)
- Ethiopia (1)
- Germany (1)
- Gibraltar (1)
- Hungary (1)
- Jamaica (2)
- Kenya (1)
- Luxembourg (1)
- Morocco (2)
- Netherlands (1)
- Pakistan (1)
- Romania (1)
- Russia (1)
- Slovakia (1)
- Tanzania (1)
- United Kingdom (1)
