= Kapchemoiywo =

Coordinates: 0°2′N 35°17′E

Kapchemoiywo is a village in Kilibwoni in Nandi County, Kenya. It is located 2-3 kilometres west of Kabirirsang village.

Kapchemoiywo is part of Kaplamai location of Kilibwoni division of Nandi County. Its local authority is Nandi County Government and constituency is Emgwen. Kapchemoiywo is the birthplace of Wilson Kipketer.
