= Esther Desviat =

Spanish middle-distance runner

Esther Desviat Ponce (born 27 January 1982 in Madrid), is a Spanish athlete specialising in the middle-distance events. She represented her country at one outdoor and three indoor World Championships. She won the 800 metres bronze at the 2003 European U23 Championships.

== Competition record ==
Year	Competition	Venue	Position	Event	Notes
Representing Spain
1998	World Youth Games	Moscow, Russia	2nd	800 m	2:07.05
1998	World Youth Games	Moscow, Russia	5th	4 × 400 m relay	3:58.88
1999	World Youth Championships	Bydgoszcz, Poland	7th	800 m	2:16.23
1999	European Junior Championships	Riga, Latvia	13th (h)	800 m	2:08.92
2000	World Junior Championships	Santiago, Chile	5th	800 m	2:06.55
2000	World Junior Championships	Santiago, Chile	–	1500 m	DNF
2001	European Junior Championships	Grosseto, Italy	12th (h)	800 m	2:08.10
2002	European Indoor Championships	Vienna, Austria	7th (h)	800 m	2:02.86
2003	World Indoor Championships	Birmingham, United Kingdom	12th (h)	800 m	2:04.96
2003	European U23 Championships	Bydgoszcz, Poland	3rd	800 m	2:05.38
2003	World Championships	Paris, France	20th (h)	800 m	2:03.42
2004	World Indoor Championships	Budapest, Hungary	18th (h)	800 m	2:05.66
2004	Ibero-American Championships	Huelva, Spain	7th	800 m	2:04.29
2005	European Indoor Championships	Madrid, Spain	17th (h)	800 m	2:05.48
2005	Mediterranean Games	Almería, Spain	6th	800 m	2:03.75
2006	European Championships	Gothenburg, Sweden	23rd (h)	800 m	2:07.11
2007	European Indoor Championships	Birmingham, United Kingdom	14th (h)	1500 m	4:21.07
2008	World Indoor Championships	Valencia, Spain	18th (h)	1500 m	4:33.71
2009	European Indoor Championships	Turin, Italy	11th (h)	1500 m	4:12.94

== Personal bests ==
Outdoor

- 800 metres – 2:00.76 (Lausanne 2003)
- 1500 metres – 4:11.79 (Castellón 2009)
- 3000 metres – 9:44.68 (Arganda del Rey 2014)

Indoor

- 800 metres – 2:02.52 (Seville 2003)
- 1000 metres – 2:41.04 (Madrid 2005)
- 1500 metres – 4:10.64 (Valencia 2009)
- 3000 metres – 9:20.59 (Valencia 2010)
