= 2003 European Athletics U23 Championships – Women's 800 metres =

The women's 800 metres event at the 2003 European Athletics U23 Championships was held in Bydgoszcz, Poland, at Zawisza Stadion on 18 and 20 July.

== Medalists ==
| Gold | Rebecca Lyne; United Kingdom |
| Silver | Lucia Klocová; Slovakia |
| Bronze | Esther Desviat; Spain |

== Results ==
=== Final ===
20 July

| Rank | Name | Nationality | Time | Notes |
|---|---|---|---|---|
| 1st place, gold medalist(s) | Rebecca Lyne | United Kingdom | 2:04.66 | |
| 2nd place, silver medalist(s) | Lucia Klocová | Slovakia | 2:05.02 | |
| 3rd place, bronze medalist(s) | Esther Desviat | Spain | 2:05.38 | |
| 4 | Mihaela Olaru | Romania | 2:06.12 | |
| 5 | Joanna Kaczor | Poland | 2:06.39 | |
| 6 | Alina Ripanu | Romania | 2:06.41 | |
| 7 | Tetyana Petlyuk | Ukraine | 2:06.57 | |
| 8 | Joanna Buza | Poland | 2:06.75 | |

=== Heats ===
18 July
Qualified: first 2 in each heat and 2 best to the Final

==== Heat 1 ====
| Rank | Name | Nationality | Time | Notes |
|---|---|---|---|---|
| 1 | Rebecca Lyne | United Kingdom | 2:03.53 | Q |
| 2 | Joanna Buza | Poland | 2:04.28 | Q |
| 3 | Svitlana Chervan | Ukraine | 2:05.96 | |
| 4 | Anny Christofidou | Cyprus | 2:06.53 | |
| 5 | Patricia Conde | Spain | 2:09.46 | |
| 6 | Daniela Cîmpanu | Romania | 2:09.83 | |

==== Heat 2 ====
| Rank | Name | Nationality | Time | Notes |
|---|---|---|---|---|
| 1 | Mihaela Olaru | Romania | 2:05.18 | Q |
| 2 | Lucia Klocová | Slovakia | 2:05.35 | Q |
| 3 | Svetlana Sidunova | Russia | 2:05.58 | |
| 4 | Beata Rudzińska | Poland | 2:06.21 | |
| 5 | Catherine Riley | United Kingdom | 2:08.97 | |

==== Heat 3 ====
| Rank | Name | Nationality | Time | Notes |
|---|---|---|---|---|
| 1 | Esther Desviat | Spain | 2:02.77 | Q |
| 2 | Alina Ripanu | Romania | 2:02.83 | Q |
| 3 | Tetyana Petlyuk | Ukraine | 2:02.93 | q |
| 4 | Joanna Kaczor | Poland | 2:03.06 | q |
| 5 | Petra Ptiček | Croatia | 2:06.52 | |

== Participation ==
According to an unofficial count, 16 athletes from 9 countries participated in the event.

- Croatia (1)
- Cyprus (1)
- Poland (3)
- Romania (3)
- Russia (1)
- Slovakia (1)
- Spain (2)
- Ukraine (2)
- United Kingdom (2)
