= Hong Mei =

Hong Mei or Mei Hong is the name of:

Surnamed Hong

- Mei Hong (chemist) (born 1970), Chinese-American chemist
- Hong Mei (athlete) (born 1982), Chinese shot putter

Surnamed Mei

- Mei Hong (computer scientist) (born 1963), Chinese computer scientist

== See also ==
- Hongmei (disambiguation)
