= 2000 World Junior Championships in Athletics – Women's 800 metres =

The women's 800 metres event at the 2000 World Junior Championships in Athletics was held in Santiago, Chile, at Estadio Nacional Julio Martínez Prádanos on 17, 18 and 20 October.

== Medalists ==
Gold	Nancy Jebet Langat; Kenya
Silver	Georgie Clarke; Australia
Bronze	Lucia Klocová; Slovakia

== Results ==
=== Final ===
20 October

Rank	Name	Nationality	Time	Notes
1st place, gold medalist(s)	Nancy Jebet Langat	Kenya	2:01.51	
2nd place, silver medalist(s)	Georgie Clarke	Australia	2:02.28	
3rd place, bronze medalist(s)	Lucia Klocová	Slovakia	2:04.00	
4	Alina Rîpanu	Romania	2:04.60	
5	Esther Desviat	Spain	2:06.55	
6	Tatyana Petlyuk	Ukraine	2:07.26	
7	Jeruto Kiptum	Kenya	2:08.97	
	Kerstin Werner	Germany	DNS	

=== Semifinals ===
18 October

==== Semifinal 1 ====
Rank	Name	Nationality	Time	Notes
1	Lucia Klocová	Slovakia	2:06.77	Q
2	Nancy Jebet Langat	Kenya	2:06.82	Q
3	Tatyana Petlyuk	Ukraine	2:07.29	Q
4	Kerstin Werner	Germany	2:07.31	q
5	Miki Nishimura	Japan	2:08.34	
6	Gulmira Tasybekova	Kazakhstan	2:08.62	
7	Norica Manafu	Romania	2:11.96	
8	Alice Goodberg	Australia	2:14.40	

==== Semifinal 2 ====
Rank	Name	Nationality	Time	Notes
1	Georgie Clarke	Australia	2:06.53	Q
2	Alina Rîpanu	Romania	2:06.67	Q
3	Esther Desviat	Spain	2:06.83	Q
4	Jeruto Kiptum	Kenya	2:07.35	q
5	Mieke Geens	Belgium	2:07.46	
6	Svetlana Chervan	Ukraine	2:09.67	
7	Marija Papic	Yugoslavia	2:10.09	
8	Mari Järvenpää	Finland	2:10.51	

=== Heats ===
17 October

==== Heat 1 ====
Rank	Name	Nationality	Time	Notes
1	Gulmira Tasybekova	Kazakhstan	2:06.48	Q
2	Jeruto Kiptum	Kenya	2:07.86	Q
3	Alice Goodberg	Australia	2:08.81	Q
4	Norica Manafu	Romania	2:09.47	q
5	Sheena Gooding	Barbados	2:11.17	
	Irina Latve	Latvia	DNF	

==== Heat 2 ====
Rank	Name	Nationality	Time	Notes
1	Nancy Jebet Langat	Kenya	2:07.79	Q
2	Kerstin Werner	Germany	2:07.82	Q
3	Esther Desviat	Spain	2:08.41	Q
4	Mari Järvenpää	Finland	2:09.39	q
5	Svetlana Chervan	Ukraine	2:09.50	q
6	Direma Banasso	Togo	2:16.54	

==== Heat 3 ====
Rank	Name	Nationality	Time	Notes
1	Alina Rîpanu	Romania	2:08.35	Q
2	Mieke Geens	Belgium	2:08.78	Q
3	Miki Nishimura	Japan	2:08.79	Q
4	Marija Papic	Yugoslavia	2:09.77	q
5	Tanya Wright	Canada	2:11.23	
6	Rebecca Lyne	United Kingdom	2:20.17	
	Getrude Banda	Malawi	DQ	

==== Heat 4 ====
Rank	Name	Nationality	Time	Notes
1	Georgie Clarke	Australia	2:10.11	Q
2	Lucia Klocová	Slovakia	2:10.20	Q
3	Tatyana Petlyuk	Ukraine	2:10.41	Q
4	Joanna Ross	United Kingdom	2:10.56	
5	Joanna Buza	Poland	2:10.78	
6	Euridice Semedo	São Tomé and Príncipe	2:11.78	

== Participation ==
According to an unofficial count, 25 athletes from 20 countries participated in the event.

- Australia (2)
- Barbados (1)
- Belgium (1)
- Canada (1)
- Finland (1)
- Germany (1)
- Japan (1)
- Kazakhstan (1)
- Kenya (2)
- Latvia (1)
- Malawi (1)
- Poland (1)
- Romania (2)
- São Tomé and Príncipe (1)
- Slovakia (1)
- Spain (1)
- Togo (1)
- Ukraine (2)
- United Kingdom (2)
- Yugoslavia (1)
