= Mayte Martínez =

Spanish athletics competitor (born 1976)

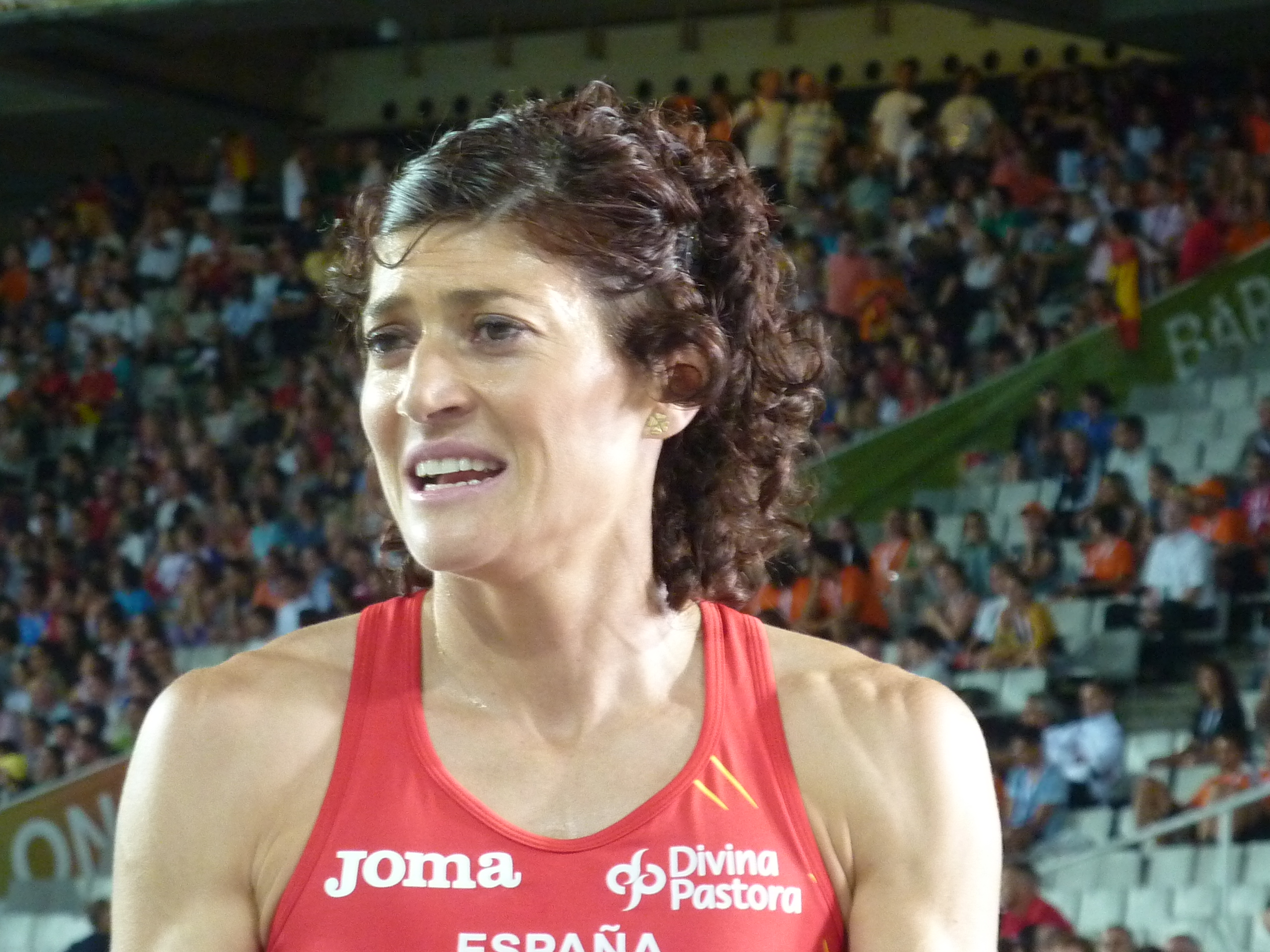
- Mayte Martínez in 2010

Medal record

Women's Athletics

Representing Spain

World Championships
Bronze medal – third place	2007 Osaka	800 m

World Indoor Championships
Bronze medal – third place	2003 Birmingham	800 m

European Championships
Silver medal – second place	2002 Munich	800 m

European Indoor Championships
Silver medal – second place	2005 Madrid	800 m

Mediterranean Games
Gold medal – first place	2005 Almería	4x400 m relay

Ibero-American Championships
Silver medal – second place	2000 Rio de Janeiro	800 m
Silver medal – second place	2004 Huelva	800 m

María Teresa "Mayte" Martínez Jiménez (born 17 May 1976 in Valladolid) is a Spanish athlete who competed predominantly in the 800 metres, with her greatest period of success between 2000 and 2010. A multiple medalist at World and European level, indoors and out, she was a member of the Spanish 4 x 400 metre relay team which won the gold medal at the 2005 Mediterranean Games in Almeira, Spain, her only major international championship gold medal.

Martinez reached four finals in five editions of the World Championships (she did not take part on 2003 Championships in Paris), winning the bronze medal in the 800 metres in Osaka in 2007. Indoors she achieved the same colour of medal in the 2023 World Indoor Athletics Championships in Birmngham.

She represented her country in both the 2000 and 2004 Olympic Games, but was eliminated in the semi-finals on each occasion. She was unable to participate in the 2008 Olympic Games in Beijing due to an injury (plantar fasciitis) and while she remained competitive at elite level, reaching World and European finals in 2009 and 2010, her senior international career came to an end in the latter year at the age of 34, after the 2010 European Athletics Championships held in her home country, Spain.

== Personal bests ==
Outdoor

- 400 metres 53.67 Valladolid (01/05/2003)
- 800 metres 1:57.62 Osaka (28/08/2007)
- 1000 metres 2:33.06 Huelva (13/09/2007)
- 1500 metres 4:05.05 Rieti (28/08/2005)

Indoor

- 800 metres 1:59.52 Gent (08/02/2004)
- 1000 metres 2:38.80 Madrid (24/02/2005)
- 1500 metres 4:09.18 Birmingham, GBR (03/03/2007)

== Competition record ==
Year	Competition	Venue	Position	Event	Notes
Representing Spain
1994	World Junior Championships	Lisbon, Portugal	11th (sf)	800 m	2:07.00
1995	European Junior Championships	Nyíregyháza, Hungary	6th	800 m	2:05.00
2000	Ibero-American Championships	Rio de Janeiro, Brazil	2nd	800 m	2:04.02
2000	Olympic Games	Sydney, Australia	15th (sf)	800 m	2:03.27
2000	Olympic Games	Sydney, Australia	17th (h)	4 × 400 m relay	3:32.45
2001	World Indoor Championships	Lisbon, Portugal	18th (h)	800 m	2:08.91
2001	World Championships	Edmonton, Canada	7th	800 m	2:00.09
2002	European Indoor Championships	Vienna, Austria	4th	800 m	2:01.50
2002	European Championships	Munich, Germany	2nd	800 m	1:58.86
2002	European Championships	Munich, Germany	10th (h)	4 × 400 m relay	3:37.08
2003	World Indoor Championships	Birmingham, United Kingdom	3rd	800 m	1:59.53
2004	World Indoor Championships	Budapest, Hungary	4th (sf)	800 m	2:01.06
2004	Ibero-American Championships	Huelva, Spain	2nd	800 m	2:01.39
2004	Olympic Games	Athens, Greece	16th (sf)	800 m	2:03.30
2005	European Indoor Championships	Madrid, Spain	2nd	800 m	2:00.52
2005	Mediterranean Games	Almería, Spain	4th	400 m	53.73
2005	Mediterranean Games	Almería, Spain	1st	4 × 400 m relay	3:31.45
2005	World Championships	Helsinki, Finland	5th	800 m	1:59.99
2006	European Championships	Gothenburg, Sweden	7th	800 m	2:00.10
2007	European Indoor Championships	Birmingham, United Kingdom	5th	1500 m	4:09.18
2007	World Championships	Osaka, Japan	3rd	800 m	1:57.62
2008	World Indoor Championships	Valencia, Spain	4th	800 m	2:03.15
2009	World Championships	Berlin, Germany	7th	800 m	1:58.81
2010	European Championships	Barcelona, Spain	7th	800 m	1:59.97

Awards
Preceded by Laia Sanz	Spanish Sportswoman of the Year; 2007	Succeeded by Virginia Ruano; Anabel Medina
