= 2011 European Athletics Indoor Championships – Women's 4 × 400 metres relay =

The Women's 4 × 400 metres relay race at the 2011 European Athletics Indoor Championships was held at March 6, 2011 at 17:15 local time.

== Records ==
Standing records prior to the 2011 European Athletics Indoor Championships
World record	Russia (RUS)	3:23.37	Glasgow, United Kingdom	28 January 2006
European record	Russia (RUS)	3:23.37	Glasgow, United Kingdom	28 January 2006
Championship record	Belarus (BLR)	3:27.83	Birmingham, United Kingdom	4 March 2007
World Leading	Texas A&M University	3:30.70	New York City, United States	5 February 2011

== Results ==
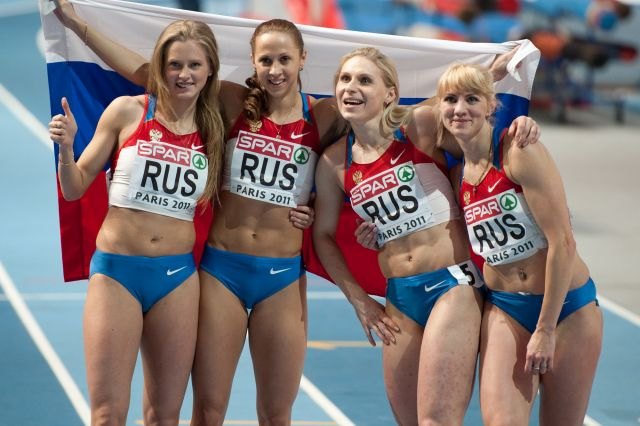
Russia after their victory.

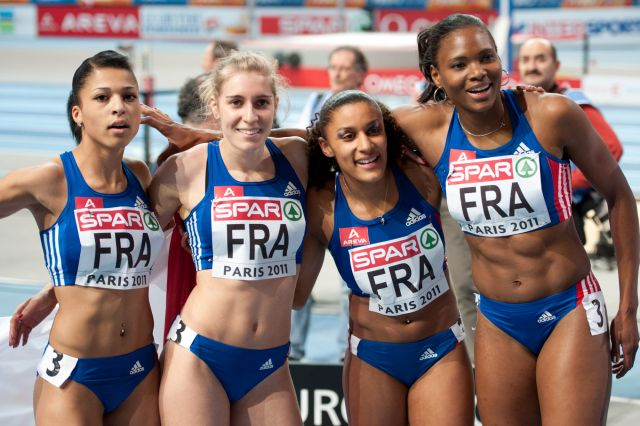
France after their third-place finish.

The race was held at 17:15.

Rank	Lane	Nationality	Athlete	React	Time	Notes
1st place, gold medalist(s)	5	Russia	Kseniya Zadorina; Kseniya Vdovina; Yelena Migunova; Olesya Forsheva	0.244	3:29.34	WL
2nd place, silver medalist(s)	4	Great Britain	Kelly Sotherton; Lee McConnell; Marilyn Okoro; Jenny Meadows	0.189	3:31.36	
3rd place, bronze medalist(s)	3	France	Muriel Hurtis-Houairi; Laetitia Denis; Marie Gayot; Floria Gueï	0.197	3:32.16	NR
4	2	Italy	Giulia Arcioni; Maria Enrica Spacca; Chiara Bazzoni; Marta Milani	0.170	3:33.70	NR
5	6	Germany	Claudia Hoffmann; Larissa Kettenis; Wiebke Ullmann; Janin Lindenberg	0.208	3:33.80	
6	1	Ukraine	Hanna Titimets; Nataliya Lupu; Darya Prystupa; Antonina Yefremova	0.253	3:34.08	
