= Kabirirsang =

Village in Kenya

Coordinates: 0°17′N 35°17′E

Kabirirsang is a village near Kapsabet in the Nandi Hills in Nandi County, Kenya. Administratively, Kabirirsang is a location in Kilibwoni division of Nandi County. Its local authority is Kapsabet municipality and local constituency is Emgwen.

Kabirirsang is the birthplace of several famous Kenyan runners, such as Henry Rono, Janeth Jepkosgei, Wilson Kipketer and Wilfred Bungei. It is also home to Kabirirsang High School. Kabirirsang Center the long-time market place of the locals, is located at top the hill near the main road. Kabirirsang was famously known for British white settlers who practiced farming.
