= Lucia Hrivnák Klocová =

Slovak middle distance athlete (born 1983)

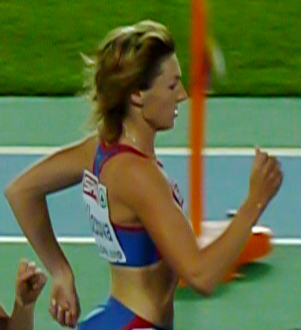
- Klocová at the 2010 European Championships

Personal information
- Nationality: Slovakia
- Born: 20 November 1983 (age 42) Martin, Czechoslovakia
- Height: 1.71 m (5 ft 7 in)
- Weight: 56 kg (123 lb)

Sport
- Country: (Slovakia) Slovak Republic
- Sport: Athletics
- Events: 800 metres, 1500 metres
- Club: AK ZŤS Martin
- Coached by: Pavel Slouka

Achievements and titles
- Olympic finals: 2012; 1500 m, 5th
- Highest world ranking: 800 m: 202 (All time); 800 m: 95 (All time U20); 1500 m: 243 (All time)
- Personal bests: 800 m: 1:58.51; 1500 m : 4:02.99
Medal record
Women's athletics
Representing Slovakia
European Championships
| Bronze medal – third place | 2010 Barcelona | 800 m |
European Athletics Team Championships
| Gold medal – first place | 2013 Banská Bystrica | Mixed team |
European Games
| Gold medal – first place | 2015 Baku | Mixed team |
European U23 Championships
| Silver medal – second place | 2001 Bydgoszcz | 800 m |
World Junior Championships
| Silver medal – second place | 2002 Kingston | 800 m |
| Bronze medal – third place | 2000 Santiago | 800 m |
European Junior Championships
| Gold medal – first place | 2001 Grosseto | 800 m |

Lucia Hrivnák Klocová (born 20 November 1983) is a Slovak retired middle distance athlete, who specialized in the 800 metres and 1500 metres. She represented Slovakia at the 2004, 2008 and 2012 Olympic Games. She has also reached the semi-finals of the World Championships in Athletics on five occasions.

== Biography ==
=== Junior career ===
She was a highly successful junior athlete, winning the bronze medal at the 2000 World Junior Championships and then going on to become the 2001 European Junior Champion. The following year she improved one place on the global stage, taking a silver medal at the 2002 World Junior Championships. Stepping up an age level, she won the silver at the 2003 European Athletics U23 Championships.

=== Senior career ===
She set a personal best in the 800 m at the 2008 Meeting Gaz de France in Paris. Her time of 1:58.51 was a step towards Gabriela Sedláková's Slovak record of 1:58.37, but it was overshadowed by Pamela Jelimo's African record run.

Klocová reached her first senior final at the 2010 European Athletics Championships where she finished fourth in the women's 800 m. She was later awarded the bronze medal, after the disqualification of Mariya Savinova. She broke Andrea Sollarova's seventeen-year-old national record over 1500 metres at the Athletics Bridge meet in Dubnica later that year. Her time of 4:08.86 was enough for second place behind Olympic finalist Anna Mishchenko, who set a meet record. At the 2012 Summer Olympics, she reached the 1500 m final, finishing in 8th place. However, during the following years five runners were disqualified for doping and as of September 2024 she is 4th.

=== Coach ===
She was coached by Pavel Slouka and her club is AK ZTS Martin, where she returned after 8 years spent in Slávia UK Bratislava.

== Competition record ==
| Year | Competition | Venue | Position | Event | Notes |
Representing Slovakia
| 2000 | World Junior Championships | Santiago, Chile | 3rd | 800 m | 2:04.00 |
| 2001 | European Junior Championships | Grosseto, Italy | 1st | 800 m | 2:03.76 |
| 2002 | World Junior Championships | Kingston, Jamaica | 2nd | 800 m | 2:01.73 |
| 2003 | European U23 Championships | Bydgoszcz, Poland | 2nd | 800 m | 2:05.02 |
| 2003 | World Championships | Paris, France | 10th (sf) | 800 m | 2:00.73 |
| 2004 | Olympic Games | Athens, Greece | 19th (sf) | 800 m | 2:00.79 |
| 2005 | European U23 Championships | Erfurt, Germany | 5th | 800 m | 2:06.40 |
| 2005 | World Championships | Helsinki, Finland | 12th (sf) | 800 m | 2:00.64 |
| 2006 | European Championships | Gothenburg, Sweden | 10th (sf) | 800 m | 2:00.63 |
| 2007 | World Championships | Osaka, Japan | 7th (sf) | 800 m | 1:58.62 |
| 2007 | World Athletics Final | Stuttgart, Germany | 4th | 800 m | 1:58.94 |
| 2008 | Olympic Games | Beijing, China | 11th (sf) | 800 m | 1:58.80 |
| 2008 | World Athletics Final | Stuttgart, Germany | 5th | 800 m | 2:00.05 |
| 2009 | World Championships | Berlin, Germany | 17th (sf) | 800 m | 2:01.56 |
| 2010 | European Championships | Barcelona, Spain | 3rd | 800 m | 1:59.48 |
| 2011 | World Championships | Daegu, South Korea | 20th (sf) | 800 m | 2:01.85 |
| 2012 | European Championships | Helsinki, Finland | 4th | 800 m | 2:01.38 |
| 2012 | Olympic Games | London, United Kingdom | 4th | 1500 m | 4:12.64 |
| 2014 | European Championships | Zurich, Switzerland | 16th (h) | 1500 m | 4:14.77 |
| 2015 | World Championships | Beijing, China | 13th (sf) | 800 m | 1:59.14 |
| 2016 | European Championships | Amsterdam, Netherlands | 10th | 1500 m | 4:35.61 |
| 2016 | Olympic Games | Rio de Janeiro, Brazil | 28th (h) | 800 m | 2:00.57 |
| 2021 | European Team Championships Second league | Stara Zagora, Bulgaria | 3rd | 1500 m | 4:25.82 |
