= 2000 World Junior Championships in Athletics – Women's 1500 metres =

Women's sport event

The women's 1500 metres event at the 2000 World Junior Championships in Athletics was held in Santiago, Chile, at Estadio Nacional Julio Martínez Prádanos on 19 and 21 October.

== Medalists ==
| Gold | Abebech Nigussie; Ethiopia |
| Silver | Rose Kosgei; Kenya |
| Bronze | Georgie Clarke; Australia |

== Results ==
=== Final ===
21 October

| Rank | Name | Nationality | Time | Notes |
|---|---|---|---|---|
| 1st place, gold medalist(s) | Abebech Nigussie | Ethiopia | 4:19.93 | |
| 2nd place, silver medalist(s) | Rose Kosgei | Kenya | 4:20.16 | |
| 3rd place, bronze medalist(s) | Georgie Clarke | Australia | 4:20.21 | |
| 4 | Zanelle Grobler | South Africa | 4:21.41 | |
| 5 | Rasa Drazdauskaitė | Lithuania | 4:21.58 | |
| 6 | Chen Fang | China | 4:22.81 | |
| 7 | Florence Kyalo | Kenya | 4:22.95 | |
| 8 | Melissa Rollison | Australia | 4:25.17 | |
| 9 | Irina Vashchuk | Ukraine | 4:25.28 | |
| 10 | Ljiljana Culibrk | Croatia | 4:25.81 | |
| 11 | Christina Carruzzo | Switzerland | 4:26.57 | |
| | Jéssica Augusto | Portugal | DNF | |

=== Heats ===
19 October

==== Heat 1 ====
| Rank | Name | Nationality | Time | Notes |
|---|---|---|---|---|
| 1 | Abebech Nigussie | Ethiopia | 4:19.66 | Q |
| 2 | Rose Kosgei | Kenya | 4:20.31 | Q |
| 3 | Zanelle Grobler | South Africa | 4:21.80 | Q |
| 4 | Rasa Drazdauskaitė | Lithuania | 4:22.02 | Q |
| 5 | Melissa Rollison | Australia | 4:22.46 | q |
| 6 | Ljiljana Culibrk | Croatia | 4:22.96 | q |
| 7 | Irina Vashchuk | Ukraine | 4:24.09 | q |
| 8 | Agnes Tschurtschenthaler | Italy | 4:28.43 | |
| 9 | Katharina Splinter | Germany | 4:29.91 | |
| 10 | Yâprak Kalemoglu | Turkey | 4:34.21 | |
| 11 | Evelyn Guerra | Panama | 4:53.85 | |
| 12 | Anarika February | Guyana | 5:07.43 | |
| 13 | Dinora Molina | Honduras | 5:22.26 | |
| | Esther Desviat | Spain | DNF | |

==== Heat 2 ====
| Rank | Name | Nationality | Time | Notes |
|---|---|---|---|---|
| 1 | Chen Fang | China | 4:18.10 | Q |
| 2 | Florence Kyalo | Kenya | 4:19.38 | Q |
| 3 | Georgie Clarke | Australia | 4:23.16 | Q |
| 4 | Jéssica Augusto | Portugal | 4:24.15 | Q |
| 5 | Christina Carruzzo | Switzerland | 4:24.28 | q |
| 6 | Emma Ward | United Kingdom | 4:24.47 | |
| 7 | Maerenet Gebray | Ethiopia | 4:27.99 | |
| 8 | Kate McIlroy | New Zealand | 4:28.51 | |
| 9 | Irene Alfonso | Spain | 4:28.70 | |
| 10 | Krisztina Papp | Hungary | 4:30.64 | |
| 11 | Julie Coulaud | France | 4:32.57 | |
| 12 | Dina Lebo Phalula | South Africa | 4:44.20 | |
| 13 | Ioana Parusheva | Bulgaria | 4:47.27 | |
| 14 | Getrude Banda | Malawi | 4:53.09 | |
| | Kerstin Werner | Germany | DNF | |

== Participation ==
According to an unofficial count, 29 athletes from 23 countries participated in the event.

- Australia (2)
- Bulgaria (1)
- China (1)
- Croatia (1)
- Ethiopia (2)
- France (1)
- Germany (2)
- Guyana (1)
- Honduras (1)
- Hungary (1)
- Italy (1)
- Kenya (2)
- Lithuania (1)
- Malawi (1)
- New Zealand (1)
- Panama (1)
- Portugal (1)
- South Africa (2)
- Spain (2)
- Switzerland (1)
- Turkey (1)
- Ukraine (1)
- United Kingdom (1)
