= Hongmei =

Hongmei may refer to the following places in China:

- Hongmei, Fujian (洪梅镇), a town in Nan'an, Fujian
- Hongmei, Guangdong (洪梅镇), a town in Dongguan, Guangdong
- Hongmei, Jilin (红梅镇), a town in Meihekou, Jilin
- Hongmei Subdistrict (红梅街道), a subdistrict in Tianning District, Changzhou, Jiangsu

== See also ==
- Hong Mei (disambiguation)
