= Tetiana Petlyuk =

Ukrainian middle-distance runner (born 1982)

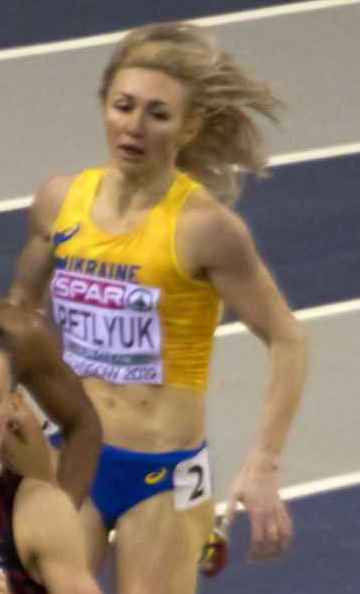

Medal record

Women's athletics

Representing Ukraine

European Athletics Indoor Championships
Silver medal – second place	2007 Birmingham	800 m

IAAF World Indoor Championships
Silver medal – second place	2008 Valencia	800 m

European Indoor Cup
Bronze medal – third place	2004 Leipzig	800 m

European Youth Olympic Festival
Gold medal – first place	1997 Lisbon	400 m

World Youth Championships
Silver medal – second place	1999 Bydgoszcz	800 m
Bronze medal – third place	1999 Bydgoszcz	4x400 m relay

Tetiana Hryhorivna Petlyuk or Tetiana Hryhorivna Petliuk (Ukrainian: Тетяна Григорівна Петлюк; born 22 February 1982) is a Ukrainian runner who specializes in the 800 metres. Her personal best time is 1:57.34 minutes, achieved in June 2006 in Kyiv. She has an indoor best of 1:58.67 minutes, set in 2007.

Petlyuk was a talented runner from a young age, winning a gold at the European Youth Olympic Festival, a silver at the 1999 World Youth Championships in Athletics, then a bronze at the 2001 European Athletics Junior Championships. She was Ukraine's best 800 m runner from 2004 to 2009, winning seven national titles over the period.

She represented Ukraine at the 2004 Athens Olympics and 2008 Beijing Olympics, reaching the semi-finals both times. She was also a semi-finalist at three World Championships in Athletics (2005, 2007, 2009). Her major medal wins came indoors: she was the runner-up at both the 2007 European Athletics Indoor Championships and the 2008 IAAF World Indoor Championships.

Abnormalities in her biological passport detected over the period from 18 August 2009 to February 2013 led to her receiving a two-year ban from the sport and the annulment of her results over that time (including two of her three appearances at the European Athletics Championships and her run at the 2011 World Championships in Athletics).

== Career ==
=== Early career ===
Born in Kyiv, she enjoyed swimming and table tennis in her youth before moving onto track and field after beating boys in races at school. Her parents agreed to send her to a sports college in the capital in 1994. In her first international competition she won the 400 metres at the European Youth Olympic Festival in 1997. Further medals followed at the 1999 World Youth Championships in Athletics, where she was second to Georgie Clarke in the 800 metres and helped Ukraine to the bronze medal in the sprint medley relay. She began to focus on middle-distance events thereafter.

In 2000, she ran a personal best of 2:04.74 minutes for the 800 m and placed sixth in the event at the 2000 World Junior Championships in Athletics. In 2001, she gained entrance into Kyiv's National University of Physical Training and Sports – the top sports university in the country. At the 2001 European Athletics Junior Championships she was the bronze medallist but later reflected that she did not approach the competition professionally, having gone on a long shopping trip just hours before the final. She reduced her best to 2:02.41 minutes in 2002 and competed twice internationally in 2003, running in the heats at the 2003 IAAF World Indoor Championships and coming seventh at the 2003 European Athletics U23 Championships.

=== First senior competitions ===
Her first senior medal came at the 2004 European Athletics Indoor Cup, where she ran a personal best of 2:01.14 minutes for the bronze. She won the Ukrainian indoor title but failed to make the final at the 2004 IAAF World Indoor Championships due to an injury involving her sacral nerves. After a seventh place at the 2004 European Cup she won her first national outdoor title, dipping under two minutes for the first time with her finish in 1:59.62 minutes. She produced a personal best of 1:59.48 minutes in the semi-finals of the 2004 Athens Olympics but this was not enough to enter the final as one of the fastest non-qualifiers.

She failed to reach such heights in 2005 as her coach began working for FC Khimki. With little money or time with her coach, her fastest that year was 2:01.78 minutes. However, she still won a second national indoor title and was a semi-finalist at the 2005 European Athletics Indoor Championships and the 2005 World Championships in Athletics. The following year her coach moved to FC Krasnodar and she again travelled with him. This time her training arrangements were more productive. In the indoor season she won the Sparkassen Cup meeting and was a semi-finalist at the 2006 IAAF World Indoor Championships. Her outdoor opener of 1:57.34 minutes was her fastest that year. She was one of the favourites at the 2006 European Cup, but fell in the race and was sent to hospital with superficial injuries. She ran well at the 2006 European Athletics Championships, but was conservative in her tactics due to her previous fall: choosing not to run in the tightest lane, she ended up narrowly missing out on a medal and later investigation showed she had covered 817 m during the race. Her season ended with a sixth-place finish at the 2006 IAAF World Athletics Final.

=== European and World Indoor medals ===
Petlyuk began 2007 in good form, winning the Sparkassen Cup meet with an indoor best of 1:58.67 minutes and setting a meet record at the PSD Bank Meeting. She won a third straight Ukrainian indoor title and secured the silver medal at the 2007 European Athletics Indoor Championships, finishing second to Oksana Zbrozhek. She was a semi-finalist at the 2007 World Championships in Athletics, but persistent thigh pain dogged her season. After the end of the track and field season doctors diagnosed her with an intervertebral hernia, stemming from her fall in 2006.

She returned successfully after rehabilitation at the start of 2008, defeating Maria Mutola at the 2008 IAAF World Indoor Championships and taking the silver medal in the 800 m final, behind Tamsyn Lewis. She was national champion both indoors and outdoors that year and represented Ukraine at the 2008 Summer Olympics. She was an 800 m semi-finalist and also ran in the heats with the Ukrainian 4×400 metres relay team. She did not compete in the remaining IAAF Golden League meets as she was called back to Kyiv to be presented with an apartment in recognition of her achievements. However, this never materialised and her season ended prematurely. She later remarked on the affair: "They said that my participation was obligatory, because the mayor of Kyiv had to give me keys for a new apartment in the Ukrainian capital. But finally I got just a commendation for my high results in athletics. I felt defrauded."

She placed sixth at the 2009 European Athletics Indoor Championships, but was again just a semi-finalist outdoors at the 2009 World Championships in Athletics. She again featured on the Ukrainian relay team, but did not make the final there either. She claimed national titles in the 800 m and the 1500 metres outdoors. At the World Championships she gave a blood sample during her doping test that would ultimately lead to the disqualification of all her results from 18 August 2009 to 15 February 2013. Performances at her national championships and results from the 2011 European Athletics Indoor Championships, 2011 World Championships in Athletics and the 2012 European Athletics Championships.

=== Doping ban ===
In early 2013 the Ukrainian Athletics Federation suspended Petlyuk for two years due to anomalies in her biological passport, banning her from competition from February 2013 until February 2015.

== Personal life ==
She earned a master's degree in sports psychology at Kyiv's National University of Sports and Physical Culture in 2008.

== Personal bests ==
Outdoor

- 800 metres – 1:57.34 (2006)
- 1000 metres – 2:41.69 (2007)
- 1500 metres – 4:06.51 (2009)

Indoor

- 800 metres – 1:58.67 (2007)
- 1000 metres – 2:34.76 (2007)
- 1500 metres – 4:10.91 (2008)

== Achievements ==
Year	Competition	Venue	Position	Event	Notes
Representing Ukraine
1999	World Youth Championships	Bydgoszcz, Poland	2nd	800m	2:06.97
2000	World Junior Championships	Santiago, Chile	6th	800m	2:07.26
2000	World Junior Championships	Santiago, Chile	6th	4 × 400 m relay	3:37.83
2001	European Junior Championships	Grosseto, Italy	3rd	800 metres	2:04.15
2003	European U23 Championships	Bydgoszcz, Poland	7th	800m	2:06.57
2003	European U23 Championships	Bydgoszcz, Poland	4th	4 × 400 m relay	3:33.63
2006	European Championships	Gothenburg, Sweden	4th	800m	1:58.65
2006	World Athletics Final	Stuttgart, Germany	6th	800m	2:00.67
2007	European Indoor Championships	Birmingham, United Kingdom	2nd	800m	1:59.84
2008	World Indoor Championships	Valencia, Spain	2nd	800 metres	2:02.66
2011	European Indoor Championships	Paris, France	DQ	800 metres	
2011	World Championships	Daegu, South Korea	DQ	800 metres	
2012	European Championships	Helsinki, Finland	DQ	800 metres	
