= Wilfred Bungei =

Kenyan middle-distance runner

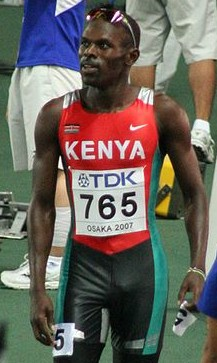
- Bungei at the 2007 Osaka World Championships.

Personal information
- Nationality: Kenya
- Born: Wilfred Kipkemboi Bungei; 24 July 1980 (age 45) Kabirirsang, Kenya

Sport
- Sport: Track and field
- Event: 800 metres
Medal record
Men's athletics
Representing Kenya
Olympic Games
Gold medal – first place	2008 Beijing	800 m
World Championships
Silver medal – second place	2001 Edmonton	800 m
World Indoor Championships
Gold medal – first place	2006 Moscow	800 metres
Bronze medal – third place	2003 Birmingham	800 metres

Wilfred Kipkemboi Bungei (born 24 July 1980) is a Kenyan retired Middle-distance runner, who won the 800 m gold medal at the 2008 Summer Olympics in Beijing. He also won at the World indoor Championships in Moscow 2006 the 800 metres title, defeating Mbulaeni Mulaudzi and Olympic Champion Yuriy Borzakovskiy in the race.

== Career ==
Bungei was ranked No.1 in the world over 800 m in 2002 and 2003. He has a personal best of 1:42.34 minutes (Rieti 2002). At the 2001 World Championships in Athletics in Edmonton he won a silver medal over 800 m, finishing behind André Bucher.

While in school, he focused on sprints and decathlon, before concentrating on 800 metres running. He graduated from Samoei High School in 1998. At the 1998 World Junior Championships in Athletics he won a silver medal. Bungei represented his native country at the 2004 Summer Olympics in Athens, Greece.

Bungei is from Kabirirsang, a village near Kapsabet. Several of his relatives are runners, including his brother Sammy Kurgat, who won the 2008 Cologne Marathon. He is a second cousin to Kenyan-born Danish former athlete Wilson Kipketer, while his mum is a cousin of Henry Rono.

Bungei is based near Verona, Italy during track season. He is married to Priscah Bungei with two sons (as of 2008).

He was part of the 4 × 800 metres relay team who currently holds the world record.
