= Ewelina Sętowska-Dryk =

Polish middle-distance runner

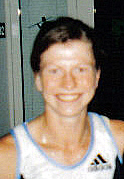
Sętowska-Dryk in 2007

Ewelina Sętowska-Dryk (born 5 March 1980 in Puławy) is a Polish middle-distance runner who specializes in the 800 metres.

She finished fifth at the 2005 Summer Universiade in İzmir and sixth at the 2006 IAAF World Indoor Championships in Moscow, the latter in an indoor personal best indoor time of 2:02.39 minutes. She won a bronze medal in 4 x 400 metres relay at the 2006 European Championships, together with teammates Monika Bejnar, Grażyna Prokopek and Anna Jesień.

Her personal best time over 800 m is 1:58.96 minutes, achieved in August 2006 in Rieti.

== Competition record ==
| Year | Competition | Venue | Position | Event | Notes |
Representing Poland
| 2003 | Universiade | Daegu, South Korea | 7th | 400 m hurdles | 57.92 |
| 2003 | Universiade | Daegu, South Korea | 2nd | 4 × 400 m relay | 3:38.17 |
| 2005 | European Indoor Championships | Madrid, Spain | 12th (sf) | 800 m | 2:11.43 |
| 2005 | World Championships | Helsinki, Finland | 18th (sf) | 800 m | 2:02.02 |
| 2005 | Universiade | İzmir, Turkey | 5th | 800 m | 2:02.30 |
| 2005 | Universiade | İzmir, Turkey | 2nd | 4 × 400 m relay | 3:27.71 |
| 2006 | World Indoor Championships | Moscow, Russia | 6th | 800 m | 2:02.39 |
| 2006 | European Championships | Gothenburg, Sweden | 9th (sf) | 800 m | 2:00.60 |
| 2006 | European Championships | Gothenburg, Sweden | 3rd | 4 × 400 m relay | 3:27.77 |
| 2007 | European Indoor Championships | Birmingham, United Kingdom | 14th (h) | 800 m | 2:04.66 |
| 2007 | World Championships | Osaka, Japan | 20th (sf) | 800 m | 2:01.02 |
| 2007 | World Championships | Osaka, Japan | 6th | 4 × 400 m relay | 3:26.49 |
| 2008 | World Indoor Championships | Valencia, Spain | 9th (sf) | 800 m | 2:02.38 |
| 2008 | World Indoor Championships | Valencia, Spain | 6th | 4 × 400 m relay | 3:36.97 |
| 2012 | European Championships | Helsinki, Finland | 13th (h) | 800 m | 2:04.30 |
