= 2001 IAAF World Indoor Championships – Women's 800 metres =

The women's 800 metres event at the 2001 IAAF World Indoor Championships was held on 9–11 March 2001.

The winning margin was 0.04 seconds which as of July 2024 remains the narrowest winning margin for the women's 800 metres at these championships.

== Medalists ==
Gold	Silver	Bronze
Maria Mutola; Mozambique	Stephanie Graf; Austria	Helena Dziurova-Fuchsová; Czech Republic

== Results ==
=== Heats ===
First 2 of each heat (Q) and the next 4 fastest (q) qualified for the semifinals.

Rank	Heat	Name	Nationality	Time	Notes
1	4	Jolanda Čeplak	Slovenia	2:02.97	Q
2	4	Yelena Afanasyeva	Russia	2:03.28	Q
3	4	Laetitia Valdonado	France	2:04.00	q
4	2	Maria Mutola	Mozambique	2:04.16	Q
5	4	Sandra Teixeira	Portugal	2:04.18	q
6	2	Lwiza John	Tanzania	2:04.29	Q
7	1	Ivonne Teichmann	Germany	2:04.47	Q
8	2	Tamsyn Lewis	Australia	2:04.56	q
9	1	Stephanie Graf	Austria	2:04.58	Q
9	3	Helena Dziurova-Fuchsová	Czech Republic	2:04.58	Q
11	3	Svetlana Cherkasova	Russia	2:04.70	Q
12	3	Charmaine Howell	Jamaica	2:05.14	q
13	2	Joanne Fenn	Great Britain	2:05.16	
14	1	Fabiane dos Santos	Brazil	2:05.18	
15	4	Adoración García	Spain	2:05.25	
16	1	Jennifer Toomey	United States	2:05.55	
17	3	Anca Safta	Romania	2:06.13	
18	1	Mayte Martínez	Spain	2:08.91	
19	4	Wang Yuanping	China	2:09.80	
20	3	Lin Na	China	2:10.99	
	2	Jearl Miles Clark	United States	DNS	

=== Semifinals ===
First 3 of each semifinal (Q) qualified directly for the final.

Rank	Heat	Name	Nationality	Time	Notes
1	1	Stephanie Graf	Austria	2:01.34	Q
2	1	Yelena Afanasyeva	Russia	2:01.97	Q
3	1	Lwiza John	Tanzania	2:02.40	Q
4	1	Ivonne Teichmann	Germany	2:03.20	
5	2	Maria Mutola	Mozambique	2:03.64	Q
6	2	Jolanda Čeplak	Slovenia	2:03.68	Q
7	2	Helena Dziurova-Fuchsová	Czech Republic	2:04.29	Q
8	1	Sandra Teixeira	Portugal	2:04.38	
9	2	Tamsyn Lewis	Australia	2:04.79	
10	1	Laetitia Valdonado	France	2:05.89	
11	2	Svetlana Cherkasova	Russia	2:06.19	
12	2	Charmaine Howell	Jamaica	2:09.13	

=== Final ===
Rank	Name	Nationality	Time	Notes
1st place, gold medalist(s)	Maria Mutola	Mozambique	1:59.74	
2nd place, silver medalist(s)	Stephanie Graf	Austria	1:59.78	
3rd place, bronze medalist(s)	Helena Dziurova-Fuchsová	Czech Republic	2:01.18	
4	Lwiza John	Tanzania	2:01.76	
5	Yelena Afanasyeva	Russia	2:02.17	
6	Jolanda Čeplak	Slovenia	2:02.67	
