= Laetitia Valdonado =

French middle-distance runner

Personal information
- Nationality: French
- Born: 4 August 1977 (age 49) Pau, France
- Years active: 1999-2005
- Height: 1.59 m (5 ft 3 in)
- Weight: 48 kg (106 lb)

Sport
- Event: middle distance running
- Club: Uagm
- Coached by: Bernard Mossant
Medal record
Representing France
Mediterranean Games
Gold medal – first place	2005 Almeria	800m
Silver medal – second place	2005 Almeria	4x400m relay
European U23 Championships
Bronze medal – third place	1999 Gothenburg	800m

Laetitia Valdonado (born 4 August 1977) is a retired French athlete who specialised in the 800 metres. She won the gold medal at the 2005 Mediterranean Games.

== Competition record ==
Year	Competition	Venue	Position	Event	Notes
Representing the France
1996	World Junior Championships	Sydney, Australia	12th (sf)	800 m	2:09.34
1999	Universiade	Palma de Mallorca, Spain	5th	800 m	2:01.97
1999	European U23 Championships	Gothenburg, Sweden	3rd	800 m	2:04.20
2000	European Indoor Championships	Ghent, Belgium	15th (h)	800 m	2:05.47
2001	World Indoor Championships	Lisbon, Portugal	10th (sf)	800 m	2:05.89
2005	European Indoor Championships	Madrid, Spain	6th (sf)	800 m	2:09.73
2005	Mediterranean Games	Almería, Spain	1st	800 m	2:01.71
2005	Mediterranean Games	Almería, Spain	2nd	4x400 m relay	3:31.86
2005	World Championships	Helsinki, Finland	17th (sf)	800 m	2:01.90

== Personal bests ==
Outdoor

- 800 metres – 1:59.35 (Heusden-Zolder 2004)
- 1500 metres – 4:26.04 (Montgeron 2002)

Indoor

- 800 metres – 2:02.58 (Ghent 2005)
- 1000 metres – 2:41.36 (Liévin 2005)
- 1500 metres – 4:25.45 (Liévin 2002)

=== National Championships ===
- French Outdoor Athletic Championships :
  - winner of 800 m 2000
- French Indoor Athletic Championships :
  - winner of 800 m in 2001, 2004, 2005 and 2006
