= Athletics Bridge =

Annual track and field meeting in Slovakia

- Date: Late August – early September
- Location: Dubnica nad Váhom, Slovakia
- Event type: Track and field
- Established: 2003
- Website: Atletický Most

The Athletics Bridge (Slovak: Atletický Most) is an annual track and field meeting which takes place at the Mestský štadión in Dubnica nad Váhom, Slovakia. As one of the European Athletics Outdoor Classic Meetings, it is typically among of the last competitions held in the European summer track and field circuit.

The meeting was first held in 2003 and started life in Banská Bystrica, another Slovak city. Taking inspiration from the IAAF Golden League, the organising committee (headed by Milan Hort) set about creating their own national version. Consisting of a two-day "double meet", it mirrored the jackpot format with 250,000 Slovak Crowns being divided up between athletes who won an event on both days. The first edition mainly attracted Slovak, Hungarian and Ukrainian athletes, but the second gained European Athletics status and expanded to include other Europeans and African athletes. The following two years saw top level athletes compete, with eight World Championships medallists taking part in 2005, and ten medallists from the 2006 European Athletics Championships being in attendance the next year.

The Athletics Bridge meet was beset with financial difficulties in 2007 and as a result the Dubnica nad Váhom-based Atletický Klub Spartak Dubnica decided to take on the organisation of the meeting from then onwards. Changing to the more traditional one-day meeting format, it became allied with the Euro Meetings group and Hort remained as the meet director, with Alfons Juck serving as the competition manager. A wide variety of top-level athletes were present that year (including Roman Sebrle, Dayron Robles, Yargelis Savigne, Koji Murofushi and Ezekiel Kemboi) and the event attracted around 3700 people (the highest ever for an athletics event in Dubnica). In 2008, fourteen medalists from the 2008 Beijing Olympics entered the competition. Olympic gold medallist in the 110 metres hurdles, Dayron Robles, provided the meet highlight with a run of 12.95 seconds despite a strong headwind. Around 6000 people saw the meet in 2009 and the 2010 edition was host to a Slovak record through Lucia Klocová's run of 4:08.86 minutes in the 1500 metres. Cementing its position as Slovakia's foremost one-day athletics meet, some 17 world championship medallists were present in 2011.

== Meet records ==
=== Men ===
Men's meeting records of the Athletics Bridge
Event	Record	Athlete	Nationality	Date	Ref.
100 m	10.01 (±0.0 m/s)	Nesta Carter	Jamaica	26 August 2012	
200 m	20.59	Steve Mullings	Jamaica	6 September 2009	
400 m	45.75	LaShawn Merritt	United States	15 September 2011	
600 m	1:17.10	Tamás Kazi	Hungary	21 August 2013	
800 m	1:45.82	Edwin Melly	Kenya	26 August 2012	
1000 m	2:17.08	Abraham Rotich	Kenya	26 August 2012	
5000 m	14:52.60	Miroslav Vanko	Slovakia	16 September 2007	
110 m hurdles	12.95	Dayron Robles	Cuba	2008	
3000 m steeplechase	8:12.27	Bernard Mbugua	Kenya	15 September 2011	
High jump	2.33 m	Derek Drouin	Canada	21 August 2013	
Pole vault	5.68 m	Jan Kudlička	Czech Republic	21 August 2013	
Shot put	21.61 m	Christian Cantwell	United States	2006	
Hammer throw	82.53 m	Ivan Tsikhan	Belarus	2005	
Javelin throw	81.20 m	Ainārs Kovals	Latvia	2005	
3000 m walk	11:00.68	Antón Kučmín	Slovakia	21 August 2013	

=== Women ===
Women's meeting records of the Athletics Bridge
Event	Record	Athlete	Nationality	Date	Ref.
100 m	11.17 (−0.7 m/s)	Schillonie Calvert	Jamaica	15 September 2011	
200 m	22.91	LaVerne Jones-Ferrette	United States Virgin Islands	6 September 2009	
400 m	50.77	Olesya Krasnomovets	Russia	2005	
800 m	2:00.88	Yuliya Rusanova	Russia	15 September 2011	
1000 m	2:38.48	Brenda Martinez	United States	26 August 2012	
1500 m	4:26.51	Élodie Olivares	France	16 September 2007	
100 m hurdles	12.95 (+1.4 m/s)	Queen Harrison	United States	21 August 2013	
400 m hurdles	59.38	Miriam Hrdlicková	Slovakia	16 September 2007	
2000 m steeplechase	6:16.95	Milcah Chemos	Kenya	21 August 2013	
3000 m steeplechase	9:30.82	Lydia Chepkurui	Kenya	26 August 2012	
High jump	1.97 m	Svetlana Shkolina	Russia	26 August 2012	
Pole vault	4.50 m	Jiřina Ptáčníková	Czechoslovakia	15 September 2011	
Long jump	6.64 m	Jana Velďáková	Slovakia	16 September 2007	
Triple jump	14.65 m	Yargelis Savigne	Cuba	16 September 2007	
Shot put	20.83 m	Valerie Adams	New Zealand	15 September 2011	
Hammer throw	78.22 m	Anita Włodarczyk	Poland	21 August 2013	
