= 1999 World Youth Championships in Athletics =

- Dates: 16–18 July
- Host city: Bydgoszcz, Poland
- Venue: Zdzisław Krzyszkowiak Municipal Stadium
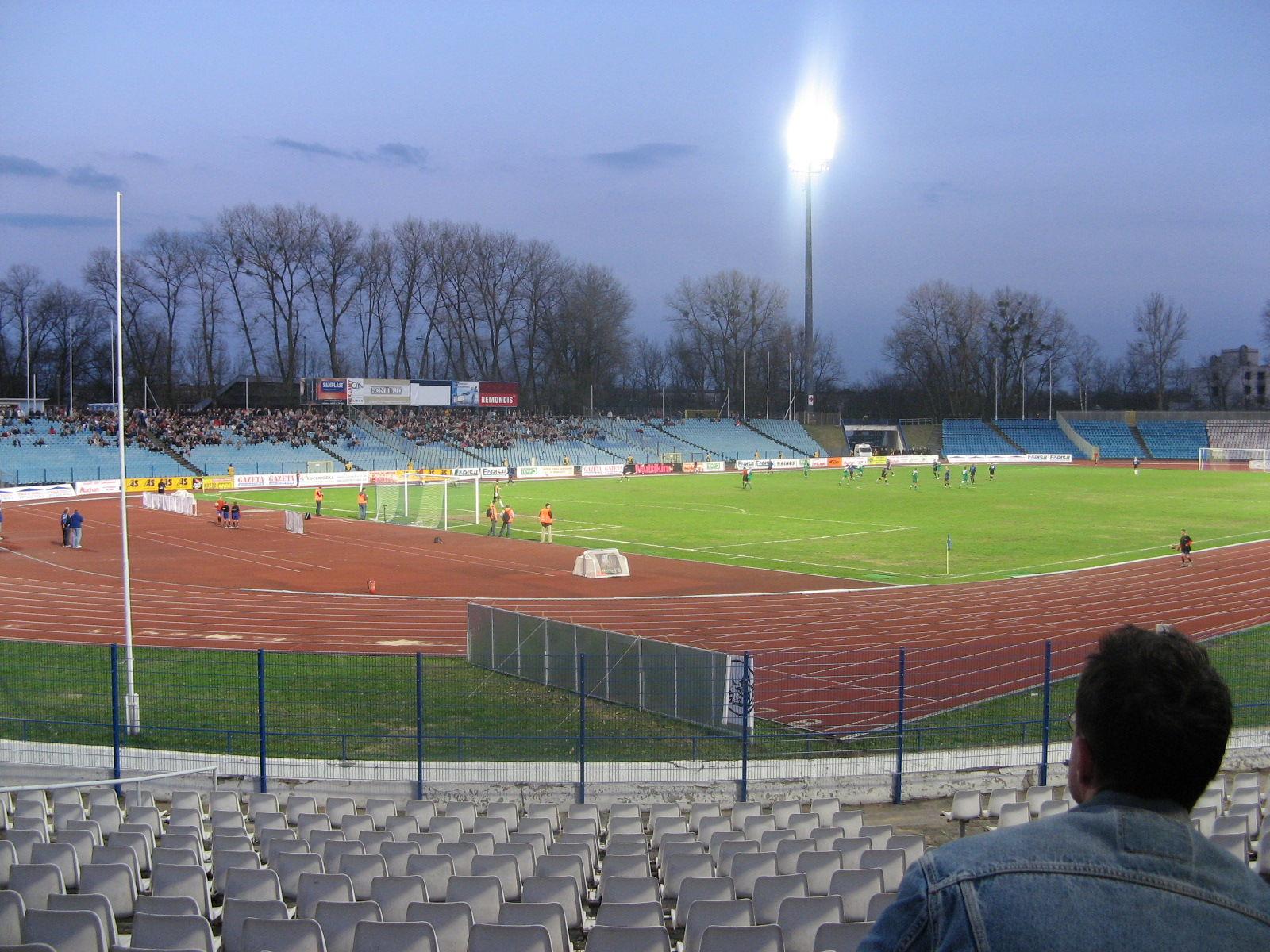
- Level: Youth (under 18)
- Events: 39

The 1999 World Youth Championships in Athletics was the first edition of the IAAF World Youth Championships in Athletics. It was held in Bydgoszcz, Poland from July 16 to July 18, 1999.

== Results ==
=== Boys ===
Event	Gold		Silver		Bronze	
100 m	Mark Lewis-Francis; Great Britain	10.40	Bryan Sears; United States	10.42	Omar Brown; Jamaica	10.43
200 m	Timothy Benjamin; Great Britain	20.72	Omar Brown; Jamaica	21.09	Bryan Sears; United States	21.16
400 m	William Mandla Nkosi; South Africa	46.94	Glaudel Garzón; Cuba	47.00	Mark van Soest; South Africa	47.19
800 m	Nicholas Wachira; Kenya	1:50.70	Berhanu Alemu; Ethiopia	1:50.79	Mohammad M. Al Azemi; Kuwait	1:51.24
1500 m	Cornelius Chirchir; Kenya	3:44.02	Michael Too; Kenya	3:44.70	Osman Yusif; Saudi Arabia	3:45.53
3000 m	Pius Muli; Kenya	8:08.16	Kenenisa Bekele; Ethiopia	8:09.89	Anouar Assila; Morocco	8:13.54
2000 m St.	Stephen Cherono; Kenya	5:31.89	Luleseged Wale; Ethiopia	5:32.61	Philip Simbolei; Kenya	5:41.77
110 m H 91.4 cm	Ladji Doucouré; France	13.26	Nassim Brahimi; Qatar	13.36	Paul Whitty; Canada	13.59
400 m H 84.0 cm	Marthinus Kritzinger; South Africa	49.86	Sergio Hierrezuelo; Cuba	49.95	Vincent Mumo Kiilu; Kenya	51.50
10,000 m track walk	Yevgeniy Demkov; Russia	42:26.07	Aleksandr Strokov; Russia	42:36.52	Takayuki Tanii; Japan	42:40.86
4 × 100 metres relay	Jamaica; Winston Smith; Michael Frater; Davaon Spence; Omar Brown	40.03	Japan; Yosuke Tahara; Kazuya Kitamura; Yoshitaka Kaneko; Yusuke Omae	40.14	Germany; Johannes Fischer; Christoph Lehner; Norman Grittke; Andre Streese	41.13
Medley relay	United States; Jonathan Lott; Bryan Sears; Travon Walton; Ivory McCann	1:51.29	South Africa; William Mandla Nkosi; Warren October; Marthinus Kritzinger; Mark van Soest	1:52.49	Japan; Toshio Imura; Takeshi Yoneda; Masakatsu Tanaka; Tsutomu Takahashi	1:54.10
High jump	Jacques Freitag; South Africa	2.16	Cui Kai; China	2.13	Andrei Chubsa; Belarus	2.13
Pole vault	Sébastien Homo; France	5.20	Oleksandr Korchmyd; Ukraine	5.10	Rico Tepper; Germany	5.00
Long jump	Shang Yapeng; China	7.80	Yoelmis Pacheco; Cuba	7.62	Nicolaas Grimbeeck; South Africa	7.59
Triple jump	Ibrahim Mahmedin; Qatar	15.96	Yoandri Betanzos; Cuba	15.83	Viktor Yastrebov; Ukraine	15.74
Shot put 5 kg	Robert Häggblom; Finland	19.76	Dmitriy Gorshkov; Russia	19.69	Khalid Habash Al-Suwaidi; Qatar	19.44
Discus 1.500 kg	Ming-Huang Chang; Chinese Taipei	64.14	Zhang Huabing; China	58.36	Raine Munukka; Finland	56.52
Hammer 5 kg	Krisztián Pars; Hungary	74.76	Oleksandr Lutsenko; Ukraine	73.68	Aleksei Yeliseyev; Russia	73.68
Javelin 700g	Joachim Kiteau; France	79.65	Saku Kuusisto; Finland	78.73	Alexandr Ivanov; Russia	78.65
WR world record | AR area record | CR championship record | GR games record | NR national record | OR Olympic record | PB personal best | SB season best | WL world leading (in a given season)

=== Girls ===
Event	Gold		Silver		Bronze	
100 m	Veronica Campbell; Jamaica	11.49	Lisa Sharpe; Jamaica	11.52	Adriana Lamalle; France	11.66
200 m	LaShauntea Moore; United States	23.38	Melaine Walker; Jamaica	23.72	Ana López; Cuba	23.97
400 m	Monique Henderson; United States	52.28	Helen Okpanachi; Nigeria	52.38	Norma González; Colombia	52.39
800 m	Georgina Clarke; Australia	2:05.90	Tetyana Petlyuk; Ukraine	2:06.97	Mihaela Olaru; Romania	2:08.20
1500 m	Zanelle Grobler; South Africa	4:23.06	Chibiwott Kibet; Kenya	4:24.43	Elaine Du Plessis; South Africa	4:24.59
3000 m	Alice Timbilil; Kenya	9:01.99	Meseret Defar; Ethiopia	9:02.08	Vivian Cheruiyot; Kenya	9:04.42
100 m H 76.2 cm	Adrianna Lamalle; France	13.08	Maren Freisen; Germany	13.42	Anay Tejeda; Cuba	13.45
400 m H	Jana Pittman; Australia	57.87	Ya Wu Jie; China	58.32	Patricia Hall; Jamaica	58.67
5000 m track walk	Tatiana Kozlova; Russia	22:31.93	Maryna Tsikhanava; Belarus	22:37.54	Ekaterina Dergounova; Russia	22:54.59
4 × 100 metres relay	Jamaica; Nadine Palmer; Melaine Walker; Veronica Campbell; Lisa Sharpe	44.30	United States; Ginnie Powell; Ashley Mitchell; Raasin McIntosh; Stephanie Durst	45.40	Poland; Dorota Wojtczak; Dorota Dydo; Małgorzata Flejszar; Anita Hennig	45.49
Medley Relay	United States; Stephanie Durst; LaShauntea Moore; Christy Fairley; Monique Henderson	2:07.71	Poland; Małgorzata Flejszar; Dorota Wojtczak; Hanna Wardowska; Magdalena Uzarska	2:09.19	Ukraine; Ganna Bordyugova; Viktoriya Lofitska; Maryna Maydanova; Tetyana Petlyuk	2:11.13
High jump	Anna Chicherova; Russia	1.89	Renáta Medgyesová; Slovakia	1.83	Gaelle Niare; France	1.79
Pole vault	Yelena Isinbayeva; Russia	4.10	Floé Kühnert; Germany	4.05	Vanessa Boslak; France	4.00
Long jump	Zhou Yangxia; China	6.29	Jenniina Halkoaho; Finland	6.24	Alina Militaru; Romania	6.22
Triple jump	Mabel Gay; Cuba	13.82	Anastasiya Ilyina; Russia	13.59	Yusmay Bicet; Cuba	13.58
Shot put	Hong Mei; China	15.57	Natallia Kharaneka; Belarus	15.57	Chiara Rosa; Italy	14.64
Discus	Hong Mei; China	52.18	Julia Bremser; Germany	51.83	Deborah Lovely; Australia	49.14
Hammer	Kamila Skolimowska; Poland	63.94	Yunaika Crawford; Cuba	57.56	Ivana Brkljacic; Croatia	55.69
Javelin	Olivia Norris; Germany	52.03	Xénia Frajka; Hungary	49.76	Halina Kakhava; Belarus	49.62
WR world record | AR area record | CR championship record | GR games record | NR national record | OR Olympic record | PB personal best | SB season best | WL world leading (in a given season)

== Medal table ==
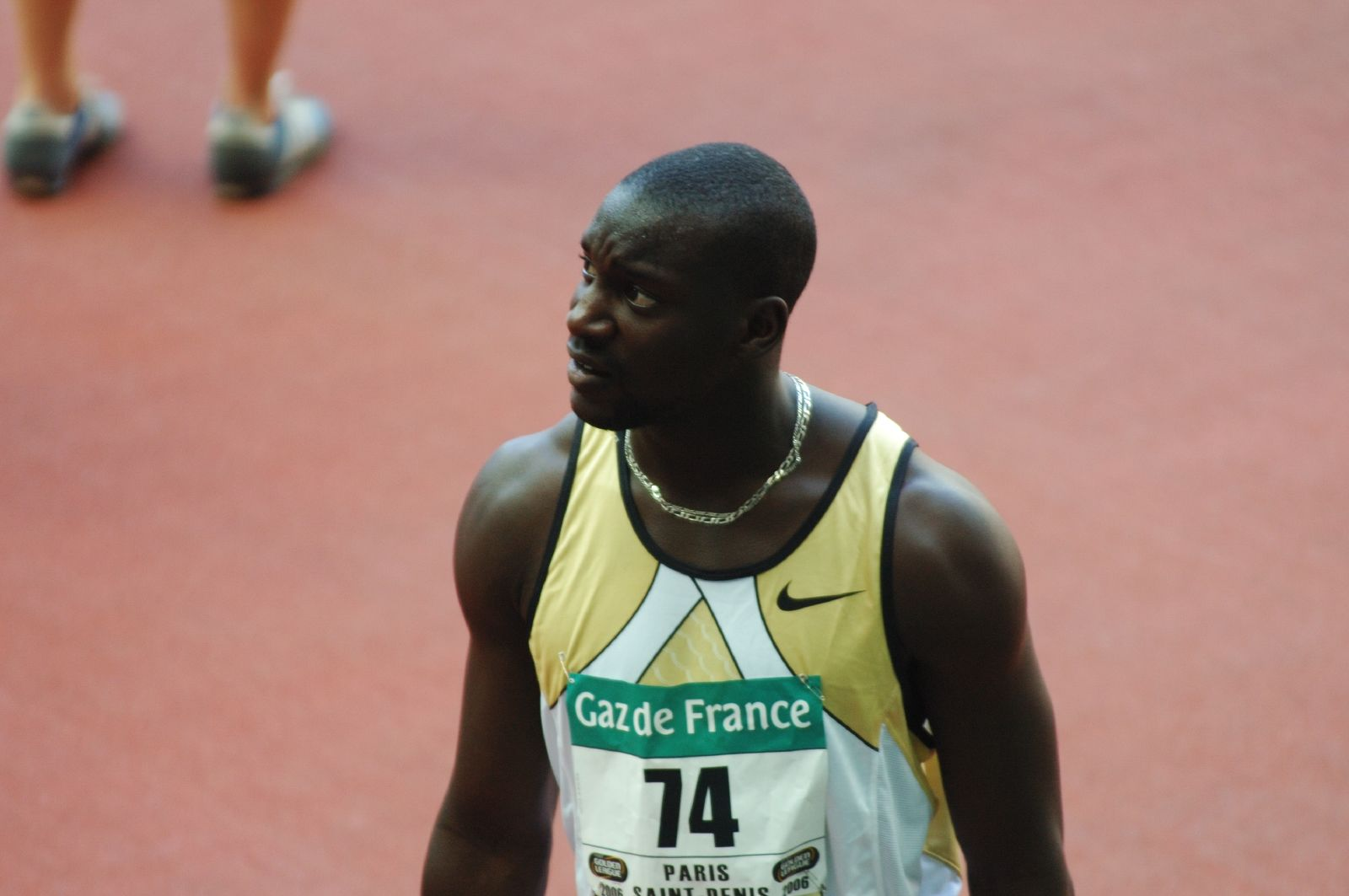
Ladji Doucouré of France was triumphant in the 110 metres hurdles.

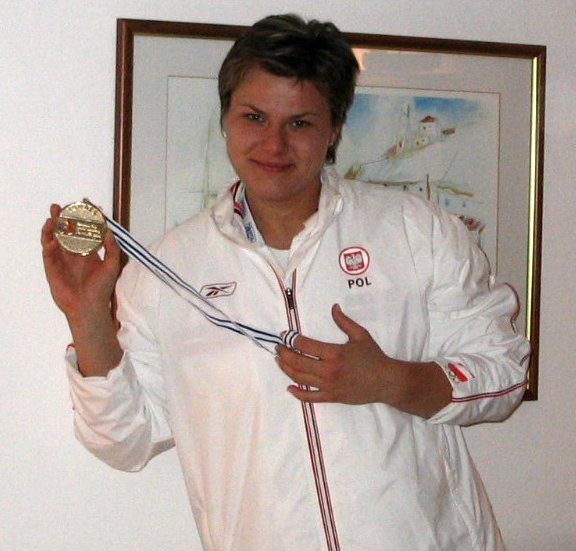
Kamila Skolimowska won the hammer throw gold for the host nation.

* Host nation (Poland)

Rank	Nation	Gold	Silver	Bronze	Total
1	Kenya	5	2	3	10
2	Russia	4	3	3	10
3	China	4	3	0	7
4	United States	4	2	1	7
5	South Africa	4	1	3	8
6	France	4	0	3	7
7	Jamaica	3	3	2	8
8	Australia	2	0	1	3
9	Great Britain	2	0	0	2
10	Cuba	1	5	3	9
11	Germany	1	3	2	6
12	Finland	1	2	1	4
13	Poland*	1	1	1	3
13	Qatar	1	1	1	3
15	Hungary	1	1	0	2
16	Chinese Taipei	1	0	0	1
17	Ethiopia	0	4	0	4
18	Ukraine	0	3	2	5
19	Belarus	0	2	2	4
20	Japan	0	1	2	3
21	Nigeria	0	1	0	1
21	Slovakia	0	1	0	1
23	Romania	0	0	2	2
24	Canada	0	0	1	1
24	Colombia	0	0	1	1
24	Croatia	0	0	1	1
24	Italy	0	0	1	1
24	Kuwait	0	0	1	1
24	Morocco	0	0	1	1
24	Saudi Arabia	0	0	1	1
Totals (30 entries)		39	39	39	117
