= Trevor Painter (coach) =

English athletics coach

- Education: University of Central Lancashire
- Occupation: Sports coach
- Organization: M11 Track Club
- Spouse: Jenny Meadows
- Children: 1
- Awards: Coaching Achievement Award (World Athletics Awards 2024); 2024 High Performance Coach of the Year (UK Coaching Awards); 2024 Coach of the Year (BBC Sports Personality of the Year)

Trevor Painter is an English athletics coach and the founder of M11 Track Club. He won the Coaching Achievement Award at the World Athletics Awards 2024. Alongside his wife Jenny Meadows, he won Coach of the Year at the 2024 BBC Sports Personality of the Year.

== Career ==
A former rugby league player and 400 metres runner, he spent two years in the academy at Wigan Warriors and he trained in Wigan where he first met athlete Jenny Meadows, who asked him to coach her. He started coaching around the year 2000 and became the founder and director of the M11 Track Club. Continuing to be based in Wigan, he coached athletes including Kirsten McAslan, Graeme Ballard, and was the athletics coach of Jenny Meadows when she won World Athletics Championships 800m and 4x400m relay bronze medals in 2009, and World Athletics Indoor Championships 800m silver in 2010.

He is the athletics coach of 2024 Olympic Games gold medalist Keely Hodgkinson along with his now wife Jenny Meadows. He also coached Georgia Hunter Bell to an individual Olympic medal in 2024 and is coach of Lewis Davey, who won bronze as part of the men's 4x400m relay team in Paris having previously won after claiming world silver and bronze relay medals in Budapest at the 2023 World Athletics Championships. The M11 Track Club also includes Scottish runners Erin Wallace and Eloise Walker, and Irish international runner Sarah Healy.

By November 2024, he had coached track athletes to four Olympic and eight World Championship medals, as well as 12 medals at European and Commonwealth level. After Hunter Bell and Hodgkinson had won medals at the 2025 World Championships in February 2026, Painter coached Hodgkinson to break the indoor world record over 800 metres. The following month, both Hodgkinson and Hunter Bell won gold medals, over 800 and 1500 metres respectively, at the 2026 World Indoor Championships. Having won further gold medals at the Commonwealth Games and European Championships that summer, Hunter Bell praised the M11 Track Club saying ""Our M11 group is such a vibe isn't it. Trevor and Jenny are…my amazing second parents, they're the best. We've got such a great unit, everyone is very fun and loving but also very professional. We've all got big goals, we aren't here just to make teams, we are here to win medals and win golds”.

== Accolades ==
In November 2024, he won Coaching Achievement Award, becoming the first winner to be announced as part of the World Athletics Awards 2024. At the UK Coaching Awards in December 2024 he won the High Performance Coach of the Year. Meadows and Painter jointly won the 2024 BBC Sports Personality of the Year Coach Award.

== Personal life ==
He graduated with an MSc in Elite Coaching Practice at the University of Central Lancashire. He married Jenny Meadows in 2006. They have a daughter, Arabella. He worked as part of the Premier League Covid-19 testing team during the Coronavirus pandemic.
