= Bryan Sears =

American sprinter

Personal information
- Nationality: United States
- Born: March 28, 1982 (age 44) Fort Riley, Kansas
- Height: 6 ft 1 in (1.85 m)
- Weight: 170 lb (77 kg)

Sport
- Sport: Running
- Event: Sprints
- College team: Florida Gators

Achievements and titles
- Personal bests: 100m: 10.42 (Bydgoszcz 1999); 200m: 21.16 (Bydgoszcz 1999)
Medal record
Men's athletics
Representing the United States
World Youth Championships
| Gold medal – first place | 1999 Bydgoszcz | Medley relay |
| Silver medal – second place | 1999 Bydgoszcz | 100 m |
| Bronze medal – third place | 1999 Bydgoszcz | 200 m |

Bryan Christopher Sears (born March 28, 1982) is an American sprinter who specializes in the 100 meters and 200 metres. He participated in the 1999 World Youth Championships in Athletics, winning silver and bronze, respectively, over these distances.

A native of Hinesville, Georgia, Sears attended Liberty County High School. He beat Jamel Ashley twice during his sophomore year in 1998, the only high school sprinter to do so.

Sears later attended the University of Florida.
