= Olivia Norris =

German javelin thrower

Personal information
- Born: 17 September 1983 (age 42)

Sport
- Country: Germany
- Sport: Athletics
- Event: Javelin throw

Achievements and titles
- Personal best(s): Javelin throw: 54.29 m (1999 Duisburg, German Championships)

Olivia Norris (born 17 September 1983) is a German female javelin thrower, who won an individual gold medal (52.03 m) at the 1st Youth World Championships - Bydgoszcz (Poland) .
