= Georgie Clarke =

Australian middle-distance runner

Georgina Clarke (born 17 June 1984 in Geelong) is an Australian athlete who specialised in the middle-distance events. She won multiple international medals at youth and junior levels. She competed at the 2000 Summer Olympics in Sydney at the age of 16. She competed for Geelong College.

== Competition record ==
Year	Competition	Venue	Position	Event	Notes
Representing Australia
1998	World Junior Championships	Annecy, France	10th	1500 m	4:20.44
1999	World Youth Championships	Bydgoszcz, Poland	1st	800 m	2:05.90
2000	Olympic Games	Sydney, Australia	20th (sf)	1500 m	4:10.99
2000	World Junior Championships	Santiago, Chile	2nd	800 m	2:02.28
2000	World Junior Championships	Santiago, Chile	3rd	1500 m	4:20.21
2001	World Indoor Championships	Lisbon, Portugal	10th (h)	1500 m	4:13.21
2001	World Youth Championships	Debrecen, Hungary	1st	1500 m	4:14.08
2001	World Championships	Edmonton, Canada	26th (h)	1500 m	4:15.31
2001	Goodwill Games	Brisbane, Australia	8th	Mile	4:43.84
2002	World Junior Championships	Kingston, Jamaica	19th (h)	1500 m	4:32.93
