= Jemma Simpson =

British athlete (born 1984)

Jemma Simpson OLY
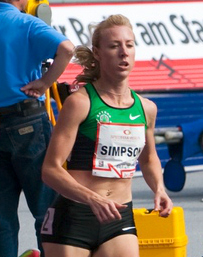

Personal information
- Born: Plymouth
- Height: 1.70 m (5 ft 7 in)

Sport
- Country: Great Britain
- Club: Newquay & Par
- Turned pro: 2005

Achievements and titles
- Olympic finals: 2008
- World finals: 2007
- Personal best(s): 800 m 1:58.74 (07/2010); 1500 m 4:06.39 (05/2010)

Jemma Louise Simpson OLY (born 10 February in Plymouth) is a British athlete who competes in the 800 metres and 1500 metres. She is a former British champion over 800m, winning both 2007, 2009 and 2010 British Championships. She was formerly coached by Olympic medallist Mark Rowland.

== Early life ==
Simpson attended Mount Charles Junior school, and Penrice School, before receiving a scholarship to Millfield at the age of 13, and graduated from St. Mary's College, Twickenham where she studied English and Media.

Simpson has starred as an extra in Neighbours, and The Da Vinci Code.

== Career ==
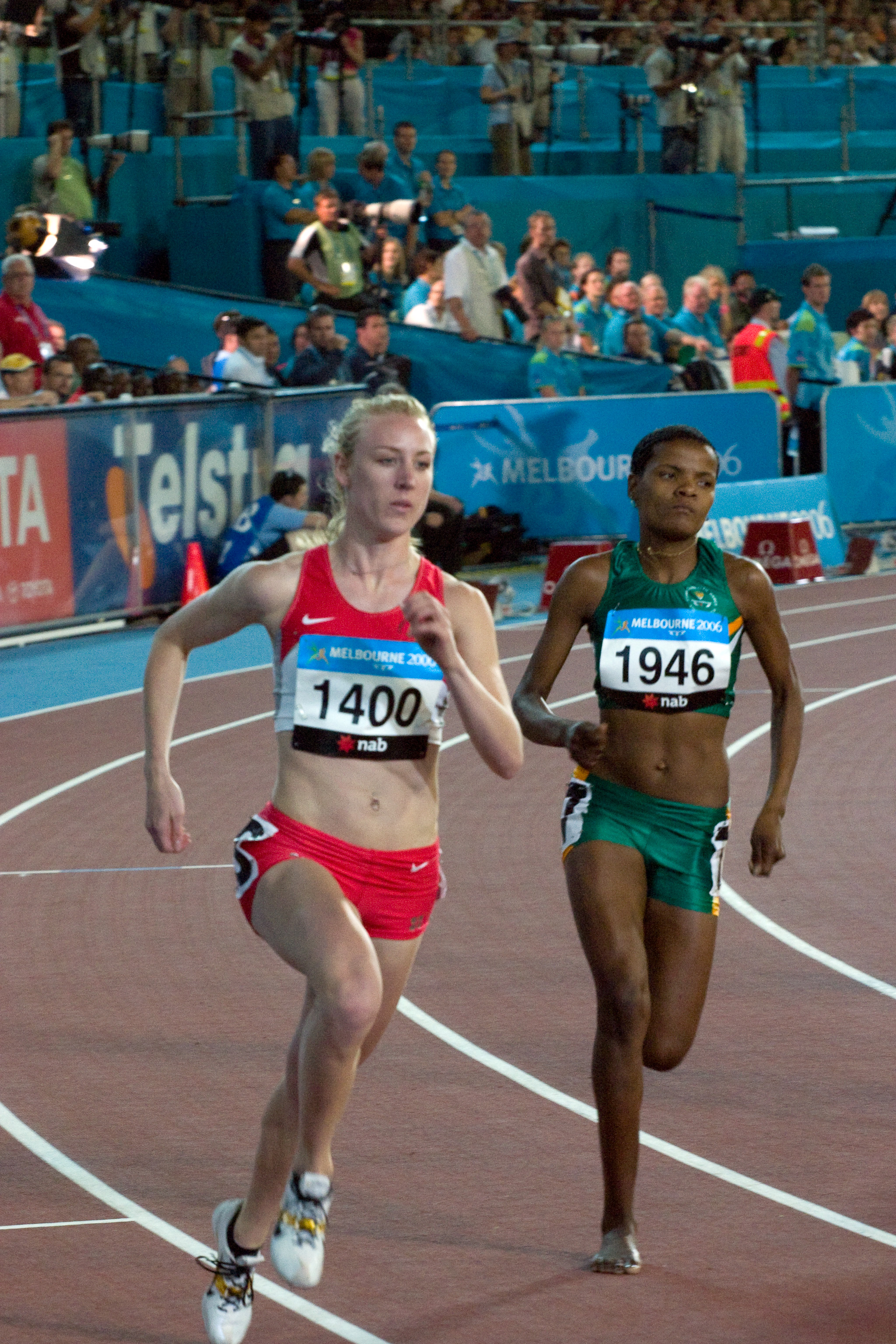
Simpson (left) in the 2006 Commonwealth Games semi-final

As a junior athlete, she finished eighth at the 2001 World Youth Championships, fourth at the 2002 World Junior Championships and won a bronze medal at the 2003 European Junior Championships. She also won the gold medal for England at the 2002 Commonwealth Youth Games.

In 2005 Simpson won a silver at the European Cup, despite only competing as a replacement for the injured Kelly Holmes.

Simpson's highlights of the 2006 season were taking sixth place in the 800 metres final at the 2006 Commonwealth Games and finishing second at the British Championships, behind Rebecca Lyne. She finished 2006, being the fifth fastest British athlete over 800 metres, behind Rebecca Lyne, Susan Scott, Amanda Pritchard and Marilyn Okoro.

After an injury plagued winter, missing many indoor championships and training sessions, Simpson made her major comeback at the British Championships, taking the gold medal, and becoming Britain's number 1 over 800 m. She was then selected for the British team for the 800 m at the 2007 World Championships. At the championships, she qualified into the semi-finals, coming second in her heat with a time of 2:00.47 minutes. In the semi-final she finished sixth with a time of 2:00.48 minutes and failed to qualify for the final. Like Simpson fellow British athletes, Marilyn Okoro and Jenny Meadows both failed at the semi-final stage having finished second in their respective heats. She finished eighth at the 2007 World Athletics Final.

At the 2009 World Championships Simpson went out at the semi-final stage of the 800m.

At the start of the 2010 outdoor season, she set a 1500 m personal best of 4:06.39 at a meeting at Occidental College, in the United States. She also improved her 800m personal best to 1:58.74 at the Diamond League event in Monaco on 22 July 2010.

== Personal bests ==
- 800 metres - 1:58.74 min (2010)
- 1500 metres - 4:06.39 min (2010)
