= Svetlana Klyuka =

Russian middle-distance runner

Svetlana Vasiliyevna Klyuka (Russian: Светлана Васильевна Клюка; born 27 December 1978 in Belogorsk, Amur Oblast) is a Russian middle-distance runner. Klyuka ran the sixth fastest women's 800m time in the world in 2006 (1:57:21 minutes).

== Career ==
She was the winner of the 2005 Universiade and the 2006 European Cup. She was a silver medallist at the 2006 European Athletics Championships and placed fourth at the 2008 Beijing Olympics. She is a three-time participant at the World Championships in Athletics, having reached the final in 2007 and the semi-finals in both 2003 and 2009.

Klyuka received a two-year ban from the sport for doping after her biological passport showed abnormalities. The ban was set for the periods from February 2011 to 2013 and all her performances from 15 August 2009 up to that period were erased.

== Achievements ==
Year	Competition	Venue	Position	Notes
Representing Russia
2005	Universiade	İzmir, Turkey	1st	800 m
2006	European Championships	Gothenburg, Sweden	2nd	800 m
2008	Olympic Games	Beijing, China	4th	800 m
2010	European Championships	Barcelona, Spain	8th (DQ)	800 m
