= Larisa Chzhao =

Russian middle-distance runner

Larisa Chzhao (born 4 February 1971) is a Russian middle-distance runner who specializes in the 800 metres.

In 2005, she won the European Indoor Championships, finished sixth at the World Championships and fifth at the World Athletics Final. She also achieved a personal best time of 1:57.33 minutes from Tula in July.
