= Oksana Zbrozhek =

Russian middle-distance runner

Oksana Zbrozhek (born 12 January 1978) is a Russian middle-distance runner who specializes in the 800 metres.

She won the gold medal at the 2007 European Indoor Championships and the silver medal at the 2009 European Indoor Championships. She also competed at the 2005 European Indoor Championships, but without reaching the final round.

== Personal bests ==
- 800 metres - 1:58.06 min (2004)
- 1500 metres - 4:03.86 min (2009, indoor)
- Mile run - 4:33.73 min (2005)

== See also ==
- List of European Athletics Indoor Championships medalists (women)
