= Hong Mei (athlete) =

Chinese athlete

Personal information
- Born: 11 January 1982 (age 44)

Sport
- Country: China
- Sport: Athletics
- Events: Shot put Discus throw Hammer throw

Achievements and titles
- Personal bests: Shot put: 16.53 m (2000); Discus throw: 53.66 m (2000); Hammer throw: 60.87 m (2004)

Hong Mei (Chinese: 洪梅, born 11 January 1982) is a Chinese female shot putter, discus and hammer thrower, who won two individual gold medal at the Youth World Championships.
