= Marilyn Okoro =

British track and field athlete (born 1984)

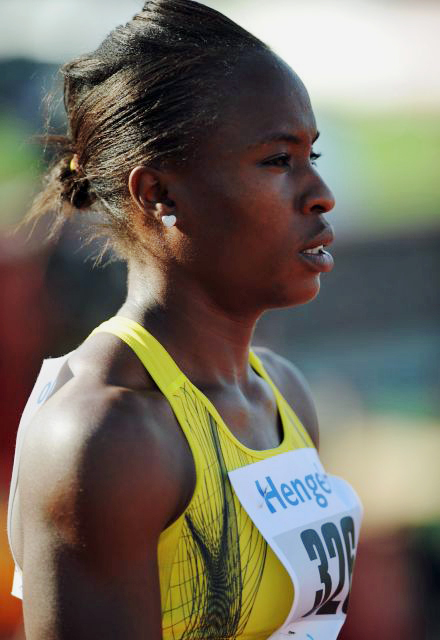
- Okoro at the 2009 FBK Games

Personal information
- Born: 23 September 1984 (age 41) London, England

Sport
- Country: (United Kingdom) Great Britain
- Club: Shaftesbury Barnet Harriers
- Turned pro: 2006
- Retired: Jan 2021

Achievements and titles
- Highest world ranking: 800 m': 7 (2008)
- Personal best: 800 m 1:58.45
Medal record
Representing Great Britain
Women's athletics
Olympic Games
Bronze medal – third place	2008 Beijing	4x400 m relay
World Championships
Bronze medal – third place	2007 Osaka	4x400 m relay
IAAF World Athletics Final
Bronze medal – third place	2007 Stuttgart	800 m
Bronze medal – third place	2008 Stuttgart	800 m
European Championships
Silver medal – second place	2010 Barcelona	4x400 m relay
European Indoor Championships
Silver medal – second place	2009 Torino	4x400 m relay
Silver medal – second place	2011 Paris	4x400 m relay
Bronze medal – third place	2011 Paris	800m
- Updated on 11 October 2008

Marilyn Chinwenwa Okoro (born 23 September 1984, in London) is a British track and field athlete. She finished third in the 800 metres at both the 2007 and 2008 IAAF World Athletics Final. She was on the bronze winning 4 × 400 m relay at the 2007 World Championships in Athletics. She represented Great Britain at the Beijing Olympic Games in 2008 and finished sixth (1:59.53 mins) in the semi-finals. She was part of the 4 × 400 m relay team which finished fifth in the final of the 2008 Summer Olympics although the team was later upgraded to bronze medal position following disqualification for doping offences of the teams finishing in third and fourth place.

She attended Stowe School, Buckinghamshire, and on 26 June 2007 graduated from the University of Bath with a B.A. degree in Politics and French, then starting her first season as a full-time athlete. She speaks four languages (English, French, Spanish and Igbo) and sings in the jazz band The Felonius Monks.

Marilyn suffered an injury plagued 2009 outdoor season, though she battled through the pain barrier to finish a very credible 8th in the World Championships 800 m final in Berlin. Okoro was also included in the squad for the 4 × 400 m, but was not selected in the line-up to run in the final.

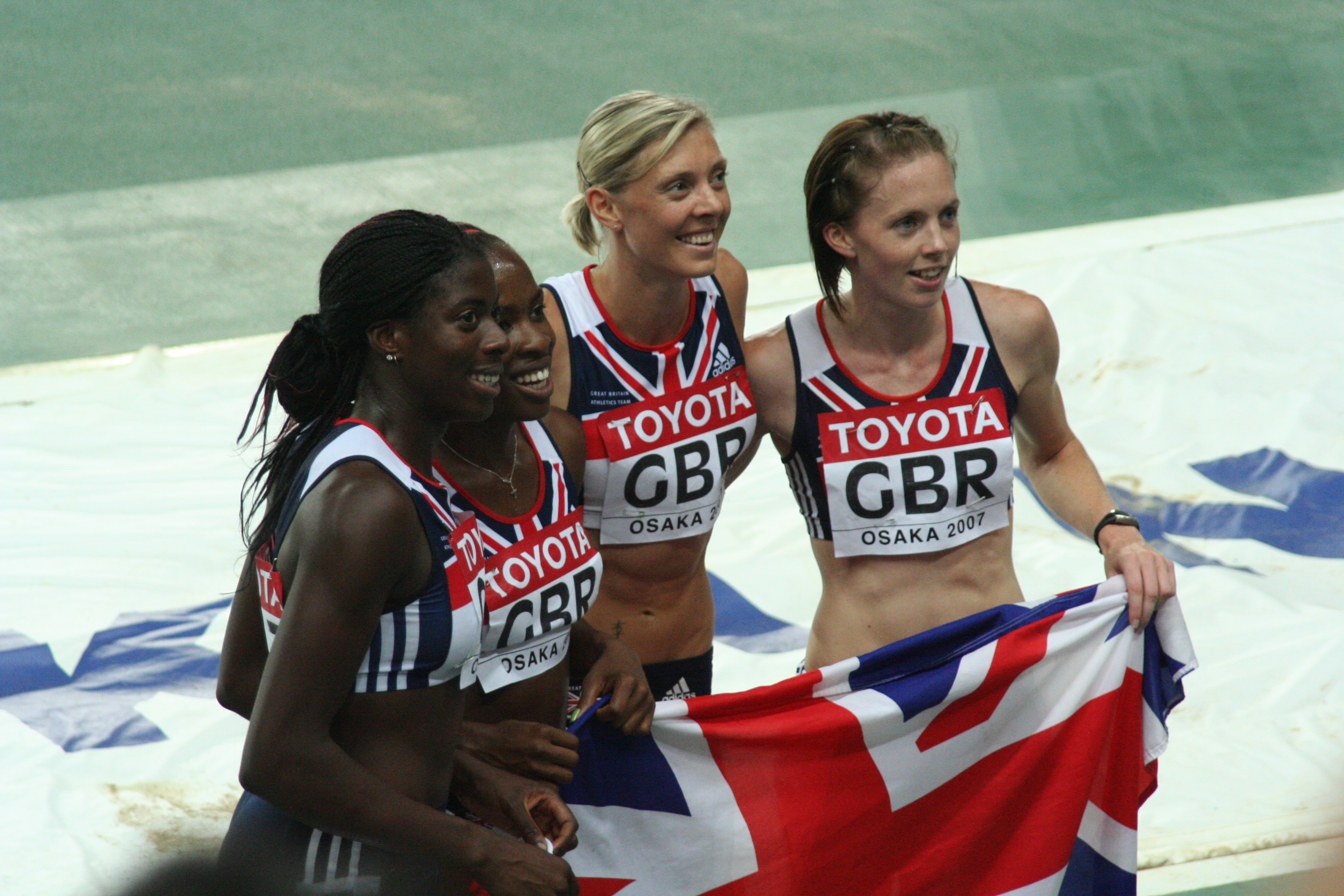
Okoro (second left) at the 2007 World Championships in Osaka with Christine Ohuruogu, Lee McConnell and Nicola Sanders

Marilyn had a limited race schedule in 2010, but returned to a degree of form when taking bronze at the UK championships. Subsequently, Okoro was selected to challenge for a medal in the 800 m alongside Jenny Meadows and Jemma Simpson at the 2010 European Championships in Barcelona. She finished 4th in her semi-final, therefore did not progress to the final. Okoro recovered from that disappointment to run the second leg in the 4 × 400 bronze medal-winning quartet alongside Nicola Sanders, Lee McConnell and Perri Shakes-Drayton, clocking 52.0 seconds for her leg. She also ran in the heat running 51.8 seconds. Vicki Barr replaced Shakes-Drayton in the heats.

Okoro has been criticised heavily for her front running tactics, most notably by UK Athletics head coach Charles Van Commenee, who described Okoro's performance in the 800 m at the 2009 European Athletics Indoor Championships as "naive and unprofessional" despite not ever coaching the 800m. Following her non-selection for the 800 m event at the 2012 Summer Olympics, Okoro accused Van Commenee of being "a bit of a bully."

Marilyn changed coaches during 2013, moving to the US and was coached by Johnny Gray Olympic Bronze Medalist and the then American Record Holder. Her training partners included Team USA's Maggey Vessey and US #2 Duane Soloman. She represented Team England at the 2014 Commonwealth Games in Glasgow, where she ran in the semi-final of the 800m.
