= Wilson Kipketer =

Danish former middle distance runner (born 1972)

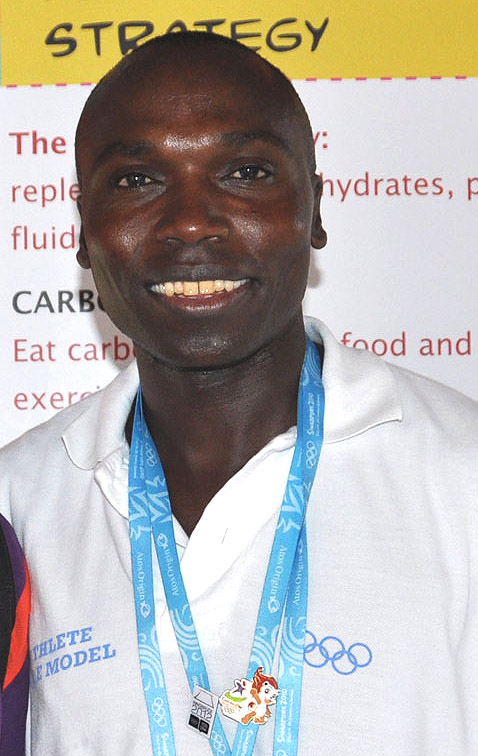
- Kipketer in 2010

Personal information
- Born: 12 December 1972 (age 53) Kapchemoiywo, Nandi County, Kenya
- Height: 1.82 m (5 ft 11 1/2 in)
- Weight: 63 kg (139 lb)

Sport
- Country: Denmark
- Sport: Track and field
Medal record
Men's athletics
Representing Denmark
Event	1st	2nd	3rd
Olympic Games	0	1	1
World Championships	3	0	0
World Indoor Championships	1	2	0
European Championships	1	0	0
Total	5	3	1
Olympic Games
Silver medal – second place	2000 Sydney	800 m
Bronze medal – third place	2004 Athens	800 m
World Championships
Gold medal – first place	1995 Gothenburg	800 m
Gold medal – first place	1997 Athens	800 m
Gold medal – first place	1999 Seville	800 m
World Indoor Championships
Gold medal – first place	1997 Paris	800 m
Silver medal – second place	1999 Maebashi	800 m
Silver medal – second place	2003 Birmingham	800 m
European Championships
Gold medal – first place	2002 Munich	800 m
- Updated on 9 February 2014

Wilson Kosgei Kipketer (born 12 December 1972) is a Danish former middle distance runner. With a personal best of 1:41.11, Kipketer is tied with Emmanuel Wanyonyi as the second fastest of all time over the 800 meter distance, behind David Rudisha. Kipketer set the world record and broke his own record two more times, all in 1997. He dominated the 800 m distance for a decade, remaining undefeated for a three-year period and running 8 of the 17 currently all-time fastest times. He won gold medals in three successive editions of the IAAF World Championships in Athletics. Though unable to compete in the 1996 Olympics near the peak of his career, he earned silver in 2000 and bronze in 2004. Kipketer's 800 meters world record stood for almost 13 years. It was surpassed on 22 August 2010, when David Rudisha beat it by 0.02 seconds, running 1:41.09. Kipketer held the short track world record in the 800 metres from 1997 until 2026.

Kipketer represented both Sparta and KIF during his running career.

== Biography ==
Kipketer was born in Kapchemoiywo, Kenya, into the Nandi tribe (a subgroup of the Kalenjin people).

As a teenager, Kipketer was first noticed by 1968 and 1972 Olympic champion Kip Keino. Keino suggested Kipketer attend the Catholic St. Patrick's High School in Iten that was famous for bringing up young runners. David Rudisha, who surpassed Kipketer's 800m world record in 2010, was also coached by longtime St. Patrick's coach, teacher and former Headmaster Brother Colm O'Connell.

In 1990, Kipketer travelled to Denmark as a foreign exchange student, studying electronic engineering. He liked Denmark so much that he decided to settle there, and eventually applied for Danish citizenship.

Kipketer came to international attention in 1994 when he won 16 of 18 800 meter races, ran the second fastest 800 meters of the year (1:43.29) and was ranked number one in the world by Track and Field News magazine. The next year, he won 10 of 12 races, ran under 1:43 twice (becoming only the second man to break 1:43 twice in one season, after Joaquim Cruz who did it in 1984 & 1985) with his 1:42.87 being the world leader, and he competed for Denmark in the 1995 World Championships. It was there that he claimed his first World Championship title in the 800 metres, pulling away from his competitors in dominating fashion down the homestretch.

However, Kipketer was not a full Danish citizen, and in 1996 the International Olympic Committee disallowed him from competing for Denmark in the Olympic Games in Atlanta, USA. Despite his absence from the Olympics, there was no doubt that Kipketer was the strongest 800 m runner in the world that year. He remained undefeated throughout 1996, including wins over all three 800 meter medalists at the 1996 Olympic Games, and set a new personal best of 1:41.83 in Rieti at the end of the season, the fastest 800 meter time in the world in 12 years and only 0.1 short of the World Record. Despite not participating in the Olympics, Track & Field News magazine ranked him number one in the world in the 800 meters for 1996.

In 1997 Kipketer was at the peak of his career. In March he won the 800 m gold at the Indoor World Championships in Paris, France. In fact, he broke the indoor world record time in the heats by nearly a second, beating Paul Ereng's WR 1:44.84 with his 1:43.96. Then in the final he took yet another second off the world record with a scintillating 1:42.67. On 7 July he tied Sebastian Coe's world record (1:41.73) for the 800 metres at a meeting in Stockholm, Sweden. Coe's record had stood for sixteen years. He went on to break the record twice that year, the first time being in Zürich, Switzerland at the Weltklasse Zürich GP on 13 August when he ran 1:41.24. (His was one of three world records to fall in a 70-minute stretch at this remarkable meet, the other two being the 5,000 meter record to Haile Gebrselassie and the 3,000 meter steeplechase to Wilson Boit Kipketer. (To the latter, he is not related.) Eleven days later, on 24 August, he improved the world record to 1:41.11 at the Grand Prix meet in Cologne, Germany. On 8 August, in the 1997 World Championships in Athletics at the Olympic Stadium, Athens, Greece, he led the race from start to finish, blazing the first 200 meters in 23.47 seconds, and successfully defended the World Championship title he had won in 1995. He was voted Track & Field Athlete of the Year by Track and Field News Magazine.

The following season, Kipketer contracted malaria and at first intended not to race at all. Eventually, he participated in three meets, winning in Monaco and running a swift 1:43.18 in Zürich. At the European Championships in Budapest but made physical contact with the eventual winner Nils Schumann on the final straight and did not win a medal. He came back in 1999 by finishing second at the Indoor World Championships and bettering that with a gold medal at the 1999 World Championship in Seville, Spain. As in 1997, Kipketer was undefeated in 1999, winning all 10 outdoor races and finishing the year ranked number one in the world in the 800m by Track & Field News magazine.

In 2000, he broke the world indoor record in the 1000 metres by running a 2:14.96. However, he raced sparingly outdoors and didn't show the same form he had in previous years, losing three out of the four races he contested. At the 2000 Summer Olympics in Sydney, Australia, Kipketer took silver, finishing 0.06 behind Nils Schumann in a tactical, closely contested 800 metres race.

In 2002, Kipketer won the gold medal at the European Championships in Munich, defeating the reigning world champion, André Bucher and 2000 Olympic champion, Nils Schumann. He also won 8 of the 9 races he contested, had the fastest 800-metre time in the world (1:42.32), and ranked number one in the world for 800 metres for a record sixth time (one more than Mal Whitfield).

Despite fighting injuries, Kipketer continued to compete through the 2003 season gaining a silver medal at the Indoor World Championships at the National Indoor Arena, Birmingham, England but only managing fourth place at the World Championships later that year.

In the 2004 Summer Olympics in Athens, Greece Kipketer had the lead with 80 meters left in the 800 metres final but was passed with 20 meters left by Yuriy Borzakovskiy and Mbulaeni Mulaudzi, Kipketer taking the bronze medal. At 31 years of age he was still running fast times (breaking 1:44 on three occasions) but no longer had the dominant finish he once possessed, winning only one of the six races he contested, and did not race again after 2004. He ended his career with a remarkable record of fast 800 meter times: except for 2001, he ran 1:43 or better every year from 1994 to 2004. His ten years of sub-1:44 800 meter times is unmatched by any other athlete.

During 11 years his coach was Sławomir Nowak (Poland).

He announced his retirement from competitive athletics in August 2005.

== Post-running career ==
He married his Danish girlfriend Pernille in 2000 (also a long-distance athlete).

Kipketer owns property in Monaco, Copenhagen, and Eldoret (Kenya). Kipketer has a son born in 2004.

Despite gaining Danish citizenship, Kipketer resides in Monaco. A 1999 article by Associated Press documents that his choice of residence was made for tax reasons.

Kipketer is today a member of the 'Champions for Peace', a group of more than 70 famous elite athletes committed to serving peace in the world through sport, created by Peace and Sport, a Monaco-based international organization.

== Personal bests ==
Event	Time	Date	Venue
400 m	46.85	1994	
800 m	1:41.11	24 August 1997	Cologne, Germany
800 m	1:42.67 (indoor)	February 1997	Paris, France
1000 m	2:14.96 (indoor)	20 February 2000	Birmingham, United Kingdom
1500 m	3:42.80	1993	
Mile	3:59.57	5 July 1993	Stockholm, Sweden

== See also ==
- List of eligibility transfers in athletics

Records
Preceded by (United Kingdom) Sebastian Coe	Men's 800 metres World Record Holder; 7 July 1997 – 22 August 2010	Succeeded by (Kenya) David Rudisha
Preceded by (United Kingdom) Sebastian Coe	European Record Holder Men's 800 m 7 July 1997 – present	Succeeded by Incumbent
Awards and achievements
Preceded by (Czech Republic) Jan Železný	Men's European Athlete of the Year; 1997	Succeeded by (United Kingdom) Jonathan Edwards
Preceded by (United States) Michael Johnson	Men's Track & Field Athlete of the Year; 1997	Succeeded by (Ethiopia) Haile Gebrselassie
Preceded by Bjarne Riis	Danish Sports Name of the Year; 1997	Succeeded by Eskild Ebbesen, Thomas Ebert, Victor Feddersen, Thomas Poulsen
Preceded by (United States) Michael Johnson	Men's Track & Field ESPY Award; 1998	Succeeded by (United States) Maurice Greene
