= Becky Lyne =

English middle-distance runner (born 1982)

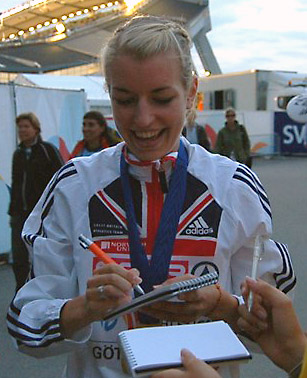
- Becky Lyne signs autographs after winning the 800 m bronze medal at the 2006 European Athletics Championships

Personal information
- Born: 4 July 1982 (age 44) Sheffield, South Yorkshire, England

Sport
- Country: United Kingdom
- Sport: Track and Field
Medal record
European Championships
Bronze medal – third place	2006 Gothenburg	800 m

Becky Lyne (July 4, 1982, Sheffield, South Yorkshire, England) is a former international middle-distance runner from Great Britain, who won a bronze medal in the 800 metres at the 2006 European Athletics Championships.

== Early life ==
Lyne was born on 4 July 1982 in Sheffield, South Yorkshire, England.

She attended Nether Green Junior School where she found her love for running as part of the cross-country team. She was a pupil at Tapton School, which was also attended by the former Olympic middle-distance champion Sebastian Coe.

Following school, Lyne studied Sports Science at Loughborough University where she achieved First Class Honours. She completed a second degree in Spanish at Butler University in Indianapolis, Indiana, United States in 2003, where she competed for the Butler Bulldogs track and field team in the NCAA.

She joined the Hallamshire Harriers Athletics Club in 1994 and success at city and county level soon followed, which eventually led to her first international vest for England in 1997 over 1,500m at the Home Countries International.

Lyne enjoyed a successful junior athletics career under the tutelage of Gordon Surtees, which culminated in winning the 800 metres at the 2003 European Athletics U23 Championships in Bydgoszcz, Poland.

== Professional career ==
Lyne made her first senior international appearance at the 2002 Commonwealth Games in Manchester, where she was knocked out in the heats of the 800 metres.

She suffered a series of injuries over the following two seasons, but nevertheless managed to achieve the B-standard qualifying time for the 2004 Summer Olympics in Athens. However, she was not selected for the event due to the resurgence of Kelly Holmes, who subsequently coached Lyne during the 2008 season.

After moving to Stockport, England in 2005 and beginning to work under coach Dave Turnbull, Lyne had a breakthrough year in 2006. In June, she shot to prominence by finishing second in the 800 metres at the British Grand Prix (athletics) in Gateshead, with a time of 1:58.20 minutes to become the third fastest British female over the distance behind only Holmes and Kirsty Wade.

This was quickly followed up in July when she became British AAA Championships 800 metres champion in Manchester in a time of 2:00.31. Her career highlight was achieved the following month when she won a bronze medal in the 800 metres at the 2006 European Athletics Championships in Gothenburg, Sweden in a time of 1:58.45.

The successes of 2006 led her to be named as BAWA Athlete of the Year alongside friend Mo Farah.

The following season she was selected for the 2007 World Championships in Athletics in Osaka, Japan, but was forced to withdraw from the event due to a calf injury. Further injury curtailments left her short of fitness by the time of the trials for the 2008 Summer Olympics in Beijing, China and as a result was unable to qualify.

She continued to pursue a comeback in subsequent years, spending winters training at altitude in Kenya with the group of friend and rival Janeth Jepkosgei, but was unable to find any consistency and chose to officially retire from the sport in 2012.

== Life After Athletics ==
Lyne now resides in Baslow, Derbyshire, England and lists her main hobbies as dancing and gardening.

In 2014 she founded her own company, TrYumph in Life CIC, with the aim of helping to empower people to lead a healthy life. The company runs a variety of family sports and fitness classes for a range of ages and abilities, in addition to holiday camps for school children and corporate and school wellness programmes.

In 2020 she launched her second company Gracefull Running Ltd. Drawing on her experiences as a top level athlete and her sports science studies, she developed a model that encapsulates key biomechanical elements of how humans are designed to move within a 'GRACEfull' acronym. Working in conjunction with Sheffield Hallam University, these elements were written into joint detection software which the company now uses to perform online running technique analyses and physio screenings.

In collaboration with former competitor Marilyn Okoro, she is involved in an initiative called GRACEfull Girls, which provides performance and wellbeing support to developing female athletes with a focus on long-term participation in sport.

== Charity Work ==
Thanks to her winters spent training there, Lyne maintains close links to Kenya through a number of school twinnings she established between British and Kenyan schools. As well as orchestrating fundraising activities, the relationships offer mutual benefits including cultural and knowledge exchange. She is an ambassador for Shoe4Africa, a charity that helps to save and empower vulnerable women and children and donates 10% of subscriptions for her running groups to the charity.

== Personal Bests ==
Distance	Mark	Date
400 m	54.9	2005
800 m	1:58.20	2006
1000 m	2:48.84	2003
1500 m	4:06.85	2006
mile	4:55.13	2003
parkrun	18:20	2012

== Athletic Achievements ==
- 1999 AAA U20 Junior 800m Champion
- 2001 AAA U20 Junior 800m Champion
- 2001 European Junior 800m 4th
- 2002 BUCS, Bedford, 800m Champion
- 2002 Commonwealth Games Heats 800m 5th
- 2003 European under-23 800m Champion
- 2003 NCAA Division I Outdoor Track Championships, California, 800m 3rd
- 2004 BUCS, Gateshead, 1500m Champion
- 2004 BUCS, Glasgow, 1500m Champion
- 2005 World University Championships, Izmir 8th
- 2006 European Championships, Gothenburg, 800m 3rd
- 2006 Athletics World Cup, Athens, 800m 4th
