= Monika Merl =

German middle-distance runner

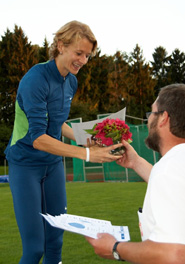
- Monika Merl

Personal information
- Full name: Monika Merl
- Born: 21 September 1979 (age 46) Sztum, Poland
- Height: 1.72 m (5 ft 8 in)

Sport
- Country: Germany
- Sport: Athletics
- Event: 800 metres

Achievements and titles
- Personal best(s): 800 metres: 2:00.16 (Cologne; August 2006)

Monika Merl (née Grądzka; born 21 September 1979 in Sztum, Poland) is a German 800 metre runner and former champion in the 800 meters in Germany.

== Career ==
Merl finished fifth at the 2005 European Indoor Championships and competed at the 2004 World Indoor Championships, 2005 World Championships and the 2006 European Championships without reaching the finals.

Her personal best time is 2:00.16 minutes, achieved in August 2006 in Cologne.

She represented the athletics club TV Wattenscheid 01 prior to her retirement from the sport.
