= Teodora Kolarova =

Bulgarian middle-distance runner

Teodora Kolarova (Bulgarian: Теодора Коларова) (born 29 May 1981 in Varna) is a Bulgarian middle distance runner.

She finished 6th in the 800m final at the 2006 European Athletics Championships in Gothenburg, setting a personal best time in the process. In 2007, she tested positive for testosterone and was banned from competition for two years by the Bulgarian federation.
