= Track and field at the 2015 Military World Games – Women's marathon =

The women's marathon event at the 2015 Military World Games was held on 11 October at the KAFAC Sports Complex.

== Records ==
Prior to this competition, the existing world and CISM record were as follows:

World Record	Paula Radcliffe (GBR)	2:15:25	London, Great Britain	13 April 2003
CISM World Record	Iwona Lewandowska (POL)	2:28:33	Eindhoven, Netherlands	12 October 2014

== Schedule ==
Date	Time	Round
11 October 2015	9:00	Final

== Medalists ==
=== Individual ===
Gold	Silver	Bronze
Iwona Lewandowska; Poland	Yugui Ma; China	Monika Drybulska; Poland

=== Team ===
Gold	Silver	Bronze
Poland; Iwona Lewandowska; Monika Drybulska; Olga Kalendarowa-Ochal	China; Yugui Ma; Chuan Luo; Ruiling Li	United States; Meghan Curran; Emily Shertzer; Brenda Schrank

== Results ==
=== Individual ===
Rank	Name	Nationality	Time	Notes
1st place, gold medalist(s)	Iwona Lewandowska	Poland	2:31:25	
2nd place, silver medalist(s)	Yugui Ma	China	2:31:40	
3rd place, bronze medalist(s)	Monika Drybulska	Poland	2:32:20	
4	Alina Armas	Namibia	2:33:09	
5	Aster Tesfaye	Bahrain	2:34:39	
6	Rasa Drazdauskaitė	Lithuania	2:36:48	
7	Olga Kalendarowa-Ochal	Poland	2:37:47	
8	Chuan Luo	China	2:39:11	
9	Lishan Dula	Bahrain	2:40:02	
10	Anna Naakalako Amutoko	Namibia	2:40:38	
11	Ruiling Li	China	2:41:18	
12	Eunice Jeptoo	Kenya	2:42:27	
13	Bayartsogtyn Mönkhzayaa	Mongolia	2:42:31	
14	Winfrida Kwamboka Nyansikera	Kenya	2:43:13	
15	Meghan Curran	United States	2:51:33	
16	Emily Shertzer	United States	2:51:54	
17	Niluka Geethani Rajasekara	Sri Lanka	2:53:37	
18	Patricia Cabedo Serrano	Spain	2:53:54	
19	Badamkhatan Dovdon	Mongolia	3:01:24	
20	Brenda Schrank	United States	3:05:38	
21	Maria Jansson	Sweden	3:06:10	
22	Marizete Moreira dos Santos	Brazil	3:07:49	
23	Celine Best	Canada	3:07:54	
24	Monika Rausch	Germany	3:08:47	
25	Katherine Lorena Velasquez Caiza	Ecuador	3:11:44	
26	Danielle Krijgsman	Netherlands	3:12:15	
27	Mercy Kalunga	Zambia	3:13:12	
28	María Dolores González Mesa	Spain	3:16:39	
29	Elena Konopleva	France	3:18:43	
30	Genevieve Gobeil	Canada	3:19:29	
31	Alana Cadieux	Canada	3:20:54	
32	Henar Fernandez Ramos	Spain	3:22:11	
33	Enkhbayaryn Ariuntungalag	Mongolia	3:23:07	
34	Erika Farkas	Hungary	3:32:33	
35	Emma Maria Bratt	Sweden	3:37:22	
	Irene Kwambai	Kenya	DNF	
	Svetlana Kliuka	Russia	DNF	
	Merima Mohammed	Bahrain	DNF	
	Arianne beckers	Netherlands	DNF	
	Olena Hudaybergenova	Turkmenistan	3:44:08	
	Aylar Berdiyeva	Turkmenistan	DNF	
	Guljahan Akmyradova	Turkmenistan	DNF	

=== Team ===
Rank	Team	Time	Notes
1st place, gold medalist(s)	Poland	7:41:32	
2nd place, silver medalist(s)	China	7:52:09	
3rd place, bronze medalist(s)	United States	8:49:05	
4	Mongolia	9:07:02	
5	Spain	9:32:44	
6	Canada	9:48:17	
	Bahrain	DQ	
	Kenya	DQ	
	Turkmenistan	DQ	
