= Track and field at the 2015 Military World Games – Men's 5000 metres =

The men's 5000 metres event at the 2015 Military World Games was held on 6 and 8 October at the KAFAC Sports Complex.

== Records ==
Prior to this competition, the existing world and CISM record were as follows:

World Record	Kenenisa Bekele (ETH)	12:37.35	Hengelo, Netherlands	31 May 2004
CISM World Record	Mark Kiptoo (KEN)	13:06.17	Rio de Janeiro, Brazil	23 July 2011

== Schedule ==
Date	Time	Round
6 October 2015	10:00	Round 1
8 October 2015	15:35	Final

== Medalists ==
Gold	Silver	Bronze
Albert Kibichii Rop; Bahrain	Zouhair Aouad; Bahrain	Emmanuel Kipsang; Kenya

== Results ==
=== Round 1 ===
Qualification: First 5 in each heat (Q) and next 5 fastest (q) qualified for the final.

Rank	Heat	Name	Nationality	Time	Notes
1	2	Albert Kibichii Rop	Bahrain	13:50.29	Q
2	2	Tariq Ahmed Al-Amri	Saudi Arabia	13:53.35	Q
3	2	G Lakshmanan	India	13:54.79	Q
4	2	Stephen Arita Omiso	Kenya	14:03.24	Q
5	2	Emmanuel Kipsang	Kenya	14:03.92	Q
6	1	Rabah Aboud	Algeria	14:19.15	Q
7	1	Benjamin Payne	United States	14:19.54	Q
8	1	Zouhair Aouad	Bahrain	14:19.79	Q
9	1	Abdullah Alsalhi	Saudi Arabia	14:20.42	Q
10	1	Pierre Urruty	France	14:27.35	Q
11	1	Ernesto Zamora	Uruguay	14:27.91	q
12	2	MohammadJavad Sayadi	Iran	14:32.56	q
13	2	Andreas Kempf	Switzerland	14:35.21	q
14	2	Nico Sonnenberg	Germany	14:38.90	q
15	1	Mihail Krassilov	Kazakhstan	14:45.01	q
16	2	Cristhian Zamora	Uruguay	14:45.68	
17	1	Xavier Simbaña	Ecuador	14:47.43	
18	1	Thomas Poesiat	Netherlands	14:56.31	
19	2	Luis Cacuango	Ecuador	14:57.67	
20	2	Ali Alwahshi	United Arab Emirates	14:59.92	
21	1	Mubark Rashid Hassan Ahmed Almar	United Arab Emirates	15:01.57	
22	2	Rafael Epesse Ngongue	Angola	15:03.12	
23	1	Byung Hyun Kim	South Korea	15:08.93	
24	1	Bastos Menezes Filipe	Angola	15:19.14	
25	2	Mpundu Mwansa	Zambia	15:26.86	
26	1	Richard Bwalya	Zambia	15:30.82	
27	1	Valentin Betoudji	Chad	15:40.58	
28	1	Matthew Setlack	Canada	15:46.24	
29	2	Milosh Rancic	Macedonia	16:48.29	
	2	Emmanuel Chimdzeka	Malawi	DNS	
	1	Pethias Barclays Gondwe Mdoka	Malawi	DNS	
	2	Ryu Ji-San	South Korea	DNS	

=== Final ===
Rank	Name	Nationality	Time	Notes
1st place, gold medalist(s)	Albert Kibichii Rop	Bahrain	13:23.70	
2nd place, silver medalist(s)	Zouhair Aouad	Bahrain	13:26.19	
3rd place, bronze medalist(s)	Emmanuel Kipsang	Kenya	13:31.48	
4	Tariq Ahmed Al-Amri	Saudi Arabia	13:34.89	
5	Stephen Arita Omiso	Kenya	13:43.03	
6	G Lakshmanan	India	13:45.85	
7	Benjamin Payne	United States	13:54.78	
8	Rabah Aboud	Algeria	14:09.83	
9	Nico Sonnenberg	Germany	14:24.50	
10	Pierre Urruty	France	14:26.30	
11	MohammadJavad Sayadi	Iran	14:29.65	
12	Ernesto Zamora	Uruguay	14:34.76	
13	Andreas Kempf	Switzerland	14:40.01	
14	Mihail Krassilov	Kazakhstan	14:58.15	
	Abdullah Alsalhi	Saudi Arabia	DNF	
