= Track and field at the 2015 Military World Games – Women's 1500 metres =

The women's 1500 metres event at the 2015 Military World Games was held on 7 and 8 October at the KAFAC Sports Complex.

== Records ==
Prior to this competition, the existing world and CISM record were as follows:

| World Record | Genzebe Dibaba (ETH) | 3:50.07 | Fontvieille, Monaco | 17 July 2015 |
| CISM World Record | Helena Javornik (SLO) | 4:07.34 | Zagreb, Croatia | August 1999 |

== Schedule ==
| Date | Time | Round |
|---|---|---|
| 7 October 2015 | 17:30 | Round 1 |
| 8 October 2015 | 14:05 | Final |

== Medalists ==
| Gold | Silver | Bronze |
|---|---|---|
| Selah Jepleting Busienei; Kenya | Margherita Magnani; Italy | Florina Pierdevară; Romania |

== Results ==
=== Round 1 ===
Qualification: First 4 in each heat (Q) and next 4 fastest (q) qualified for the final.

| Rank | Heat | Name | Nationality | Time | Notes |
|---|---|---|---|---|---|
| 1 | 1 | Agnes Jesang | Kenya | 4:20.88 | Q |
| 2 | 2 | Selah Jepleting Busienei | Kenya | 4:22.08 | Q |
| 3 | 2 | Rababe Arafi | Morocco | 4:22.53 | Q |
| 4 | 1 | Margherita Magnani | Italy | 4:22.84 | Q |
| 5 | 2 | Nataliia Lupu | Ukraine | 4:23.23 | Q |
| 6 | 2 | Florina Pierdevară | Romania | 4:23.51 | Q |
| 7 | 2 | Morgan Mosby | United States | 4:25.11 | q |
| 8 | 2 | Juliana Paula dos Santos | Brazil | 4:25.65 | q |
| 9 | 1 | Mariya Shatalova | Ukraine | 4:26.14 | Q |
| 10 | 1 | Angelika Cichocka | Poland | 4:26.54 | Q |
| 11 | 2 | Elina Sujew | Germany | 4:26.71 | q |
| 12 | 1 | Denise Krebs | Germany | 4:27.70 | q |
| 13 | 1 | Gayanthika Abeyratne | Sri Lanka | 4:36.29 | |
| 14 | 2 | Hetaira Palacios Zambrano | Peru | 4:47.15 | |
| 15 | 1 | Georgette Mink | Canada | 4:50.83 | |
| 16 | 2 | Katherin Cardozo | Uruguay | 4:56.05 | |
| 17 | 1 | Blagica Dimitrova | Macedonia | 6:02.06 | |
| | 2 | Marina Arzamasova | Belarus | DNF | |
| | 1 | Marta Hirpato Yota | Bahrain | DNS | |

=== Final ===
| Rank | Name | Nationality | Time | Notes |
|---|---|---|---|---|
| 1st place, gold medalist(s) | Selah Jepleting Busienei | Kenya | 4:07.58 | |
| 2nd place, silver medalist(s) | Margherita Magnani | Italy | 4:11.51 | |
| 3rd place, bronze medalist(s) | Florina Pierdevară | Romania | 4:14.94 | |
| 4 | Mariya Shatalova | Ukraine | 4:15.21 | |
| 5 | Rababe Arafi | Morocco | 4:21.17 | |
| 6 | Juliana Paula dos Santos | Brazil | 4:21.22 | |
| 7 | Morgan Mosby | United States | 4:22.40 | |
| 8 | Elina Sujew | Germany | 4:23.06 | |
| 9 | Agnes Jesang | Kenya | 4:23.10 | |
| 10 | Denise Krebs | Germany | 4:39.15 | |
| | Nataliia Lupu | Ukraine | DNF | |
| | Angelika Cichocka | Poland | DNS | |
