= Track and field at the 2015 Military World Games – Men's 10,000 metres =

The men's 10,000 metres event at the 2015 Military World Games was held on 5 October 2015 at the KAFAC Sports Complex.

== Records ==
Prior to this competition, the existing world and CISM record were as follows:

World Record	Kenenisa Bekele (ETH)	26:17.53	Brussels, Belgium	26 August 2005
CISM World Record	Aloys Nizigama (BDI)	27:47.77		1993

== Schedule ==
Date	Time	Round
5 October 2015	10:40	Final

== Medalists ==
Gold	Silver	Bronze
El Hassan El-Abbassi; Bahrain	Emmanuel Kipsang; Kenya	Hassan Chani; Bahrain

== Results ==
=== Final ===
Rank	Name	Nationality	Time	Notes
1st place, gold medalist(s)	El Hassan El-Abbassi	Bahrain	27:41.76	CR
2nd place, silver medalist(s)	Emmanuel Kipsang	Kenya	28:03.86	
3rd place, bronze medalist(s)	Hassan Chani	Bahrain	28:11.46	
4	Stephen Arita Omiso	Kenya	30:12.16	
5	Agus Prayogo	Indonesia	30:17.97	
6	Luis Cacuango	Ecuador	31:02.78	
7	Na Young-san	South Korea	31:17.21	
8	Mihail Krassilov	Kazakhstan	31:18.06	
9	Mpundu Mwansa	Zambia	31:24.39	
10	Rafael Epesse Ngongue	Angola	31:30.21	
11	Xavier Simbaña	Ecuador	31:34.99	
12	Bastos Menezes Filipe	Angola	31:50.51	
13	Nkosinathi Green Zwane	Swaziland	33:29.82	
14	Richard Sosa	Uruguay	33:36.47	
15	Milosh Rancic	Macedonia	34:23.78	
16	Zhan Tosev	Macedonia	34:41.40	
17	Stefan Lopatic	Bosnia and Herzegovina	35:27.38	
	Valentin Betoudji	Chad	DNF	
	Yang Dinghong	China	DNS	
	Pethias Barclays Gondwe Mdoka	Malawi	DNS	
	Emmanuel Chimdzeka	Malawi	DNS	
