= Athletics at the 2013 Summer Universiade – Women's 800 metres =

The women's 800 metres event at the 2013 Summer Universiade was held on 7–9 July.

== Medalists ==
Gold	Silver	Bronze
Margarita Mukasheva; Kazakhstan	Ekaterina Kupina; Russia	Eglė Balčiūnaitė; Lithuania

== Results ==
=== Heats ===
Qualification: First 3 in each heat (Q) and the next 4 fastest (q) qualified for the semifinals.

Rank	Heat	Name	Nationality	Time	Notes
1	2	Margarita Mukasheva	Kazakhstan	2:03.18	Q
2	2	Helen Crofts	Canada	2:04.00	Q
3	2	Ciara Everard	Ireland	2:04.34	Q, PB
4	3	Angie Smit	New Zealand	2:04.68	Q
5	3	Jessica Smith	Canada	2:05.11	Q
6	3	Winnie Nanyondo	Uganda	2:05.25	Q
7	3	Olga Zaporojan	Moldova	2:05.94	q, PB
8	4	Elena Kotulskaya	Russia	2:05.96	Q
9	3	Martine Nobili	Luxembourg	2:06.35	q, PB
10	4	Anne Kesselring	Germany	2:06.38	Q
11	4	Natalja Piliusina	Lithuania	2:06.91	Q
12	1	Ekaterina Kupina	Russia	2:07.74	Q
13	1	Eglė Balčiūnaitė	Lithuania	2:08.36	Q
14	4	Ida Fillingsnes	Norway	2:08.51	q, PB
15	1	Danuta Urbanik	Poland	2:10.56	Q
16	2	Ninfa Barnard	U.S. Virgin Islands	2:10.86	q
17	1	Taylor-Ashley Bean	Bermuda	2:16.48	
18	4	Jevgenia Mateitshuk	Estonia	2:17.93	
19	4	Dilshoda Rahmonova	Tajikistan	2:19.64	
20	3	Iao Si Teng	Macau	2:26.36	
21	1	Fezile Ngwenyama	Swaziland	2:26.59	
22	2	Moleboheng Mafata	Lesotho	2:31.38	
23	1	Saldoru Thuppaige	Sri Lanka	2:33.57	
24	2	Woroud Sawalha	Palestine	2:37.27	
	2	Docus Ajok	Uganda	DSQ	
	1	Elisabeth Mandaba	Central African Republic	DNS	
	3	Corlia Kruger	Namibia	DNS	
	4	Salamatu Sesay	Sierra Leone	DNS	

=== Semifinals ===
Qualification: First 3 in each heat (Q) and the next 4 fastest (q) qualified for the semifinals.

Rank	Heat	Name	Nationality	Time	Notes
1	1	Ekaterina Kupina	Russia	2:00.76	Q
2	1	Margarita Mukasheva	Kazakhstan	2:00.92	Q
3	2	Elena Kotulskaya	Russia	2:01.23	Q
4	2	Eglė Balčiūnaitė	Lithuania	2:01.33	Q, SB
5	1	Helen Crofts	Canada	2:01.35	Q, PB
6	1	Angie Smit	New Zealand	2:01.51	q, SB
7	1	Natalja Piliusina	Lithuania	2:01.59	q, PB
8	2	Jessica Smith	Canada	2:01.61	Q
9	1	Danuta Urbanik	Poland	2:02.89	SB
10	2	Winnie Nanyondo	Uganda	2:02.96	
11	2	Ciara Everard	Ireland	2:05.59	
12	1	Martine Nobili	Luxembourg	2:06.16	PB
13	2	Anne Kesselring	Germany	2:09.01	
14	2	Ida Fillingsnes	Norway	2:09.68	
15	2	Olga Zaporojan	Moldova	2:10.87	
16	1	Ninfa Barnard	U.S. Virgin Islands	2:11.37	

=== Final ===
Rank	Name	Nationality	Time	Notes
1st place, gold medalist(s)	Margarita Mukasheva	Kazakhstan	1:58.96	NR
2nd place, silver medalist(s)	Ekaterina Kupina	Russia	1:59.57	
3rd place, bronze medalist(s)	Eglė Balčiūnaitė	Lithuania	1:59.82	SB
4	Angie Smit	New Zealand	2:00.03	PB
5	Elena Kotulskaya	Russia	2:00.35	
6	Jessica Smith	Canada	2:00.43	SB
7	Helen Crofts	Canada	2:03.30	
8	Natalja Piliusina	Lithuania	2:04.62	
