= Track and field at the 2015 Military World Games – Women's 800 metres =

The women's 800 metres event at the 2015 Military World Games was held on 5 October at the KAFAC Sports Complex.

== Records ==
Prior to this competition, the existing world and CISM record were as follows:

World Record	Jarmila Kratochvílová (TCH)	1:53.28	Munich, West Germany	26 July 1983
CISM World Record	Natalya Dukhnova (BLR)	2:00.84	Zagreb, Croatia	August 1999

== Schedule ==
Date	Time	Round
5 October 2015	17:00	Final

== Medalists ==
Gold	Silver	Bronze
Nataliia Lupu; Ukraine	Marina Arzamasova; Belarus	Angelika Cichocka; Poland

== Results ==
=== Final ===
Rank	Lane	Name	Nationality	Time	Notes
1st place, gold medalist(s)	3	Nataliia Lupu	Ukraine	1:59.99	CR
2nd place, silver medalist(s)	7	Marina Arzamasova	Belarus	2:00.57	
3rd place, bronze medalist(s)	5	Angelika Cichocka	Poland	2:00.72	
4	6	Florina Pierdevară	Romania	2:00.91	
5	4	Selah Jepleting Busienei	Kenya	2:03.01	
6	8	Mihaela Roxana Nunu	Romania	2:03.23	
7	1	Marta Hirpato Yota	Bahrain	2:07.52	
8	2	Annette Eichenberger	United States	2:07.61	
