= Track and field at the 2015 Military World Games =

- Dates: 4–11 October
- Host city: Mungyeong, South Korea
- Venue: KAFAC Sports Complex
- Events: 40
- Records set: 12

The track and field competition at the 2015 Military World Games was held from 4–11 October 2015 at the KAFAC Sports Complex in Mungyeong. The stadium is named after the Korea Armed Forces Athletic Corps. The marathon races took place on 11 October and followed a route around the city with a finish point at the track and field main stadium. A number of para-athletics exhibition events were added to the programme for the first time, covering men's and women's shot put, and track races over 100 m, 200 m, and 1500 m for men.

The programme expanded to contain 40 athletics events – a new high. In track and field there were 20 events for men and 18 for women, while the marathon had individual and team aspects for both sexes (the team format being a new addition). Men's hammer throw, women's 400 metres hurdles, high jump and shot put all returned to the programme after being dropped at the previous edition. Women's discus throw made its debut at the games. The women's 10,000 metres was not contested on this occasion, however.

After an absence from the 2011 games, Russia returned and topped the medal table in the sport for the third time in its history. It sent a full strength team and came away with ten gold medals among a haul of nineteen. Bahrain has its most successful edition in clear second place with six golds and twelve medals in total (all its medallists were African-born). China had the third highest gold medals, with four, while Poland had the third greatest medal total at ten. Thirty nations reached the medal table. The host nation won one medal – a gold courtesy of men's pole vaulter Jin Min-sub.

A total of twelve games records were broken or equalled in the athletics competitions. Two athletes defended their 2011 titles: men's javelin thrower Ari Mannio and women's hammer thrower Zhang Wenxiu. It was Zhang's fourth successive gold medal, retaining her position as the only woman to win the event since its introduction in 2003, and she also improved the games record for a fourth time straight. The only athlete to win two individual titles, Ekaterina Koneva claimed a horizontal jumps double for Russia. Rosângela Santos won the most medals with a 100 metres individual and relay title double as well as a 200 metres bronze.

Four champions from the 2015 World Championships in Athletics were in attendance. Russia's Sergey Shubenkov (110 m hurdles) and Mariya Kuchina (high jump) won their disciplines, but Maryna Arzamasova (800 m) and Piotr Małachowski (discus throw) were both beaten into runner-up spots on the world military stage. Seventeen-year-old World Youth champion Salwa Eid Naser became the youngest winner of the women's 400 m title.

== Records ==
| Name | Event | Country | Record | Type |
|---|---|---|---|---|
| Yousef Masrahi | Men's 400 metres | Saudi Arabia | 45.18 | GR |
| Ali Al-Deraan | Men's 800 metres | Saudi Arabia | 1:45.50 | GR |
| Majd Eddin Ghazal | Men's high jump | Syria | 2.31 m | GR, NR |
| El Hassan El-Abbassi | Men's 10,000 metres | Bahrain | 27:41.76 | GR |
| Rosângela Santos | Women's 100 metres | Brazil | 11.17 | GR |
| Nataliia Lupu | Women's 800 metres | Ukraine | 1:59.99 | GR |
| Ruth Jebet | Women's 3000 metres steeplechase | Bahrain | 9:30.24 | GR |
| Kemi Adekoya | Women's 400 metres hurdles | Bahrain | 55.30 | GR= |
| Zhang Li | Women's javelin throw | China | 62.95 m | GR |
| Zhang Wenxiu | Women's hammer throw | China | 74.87 m | GR |
| Ekaterina Koneva | Women's triple jump | Russia | 14.28 m | GR |
| Ekaterina Renzhina; Nadezhda Kotlyarova; Kseniya Ryzhova; Antonina Krivoshapka | Women's 4 × 400 metres relay | Russia | 3:28.75 | GR |

== Medal summary ==
=== Men ===
| Event | Gold | | Silver | | Bronze | |
|---|---|---|---|---|---|---|
| 100 metres | Barakat Al-Harthi (OMA) | 10.16 NR | Reza Ghasemi (IRI) | 10.18 | Aziz Ouhadi (MAR) | 10.25 |
| 200 metres | Eseosa Desalu (ITA) | 20.64 | Serhiy Smelyk (UKR) | 20.74 | Aldemir da Silva Junior (BRA) | 20.77 |
| 400 metres | Yousef Masrahi (KSA) | 45.18 GR | Arokia Rajiv (IND) | 45.57 | Abubakar Abbas (BHR) | 45.73 |
| 800 metres | Ali Al-Deraan (KSA) | 1:45.50 GR | Jackson Kivuva (KEN) | 1:45.70 | Marcin Lewandowski (POL) | 1:46.36 |
| 1500 metres | Fouad Elkaam (MAR) | 3:44.79 | Benson Seurei (BHR) | 3:44.98 | Said Aden Said (QAT) | 3:45.64 |
| 5000 metres | Albert Kibichii Rop (BHR) | 13:23.70 | Zouhair Aouad (BHR) | 13:26.19 | Emmanuel Kipsang (KEN) | 13:31.48 |
| 10,000 metres | El Hassan El-Abbassi (BHR) | 27:41.76 GR | Emmanuel Kipsang (KEN) | 28:03.86 | Hassan Chani (BHR) | 28:11.46 |
| 110 m hurdles | Sergey Shubenkov (RUS) | 13.43 | Artur Noga (POL) | 13.79 | Dominik Bochenek (POL) | 13.84 |
| 400 m hurdles | Abdelmalik Lahoulou (ALG) | 49.43 | Timofey Chalyy (RUS) | 49.88 | Boniface Mucheru Tumuti (KEN) | 49.91 |
| 3000 m s'chase | Amor Ben Yahia (TUN) | 8:24.68 | Patrick Chukor (KEN) | 8:25.54 | Yoann Kowal (FRA) | 8:26.71 |
| 4 × 100 m relay | Poland (POL); Robert Kubaczyk; Grzegorz Zimniewicz; Kamil Masztak; Dariusz Kuć | 39.35 | Dominican Republic (DOM); Mayobanex de Óleo; Yohandris Andújar; Stanly del Carmen; Yancarlos Martínez | 39.41 | Sri Lanka (SRI); Vinoj Muthumuni; Mohamed Abdul Ladeef; Mohamed Abdul Rasheed; Yupun Abeykoon | 39.43 |
| 4 × 400 m relay | Russia (RUS); Timofey Chalyy; Denis Alekseyev; Ivan Shablyuev; Pavel Ivashko | 3:03.01 | Algeria (ALG); Miloud Laredj; Soufiane Bouhadda; Larbi Bourrada; Abdelmalik Lahoulou | 3:03.78 | Venezuela (VEN); Arturo Ramírez; Alberth Bravo; José Meléndez; Freddy Mezones | 3:04.10 |
| Marathon | Alemu Bekele (BHR) | 2:15:07 | Marcin Chabowski (POL) | 2:15:37 | Linus Chumba (KEN) | 2:16:51 |
| Team marathon | Poland (POL); Błażej Brzeziński; Marcin Chabowski; Henryk Szost | 6:51:23 | Ecuador (ECU); Manuel Cañar Sandoval; Angel Chasi Toalombo; Marco Erazo Montero | 7:07:23 | Kenya (KEN); William Chebor; Linus Chumba; Paul Malakwen Kosgei | 7:08:00 |
| High jump | Majd Eddin Ghazal (SYR) | 2.31 m GR, NR | Daniil Tsyplakov (RUS) | 2.28 m | Mohammadreza Vazifedoost (IRI) | 2.24 m |
| Pole vault | Jin Min-sub (KOR) | 5.40 m | Georgiy Gorokhov (RUS) | 5.30 m | Paweł Wojciechowski (POL) | 5.20 m |
| Long jump | Pavel Shalin (RUS) | 7.66 m | Valentin Toboc (ROM) | 7.64 m | Lu Tianje (CHN) | 7.63 m |
| Triple jump | Dmitriy Sorokin (RUS) | 17.01 m | Aleksey Fyodorov (RUS) | 16.56 m | Adrian Świderski (POL) | 16.55 m |
| Shot put | Darlan Romani (BRA) | 20.08 m | Bob Bertemes (LUX) | 19.60 m | Georgi Ivanov (BUL) | 19.37 m |
| Discus throw | Zoltán Kővágó (HUN) | 66.01 m | Piotr Małachowski (POL) | 62.12 m | Mahmoud Samimi (IRI) | 60.97 m |
| Hammer throw | Kirill Ikonnikov (RUS) | 75.88 m | Yevhen Vynohradov (UKR) | 74.77 m | Guo Kun (CHN) | 66.98 m |
| Javelin throw | Ari Mannio (FIN) | 79.78 m | Júlio César de Oliveira (BRA) | 78.62 m | Johannes Vetter (GER) | 77.37 m |

=== Women ===
| Event | Gold | | Silver | | Bronze | |
|---|---|---|---|---|---|---|
| 100 metres | Rosângela Santos (BRA) | 11.17 GR | Nataliya Pohrebnyak (UKR) | 11.46 | Marika Popowicz (POL) | 11.50 |
| 200 metres | Edidiong Odiong (BHR) | 23.18 | Anna Kiełbasińska (POL) | 23.33 | Rosângela Santos (BRA) | 23.38 |
| 400 metres | Salwa Eid Naser (BHR) | 51.39 | Bianca Răzor (ROM) | 51.81 | Nataliya Pyhyda (UKR) | 51.99 |
| 800 metres | Nataliia Lupu (UKR) | 1:59.99 GR | Maryna Arzamasova (BLR) | 2:00.57 | Angelika Cichocka (POL) | 2:00.72 |
| 1500 metres | Selah Busienei (KEN) | 4:07.58 | Margherita Magnani (ITA) | 4:11.51 | Florina Pierdevara (ROM) | 4:14.94 |
| 5000 metres | Pauline Korikwiang (KEN) | 15:23.85 | Volha Mazuronak (BLR) | 15:35.21 | Sabrina Mockenhaupt (GER) | 15:35.75 |
| 100 m hurdles | Yekaterina Galitskaya (RUS) | 13.06 | Katsiaryna Paplauskaya (BLR) | 13.29 | Nina Morozova (RUS) | 13.38 |
| 400 m hurdles | Kemi Adekoya (BHR) | 55.30 GR | Hanna Ryzhykova (UKR) | 55.74 | Vania Stambolova (BUL) | 57.45 |
| 3000 m s'chase | Ruth Jebet (BHR) | 9:30.24 GR | Agnes Jesang (KEN) | 9:40.69 | Tigest Mekonen (BHR) | 9:41.46 |
| 4 × 100 m relay | Brazil (BRA); Aline Torres Sena; Vitória Cristina Rosa; Franciela Krasucki; Rosângela Santos | 43.87 | Russia (RUS); Yekaterina Galitskaya; Nadezhda Kotlyarova; Ekaterina Renzhina; Nina Morozova | 44.20 | China (CHN); Xie Zeru; Wang Xuan; Yang Hongguang; Huang Guifen | 45.05 |
| 4 × 400 m relay | Russia (RUS); Ekaterina Renzhina; Nadezhda Kotlyarova; Kseniya Ryzhova; Antonina Krivoshapka | 3:28.75 GR | Ukraine (UKR); Olha Zemlyak; Nataliya Pyhyda; Hanna Ryzhykova; Nataliia Lupu | 3:30.66 | Bahrain (BHR); Salwa Eid Naser; Edidiong Odiong; Iman Essa; Kemi Adekoya | 3:32.62 NR |
| Marathon | Iwona Lewandowska (POL) | 2:31:25 | Ma Yugui (CHN) | 2:31:40 | Monika Stefanowicz (POL) | 2:32:20 |
| Team marathon | Poland (POL); Olha Kalendarova-Ochal; Iwona Lewandowska; Monika Stefanowicz | 7:41:32 | China (CHN); Li Ruiling; Luo Chuan; Ma Yugui | 7:52:09 | United States (USA); Meghan Curran; Brenda Schrank; Emily Shertzer | 8:49:05 |
| High jump | Mariya Kuchina (RUS) | 1.95 m | Iryna Herashchenko (UKR) | 1.84 m | Alina Rotaru (ROM) | 1.80 m |
| Long jump | Ekaterina Koneva (RUS) | 6.39 m | Volha Sudarava (BLR) | 6.36 m | Alina Rotaru (ROM) | 6.33 m |
| Triple jump | Ekaterina Koneva (RUS) | 14.28 m GR | Yulimar Rojas (VEN) | 13.82 m | Ana José (DOM) | 13.80 m |
| Shot put | Gao Yang (CHN) | 18.14 m | Irina Tarasova (RUS) | 17.90 m | Auriol Dongmo Mekemnang (CMR) | 17.64 m |
| Discus throw | Feng Bin (CHN) | 62.07 m | Andressa de Morais (BRA) | 59.07 m | Yuliya Maltseva (RUS) | 57.52 m |
| Hammer throw | Zhang Wenxiu (CHN) | 74.87 m GR | Anna Bulgakova (RUS) | 68.01 m | Rosa Rodríguez (VEN) | 67.54 m |
| Javelin throw | Zhang Li (CHN) | 62.95 m GR | Jucilene de Lima (BRA) | 57.99 m | Nadeeka Lakmali (SRI) | 55.79 m |

== Medal table ==
* Host nation (South Korea)

| Rank | Nation | Gold | Silver | Bronze | Total |
|---|---|---|---|---|---|
| 1 | Russia | 10 | 7 | 2 | 19 |
| 2 | Bahrain | 7 | 2 | 4 | 13 |
| 3 | Poland | 4 | 4 | 7 | 15 |
| 4 | China | 4 | 2 | 3 | 9 |
| 5 | Brazil | 3 | 3 | 2 | 8 |
| 6 | Kenya | 2 | 4 | 4 | 10 |
| 7 | Saudi Arabia | 2 | 0 | 0 | 2 |
| 8 | Ukraine | 1 | 6 | 1 | 8 |
| 9 | Algeria | 1 | 1 | 0 | 2 |
| 9 | Italy | 1 | 1 | 0 | 2 |
| 11 | Morocco | 1 | 0 | 1 | 2 |
| 12 | Finland | 1 | 0 | 0 | 1 |
| 12 | Hungary | 1 | 0 | 0 | 1 |
| 12 | Oman | 1 | 0 | 0 | 1 |
| 12 | South Korea* | 1 | 0 | 0 | 1 |
| 12 | Syria | 1 | 0 | 0 | 1 |
| 12 | Tunisia | 1 | 0 | 0 | 1 |
| 18 | Belarus | 0 | 4 | 0 | 4 |
| 19 | Romania | 0 | 2 | 3 | 5 |
| 20 | Iran | 0 | 1 | 2 | 3 |
| 20 | Venezuela | 0 | 1 | 2 | 3 |
| 22 | Dominican Republic | 0 | 1 | 1 | 2 |
| 23 | Ecuador | 0 | 1 | 0 | 1 |
| 23 | India | 0 | 1 | 0 | 1 |
| 23 | Luxembourg | 0 | 1 | 0 | 1 |
| 26 | Bulgaria | 0 | 0 | 2 | 2 |
| 26 | Germany | 0 | 0 | 2 | 2 |
| 28 | Cameroon | 0 | 0 | 1 | 1 |
| 28 | France | 0 | 0 | 1 | 1 |
| 28 | Qatar | 0 | 0 | 1 | 1 |
| 28 | Sri Lanka | 0 | 0 | 1 | 1 |
| 28 | United States | 0 | 0 | 1 | 1 |
| Totals (32 entries) | | 42 | 42 | 41 | 125 |
