= 2013 European Athletics Indoor Championships – Women's 800 metres =

The women's 800 metres event at the 2013 European Athletics Indoor Championships was held on March 1, 2013, at 17:40 (round 1), March 2, 17:30 (semi-final) and March 3, 11:45 (final) local time.

== Records ==
Standing records prior to the 2013 European Athletics Indoor Championships
World record	Jolanda Čeplak (SLO)	1:55.82	Vienna, Austria	3 March 2002
European record	Jolanda Čeplak (SLO)	1:55.82	Vienna, Austria	3 March 2002
Championship record	Jolanda Čeplak (SLO)	1:55.82	Vienna, Austria	3 March 2002
World Leading	Yekaterina Kupina (RUS)	1:59.58	Belgorod, Russia	3 February 2013
European Leading	Yekaterina Kupina (RUS)	1:59.58	Belgorod, Russia	3 February 2013

== Results ==
=== Round 1 ===
Qualification: First 3 (Q) and the 3 fastest athletes (q) advanced to the semi-finals.

Rank	Heat	Athlete	Nationality	Time	Note
1	1	Yelena Kotulskaya	Russia	2:02.35	Q
2	1	Nataliya Lupu	Ukraine	2:02.55	Q, SB
3	1	Jennifer Meadows	Great Britain	2:02.88	Q
4	1	Selina Büchel	Switzerland	2:03.24	q
5	3	Rose-Anne Galligan	Ireland	2:03.62	Q
6	3	Olha Lyakhova	Ukraine	2:04.12	Q
7	2	Ciara Everard	Ireland	2:04.33	Q
8	1	Teodora Kolarova	Bulgaria	2:04.53	q
9	3	Aníta Hinriksdóttir	Iceland	2:04.72	Q
10	2	Marina Arzamasova	Belarus	2:04.77	Q
11	2	Lenka Masná	Czech Republic	2:04.87	Q
12	3	Paula Habovstiaková	Slovakia	2:04.93	q, PB
13	2	Anna Rostkowska	Poland	2:05.95	
	2	Marta Milani	Italy	DQ	R 163.3b
	3	Luiza Gega	Albania	DQ	R 163.3b
	3	Kim Baglietto	Gibraltar	DNF	

=== Semi-final ===
Qualification: First 3 (Q) advanced to the final.

Rank	Heat	Athlete	Nationality	Time	Note
1	1	Jennifer Meadows	Great Britain	2:01.02	Q, SB
2	1	Marina Arzamasova	Belarus	2:01.22	Q, SB
3	1	Olha Lyakhovaya	Ukraine	2:01.32	Q, PB
4	1	Selina Büchel	Switzerland	2:01.64	PB
5	1	Rose-Anne Galligan	Ireland	2:02.84	PB
6	2	Yelena Kotulskaya	Russia	2:03.05	Q
7	2	Nataliya Lupu	Ukraine	2:03.26	Q
8	2	Ciara Everard	Ireland	2:03.40	Q
9	2	Lenka Masná	Czech Republic	2:03.40	
10	1	Teodora Kolarova	Bulgaria	2:03.65	SB
11	2	Aníta Hinriksdóttir	Iceland	2:04.72	
12	2	Paula Habovstiaková	Slovakia	2:06.37	

=== Final ===
The final was held at 11:45.

Rank	Athlete	Nationality	Time	Note
1st place, gold medalist(s)	Nataliya Lupu	Ukraine	2:00.26	SB
2nd place, silver medalist(s)	Yelena Kotulskaya	Russia	2:00.98	
3rd place, bronze medalist(s)	Marina Arzamasova	Belarus	2:01.21	SB
4	Jennifer Meadows	Great Britain	2:01.52	
5	Olha Lyakhova	Ukraine	2:02.12	
6	Ciara Everard	Ireland	2:02.55	
