= 2009 European Athletics U23 Championships – Women's 800 metres =

The women's 800 metres event at the 2009 European Athletics U23 Championships was held in Kaunas, Lithuania, at S. Dariaus ir S. Girėno stadionas (Darius and Girėnas Stadium) on 16 and 18 July.

== Medalists ==
Gold	Yelena Kofanova; Russia
Silver	Nataliya Lupu; Ukraine
Bronze	Agnieszka Leszczyńska; Poland

== Results ==
=== Final ===
18 July

Rank	Name	Nationality	Time	Notes
1st place, gold medalist(s)	Yelena Kofanova	Russia	1:58.94	CR
2nd place, silver medalist(s)	Nataliya Lupu	Ukraine	2:01.08	
3rd place, bronze medalist(s)	Agnieszka Leszczyńska	Poland	2:01.53	
4	Aleksandra Uvarova	Russia	2:01.87	
5	Emma Jackson	Great Britain	2:02.09	
6	Eglė Balčiūnaitė	Lithuania	2:02.26	
7	Olha Yekymenko	Ukraine	2:03.56	
8	Olga Cristea	Moldova	2:04.36	

=== Heats ===
16 July
Qualified: first 2 in each heat and 2 best to the Final

==== Heat 1 ====
Rank	Name	Nationality	Time	Notes
1	Olga Cristea	Moldova	2:03.05	Q
2	Aleksandra Uvarova	Russia	2:03.16	Q
3	Olha Yekymenko	Ukraine	2:03.33	q
4	Annett Horna	Germany	2:03.46	
5	Volha Rulevich	Belarus	2:05.75	
6	Eleni Theodorakopoulou	Greece	2:07.07	
7	Heidi Pappila	Finland	2:12.22	

==== Heat 2 ====
Rank	Name	Nationality	Time	Notes
1	Yelena Kofanova	Russia	2:00.33	Q
2	Agnieszka Leszczyńska	Poland	2:01.91	Q
3	Machteld Mulder	Netherlands	2:05.31	
4	Tara Bird	Great Britain	2:05.67	
5	Karin Storbacka	Finland	2:05.73	
6	Laura Crowe	Ireland	2:07.12	
	Margherita Magnani	Italy	DNF	

==== Heat 3 ====
Rank	Name	Nationality	Time	Notes
1	Emma Jackson	Great Britain	2:02.43	Q
2	Nataliya Lupu	Ukraine	2:02.74	Q
3	Eglė Balčiūnaitė	Lithuania	2:03.29	q
4	Anja Puc	Slovenia	2:06.73	
5	Ophélie Claude-Boxberger	France	2:06.82	
6	María Carmen González	Spain	2:07.05	
7	Agnieszka Miernik	Poland	2:08.05	

== Participation ==
According to an unofficial count, 21 athletes from 16 countries participated in the event.

- Belarus (1)
- Finland (2)
- France (1)
- Germany (1)
- Great Britain (2)
- Greece (1)
- Ireland (1)
- Italy (1)
- Lithuania (1)
- Moldova (1)
- Netherlands (1)
- Poland (2)
- Russia (2)
- Slovenia (1)
- Spain (1)
- Ukraine (2)
