= Jepleting =

Jepleting is a surname of Kenyan origin. Notable people with the surname include:

- Priscah Jepleting Cherono (born 1980), Kenyan long-distance track runner
- Selah Jepleting Busienei (born 1991), Kenyan middle-distance runner
