= 2008 World Junior Championships in Athletics – Women's 800 metres =

The women's 800 metres event at the 2008 World Junior Championships in Athletics was held in Bydgoszcz, Poland, at Zawisza Stadium on 8, 9 and 11 July.

== Medalists ==
Gold	Elena Mirela Lavric; Romania
Silver	Merve Aydın; Turkey
Bronze	Machteld Mulder; Netherlands

== Results ==
=== Final ===
11 July

Rank	Name	Nationality	Time	Notes
1st place, gold medalist(s)	Elena Mirela Lavric	Romania	2:00.06	
2nd place, silver medalist(s)	Merve Aydın	Turkey	2:00.92	
3rd place, bronze medalist(s)	Machteld Mulder	Netherlands	2:02.05	
4	Alison Leonard	United Kingdom	2:02.15	
5	Winny Chebet	Kenya	2:04.13	
6	Sofia Öberg	Sweden	2:05.07	
7	Trychelle Kingdom	Australia	2:06.84	
8	Amina Bakhit	Sudan	2:10.71	

=== Semifinals ===
9 July

==== Semifinal 1 ====
Rank	Name	Nationality	Time	Notes
1	Merve Aydın	Turkey	2:06.94	Q
2	Machteld Mulder	Netherlands	2:07.91	Q
3	Stefanie Barmet	Switzerland	2:08.70	
4	Angie Smit	New Zealand	2:08.73	
5	Grace Mbuthye Kimanzi	Kenya	2:08.83	
6	Lynsey Sharp	United Kingdom	2:09.00	
7	Yekaterina Zavyalova	Russia	2:10.07	
8	Natalija Piliušina	Lithuania	2:10.90	

==== Semifinal 2 ====
Rank	Name	Nationality	Time	Notes
1	Elena Mirela Lavric	Romania	2:05.10	Q
2	Trychelle Kingdom	Australia	2:05.66	Q
3	Tintu Luka	India	2:06.51	
4	Jessica Parry	Canada	2:06.72	
5	Juana Méndez	Cuba	2:06.91	
6	Jessica Zeidler	Germany	2:07.43	
7	Khadija Afrayat	Morocco	2:11.46	
8	Djeneba Camara	France	2:15.26	

==== Semifinal 3 ====
Rank	Name	Nationality	Time	Notes
1	Alison Leonard	United Kingdom	2:04.07	Q
2	Winny Chebet	Kenya	2:04.42	Q
3	Amina Bakhit	Sudan	2:05.06	q
4	Sofia Öberg	Sweden	2:05.43	q
5	Volha Rulevich	Belarus	2:05.65	
6	Anne Kesselring	Germany	2:06.66	
7	Bindu Simon Rajam	India	2:10.28	
8	Katarina Zarudnaya	Russia	2:10.69	

=== Heats ===
8 July

==== Heat 1 ====
Rank	Name	Nationality	Time	Notes
1	Elena Mirela Lavric	Romania	2:09.68	Q
2	Winny Chebet	Kenya	2:09.92	Q
3	Stefanie Barmet	Switzerland	2:10.06	Q
4	Natalija Piliušina	Lithuania	2:10.39	Q
5	Eléni Theodorakopou	Greece	2:10.79	
6	Olga Bibik	Ukraine	2:10.80	
7	Jessica Smith	Canada	2:11.26	
8	Meliha Erdogan	Turkey	2:15.27	
9	Kim Baglietto	Gibraltar	2:21.07	

==== Heat 2 ====
Rank	Name	Nationality	Time	Notes
1	Amina Bakhit	Sudan	2:08.16	Q
2	Djeneba Camara	France	2:08.26	Q
3	Alison Leonard	United Kingdom	2:08.26	Q
4	Katarina Zarudnaya	Russia	2:08.27	Q
5	Anne Kesselring	Germany	2:08.33	q
6	Tintu Luka	India	2:09.20	q
7	Sianne Toemoe	Australia	2:09.48	
8	Ciara Everard	Ireland	2:09.85	
9	Camilla Dencer	United States	2:10.32	

==== Heat 3 ====
Rank	Name	Nationality	Time	Notes
1	Sofia Öberg	Sweden	2:08.16	Q
2	Machteld Mulder	Netherlands	2:09.10	Q
3	Khadija Afrayat	Morocco	2:09.34	Q
4	Bindu Simon Rajam	India	2:09.51	Q
5	Natoya Goule	Jamaica	2:09.55	
6	Medina Kadir	Ethiopia	2:10.15	
7	Heidi Pappila	Finland	2:11.23	
8	Alicja Benedyk	Poland	2:11.92	
	Rana Masood	Palestine	DNF	

==== Heat 4 ====
Rank	Name	Nationality	Time	Notes
1	Merve Aydın	Turkey	2:06.89	Q
2	Trychelle Kingdom	Australia	2:07.77	Q
3	Yekaterina Zavyalova	Russia	2:07.77	Q
4	Angie Smit	New Zealand	2:08.15	Q
5	Jessica Zeidler	Germany	2:08.83	q
6	Ruriko Kubo	Japan	2:09.70	
7	Caster Semenya	South Africa	2:11.98	
8	Sarah McCurdy	United States	2:12.67	
9	Ehssan Arbab	Sudan	2:13.22	

==== Heat 5 ====
Rank	Name	Nationality	Time	Notes
1	Jessica Parry	Canada	2:08.20	Q
2	Volha Rulevich	Belarus	2:08.49	Q
3	Juana Méndez	Cuba	2:08.60	Q
4	Lynsey Sharp	United Kingdom	2:08.80	Q
5	Grace Mbuthye Kimanzi	Kenya	2:09.23	q
6	Florina Pierdevara	Romania	2:09.55	
7	Sheto Wencha	Ethiopia	2:12.06	
8	Marina Puhach	Ukraine	2:12.44	
9	Magdalena Stankiewicz	Poland	2:15.02	

== Participation ==
According to an unofficial count, 45 athletes from 31 countries participated in the event.

- Australia (2)
- Belarus (1)
- Canada (2)
- Cuba (1)
- Ethiopia (2)
- Finland (1)
- France (1)
- Germany (2)
- Gibraltar (1)
- Greece (1)
- India (2)
- Ireland (1)
- Jamaica (1)
- Japan (1)
- Kenya (2)
- Lithuania (1)
- Morocco (1)
- Netherlands (1)
- New Zealand (1)
- Palestine (1)
- Poland (2)
- Romania (2)
- Russia (2)
- South Africa (1)
- Sudan (2)
- Sweden (1)
- Switzerland (1)
- Turkey (2)
- Ukraine (2)
- United Kingdom (2)
- United States (2)
