= Lithuania at the 2013 Summer Universiade =

- IOC code: LTU

in Kazan
- Competitors: 91 in 12 sports
- Medals Ranked 11thth: Gold 6 Silver 1 Bronze 3 Total 10

Summer Universiade appearances
- 1959; 1961; 1963; 1965; 1967; 1970; 1973; 1975; 1977; 1979; 1981; 1983; 1985; 1987; 1989; 1991; 1993; 1995; 1997; 1999; 2001; 2003; 2005; 2007; 2009; 2011; 2013; 2015; 2017; 2019; 2021; 2025; 2027

Lithuania competed at the 2013 Summer Universiade in Kazan, Russia from 6 to 17 July 2013.

== Medalists ==
| Medal | Name | Sport | Event |
|---|---|---|---|
| Gold | Milda Valčiukaitė; Donata Vištartaitė | Rowing | Women's double sculls |
| Gold | Saulius Ritter; Rolandas Maščinskas | Rowing | Men's double sculls |
| Gold | Mindaugas Griškonis | Rowing | Men's single sculls |
| Gold | Jevgenijus Šuklinas | Canoeing | Men's C1 200 metres |
| Gold | Jevgenijus Šuklinas | Canoeing | Men's C1 500 metres |
| Gold | Ignas Navakauskas | Canoeing | Men's K1 200 metres |
| Silver | Lina Grinčikaitė | Athletics | Women's 100 metres |
| Bronze | Eglė Balčiūnaitė | Athletics | Women's 800 metres |
| Bronze | Tadas Tamašauskas | Boxing | Heavyweight |
| Bronze | Žilvinas Zabarskas | Sambo | Men's +100 kg |

=== Medals by sport ===
| Sport | Gold | Silver | Bronze | Total |
|---|---|---|---|---|
| Canoeing | 3 | 0 | 0 | 3 |
| Rowing | 3 | 0 | 0 | 3 |
| Athletics | 0 | 1 | 1 | 2 |
| Boxing | 0 | 0 | 1 | 1 |
| Sambo | 0 | 0 | 1 | 1 |
| Totals (5 entries) | 6 | 1 | 3 | 10 |

== Athletics ==
Men
Track & road events

| Athlete | Event | Heat | | Quarterfinal | | Semifinal | | Final | |
| Athlete | Event | Result | Rank | Result | Rank | Result | Rank | Result | Rank |
|---|---|---|---|---|---|---|---|---|---|
| Rytis Sakalauskas | 100 m | 10.49 | 2nd Q | 10.30 | 2nd Q | 10.37 | 3rd Q | 10.30 | 7th |
| Taufiq Saleem | 200 m | 22.05 | 5th | Did not advance | | | | | |
| Egidijus Dilys | 200 m | 21.37 | 2nd Q | 21.32 | 4th | Did not advance | | | |
| Vitalij Kozlov | 800 m | 1:54.80 | 3rd Q | —N/a | | 1:53.48 | 8th | Did not advance | |
| Justinas Beržanskis | 3000 m steeplechase | 8:49.87 | 5th q | —N/a | | | | 8:54.72 | 8th |
| Tomas Gaidamavičius | 20 km walk | —N/a | | | | | | - | DSQ |
| Ričardas Rekst | 20 km walk | —N/a | | | | | | 1:32:45 | 24th |

- Lithuania was registered to compete in 4x100 m relay but did not start.

Field events

| Athlete | Event | Qualification | | Final | |
| Athlete | Event | Distance | Position | Distance | Position |
|---|---|---|---|---|---|
| Raivydas Stanys | High jump | 2.20 | 8th q | 2.20 | 7th |
| Ernestas Raudys | High jump | 2.05 | 26th | Did not advance | |
| Darius Aučyna | Long jump | 7.78 | q | 7.49 | 10th |
| Marius Vadeikis | Long jump | 7.60 | q | 7.44 | 11th |
| Šarūnas Banevičius | Shot put | 18.99 | 5th q | 19.22 | 7th |
| Rimantas Martišauskas | Shot put | 17.57 | 14th | Did not advance | |

Women
Track & road events

| Athlete | Event | Heat | | Semifinal | | Final | |
| Athlete | Event | Result | Rank | Result | Rank | Result | Rank |
|---|---|---|---|---|---|---|---|
| Lina Grinčikaitė | 100 m | 11.52 | 1st Q | 11.43 Q | 1st Q | 11.32 | Silver |
| Eglė Balčiūnaitė | 800 m | 2:08.36 | 2nd Q | 2:01.33 | 2nd Q | 1:59.82 | Bronze |
| Natalija Piliušina | 800 m | 2:06.91 | 3rd Q | 2:01.59 | 5th q | 2:04.62 | 8th |
| Sonata Tamošaitytė | 100 m hurdles | 13.41 | 3rd q | —N/a | | 13.35 | 8th |
| Eglė Staišiūnaitė | 400 m hurdles | 59.99 | 4th | Did not advance | | | |
| Vaida Žūsinaitė | 3000 m steeplechase | —N/a | | | | 10:04.37 | 8th |

- Lithuania was registered to compete in 4x100 m relay but did not start.

Field events

| Athlete | Event | Qualification | | Final | |
| Athlete | Event | Distance | Position | Distance | Position |
|---|---|---|---|---|---|
| Lina Andrijauskaitė | Long jump | 6.02 | 16th | Did not advance | |
| Ieva Ščiukauskaitė | Javelin throw | —N/a | | 43.98 | 8th |

== Basketball ==
=== Men's tournament ===
| Team | Pld | W | L | PF | PA | PD | Pts |
|---|---|---|---|---|---|---|---|
| Lithuania | 0 | 0 | 0 | 0 | 0 | 0 | 0 |
| Finland | 0 | 0 | 0 | 0 | 0 | 0 | 0 |
| Brazil | 0 | 0 | 0 | 0 | 0 | 0 | 0 |
| China | 0 | 0 | 0 | 0 | 0 | 0 | 0 |
| Chile | 0 | 0 | 0 | 0 | 0 | 0 | 0 |
| Norway | 0 | 0 | 0 | 0 | 0 | 0 | 0 |

7 July 2013
18:00

| Lithuania | vs. | Norway |

Miras Sports Complex

8 July 2013
18:00

| Lithuania | vs. | Chile |

Miras Sports Complex

10 July 2013
18:00

| Lithuania | vs. | China |

Basket Hall

11 July 2013
12:30

| Lithuania | vs. | Brazil |

Miras Sports Complex

12 July 2013
10:00

| Lithuania | vs. | Finland |

Miras Sports Complex

== Belt wrestling ==
Women

- Indrė Bubelytė (58 kg.)
- Giedrė Blekaitytė (66 kg.)

Men

- Povilas Žukauskas (68 kg.)
- Justinas Gramba (70 kg.)
- Domas Zimkus (80 kg.)
- M. Labalaukis (+90 kg.)
- Zigmas Pečiulis (+100 kg.)

== Boxing ==
Men

| Athlete | Event | Qualification | Round of 16 | Quarterfinals | Semifinals | Final | |
| Athlete | Event | Opposition Result | Opposition Result | Opposition Result | Opposition Result | Opposition Result | Rank |
|---|---|---|---|---|---|---|---|
| Ričardas Kuncaitis | +69 kg | BYE | Piraki (TJK); L TKO | Did not advance | | | |
| Paulius Petronis | +75 kg | Ahmadov (AZE); W 2–1 | Nazarov (TJK); L 0-3 | Did not advance | | | |
| Tadas Tamašauskas | +91 kg | BYE | Kang (KOR); W 3–0 | Soggia (ITA); W 3–0 | Tishchenko (RUS); L 0-3 | Did not advance | Bronze |

== Canoeing ==
- Jevgenij Shuklin
- Mindaugas Maldonis
- Ignas Navakauskas
- Ričardas Nekriošius
- Andrej Olijnik
- Laimonas Smulkys
- Dovilė Sudeikytė
- Vytautas Vasiliauskas

== Judo ==
- Karolis Bauža
- Gintarė Klišytė
- Marius Labalaukis
- Santa Pakenytė
- Vytautas Skilinskas
- Žilvinas Zabarauskas

== Rowing ==
| Athlete | Event | Heats | | Repechage | | Semifinals | | Finals | |
| Athlete | Event | Time | Rank | Time | Rank | Time | Rank | Time | Rank |
|---|---|---|---|---|---|---|---|---|---|
| Mindaugas Griškonis | M1x | 7:15.40 | 1 SA/B | BYE | | 7:03.50 | 1 FA | 7:18.32 | Gold |
| Saulius Ritter; Rolandas Maščinskas | M2x | 6:34.57 | 1 SA/B | BYE | | 6:23.50 | 1 FA | 6:36.76 | Gold |
| Dovydas Balsys; Rokas Balsys; Žygimantas Galinšanskis; Marius Ralickas | M4- | 6:51.79 | 2 R | 7:09.72 | 2 F | —N/a | | 6:38.93 | 4th |
| Ieva Adomavičiūtė | W1x | 8:20.47 | 4 R | 9:20.24 | 3 FB | —N/a | | 8:19.40 (1) | 7th |
| Donata Vištartaitė; Milda Valčiukaitė | W2x | 7:13.58 | 1 SA/B | BYE | | 7:13.71 | 1 FA | 7:17.43 | Gold |

Qualification Legend: FA=Final A (medal); FB=Final B (non-medal); SA/B=Semifinals A/B; R=Repechage

== Sambo ==
- Karina Bičkutė
- Gintarė Klišytė
- Marius Labalaukis
- Radvilas Matukas
- Vytautas Skilinskas
- Aurelija Šukytė
- Žilvinas Zabarauskas

== Shooting ==
| Athlete | Event | Qualification | | Final | |
| Athlete | Event | Points | Rank | Points | Rank |
|---|---|---|---|---|---|
| Karolis Girulis | Men's 10 metre air rifle | 626.5 | 4th | 121.5 | 6th |
| Karolis Girulis | Men's 50 metre rifle prone | 593.9 | 55th | Did not advance | |
| Karolis Girulis | Men's 50 metre rifle 3 positions | 1130 | 38th | Did not advance | |
| Donatas Blaškevičius | Men's Trap | 108 | 20th | Did not advance | |
| Jekaterina Ždanova | Women's 10 metre air pistol | 370 | 37th | Did not advance | |
| Jekaterina Ždanova | Women's 50 metre pistol | 278 | 23rf | Did not advance | |

== Swimming ==
- Matas Andriekus
- Simonas Bilis
- Vaidotas Blažys
- Igor Kozlovskij
- Ramūnas Paknys
- Mindaugas Sadauskas
- Giedrius Titenis

== Weightlifting ==
| Athlete | Event | Snatch | | Clean & jerk | | Total | Rank |
| Athlete | Event | Result | Rank | Result | Rank | Total | Rank |
|---|---|---|---|---|---|---|---|
| Mantas Vitkauskas | Men's −69 kg | 112 | 15 | 134 | 15 | 246 | 14th |
| Tomas Li-Cin-Chai | Men's −85 kg | 124 | 15 | 160 | 13 | 284 | 13th |
| Marius Mickevičius | Men's −85 kg | 152 | 6 | 183 | 9 | 335 | 8th |
| Žygimantas Stanulis | Men's −94 kg | 171 | 2 | 201 | 5th | 372 | 4th |
| Sergej Lichovoj | Men's −105 kg | 150 | 15 | 187 | 14 | 337 | 14th |
| Aleksandra Stepanova | Women's −48 kg | 64 | 9 | 78 | 10 | 142 | 9th |

== Wrestling ==
- Giedrė Blekaitytė
- Indrė Bubelytė
- Marijus Grygelis
- Šarūnas Jurčys
- Vilius Laurinaitis
- Julius Matuzevičius
- Jonas Rudavičius
