= 2012 IAAF World Indoor Championships – Women's 800 metres =

The women's 800 metres at the 2012 IAAF World Indoor Championships will be held at the Ataköy Athletics Arena on 9 and 11 March.

== Medalists ==
Gold	Silver	Bronze
Pamela Jelimo; Kenya	Nataliia Lupu; Ukraine	Erica Moore; United States

== Records ==
Standing records prior to the 2012 IAAF World Indoor Championships
World record	Jolanda Čeplak (SLO)	1:55.82	Vienna, Austria	3 March 2002
Championship record	Ludmila Formanová (CZE)	1:56.90	Maebashi, Japan	7 March 1999
World Leading	Malika Akkaoui (MAR)	1:59.01	Liévin, France	14 February 2012
African record	Maria Mutola (MOZ)	1:57.06	Liévin, France	21 February 1999
Asian record	Miho Sugimori (JPN)	2:00.78	Yokohama, Japan	22 February 2003
European record	Jolanda Čeplak (SLO)	1:55.82	Vienna, Austria	3 March 2002
North and Central American and Caribbean record	Nicole Teter (USA)	1:58.71	New York City, United States	2 March 2002
Oceanian Record	Toni Hodgkinson (NZL)	2:00.36	Paris, France	9 March 1997
South American record	Letitia Vriesde (SUR)	1:59.21	Birmingham, Great Britain	23 February 1997

== Qualification standards ==
Indoor	Outdoor
2:03.50	1:59.50

== Schedule ==
Date	Time	Round
March 9, 2012	11:50	Heats
March 11, 2012	15:35	Final

== Results ==
=== Heats ===
Qualification: 1st of each heat (Q) plus 3 fastest times (q) qualified.

Rank	Heat	Name	Nationality	Time	Notes
1	3	Elena Kofanova	Russia	1:59.80	Q
2	3	Erica Moore	United States	2:00.24	q, PB
DQ	1	Yuliya Rusanova	Russia	~~2:00.26~~	Q, ~~SB~~, Doping
4	1	Pamela Jelimo	Kenya	2:00.32	q
5	1	Nataliia Lupu	Ukraine	2:01.17	q, PB
6	3	Merve Aydın	Turkey	2:01.19	NR
7	2	Fantu Magiso	Ethiopia	2:01.69	Q, PB
8	2	Maryna Arzamasava	Belarus	2:02.05	
9	3	Eléni Filándra	Greece	2:02.67	
10	1	Lenka Masná	Czech Republic	2:03.08	
11	1	Phoebe Wright	United States	2:03.11	
12	2	Carolin Walter	Germany	2:03.61	
13	2	Marilyn Okoro	Great Britain	2:04.06	
14	2	Malika Akkaoui	Morocco	2:04.20	
15	3	Elena Popescu	Moldova	2:05.24	PB
16	2	Rabia Ashiq	Pakistan	2:27.03	PB
17	1	Woroud Sawalha	Palestine	2:51.87	PB
	3	Elisa Cusma Piccione	Italy	DNF	

=== Final ===
The final started at 15:35.

Rank	Name	Nationality	Time	Notes
1st place, gold medalist(s)	Pamela Jelimo	Kenya	1:58.83	WL, NR
2nd place, silver medalist(s)	Nataliia Lupu	Ukraine	1:59.67	PB
3rd place, bronze medalist(s)	Erica Moore	United States	1:59.97	PB
4	Fantu Magiso	Ethiopia	2:00.30	PB
5	Elena Kofanova	Russia	2:00.67	
DQ	Yuliya Rusanova	Russia	~~2:01.87~~	Doping
