= Athletics at the 2015 Summer Universiade – Women's 800 metres =

The women's 800 metres event at the 2015 Summer Universiade was held on 8, 9 and 10 July at the Gwangju Universiade Main Stadium.

== Medalists ==
Gold	Silver	Bronze
Angie Petty; New Zealand	Simoya Campbell; Jamaica	Fabienne Kohlmann; Germany

== Results ==
=== Heats ===
Qualification: First 3 in each heat (Q) and next 4 fastest (q) qualified for the semifinals.

Rank	Heat	Name	Nationality	Time	Notes
1	4	Angie Petty	New Zealand	2:03.85	Q
2	3	Natalia Evangelidou	Cyprus	2:04.18	Q
3	2	Fabienne Kohlmann	Germany	2:04.34	Q
4	3	Simoya Campbell	Jamaica	2:04.52	Q
5	3	Paulina Mikiewicz	Poland	2:04.60	Q
6	4	Docus Ajok	Uganda	2:04.70	Q, SB
7	3	Katherine Camp	New Zealand	2:04.74	q, SB
8	2	Mariya Nikolayeva	Russia	2:04.98	Q
9	4	Lindsey Butterworth	Canada	2:05.05	Q
10	1	Eglė Balčiūnaitė	Lithuania	2:05.12	Q
10	2	Natalja Piliušina	Lithuania	2:05.12	Q
12	4	Nataliya Grigoryeva	Russia	2:05.34	q
13	1	Ciara Everard	Ireland	2:05.36	Q
14	1	Anuscha Nice	South Africa	2:05.47	Q
15	2	Alissa Martinez	United States	2:05.34	q
16	1	Rachel Aubry	Canada	2:06.67	q
17	4	Suzanne Voorrips	Netherlands	2:07.57	
18	1	Susan Aneno	Uganda	2:09.28	
19	3	Kimberly Mackay	United States	2:10.70	
20	1	Mateja Pokrivač	Slovenia	2:11.38	PB
21	2	Zhang Gui	China	2:11.68	
22	3	Kelly Nevolihhin	Estonia	2:11.87	SB
23	4	Christina Toogood	Norway	2:13.17	
24	2	Martine Borge	Norway	2:14.06	
25	3	María Luisa Garrido	Venezuela	2:15.44	
26	4	Dorotea Rebernik	Slovenia	2:15.85	
27	2	Sebenzile Simelane	Swaziland	2:50.80	
28	2	Madina Andjayi Keita	Gabon	2:53.36	
	1	Memory Remadji Mbaiba	Chad	DNS	

=== Semifinals ===
Qualification: First 3 in each heat (Q) and the next 2 fastest (q) qualified for the final.

Rank	Heat	Name	Nationality	Time	Notes
1	2	Angie Petty	New Zealand	2:00.74	Q
2	2	Eglė Balčiūnaitė	Lithuania	2:01.63	Q, SB
3	2	Rachel Aubry	Canada	2:01.98	Q, PB
4	2	Ciara Everard	Ireland	2:02.10	q
5	1	Fabienne Kohlmann	Germany	2:02.99	Q
6	1	Simoya Campbell	Jamaica	2:03.10	Q
7	1	Mariya Nikolayeva	Russia	2:03.29	Q, PB
8	2	Lindsey Butterworth	Canada	2:03.38	q
9	2	Nataliya Grigoryeva	Russia	2:03.41	
10	1	Natalia Evangelidou	Cyprus	2:03.62	
11	1	Anuscha Nice	South Africa	2:03.65	PB
12	1	Natalja Piliušina	Lithuania	2:04.84	
13	1	Paulina Mikiewicz	Poland	2:04.97	
14	2	Katherine Camp	New Zealand	2:05.00	
15	1	Alissa Martinez	United States	2:07.31	
	2	Docus Ajok	Uganda	DQ	R163.3

=== Final ===
Official Video

Rank	Name	Nationality	Time	Notes
1st place, gold medalist(s)	Angie Petty	New Zealand	1:59.06	PB
2nd place, silver medalist(s)	Simoya Campbell	Jamaica	1:59.26	PB
3rd place, bronze medalist(s)	Fabienne Kohlmann	Germany	1:59.54	PB
4	Eglė Balčiūnaitė	Lithuania	2:00.21	SB
5	Rachel Aubry	Canada	2:02.17	
6	Ciara Everard	Ireland	2:02.46	
7	Lindsey Butterworth	Canada	2:03.96	
8	Mariya Nikolayeva	Russia	2:04.05	
