= Olga Cristea =

Moldovan runner (born 1987)

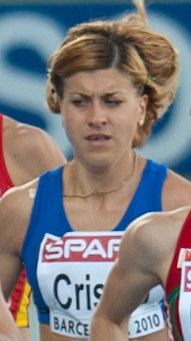
- Cristea in 2010

Personal information
- Born: December 13, 1987 (age 38) Chișinău, Moldova

Sport
- Event: 800 metres

Olga Cristea (born 13 December 1987) is a Moldovan runner who specializes in the 800 metres. Her personal best time is 2:00.12 minutes, achieved at the 2008 Olympic Games in Beijing.

She was born in Chişinău. She won the silver medal at the 2003 World Youth Championships and the gold medal at the 2006 World Junior Championships. She also competed at the Olympic Games in 2004 and 2008, but without reaching the final.

She received a two-year ban from the sport in July 2010 after testing positive for abnormal levels of testosterone.

== Achievements ==
Year	Competition	Venue	Position	Event	Notes
Representing Moldova
2006	World Junior Championships	Beijing, China	1st	800m	2:04.52
2009	World Student Games	Belgrade, Serbia	2nd	800 m	2:03.49
2009	European U23 Championships	Kaunas, Lithuania	8th	800m	2:04.36

== See also ==
- List of doping cases in athletics
