= Valentin Betoudji =

Chadian long-distance runner

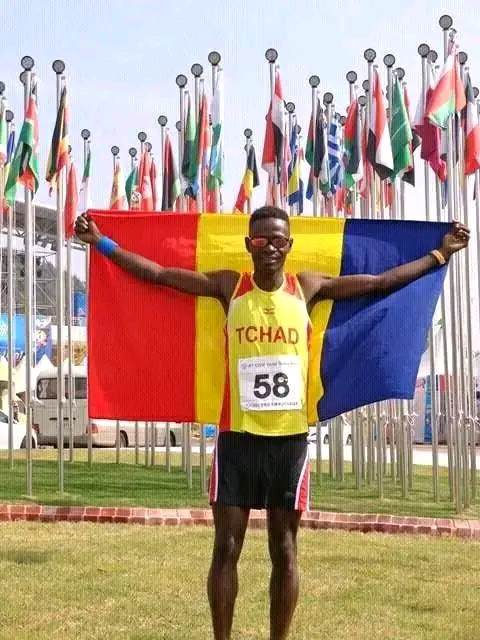
- Betoudji in 2024

Personal information
- Born: 14 February 1991 (age 35)

Sport
- Country: Chad
- Sport: Long-distance running

Valentin Betoudji (born 14 February 1991) is a Chadian long-distance runner.

He competed in the men's 5000 metres and men's 10,000 metres events at the 2015 Military World Games held in Mungyeong, South Korea.

In 2018, he competed in the men's half marathon at the 2018 IAAF World Half Marathon Championships held in Valencia, Spain. He finished in 128th place. In the same year, he also competed in the men's 5000 metres event at the 2018 African Championships in Athletics held in Asaba, Nigeria.

In 2019, he finished in 17th place in the men's half marathon at the 2019 African Games held in Rabat, Morocco with a time of 1:10:44. In 2020, he competed in the men's race at the 2020 World Athletics Half Marathon Championships held in Gdynia, Poland.
