= Erica Moore =

American middle-distance runner (born 1988)

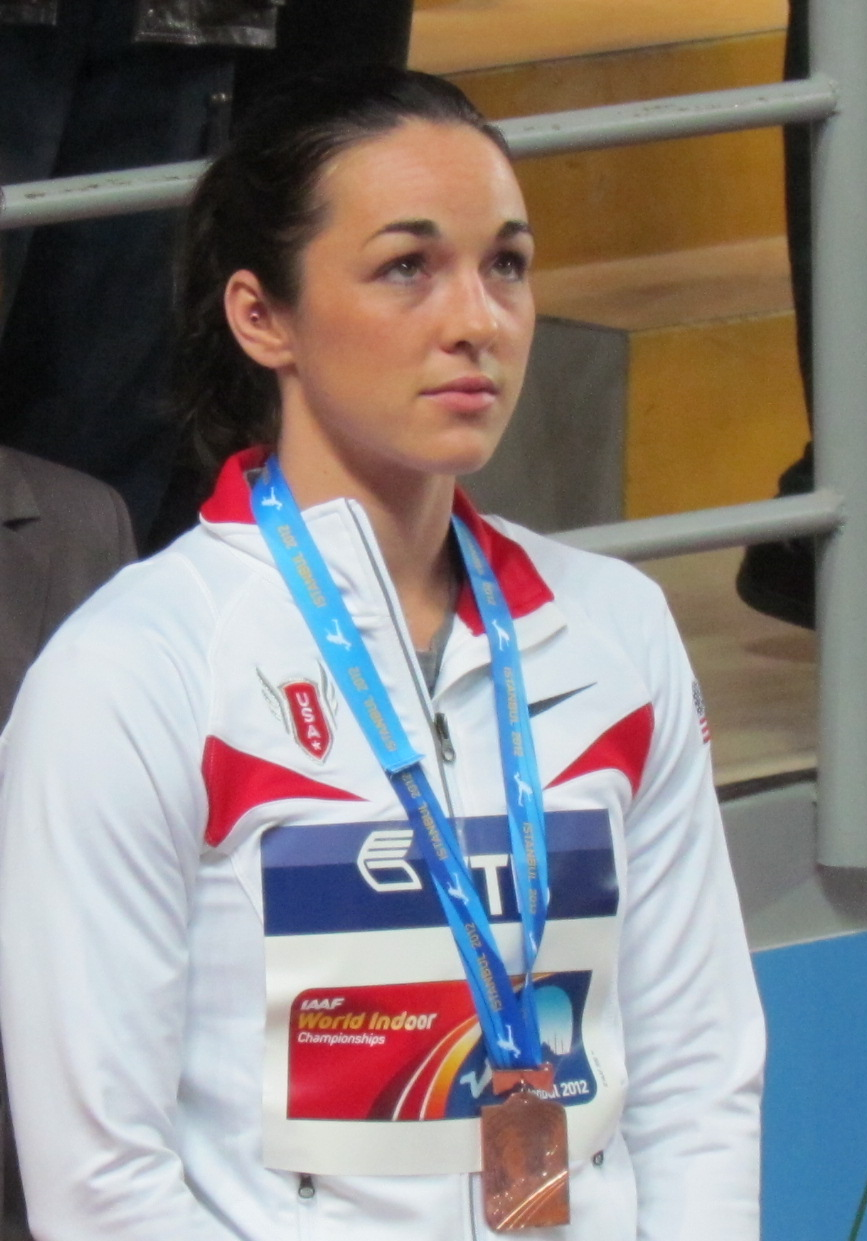

Personal information
- Nationality: American
- Born: March 25, 1988 (age 38) Seymour, Indiana, United States

Sport
- Country: United States
- Sport: Track and field
- Event: Middle distance running

Erica Moore (born March 25, 1988, in Seymour, Indiana) is an American middle-distance runner. She attended and graduated from Sullivan High School in Sullivan, Indiana, where her father was the boys basketball coach. She was a versatile athlete, establishing school records in at least six events in track and playing basketball.

She qualified for the Indiana state finals in three events and finished third in the 300-meter hurdles. She then won the 300-meter hurdles in the Midwest Meet of Champions.

== NCAA ==
She matriculated to Indiana State University in Terre Haute, Indiana, where she had an outstanding career in track, competing primarily in the pentathlon and heptathlon and middle distance events, including the 400 meter-run, 800-meter run and 400-meter hurdles. As a senior in 2010 she was an All-America in the 800-meter run indoors and the 400-meter hurdles outdoors.

She was induced in the Hall of Fame member in 2019.

== Nike ==
Erica won 2012 USA Indoor Championships in 2:01.08 running from the front wire-to-wire. She got bronze medal at 800 metres event at 2012 IAAF World Indoor Championships in Istanbul, Turkey. Moore personal best at 800 m is 1:59.97 (2012).

== Achievements ==
Year	Competition	Venue	Position	Event	Notes
Representing United States
2012	World Indoor Championships	Istanbul, Turkey	3rd	800 m	1:59.97
