= Gabriela DeBues-Stafford =

Canadian middle-distance runner

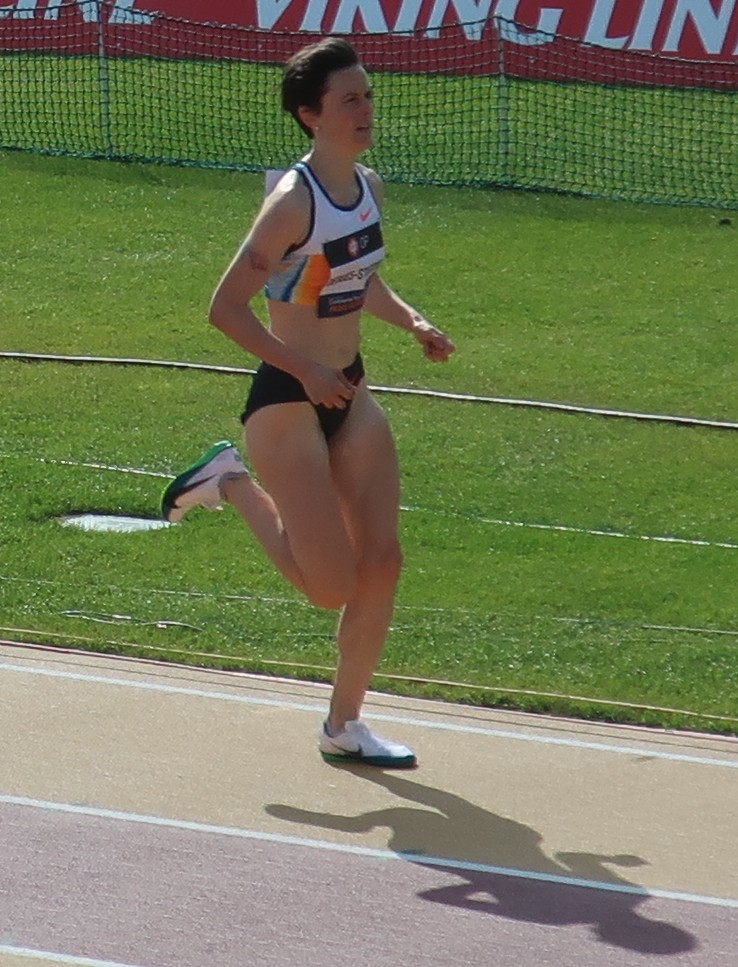
- De-Bues Stafford in 2025

Personal information
- Born: 13 September 1995 (age 31) London, Ontario, Canada
- Education: University of Toronto
- Employer: Nike
- Height: 1.63 m (5 ft 4 in)
- Spouse: Rowan DeBues-Stafford (m. 2019)

Sport
- Country: Canada
- Sport: Athletics/track
- Events: Middle-, Long-distance running
- University team: Varsity Blues
- Coached by: Rowan DeBues-Stafford

Achievements and titles
- Personal bests: Outdoor; 800 m: 1:58.70 (Portland 2021); 1500 m: 3:56.12 NR (Doha 2019); Mile: 4:17.87 NR (Monaco 2019); 5000 m: 14:44.12 NR (Brussels 2019); Indoor; 800 m: 2:00.96i (Glasgow 2020); 1500 m: 4:00.80i+ NR (New York 2020); Mile: 4:19.73i NR (New York 2020); 3000 m: 8:33.92i NR (New York 2022); 5000 m: 14:31.38i AR (Boston 2022)
Medal record
Athletics
Representing Canada
NACAC Championships
Bronze medal – third place	2018 Toronto	1500 m
Summer Universiade
Silver medal – second place	2015 Gwangju	1500 m
- Updated on 6 February 2022

Gabriela Maria DeBues-Stafford (née Stafford, born 13 September 1995) is a Canadian middle- and long-distance runner. A two-time Olympian, she placed fifth in the women's 1500 metres at the 2020 Tokyo Olympics. DeBues-Stafford holds the NACAC area record over the indoor 5000 metres, which she set in February 2022.

She holds six Canadian national outdoor and indoor records over distances from the 1500 to 5000 metres. In addition, she won a silver medal at the 2015 Summer Universiade.

== Career ==
=== Early career ===
DeBues-Stafford was born in London, Ontario and grew up in Toronto. Her father James Stafford was a former competitive runner and represented Canada at four World Cross Country Championships. She and her younger sister Lucia initially trained in competitive Irish dancing, but DeBues-Stafford switched to running, subsequently joined by Lucia to spend more time with her father and sister. Both sisters were diagnosed with Graves' disease as teenagers, though DeBues-Stafford's case would prove more manageable than Lucia's in the years ahead, hindering the latter's athletics career.

In Grade 12, DeBues-Stafford won the Ontario Federation of School Athletic Associations' cross country running championship. She was subsequently accepted to study psychology at the University of Toronto's Victoria College, during which time she competed for the Varsity Blues athletics squad. Appearing at a senior international championship for the first time, DeBues-Stafford won the silver medal in the women's 1500 m event at the 2015 Summer Universiade in Gwangju.

=== 2016–21 ===
DeBues-Stafford competing in the women's 1500 m at the 2016 World Indoor Championships in Portland, finishing twelfth in the heats and thus not advancing to the event final. In July 2016, she was officially named to Canada's Olympic team for the 2016 Summer Olympics in Rio de Janeiro. She placed ninth in her heat of the women's 1500 m event, and twenty-fifth overall, and thus did not advance to the semi-final phase of the competition.

The following year, she made her World Athletics Championships debut at the 2017 World Championships in Athletics, where she placed twenty-first in the semi-finals of the 1500 m and did not advance.

In a series of championships appearances in 2018, DeBues-Stafford competed for Canada at the World Indoor Championships and the 2018 Commonwealth Games, in neither case advancing past the heats. At the 2018 NACAC Championships in Toronto she won the bronze medal with a time of 4:07.36. While competing at the British Grand Prix on the 2018 Diamond League, she met coach Andy Young and, following discussions, agreed to move to train in Glasgow, where Young's other students included Laura Muir.

DeBues-Stafford enjoyed a strong 2019, breaking the national records for the indoor mile and 5,000 metres and the outdoor 1,500 metre, mile and 5,000 metre records. She would go on to add the indoor 1,500 metre record in 2020. Making her second Worlds appearance at the 2019 World Athletics Championships in Doha, she advanced to the final in the women's 1500 m event and placed sixth with a time of 3:56.12. In doing so, she achieved her previously stated goal of running in the final in a time under four minutes. She remarked afterward that "I really believed I had a chance at a medal, even 200 meters from the finish," but that "once I was into the homestretch, I knew I didn't have it." Following this, she moved to train at Portland's Bowerman Track Club under Shalane Flanagan.

With the COVID-19 pandemic delaying the 2020 Summer Olympics by a year, DeBues-Stafford continued to train with a focus on strength and endurance work. As the 2021 season started, she broke the 1 minute 59 seconds barrier at the Portland Track Festival's 800 metres event, becoming one of only three women in the world who have run under 1:59 in the 800 metres, 3:57 in the 1500 metres, and 14:45 in the 5000 metres. She was again named to the Canadian Olympic team, this time alongside her sister Lucia. Both competed in the women's 1500 m event in Tokyo, with Gabriela advancing to the event final while Lucia finished thirteenth in the semi-finals, narrowly missing being amongst the final twelve. Gabriela placed fifth in the Olympic final.

=== 2022–present ===
On 11 February 2022, at the David Hemery Valentine Invitational in Boston, DeBues-Stafford broke the North, Central American and Caribbean record in the indoor 5000 metres with a time of 14m 31.38s, improving the mark set by USA's Shalane Flanagan in 2009 by more than 15 seconds. In her first championship appearance of the year at the 2022 World Indoor Championships in Belgrade, she finished fourth in the 3000 m, narrowly missing the podium.

In April 2022, DeBues-Stafford announced that she was relocating from Portland to Victoria, citing the ongoing doping controversy around former training partner Shelby Houlihan as having been detrimental to her preparations for the Tokyo Olympics. Due to developing a stress reaction in her sacrum, she was forced to end her season prematurely, foregoing both the 2022 Commonwealth Games and the 2022 World Athletics Championships. Her recovery continued through the 2023 athletics season. She returned to the World Athletics Championships in 2025 in Tokyo, Japan, finishing 11th place in the 1500 m with a time of 3:59.65. She won the 1500 m at the Paavo Nurmi Games in 2025, with a time of 4:02, and 2026, with a time of 4:04.40.

== Personal life ==
The daughter of James Stafford and Maria Luisa Gardner, DeBues-Stafford has a younger brother, Nicholas, and a sister Lucia. Her mother died due to leukemia when she was 13. Both Gabriela and Lucia are trilingual, speaking English, French and Spanish.

DeBues-Stafford is bisexual. She dyed her hair in rainbow colours for the 2021 athletic season due to their association with the LGBT community. She met her husband, Rowan DeBues while moving into her dormitory at the University of Toronto. They married in 2019, each taking on hyphenate surnames.

== Competition record ==
Representing Canada
Year	Competition	Venue	Position	Event	Notes
2013	Pan American Junior Championships	Medellín, Colombia	8th	1500 m	4:53.35
2014	World Junior Championships	Eugene, United States	9th	3000 m	9:14.97
2015	Universiade	Gwangju, South Korea	2nd	1500 m	4:19.27
2016	World Indoor Championships	Portland, United States	12th (h)	1500 m	4:11.46
2016	Olympic Games	Rio de Janeiro, Brazil	25th (h)	1500 m	4:09.45
2017	World Championships	London, United Kingdom	21st (sf)	1500 m	4:08.51
2018	World Indoor Championships	Birmingham, United Kingdom	13th (h)	1500 m	4:09.94
2018	Commonwealth Games	Gold Coast, Australia	14th (h)	1500 m	4:09.59
2018	NACAC Championships	Toronto, Canada	3rd	1500 m	4:07.36
2019	World Championships	Doha, Qatar	6th	1500 m	3:56.12
2021	Olympic Games	Tokyo, Japan	5th	1500 m	3:58.93
2022	World Indoor Championships	Belgrade, Serbia	4th	3000 m	8:42.89
2025	World Championships	Tokyo, Japan	11th	1500 m	3:59.65
2026	Commonwealth Games	Glasgow, United Kingdom	14th	5000 m	15:09.66
2026	World Road Running Championships	Copenhagen, Denmark	9th	Road mile	4:30.59

== Personal bests ==
=== Outdoor ===
- 800 metres – 1:58.70 (Portland 2021)
- 1500 metres – 3:56.12 (Doha 2019) NR
- One mile – 4:17.87 (Monaco 2019) NR
- 3000 metres – 8:38.51 (Phoenix 2021)
- 5000 metres - 14:44.12 (Brussels 2019) NR

=== Indoor ===
- 1000 metres – 2:42.47 (Ottawa 2016)
- 1500 metres – 4:00.80 (New York 2020) NR
- One mile – 4:19.73 (Millrose Games 2020) NR
- 3000 metres – 8:33.92 (New York 2022) NR
- 5000 metres – 14:31.38 (Boston 2022) North, Central American and Caribbean record
