= Florina Pierdevară =

Romanian middle-distance runner

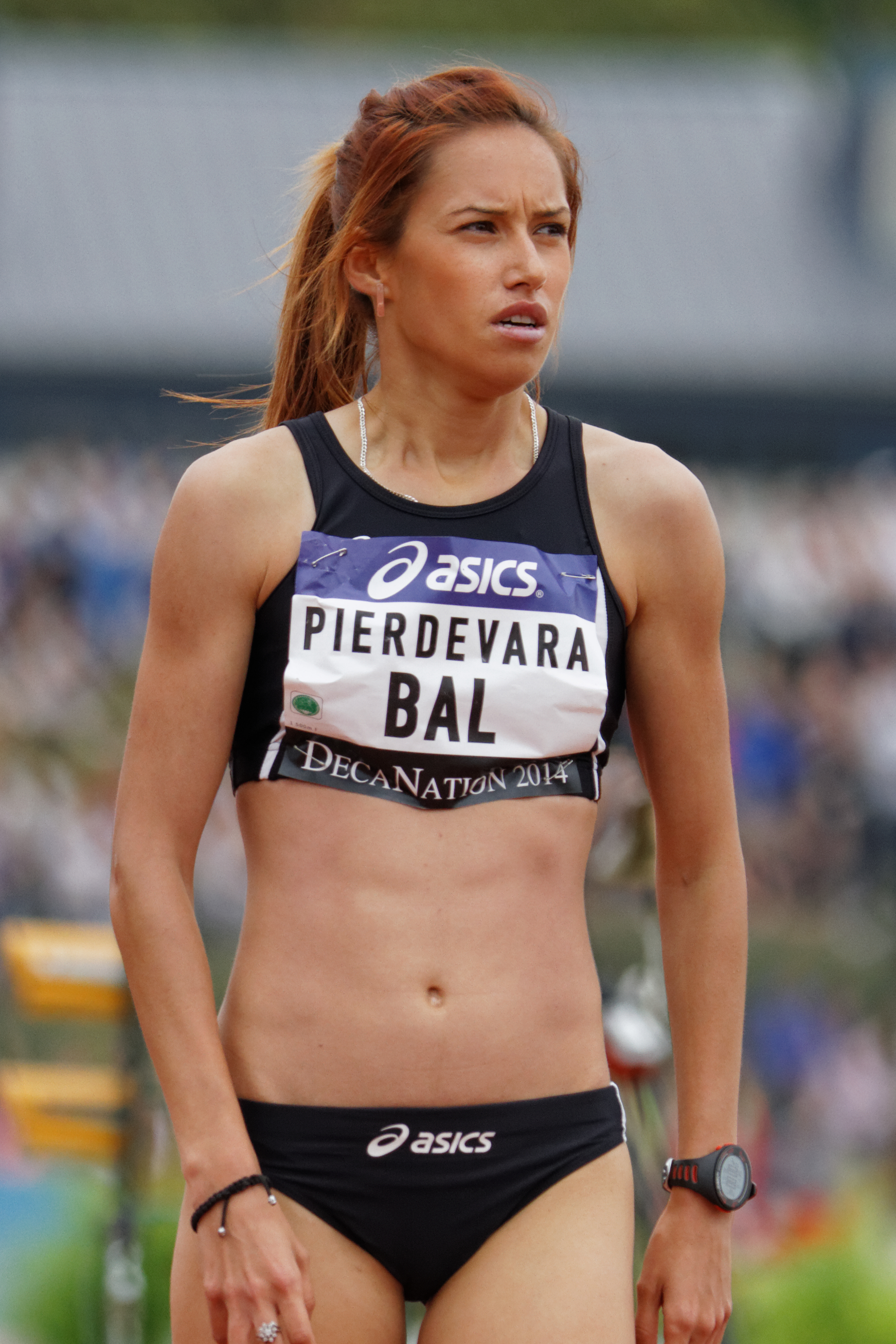
- Pierdevară at the 2014 DécaNation

Personal information
- Born: 29 March 1990 (age 36)

Sport
- Sport: Track and field
- Event: 1500 metres

Florina Pierdevara (born 29 March 1990) is a Romanian middle-distance runner. She competed in the 1500 metres at the 2015 World Championships in Beijing without advancing from the first round.

== International competitions ==
Year	Competition	Venue	Position	Event	Notes
Representing Romania
2007	World Youth Championships	Ostrava, Czech Republic	5th	800 m	2:06.60
2007	European Youth Olympic Festival	Belgrade, Serbia	1st	800 m	2:07.41
2008	World Junior Championships	Bydgoszcz, Poland	22nd (h)	800 m	2:09.55
2009	European Junior Championships	Novi Sad, Serbia	16th (h)	1500 m	4:26.16
2011	European U23 Championships	Ostrava, Czech Republic	18th (h)	1500 m	4:21.30
2013	Universiade	Kazan, Russia	9th (h)	1500 m	4:21.85
2014	IAAF World Relays	Nassau, Bahamas	7th	4 × 800 m relay	8:23.12
2014	IAAF World Relays	Nassau, Bahamas	7th	4 × 1500 m relay	8:23.12
2014	European Championships	Zürich, Switzerland	19th	800 m	2:03.99
2015	European Indoor Championships	Prague, Czech Republic	9th	1500 m	4:17.05
2015	World Championships	Beijing, China	30th (h)	1500 m	4:13.76
2015	Military World Games	Mungyeong, South Korea	4th	800 m	2:00.91
2015	Military World Games	Mungyeong, South Korea	3rd	1500 m	4:14.94
2016	European Championships	Amsterdam, Netherlands	16th (sf)	800 m	2:02.75
2016	European Championships	Amsterdam, Netherlands	9th (h)	1500 m	4:12.37
2016	Olympic Games	Rio de Janeiro, Brazil	50th (h)	800 m	2:03.32
2016	Olympic Games	Rio de Janeiro, Brazil	25th (h)	1500 m	4:11.55
2017	Jeux de la Francophonie	Abidjan, Ivory Coast	8th	800 m	2:05.48
2017	Jeux de la Francophonie	Abidjan, Ivory Coast	4th	1500 m	4:21.74

== Personal bests ==
Outdoor

- 800 metres – 2:00.91 (Mungyeong 2015)
- 1000 metres – 2:39.69 (Bucharest 2015)
- 1500 metres – 4:07.95 (Lignano Sabbiadoro 2015)

Indoor

- 800 metres – 2:04.12 (Bucharest 2015)
- 1500 metres – 4:16.01 (Istanbul 2015)
