= Athletics at the 2009 Summer Universiade – Women's 800 metres =

The women's 800 metres event at the 2009 Summer Universiade was held on 7–9 July.

== Medalists ==
Gold	Silver	Bronze
Madeleine Pape; Australia	Olga Cristea; Moldova	Rebecca Johnstone; Canada

== Results ==
=== Heats ===
Qualification: First 3 of each heat (Q) and the next 4 fastest (q) qualified for the semifinals.

Rank	Heat	Name	Nationality	Time	Notes
1	3	Rebecca Johnstone	Canada	2:05.85	Q
2	3	Madeleine Pape	Australia	2:06.03	Q
3	3	Irina Maracheva	Russia	2:06.16	Q
4	3	Aina Valatkevičiūtė	Lithuania	2:06.28	q
5	4	Janet Achola	Uganda	2:06.16	Q, PB
6	2	Yuliya Tutayeva	Russia	2:08.65	Q
7	2	Veronika Mráčková	Czech Republic	2:08.89	Q
8	3	Jelena Anđelković	Serbia	2:08.95	q, PB
9	1	Olga Cristea	Moldova	2:08.98	Q
10	2	Anja Puc	Slovenia	2:08.99	Q
11	2	Jevgenia Mateisuk	Estonia	2:08.95	q, PB
12	1	Margarita Matsko	Kazakhstan	2:09.11	Q
13	1	Lorenza Canali	Italy	2:09.81	Q
14	3	Zhang Liqiu	China	2:10.24	q
15	4	Olha Zavhorodnya	Ukraine	2:09.81	Q
16	3	Marina Petkova	Bulgaria	2:11.48	
17	1	Jekaterina Šakovič	Lithuania	2:11.69	
18	4	Slađana Perunović	Montenegro	2:13.41	Q
19	3	Rashida Ayumah	Ghana	2:13.46	
20	4	Marija Papić	Serbia	2:13.98	
21	2	Cecilia Gutiérrez	Guatemala	2:16.43	
22	2	Nilanka Aberatne	Sri Lanka	2:18.41	
23	2	Amina Bettiche	Algeria	2:18.69	
24	4	Leong Ka Man	Macau	2:20.63	PB
25	1	Roselyn Runyanga	Zimbabwe	2:49.55	PB
	4	Liu Qing	China	DNF	
	1	Degbotse-Goe Seenam	Togo	DNS	
	1	Mariama Mmadi	Comoros	DNS	
	4	Ayetebe Restituta Bibang	Equatorial Guinea	DNS	
	4	Carolin Walter	Germany	DNS	

=== Semifinals ===
Qualification: First 3 of each semifinal (Q) and the next 2 fastest (q) qualified for the finals.

Rank	Heat	Name	Nationality	Time	Notes
1	2	Madeleine Pape	Australia	2:04.04	Q
2	2	Rebecca Johnstone	Canada	2:04.13	Q
2	2	Olha Zavhorodnya	Ukraine	2:04.13	Q
4	2	Irina Maracheva	Russia	2:04.35	q
5	1	Olga Cristea	Moldova	2:04.54	Q
6	1	Margarita Matsko	Kazakhstan	2:04.71	Q
7	1	Yuliya Tutayeva	Russia	2:04.78	Q
8	1	Veronika Mráčková	Czech Republic	2:04.87	q
9	1	Aina Valatkevičiūtė	Lithuania	2:04.94	SB
10	2	Lorenza Canali	Italy	2:06.07	
11	1	Anja Puc	Slovenia	2:06.86	PB
12	2	Jevgenia Mateisuk	Estonia	2:07.67	PB
13	2	Zhang Liqiu	China	2:08.37	
14	2	Janet Achola	Uganda	2:08.78	
15	1	Jelena Anđelković	Serbia	2:10.86	
16	1	Slađana Perunović	Montenegro	2:12.55	

=== Final ===
Rank	Name	Nationality	Time	Notes
1st place, gold medalist(s)	Madeleine Pape	Australia	2:01.91	SB
2nd place, silver medalist(s)	Olga Cristea	Moldova	2:03.49	
3rd place, bronze medalist(s)	Rebecca Johnstone	Canada	2:03.67	
4	Olha Zavhorodnya	Ukraine	2:03.84	
5	Yuliya Tutayeva	Russia	2:03.88	
6	Veronika Mráčková	Czech Republic	2:04.01	
7	Margarita Matsko	Kazakhstan	2:04.60	
8	Irina Maracheva	Russia	2:05.15	
