= Athletics at the 2015 Summer Universiade – Women's 1500 metres =

The women's 1500 metres event at the 2015 Summer Universiade was held on 10 and 12 July at the Gwangju Universiade Main Stadium.

Docus Ajok of Uganda was pulled out of the 1500 metres heats because of the close proximity to the 800 metres final to which she had originally advanced. However, she was later disqualified for a lane violation in the semifinal of that event and the organizers decided to let her compete in the 1500 metres final despite not appearing in the heats. Ajok ended up winning the gold medal.

== Medalists ==
Gold	Silver	Bronze
Docus Ajok; Uganda	Gabriela Stafford; Canada	Kristina Ugarova; Russia

== Results ==
=== Heats ===
Qualification: First 4 in each heat (Q) and next 4 fastest (q) qualified for the semifinals.

Rank	Heat	Name	Nationality	Time	Notes
1	2	Diana Mezuliáníková	Czech Republic	4:18.11	Q
2	2	Nikki Hamblin	New Zealand	4:18.34	Q
3	2	Gabriela Stafford	Canada	4:18.35	Q
4	2	Claudia Bobocea	Romania	4:18.39	Q
5	2	Kristina Ugarova	Russia	4:18.54	q
6	2	Carise Thompson	Canada	4:19.07	q
7	1	Angela Piccirillo	United States	4:21.03	Q
8	1	Stephanie Schappert	United States	4:21.51	Q
9	1	Matea Parlov	Croatia	4:22.12	Q
10	1	Barbara Bressi	Italy	4:22.35	Q
11	1	Olesya Muratova	Russia	4:24.31	q
12	2	Kseniya Faiskanova	Kyrgyzstan	4:26.49	q, PB
13	1	Christina Toogood	Norway	4:30.16	
14	1	Mateja Pokrivač	Slovenia	4:33.12	
15	1	Kelly Nevolihhin	Estonia	4:34.29	SB
16	1	Febia Chemutai	Uganda	4:46.18	
17	2	Janet Okeago	Kenya	4:46.61	
18	2	Sebenzile Simelane	Swaziland	5:25.43	
	1	Keita Andjayi	Gabon	DNF	
	1	Katarzyna Broniatowska	Poland	DNS	
	2	Meriem Aiach	Morocco	DNS	
	2	Docus Ajok	Uganda	DNS	
	2	Marcelat Sakobi	Democratic Republic of the Congo	DNS	

=== Final ===
Official Video

Rank	Name	Nationality	Time	Notes
1st place, gold medalist(s)	Docus Ajok	Uganda	4:18.53	SB
2nd place, silver medalist(s)	Gabriela Stafford	Canada	4:19.27	
3rd place, bronze medalist(s)	Kristina Ugarova	Russia	4:19.78	
4	Stephanie Schappert	United States	4:19.83	
5	Carise Thompson	Canada	4:20.07	
6	Diana Mezuliáníková	Czech Republic	4:23.14	
7	Angela Piccirillo	United States	4:23.40	
8	Olesya Muratova	Russia	4:26.73	
9	Matea Parlov	Croatia	4:27.24	
10	Barbara Bressi	Italy	4:27.89	
11	Kseniya Faiskanova	Kyrgyzstan	4:29.83	
12	Claudia Bobocea	Romania	4:31.27	
	Nikki Hamblin	New Zealand	DNS	
