= 2007 European Athletics U23 Championships – Women's 1500 metres =

The women's 1500 metres event at the 2007 European Athletics U23 Championships was held in Debrecen, Hungary, at Gyulai István Atlétikai Stadion on 15 July.

== Medalists ==
Gold	Abby Westley; United Kingdom
Silver	Lizi Braithwaite; United Kingdom
Bronze	Tatyana Beltyukova; Russia

== Results ==
=== Final ===
15 July

Rank	Name	Nationality	Time	Notes
1st place, gold medalist(s)	Abby Westley	United Kingdom	4:15.48	
2nd place, silver medalist(s)	Lizi Braithwaite	United Kingdom	4:16.45	
3rd place, bronze medalist(s)	Tatyana Beltyukova	Russia	4:16.49	
4	Susan Kuijken	Netherlands	4:17.90	
5	Hannah England	United Kingdom	4:18.70	
6	Dominika Główczewska	Poland	4:19.05	
7	Elena García	Spain	4:19.66	
8	Ombretta Bongiovanni	Italy	4:21.66	
9	Ercilia Machado	Portugal	4:22.69	
10	Valentina Costanza	Italy	4:22.95	
11	Rose-Anne Galligan	Ireland	4:23.56	
12	Jennifer Gueret-Laferte	France	4:26.25	
13	Eglė Krištaponytė	Lithuania	4:27.19	
14	Linda Byrne	Ireland	4:27.44	
15	Margherita Magnani	Italy	4:32.20	

== Participation ==
According to an unofficial count, 15 athletes from 10 countries participated in the event.

- France (1)
- Ireland (2)
- Italy (3)
- Lithuania (1)
- Netherlands (1)
- Poland (1)
- Portugal (1)
- Russia (1)
- Spain (1)
- United Kingdom (3)
