= Madeleine Pape =

Australian sociologist and former middle-distance runner

- Born: 24 February 1984 (age 42); Melbourne, Australia

Academic background
- Education: Monash University; University of Wisconsin–Madison
- Thesis: Inclusion and Exclusion: Institutional Reproductions of Sex and Gender (2019)
- Doctoral advisor: Myra Marx Ferree; Joan Fujimura

Academic work
- Discipline: Sociology
- Sub-discipline: Sex and gender distinction, sports science
- Sports career
- Nationality: Australia
- Sport: Athletics
- Event: 800 metres
- Club: Waverley Athletics Club
- Coached by: Terry McGrath

Sports achievements and titles
- Personal bests: 400 m: 52.68 (2009); 800 m: 1:59.92 (2008); 1500 m: 4:22.36 (2007)
Medal record
Women's athletics
Representing Australia
Universiade
Gold medal – first place	2009 Belgrade	800 m

Madeleine Pape (born 24 February 1984) is an Australian sociologist and former middle-distance athlete.

== Athletic career ==
Pape grew up in Emerald, Victoria and was inspired to focus on running after seeing local athletes represent Australia in the 2006 Commonwealth Games. In 2008, she set a personal best of 1:59.92 in the 800 metres while winning the Sydney Athletics Grand Prix. Pape competed in the women's 800 metres at the 2008 Summer Olympics in Beijing, where she finished her heat in sixth place, failing to advance to the semi-finals. Pape went on to win an 800m gold medal at the 2009 Summer Universiade in Belgrade, finishing in 2:01.91. However, in 2010, she had a tendon injury that ended her athletics career.

== Academic career ==
In 2011, Pape completed a B.A. with honors, majoring in sociology, at Monash University. She then moved to the United States, where she earned an M.S. and PhD in sociology at the University of Wisconsin–Madison. Her doctoral thesis examined sex and gender in sport and biomedicine. In 2020, Pape joined the University of Lausanne as a Postdoctoral Fellow.
