= Rowing at the 2013 Summer Universiade – Women's double sculls =

Rowing event

The women's double sculls competition at the 2013 Summer Universiade in Kazan took place the Kazan Rowing Centre.

== Results ==
=== Heats ===
==== Heat 1 ====
| Rank | Rower | Country | Time | Notes |
|---|---|---|---|---|
| 1 | Ulla Varvio; Eeva Karppinen | Finland | 7:19.19 | Q |
| 2 | Ekaterina Potapova; Maria Krasilnikova | Russia | 7:19.75 | Q |
| 3 | Sara Bertolasi; Alessandra Patelli | Italy | 7:25.26 | Q |
| 4 | Marianne Madsen; Inger Seim Kavli | Norway | 7:32.24 | R |
| 5 | Stefanie Borzacchini; Katharina Lobnig | Austria | 7:32.31 | R |

==== Heat 2 ====
| Rank | Rower | Country | Time | Notes |
|---|---|---|---|---|
| 1 | Donata Vištartaitė; Milda Valčiukaitė | Lithuania | 7:13.58 | Q |
| 2 | Tatsiana Kukhta; Katsiaryna Shliupskaya | Belarus | 7:21.00 | Q |
| 3 | Sophie Paul; Ulrike Törpsch | Germany | 7:33.58 | Q |
| 4 | Claudia Hazelwood; Imogen Mackie | South Africa | 7:47.85 | R |

==== Heat 3 ====
| Rank | Rower | Country | Time | Notes |
|---|---|---|---|---|
| 1 | Anna Kravchenko; Olena Buriak | Ukraine | 7:29.27 | Q |
| 2 | Lenka Antošová; Denisa Cvancarova | Czech Republic | 7:41.13 | Q |
| 3 | Rebeka Glaser; Virag Dohovics | Hungary | 7:47.49 | Q |
| 4 | Madara Strautmane; Vineta Moca | Latvia | 7:51.54 | R |

=== Repechage ===
| Rank | Rower | Country | Time | Notes |
|---|---|---|---|---|
| 1 | Stefanie Borzacchini; Katharina Lobnig | Austria | 8:01.81 | Q |
| 2 | Marianne Madsen; Inger Seim Kavli | Norway | 8:09.79 | Q |
| 3 | Madara Strautmane; Vineta Moca | Latvia | 8:10.34 | Q |
| 4 | Claudia Hazelwood; Imogen Mackie | South Africa | 8:14.71 | |

=== Semifinals ===
==== Semifinal 1 ====
| Rank | Rower | Country | Time | Notes |
|---|---|---|---|---|
| | Sara Bertolasi; Alessandra Patelli | Italy | | |
| | Tatsiana Kukhta; Katsiaryna Shliupskaya | Belarus | | |
| | Ulla Varvio; Eeva Karppinen | Finland | | |
| | Anna Kravchenko; Olena Buriak | Ukraine | | |
| | Rebeka Glaser; Virag Dohovics | Hungary | | |
| | Marianne Madsen; Inger Seim Kavli | Norway | | |

==== Semifinal 2 ====
| Rank | Rower | Country | Time | Notes |
|---|---|---|---|---|
| | Madara Strautmane; Vineta Moca | Latvia | | |
| | Sophie Paul; Ulrike Törpsch | Germany | | |
| | Ekaterina Potapova; Maria Krasilnikova | Russia | | |
| | Donata Vištartaitė; Milda Valčiukaitė | Lithuania | | |
| | Lenka Antošová; Denisa Cvancarova | Czech Republic | | |
| | Stefanie Borzacchini; Katharina Lobnig | Austria | | |
