= Kristina Ugarova =

Russian middle-distance runner

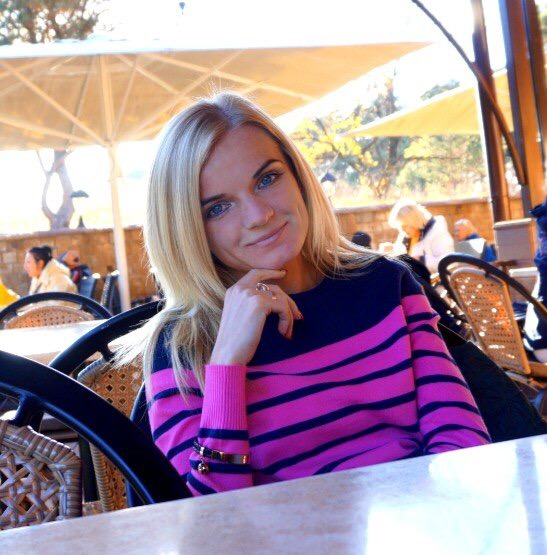

Personal information
- Born: Kristina Khaleyeva; October 22, 1987 (age 39) Russia
- Height: 5 ft 3 in (1.60 m)
- Weight: 100 lb (45 kg)

Sport
- Country: Russia
- Events: 1500 m, 800 m
- Club: Nike
- Turned pro: 2008

Achievements and titles
- Personal bests: 1500 m: 4:00.53 Mile : 4:29.73 800 m: 2:00.38
Medal record
Women's athletics
Representing Russia

Kristina Ugarova (nee Khaleyeva; born October 22, 1987) is a Russian middle distance runner. She holds best of 4:00.53 minutes for the 1500 meters and 2:00.38 minutes for the 800 meters.

== Doping ==
On 29 November 2016, the Court of Arbitration for Sport (CAS) banned Ugarova from competition, along with Tatyana Chernova and Ekaterina Sharmina. CAS stated, "All three athletes have been found to have committed an anti-doping rule violation - of the International Athletic Association Federation (IAAF) Competition Rules after analysis of their Athlete Biological Passports (ABP) showed evidence of blood doping."

== International ==
Ugarova competed in athletics at the 2012 Summer Olympics. She was awarded the bronze medal in the women's 1500 metres at the 2015 Summer Universiade before analysis found evidence of doping. Ugarova's times improved from 2:03 to 2:00 and 4:08 to 4:00 in three years from 2009 to 2012.
