= Ciara Everard =

Irish middle-distance runner

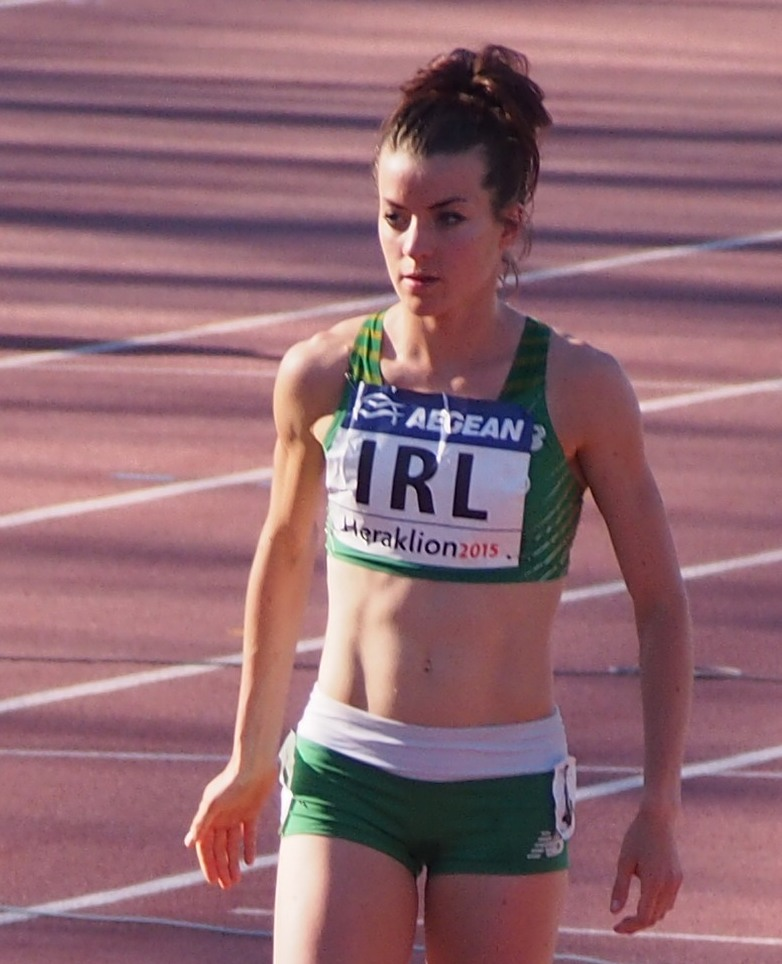
- Ciara Everand in 2015

Personal information
- Nationality: Irish
- Born: 10 July 1990 (age 36)

Sport
- Sport: Track and field
- Event: 800m

Ciara Everard (born 10 July 1990) is an Irish middle-distance runner. She competed in the 800 metres event at the 2014 IAAF World Indoor Championships.

Everard works as a physiotherapist.

== Competition record ==
Year	Competition	Venue	Position	Event	Notes
Representing Ireland
2008	World Junior Championships	Bydgoszcz, Poland	26th (h)	800 m	2:09.85
2009	European Junior Championships	Novi Sad, Serbia	17th (h)	800 m	2:09.97
2013	European Indoor Championships	Gothenburg, Sweden	6th	800 m	2:02.55
2013	Universiade	Kazan, Russia	11th (sf)	800 m	2:05.59
2014	World Indoor Championships	Sopot, Poland	15th (h)	800 m	2:03.69
2015	European Indoor Championships	Prague, Czech Republic	5th (sf)	800 m	2:06.14
2015	Universiade	Gwangju, South Korea	6th	800 m	2:02.46
2015	World Championships	Beijing, China	40th (h)	800 m	2:03.98
2016	Olympic Games	Rio de Janeiro, Brazil	57th (h)	800 m	2:07.91
