= Dorcus Ajok =

Ugandan middle-distance runner

Personal information
- Born: 12 July 1994 (age 31) Alebtong, Uganda
- Education: Ndejje University

Sport
- Sport: Athletics
- Event(s): 800 m, 1500 m
Medal record
Representing Uganda
Summer Universiade
Gold medal – first place	2015 Gwangju	1500m
Silver medal – second place	2017 Taipei	1500m
Bronze medal – third place	2017 Taipei	800m
Bronze medal – third place	2019 Naples	800m

Dorcus Ajok (born 12 July 1994) is a Ugandan middle-distance runner. She represented her country in the 800 metres at the 2017 World Championships reaching the semifinals. In addition, she won the gold medal in the 1500 metres at the 2015 Summer Universiade.

== Background and Education ==
Dorcus Ajok was born in Akura sub-county, present day Alebtong District. She is the second of nine children born to Dicken Atworo, a teacher and Margaret Akello, a housewife.

She attended Dokolo Primary School before proceeding to Aloi Secondary School for her O Levels (UCE). She later attended Bright College, Lira for her A Levels thereafter joining Ndejje University.

In 2019, Ajok was asked to take a testosterone test by her national athletics federation. She was never shown the results of the test, but she was banned by World Athletics from competing in 800 m or 1500 m races without lowering her testosterone under their differences in sex development rules.

== International competitions ==
Year	Competition	Venue	Position	Event	Notes
Representing Uganda
2013	Universiade	Kazan, Russia	–	800 m	DQ
2013	Universiade	Kazan, Russia	11th	1500 m	4:25.83
2015	Universiade	Gwangju, South Korea	6th (h)	800 m	2:04.70^{1}
2015	Universiade	Gwangju, South Korea	1st	1500 m	4:18.53
2015	Universiade	Gwangju, South Korea	5th	4 × 400 m relay	3:45.40
2017	World Championships	London, United Kingdom	21st (sf)	800 m	2:02.00
2017	Universiade	Taipei, Taiwan	3rd	800 m	2:03.22
2017	Universiade	Taipei, Taiwan	2nd	1500 m	4:19.48
2017	Universiade	Taipei, Taiwan	6th	4 × 400 m relay	3:43.38
2018	Commonwealth Games	Gold Coast, Australia	6th	800 m	2:01.22
2019	Universiade	Naples, Italy	3rd	800 m	2:02.31

^{1}Disqualified in the semifinals

== Personal bests ==
Outdoor

- 800 metres – 2:00.79 (Huelva 2017)
- 1500 metres – 4:16.44 (Kazan 2013)
- One mile – 4:43.1 (Kampala 2014)
