= Selah Jepleting Busienei =

Kenyan female middle-distance runner

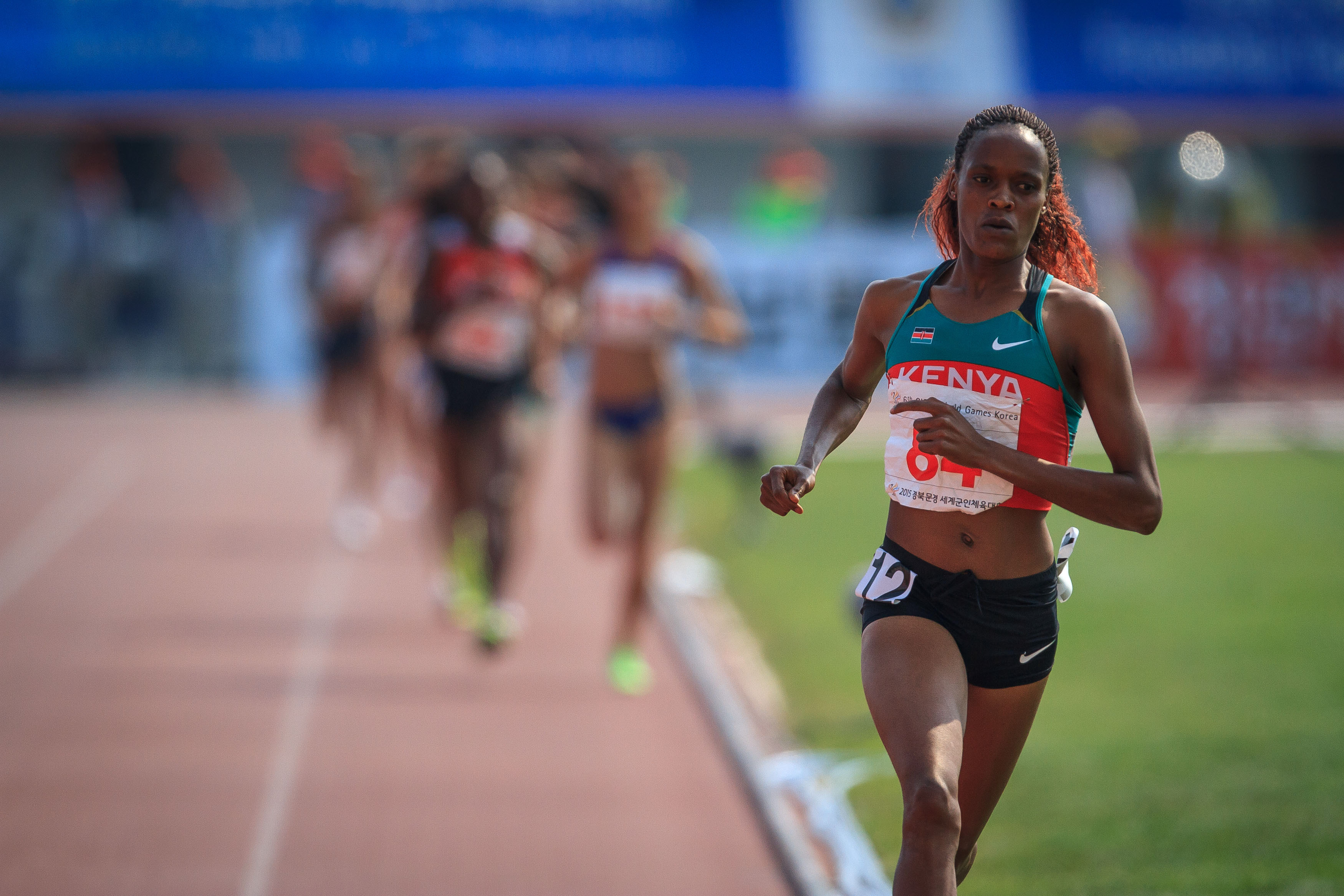
- Selah Jepleting Busienei in 2015

Medal record

Women's athletics

Representing Kenya

Military World Games
| Gold medal – first place | 2015 Mungyeong | 1500 m |

IAAF World Relays
| Silver medal – second place | 2015 Nassau | Medley relay |

Selah Jepleting Busienei (born 27 December 1991) is a Kenyan female middle-distance runner who mainly runs in the 1500 metres. She holds a personal best of 4:06.28 minutes for that event.

Born in Uasin Gishu County, she made her first major appearance at the 2014 Commonwealth Games, reaching the 1500 m final. She was also a finalist at that year's African Championships. She closed the year with a win at the Shoe4Africa 5km.

The following year she was selected for Kenya's distance medley relay team at the 2015 IAAF World Relays and (running alongside Joy Nakhumicha Sakari, Sylivia Chematui Chesebe, and Virginia Nyambura Nganga) she helped set an African and Commonwealth record for the event at 10:43.35 minutes for the silver medal behind the American women. Individual success followed at the 2015 Military World Games, where she claimed 1500 m gold and also placed fifth in the 800 m. Her winning time in the 1500 m of 4:07.58 minutes was also a personal best.

Busienei returned at continental level for the 2016 African Championships in Athletics and placed eighth again for the second time running.

== Personal bests ==
- 800 metres – 2:01.17 min (2013)
- 1500 metres – 4:06.28 min (2016)
- 3000 metres – 8:42.01 min (2016)
- Distance medley relay – 10:43.35 min (2015)

All information from All-Athletics profile.

== International competitions ==
| Year | Competition | Venue | Position | Event | Notes |
|---|---|---|---|---|---|
| 2014 | Commonwealth Games | Glasgow, Scotland | 12th | 1500 m | 4:17.88 |
| 2014 | African Championships | Marrakesh, Morocco | 8th | 1500 m | 4:19.24 |
| 2015 | World Relays | Nassau, Bahamas | 2nd | Distance medley relay | 10:43.35 AR |
| 2015 | Military World Games | Mungyeong, South Korea | 5th | 800 m | 2:03.01 |
| 2015 | Military World Games | Mungyeong, South Korea | 1st | 1500 m | 4:07.58 |
| 2016 | African Championships | Durban, South Africa | 8th | 1500 m | 4:09.14 |
