= Nataliia Lupu =

Ukrainian athlete of Romanian descent (born 1987)

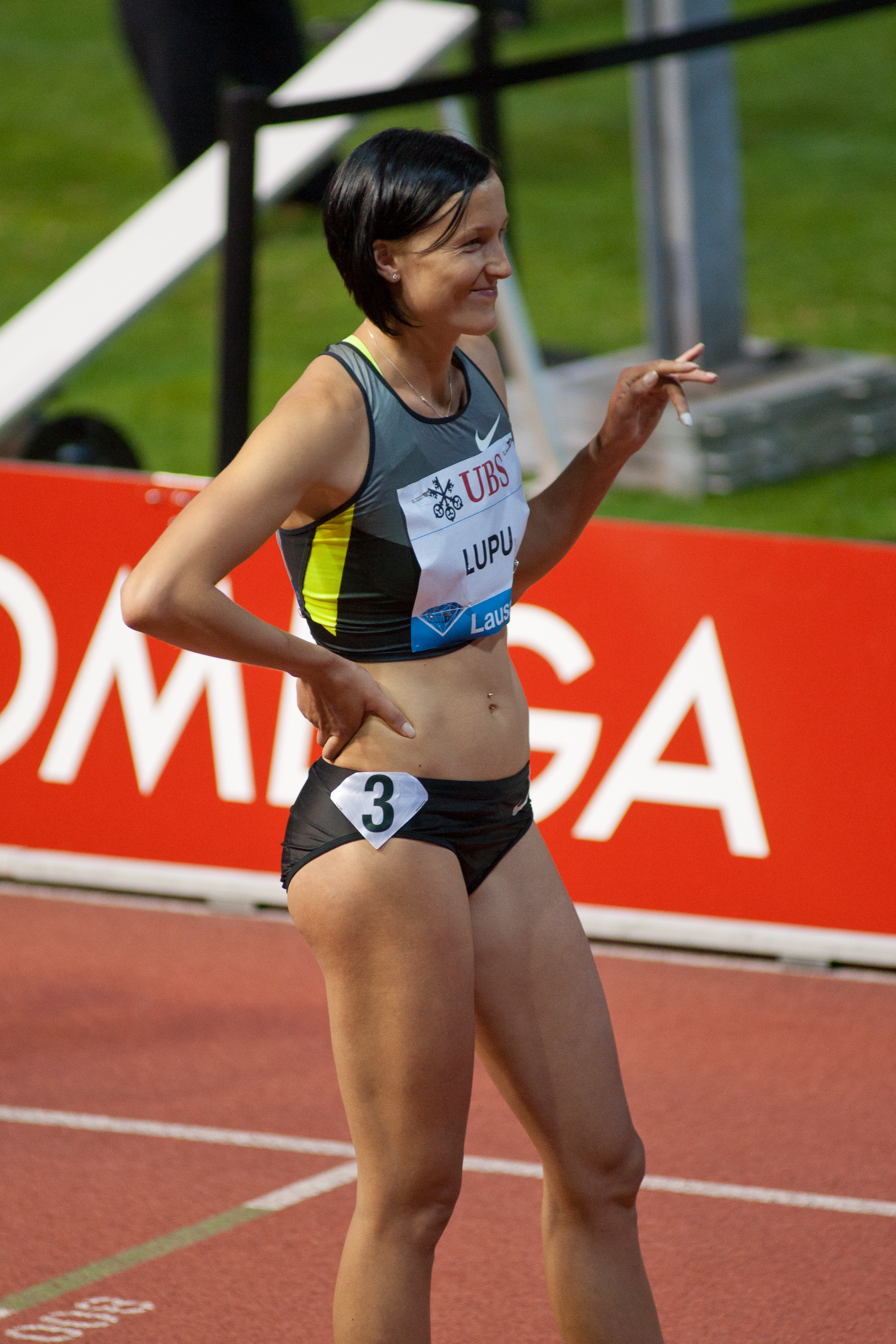
- Nataliia Lupu, Athletissima 2012.

Medal record

Women's athletics

Representing Ukraine

World Indoor Championships
Silver medal – second place	2012 Istanbul	800 m

European Team Championships
Gold medal – first place	2010 Bergen	800 m

European Indoor Championships
Gold medal – first place	2013 Gothenburg	800 m
Silver medal – second place	2015 Prague	800 m

Military World Games
Gold medal – first place	2015 Mungyeong	800 m
Silver medal – second place	2015 Mungyeong	4 × 400 m relay

European Youth Olympic Festival
Gold medal – first place	2003 Paris	1500 m

Nataliia Lupu (born 4 November 1987) is a Ukrainian who specializes in 800 metres.

== Career ==
She finished fourth at the 2006 World Junior Championships. She competed at the 2009 European Indoor Championships, the 2009 World Championships and the 2010 World Indoor Championships.

At the 2014 World Indoor Championships, she tested positive for the use of a prohibited stimulant, methylhexaneamine, receiving a 9-month ban. The ban lasted from 7 March 2014 to 21 January 2015.

Lupu served an 8-year ban from 2016 to 2024 for a second career anti-doping rule violation relating to use of steroids and human growth hormone.

== Achievements ==
Year	Competition	Venue	Position	Event	Notes
Representing Ukraine
2004	World Junior Championships	Grosseto, Italy	25th (h)	800 m	2:09.30
2006	World Junior Championships	Beijing, China	4th	800 m	2:05.05
2006	World Junior Championships	Beijing, China	7th	4 × 400 m relay	3:36.97
2007	European U23 Championships	Debrecen, Hungary	13th (h)	800 m	2:08.81
2009	European U23 Championships	Kaunas, Lithuania	2nd	800 m	2:01.08
2009	European U23 Championships	Kaunas, Lithuania	4th	4 × 400 m relay	3:30.78
2012	World Indoor Championships	Istanbul, Turkey	2nd	800 m	1:59.67
2012	Olympic Games	London, United Kingdom	18th (sf)	800 m	2:01.63
2013	European Indoor Championships	Gothenburg, Sweden	1st	800 m	2:00.26
2013	World Championships	Moscow, Russia	7th	800 m	1:59.79
2014	World Indoor Championships	Sopot, Poland	DSQ (5th)	800 m	DSQ (2:01.17)
2015	European Indoor Championships	Prague, Czech Republic	3rd	800 m	2:02.25
2015	European Indoor Championships	Prague, Czech Republic	5th	4 × 400 m relay	3:32.39
2015	World Championships	Beijing, China	6th	800 m	1:58.99
2015	World Championships	Beijing, China	6th	4 × 400 m relay	3:25.94
2015	Military World Games	Mungyeong, South Korea	1st	800 m	1:59.99
2016	European Championships	Amsterdam, Netherlands	9th (sf)	800 m	2:01.74
2016	Olympic Games	Rio de Janeiro, Brazil	DSQ (22nd)	800 m	DSQ (2:02.10)

== Personal bests ==
Event	Time (m:s)	Venue	Date
400 m	52.91	Vinnytsia, Ukraine	15 August 2011
800 m	1:58.46	Yalta, Ukraine	14 June 2012
