= Vytautas Vasiliauskas =

Lithuanian citizen (1930–2015)

- Born: 21 October 1930; Didvyriai, Lithuania
- Died: 7 November 2015 (aged 85)
- Occupation: former KGB officer
- Status: Acquitted
- Penalty: 6 years imprisonment (However, the European Court of Human Rights in a 9-to-8 decision overturned the conviction in October 2015.)

Details
- Victims: Jonas and Antanas Aštrauskas
- Date: January 2, 1953

Vytautas Vasiliauskas (21 October 1930 – 7 November 2015) was a Lithuanian citizen who was a collaborator with the Soviet occupation regime and who worked with the Soviet Ministry of State Security. He was convicted of genocide for his role in the Soviet murder of Lithuanian resistance fighters.

In 2011 Vasiliauskas was found guilty by Kaunas Regional Court under Article 99 of the Lithuanian Criminal Code of the Soviet genocide committed in January 1953 of two Lithuanian partisans, and was sentenced to six years imprisonment. The verdict was upheld by the Court of Appeal and by the Supreme Court. However, the European Court of Human Rights in a 9–8 decision overturned the conviction in October 2015, finding that the prosecution was unlawful under article 7 of the ECHR because genocide had not yet been criminalized in 1953. He died on 7 November 2015, at the age of 85.
