= Elena Kotulskaya =

Russian middle-distance runner

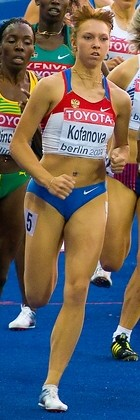
- Elena Kotulskaya in 2009

Personal information
- Born: August 8, 1988 (age 38)

Sport
- Country: Russia
- Sport: Women's athletics
Medal record
European Indoor Championships
Silver medal – second place	2013 Gothenburg	800 m

Elena Vladimirovna Kotulskaya (formerly Kofanova; Russian: Елена Владимировна Кофанова; born August 8, 1988) is a Russian runner who specializes in the 800 metres.

She is serving a four year doping ban from November 7, 2025 due to the McLaren Report. Her results from June 14, 2013 are disqualified.

== International competitions ==
Representing Russia
Year	Competition	Venue	Position	Event	Notes
2009	European U23 Championships	Kaunas, Lithuania	1st	800 m	1:58.94
2009	World Championships	Berlin, Germany	18th (sf)	800 m	2:02.02
2010	DécaNation	Annecy, France	1st	800 m	2:00.50
2011	Summer Universiade	Shenzhen, China	2nd	800 m	1:59.94
2012	World Indoor Championships	Istanbul, Turkey	5th	800 m	2:00.67
2013	European Indoor Championships	Gothenburg, Sweden	2nd	800 m	2:00.98
2013	World Championships	Moscow, Russia	14th (sf)	800 m	2:01.75

== See also ==
- List of European Athletics Indoor Championships medalists (women)
