= Ma Yugui =

Chinese long-distance runner

Personal information
- Nationality: Chinese
- Born: 4 March 1995 (age 30)

Sport
- Sport: Athletics
- Event: Marathon

Ma Yugui (born 4 March 1995) is a Chinese athlete. She competed in the women's marathon event at the 2019 World Athletics Championships.
