= Machteld Mulder =

Dutch middle distance runner (born 1989)

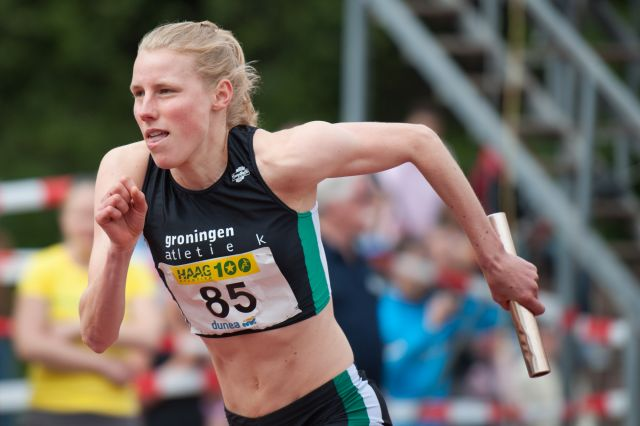

Personal information
- Full name: Machteld Anna Mulder
- Born: 21 February 1989 (age 37) Wijdenes, Netherlands
- Years active: 2001-present
- Height: 1.77 m (5 ft 10 in)
- Weight: 59 kg (130 lb)

Achievements and titles
- Personal best(s): 400 metres – 54.92 (2008); 400 metres ind. – 55.33 (2007); 800 metres – 2:02.05 (2008); 800 metres ind. - 2:05.18 (2010)
- Updated on 3 August 2013

Machteld Anna Mulder (born 21 February 1989 in Wijdenes) is a Dutch middle distance runner.

== Career highlights ==
European Youth Olympic Festival
2005 - Lignano, 3rd, 800 m

European Junior Championships
2007 - Hengelo, 3rd, 800 m

Dutch National Championships
2007 - Ghent, 2nd, 400 m ind.
2007 - Amsterdam, 1st, 800 m
2009 - Apeldoorn, 2nd, 800 m ind.
2009 - Amsterdam, 1st, 800 m

World Junior Championships
2008 - Bydgoszcz, 3rd, 800 m

== Personal bests ==
| Distance | Mark | Date | Location |
|---|---|---|---|
| 400 m outdoor | 54.92 | 1 June 2008 | Groningen |
| 400 m indoor | 55.33 | 17 February 2007 | Ghent |
| 800 m outdoor | 2:02.05 | 11 July 2008 | Bydgoszcz |
| 800 m indoor | 2:05.18 | 7 February 2010 | Apeldoorn |
