= Iwona Lewandowska =

Polish long-distance runner

Iwona Lewandowska-Bernardelli
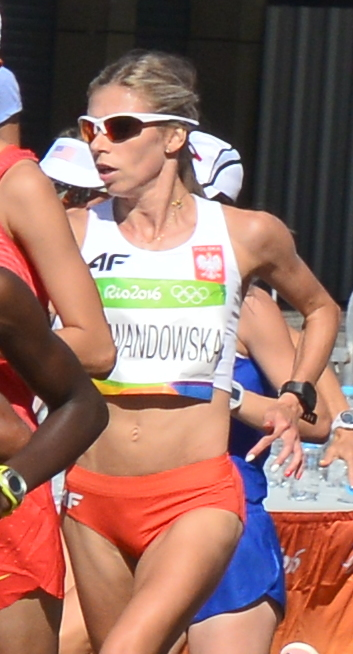
- Iwona Lewandowska-Bernardelli at the 2016 Summer Olympics

Personal information
- Born: 19 February 1985 (age 41) Lipno, Poland

Sport
- Sport: Track and field
- Event: Marathon

Iwona Lewandowska-Bernardelli (born 19 February 1985) is a Polish long-distance runner who specialises in the marathon. She competed in the women's marathon event at the 2016 Summer Olympics.
