= Margherita Magnani =

Italian middle-distance runner

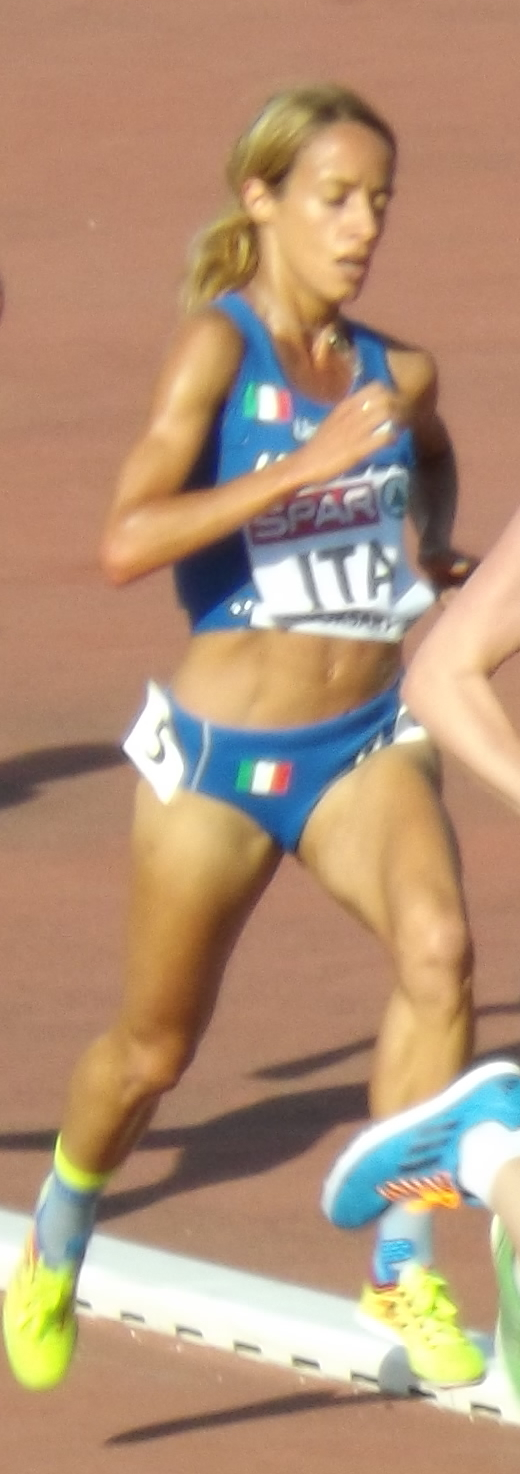
- Margherita Magnani at the 2015 European Team Championships

Personal information
- Nationality: Italian
- Born: 26 February 1987 (age 39) Cesena, Italy
- Height: 1.61 m (5 ft 3 1/2 in)
- Weight: 45 kg (99 lb)

Sport
- Country: Italy
- Sport: Athletics
- Event: Middle-distance running
- Club: G.S. Fiamme Gialle
- Coached by: Vittorio Di Saverio

Achievements and titles
- Personal bests: 1500 m 4:06.05 (2014); 3000 m: 8:51.81 (2014)

Margherita Magnani (born 26 February 1987) is an Italian middle-distance runner.

== Biography ==
2013 was the year of her statement, also at international level. Margherita Magnani won one time Italian Athletics Indoor Championships (2013) and her personal best on 1500 metres (4:06.34) is the 9th best berfomance of all-time in Italy, and 38th best world performance in the 2013. She in 2013 also participated at the European Indoor Championships, the European Team Championships and Mediterranean Games, she has 4 caps in national team from 2012.

== Progression ==
1500 metres

Year	Performance	Venue	Date	World Ranking
2013	4:06.34	(Turkey) Mersin	26 June	38th
2012	4:08.94	(Italy) Lignano Sabbiadoro	17 July	
2011	4:15.95	(Finland) Lappeenranta	13 August	
2010	4:12.54	(Belgium) Heusden-Zolder	10 July	

== Achievements ==
Year	Competition	Venue	Position	Event	Time	Notes
2007	European U23 Championships	Hungary	15th	1500m	4:32.20	
2009	European U23 Championships	(Lithuania) Kaunas	—	800m	DNF	
2009	European U23 Championships	(Lithuania) Kaunas	12th	1500m	4:26.62	
2013	European Indoor Championships	(Sweden) Gothenburg	Heat	1500 metres	4:15.85	
2013	European Team Championships	(United Kingdom) Gateshead	4th	1500 metres	4:11.01	
2013	Mediterranean Games	(Turkey) Mersin	4th	1500 metres	4:06.34	
2013	Universiade	(Russia) Kazan	3rd	1500 metres	4:09.72	
2017	World Championships	(United Kingdom) London	Quarter	1500 metres	4:09.15	

== National titles ==
Se won six national championships at individual senior level.

- Italian Athletics Championships
  - 1500 metres: 2015, 2016
- Italian Athletics Indoor Championships
  - 1500 metres: 2013, 2014, 2108
  - 3000 metres: 2018

== See also ==
- Italian all-time top lists - 1500 m
