= Mihail Krassilov =

Kazakhstani long-distance runner

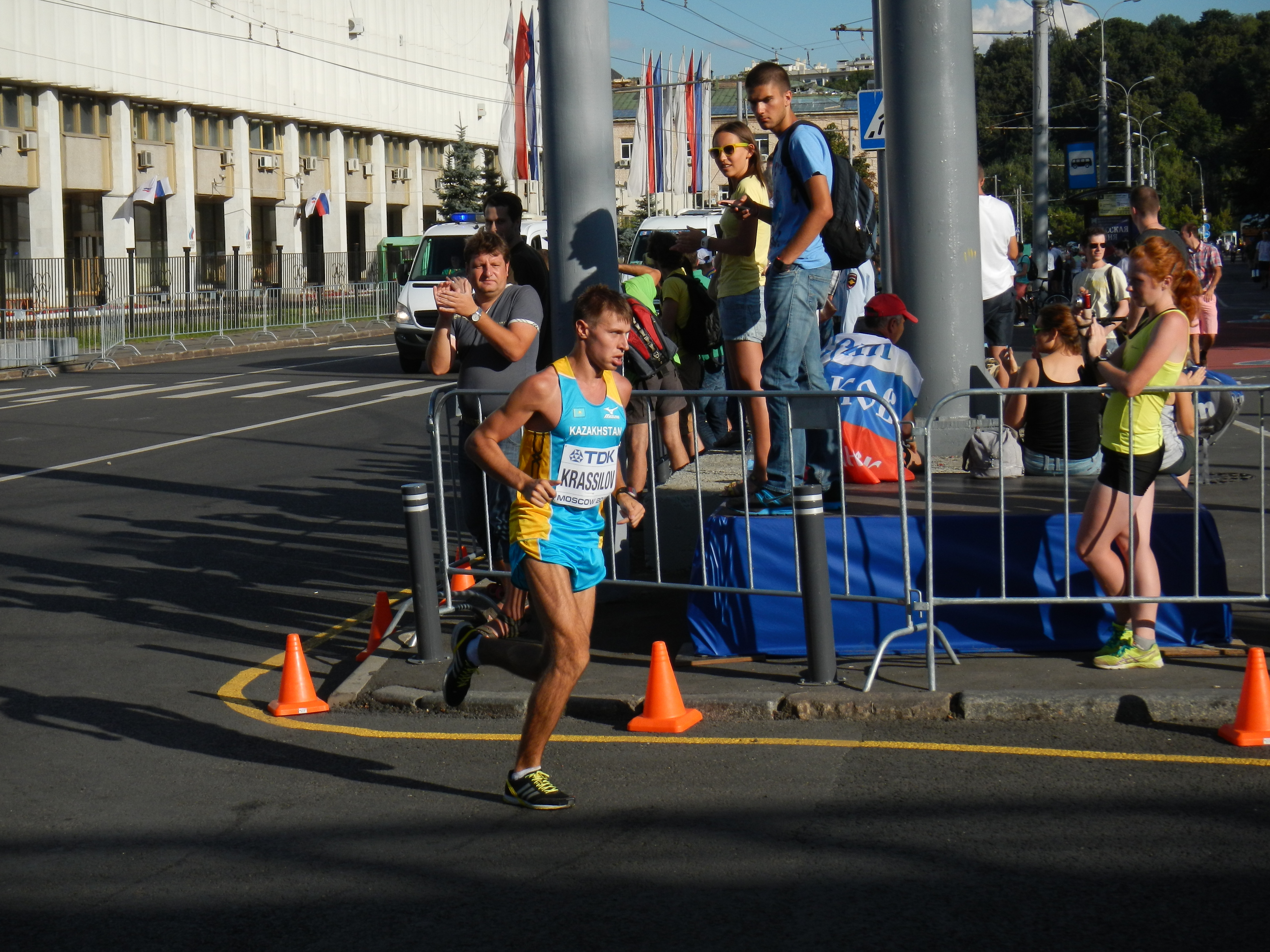
- Mihail Krassilov in 2013

Personal information
- Born: 5 March 1990 (age 36)

Sport
- Country: Kazakhstan
- Sport: Track and field
- Event: Marathon

Mihail Krassilov (born 5 March 1990) is a Kazakhstani long-distance runner who specialises in the marathon. He competed in the marathon event at the 2015 World Championships in Athletics in Beijing, China.

In 2010, he competed in the men's half marathon at the 2010 IAAF World Half Marathon Championships held in Nanning, China. He finished in 66th place. In 2017, he represented Kazakhstan at the 2017 Summer Universiade, held in Taipei, Taiwan, in the men's half marathon event. He did not finish his race.
