= Yekaterina Kupina =

Russia middle-distance runner

Personal information
- Nationality: Russian
- Born: 2 February 1986 (age 40)

Sport
- Sport: Track and field
- Event: 800m

Yekaterina Kupina (born 2 February 1986) is a Russian middle-distance runner. She competed in the 800 metres event at the 2014 IAAF World Indoor Championships.
