= Monika Stefanowicz =

Polish marathon runner

Monika Drybulska-Stefanowicz
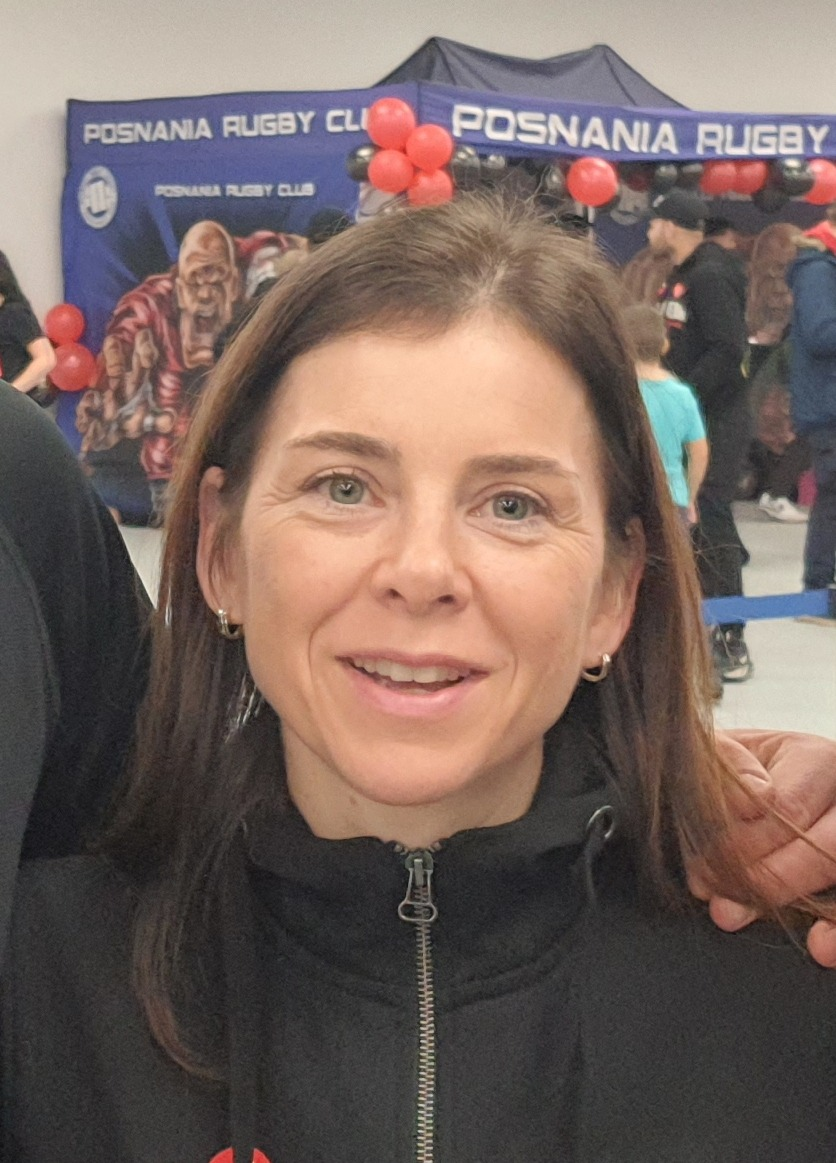
- Monika Drybulska-Stefanowicz in 2024

Personal information
- Full name: Monika Mariola Drybulska-Stefanowicz
- Nationality: Poland
- Born: 15 May 1980 (age 46) Wągrowiec, Poland
- Height: 1.60 m (5 ft 3 in)
- Weight: 45 kg (99 lb)

Sport
- Sport: Athletics
- Event: Marathon
- Club: WKS Grunwald Poznań
- Coached by: Gregorz Gajdus

Achievements and titles
- Personal best(s): Half-marathon: 1:13:34 (2002); Marathon: 2:29:57 (2003)

Monika Mariola Drybulska-Stefanowicz (born May 15, 1980 in Wągrowiec) is a Polish marathon runner. She set her personal best time of 2:29:57 at the 2003 Berlin Marathon. Drybulska also competed in the women's marathon at the 2004 Summer Olympics in Athens, but did not finish the race.

At the 2008 Summer Olympics in Beijing, Drybulska made her second appearance in the women's marathon, along with her compatriot Dorota Gruca. Unlike her previous Olympics, Drybulska successfully finished the race in twenty-fourth place, one second behind world-record holder Paula Radcliffe of Great Britain, with her seasonal best time of 2:32:39.
