= Zouhair Aouad =

Bahraini long-distance runner

Zouhair Aouad (born April 7, 1989) is a Moroccan-Born Bahraini long-distance runner. He competed at the 2016 Summer Olympics in the men's 5000 metres race but did not finish in the heats.
