= Emmanuel Kipsang =

Kenyan long-distance runner

Emmanuel Kiprono Kipsang (born 13 June 1991) is a Kenyan long-distance runner who competes in distances from 3000 metres up to the half marathon. He was the 2013 Kenyan champion in the 10,000 m.

Kipsang began competing professionally around 2012 and highlights of his 2013 season included third-place finishes at the Kenyan Athletics Championships and the Giro di Castelbuono 10K race, and a win at the Corribianco. He missed the 2014 season. With no high level performances in his youth, he only came to prominence as an adult following a 10,000 m win at age 21 at the 2015 Athletics Kenya meet final, ahead of the much better established Geoffrey Mutai and Mathew Kisorio. He also ran a best of 13:19.42 minutes for the 5000 metres – an event at which he placed third.

A member of the armed forces and stationed at the Laikipia Air Base, he won a 5000 metres/10,000 m double at the Kenyan Defence Forces Championships in 2015. He showed his ability over 3000 metres with a third-place finish at the London Grand Prix behind Mo Farah and Yenew Alamirew. A runner-up finish behind Edwin Soi in the 5000 m at the 2015 Athletics Kenya World Championship Trials brought him selection for this first national team.

== Personal bests ==
- 3000 metres – 7:37.05 min (2015)
- 5000 metres – 13:19.42 min (2015)
- 10,000 metres – 27:59.7 min (2013)
- 10K run – 28:06 min (2013)
- Half marathon – 63:55 min (2013)
