= Maryna Arzamasova =

Belarusian middle-distance runner

Marina Arzamasova
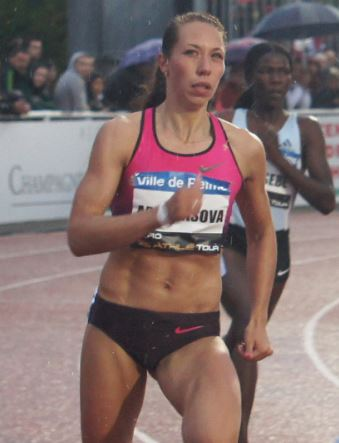
- Arzamasova in 2013

Personal information
- Nationality: Belarusian
- Born: 17 December 1987 (age 38) Minsk, Belarusian SSR, Soviet Union

Sport
- Sport: Athletics
- Event: 800 metres
- Club: Minsk

Achievements and titles
- Personal best: 800 m: 1:57.54 (2015)
Medal record
Women's athletics
Representing Belarus
World Championships
Gold medal – first place	2015 Beijing	800 m
World Indoor Championships
Bronze medal – third place	2014 Sopot	800 m
European Championships
Gold medal – first place	2014 Zürich	800 m
Bronze medal – third place	2012 Helsinki	800 m
European Indoor Championships
Bronze medal – third place	2013 Gothenburg	800 m

Marina Arzamasova (née Katowich, Belarusian: Марына Аляксандраўна Арзамасава (Катовіч), Russian: Марина Александровна Арзамасова; born 17 December 1987) is a Belarusian middle-distance runner.

Arzamasova was banned from 2019 to 2023 after testing positive for using ligandrol.

== Career and achievements ==
At the 2012 Summer Olympics, she competed in the Women's 800 metres. She won a bronze medal at the 2013 European Athletics Indoor Championships in the 800 metres. In August 2014, Arzamasova won 2014 European Athletics Championships in the 800 metres in a European leading time of 1:58.15. One year later she became world champion in the 800 metres at the 2015 World Championships in Athletics in Beijing.

In 2019, she won the silver medal in the team event at the 2019 European Games held in Minsk, Belarus.

== Doping ban ==
In December 2020, Arzamasova was served with a four-year ban backdated to July 2019 for an anti-doping rule violation after testing positive for ligandrol.

== Personal life ==
Her mother, Ravilya Agletdinova was also a middle-distance runner and won the 1500 m European title in 1986 – an achievement which Arzamasava repeated.
