= 2014 European Athletics Team Championships =

Sporting event in Europe

2014 European Team Championships
- Host city: Braunschweig, Germany (Super League)
- Nations: 47
- Events: 40
- Dates: 21–22 June 2014
- Main venue: Eintracht-Stadion (Super League)

The fifth European Athletics Team Championships took place on 21 and 22 June 2014.

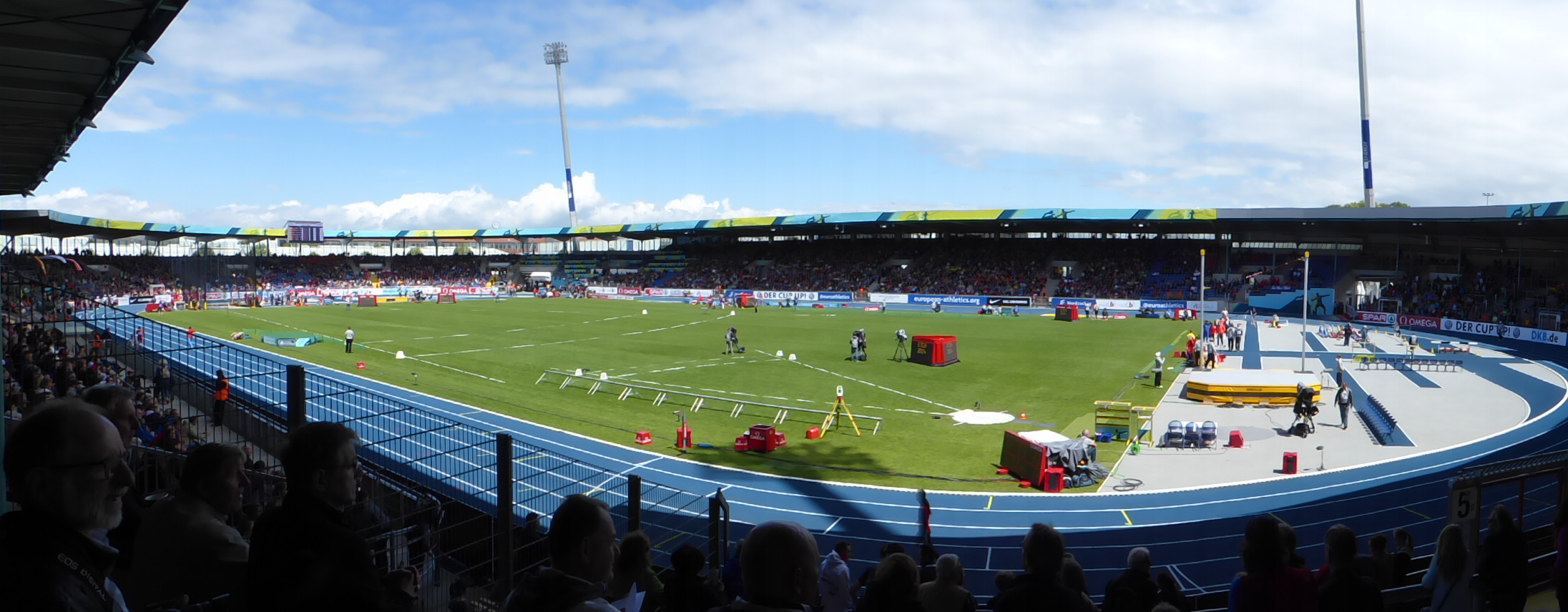
2014 Super League at the Eintracht-Stadion, Braunschweig.

== Calendar ==
Division	Date	Host city	Host country
Super League	21–22 June 2014	Braunschweig	Germany
First League	21–22 June 2014	Tallinn	Estonia
Second League	21–22 June 2014	Riga	Latvia
Third League	21–22 June 2014	Tbilisi	Georgia

== Super League ==
Place: Eintracht-Stadion, Braunschweig, Germany

=== Participating countries ===
- Czech Republic
- France
- Germany
- Great Britain
- Italy
- Netherlands
- Poland
- Russia
- Spain
- Sweden
- Turkey
- Ukraine

=== Men's events ===
Event	Gold		Silver		Bronze	
100 m	Jimmy Vicaut; France	10.03	Danny Talbot; Great Britain	10.30	Ramil Guliyev; Turkey	10.37
200 m	Karol Zalewski; Poland	20.56	Ramil Guliyev; Turkey	20.57	James Ellington; Great Britain	20.60
400 m	Mame-Ibra Anne; France	45.71	Pavel Ivashko; Russia	45.95	Daniel Awde; Great Britain	46.10
800 m	Timo Benitz; Germany	1:46.24; PB	Adam Kszczot; Poland	1:46.36	Giordano Benedetti; Italy	1:46.45
1500 m	Jakub Holuša; Czech Republic	3:37.74; CR	Homiyu Tesfaye; Germany	3:38.10	Marcin Lewandowski; Poland	3:38.19; PB
3000 m	Richard Ringer; Germany	7:50.99; CR	Jakub Holuša; Czech Republic	7:51.43	Antonio Abadía; Spain	7:52.22
5000 m	Arne Gabius; Germany	13:55.89	Jesús España; Spain	13:56.00	Ali Kaya; Turkey	13:56.64
3000 m steeplechase	Yoann Kowal; France	8:25.50; CR	Martin Grau; Germany	8:29.16	Nikolay Chavkin; Russia	8:30.61
110 m hurdles	Sergey Shubenkov; Russia	13.20; CR	William Sharman; Great Britain	13.21; PB	Pascal Martinot-Lagarde; France	13.35
400 m hurdles	Denis Kudryavtsev; Russia	49.38	Silvio Schirrmeister; Germany	49.80	Richard Yates; Great Britain	50.11
4 × 100 m	Richard Kilty; Harry Aikines-Aryeetey; James Ellington; Adam Gemili; Great Britain	38.51	Christian Blum; Sven Knipphals; Alexander Kosenkow; Julian Reus; Germany	38.88	Massimiliano Ferraro; Eseosa Desalu; Diego Marani; Delmas Obou; Italy	39.06
4 × 400 m	Maksim Dyldin; Lev Mosin; Pavel Trenikhin; Vladimir Krasnov; Russia	3:02.68	Mame-Ibra Anne; Teddy Venel; Thomas Jordier; Marc Macedot; France	3:03.05	Miguel Rigau; Kamghe Gaba; David Gollnow; Thomas Schneider; Germany	3:03.18
High jump	Andriy Protsenko; Ukraine	2.30	Andrey Silnov; Russia	2.28 =SB	Jaroslav Bába; Czech Republic	2.26; SB
Pole vault	Renaud Lavillenie; France	5.62	Aleksandr Gripich; Russia; Jan Kudlička; Czech Republic	5.62		
Long jump	Christian Reif; Germany	8.13	Greg Rutherford; Great Britain	7.99	Eusebio Cáceres; Spain	7.97
Triple jump	Aleksey Fyodorov; Russia	16.95; SB	Fabrizio Donato; Italy	16.82	Viktor Kuznetsov; Ukraine	16.63; SB
Shot put	David Storl; Germany	21.20; SB	Tomasz Majewski; Poland	20.57	Aleksandr Lesnoy; Russia	20.24
Discus	Robert Harting; Germany	67.42	Piotr Małachowski; Poland	65.35	Viktor Butenko; Russia	62.81
Hammer	Sergey Litvinov; Russia	76.34	Paweł Fajdek; Poland	75.26	Markus Esser; Germany	74.90
Javelin	Andreas Hofmann; Germany	86.13; PB	Dmitriy Tarabin; Russia	83.40; SB	Maksym Bohdan; Ukraine	80.93
WR world record | AR area record | CR championship record | GR games record | NR national record | OR Olympic record | PB personal best | SB season best | WL world leading (in a given season)

=== Women's events ===
Event	Gold		Silver		Bronze	
100 m	Myriam Soumaré; France	11.35	Jamile Samuel; Netherlands	11.42	Verena Sailer; Germany	11.45
200 m	Dafne Schippers; Netherlands	22.74	Nataliya Pohrebnyak; Ukraine	23.13	Anyika Onuora; Great Britain	23.24
400 m	Alena Tamkova; Russia	51.72	Esther Cremer; Germany	52.23	Olha Zemlyak; Ukraine	52.28
800 m	Yekaterina Poistogova; Russia	2:02.65	Rénelle Lamote; France	2:03.36	Olha Lyakhova; Ukraine	2:03.39
1500 m	Abeba Aregawi; Sweden	4:14.20	Anna Shchagina; Russia	4:15.04	Nataliya Pryshchepa; Ukraine	4:15.71
3000 m	Sifan Hassan; Netherlands	8:45.24; CR	Yelena Korobkina; Russia	8:51.00; PB	Nuria Fernández; Spain	8:51.54
5000 m	Meraf Bahta; Sweden	15:36.36	Giulia Viola; Italy	15:40.30; PB	Jip Vastenburg; Netherlands	15:40.74
3000 m steeplechase	Charlotta Fougberg; Sweden	9:35.92	Antje Möldner-Schmidt; Germany	9:40.21	Katarzyna Kowalska; Poland	9:41.78
100 m hurdles	Cindy Billaud; France	12.66; CR	Nadine Hildebrand; Germany	12.80; PB	Yuliya Kondakova; Russia	12.86; SB
400 m hurdles	Hanna Ryzhykova; Ukraine	55.00; SB	Eilidh Child; Great Britain	55.36	Irina Davydova; Russia	55.79
4 × 100 m	Naomi Sedney; Dafne Schippers; Tessa van Schagen; Jamile Samuel; Netherlands	42.95	Céline Distel-Bonnet; Ayodelé Ikuesan; Jennifer Galais; Stella Akakpo; France	43.19	Marina Panteleyeva; Natalya Rusakova; Yelizaveta Savlinis; Yuliya Chermoshanskaya; Russia	43.45
4 × 400 m	Darya Prystupa; Hanna Ryzhykova; Hrystyna Stuy; Olha Zemlyak; Ukraine	3:27.66	Esther Cremer; Lena Schmidt; Lara Hoffmann; Ruth Sophia Spelmeyer; Germany	3:28.34	Elea-Mariama Diarra; Agnès Raharolahy; Estelle Perrossier; Floria Gueï; France	3:28.35
High jump	Mariya Kuchina; Russia	1.95	Oksana Okuneva; Ukraine	1.95	Ruth Beitia; Spain; Kamila Lićwinko; Poland	1.90
Pole vault	Anzhelika Sidorova; Russia	4.65 =EL	Jiřina Svobodová; Czech Republic	4.60; SB	Katharina Bauer; Germany	4.40
Long jump	Malaika Mihambo; Germany	6.90; CR	Éloyse Lesueur; France	6.87	Erica Jarder; Sweden	6.67
Triple jump	Yekaterina Koneva; Russia	14.55	Olha Saladukha; Ukraine	14.33; SB	Jenny Elbe; Germany	14.01
Shot put	Christina Schwanitz; Germany	19.43	Irina Tarasova; Russia	18.36	Chiara Rosa; Italy	17.92; SB
Discus	Mélina Robert-Michon; France	65.51; SB	Shanice Craft; Germany	65.07	Yekaterina Strokova; Russia	63.97
Hammer	Betty Heidler; Germany	74.63	Joanna Fiodorow; Poland	72.23	Sophie Hitchon; Great Britain	69.23
Javelin	Barbora Špotáková; Czech Republic	65.57	Hanna Hatsko-Fedusova; Ukraine	63.01; PB	Linda Stahl; Germany	61.58
WR world record | AR area record | CR championship record | GR games record | NR national record | OR Olympic record | PB personal best | SB season best | WL world leading (in a given season)

=== Score table ===
Event		CZE	FRA	GER	GBR	ITA	NED	POL	RUS	ESP	SWE	TUR	UKR
100 metres	M	3	12	4	11	5	7	6	2	8	1	10	9
100 metres	W	8	12	10	7	5	11	3	4	2	6	1	9
200 metres	M	4	0	8	10	7	0	12	5	6	3	11	9
200 metres	W	4	9	7	10	3	12	5	6	2	8	1	11
400 metres	M	2	12	7	10	8	6	9	11	1	3	5	4
400 metres	W	3	8	11	6	9	5	4	12	7	2	1	10
800 metres	M	6	9	12	2	10	7	11	3	8	5	1	4
800 metres	W	5	11	9	6	3	2	7	12	8	4	1	10
1500 metres	M	12	9	11	8	1	2	10	3	5	4	7	6
1500 metres	W	5	3	2	8	9	6	7	11	4	12	1	10
3000 metres	M	11	8	12	9	6	7	3	2	10	1	5	4
3000 metres	W	9	6	5	4	8	12	7	11	10	2	3	0
5000 metres	M	1	6	12	7	3	5	8	9	11	4	10	2
5000 metres	W	3	7	4	9	11	10	6	8	5	12	0	2
3000 metre steeplechase	M	2	12	11	8	9	1	6	10	5	4	3	7
3000 metre steeplechase	W	2	7	11	6	4	1	10	8	9	12	5	3
110/100 metre hurdles	M	2	10	9	11	4	7	6	12	5	8	1	3
110/100 metre hurdles	W	4	12	11	5	6	8	7	10	2	3	1	9
400 metre hurdles	M	4	9	11	10	7	5	8	12	2	3	1	6
400 metre hurdles	W	9	4	8	11	6	1	7	10	5	3	2	12
4 × 100 metres relay	M	3	0	11	12	10	9	8	5	4	6	2	7
4 × 100 metres relay	W	4	11	7	8	5	12	6	10	0	3	2	9
4 × 400 metres relay	M	4	11	10	9	0	7	8	12	5	2	3	6
4 × 400 metres relay	W	4	10	11	9	7	5	8	6	0	3	2	12
High jump	M	10	6	4	7.5	9	3	7.5	11	1	5	2	12
High jump	W	7	1	8	2	4	5.5	9.5	12	9.5	3	5.5	11
Pole vault	M	10.5	12	9	0	5	0	8	10.5	7	0	0	6
Pole vault	W	11	9	10	4	5.5	5.5	0	12	8	7	3	0
Long jump	M	5	4	12	11	1	6	9	7	10	8	2	3
Long jump	W	2	11	12	5	9	4	6	0	8	10	3	7
Triple jump	M	2	5	3	9	11	1	8	12	7	6	4	10
Triple jump	W	7	5	10	6	3	1	9	12	4	8	2	11
Shot put	M	7	6	12	5	2	4	11	10	9	8	3	1
Shot put	W	2	8	12	1	10	6	4	11	7	3	5	9
Discus throw	M	7	1	12	5	6	9	11	10	8	2	3	4
Discus throw	W	6	12	11	5	3	1	9	10	7	4	2	8
Hammer throw	M	4	0	10	9	7	2	11	12	3	8	5	6
Hammer throw	W	5	6	12	10	9	3	11	0	7	8	2	4
Javelin throw	M	5	1	12	4	9	3	6	11	2	8	7	10
Javelin throw	W	12	1	10	6	4	3	5	9	7	8	2	11
Country		CZE	FRA	GER	GBR	ITA	NED	POL	RUS	ESP	SWE	TUR	UKR
Total		212.5	286	373	285.5	243.5	205	297	343.5	224.5	215	128.5	277

=== Final standings ===
Pos	Country	Pts	Note
1	Germany	373	Gold Medalist
2	Russia	331.5	Silver Medalist
3	Poland	298	Bronze Medalist
4	France	287	
5	Great Britain	286.5	
6	Ukraine	277	
7	Italy	251.5	
8	Spain	224.5	
9	Sweden	215	
10	Czech Republic	212.5	Relegated to 2015 First League
11	Netherlands	205	Relegated to 2015 First League
12	Turkey	128.5	Relegated to 2015 First League

== First League ==
Place: Kadriorg Stadium, Tallinn, Estonia

=== Participating countries ===
Belarus
Belgium
Estonia
Finland
Greece
Hungary

Ireland
Lithuania
Norway
Portugal
Romania
Slovenia

=== Men's events ===
Event	Gold		Silver		Bronze	
100 m	Jaysuma Saidy Ndure; Norway	10.12	Lykourgos-Stefanos Tsakonas; Greece	10.22	Rytis Sakalauskas; Lithuania	10.23
200 m	Jaysuma Saidy Ndure; Norway	20.70	Lykourgos-Stefanos Tsakonas; Greece	20.78	Marek Niit; Estonia	20.99; SB
400 m	Brian Gregan; Ireland	46.54	Julien Watrin; Belgium	46.57	Karsten Warholm; Norway	47.58
800 m	Mark English; Ireland	1:47.63	Tamás Kazi; Hungary	1:48.42	Žan Rudolf; Slovenia	1:48.64; SB
1500 m	Paul Robinson; Ireland	3:51.05	Cristian Vorovenci; Romania	3:51.58	Andreas Dimitrakis; Greece	3:51.74
3000 m	Henrik Ingebrigtsen; Norway	8:16.00; SB	Tiidrek Nurme; Estonia	8:17.49	Bashir Abdi; Belgium	8:17.97
5000 m	Tiidrek Nurme; Estonia	14:14.92; SB	Koen Naert; Belgium	14:16.51	Kevin Batta; Ireland	14:17.35
3000 m steeplechase	Justinas Beržanskis; Lithuania	8:48.49	Janne Ukonmaanaho; Finland	8:48.84	Tom Erling Karbo; Norway	8:49.39
110 m hurdles	Balázs Baji; Hungary	13.51	Konstadinos Douvalidis; Greece	13.56	Ben Reynolds; Ireland	13.82
400 m hurdles	Thomas Barr; Ireland	49.30	Rasmus Mägi; Estonia	49.48	Tim Rummens; Belgium	51.04
4 × 100 m	Pedro Bernardo; Francis Obikwelu; Arnaldo Abrantes; Yazaldes Nascimento; Portugal	39.60	Mikk Mihkel Nurges; Rait Veesalu; Markus Ellisaar; Marek Niit; Estonia	39.93	Kristoffer Buhagen; Amund Hoie Sjursen; Even Pettersen; Jaysuma Saidy Ndure; Norway	39.97
4 × 400 m	Julien Watrin; Dylan Borlée; Jonathan Borlée; Kevin Borlée; Belgium	3:04.93	Craig Lynch; Brian Murphy; Thomas Barr; Brian Gregan; Ireland	3:05.40	Aliaksandr Krasousky; Mikita Yakauleu; Maksim Lipauka; Aleksandr Linnik; Belarus	3:09.00
High jump	Mihai Donisan; Romania	2.26	Andrei Churyla; Belarus	2.23	Raivydas Stanys; Lithuania	2.19
Pole vault	Arnaud Art; Belgium	5.42; PB	Edi Maia; Portugal	5.42	Konstadinos Filippidis; Greece	5.30
Long jump	Louis Tsatoumas; Greece	8.25	Tomas Vitonis; Lithuania	7.99	Kristian Pulli; Finland	7.88; PB
Triple jump	Marian Oprea; Romania	16.68 =SB	Dzmitry Platnitski; Belarus	16.28; SB	Dimitrios Tsiamis; Greece	16.20
Shot put	Pavel Lyzhyn; Belarus	19.74	Andrei Gag; Romania	19.64; PB	Marco Fortes; Portugal	19.50
Discus	Andrius Gudžius; Lithuania	61.92	Philip Milanov; Belgium	61.47	Gerd Kanter; Estonia	61.33
Hammer	Krisztián Pars; Hungary	75.26	Primož Kozmus; Slovenia	73.02; SB	David Söderberg; Finland	70.81
Javelin	Antti Ruuskanen; Finland	79.62	Matija Kranjc; Slovenia	78.61; SB	Spiridon Lebesis; Greece	75.86
WR world record | AR area record | CR championship record | GR games record | NR national record | OR Olympic record | PB personal best | SB season best | WL world leading (in a given season)

=== Women's events ===
Event	Gold		Silver		Bronze	
100 m	Ezinne Okparaebo; Norway	11.41	Ksenija Balta; Estonia	11.47	Hanna-Maari Latvala; Finland	11.47
200 m	Maria Belibasaki; Greece	23.12; PB	Hanna-Maari Latvala; Finland	23.46	Ksenija Balta; Estonia	23.55
400 m	Agnė Šerkšnienė; Lithuania	52.94; SB	Justien Grillet; Belgium	53.65; PB	Bianca Răzor; Romania	53.70
800 m	Maryna Arzamasava; Belarus	2:00.95	Ingvill Makestad Bovim; Norway	2:02.57	Liina Tšernov; Estonia	2:05.23; PB
1500 m	Ingvill Makestad Bovim; Norway	4:11.07	Laura Crowe; Ireland	4:13.84	Liina Tšernov; Estonia	4:14.20
3000 m	Sara Moreira; Portugal	9:07.14; SB	Monika Juodeškaitė; Lithuania	9:11.58; PB	Dana Elena Loghin; Romania	9:17.38; PB
5000 m	Dulce Felix; Portugal	15:21.32; SB	Fionnuala Britton; Ireland	15:23.37; SB	Volha Mazuronak; Belarus	15:35.44; PB
3000 m steeplechase	Sandra Eriksson; Finland	9:40.36	Maruša Mišmaš; Slovenia	9:40.49; NR PB	Jekaterina Patjuk; Estonia	9:50.15; NR PB
100 m hurdles	Isabelle Pedersen; Norway	13.18	Marina Tomic; Slovenia	13.26	Eline Berings; Belgium	13.35
400 m hurdles	Angela Moroșanu; Romania	56.70	Vera Barbosa; Portugal	57.04	Egle Staisiunaite; Lithuania	57.93; SB
4 × 100 m	Maria Gatou; Yeoryia Kokloni; Andriana Ferra; Maria Belibasaki; Greece	44.38	Olivia Borlée; Sarah Rutjens; Cynthia Bolingo Mbongo; Anne Zagre; Belgium	44.74	Grit Šadeiko; Diana Suumann; Maarja Kalev; Ksenija Balta; Estonia	44.75; NR
4 × 400 m	Bianca Răzor; Alina Andreea Zaizan; Adelina Pastor; Angela Moroșanu; Romania	3:32.83	Eva Misiunaite; Egle Staisiunaite; Modesta Morauskaite; Agne Serksniene; Lithuania	3:33.57	Tara Marie Norum; Trine Mjaland; Benedicte Hauge; Line Kloster; Norway	3:34.23
High jump	Anna Iljuštšenko; Estonia	1.84 =SB	Daniela Stanciu; Romania	1.84	Tonje Angelsen; Norway	1.80
Pole vault	Ekaterini Stefanidi; Greece	4.55	Minna Nikkanen; Finland	4.45; SB	Tina Šutej; Slovenia	4.45
Long jump	Alina Rotaru; Romania	6.62	Volha Sudareva; Belarus	6.47	Nadia Akpana Assa; Norway	6.22
Triple jump	Patrícia Mamona; Portugal	14.26	Natallia Viatkina; Belarus	14.14	Elena Andreea Panturoiu; Romania	13.93
Shot put	Yulia Leantsiuk; Belarus	18.48	Anita Márton; Hungary	17.01	Kätlin Piirimäe; Estonia	15.64
Discus	Zinaida Sendriute; Lithuania	65.83; SB	Irina Rodrigues; Portugal	56.26	Hrisoula Anagnostopoulou; Greece	55.75
Hammer	Bianca Perie; Romania	71.93; SB	Alena Krechyk; Belarus	66.77	Merja Korpela; Finland	65.36
Javelin	Tatsiana Khaladovich; Belarus	58.33	Martina Ratej; Slovenia	55.66	Nicoleta Madalina Anghelescu; Romania	54.79
WR world record | AR area record | CR championship record | GR games record | NR national record | OR Olympic record | PB personal best | SB season best | WL world leading (in a given season)

=== Score table ===
Event		BLR	BEL	EST	FIN	GRE	HUN	IRL	LTU	NOR	POR	ROU	SLO
100 metres	M	5.5	1	9	7	11	3	4	10	12	8	5.5	2
100 metres	W	4	3	11	10	7.5	1	7.5	6	12	1	9	5
200 metres	M	9	7.5	10	7.5	11	5	6	0	12	4	3	2
200 metres	W	4	5	10	11	12	7	9	1	6	3	8	2
400 metres	M	7	11	2	6	8	3	12	5	10	0	4	9
400 metres	W	8	11	2	7	6	4	3	12	5	9	10	0
800 metres	M	3	6	1	4	5	11	12	2	7	8	9	10
800 metres	W	12	6	10	7	5	1	8	4	11	9	3	2
1500 metres	M	7	9	1	5	10	2	12	6	8	3	11	4
1500 metres	W	7	5	10	4	8	1	11	2	12	3	6	9
3000 metres	M	8	10	11	7	5	4	9	1	12	6	3	2
3000 metres	W	4	5	1	6	8	7	9	11	3	12	10	2
5000 metres	M	6	11	12	4	5	3	10	2	9	8	7	1
5000 metres	W	10	8	6	2	1	7	11	5	4	12	3	9
3000 metre steeplechase	M	7	3	8	11	0	2	9	12	10	5	6	4
3000 metre steeplechase	W	4	2	10	12	5	6	9	1	3	8	7	11
110/100 metre hurdles	M	7	0	5	6	11	12	10	2	8	9	3	4
110/100 metre hurdles	W	2	10	8	4	6	7	9	3	12	1	5	11
400 metre hurdles	M	7	10	11	5	6	8	12	2	9	0	3	4
400 metre hurdles	W	7	8	2	5	4	1	7	10	6	11	12	3
4 × 100 metres relay	M	7	3	11	8	5	2	6	9	10	12	4	1
4 × 100 metres relay	W	2	11	10	9	12	3	8	4	5	1	6	7
4 × 400 metres relay	M	10	12	8	7	4	3	11	1	9	6	2	5
4 × 400 metres relay	W	9	8	2	6	4	3	5	11	10	7	12	1
High jump	M	11	5.5	3	8.5	5.5	3	1	10	7	8.5	12	3
High jump	W	8	6	12	3	5	7	2	9	10	1	11	4
Pole vault	M	9	12	6	8	10	4	2	0	5	11	3	7
Pole vault	W	7	0	8.5	11	12	4	8.5	3	6	5	2	10
Long jump	M	6	8	2	10	12	4	3	11	7	5	9	1
Long jump	W	11	1	6	4	3	5	2	7	10	9	12	8
Triple jump	M	1	11	7	8	10	3	2	4	5	9	12	6
Triple jump	W	11	5	1	9	4	2	3	8	6	12	10	7
Shot put	M	12	4	8	7	2	5	1	9	3	10	11	6
Shot put	W	12	9	10	6	7	11	4	2	5	3	8	1
Discus throw	M	11	5	10	9	6	8	2	12	7	1	3	4
Discus throw	W	7	3	5	9	10	8	2	12	4	11	6	1
Hammer throw	M	7	0	3	10	8	12	5	2	9	6	4	11
Hammer throw	W	11	9	5	10	7	4	3	2	0	6	12	8
Javelin throw	M	7	3	9	12	10	2	1	6	8	4	5	11
Javelin throw	W	12	5	9	7	6	3	2	8	4	1	10	11
Country		BLR	BEL	EST	FIN	GRE	HUN	IRL	LTU	NOR	POR	ROU	SLO
Total		302.5	251	275.5	290.5	276.5	191	253.5	227	300	251.5	281.5	209.5

=== Final standings ===
Pos	Country	Pts	Note
1	Belarus	302.5	Promoted to 2015 Super League
2	Norway	300	Promoted to 2015 Super League
3	Finland	290.5	Promoted to 2015 Super League
4	Romania	281.5	
5	Greece	276.5	
6	Estonia	275.5	
7	Ireland	253.5	
8	Portugal	251.5	
9	Belgium	251	
10	Lithuania	227	
11	Slovenia	209.5	Relegated to 2015 Second League
12	Hungary	191	Relegated to 2015 Second League

== Second League ==
Place: Daugava Stadium, Riga, Latvia.

=== Participating countries ===
Austria
Bulgaria
Croatia
Denmark

Latvia
Serbia
Slovakia
Switzerland

=== Men's events ===
Event	Gold		Silver		Bronze	
100 m	Pascal Mancini; Switzerland	10.52	Denis Dimitrov; Bulgaria	10.55	Jānis Mezītis; Latvia	10.75
200 m	Alex Wilson; Switzerland	20.93	Nick Ekelund-Arenander; Denmark	21.11	Petar Kremenski; Bulgaria	21.22
400 m	Nick Ekelund-Arenander; Denmark	46.12	Miloš Raović; Serbia	46.40	Mateo Ružic; Croatia	47.26
800 m	Jozef Repčik; Slovakia	1:51.77	Nikolaus Franzmair; Austria	1:51.78	Andreas Bube; Denmark	1:52.02
1500 m	Andreas Vojta; Austria	3:45.86	Dmitrijs Jurkevičs; Latvia	3:46.65	Goran Nava; Serbia	3:46.65
3000 m	Dmitrijs Jurkevičs; Latvia	8:18.71	Brenton Rowe; Austria	8:19.32	Thijs Nijhuis; Denmark	8:22.64; PB
5000 m	Brenton Rowe; Austria	14:19.11	Abdi Hakin Ulad; Denmark	14:22.90	Iolo Nikolov; Bulgaria	14:29.02; PB
3000 m steeplechase	Mitko Tsenov; Bulgaria	8:45.55	Ole Hesselbjerg; Denmark	8:47.55	Christian Steinhammer; Austria	8:53.14
110 m hurdles	Milan Ristić; Serbia	13.80	Viliam Papšo; Slovakia	13.88	Tobias Furer; Switzerland	13.88; SB
400 m hurdles	Emir Bekrić; Serbia	49.64; SB	Kariem Hussein; Switzerland	50.14	Jānis Baltušs; Latvia	51.07
4 × 100 m	Pascal Mancini; Reto Schenkel; Steven Gugerli; Alex Wilson; Switzerland	39.60	Jānis Mezītis; Sandis Sabājevs; Vladimirs Mihailovs; Elvijs Misāns; Latvia	40.40	Festus Asante; Morten Madsen; Mike Kalisz; Frederik Schou-Nielsen; Denmark	40.44
4 × 400 m	Nicolai Hartling; Andreas Bube; Nicklas Hyde; Nick Ekelund-Arenander; Denmark	3:07.57	Josip Šakic; Mateo Kovačić; Yann Eldi Senjarin; Mateo Ružic; Croatia	3:08.43	Nemanja Božić; Miloš Raović; Dino Dodig; Emir Bekrić; Serbia	3:08.54
High jump	Lukáš Beer; Slovakia	2.22	Viktor Ninov; Bulgaria	2.14	Miloš Todosijević; Serbia	2.10
Pole vault	Mareks Ārents; Latvia; Mikkel M. Nielsen; Denmark	5.30			Ivan Horvat; Croatia	5.20
Long jump	Elvijs Misāns; Latvia	8.05; PB	Yves Zellweger; Switzerland	7.66	Denis Eradiri; Bulgaria	7.50
Triple jump	Rumen Dimitrov; Bulgaria	16.77	Peder P. Nielsen; Denmark	16.29	Tomáš Veszelka; Slovakia	15.67
Shot put	Asmir Kolašinac; Serbia	20.15; SB	Georgi Ivanov; Bulgaria	19.79	Māris Urtāns; Latvia	19.76
Discus	Gerhard Mayer; Austria	59.34	Roland Varga; Croatia	59.28	Rosen Karamfilov; Bulgaria	52.92
Hammer	Marcel Lomnický; Slovakia	75.69	Mirko Mičuda; Croatia	67.30	Igors Sokolovs; Latvia	66.90
Javelin	Rolands Štrobinders; Latvia	78.32	Patrik Ženúch; Slovakia	73.46	Vedran Samac; Serbia	71.84
WR world record | AR area record | CR championship record | GR games record | NR national record | OR Olympic record | PB personal best | SB season best | WL world leading (in a given season)

=== Women's events ===
Event	Gold		Silver		Bronze	
100 m	Ivet Lalova; Bulgaria	11.34	Mujinga Kambundji; Switzerland	11.53	Ivana Španović; Serbia	11.94
200 m	Ivet Lalova; Bulgaria	22.92	Léa Sprunger; Switzerland	23.41	Gunta Latiševa-Čudare; Latvia	23.94
400 m	Gunta Latiševa-Čudare; Latvia	53.69; SB	Iveta Putalová; Slovakia	53.82; SB	Anita Banović; Croatia	54.04
800 m	Vania Stambolova; Bulgaria	2:01.41; PB	Selina Büchel; Switzerland	2:04.01	Amela Terzić; Serbia	2:05.24; SB
1500 m	Amela Terzić; Serbia	4:28.99	Agata Strausa; Latvia	4:31.84	Maria Larsen; Denmark	4:32.35
3000 m	Amela Terzić; Serbia	9:11.64; SB	Fabienne Schlumpf; Switzerland	9:14.89	Jennifer Wenth; Austria	9:16.75; SB
5000 m	Fabienne Schlumpf; Switzerland	15:51.06; PB	Jeļena Prokopčuka; Latvia	15:53.77	Katarína Berešová; Slovakia	16:07.73; PB
3000 m steeplechase	Silvia Danekova; Bulgaria	9:43.13; SB	Poļina Jeļizarova; Latvia	9:52.62	Astrid Leutert; Switzerland	10:01.13
100 m hurdles	Ivana Lončarek; Croatia	13.18; PB	Lisa Urech; Switzerland	13.35	Laura Ikauniece; Latvia	13.57; SB
400 m hurdles	Petra Fontanive; Switzerland	57.57	Lucie Slaníčková; Slovakia	57.95	Verena Menapace; Austria	59.93
4 × 100 m	Mujinga Kambundji; Fanette Humair; Joëlle Golay; Léa Sprunger; Switzerland	44.27	Karina Okolije; Inna Eftimova; Gabriela Laleva; Ivet Lalova; Bulgaria	44.63	Mateja Jambrovic; Lucija Pokos; Marina Banovic; Ivana Loncarek; Croatia	45.39
4 × 400 m	Teodora Kolarova; Vania Stambolova; Katya Hristova; Maria Dankova; Bulgaria	3:37.04	Dora Filipovic; Kristina Dudek; Marina Banovic; Anita Banovic; Croatia	3:37.91	Simone Werner; Valentine Arrieta; Robine Schürmann; Petra Fontanive; Switzerland	3:38.95
High jump	Ana Šimić; Croatia	1.92	Venelina Veneva-Mateeva; Bulgaria	1.85	Giovanna Demo; Switzerland; Madara Onuzane; Latvia	1.80
Pole vault	Caroline Bonde Holm; Denmark	4.35; SB	Nicole Büchler; Switzerland	4.30	Kira Grünberg; Austria	4.25; PB
Long jump	Ivana Španović; Serbia	6.58	Aiga Grabuste; Latvia	6.56	Irène Pusterla; Switzerland	6.46
Triple jump	Ivana Španović; Serbia	13.50	Jana Velďáková; Slovakia	13.27	Mariya Dimitrova; Bulgaria	13.08
Shot put	Radoslava Mavrodieva; Bulgaria	17.80; SB	Maria Sløk Hansen; Denmark	15.01	Sandra Perković; Croatia	14.27
Discus	Sandra Perković; Croatia	64.05	Dragana Tomašević; Serbia	58.75	Katrine Bebe; Denmark	50.97
Hammer	Martina Hrašnová; Slovakia	71.30	Sara Savatović; Serbia	60.35	Nicole Zihlmann; Switzerland	59.50
Javelin	Tatjana Jelača; Serbia	61.19	Madara Palameika; Latvia	59.54	Sara Kolak; Croatia	56.90
WR world record | AR area record | CR championship record | GR games record | NR national record | OR Olympic record | PB personal best | SB season best | WL world leading (in a given season)

=== Score table ===
Event		AUT	BUL	CRO	DEN	LAT	SRB	SVK	SUI
100 metres	M	3	7	5	0	6	2	4	8
100 metres	W	1	8	4	2	3	6	5	7
200 metres	M	2	6	1	7	5	3	4	8
200 metres	W	1	8	5	2	6	4	3	7
400 metres	M	1	5	6	8	3	7	2	4
400 metres	W	2	4	6	1	8	5	7	3
800 metres	M	7	1	3	6	4	5	8	2
800 metres	W	4	8	2	1	5	6	3	7
1500 metres	M	8	4	1	5	7	6	2	3
1500 metres	W	4	1	2	6	7	8	5	3
3000 metres	M	7	4	5	6	8	3	2	0
3000 metres	W	6	5	4	3	1	8	2	7
5000 metres	M	8	6	1	7	5	2	3	4
5000 metres	W	2	5	3	4	7	1	6	8
3000 metre steeplechase	M	6	8	1	7	4	3	2	5
3000 metre steeplechase	W	3	8	2	5	7	4	1	6
110/100 metre hurdles	M	3	2	1	5	4	8	7	6
110/100 metre hurdles	W	5	2	8	1	6	4	3	7
400 metre hurdles	M	5	2	3	4	6	8	1	7
400 metre hurdles	W	6	4	5	3	1	2	7	8
4 × 100 metres relay	M	4	3	5	6	7	2	1	8
4 × 100 metres relay	W	3	7	6	1	2	4	5	8
4 × 400 metres relay	M	1	2	7	8	3	6	4	5
4 × 400 metres relay	W	3	8	7	4	5	0	0	6
High jump	M	1	7	4.5	4.5	2.5	6	8	2.5
High jump	W	4	7	8	3	5.5	2	1	5.5
Pole vault	M	3	2	6	7.5	7.5	1	4	5
Pole vault	W	6	1	3.5	8	5	2	3.5	7
Long jump	M	2	6	1	4	8	3	5	7
Long jump	W	1	2	3	5	7	8	4	6
Triple jump	M	4	8	1	7	5	2	6	3
Triple jump	W	1	6	4	3	5	8	7	2
Shot put	M	3	7	5	2	6	8	4	1
Shot put	W	4	8	6	7	3	5	1	2
Discus throw	M	8	6	7	3	2	4	1	5
Discus throw	W	1	2	8	6	5	7	3	4
Hammer throw	M	0	5	7	3	6	2	8	4
Hammer throw	W	2	1	3	5	4	7	8	6
Javelin throw	M	4	3	2	1	8	6	7	5
Javelin throw	W	5	3	6	2	7	8	1	4
Country		AUT	BUL	CRO	DEN	LAT	SRB	SVK	SUI
Total		144	191	173	168	206.5	185	157.5	210

=== Final standings ===
Pos	Country	Pts	Note
1	Switzerland	210	Promoted to 2015 First League
2	Latvia	206.5	Promoted to 2015 First League
3	Bulgaria	191	
4	Serbia	185	
5	Denmark	173	
6	Croatia	168	
7	Slovakia	157.5	Relegated to 2015 Third League
8	Austria	144	Relegated to 2015 Third League

== Third League ==
Place: – Dinamo Arena, Tbilisi, Georgia.

=== Participating countries ===
Athletic Association of Small States of Europe
(Gibraltar, Liechtenstein, Monaco, San Marino)
Albania
Andorra
Armenia
Azerbaijan
Bosnia and Herzegovina
Cyprus

Georgia
Iceland
Israel
Luxembourg
Macedonia
Malta
Moldova
Montenegro

=== Men's events ===
Event	Gold		Silver		Bronze	
100 m	Panayiotis Ioannou; Cyprus	10.69	Luka Rakić; Montenegro	10.72	Bachana Khorava; Georgia	10.75
200 m	Kevin Moore; Malta	21.06	Emri Persiado; Israel	21.33	Kolbeinn Höður Gunnarsson; Iceland	21.37
400 m	Donald Sanford; Israel	46.38	Nika Kartavtsev; Georgia	47.82	Alexandru Babian; Moldova	47.83
800 m	Amel Tuka; Bosnia and Herzegovina	1:49.81	Mokat Petna; Israel	1:50.42	Theofanis Michaelas; Cyprus	1:50.60
1500 m	Amine Khadiri; Cyprus	3:48.05	Ion Siuris; Moldova	3:49.25	Yimer Getahun; Israel	3:49.98
3000 m	Hayle Ibrahimov; Azerbaijan	8:02.86	Amine Khadiri; Cyprus	8:20.38	Roman Prodius; Moldova	8:23.22
5000 m	Hayle Ibrahimov; Azerbaijan	14:00.24	Aimeru Almeya; Israel	14:35.04	Kári Steinn Karlsson; Iceland	14:55.02
3000 m steeplechase	Noam Ne'eman; Israel	9:08.27	Osman Junuzović; Bosnia and Herzegovina	9:10.40	Nicolai Gorbușco; Moldova	9:11.06
110 m hurdles	Milan Trajkovic; Cyprus	13.94	David Ilariani; Georgia	13.96	Rahib Məmmədov; Azerbaijan	14.18
400 m hurdles	Alexei Cravcenco; Moldova	51.98	Minas Alozidis; Cyprus	52.02	Jacques Frisch; Luxembourg	52.34
4 × 100 m	Israel; Asaf Malka; Amir Dayi; Amit Cohen; Emri Persiado	40.50	Iceland; Joan Ramón Borges Bosque; Jóhann Björn Sigurbjörnsson; Kolbeinn Höður Gunnarsson; Ari Bragi Kárason	40.84	Azerbaijan; Karman Asqepox; Hanim Ibrahimov; Valentin Bulichev; Rahib Məmmədov	41.35
4 × 400 m	Iceland; Kolbeinn Höður Gunnarsson; Ívar Kristinn Jasonarson; Einar Daði Lárusson; Trausti Stefánsson	3:11.74	Israel; Itai Shamir; Donald Sanford; Imokat Petena; Maor Seged	3:11.76	Georgia; Soso Gogodze; Denis Zhvania; Endrik Zilbershtein; Nika Kartavtsevi	3:13.67
High jump	Eugenio Rossi; AASSE (San Marino)	2.24 NR	Niki Palli; Israel; Vasilios Konstantinou; Cyprus	2.14		
Pole vault	Nikandros Stylianou; Cyprus	5.45	Lev Skorish; Israel	5.05	Mark Johnson; Iceland	4.65
Long jump	Kristinn Torfason; Iceland	7.62	Izmir Smajlaj; Albania	7.58	Christodoulos Theofilou; Cyprus	7.36
Triple jump	Vladimir Letnicov; Moldova	16.38	Levon Aghasyan; Armenia	16.13	Nazim Babayev; Azerbaijan	15.82
Shot put	Kemal Mešić; Bosnia and Herzegovina	18.48	Bob Bertemes; Luxembourg	18.26	Ivan Emilianov; Moldova	18.04
Discus	Danijel Furtula; Montenegro	61.92	Apostolos Parellis; Cyprus	61.80	Nicolai Ceban; Moldova	54.85
Hammer	Sergiu Marghiev; Moldova	76.02	Konstantinos Stathelakos; Cyprus	67.71	Hilmar Örn Jónsson; Iceland	65.88
Javelin	Guðmundur Sverrisson; Iceland	73.13	Rostom Chincharauli; Georgia	70.57	Andrian Mardare; Moldova	69.11
WR world record | AR area record | CR championship record | GR games record | NR national record | OR Olympic record | PB personal best | SB season best | WL world leading (in a given season)

=== Women's events ===
Event	Gold		Silver		Bronze	
100 m	Ramona Papaioannou; Cyprus	11.45	Tiffany Tshilumba; Luxembourg	11.65	Hrafnhild Eir Hermodsdottir; Iceland	11.82
200 m	Eleni Artymata; Cyprus	24.13	Hrafnhild Eir Hermodsdottir; Iceland	24.31	Tiffany Tshilumba; Luxembourg	24.42
400 m	Janet Richard; Malta	54.84	Hafdis Sigurdardottir; Iceland	55.07	Adila Mamadli; Azerbaijan	56.14
800 m	Luiza Gega; Albania	2:01.31	Anita Hinriksdottir; Iceland	2:02.70	Charline Mathias; Luxembourg	2:05.96
1500 m	Luiza Gega; Albania	4:08.58	Anita Hinriksdottir; Iceland	4:18.49	Behafeta Hadiyes; Azerbaijan	4:26.50
3000 m	Behafeta Hadiyes; Azerbaijan	9:38.8	Slađana Perunović; Montenegro	9:48.5	Maor Tyuri; Israel	10:01.8
5000 m	Hayelom Maeregu; Azerbaijan	16:42.46	Slađana Perunović; Montenegro	17:07.71	Azaunt Taka; Israel	17:22.82
3000 m steeplechase	Rahima Zukić; Bosnia and Herzegovina	11:08.59	Megal Atias; Israel	11:30.13	Giuli Dekanadze; Georgia	12:04.78
100 m hurdles	Dimitra Arachoviti; Cyprus	13.68	Kristin Olafsdottir-Johnson; Iceland	14.14	Anna Berghii; Moldova	14.29
400 m hurdles	Anna Berghii; Moldova	58.99	Kristin Olafsdottir-Johnson; Iceland	59.55	Gorana Cvejetic; Bosnia and Herzegovina	1:03.47
4 × 100 m	Olivia Fotopovlov; Ramona Papaloannov; Andreov Paraskevi; Eleni Artunata; Cyprus	45.11	Björg Gunnarsdóttir; Hrafnhild Eir Hermóðsdóttir; Steinunn Erla Davíðsdóttir; Hafdís Sigurðardóttir; Iceland	46.44	Rachel Fitz; Diane Borg; Rebecca Sare; Rebecca Camilleri; Malta	46.88
4 × 400 m	Kristin Olafsdottir-Johnson; Björg Gunnarsdottir; Anita Hinriksdottir; Hafids Sigurdardottir; Iceland	3:40.42	Iliana Bulieva; Iulia Tsasieva; Olesia Cojucari; Anna Berghii; Moldova	3:47.84	Kaliopi Kountouri; Papaskevoula Thrasilvoulou; Christina Katsari; Natalia Evangelidou; Cyprus	3:48.09
High jump	Ma'ayan Shahaf; Israel	1.85	Elodie Tshilumba; Luxembourg	1.79	Marija Vuković; Montenegro	1.76
Pole vault	Yelena Gladkova; Azerbaijan	3.60	Maria Aristotelous; Cyprus	3.60	Arna Ýr Jónsdóttir; Iceland	3.50
Long jump	Hafdis Sigurdardottir; Iceland	6.41; NR	Rebecca Camilleri; Malta	6.25	Satenik Hovhannisyan; Armenia	6.06
Triple jump	Hanna Knyazyeva-Minenko; Israel	13.73	Hafdis Sigurdardottir; Iceland	13.04	Yekaterina Sariyeva; Azerbaijan	13.02
Shot put	Florentia Kappa; Cyprus	14.82	Ásdís Hjálmsdóttir; Iceland	14.24	Dimitriana Surdu; Moldova	13.73
Discus	Androniki Lada; Cyprus	54.18	Kristina Rakocevic; Montenegro	47.22	Dimitriana Surdu; Moldova	46.33
Hammer	Paraskevi Theodorou; Cyprus	59.49	Yevgeniya Zabolotniy; Israel	52.51	Vigdis Jonsdottir; Iceland	52.12
Javelin	Mihaela Tacu; Moldova	54.37	Ásdís Hjálmsdóttir; Iceland	54.07	Renalda Nastastsissiou; Cyprus	51.83
WR world record | AR area record | CR championship record | GR games record | NR national record | OR Olympic record | PB personal best | SB season best | WL world leading (in a given season)

=== Score table ===
Event		AAS	ALB	AND	ARM	AZE	BIH	CYP	GEO	ISL	ISR	LUX	MKD	MLT	MDA	MNE
100 metres	M	3	4	5	2	7	11	15	13	12	10	8	0	6	9	14
100 metres	W	1	5	8	11	4	7	15	3	13	10	14	2	12	9	6
200 metres	M	1	4	2	3	5	6	12	10	13	14	7	8	15	11	9
200 metres	W	2	3	1	11	5	7	15	6	14	10	13	4	12	8	9
400 metres	M	4	10	1	6	9	7	11	14	12	15	2	8	5	13	3
400 metres	W	5	4	3	8	13	1	10	2	14	11	9	6	15	12	7
800 metres	M	1	12	3	7	6	15	13	9	10	14	5	8	4	11	2
800 metres	W	4	15	3	6	9	8	12	7	14	10	13	1	5	11	2
1500 metres	M	4	11	0	10	5	12	15	7	0	13	9	6	8	14	0
1500 metres	W	4	15	3	6	13	8	12	9	14	10	5	1	7	11	2
3000 metres	M	2	0	6	7	15	8	14	9	11	12	10	4	5	13	3
3000 metres	W	0	0	6	7	15	0	10	5	12	13	8	4	9	11	14
5000 metres	M	7	0	0	0	15	10	8	9	13	14	12	0	0	11	6
5000 metres	W	3	0	5	4	15	7	11	6	12	13	10	0	8	9	14
3000 metre steeplechase	M	0	12	5	4	6	14	11	10	9	15	7	2	8	13	3
3000 metre steeplechase	W	0	0	0	7	6	15	12	13	9	14	11	0	10	8	5
110/100 metre hurdles	M	5	6	1	2	13	7	15	14	11	10	12	4	3	8	9
110/100 metre hurdles	W	2	6	5	3	8	12	15	11	14	9	10	4	1	13	7
400 metre hurdles	M	2	4	1	7	12	5	14	9	11	10	13	6	3	15	8
400 metre hurdles	W	4	0	2	5	9	13	8	6	14	12	11	10	3	15	7
4 × 100 metres relay	M	3	4	1	2	13	8	11	6	14	15	7	9	5	12	10
4 × 100 metres relay	W	3	6	2	5	9	7	15	4	14	11	12	8	13	10	1
4 × 400 metres relay	M	2	5	1	7	12	11	9	13	15	14	4	6	8	10	3
4 × 400 metres relay	W	3	6	2	9	8	10	13	5	15	12	11	7	0	14	4
High jump	M	15	0	2	6	11	10	13.5	8.5	7	13.5	5	8.5	3	12	4
High jump	W	8	0	6	4.5	7	12	4.5	3	11	15	14	9	2	10	13
Pole vault	M	8	0	12	0	11	0	15	9	13	14	0	0	0	0	10
Pole vault	W	11	0	8	0	15	0	14	9	13	10	12	0	7	0	0
Long jump	M	8	14	1	6	7	5	13	12	15	10	2	4	3	11	9
Long jump	W	2	4	3	13	5	9	12	7	15	8	11	1	14	10	6
Triple jump	M	5	10	0	14	13	0	12	8	9	11	0	0	6	15	7
Triple jump	W	0	0	0	12	13	0	10	9	14	15	7	0	8	11	0
Shot put	M	2	0	3	7	6	15	9	11	12	10	14	4	5	13	8
Shot put	W	3	0	2	6	9	11	15	10	14	7	12	4	5	13	8
Discus throw	M	1	4	3	10	5	12	14	7	8	9	11	2	6	13	15
Discus throw	W	6	0	2	7	3	12	15	10	11	8	9	4	5	13	14
Hammer throw	M	4	0	8	9	5	0	14	0	13	12	11	6	7	15	10
Hammer throw	W	4	0	7	6	5	12	15	8	13	14	10	0	3	11	9
Javelin throw	M	3	0	2	6	5	11	10	14	15	12	9	4	8	13	7
Javelin throw	W	6	0	2	3	8	5	13	9	14	12	10	4	7	15	11
Country		AAS	ALB	AND	ARM	AZE	BIH	CYP	GEO	ISL	ISR	LUX	MKD	MLT	MDA	MNE
Total		150	164	126	249.5	363	323	495	334.5	487	471.5	357	162.5	258	446	278

=== Final standings ===
Pos	Country	Pts	Note
1	Cyprus	495	Promoted to 2015 Second League
2	Iceland	487	Promoted to 2015 Second League
3	Israel	471.5	
4	Moldova	446	
5	Azerbaijan	363	
6	Luxembourg	357	
7	Georgia	334.5	
8	Bosnia and Herzegovina	323	
9	Montenegro	278	
10	Malta	258	
11	Armenia	249.5	
12	Albania	164	
13	Macedonia	162.5	
14	AASSE	150	
15	Andorra	126	
