= 2015 World Championships in Athletics – Women's 1500 metres =

Women's 1500 metres at the 2015 World Championships
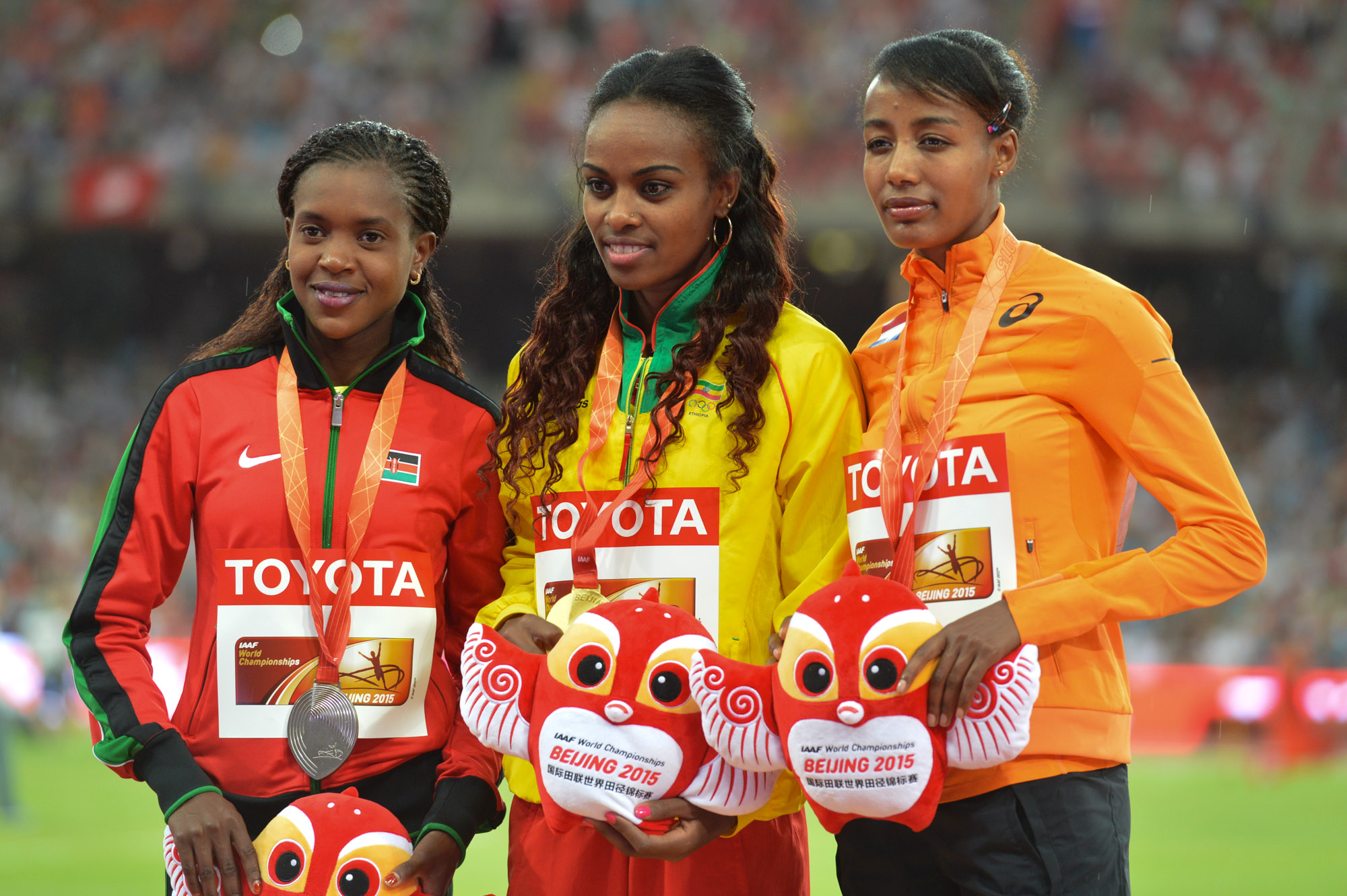
- Venue: Beijing National Stadium
- Dates: 22 August (heats); 23 August (semifinals); 25 August (final)
- Competitors: 35 from 20 nations
- Winning time: 4:08.09

Medalists
gold medal	Genzebe Dibaba	Ethiopia
silver medal	Faith Kipyegon	Kenya
bronze medal	Sifan Hassan	Netherlands

The women's 1500 metres at the 2015 World Championships in Athletics was held at the Beijing National Stadium on 22, 23 and 25 August.

== Summary ==
Abeba Aregawi of Sweden entered as the defending champion, although her preparations that year were hampered by injury. In contrast, the world-leading athlete that season Genzebe Dibaba had broken the long-standing world record for the event the previous month.

The semi-finals were definitely a contrast with the second semi run eight seconds faster than the first, still no favorites were left behind. From the gun in the final, the field seemed to drop back in unison, leaving Americans Shannon Rowbury and Jennifer Simpson out front. With no guidance, the two jogged through a 1:17.06 first lap. As the slow pace continued, the overwhelming favorite Dibaba jogged up to the outside of Simpson's shoulder. With just over 2 laps to go, Dibaba took the lead and turned it into an 800-meter race, her first 100 metres of acceleration bringing the second lap time down to 68.58. Simpson tried to chase but Faith Chepngetich Kipyegon, Aregawi and Dawit Seyaum overtook her chasing Dibaba. Dibaba's penultimate lap was 57.9 with Sifan Hassan moving forward, with Chepngetich, then Seyaum continuing to chase and Aregawi falling back. Hassan passed Chepngetich through the final turn and the battle became for the silver medal. With Dibaba pulling away, Hassan couldn't hold her speed. Drifting to the outside of the lane, she gave space for Chepngetich to move through back into second place. Dibaba slowed as she celebrated crossing the finish line arms raised above her head, still her final 800 metres was 1:57.3, only Eunice Sum had run an 800 metres race that fast in 2015. Even Hassan, who was at the back of the pack when the kick started ran faster than any other woman had run an 800 in 2015 by running a 1:57.6.

== Records ==
Prior to the competition, the records were as follows:

World record	Genzebe Dibaba (ETH)	3:50.07	Fontvieille, Monaco	17 July 2015
Championship record	Tatyana Tomashova (RUS)	3:58.52	Paris, France	31 August 2003
World leading	Genzebe Dibaba (ETH)	3:50.07	Fontvieille, Monaco	17 July 2015
African record	Genzebe Dibaba (ETH)	3:50.07	Fontvieille, Monaco	17 July 2015
Asian record	Qu Yunxia (CHN)	3:50.46	Beijing, China	11 September 1993
NACAC record	Shannon Rowbury (USA)	3:56.29	Fontvieille, Monaco	17 July 2015
South American record	Letitia Vriesde (SUR)	4:05.67	Tokyo, Japan	31 August 1991
European record	Tatyana Kazankina (URS)	3:52.47	Zürich, Switzerland	13 August 1980
Oceanian record	Sarah Jamieson (AUS)	4:00.93	Stockholm, Sweden	25 July 2006

== Qualification standards ==
Entry standards
4:06.50 (mile: 4:25.20)

== Schedule ==
Date	Time	Round
22 August 2015	11:15	Heats
23 August 2015	20:45	Semifinals
25 August 2015	20:35	Final

All times are local times (UTC+8)

== Results ==
=== Heats ===
Qualification: Best 6 (Q) and next 6 fastest (q) qualify for the next round.

Rank	Heat	Name	Nationality	Time	Notes
1	3	Genzebe Dibaba	Ethiopia	4:02.59	Q
2	3	Faith Kipyegon	Kenya	4:02.77	Q
3	3	Rababe Arafi	Morocco	4:04.17	Q
4	1	Besu Sado	Ethiopia	4:05.39	Q
5	1	Laura Muir	Great Britain & N.I.	4:05.53	Q
6	3	Maureen Koster	Netherlands	4:05.55	Q
7	1	Nancy Chepkwemoi	Kenya	4:05.65	Q
8	1	Shannon Rowbury	United States	4:05.66	Q
~~9~~	1	Betlhem Desalegn	United Arab Emirates	~~4:05.73~~	Q, DQ
9	1	Anna Shchagina	Russia	4:05.78	Q
10	1	Lauren Johnson	United States	4:05.79	q
11	1	Malika Akkaoui	Morocco	4:05.85	q
12	1	Renata Pliś	Poland	4:05.89	q
13	3	Amela Terzić	Serbia	4:06.07	Q
14	3	Laura Weightman	Great Britain & N.I.	4:06.13	Q
15	3	Kerri Gallagher	United States	4:06.34	q
16	3	Sofia Ennaoui	Poland	4:06.96	q
17	1	Muriel Coneo	Colombia	4:08.31	q, NR
18	3	Margherita Magnani	Italy	4:09.06	
19	1	Melissa Duncan	Australia	4:09.29	
20	3	Luiza Gega	Albania	4:09.36	
21	2	Sifan Hassan	Netherlands	4:09.52	Q
22	2	Dawit Seyaum	Ethiopia	4:09.64	Q
23	2	Abeba Aregawi	Sweden	4:10.77	Q
24	2	Tatyana Tomashova	Russia	4:10.79	Q
25	2	Jennifer Simpson	United States	4:10.91	Q
26	2	Angelika Cichocka	Poland	4:11.08	Q
27	2	Viola Cheptoo Lagat	Kenya	4:12.15	
28	2	Nicole Sifuentes	Canada	4:12.82	
29	3	Florina Pierdevară	Romania	4:13.76	
30	2	Nikki Hamblin	New Zealand	4:16.65	
31	1	Eliane Saholinirina	Madagascar	4:19.54	SB
32	2	Heidi See	Australia	4:20.65	
33	2	Amina Bakhit	Sudan	4:22.49	SB
	2	Siham Hilali	Morocco	DNF	

=== Semifinals ===
Qualification: First 5 in each heat (Q) and the next 2 fastest (q) advanced to the final.

Rank	Heat	Name	Nationality	Time	Notes
1	2	Genzebe Dibaba	Ethiopia	4:06.74	Q
2	2	Faith Kipyegon	Kenya	4:06.88	Q
3	2	Laura Muir	Great Britain & N.I.	4:07.95	Q
4	2	Rababe Arafi	Morocco	4:08.19	Q
5	2	Jennifer Simpson	United States	4:08.20	Q
6	2	Tatyana Tomashova	Russia	4:08.72	q
7	2	Angelika Cichocka	Poland	4:09.19	q
8	2	Lauren Johnson	United States	4:10.01	
9	2	Maureen Koster	Netherlands	4:10.95	
10	2	Amela Terzić	Serbia	4:13.92	
11	2	Renata Pliś	Poland	4:15.10	
12	1	Sifan Hassan	Netherlands	4:15.38	Q
13	1	Dawit Seyaum	Ethiopia	4:15.46	Q
14	1	Abeba Aregawi	Sweden	4:15.90	Q
15	1	Malika Akkaoui	Morocco	4:16.61	Q
16	1	Shannon Rowbury	United States	4:16.64	Q
17	1	Sofia Ennaoui	Poland	4:16.70	
18	1	Besu Sado	Ethiopia	4:17.17	
19	1	Kerri Gallagher	United States	4:17.63	
20	1	Anna Shchagina	Russia	4:17.82	
~~21~~	1	Betlhem Desalegn	United Arab Emirates	~~4:17.92~~	DQ
21	2	Muriel Coneo	Colombia	4:18.14	
22	1	Nancy Chepkwemoi	Kenya	4:18.15	
	1	Laura Weightman	Great Britain & N.I.	DNS	

=== Final ===
The final was started at 20:35.

Rank	Name	Nationality	Time	Notes
1st place, gold medalist(s)	Genzebe Dibaba	Ethiopia	4:08.09	
2nd place, silver medalist(s)	Faith Kipyegon	Kenya	4:08.96	
3rd place, bronze medalist(s)	Sifan Hassan	Netherlands	4:09.34	
4	Dawit Seyaum	Ethiopia	4:10.26	
5	Laura Muir	Great Britain & N.I.	4:11.48	
6	Abeba Aregawi	Sweden	4:12.16	
7	Shannon Rowbury	United States	4:12.39	
8	Angelika Cichocka	Poland	4:13.22	
9	Rababe Arafi	Morocco	4:13.66	
10	Tatyana Tomashova	Russia	4:14.18	
11	Jennifer Simpson	United States	4:16.28	
12	Malika Akkaoui	Morocco	4:16.98	
