= 2013 European Athletics Indoor Championships – Women's 1500 metres =

The women's 1500 metres event at the 2013 European Athletics Indoor Championships was held on March 1, 2013, at 19:05 (round 1), and March 2, 18:05 (final) local time.

== Records ==
Standing records prior to the 2013 European Athletics Indoor Championships
World record	Yelena Soboleva (RUS)	3:58.28	Moscow, Russia	18 February 2006
European record	Yelena Soboleva (RUS)	3:58.28	Moscow, Russia	18 February 2006
Championship record	Doina Melinte (ROU)	4:02.54	Piraeus, Greece	3 March 1985
World Leading	Abeba Aregawi (SWE)	3:58.40	Stockholm, Sweden	21 February 2013
European Leading	Abeba Aregawi (SWE)	3:58.40	Stockholm, Sweden	21 February 2013

== Results ==
=== Round 1 ===
Qualification: First 2 (Q) or and the 3 fastest athletes (q) advanced to the final.

Rank	Heat	Athlete	Nationality	Time	Note
1	2	Abeba Aregawi	Sweden	4:11.38	Q
2	1	Natalia Rodríguez	Spain	4:12.25	Q
3	1	Laura Muir	Great Britain	4:12.36	Q
~~4~~	2	Natallia Kareiva	Belarus	~~4:12.41~~	Q
4	2	Svetlana Podosenova	Russia	4:12.41	q
5	1	Yelena Soboleva	Russia	4:12.61	q
6	1	Giulia Viola	Italy	4:13.80	q, PB
7	2	Angelika Cichocka	Poland	4:14.00	
8	3	Isabel Macías	Spain	4:14.72	Q
9	3	Katarzyna Broniatowska	Poland	4:14.78	Q
10	3	Anna Shchagina	Russia	4:14.89	
11	1	Poļina Jeļizarova	Latvia	4:15.10	NR
12	3	Claire Tarplee	Ireland	4:15.16	
13	1	Danuta Urbanik	Poland	4:15.29	
14	2	Margherita Magnani	Italy	4:15.85	
15	3	Diana Sujew	Germany	4:17.27	
16	2	Silvia Danekova	Bulgaria	4:17.62	
17	2	Elina Sujew	Germany	4:17.81	
18	3	Charlotte Schönbeck	Sweden	4:18.52	
19	1	Maruša Mišmaš	Slovenia	4:27.45	

=== Final ===
The final was held at 18:05.

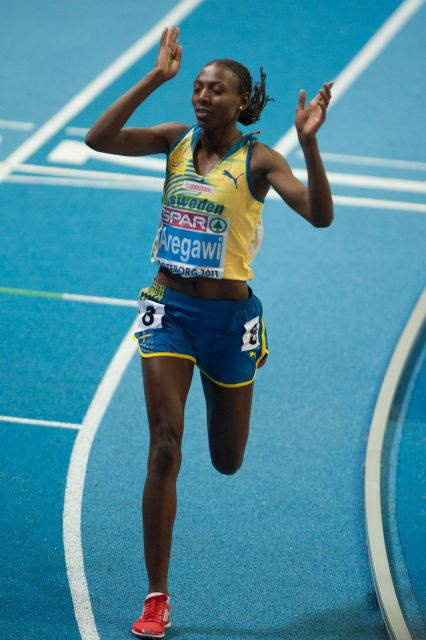
Abeba Aregawi after winning the event.

Rank	Athlete	Nationality	Time	Note
1st place, gold medalist(s)	Abeba Aregawi	Sweden	4:04.47	
2nd place, silver medalist(s)	Isabel Macías	Spain	4:14.19	
3rd place, bronze medalist(s)	Katarzyna Broniatowska	Poland	4:14.30	
~~4~~	Natallia Kareiva	Belarus	~~4:15.15~~	
4	Svetlana Podosenova	Russia	4:16.32	
5	Yelena Soboleva	Russia	4:16.50	
6	Giulia Viola	Italy	4:16.83	
7	Laura Muir	Great Britain	4:18.39	
	Natalia Rodriguez	Spain	DNS	
