= 2013 European Athletics U23 Championships – Women's 1500 metres =

The Women's 1500 metres event at the 2013 European Athletics U23 Championships was held in Tampere, Finland, at Ratina Stadium on 13 and 14 July.

== Medalists ==
| Gold | Amela Terzić; Serbia |
| Silver | Corinna Harrer; Germany |
| Bronze | Laura Muir; United Kingdom |

== Results ==
=== Final ===
14 July 2013

| Rank | Name | Nationality | Time | Notes |
|---|---|---|---|---|
| 1st place, gold medalist(s) | Amela Terzić | Serbia | 4:05.69 | CUR, NR |
| 2nd place, silver medalist(s) | Corinna Harrer | Germany | 4:07.71 | |
| 3rd place, bronze medalist(s) | Laura Muir | United Kingdom | 4:08.19 | |
| 4 | Ioana Doagă | Romania | 4:08.80 | PB |
| 5 | Giulia Viola | Italy | 4:11.61 | |
| 6 | Ayvika Malanova | Russia | 4:12.99 | |
| 7 | Anna Shchagina | Russia | 4:15.38 | |
| 8 | Elif Karabulut | Turkey | 4:19.87 | |
| 9 | Claudia Bobocea | Romania | 4:20.39 | |
| 10 | Cristina Juan | Spain | 4:21.32 | |
| 11 | Monika Hałasa | Poland | 4:25.42 | |
| | Maureen Koster | Netherlands | DNF | |

Intermediate times:
400m: 1:05.62 Elif Karabulut Turkey
800m: 2:14.63 Corinna Harrer Germany
1200m: 3:19.50 Corinna Harrer Germany

=== Heats ===
Qualified: First 4 in each heat (Q) and 4 best performers (q) advance to the Final

==== Summary ====
| Rank | Name | Nationality | Time | Notes |
|---|---|---|---|---|
| 1 | Corinna Harrer | Germany | 4:11.85 | Q |
| 2 | Anna Shchagina | Russia | 4:12.82 | Q |
| 3 | Amela Terzić | Serbia | 4:14.64 | Q |
| 4 | Maureen Koster | Netherlands | 4:15.00 | Q |
| 5 | Laura Muir | United Kingdom | 4:15.19 | Q |
| 6 | Ioana Doagă | Romania | 4:15.21 | Q SB |
| 7 | Claudia Bobocea | Romania | 4:15.84 | Q PB |
| 8 | Elif Karabulut | Turkey | 4:15.89 | Q PB |
| 9 | Ayvika Malanova | Russia | 4:15.91 | q |
| 10 | Giulia Viola | Italy | 4:16.17 | q |
| 11 | Monika Hałasa | Poland | 4:17.26 | q PB |
| 12 | Cristina Juan | Spain | 4:17.62 | q PB |
| 13 | Diana Mezuliáníková | Czech Republic | 4:18.24 | PB |
| 14 | Yuliya Kutah | Ukraine | 4:19.23 | |
| 15 | Marta Pérez | Spain | 4:19.74 | PB |
| 16 | Kajsa Barr | Sweden | 4:20.05 | PB |
| 17 | Blanca Fernández | Spain | 4:20.71 | |
| 18 | Andrina Schläpfer | Switzerland | 4:21.72 | |
| 19 | Esin Bahar Dölek | Turkey | 4:22.30 | PB |
| 20 | Ingeborg Løvnes | Norway | 4:24.02 | |
| 21 | Kseniya Kozhedub | Russia | 4:24.33 | |
| 22 | Zenobie Vangansbeke | Belgium | 4:27.41 | |
| 23 | Gaiane Ustian | Georgia | 4:45.18 | |

==== Details ====
===== Heat 1 =====
13 July 2013 / 10:40

| Rank | Name | Nationality | Time | Notes |
|---|---|---|---|---|
| 1 | Corinna Harrer | Germany | 4:11.85 | Q |
| 2 | Anna Shchagina | Russia | 4:12.82 | Q |
| 3 | Amela Terzić | Serbia | 4:14.64 | Q |
| 4 | Claudia Bobocea | Romania | 4:15.84 | Q PB |
| 5 | Ayvika Malanova | Russia | 4:15.91 | q |
| 6 | Monika Hałasa | Poland | 4:17.26 | q PB |
| 7 | Kajsa Barr | Sweden | 4:20.05 | PB |
| 8 | Blanca Fernández | Spain | 4:20.71 | |
| 9 | Andrina Schläpfer | Switzerland | 4:21.72 | |
| 10 | Esin Bahar Dölek | Turkey | 4:22.30 | PB |
| 11 | Zenobie Vangansbeke | Belgium | 4:27.41 | |
| 12 | Gaiane Ustian | Georgia | 4:45.18 | |

Intermediate times:
400m: 1:06.79 Kajsa Barr Sweden
800m: 2:17.58 Corinna Harrer Germany
1200m: 3:23.10 Corinna Harrer Germany

===== Heat 2 =====
13 July 2013 / 10:50

| Rank | Name | Nationality | Time | Notes |
|---|---|---|---|---|
| 1 | Maureen Koster | Netherlands | 4:15.00 | Q |
| 2 | Laura Muir | United Kingdom | 4:15.19 | Q |
| 3 | Ioana Doagă | Romania | 4:15.21 | Q SB |
| 4 | Elif Karabulut | Turkey | 4:15.89 | Q PB |
| 5 | Giulia Viola | Italy | 4:16.17 | q |
| 6 | Cristina Juan | Spain | 4:17.62 | q PB |
| 7 | Diana Mezuliáníková | Czech Republic | 4:18.24 | PB |
| 8 | Yuliya Kutah | Ukraine | 4:19.23 | |
| 9 | Marta Pérez | Spain | 4:19.74 | PB |
| 10 | Ingeborg Løvnes | Norway | 4:24.02 | |
| 11 | Kseniya Kozhedub | Russia | 4:24.33 | |

Intermediate times:
400m: 1:09.42 Maureen Koster Netherlands
800m: 2:20.79 Elif Karabulut Turkey
1200m: 3:26.84 Maureen Koster Netherlands

== Participation ==
According to an unofficial count, 23 athletes from 17 countries participated in the event.

- Belgium (1)
- Czech Republic (1)
- Georgia (1)
- Germany (1)
- Italy (1)
- Netherlands (1)
- Norway (1)
- Poland (1)
- Romania (2)
- Russia (3)
- Serbia (1)
- Spain (3)
- Sweden (1)
- Switzerland (1)
- Turkey (2)
- Ukraine (1)
- United Kingdom (1)
