= 2014 European Athletics Championships – Women's 1500 metres =

2014 women's foot race competition

Women's 1500 metres at the European Athletics Championships

The women's 1500 metres at the 2014 European Athletics Championships took place at the Letzigrund from August 12 to 15, 2014.

== Medalists ==
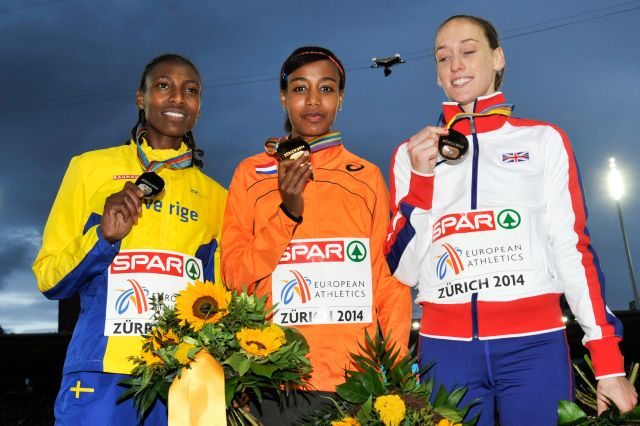
The podium

Gold	Sifan Hassan; Netherlands
Silver	Abeba Aregawi; Sweden
Bronze	Laura Weightman; Great Britain

== Records ==
Standing records prior to the 2014 European Athletics Championships
World record	Qu Yunxia (CHN)	3:50.46	Beijing, China	11 September 1993
European record	Tatyana Kazankina (URS)	3:52.47	Zürich, Switzerland	13 August 1980
Championship record	Tatyana Tomashova (RUS)	3:56.91	Gothenburg, Sweden	13 August 2006
World Leading	Sifan Hassan (NED)	3:57.00	Paris, France	5 July 2014
European Leading	Sifan Hassan (NED)	3:57.00	Paris, France	5 July 2014

== Schedule ==
Date	Time	Round
12 August 2014	10:35	Round 1
15 August 2014	19:25	Final

All times are local times (UTC+2)

== Results ==
=== Round 1 ===
First 4 in each heat (Q) and 4 best performers (q) advance to the Semifinals.

Rank	Heat	Name	Nationality	Time	Note
1	2	Sifan Hassan	Netherlands	4:09.55	Q
2	2	Renata Pliś	Poland	4:10.03	Q
3	2	Federica Del Buono	Italy	4:10.47	Q
4	2	Laura Weightman	Great Britain	4:10.55	Q
5	2	Hannah England	Great Britain	4:10.73	q
6	2	Diana Sujew	Germany	4:11.27	q
7	2	Anna Shchagina	Russia	4:11.27	q
8	2	Nataliya Pryshchepa	Ukraine	4:11.42	q
9	1	Abeba Aregawi	Sweden	4:11.64	Q
10	1	Amela Terzić	Serbia	4:11.75	Q
11	2	Luiza Gega	Albania	4:12.25	
12	1	Svetlana Karamasheva	Russia	4:12.94	Q
13	1	Ingvill Måkestad Bovim	Norway	4:13.02	Q
14	1	Anna Mishchenko	Ukraine	4:14.24	
15	1	Laura Muir	Great Britain	4:14.69	
16	2	Lucia Klocová	Slovakia	4:14.77	
17	1	Maureen Koster	Netherlands	4:15.11	
18	2	Diana Mezuliáníková	Czech Republic	4:15.40	
19	1	Sonja Roman	Slovenia	4:16.38	
20	1	Esma Aydemir	Turkey	4:16.90	
21	1	Margherita Magnani	Italy	4:17.19	
22	1	Agata Strausa	Latvia	4:17.61	
23	1	Isabel Macías	Spain	4:17.76	
24	2	Gamze Bulut	Turkey	4:18.28	
25	2	Liina Tšernov	Estonia	4:25.18	

=== Final ===
Rank	Name	Nationality	Time	Note
1st place, gold medalist(s)	Sifan Hassan	Netherlands	4:04.18	
2nd place, silver medalist(s)	Abeba Aregawi	Sweden	4:05.08	
3rd place, bronze medalist(s)	Laura Weightman	Great Britain	4:06.32	
4	Renata Pliś	Poland	4:06.65	
5	Federica Del Buono	Italy	4:07.49	PB
6	Hannah England	Great Britain	4:07.80	
7	Anna Shchagina	Russia	4:08.05	
8	Diana Sujew	Germany	4:08.63	
9	Ingvill Måkestad Bovim	Norway	4:08.85	
10	Nataliya Pryshchepa	Ukraine	4:08.89	PB
11	Svetlana Karamasheva	Russia	4:11.35	
12	Amela Terzić	Serbia	4:19.11	
