= Essalhi =

Essalhi is a surname. Notable people with the surname include:

- Mouldi Essalhi (born 1932), Tunisian long-distance runner
- Younès Essalhi (born 1993), Moroccan long-distance runner
