= Abeba Aregawi =

Ethiopian-born middle-distance runner

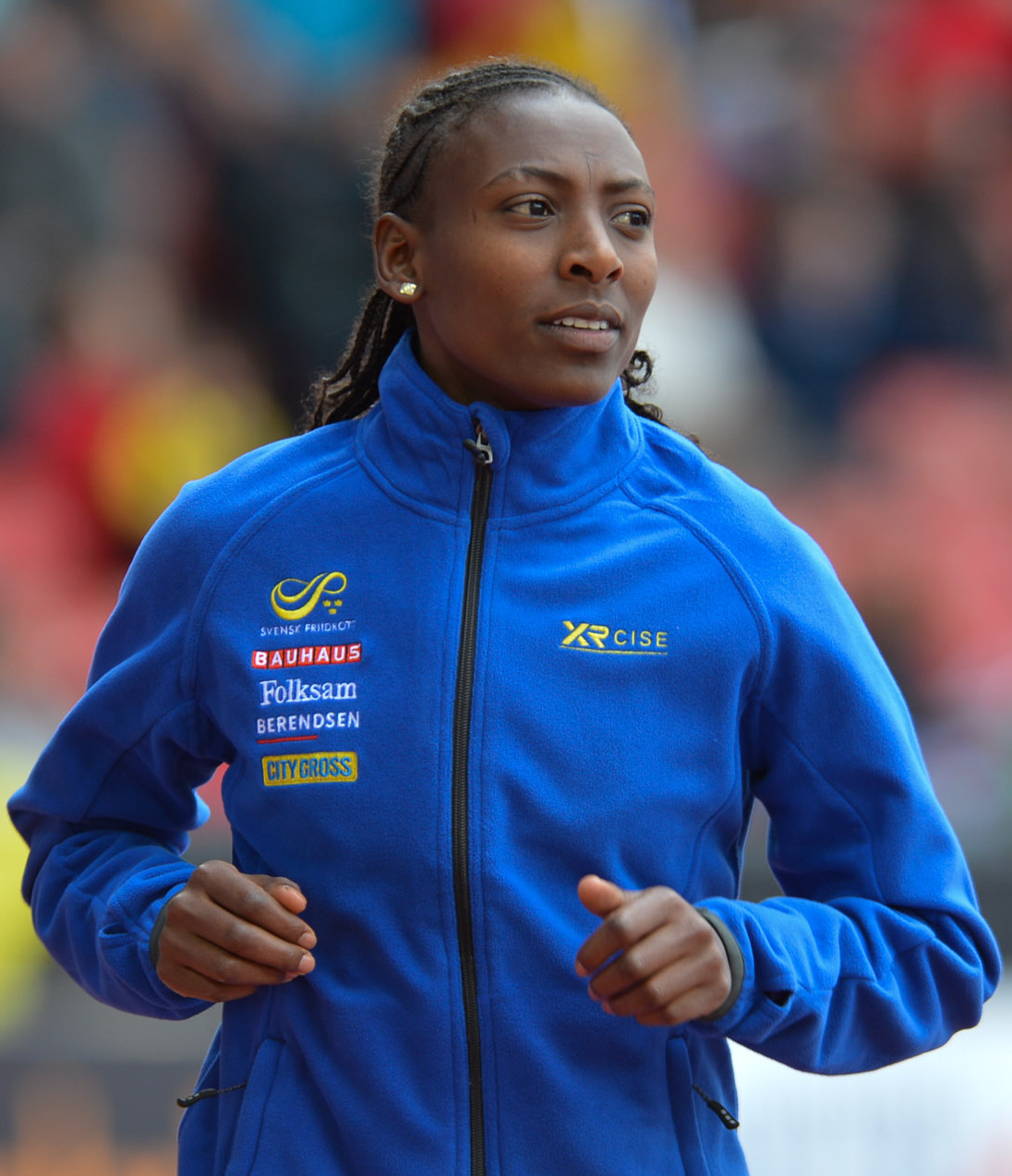
- Aregawi at the 2014 European Athletics Championships in Zürich

Personal information
- Nationality: Ethiopian; Swedish (since June 2012)
- Born: 5 July 1990 (age 36) Adigrat, Ethiopia

Sport
- Sport: Athletics
- Events: 800 metres, 1500 metres
- Club: none
- Retired: 2018 (resumed running in 2024)
Medal record
Women's athletics
Representing Ethiopia
Olympic Games
| Silver medal – second place | 2012 London | 1500 m |
Representing Sweden
World Championships
| Gold medal – first place | 2013 Moscow | 1500 m |
World Indoor Championships
| Gold medal – first place | 2014 Sopot | 1500 m |
Diamond League
| First place | 2012 | 1500 m |
| First place | 2013 | 1500 m |
European Championships
| Silver medal – second place | 2014 Zürich | 1500 m |
European Indoor Championships
| Gold medal – first place | 2013 Gothenburg | 1500 m |

Abeba Aregawi Gebretsadik (Amharic: አበባ አረጋዊ; born 5 July 1990) is an Ethiopian-born Swedish middle-distance runner who specialised in the 1,500 metres. She won the silver medal in the 1,500 m at the 2012 Summer Olympics and a gold medal at the World Championships in 2013. She represented Ethiopia internationally until December 2012, and afterwards represented Sweden.

== Biography ==
Abeba Aregawi was born in Adigrat, Ethiopia in the Tigray Region. She represented Ethiopia internationally until December 2012, after she became a naturalized Swedish citizen. She represented the Stockholm-based club Hammarby IF to January 2016.

Abeba was married to an Ethiopian man with Swedish citizenship and lived in Stockholm from 2009 to 2012. She is now remarried to Yemane Tsegay and lives in Addis Ababa, Ethiopia.

== Athletic career ==
=== 2009 ===
Abeba emerged as an 800 metres runner in 2009 by winning the Ethiopian title in the event ahead of three-time champion Mestawet Tadesse. She competed at a number of European meets after this then set a personal best of 2:01.98 minutes in Tangiers. Her season culminated in an 800 m bronze medal at the 2009 African Junior Athletics Championships, where she finished behind Caster Semenya.

=== 2010 ===
She switched to the 1500 metres in the 2010 season and enjoyed success with wins at the Sollentuna Grand Prix and KBC Night of Athletics meetings, setting a personal best of 4:01.96 minutes at the latter race. She also ran on the 2010 Diamond League circuit for the first time, coming fourth at the DN Galan and seventh at the Weltklasse Zurich.

=== 2011 ===
Abeba had a strong indoor season in 2011, with four straight wins in Düsseldorf, Gent, Birmingham and Stockholm, including a personal best run of 4:01.47 minutes. However, she only made one appearance outdoors as her season was stopped due to injury.

=== 2012 ===
She emerged as one of the world's top 1500 m runners on the 2012 IAAF Diamond League circuit, she won also overall title of Diamond league 2012: 1500 m. She was second to Genzebe Dibaba at the Shanghai Golden Grand Prix, running a best of 3:59.23 minutes. However, she defeated her rival at the Golden Gala, breaking the Ethiopian national record with a run of 3:56.54 minutes, literally days before receiving Swedish citizenship, then won again at the Bislett Games. Abeba won both the 800 m and the 1500 m for Hammarby IF in the Swedish team championships on June 20. Representing Ethiopia at the 2012 Summer Olympics, Abeba ran the fastest time in the 1500 metres competition. However, that was while winning the second semi-final race. In the slow, strategic final, Abeba came off the final turn a step behind the eventual winner Aslı Çakır Alptekin, but faded badly with 20 meters to go in the final straight, initially finishing fifth. After the race, Alptekin, silver medalist Gamze Bulut and bronze medalist Tatyana Tomashova were all disqualified due to doping violations, and Abeba was subsequently re-allocated the silver medal in 2024.

=== 2013 ===
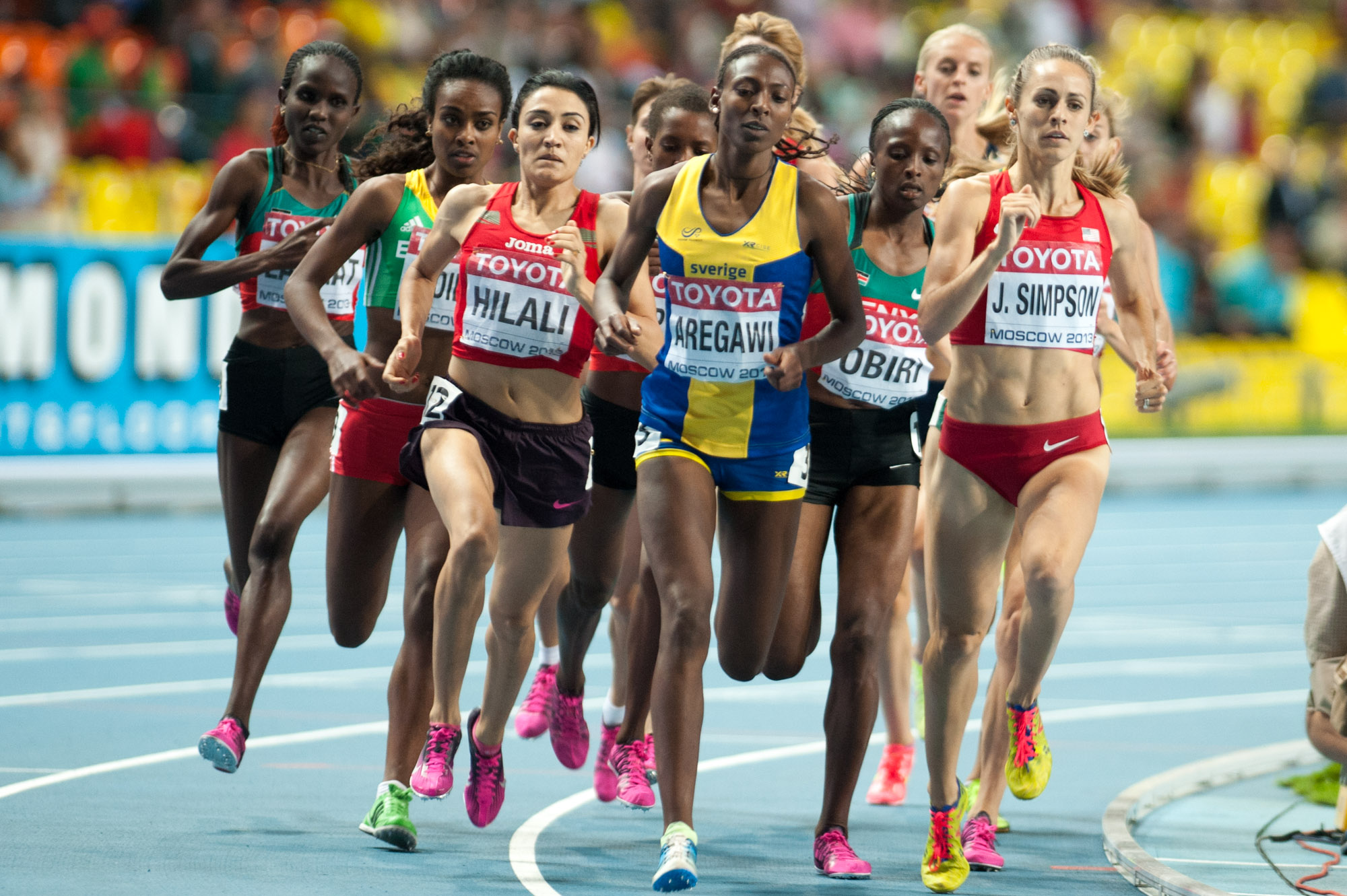
Abeba (C in yellow) leads the pack in the 1500 m final en route to her first world title at the 2013 World Championships in Moscow.

Abeba contested her first race representing Sweden at international level during the European Indoor Championships in front of her home crowd in Gothenburg, where she won the gold medal. She won the first five Diamond League events and secured the overall title with two races left. She set the Swedish national record in the 1500 at 3:56.60 (just .06 slower than her Ethiopian record the previous season) at the first Diamond League meet in Doha, Qatar. Four weeks later, she added the Swedish record at 800 metres, taking it down to 1:59.20 at the Fanny Blankers-Koen Games in Hengelo, Netherlands. Both records took down marks by Malin Ewerlöf-Krepp that were almost 15 years old.

At the World Championships in Moscow Abeba won the gold medal at 1500 metres, Sweden's eighth gold medal since the first championships in 1983.

=== 2014 ===
On 6 February, Abeba won the 1500 m race at XL Galan in Ericsson Globe at the time of 3:57.91. The time was a new European indoor record and the second best of all time. During the indoor season she also won the World Indoor Championships and took her third straight gold medal in international championships.

=== Doping suspension ===
On February 29, 2016, the Swedish Athletics Federation stated that Aregawi had tested positive for the substance (meldonium) in January 2016. She was provisionally suspended from competing the same day. In July 2016, the Swedish Doping Commission lifted her suspension due to insufficient evidence on how long the drug - which was prohibited only January 2016 - takes to be excreted from the body.

Aregawi was officially struck from the list of active athletes by the Swedish Athletics Association on 28 November 2018.

=== 2024-25 ===
After a nine-year hiatus from competition, Aregawi returned to race two road 10K races in 2024. In March 2025, Aregawi finished 3rd at the Lisbon Half Marathon in a time of 1:06:36 to break the Swedish half marathon record. She stated in a press release after, "I plan to compete in both the upcoming European Championships and the World Championships in Japan".

== Achievements ==
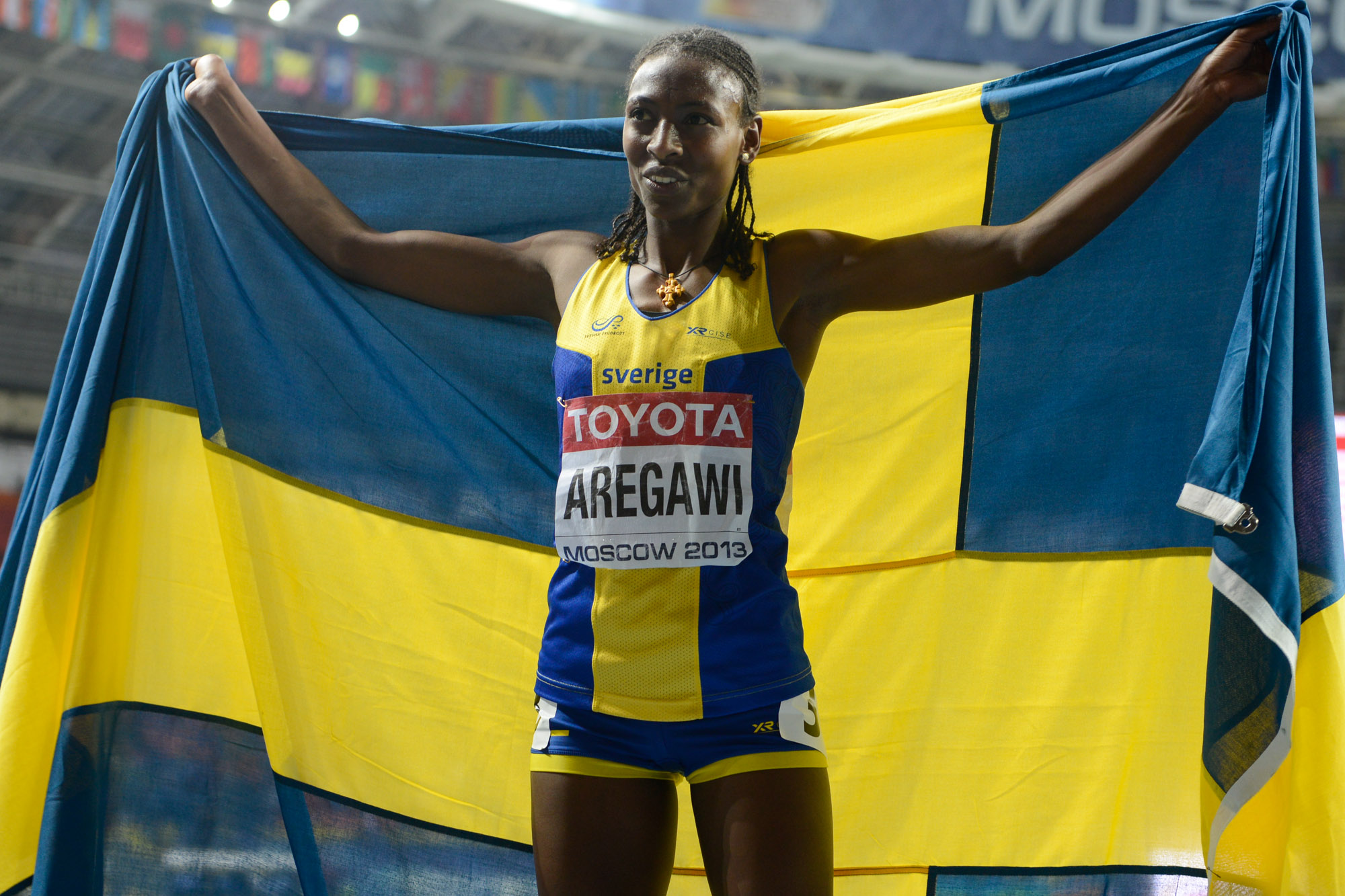
Abeba celebrates her 1500 m victory at Moscow 2013.

=== International competitions ===
| Year | Competition | Venue | Position | Event | Time |
Representing Ethiopia
| 2012 | Olympic Games | London, United Kingdom | 2nd | 1500 m | 4:11.03 |
Representing Sweden
| 2013 | European Indoor Championships | Gothenburg, Sweden | 1st | 1500 m | 4:04.47 |
| 2013 | World Championships | Moscow, Russia | 1st | 1500 m | 4:02:67 |
| 2014 | World Indoor Championships | Sopot, Poland | 1st | 1500 m | 4:00.61 |
| 2014 | European Championships | Zurich, Switzerland | 2nd | 1500 m | 4:05.08 |
| 2015 | World Championships | Beijing, China | 6th | 1500 m | 4:12.16 |

=== Circuit wins and titles ===
- Diamond League Overall 1500 metres winner: 2012, 2013

= IAAF Diamond League event

2011

- PSD Bank Meeting, Düsseldorf
- Indoor Flanders Meeting, Ghent
- Birmingham Indoor Grand Prix, Birmingham
- XL Galan, Stockholm

2012

- Golden Gala, Rome
- Bislett Games, Oslo
- Weltklasse, Zürich
- Diamond League, World Overall winner: 1500 metres women

2013

- XL Galan, Stockholm
- Qatar Athletic Super Grand Prix, Doha
- Adidas Grand Prix, New York City
- Golden Gala, Rome
- Fanny Blankers-Koen Games, Hengelo (800 m)
- British Grand Prix, Birmingham
- Athletissima, Lausanne
- Memorial Van Damme, Brussels
- Sweden-Finland International, Stockholm
- Diamond League, World Overall winner: 1500 metres women

2014

- XL Galan, Stockholm
- Shanghai Golden Grand Prix, Shanghai
- Adidas Grand Prix, New York City
- ETCH Super League, Braunschweig

== Personal bests ==
| Event | Time (m:s) | Venue | Competition | Date | Notes |
|---|---|---|---|---|---|
| 800 metres | 1:59.20 | Hengelo, Netherlands | FBK Games | 8 June 2013 | Swedish record |
| 1500 metres (ETH) | 3:56.54 | Rome, Italy | Golden Gala | 31 May 2012 | Ethiopian record |
| 1500 metres (SWE) | 3:56.60 | Doha, Qatar | Athletic Super GP | 10 May 2013 | Swedish record |
| 1500 metres indoor | 3:57.91 | Stockholm, Sweden | XL Galan | 6 February 2014 | Swedish record, 3rd of all time |
| Half marathon | 1:06:36 | Lisbon, Portugal | Lisbon Half Marathon | 9 March 2025 | Swedish record |

Records
| Preceded by Yelena Soboleva | Women's 1500 m European Indoor Record Holder; February 6, 2014 – | Succeeded by Incumbent |
