= Ingeborg Løvnes =

Norwegian steeplechase runner

Personal information
- Born: 5 September 1992 (age 33)
- Education: Oklahoma State University
- Height: 1.65 m (5 ft 5 in)

Sport
- Sport: Athletics
- Events: 1500 m, 3000 m steeplechase
- Club: Strømmen IF; SK Vidar

Ingeborg Løvnes (born 5 September 1992) is a Norwegian athlete specialising in the 3000 metres steeplechase.

Løvnes competed for the Oklahoma State Cowgirls track and field team in the NCAA.

She is a daughter of middle-distance runner Kirsti Voldnes. In 2016, Ingeborg Løvnes won her first national championship, equalling her mother who also took one title.

== International competitions ==
Year	Competition	Venue	Position	Event	Notes
Representing Norway
2009	World Youth Championships	Brixen, Italy	10th	1500 m	4:30.50
2009	European Junior Championships	Novi Sad, Serbia	18th (h)	1500 m	4:27.64
2010	World Junior Championships	Moncton, Canada	25th (h)	1500 m	4:24.42
2013	European U23 Championships	Tampere, Finland	20th (h)	1500 m	4:24.02
2014	European Championships	Zürich, Switzerland	21st (h)	3000 m s'chase	10:18.11
2016	European Championships	Amsterdam, Netherlands	11th	3000 m s'chase	9:45.75
2016	Olympic Games	Rio de Janeiro, Brazil	33rd (h)	3000 m s'chase	9:44.85

== Personal bests ==
Outdoor

- 800 metres – 2:08.89 (Mannheim 2009)
- 1000 metres – 2:48.44 (Oslo 2012)
- 1500 metres – 4:17.40 (Ninove 2013)
- 3000 metres – 9:29.37 (Gothenburg 2014)
- 3000 metres steeplechase – 9:43.97 (Turku 2016)

Indoor

- 800 metres – 2:12.52 (Haugesund 2013)
- 1500 metres – 4:24.14 (Växjö 2013)
- 3000 metres – 9:32.88 (Fayetteville 2016)
