= Meeting Sport Solidarietà =

- Date: July
- Location: Stadio Guido Teghil, Lignano Sabbiadoro, Italy
- Event type: Track and field
- Established: 1990
- Website: www.meetinglignano.com

The Meeting Sport Solidarietà is an annual track and field meet that takes place at Stadio Guido Teghil in Lignano Sabbiadoro, Italy. It was first held in July 1990.

== Meeting records ==
=== Men ===
Men's meeting records of the Meeting Sport Solidarietà
Event	Record	Athlete	Nationality	Date
100 m	9.98	Steve Mullings	Jamaica	2011
200 m	20.16	Michael Johnson	United States	1991
400 m	44.52	Emmanuel Korir	Kenya	2018
800 m	1:44.25	Khadevis Robinson	United States	2006
1500 m	3:34.64	Joe Waskom	United States	2023
3000 m	7:40.09	Adam Goucher	United States	2005
5000 m	13:35.98	Dejene Birhanu	Ethiopia	2003
110 m hurdles	13.30	Mark McKoy	Canada	1992
400 m hurdles	48.68	Derrick Williams	United States	2006
High jump	2.35 m	Naoto Tobe	Japan	2018
Pole vault	5.70 m	Pyotr Bochkaryov	Russia	1992
Long jump	8.29 m	Larry Myricks	United States	1991
Triple jump	17.20 m	Alexander Martinez	Cuba	2005
Shot put	22.13 m	Leonardo Fabbri	Italy	2025
Discus throw	64.59 m	Igor Primc	Slovenia	2002
Javelin throw	78.84 m	Armin Kerer	Italy	1999
Hammer throw	78.80 m	Andrey Abduvaliyev	EUN	1992
4 × 100 m relay	37.90	Trell Kimmons; Mike Rodgers; Justin Gatlin; Walter Dix	United States	2011

=== Women ===
Women's meeting records of the Meeting Sport Solidarietà
Event	Record	Athlete	Nationality	Date
100 m	11.03 (−1.2 m/s)	Elaine Thompson	Jamaica	3 July 2021
200 m	22.71	Blessing Okagbare	United States	2010
400 m	50.80	Sada Williams	Barbados	2023
800 m	1:57.85	Alysia Johnson	United States	2010
1500 m	4:03.56	Kerri Gallagher	United States	2015
5000 m	15:15.34	Elizabeth Maloy	United States	2015
100 m hurdles	12.81 (−1.0 m/s)	Kellie Wells	United States	19 July 2011
100 m hurdles	12.81	Taylon Bieldt	South Africa	2023
400 m hurdles	55.62	Kaliese Spencer	United States	2006
High jump	1.95 m	Yelena Topchina	Russia	1994
Pole vault	4.52 m	Jenn Stuczynski	United States	2006
Long jump	6.92 m	Larysa Berezhna	EUN	1992
Triple jump	14.26 m	Magdelín Martínez	Cuba	2001
Discus throw	64.20 m	Yaime Perez	Cuba	2002
Javelin throw	54.40 m	Fausta Quintavalla	Italy	1990
Shot put	16.69 m	Nataša Erjavec	Slovenia	1994
3000 m race walk (track)	12:18.51	Ileana Salvador	Italy	1992
4 × 100 m relay	42.45	Bianca Knight; Jessica Young; Lauryn Williams; Barbara Pierre	United States	2011
