= Margaret Muriuki =

Kenyan runner

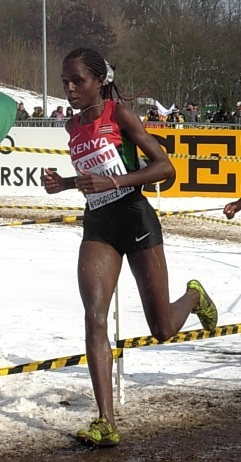
- Margaret Wangari Muriuki at the 2013 IAAF World Cross Country Championships

Medal record

Women's athletics

Representing Kenya

Commonwealth Games
Silver medal – second place	2022 Birmingham	Marathon

African Championships
Bronze medal – third place	2012 Porto-Novo	1500 m

Margaret Wangarì Mūriūki (born 21 March 1986) is a Kenyan professional long and middle-distance runner. She won the silver medal in the women's marathon at the 2022 Commonwealth Games in Birmingham. Earlier in her career she shared in the team gold medal at the 2010 IAAF World Cross Country Championships and won individual medals at the African Cross Country Championships and the African Championships in Athletics (1500 m) in 2012.

She initially started out as a 1500 metres runner and came seventh in that event at the 2007 All-Africa Games. She was the winner of the 2008 Cross de Atapuerca and went on to finish in eighth place at the IAAF World Cross Country Championships that year. She won the 2009 Lotto Cross Cup de Hannut cross country race in 2009.

Mūriūki placed sixth at the 2010 IAAF World Cross Country Championships, which helped the Kenyan women to the world team title. She was the runner-up at the 2012 African Cross Country Championships behind teammate Joyce Chepkirui, both of whom shared the team title. A week later she took third place at the Lisbon Half Marathon, finishing behind Diana Chepkemoi. Showing her versatility, she went back down to the 1500 m at the 2012 African Championships in Athletics and won the bronze medal for Kenya in a personal best of 4:06.50 min. She ran on the American road circuit in August and won both the Beach to Beacon 10K and the Falmouth Road Race. She was runner-up at that year's Portugal Half Marathon (also held in Lisbon).

Mūriūki secured the Kenyan national title in cross country at the start of 2013, guaranteeing selection for the 2013 IAAF World Cross Country Championships.

In December 2019, Mūriūki made her marathon debut at the 47th Honolulu Marathon and won the women's race in 2:31:10.

In 2020, amid scares of the disease COVID-19 spreading in California, Mūriūki ran a dominant race in the Los Angeles Marathon, crossing the finish with a 3-minute lead in a time of 2:29:27.

At the 2022 Commonwealth Games in Birmingham, Mūriūki won the silver medal in the women's marathon in 2:28:00, finishing behind Australia's Jessica Stenson (2:27:31) and ahead of Namibia's Helalia Johannes (2:28:39). The medal was Kenya's first of the Birmingham Games and came moments after Michael Gìthae's bronze in the men's marathon.

In May 2023, Muriuki set a marathon personal best of 2:23:52 with a runner-up finish at the Prague Marathon.

== Competition record ==
Year	Competition	Venue	Position	Event	Notes
Representing Kenya
2007	All-Africa Games	Algiers, Algeria	7th	1500 m	4:13.70
2008	World Cross Country Championships	Edinburgh, United Kingdom	8th	Senior race	Individual
2008	World Cross Country Championships	Edinburgh, United Kingdom	2nd	Senior race	Team
2010	World Cross Country Championships	Bydgoszcz, Poland	6th	Senior race	Individual
2010	World Cross Country Championships	Bydgoszcz, Poland	1st	Senior race	Team
2012	African Cross Country Championships	Cape Town, South Africa	2nd	Senior race	Individual
2012	African Cross Country Championships	Cape Town, South Africa	1st	Senior race	Team
2012	African Championships	Porto-Novo, Benin	3rd	1500 m	4:06.50
2013	World Cross Country Championships	Bydgoszcz, Poland	5th	Senior race	Individual
2013	World Cross Country Championships	Bydgoszcz, Poland	1st	Senior race	Team
2014	African Championships	Marrakesh, Morocco	4th	5000 m	15:55.18
2022	2022 Commonwealth Games	Birmingham, England	2nd	Marathon	2:28:00

=== Personal bests ===
- 1500 metres – 4:06.50 min (2012)
- 3000 metres – 8:37.97 min (2010)
- 5000 metres – 14:40.48 min (2013)
- 10K (road) – 31:05 min (2010)
- Half marathon – 69:21 min (2012)
- Marathon – 2:23:52 (2023)
