= Lauren Johnson =

American middle-distance runner

Personal information
- Born: May 4, 1987 (age 39) Huntington, Indiana
- Height: 1.65 m (5 ft 5 in)

Sport
- Country: United States
- Sport: Track and field, Road racing, Cross country
- Event(s): 1500 metres, 800 metres, Mile run, 5 km, Cross country
- College team: Huntington Foresters
- Team: B.A.A. High Performance

Achievements and titles
- Personal best(s): 800m (Outdoors): 2:00.87 (2018); 800m (Indoors): 2:06.70 (2011); 1000m (Indoors): 2:38.33 (2017); 1,500m (Outdoors): 4:04.17 (2015); 1,500m (Indoors): 4:14.52 (2018); Mile (Outdoors): 4:25.04 (2016); Mile (Indoors): 4:31.63 (2018) Mile (Road): 4:30.7 (2017)
Medal record
Women's athletics
Representing the United States
World Outdoor Championships
2015 Beijing	1500 metres
- Updated on August 29, 2015

Lauren Johnson (born May 4, 1987) is a middle-distance runner from the United States. She competed in the Women's 1500 metres event at the 2015 World Championships in Athletics in Beijing, China.

== Professional ==
The former Oregon Track Club Elite athlete placed 4th at the 2015 USA Track & Field Championships, but she did not have an "A" standard qualifying time to punch her automatic ticket to the 2015 IAAF World Championships in Beijing.

On July 18 in Heusden-Zolder, Belgium at the 2015 KBC Night of Athletics meet, Johnson placed second, clocking 4:04.17 to secure her spot on Team USA.

Johnson won the 2016 Sir Walter Miler in a meet, outdoor North Carolina state and personal record of 4:25.04 (and her first sub-4:30 Mile), and six days later, at the third stop on the BBTM Grand Prix Tour 2016, she won the ServiceNow West Chester Mile, stopping the clock at 4:31.33.

Johnson coached cross country and track at Huntington University beginning in 2018. Following the arrest of the head coach and Johnson's husband, Nicholas, in 2020 for child seduction and kidnapping, Johnson was named head coach. Athletes filed a Title IX lawsuit in 2022 alleging sexual abuse by Nicholas and a program of forced doping by the coaches. Johnson was fired. The lawsuit was dismissed in 2023.

Johnson continues to coach former Huntington University runner, Addy Wiley.

== Personal ==
Born and raised in Huntington, Indiana, she attended Huntington North High School prior to Huntington University, where she earned a degree in Exercise Science with a minor in Psychology.

At Huntington University, Johnson earned All-American honors in track, cross country, and basketball. On her multi-sport background, she said, "I started playing basketball when I was 4 years old and that was my main sport all the way through college. I only began to focus on running once I graduated, so I'm pretty new to the elite level of track and field."

Johnson is married to Nicholas Johnson.

== See also ==
- United States at the 2015 World Championships in Athletics
