= 2014 IAAF World Indoor Championships – Women's 1500 metres =

The women's 1500 metres at the 2014 IAAF World Indoor Championships took place on 7–8 March 2014.

The winning margin was an impressive 6.51 seconds which as of July 2024 remains the only time the women's 1500 metres was won by more than six seconds at these championships.

== Medalists ==
Gold	Silver	Bronze
Abeba Aregawi; Sweden	Axumawit Embaye; Ethiopia	Nicole Sifuentes; Canada

== Records ==
Standing records prior to the 2014 IAAF World Indoor Championships
World record	Genzebe Dibaba (ETH)	3:55.17	Karlsruhe, Germany	1 February 2014
Championship record	Gelete Burka (ETH)	3:59.75	Valencia, Spain	9 March 2008
World Leading	Genzebe Dibaba (ETH)	3:55.17	Karlsruhe, Germany	1 February 2014
African record	Genzebe Dibaba (ETH)	3:55.17	Karlsruhe, Germany	1 February 2014
Asian record	Maryam Yusuf Jamal (BHR)	3:59.79	Valencia, Spain	9 March 2008
European record	Abeba Aregawi (SWE)	3:57.91	Stockholm, Sweden	6 February 2014
North and Central American and Caribbean record	Regina Jacobs (USA)	3:59.98	Boston, United States	1 February 2003
Oceanian Record	Sarah Jamieson (AUS)	4:11.08	Boston, United States	7 February 2009
South American record	Letitia Vriesde (SUR)	4:14.05	Budapest, Hungary	12 February 1992

== Qualification standards ==
Indoor	Outdoor
4:14.00 or 4:31.00 (Mile)	4:03.50

== Schedule ==
Date	Time	Round
7 March 2014	19:35	Heats
8 March 2014	19:00	Final

== Results ==
=== Heats ===
Qualification: First 2 in each heat (Q) and the next 3 fastest (q) qualified for the final.

Rank	Heat	Name	Nationality	Time	Notes
1	2	Abeba Aregawi	Sweden	4:08.74	Q
2	2	Axumawit Embaye	Ethiopia	4:09.46	Q
3	2	Nicole Sifuentes	Canada	4:09.49	q, PB
4	2	Siham Hilali	Morocco	4:09.76	q, SB
5	2	Svetlana Karamasheva	Russia	4:10.91	q, SB
6	1	Rababe Arafi	Morocco	4:10.95	Q
7	1	Heather Kampf	United States	4:11.27	Q, PB
DQ	1	Yelena Korobkina	Russia	~~4:11.43~~	Doping
9	1	Gudaf Tsegay	Ethiopia	4:11.83	
10	1	Jemma Simpson	Great Britain	4:11.93	
11	3	Treniere Moser	United States	4:12.63	Q
12	1	Danuta Urbanik	Poland	4:13.34	
13	3	Luiza Gega	Albania	4:13.78	Q
14	2	Katarzyna Broniatowska	Poland	4:14.31	
15	2	Claire Tarplee	Ireland	4:15.64	
16	3	Mimi Belete	Bahrain	4:16.02	
17	3	Isabel Macías	Spain	4:17.14	
18	3	Maruša Mišmaš	Slovenia	4:18.92	
19	1	Eliane Saholinirina	Madagascar	4:19.64	NR
DQ	3	Gamze Bulut	Turkey	~~4:24.52~~	Doping

=== Final ===
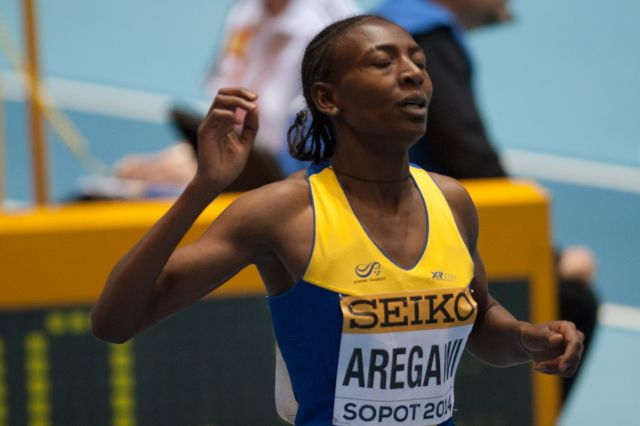
Abeba Aregawi, the winner of the competition

Rank	Name	Nationality	Time	Notes
1st place, gold medalist(s)	Abeba Aregawi	Sweden	4:00.61	
2nd place, silver medalist(s)	Axumawit Embaye	Ethiopia	4:07.12	PB
3rd place, bronze medalist(s)	Nicole Sifuentes	Canada	4:07.61	NR
4	Siham Hilali	Morocco	4:07.62	SB
5	Treniere Moser	United States	4:07.84	PB
6	Luiza Gega	Albania	4:08.24	
7	Svetlana Karamasheva	Russia	4:13.89	
	Rababe Arafi	Morocco	DQ	R163.3(b)
	Heather Kampf	United States	DQ	R163.3(b)
