= Nicole Sifuentes =

Canadian middle-distance runner

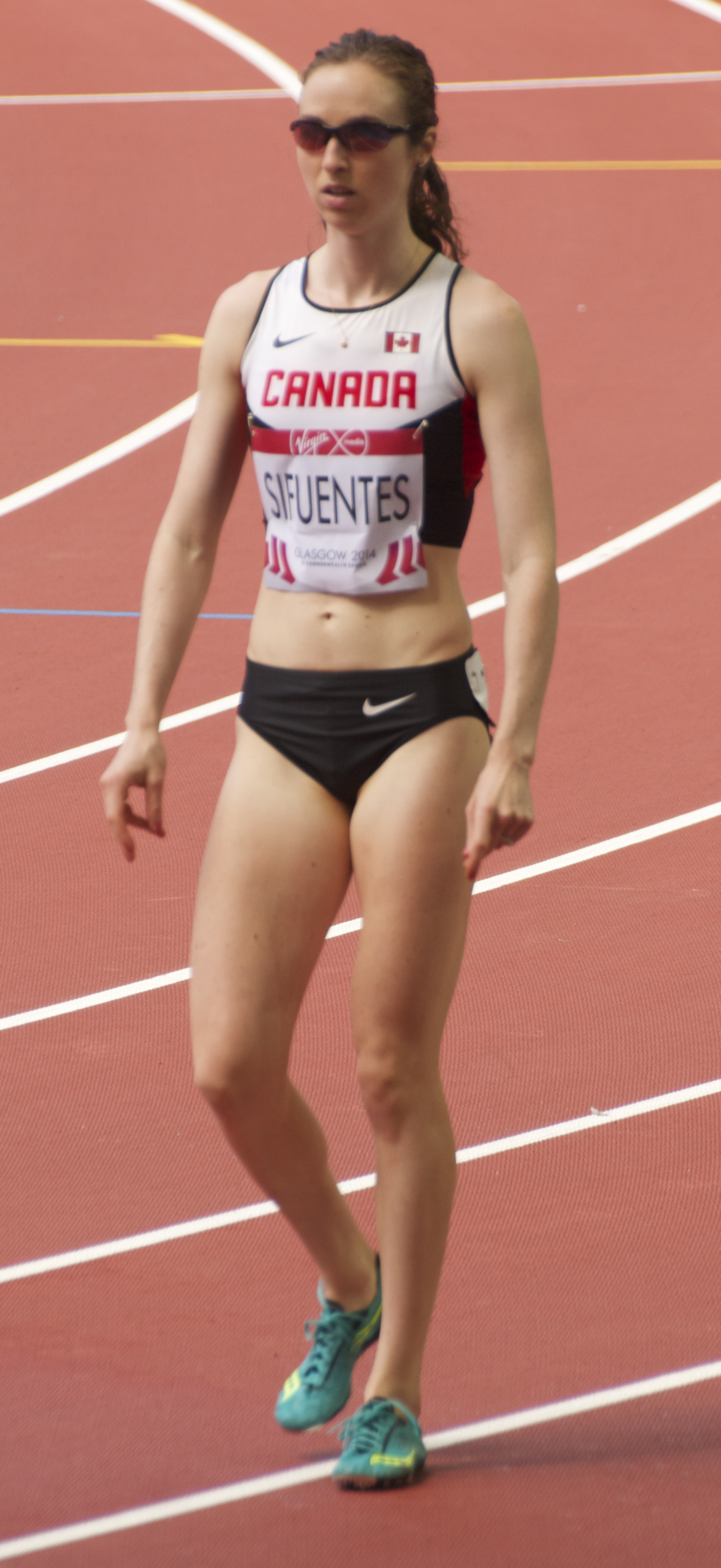
- Nicole Edwards Sifuentes at the Commonwealth Games Glasgow 2014

Personal information
- Nationality: Canadian
- Born: Nicole Edwards; 30 June 1986 (age 40) Winnipeg, Manitoba
- Height: 177 cm (5 ft 10 in)
- Weight: 55 kg (121 lb)

Sport
- Sport: Track and field
- Event: Middle-distance running
- Turned pro: 2008
- Retired: 2018
Medal record
Women's athletics
Representing Canada
World Indoor Championships
Bronze medal – third place	2014 Sopot	1500 m
Pan American Games
Silver medal – second place	2015 Toronto	1500 m
Continental Cup
Silver medal – second place	2010 Split	1500 m

Nicole Sifuentes (née Edwards; born 30 June 1986) is a Canadian track and field athlete who specialises in middle-distance running events.

== Career ==
Hailing from Winnipeg, Manitoba, her first global outing came at the 2003 World Youth Championships in Athletics in Sherbrooke where she reached the semi-finals of the 800 metres. After graduating from high school, she went to the United States to study at the University of Michigan. Competing for the Michigan Wolverines, she had success with the college's relay team, which included a collegiate record double in the 4×800 metres relay and 4×1500 metres relay at the 2007 Penn Relays. At the following year's event, Edwards ran the meet's second fastest ever distance medley relay with the Michigan team, and repeated the same feat in the 4 × 1500 m relay.

The 2010 season marked a breakthrough into the senior national track team. She was selected for the 1500 metres at the 2010 IAAF World Indoor Championships, but she did not manage to make the event final. She earned selection for the combined Americas team at the 2010 IAAF Continental Cup and won the silver medal in the 1500 m, finishing ahead of her more experienced American counterpart Christin Wurth-Thomas. She also gained selection for the Canadian athletics team for the 2010 Commonwealth Games in Delhi.

In 2012, Nicole Sifuentes made her first Canadian Olympic team, where she reached the semifinals. She also finished 19th in the Women's 1500m at the great tournament of Kyoto, in Japan.

Nicole Sifuentes finished 4th at 2014 IAAF World Indoor Championships, and after a DQ, was promoted to bronze after the 3rd-place finisher, Rababe Arafi, made contact with Heather Kampf, resulting in Kampf's fall.

In July 2016 she was officially named to Canada's Olympic team.

== Personal life ==
She married fellow University of Michigan graduate Antonio Sifuentes in 2011.

== Coaching career ==
Nicole Sifuentes helped lead Michigan, working closely under cross country head coach and track and field associate head coach Mike McGuire, to Big Ten team titles. The Winnipeg, Manitoba, native competed professionally for Saucony until 2018, also gaining international experience competing for her native Canada.
