= 2012 African Championships in Athletics – Women's 1500 metres =

The women's 1500 metres at the 2012 African Championships in Athletics was held at the Stade Charles de Gaulle on 29 June.

== Medalists ==
Gold	Rabab Arafi; Morocco
Silver	Mary Kuria; Kenya
Bronze	Margaret Wangari Muriuki; Kenya

== Records ==
Standing records prior to the 2012 African Championships in Athletics
World record	Qu Yunxia (CHN)	3:50.46	Beijing, China	11 September 1993
African record	Hassiba Boulmerka (ALG)	3:55.30	Barcelona, Spain	8 August 1992
Championship record	Gelete Burka (ETH)	4:08.25	Addis Ababa, Ethiopia	2 May 2008
Broken records during the 2012 African Championships in Athletics
Championship record	Rabab Arafi (MAR)	4:05.80	Porto-Novo, Benin	29 June 2012

== Schedule ==
Date	Time	Round
29 June 2012	17:15	Final

== Results ==
=== Final ===
Rank	Name	Nationality	Time	Note
1st place, gold medalist(s)	Rabab Arafi	Morocco	4:05.80	CR
2nd place, silver medalist(s)	Mary Kuria	Kenya	4:06.22	
3rd place, bronze medalist(s)	Margaret Wangari Muriuki	Kenya	4:06.50	
4	Feyne Gudeto	Ethiopia	4:08.29	
5	Janet Achola	Uganda	4:12.55	
6	Gete Dima	Ethiopia	4:13.15	
7	Amina Bakhit	Sudan	4:19.51	
8	Lebogang Phalula	South Africa	4:20.31	
9	Bentille Alassane	Benin	4:53.25	
10	Sandrine Kangue	Gabon	5:04.83	
	Nazret Woldu	Eritrea	DNS	
	Alem Gereziher	Ethiopia	DNS	
	Mapaseka Makhanya	South Africa	DNS	
	Agnes Mansaray	Sierra Leone	DNS	
	Jackline Sakilu	Tanzania	DNS	
