= Isabel Macías =

Spanish runner

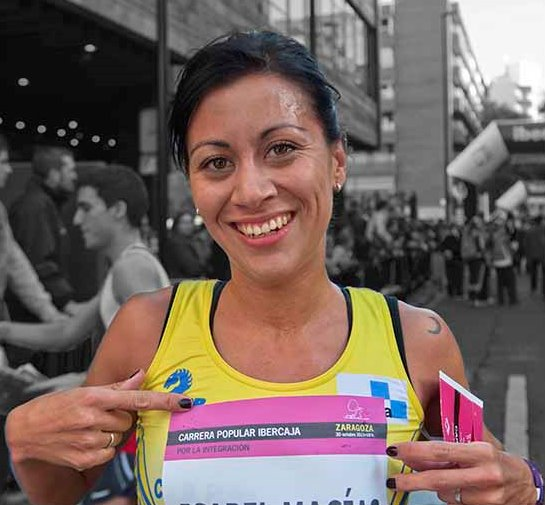
Photo of Isabel Macías in 2011

Isabel Macías Chow is a Spanish runner who specializes in the middle distance events.

== Competition record ==
Year	Competition	Venue	Position	Event	Notes
Representing Spain
2005	European U23 Championships	Erfurt, Germany	6th	1500m	4:17.66
2006	Ibero-American Championships	Ponce, Puerto Rico	1st	1500 m	4:21.65
2006	European Championships	Gothenburg, Sweden	15th (h)	1500 m	4:20.76
2010	Ibero-American Championships	San Fernando, Spain	10th (h)	800 m	2:06.61
2010	Ibero-American Championships	San Fernando, Spain	6th	1500 m	4:18.33
2011	European Indoor Championships	Paris, France	5th	1500 m	4:15.76
2011	World Championships	Daegu, South Korea	30th (h)	1500 m	4:14.75
2012	World Indoor Championships	Istanbul, Turkey	6th	1500 m	4:22.40
2012	European Championships	Helsinki, Finland	8th	1500 m	4:11.12
2013	European Indoor Championships	Gothenburg, Sweden	2nd	1500 m	4:14.19
2014	World Indoor Championships	Sopot, Poland	17th (h)	1500 m	4:17.14
2014	European Championships	Zürich, Switzerland	23rd (h)	1500 m	4:17.76
