= Younès Essalhi =

Moroccan long-distance runner

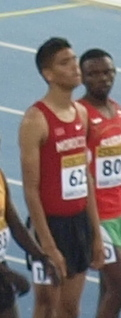
- Younés Essalhi at the 2012 World Junior Championships

Personal information
- Born: 20 February 1993 (age 33)

Sport
- Country: Morocco
- Sport: Track and field
- Event: long-distance running
- Coached by: Kader-Sofiane Mis
- Updated on 29 August 2015

Younès Essalhi (born 20 February 1993) is a male Moroccan long-distance runner. He competed in the 5000 metres event at the 2015 World Championships in Athletics in Beijing, China as well as at the 2016 Summer Olympics.

== See also ==
- Morocco at the 2015 World Championships in Athletics
