= Claire Tarplee =

Irish middle-distance runner

Personal information
- Nationality: Irish
- Born: 22 September 1988 (age 37)

Sport
- Sport: Track and field
- Event: 1500m

Claire Tarplee (born 22 September 1988) is an Irish middle-distance runner. She competed in the 1500 metres event at the 2014 IAAF World Indoor Championships.
