= Maruša Mišmaš-Zrimšek =

Slovenian middle-distance runner

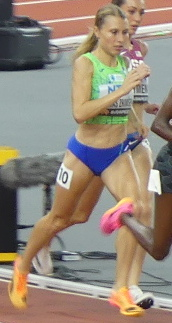
- Maruša Mišmaš-Zrimšek in 2023

Personal information
- Nationality: Slovenian
- Born: Maruša Mišmaš; 24 October 1994 (age 31)
- Height: 1.61 m (5 ft 3 in)
- Weight: 50 kg (110 lb)

Sport
- Sport: Track and field
- Event: 1500m
Medal record
Women's athletics
Representing Slovenia
European Games
Silver medal – second place	2023 Kraków-Małopolska	3000 m s'chase

Maruša Mišmaš-Zrimšek (born 24 October 1994) is a Slovenian middle-distance runner. She competed in the 1500 metres event at the 2014 IAAF World Indoor Championships.

== Competition record ==
Year	Competition	Venue	Position	Event	Notes
Representing Slovenia
2010	Youth Olympic Games	Singapore	5th	400 m hurdles	1:00.69
2011	World Youth Championships	Lille, France	21st (sf)	400 m hurdles	1:02.45
2012	World Junior Championships	Barcelona, Spain	19th (h)	800 m	2:07.23
2012	World Junior Championships	Barcelona, Spain	9th	1500 m	4:14.96
2013	European Indoor Championships	Gothenburg, Sweden	9th (h)	1500 m	4:27.45
2013	European Junior Championships	Rieti, Italy	2nd	3000 m s'chase	9:51.15
2014	World Indoor Championships	Sopot, Poland	18th (h)	1500 m	4:18.92
2014	European Championships	Zürich, Switzerland	10th	3000 m s'chase	9:54.75
2015	European Indoor Championships	Prague, Czech Republic	8th	3000 m	8:59.51
2015	European U23 Championships	Tallinn, Estonia	5th	3000 m s'chase	9:52.03
2015	World Championships	Beijing, China	21st (h)	3000 m s'chase	9:37.73
2018	Mediterranean Games	Tarragona, Spain	3rd	3000 m s'chase	9:35.57
2018	European Championships	Berlin, Germany	11th	3000 m s'chase	9:34.50
2019	European Indoor Championships	Glasgow, United Kingdom	8th (h)	1500 m	4:09.81
2019	World Championships	Doha, Qatar	33rd (h)	1500 m	4:14.94
2019	World Championships	Doha, Qatar	12th	3000 m s'chase	9:25.80
2021	European Indoor Championships	Toruń, Poland	–	3000 m	DQ
2021	Olympic Games	Tokyo, Japan	6th	3000 m s'chase	9:14.84
2022	World Championships	Eugene, United States	14th	3000 m s'chase	9:40.78
2022	European Championships	Munich, Germany	15th	3000 m s'chase	9:53.81
2023	European Indoor Championships	Istanbul, Turkey	8th	3000 m	8:49.98
2023	World Championships	Budapest, Hungary	6th	3000 m s'chase	9:06.37
2026	European Championships	Birmingham, United Kingdom	7th	10,000 m	32:02.57
