= Rababe Arafi =

Moroccan middle-distance runner

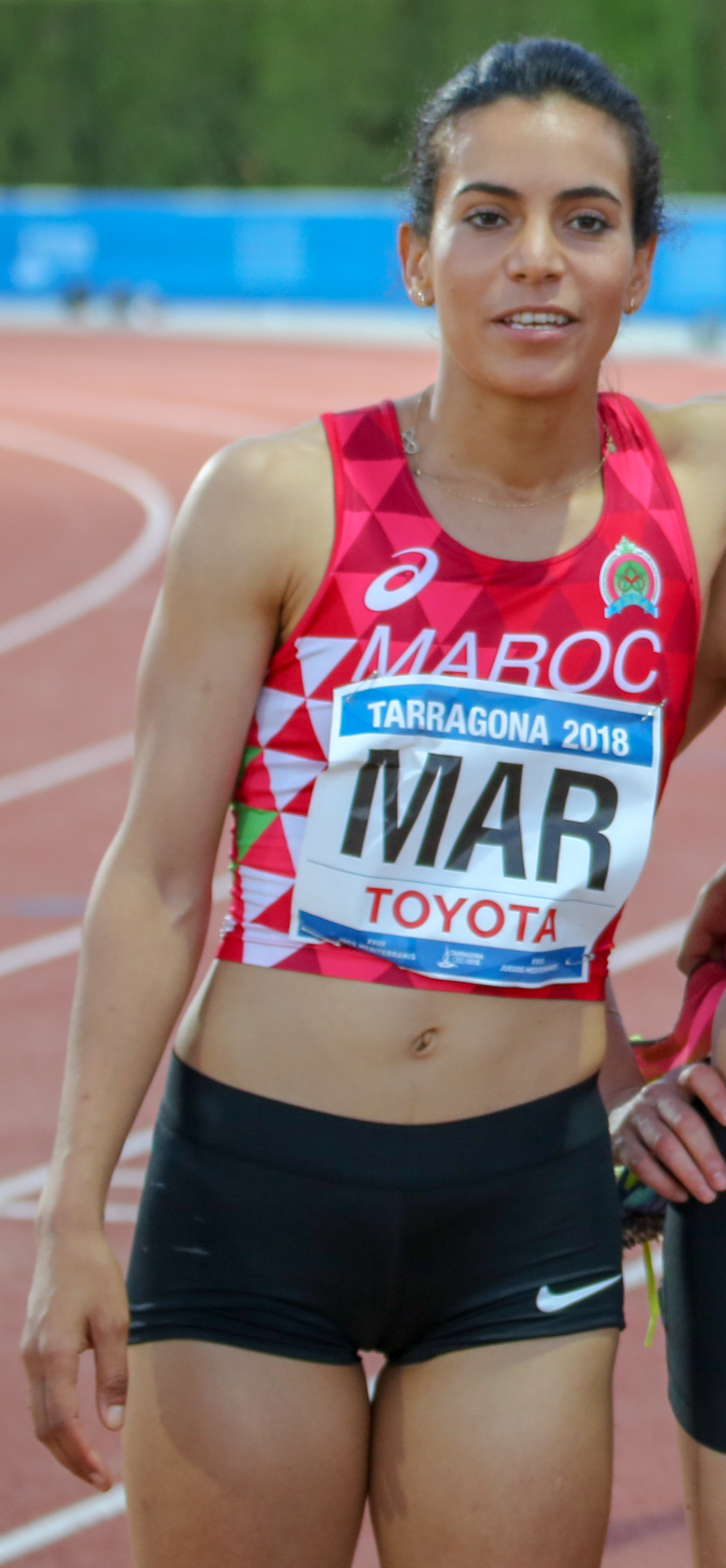
- Arafi in 2018

Personal information
- Born: 12 January 1991 (age 35) Khouribga, Morocco

Sport
- Sport: Athletics
- Event: 1500 metres
Medal record
Women's athletics
Representing Morocco
African Championships
Gold medal – first place	2012 Porto-Novo	1500 m
Silver medal – second place	2016 Durban	1500 m
Silver medal – second place	2018 Asaba	1500 m
Bronze medal – third place	2014 Marrakesh	1500 m

Rababe Arafi (Arabic: رباب عرافي, born 12 January 1991) is a Moroccan middle-distance runner who specialises in the 1500 metres. Born in Khouribga, she is a three-time medallist at the African Championships in Athletics, having been the continental champion in 2012 with a championship record run of 4:05.80 minutes. She holds the Moroccan national record in the mile run and in the 1500m (3:58.84 minutes on 16 June 2019 in Rabat, Diamond League).

== Career ==
Arafi was part of Morocco's team for the 2016 Summer Olympics and was a 1500 m finalist. She represented Morocco at the World Championships in Athletics in 2013, 2015 and 2017, placing eighth in the 1500 m at the 2017 World Championships. Arafi was initially a bronze medallist at the 2014 IAAF World Indoor Championships in the 1500 m, but she was later disqualified because she made contact with Heather Kampf resulting in Kampf's fall. She also competed at the IAAF World Cross Country Championships in 2007, but failed to finish the race. She has won gold medals in the 1500 m at the Arab Athletics Championships (2013), Islamic Solidarity Games (2013 and 2017) and the Jeux de la Francophonie (2013 and 2017).

== International competitions ==
Year	Competition	Venue	Position	Event	Notes
Representing Morocco
2007	World Cross Country Championships	Mombasa, Kenya	—	Junior race	DNF
2012	African Championships	Porto-Novo, Benin	1st	1500 m	4:05.80
2013	Arab Championships	Doha, Qatar	1st	1500 m	4:53.92
2013	Arab Championships	Doha, Qatar	1st	4 × 400 m	3:42.10
2013	Mediterranean Games	Mersin, Turkey	–	1500 m	DNF
2013	Mediterranean Games	Mersin, Turkey	–	4 × 400 m	DQ
2013	World Championships	Moscow, Russia	21st (sf)	1500 m	4:09.86
2013	Jeux de la Francophonie	Nice, France	1st	1500 m	4:18.70
2013	Islamic Solidarity Games	Palembang, Indonesia	1st	1500 m	4:19.27
2014	World Indoor Championships	Sopot, Poland	6th (h)	1500 m	4:10.95^{1}
2014	African Championships	Marrakesh, Morocco	3rd	1500 m	4:12.08
2015	Arab Championships	Isa Town, Bahrain	2nd	1500 m	5:22.30
2015	World Championships	Beijing, China	4th	800 m	1:58.90
2015	World Championships	Beijing, China	9th	1500 m	4:13.66
2015	Military World Games	Mungyeong, South Korea	5th	1500 m	4:21.17
2016	World Indoor Championships	Portland, United States	10th (h)	1500 m	4:10.82
2016	African Championships	Durban, South Africa	5th	800 m	2:01.49
2016	African Championships	Durban, South Africa	2nd	1500 m	4:03.95
2016	Olympic Games	Rio de Janeiro, Brazil	–	800 m	DNF
2016	Olympic Games	Rio de Janeiro, Brazil	12th	1500 m	4:15.16
2017	Islamic Solidarity Games	Baku, Azerbaijan	1st	1500 m	4:18.82
2017	Jeux de la Francophonie	Abidjan, Ivory Coast	1st	1500 m	4:17.23
2017	World Championships	London, United Kingdom	8th	1500 m	4:04.35
2018	World Indoor Championship	Birmingham, United Kingdom	8th	1500 m	4:14.94
2018	Mediterranean Games	Tarragona, Spain	1st	800 m	2:01.01
2018	Mediterranean Games	Tarragona, Spain	1st	1500 m	4:12.83
2018	Mediterranean Games	Tarragona, Spain	4th	4 × 400 m relay	3:33.91
2018	African Championships	Asaba, Nigeria	–	800 m	DNF
2018	African Championships	Asaba, Nigeria	2nd	1500 m	4:14.12
2019	African Games	Rabat, Morocco	2nd	800 m	2:03.20
2019	World Championships	Doha, Qatar	7th	800 m	2:00.48
2019	World Championships	Doha, Qatar	9th	1500 m	3:59.93
2021	Olympic Games	Tokyo, Japan	14th (sf)	800 m	1:59.86
2021	Olympic Games	Tokyo, Japan	–	1500 m	DNF
2023	Arab Championships	Marrakesh, Morocco	1st	1500 m	4:24.37
2023	Jeux de la Francophonie	Kinshasa, DR Congo	3rd	1500 m	4:45.42

^{1}Disqualified in the final

== See also ==
- List of champions of the African Championships in Athletics
