= Kerri Gallagher =

American middle-distance runner

Personal information
- Nationality: American
- Born: May 31, 1989 (age 37) Arlington, Virginia

Sport
- Sport: Track
- Events: 1500 meters, mile
- College team: Fordham
- Turned pro: 2011

Achievements and titles
- Personal bests: 800 meters: 2:02.63; 1500 meters: 4:03.56
- Updated on August 31, 2015

Kerri Gallagher (born May 31, 1989) is an American middle-distance runner who specialises in the 1500-meter run. She began to focus on running full-time in 2012 and consistently improved over the following years, resulting in a third-place finish at the USA Outdoor Track and Field Championships in 2015. She competed collegiately for Fordham University.

== Running career ==
=== High school ===
Born to John and Patricia Gallagher, she grew up in New York City, hometown of Belle Harbor, New York and attended Bishop Kearney High School in Brooklyn. From a sporting family, several of her siblings took up running. While at Bishop Kearney, her coach was John Lovett, who was friends with Matt Centrowitz. This friendship eventually resulted in Gallagher's post-college link-up with training partner Lauren Centrowitz.

=== Collegiate ===
She went on to enroll at Fordham University, taking a degree in mathematics. She competed for the Fordham Rams collegiate sports team while there and in 2010 won the 800-meter run at the Atlantic 10 Conference championships and was runner-up over 1000 m at the indoor Eastern College Athletic Conference championships. In her final year she was runner-up in the 800 m at the indoor ECAC championships and winner of the Atlantic 10 1500 m. She ended her collegiate career with bests of 2:07.61 minutes for the 800 m a 4:20.25 minutes for the 1500 m. Her 800 m best was a school record and she served as the school's track team captain in 2010 and 2011.

=== Post-collegiate ===
After college, she began working in the finance sector at Morgan Stanley Smith Barney but changed her mind and chose to focus on running full-time, training under coach Matt Centrowitz with the New Balance Pacers Track Club. She worked with Centrowitz as a women's track assistant coach at the American University.

She set her sights on qualifying for the 2012 London Olympics, but failed in that attempt, later saying "I didn't have a great understanding of professional running and what it takes to make an Olympic team." She ended the season as a much improved runner, however, with bests of 2:06.73 and 4:16.07 for the 800 m and 1500 m, and had a win at the Army Ten-Miler.

The following year she improved her bests in all distances from 800 m to 10 miles, including a 1500 m win at the Victoria International Track Classic in 4:09.64 minutes and a course record of 54:56 minutes at the Army Ten-Miler. She competed for the first time at national level and placed fifth in the 1500 m at the 2013 USA Outdoor Track and Field Championships.

Gallagher made her debut in the IAAF Diamond League at the 2014 adidas Grand Prix in New York, coming eighth with an 800 m best of 2:05.91 minutes. Her improvement over 1500 m stalled, having a best of 4:09.99 minutes that year, but she knocked over twenty seconds off her 3000 meters best with 9:07.39 minutes. She had a third straight win at the Army Ten-Miler.

Her breakthrough into the world elite came at the 2015 Penn Relays, where her 4:34.42 minutes win over the mile run was a world-leading time. Entering the 1500 m at the 2015 USA Outdoor Track and Field Championships, she set a personal record of 4:08.70 minutes in the qualifiers and, in a more tactical final, placed third overall to qualify for her first world championships team. She achieved the qualifying standard with another best of 4:03.56 minutes to win at the Meeting Sport Solidarieta in Lignano – her first win in Europe. She had her first race against the world's elite at the Herculis Diamond League meet in Monaco and placed sixth.

Kerri Gallagher finished runner-up behind Shannon Rowbury at the 2016 NYRR Wanamaker Mile in a personal record 4:26.18 (#7 U.S. woman all-time indoors). In July, Gallagher placed 23rd in the 1500 meters in 4:22.47 at 2016 United States Olympic Trials (track and field).

== Personal records ==
- 800 meters – 2:02.63 min (2015)
- 1500 meters – 4:03.56 min (2015)
- Mile run – 4:26.18 min (2016)
- 3000 meters indoor – 9:07.39 (2014)
- Two miles indoor – 9:58.77 min (2015)
