= Svetlana Karamasheva =

Russian middle-distance runner

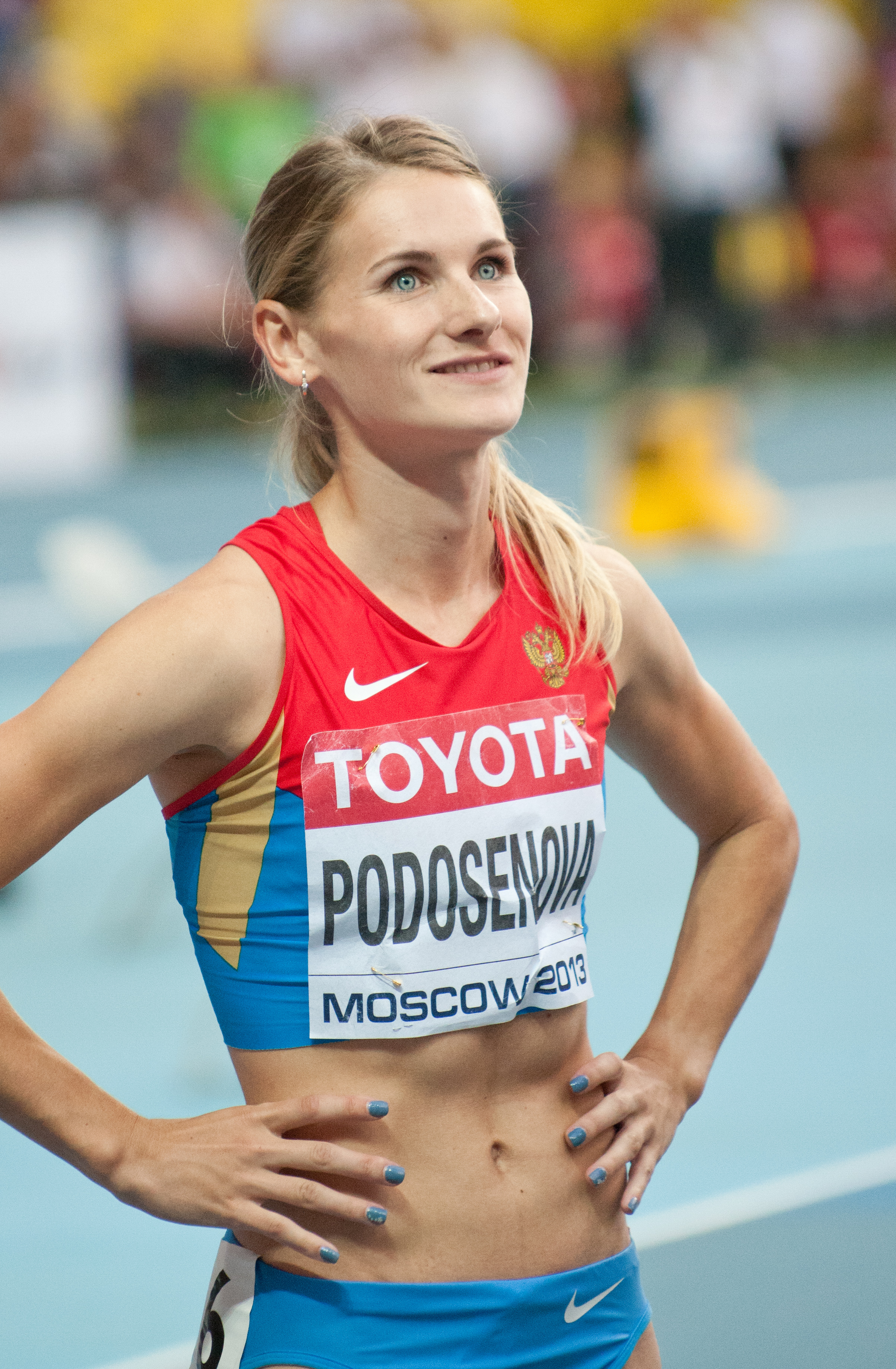
- 2013

Personal information
- Nationality: Russian
- Born: 24 May 1988 (age 37)

Sport
- Sport: Track and field
- Event: 1500m

Svetlana Karamasheva (née Podosenova; born 24 May 1988) is a Russian middle-distance runner. She competed in the 1500 metres event at the 2014 IAAF World Indoor Championships.

Karamasheva has faced anti-doping sanctions for violations including use of EPO. She has been banned from competing June 2017 - December 2019, June 2021 - December 2030.

== Achievements ==
Year	Competition	Venue	Position	Event	Notes
Representing Russia
2013	World Championships	Moscow, Russia	13th (sf)	1500 m	4:05.36
2014	World Indoor Championships	Sopot, Poland	7th	1500 m	4:13.89
