= Giulia Viola =

Italian middle-distance runner

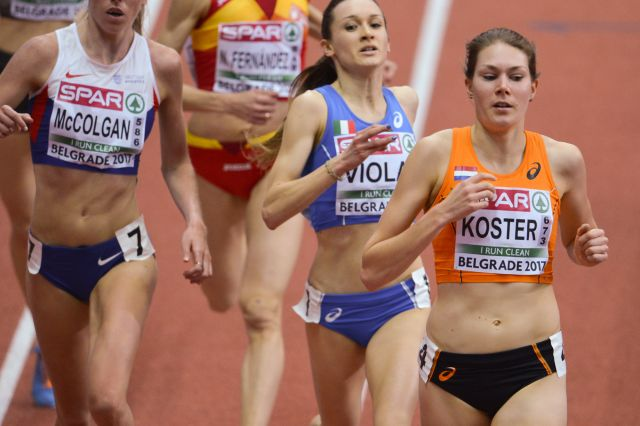
- Giulia Viola (with the Italian jersey) at 2017 European Athletics Indoor Championships

Personal information
- Full name: Giulia Alessandra Viola
- Nationality: Italian
- Born: 24 April 1991 (age 35) Montebelluna, Italy
- Height: 1.62 m (5 ft 4 in)
- Weight: 45 kg (99 lb)

Sport
- Country: Italy
- Sport: Athletics
- Event: Middle-distance running
- Club: Fiamme Gialle

Achievements and titles
- Personal bests: 800 m: 2:07.19 (2010); 1500 m: 4:07.67 (2014); 3000 m: 9:01.33 (2014); 5000 m: 15:38.47 (2015)

Giulia Viola (born 24 April 1991) is an Italian middle-distance runner.

== Biography ==
Viola was the Italian national champion in the 5000 metres. Viola was a finalist at the 2013 European Athletics Indoor Championships in the 1500 metres finishing 7th. At the 2014 European Athletics Championships Viola finished 8th in the 5000 metres with a personal best time.
