= Anna Shchagina =

Russian middle-distance runner

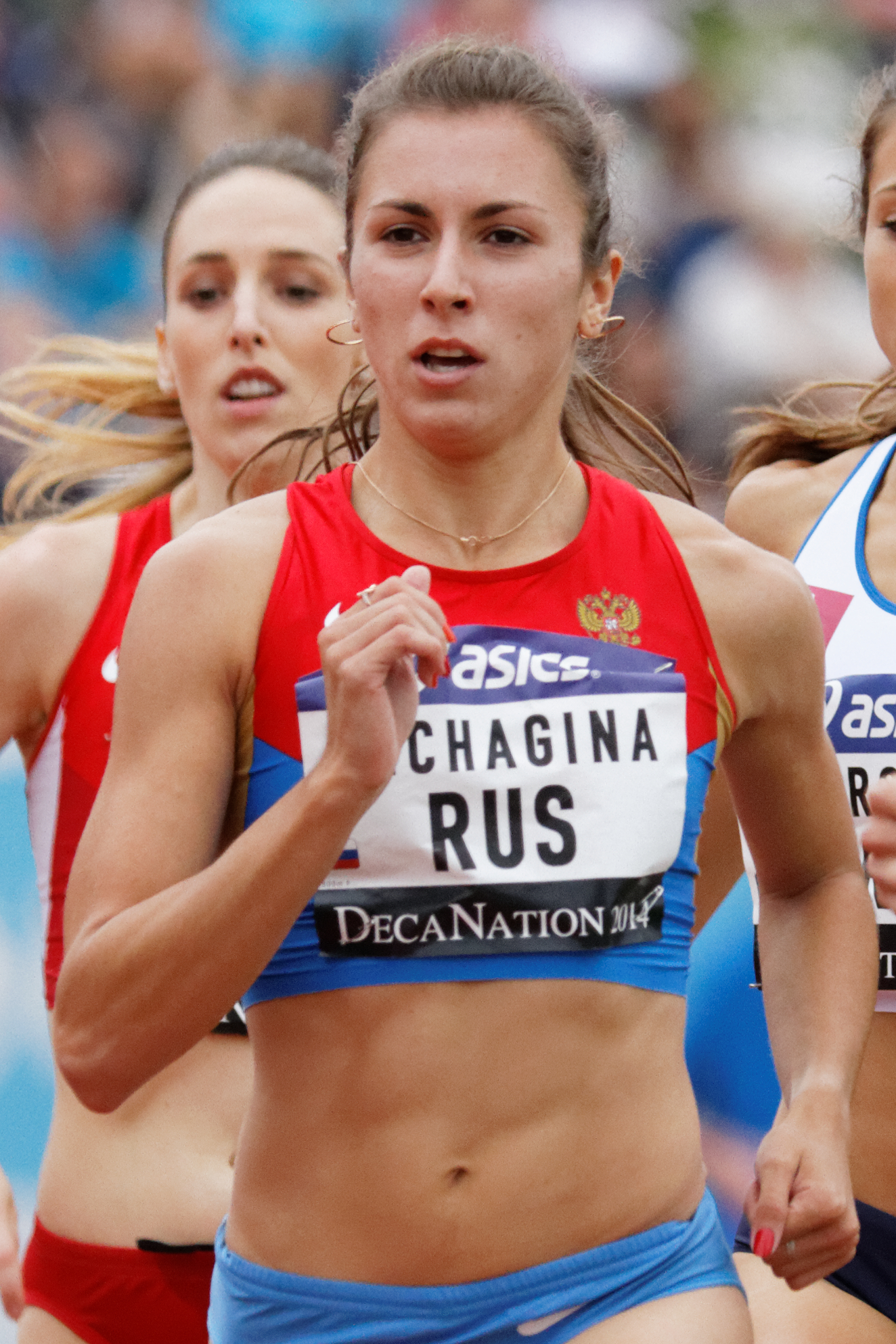
- Anna Shchagina at the DécaNation 2014

Personal information
- Nationality: Russian
- Born: 7 December 1991 (age 34)

Sport
- Sport: Track and field
- Event: 800m

Anna Shchagina (born 7 December 1991) is a Russian middle-distance runner. She competed in the 800 metres event at the 2014 IAAF World Indoor Championships.
