= 2010 European Athletics Championships – Women's 800 metres =

Women's 800 metres at the European Athletics Championships
- Venue: Estadi Olímpic Lluís Companys
- Location: Barcelona, Spain
- Dates: 27 July 2010 (round 1); 28 July 2010 (semi-finals); 30 July 2010 (final)
- Competitors: 24 from 15 nations
- Winning time: 1:58.85 min

Medalists
gold medal	Yvonne Hak	Netherlands
silver medal	Jennifer Meadows	Great Britain
bronze medal	Lucia Klocová	Slovakia

The women's 800 metres at the 2010 European Athletics Championships was held at the Estadi Olímpic Lluís Companys in Barcelona, Spain, on 27, 28 and 30 July 2010.

== Background ==
Standing records prior to the 2010 European Athletics Championships
Record	Athlete (nation)	Time	Location	Date
World record	Jarmila Kratochvílová (TCH)	1:53.28	Munich, West Germany	26 July 1983
European record	Jarmila Kratochvílová (TCH)	1:53.28	Munich, West Germany	26 July 1983
Championship record	Olga Mineyeva (URS)	1:55.41	Athens, Greece	8 September 1982
World Leading	Alysia Johnson (USA)	1:57.34	Monaco	22 July 2010
European Leading	Mariya Savinova (RUS)	1:57.56	Eugene, United States	3 July 2010

== Results ==
=== Round 1 ===
The heats of round 1 were held on 27 July 2010, starting at 20:10. The first 2 athletes in each heat (Q) and the next 2 fastest athletes overall (q) qualified for the semi-finals.

==== Heat 1 ====
Results from the first heat of round 1
Rank	Lane	Name	Nationality	Time	Notes
DQ	7	Mariya Savinova	Russia	~~1:59.71~~	Q, Doping
2	2	Yvonne Hak	Netherlands	2:00.35	Q
3	8	Eglė Balčiūnaitė	Lithuania	2:01.19	
4	6	Marilyn Okoro	Great Britain & N.I.	2:01.33	SB
DQ	4	Olga Cristea	Moldova	~~2:02.31~~	Doping
DQ	1	Sviatlana Usovich	Belarus	~~2:02.74~~	Doping
5	5	Élian Périz	Spain	2:03.55	
6	3	Olha Zavhorodnya	Ukraine	2:03.58	

==== Heat 2 ====
Results from the second heat of round 1
Rank	Lane	Name	Nationality	Time	Notes
DQ	7	Svetlana Klyuka	Russia	~~1:58.89~~	Q, ~~SB~~, Doping
1	3	Jennifer Meadows	Great Britain & N.I.	1:58.90	Q
2	4	Mayte Martínez	Spain	1:59.12	q, SB
3	5	Lucia Klocová	Slovakia	1:59.31	q, SB
4	2	Yuliya Krevsun	Ukraine	1:59.44	
5	8	Claudia Hoffmann	Germany	2:01.19	
6	1	Rose-Anne Galligan	Ireland	2:01.76	PB
7	6	Daniela Reina	Italy	2:01.94	

==== Heat 3 ====
Results from the third heat of round 1
Rank	Lane	Name	Nationality	Time	Notes
1	1	Jemma Simpson	Great Britain & N.I.	1:59.18	Q
2	4	Lenka Masná	Czech Republic	1:59.71	Q, PB
3	8	Elisa Cusma Piccione	Italy	1:59.80	
4	7	Nataliya Lupu	Ukraine	2:00.50	
5	2	Eléni Filándra	Greece	2:00.88	PB
6	3	Angelika Cichocka	Poland	2:01.17	PB
7	5	Tatyana Andrianova	Russia	2:01.23	
8	6	Irene Alfonso	Spain	2:01.61	SB

==== Summary ====
Results of round 1
Rank	Heat	Name	Nationality	Time	Notes
DQ	2	Svetlana Klyuka	Russia	~~1:58.89~~	Q, ~~SB~~, Doping
1	2	Jennifer Meadows	Great Britain & N.I.	1:58.90	Q
2	2	Mayte Martínez	Spain	1:59.12	q, SB
3	3	Jemma Simpson	Great Britain & N.I.	1:59.18	Q
4	2	Lucia Klocová	Slovakia	1:59.31	q, SB
5	2	Yuliya Krevsun	Ukraine	1:59.44	
DQ	1	Mariya Savinova	Russia	~~1:59.71~~	Q, Doping
6	3	Lenka Masná	Czech Republic	1:59.71	Q, PB
7	3	Elisa Cusma Piccione	Italy	1:59.80	
8	1	Yvonne Hak	Netherlands	2:00.35	Q
9	3	Nataliya Lupu	Ukraine	2:00.50	
10	3	Eléni Filándra	Greece	2:00.88	PB
11	3	Angelika Cichocka	Poland	2:01.17	PB
12	1	Eglė Balčiūnaitė	Lithuania	2:01.19	
13	2	Claudia Hoffmann	Germany	2:01.19	
14	3	Tatyana Andrianova	Russia	2:01.23	
15	1	Marilyn Okoro	Great Britain & N.I.	2:01.33	SB
16	3	Irene Alfonso	Spain	2:01.61	SB
17	2	Rose-Anne Galligan	Ireland	2:01.76	PB
18	2	Daniela Reina	Italy	2:01.94	
DQ	1	Olga Cristea	Moldova	~~2:02.31~~	Doping
DQ	1	Sviatlana Usovich	Belarus	~~2:02.74~~	Doping
19	1	Élian Périz	Spain	2:03.55	
20	1	Olha Zavhorodnya	Ukraine	2:03.58	

=== Semi-finals ===
The semi-finals were held on 28 July 2010, starting at 19:25.

=== Final ===
The final was held on 30 July 2010, starting at 21:50.

Results of the final
Rank	Lane	Name	Nationality	Time	Notes
1st place, gold medalist(s)	7	Yvonne Hak	Netherlands	1:58.85	PB
2nd place, silver medalist(s)	6	Jennifer Meadows	Great Britain & N.I.	1:59.39	
3rd place, bronze medalist(s)	2	Lucia Klocová	Slovakia	1:59.48	
4	5	Jemma Simpson	Great Britain & N.I.	1:59.90	
5	1	Lenka Masná	Czech Republic	1:59.91	
6	8	Mayte Martínez	Spain	1:59.97	
DQ	4	Mariya Savinova	Russia	~~1:58.22~~	Doping
DQ	3	Svetlana Klyuka	Russia	~~2:00.15~~	Doping
