= 2010 IAAF World Indoor Championships – Women's 800 metres =

The women's 800 metres at the 2010 IAAF World Indoor Championships was held at the ASPIRE Dome on 12 and 14 March.

== Medalists ==
Gold	Silver	Bronze
Mariya Savinova; Russia	Jenny Meadows; Great Britain	Alysia Johnson; United States

== Records ==
Standing records prior to the 2010 IAAF World Indoor Championships
World record	Jolanda Čeplak (SLO)	1:55.82	Vienna, Austria	3 March 2002
Championship record	Ludmila Formanová (CZE)	1:56.90	Maebashi, Japan	7 March 1999
World Leading	Yevgeniya Zinurova (RUS)	1:58.65	Moscow, Russia	14 February 2010
African record	Maria Mutola (MOZ)	1:57.06	Liévin, France	21 February 1999
Asian record	Miho Sugimori (JPN)	2:00.78	Yokohama, Japan	22 February 2003
European record	Jolanda Čeplak (SLO)	1:55.82	Vienna, Austria	3 March 2002
North and Central American and Caribbean record	Nicole Teter (USA)	1:58.71	New York City, United States	2 March 2002
Oceanian Record	Toni Hodgkinson (NZL)	2:00.36	Paris, France	9 March 1997
South American record	Letitia Vriesde (SUR)	1:59.21	Birmingham, Great Britain	23 February 1997

== Qualification standards ==
Indoor	Outdoor
2:04.00	2:00.00

== Schedule ==
Date	Time	Round
March 12, 2010	10:30	Heats
March 14, 2010	17:15	Final

== Results ==
=== Heats ===
Qualification: First 2 in each heat (Q) and the next 2 fastest (q) advance to the final.

Rank	Heat	Name	Nationality	Time	Notes
1	2	Jenny Meadows	Great Britain	2:00.39	Q
2	2	Mariya Savinova	Russia	2:00.95	Q
3	2	Alysia Johnson	United States	2:01.55	q
4	2	Eglė Balčiūnaitė	Lithuania	2:02.37	q, PB
5	1	Anna Pierce	United States	2:03.05	Q
DQ	1	Yevgeniya Zinurova	Russia	~~2:03.44~~	Q, Doping
6	1	Lenka Masná	Czech Republic	2:03.59	
7	1	Halima Hachlaf	Morocco	2:03.81	
8	1	Yuliya Krevsun	Ukraine	2:03.91	
9	2	Nataliia Lupu	Ukraine	2:04.30	
10	1	Élian Périz	Spain	2:04.71	
11	1	Victoria Griffiths	Great Britain	2:04.90	
12	1	Viktoriya Yalovtseva	Kazakhstan	2:05.68	
13	2	Margarita Matsko	Kazakhstan	2:06.36	
	2	Angelika Cichocka	Poland	DQ	
	2	Elisa Cusma Piccione	Italy	DNS	

=== Final ===
Rank	Name	Nationality	Time	Notes
1st place, gold medalist(s)	Mariya Savinova	Russia	1:58.26	WL
2nd place, silver medalist(s)	Jenny Meadows	Great Britain	1:58.43	NR
3rd place, bronze medalist(s)	Alysia Johnson	United States	1:59.60	PB
4	Anna Pierce	United States	2:00.53	PB
5	Eglė Balčiūnaitė	Lithuania	2:01.37	NR
DQ	Yevgeniya Zinurova	Russia	~~2:01.68~~	Doping
