= 2011 Spanish Athletics Championships =

- Dates: 6–7 August 2011
- Host city: Málaga, Spain
- Venue: Estadio Ciudad de Málaga
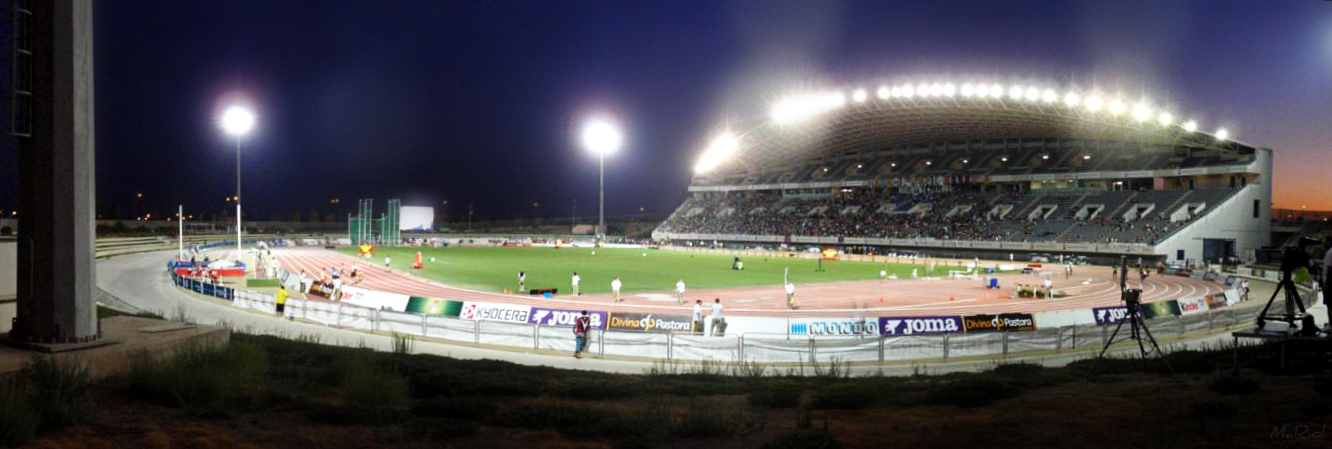

The 2011 Spanish Athletics Championships was the 91st edition of the national championship in outdoor track and field for Spain. It was held on 6 and 7 August at the Estadio Ciudad de Málaga in Málaga, Andalusia. It served as the selection meeting for the 2011 World Championships in Athletics. A total of 636 athletes (339 men and 297 women) competed at the event.

The club championships in relays and combined track and field events were contested separately from the main competition.

== Results ==
=== Men ===
Event	Gold		Silver		Bronze	
100 metres	Ángel David Rodríguez; Fútbol Club Barcelona	10.40	Eduard Viles; C.A.Igualada	10.49	Orkatz Beitia; Playas de Castellón	10.60
200 metres (wind: +2.5 m/s)	Ángel David Rodríguez; Fútbol Club Barcelona	20.34 w	Iván Jesús Ramos; CAP Alcobendas	20.60 w	Edgar Pérez; AA Catalunya	20.79 w
400 metres	Roberto Briones; La Rioja Atletismo	47.07	Mark Ujakpor; AD Marathon	47.12	Marc Orozco; Fútbol Club Barcelona	47.13
800 metres	Kevin López; Playas de Castellón	1:47.87	Luis Alberto Marco; CD Nike Running	1:48.28	Antonio Manuel Reina; CD Nike Running	1:49.18
1500 metres	Manuel Olmedo; Fútbol Club Barcelona	3:53.86	Diego Ruiz; Atletismo Diego Ruiz	3:54.65	Francisco Javier Abad; Playas de Castellón	3:54.66
5000 metres	Jesús España; Amigos Valdemoro	14:06.37	Sergio Sánchez; Fútbol Club Barcelona	14:06.65	Francisco Javier Alves; AJH-Camargo	14:09.92
110 m hurdles	Jackson Quiñónez; Fútbol Club Barcelona	13.70	Francisco Javier López; Playas de Castellón	13.97	Juan Ramón Barragán; Unicaja Atletismo	14.12
400 m hurdles	Diego Cabello; Playas de Castellón	50.91	Ignacio Sarmiento; Ourense-Postal	50.99	Javier Sagredo; AD Capiscol	51.46
3000 m s'chase	Tomás Tajadura; UBU-Caja Burgos	8:28.70	Víctor García; Playas de Castellón	8:29.33	Ángel Mullera; CA Lloret-La Selva	8:30.30
High jump	Miguel Ángel Sancho; Playas de Castellón	2.26 m	Javier Bermejo; Fútbol Club Barcelona	2.22 m	Simón Siverio; Tenerife C.Canarias	2.16 m
Pole vault	Igor Bychkov; Playas de Castellón	5.35 m	Manel Concepción; Playas de Castellón	5.25 m	Albert Vélez; Fútbol Club Barcelona	5.25 m
Long jump	Jean Marie Okutu; SG.Pontevedra	7.84 m	Luis Felipe Méliz; Playas de Castellón	7.80 m	Eusebio Cáceres; Centre E.Colivenc	7.76 m
Triple jump	Lisvany Pérez (CUB); Playas de Castellón	16.82 m	Vicente Docavo; Playas de Castellón	16.24 m	José Emilio Bellido; Playas de Castellón	16.13 m
Shot put	Borja Vivas; Atlético Málaga	19.26 m	Germán Millán; Tenerife C.Canarias	18.77 m	Carlos Tobalina; Grupo ISN Navarra	18.26 m
Discus throw	Mario Pestano; Tenerife C.Canarias	67.97 m	Frank Casañas; Playas de Castellón	66.15 m	Luis Martínez; Playas de Castellón	61.31 m
Hammer throw	Isaac Vicente; A.D.Marathon	70.41 m	Pedro José Martín; Playas de Castellón	68.43 m	Ignacio Calderón; Unicaja Atlético	64.08 m
Javelin throw	Rafael Baraza; Pto. Alicante OHL	72.34 m	Jordi Sánchez; Fútbol Club Barcelona	68.44 m	José Manuel Vila; Playas de Castellón	67.35 m
Decathlon	David Gómez Martínez; R.C.Celta	7298 pts	Óscar González; Atlético Málaga	7193 pts	Joan Estruch; Playas de Castellón	6931 pts
10 km walk	Paquillo Fernández; Run 04 Atletismo	40:55.62	Miguel Ángel López; UCAM-Athleo	41:52.42	José Ignacio Díaz; Pto. Alicante OHL	42:40.01
4 × 100 m relay	Playas de Castellón; Ricardo Monteiro (POR); João Ferreira (POR); Arnaldo Abrantes (POR); Yazaldes Nascimento (POR)	39.98	Pto. Alicante OHL; Iván Martínez Linuesa; Orkatz Beitia Gandiaga; Alberto Gavaldá; Yunier Pérez	40.13	Fútbol Club Barcelona; Eusebio Cáceres; Theo Felix Mensah Ekuban; Jean Carlos Hernandez Villazana; Ajibola Olawuyi Raheem	40.52
4 × 400 m relay	A.D.Marathon; Manuel Sánchez Delgado; Ignacio Laguna Aparicio; Miguel Cartagena Teigell; Mark Ujakpor	3:10.10	Playas de Castellón; Adrian Gonzalez Velasco; Maury Surel Castillo (CUB); Diego Cabello Miñon; Alejandro Guerrero Diaz	3:10.74	Fútbol Club Barcelona; Marc Orozco Torres; Abel de la Varga Pastor; David Palacio Martin; Pau Fradera Miralles	3:11.44

=== Women ===
Event	Gold		Silver		Bronze	
100 metres	Digna Luz Murillo; Valencia Terra i Mar	11.55	Belén Recio; Deportivo Hummel	11.60	María Martín; Valencia Terra i Mar	12.14
200 metres	Belén Recio; Deportivo Hummel	23.52	Amparo María Cotan; Valencia Terra i Mar	23.75	Plácida Martínez; Fútbol Club Barcelona	24.06
400 metres	Aauri Bokesa; Valencia Terra i Mar	54.25	Natalia Romero; Unicaja Atletismo	54.56	Begoña Garrido; Valencia Terra i Mar	54.89
800 metres	Nuria Fernández; C.D.Nike Running	2:04.18	Élian Périz; Valencia Terra i Mar	2:05.13	Khadija Rahmouni; Simply-Scorpio	2:07.80
1500 metres	Isabel Macías; Pto. Alicante OHL	4:22.49	Iris Fuentes-Pila; At.Santutxu	4:22.92	Solange Pereira; EAMJ Fuerteventura	4:23.94
5000 metres	Dolores Checa; Playas de Castellón	15:46.77	Alessandra Aguilar; Fútbol Club Barcelona	15:56.75	Lidia Rodríguez; Atl. Santutxu	16:06.71
100 m hurdles	Caridad Jerez; Pto.Alicante OHL	13.72	Virginia Villar; Pto.Alicante OHL	14.16	Teresa Errandonea; Bidasoa Atl.	14.23
400 m hurdles	Olga Ortega; Fútbol Club Barcelona	58.46	Laura Sotomayor; Pto.Alicante OHL	59.34	Prudencia Guerrero; UCAM-Cartagena	1:00.79
3000 m s'chase	Zulema Fuentes-Pila; Piélagos Inelecma	10:08.62	Estefanía Tobal; Valencia Terra i Mar	10:13.66	Eva Arias; Valencia Terra i Mar	10:15.06
High jump	Ruth Beitia; Piélagos Inelecma	1.92 m	Gema Martín-Pozuelo; Valencia Terra i Mar	1.86 m	Raquel Álvarez; Valencia Terra i Mar	1.80 m
Pole vault	Anna Pinero; Valencia Terra i Mar	4.41 m	Naroa Agirre; Kraft-San Sebastián	4.26 m	Ángela Arias; Valencia Terra i Mar	3.96 m
Long jump	Concepción Montaner; C.A. L´Eliana	6.53 m	María del Mar Jover; Pto.Alicante OHL	6.23 m	Maitane Azpeitia; Kraft-San Sebastián	6.12 m
Triple jump	Patricia Sarrapio; Valencia Terra i Mar	14.01 m	Ruth Ndoumbe; Valencia Terra i Mar	13.78 m	Maitane Azpeitia; Kraft-San Sebastián	13.22 m
Shot put	Úrsula Ruiz; Fútbol Club Barcelona	16.80 m	Irache Quintanal; Valencia Terra i Mar	16.71 m	Nazaret Viesca; Grupo ISN Navarra	14.48 m
Discus throw	Sabina Asenjo; Fútbol Club Barcelona	54.02 m	Irache Quintanal; Valencia Terra i Mar	52.35 m	Mercedes Santalo; Pto. Alicante OHL	51.36 m
Hammer throw	Berta Castells; Valencia Terra i Mar	69.53 m	Laura Redondo; Fútbol Club Barcelona	64.81 m	Jenifer Nevado; Kraft-San Sebastián	57.85 m
Javelin throw	Mercedes Chilla; Valencia Terra i Mar	60.91 m	Nora Aída Bicet; Valencia Terra i Mar	59.86 m	Carmen Sánchez Parrondo; Playas de Castellón	53.68 m
Heptathlon	Laura Ginés; Simply Scorpio 71	5583 pts	Estefanía Fortes; A.A.Catalunya	5545 pts	Tamara del Río; A.A.Catalunya	4983 pts
10 km walk	Júlia Takács; Pto.Alicante OHL	44:05.41	María Vasco; C.A.María Vasco	45:45.18	María José Poves; Simply Scorpio 71	46:25.68
4 × 100 m relay	Puerto Alicante OHL; Virginia Villar Soria; Caridad Jerez; Carlota Requeno Conde; Alicia Varas Meis	46.37	Kraff San Sebastián; Marian Garrantxo Mendez; Alazne Furundarena Sarriegi; Amaia Alzelay Losañez; Maitane Azpeitia Alvarez	46.80	A.A.Catalunya; María Ángeles Fuentes Ruiz; Estefanía Fortes; Tamara del Rio Escribano; Cristina Ferrandiz Bernal	47.21
4 × 400 m relay	Valencia Terra i Mar; Begoña Garrido Barro; Élian Périz; Elena Garcia Grimau; Aauri Bokesa	3:40.86	Fútbol Club Barcelona; Olga Ortega Almagro; Esther Guerrero; Adoración Iniesta Pacheco; Plácida Martínez	3:43.15	Puerto Alicante OHL; Teresa Gutiérrez Torres; Isabel Macías; Laura Sotomayor; Kudirat Akhigbe (NGR)	3:44.39

== See also ==
- 2011 Spanish Indoor Athletics Championships
