= 2009 European Athletics Indoor Championships – Women's 800 metres =

The Women's 800 metres event at the 2009 European Athletics Indoor Championships was held on March 6–8.

== Medalists ==
Gold	Silver	Bronze
Mariya Savinova; Russia	Oksana Zbrozhek; Russia	Elisa Cusma Piccione; Italy

== Results ==
=== Heats ===
First 2 of each heat (Q) and the next 6 fastest (q) qualified for the semifinals.

Rank	Heat	Name	Nationality	Time	Notes
1	1	Jennifer Meadows	Great Britain	2:03.11	Q
2	1	Mariya Savinova	Russia	2:03.70	Q
3	3	Oksana Zbrozhek	Russia	2:03.74	Q
4	3	Elisa Cusma Piccione	Italy	2:03.97	Q
5	1	Yvonne Hak	Netherlands	2:04.10	q
6	1	Tamara Tverdostup	Ukraine	2:04.24	q
7	3	Nataliya Lupu	Ukraine	2:04.26	q
8	3	Mihaela Neacsu	Romania	2:04.75	q
9	2	Tetyana Petlyuk	Ukraine	2:04.96	Q
10	2	Marilyn Okoro	Great Britain	2:05.01	Q
11	3	Karin Storbacka	Finland	2:05.17	q
12	2	Mirela Lavric	Romania	2:05.31	q
13	2	Dana Šatrová	Czech Republic	2:05.47	
14	2	Élian Périz	Spain	2:08.10	

=== Semifinals ===
First 3 of each semifinals qualified directly (Q) for the final.

Rank	Heat	Name	Nationality	Time	Notes
1	2	Tetyana Petlyuk	Ukraine	2:01.21	Q
2	2	Elisa Cusma Piccione	Italy	2:01.43	Q
3	2	Jennifer Meadows	Great Britain	2:01.73	Q
4	1	Oksana Zbrozhek	Russia	2:02.09	Q
5	1	Marilyn Okoro	Great Britain	2:02.63	Q
6	1	Mariya Savinova	Russia	2:03.12	Q
7	2	Mihaela Neacsu	Romania	2:03.42	SB
8	2	Tamara Tverdostup	Ukraine	2:03.70	
9	1	Nataliya Lupu	Ukraine	2:05.26	
10	1	Mirela Lavric	Romania	2:06.93	
11	2	Yvonne Hak	Netherlands	2:07.14	
12	1	Karin Storbacka	Finland	2:08.92	

=== Final ===
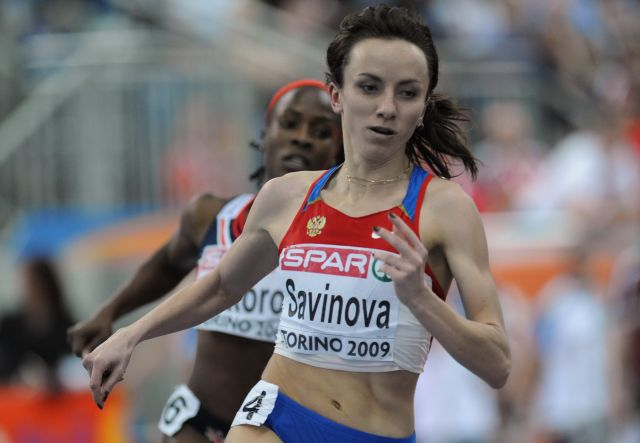
Mariya Savinova won the gold for Russia.

Rank	Name	Nationality	Time	Notes
1st place, gold medalist(s)	Mariya Savinova	Russia	1:58.10	PB
2nd place, silver medalist(s)	Oksana Zbrozhek	Russia	1:59.20	SB
3rd place, bronze medalist(s)	Elisa Cusma Piccione	Italy	2:00.23	
4	Jennifer Meadows	Great Britain	2:00.42	
5	Marilyn Okoro	Great Britain	2:03.30	
6	Tetyana Petlyuk	Ukraine	2:03.77	
