= 2011 Spanish Indoor Athletics Championships =

- Dates: 19–20 February 2011
- Host city: Valencia, Spain
- Venue: Luis Puig Palace
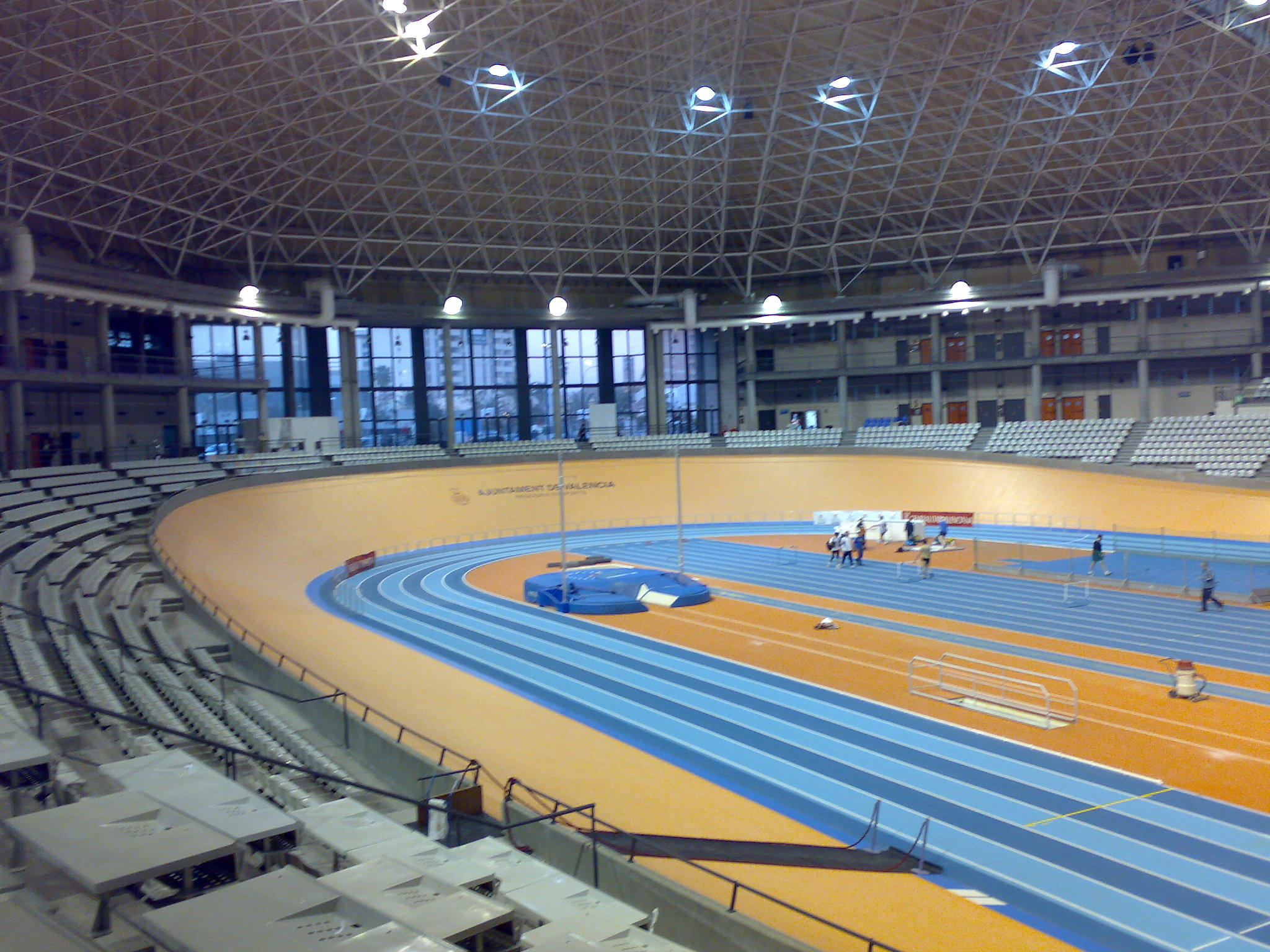

The 2011 Spanish Indoor Athletics Championships was the 47th edition of the national championship in indoor track and field for Spain. It was held on 19 and 20 February at the Luis Puig Palace in Valencia

== Medal summary ==
=== Men ===
Event	Gold		Silver		Bronze	
60 metres	Iván Mocholí	6.69	Ángel David Rodríguez	6.72	Orkatz Beitia	6.80
200 metres	Diego Alonso	21.37	Josué Mena	21.57 PB	Óscar Husillos	21.70
400 metres	Marc Orozco	47.29 PB	Mark Ujakpor	47.34	Roberto Briones	47.89
800 metres	Luis Alberto Marco	1:50.42	Kevin López	1:50.71	David Palacios	1:51.22
1500 metres	Manuel Olmedo	3:45.93	Diego Ruíz	3:45.96	Juan Carlos Higuero	3:46.14
3000 metres	Jesús España	7:50.70	Víctor García	7:51.95 PB	Francisco Javier Alves	7:52.40
60 m hurdles	Felipe Vivancos	7.71	Juan Ramón Barragán	8.02	Víctor Orduña	8.10 PB
High jump	Javier Bermejo	2.22 m	Miguel Ángel Sancho	2.18 m	Pablo Sarmiento	2.15 m
Pole vault	Igor Bychkov	5.35 m	Javier Gazol	5.30 m	Didac Salas	5.30 m NJR PB
Long jump	Eusebio Cáceres	8.08 m PB	Luis Felipe Méliz	7.85 m	Jean Marie Okutu	7.57 m PB
Triple jump	Vicente Docavo	16.61 m NJR PB	José Emilio Bellido	16.23 m PB	Pablo Torrijos	16.16 m PB
Shot put	Borja Vivas	20.18 m PB	Manuel Martínez Gutiérrez	18.92 m	Germán Millán	18.14 m
Heptathlon	Agustín Félix	5748 pts	Jonay Jordán	5560 pts PB	Óscar González	5331 pts

=== Women ===
Event	Gold		Silver		Bronze	
60 metres	Digna Luz Murillo	7.31 PB	Amparo María Cotán	7.37 PB	María Martín-Sacristán	7.53 PB
200 metres	Estela García	24.11 PB	Alazne Furundarena	24.38 PB	Plácida Azahara Martínez Navío	24.46
400 metres	Natalia Romero	55.17	Aauri Bokesa	55.20	Begoña Garrido	55.34
800 metres	Élian Périz	2:04.87	Margarita Fuentes-Pila	2:05.62	Maria Carmen Gonzales	2:08.79 PB
1500 metres	Isabel Macías	4:24.69	Beatriz Antolín	4:27.00	Eva Arias	4:28.06
3000 metres	Dolores Checa	9:08.36	Paula González	9:09.20 PB	Sonia Bejarano	9:10.20
60 m hurdles	Ana Torrijos	8.37	Caridad Jerez	8.53	Virginia Villar	8.64
High jump	Ruth Beitia	1.95 m	Raquel Álvarez	1.88 m PB	Gema Martín-Pozuelo	1.80 m
Pole vault	Naroa Agirre	4.30 m	Anna María Pinero	4.25 m	Marta Cot	3.95 m PB
Long jump	Concepción Montaner	6.57 m	María del Mar Jover	6.27 m PB	Juliet Itoya	6.18 m PB
Triple jump	Patricia Sarrapio	13.73 m	Rebeca Azcona	13.21 m	Débora Calveras	13.19 m
Shot put	Úrsula Ruiz	16.10 m	Magnolia Iglesias	15.12 m	Irache Quintanal	15.04 m
Pentathlon	Bárbara Hernando	4381 pts NR PB	Laura Ginés	4034 pts PB	Estefanía Fortes	4030 pts PB

== See also ==
- 2011 Spanish Athletics Championships
