= 2011 European Athletics Indoor Championships – Women's 800 metres =

The Women's 800 metres event at the 2011 European Athletics Indoor Championships was held at March 4–6 with the final being held on March 6 at 16:00 local time.

The original winner, Yevgeniya Zinurova, was later disqualified for doping offences and runner-up Jenny Meadows was promoted to the gold medal position. The original bronze medalist Yuliya Rusanova, who was later elevated to the silver medal position, was subsequently stripped of her medal, due to inconsistencies in her biological passport.

== Records ==
Standing records prior to the 2011 European Athletics Indoor Championships
World record	Jolanda Čeplak (SLO)	1:55.82	Vienna, Austria	3 March 2002
European record	Jolanda Čeplak (SLO)	1:55.82	Vienna, Austria	3 March 2002
Championship record	Jolanda Čeplak (SLO)	1:55.82	Vienna, Austria	3 March 2002
World Leading	Yuliya Rusanova (RUS)	1:58.14	Moscow, Russia	17 February 2011
European Leading	Yuliya Rusanova (RUS)	1:58.14	Moscow, Russia	17 February 2011

== Results ==
=== Heat ===
First 2 in each heat and 4 best performers advanced to the Semifinals. The heats were held at 16:25.

Rank	Heat	Name	Nationality	Time	Notes
DQ	2	Yevgeniya Zinurova	Russia	~~2:01.07~~	Q, Doping
1	2	Linda Marguet	France	2:02.21	Q
2	4	Jennifer Meadows	Great Britain	2:02.96	Q
3	2	Yeliz Kurt	Turkey	2:03.02	q
DQ	4	Tetyana Petlyuk	Ukraine	~~2:03.02~~	Q, Doping
4	1	Tatyana Paliyenko	Russia	2:03.24	Q
5	4	Élian Périz	Spain	2:03.56	q, SB
6	4	Jana Hartmann	Germany	2:03.58	q
7	1	Eglė Balčiūnaitė	Lithuania	2:03.74	Q
8	1	Marilyn Okoro	Great Britain	2:03.86	q
9	2	Eléni Filándra	Greece	2:03.89	SB
DQ	3	Yuliya Rusanova	Russia	~~2:05.17~~	Q, Doping
10	3	Liliya Lobanova	Ukraine	2:05.41	Q
11	3	Lenka Masná	Czech Republic	2:06.65	
12	3	Mihaela Nunu	Romania	2:06.67	
13	1	Teodora Kolarova	Bulgaria	2:08.21	
14	1	Luiza Gega	Albania	2:08.75	
15	2	Margarita Fuentes-Pila	Spain	2:09.15	
16	3	Suvi Selvenius	Finland	2:10.88	
	1	Merve Aydın	Turkey	DNF	
	4	Mirela Lavric	Romania	DNF	

=== Semifinals ===
First 3 in each heat advanced to the Final. The semifinals were held at 15:20.

Rank	Heat	Name	Nationality	Time	Notes
1	2	Jennifer Meadows	Great Britain	2:00.65	Q
DQ	2	Yevgeniya Zinurova	Russia	~~2:00.93~~	Q, Doping
2	2	Linda Marguet	France	2:01.32	Q, PB
DQ	2	Tetyana Petlyuk	Ukraine	~~2:02.19~~	Doping
3	1	Eglė Balčiūnaitė	Lithuania	2:02.44	Q
DQ	1	Yuliya Rusanova	Russia	~~2:02.48~~	Q, Doping
4	1	Marilyn Okoro	Great Britain	2:02.65	Q, SB
5	2	Jana Hartmann	Germany	2:02.65	
6	1	Liliya Lobanova	Ukraine	2:02.67	
7	1	Élian Périz	Spain	2:03.31	PB
8	2	Yeliz Kurt	Turkey	2:03.32	
9	1	Tatyana Paliyenko	Russia	2:03.41	

=== Final ===
The final was held at 16:00.

Rank	Lane	Name	Nationality	Time	Notes
1st place, gold medalist(s)	5	Jennifer Meadows	Great Britain	2:00.50	
2nd place, silver medalist(s)	6	Linda Marguet	France	2:01.61	
3rd place, bronze medalist(s)	1	Marilyn Okoro	Great Britain	2:02.46	SB
4	2	Eglė Balčiūnaitė	Lithuania	2:04.86	
DQ	4	Yevgeniya Zinurova	Russia	~~2:00.19~~	Doping
DQ	3	Yuliya Rusanova	Russia	~~2:00.80~~	Doping
