= Alysia Montaño =

American middle-distance runner

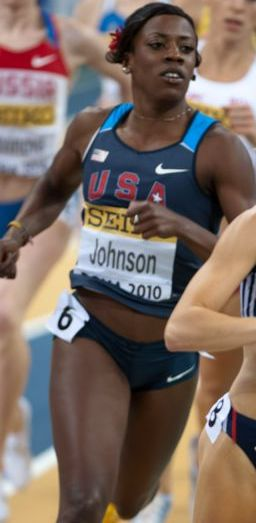
- Montaño at the 2010 World Indoor Championships in Athletics.

Personal information
- Nationality: American
- Born: April 23, 1986 (age 40) Queens, New York, U.S.
- Height: 5 ft 7 in (1.70 m)

Sport
- Sport: Running

Achievements and titles
- Personal bests: 400m: 52.09; 800m: 1:57.34
Medal record
Women's athletics
Representing United States
Summer Olympics
Bronze medal – third place	2012 London	800 m
World Championships
Bronze medal – third place	2011 Daegu	800 m
Bronze medal – third place	2013 Moscow	800 m
World Indoor Championships
Bronze medal – third place	2010 Doha	800 m
World Relay Championships
Gold medal – first place	2015 Nassau	4 × 800 m relay
Pan American Games
Gold medal – first place	2015 Toronto	4 × 400 relay
Silver medal – second place	2015 Toronto	800 m

Alysia Montaño (née Johnson) (born April 23, 1986) is an American middle distance runner. She is a six-time USA Outdoor Track and Field Championships 800 metres champion (2007, 2010, 2011, 2012, 2013 and 2015). She gained significant publicity for the 2014 race that she competed while 8 months pregnant.

== Career ==
Alysia Johnson moved to California from New York when she was 3 years old. She played soccer and ran cross country through high school. She ran for Canyon High School in Santa Clarita, California, with her high school career culminating in winning the 800 meters at the CIF California State Meet in 2004. That year she was ranked #10 in the nation and finished fourth at the Golden West Invitational, a meet that proclaims itself to be a National championship of High School Track and Field.

At the University of California, Berkeley, she continued to improve. By 2006, she finished 3rd at the NCAA Women's Outdoor Track and Field Championships, setting personal bests three times during the competition. 2007 put her on the national stage, winning the NCAA Indoor Championship, the Outdoor Championship and breaking the 2 minute barrier.

At the 2007 USA Outdoor Track and Field Championships, Montaño won her first national title in the 800 m with a time of 1:59.47. At the 2007 World Athletics Championships, Montaño was eliminated in the heats of the 800 m by finishing 4th with a time of 2:02.11.

At the 2010 IAAF World Indoor Championships, Montaño won her first international medal, a bronze, in the 800 m, finishing with a personal best time of 1:59.60. At the 2011 USA Outdoor Track and Field Championships, Montaño won the 800 m title in a time of 1:58.33 to defend her 2010 crown. She placed third at that year's World Championships in Daegu with her second fastest time of 1:57.48 minutes after Doping in Russia scandals elevated her, and she was awarded her medals at the 2019 World Athletics Championships in Qatar.

She came close to a personal best at the 2012 Prefontaine Classic, winning the 800 m in 1:57.37 minutes. At the 2012 Olympics, the front running Montaño held the lead until the kickers ran past her in the closing stages of the race, ultimately holding on to fifth place. In 2017, one of them, Mariya Savinova, was disqualified for doping, elevating her to fourth place. The upgraded winner, Ekaterina Poistogova, also of Russia (but later Turkiye after her marriage and World Athletics regulations after 2022), was disqualified on 6 June 2025, moving her to third place. Once the IOC officially reallocates medals, she intends to receive her bronze medal at the 2028 Olympic Games in Los Angeles during the Medal Reallocation Ceremony.

She won the 2013 Milrose Games 600 meters and set an American Indoor Record of 1:23.59 on February 16.

Won 2013 Penn Relays 4 × 800 meters and set American Outdoor Record in 8:04.31 on April 27. Lea Wallace (2:02.0), Brenda Martinez (2:00.6), Ajeé Wilson (2:03.1), Alysia Montano (1:58.6). Again at the 2013 World Championships, Montaño finished fourth after leading and being passed in the closing stage of the race. For the third major championship in a row, a Russian athlete, Mariya Savinova finished ahead of her. With Savinova's lifetime ban for doping, this resulted into another bronze medal for Montaño when the medals were reallocated.

Alysia Montaño earned a silver medal at Athletics at the 2015 Pan American Games – Women's 800 metres in 1:59.76 the day after running a 50-point 400 meters relay leg in Athletics at the 2015 Pan American Games – Women's 4 × 400 metres relay.

Alysia Montaño did not qualify for the 2016 Rio de Janeiro Olympics after falling in the USA Olympic trial finals.

== Major competition record ==
Year	Competition	Venue	Position	Event	Notes
Representing United States
2006	NACAC U23 Championships	Santo Domingo, Dominican Republic	1st	800 m	2:03.87
2007	Pan American Games	Rio de Janeiro, Brazil	6th	800 m	2:02.57
2007	World Championships	Osaka, Japan	29th (h)	800 m	2:02.11
2010	World Indoor Championships	Doha, Qatar	3rd	800 m	1:59.60
2011	World Championships	Daegu, South Korea	3rd	800 m	1:57.48
2012	Olympic Games	London, United Kingdom	3rd	800 m	1:57.93
2013	World Championships	Moscow, Russia	3rd	800 m	1:57.95
2015	World Relay Championships	Nassau, Bahamas	1st	4 × 800 m relay	8:00.62 (AR)
2015	Pan American Games	Toronto, Ontario	1st	4 × 400 m relay	3:26.40 semifinal
2015	World Championships	Beijing, China	41st (h)	800 m	2:09.57

== Personal bests ==
As of June 2, 2013.

Event	Time	Venue	Date
400 m (outdoor)	52.09	Nuoro	July 14, 2010
600 m (indoor)	1:23.59 AR	New York City	February 16, 2013
800 m (outdoor)	1:57.34	Monaco	July 22, 2010
800 m (indoor)	1:59.60	Doha	March 14, 2010

== Racing while pregnant ==
Montaño garnered attention in June 2014 by competing in the USATF's USA Outdoor Track and Field Championships while eight months pregnant. She finished last in a field of 29 in the 800 meters preliminaries with a time of 2:32.13. She gave birth to Linnea Dori Montaño on August 15, 2014.

A year later in June 2015, Montaño returned and won the 800 meters final of the US Trials and qualified for the World Athletics Championships 2015 in Beijing.
