= Athletics at the 2012 Summer Olympics – Women's 800 metres =

Women's 800 metres at the Games of the XXX Olympiad
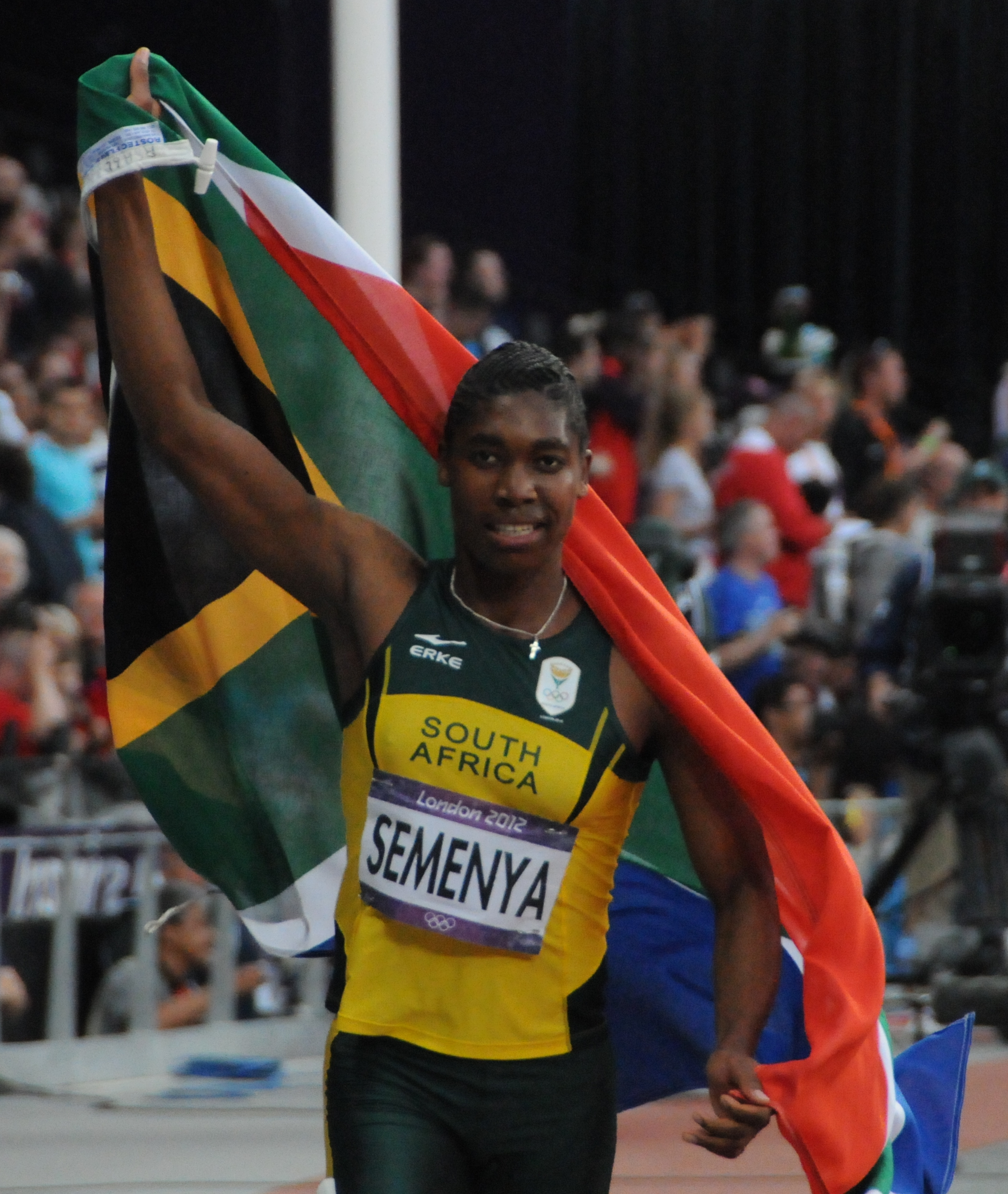
- Caster Semenya
- Venue: Olympic Stadium
- Date: 8–11 August
- Competitors: 45 from 35 nations
- Winning time: 1:56.19

Medalists
| 1st place, gold medalist(s) | | Caster Semenya | South Africa |
| 2nd place, silver medalist(s) | | Pamela Jelimo | Kenya |
| 3rd place, bronze medalist(s) | | Alysia Johnson Montaño | United States |

Official Video

The Women's 800 metres competition at the 2012 Summer Olympics in London, United Kingdom. The event was held at the Olympic Stadium on 8–11 August. Mariya Savinova finished the race in first place, but she has since been stripped of the gold medal for doping.

== Doping ==
In 2013, Russian Elena Arzhakova (who ran sixth) was found to have violations in her biological passport and was suspended backdated to July 2011, disqualifying her from the race.

On November 9, 2015, the Independent Commission Investigation of the World Anti-Doping Agency asked for a lifetime ban for doping for the Russians Mariya Savinova (who won gold) and Ekaterina Guliyev (Poustogova at the time, who won bronze). In February 2017, it was announced that Savinova was stripped of her gold medal. Guliyev was suspended in 2017 for 2 years, backdated to October 2014, but her London result was not affected. In April 2024, Guliyev was banned by the World Anti-Doping Agency for infractions in 2012 and 2013, voiding her results including the 2012 Olympic final. The official decision to revoke medals rests with the International Olympic Committee. Guliyev's medal was officially revoked on 6 June 2025, upgrading Pamela Jelimo to the silver and Alysia Montano to the bronze.

== Records ==
Prior to the competition, the existing world record, Olympic record, and world leading time were as follows:

| World record | Jarmila Kratochvílová (TCH) | 1:53.28 | Munich, West Germany | 26 July 1983 |
| Olympic record | Nadiya Olizarenko (URS) | 1:53.43 | Moscow, Soviet Union | 27 July 1980 |
| World leading | Pamela Jelimo (KEN) | 1:56.76 | Heusden-Zolder, Belgium | 7 July 2012 |

== Schedule ==
All times are British Summer Time (UTC+1)

| Date | Time | Round |
|---|---|---|
| Wednesday, 8 August 2012 | 11:35 | Round 1 |
| Thursday, 9 August 2012 | 19:30 | Semifinals |
| Saturday, 11 August 2012 | 20:00 | Finals |

== Competition format ==
The Women's 800m competition consisted of heats (Round 1), semifinals and a final. Twenty-four athletes advanced from the heats to the semifinal round. The top three competitors from each of the six heats qualified for the semifinals along with the six fastest losers. A total of eight competitors qualified for the Final from the semifinals. In the three semifinal races, the first two from each semifinal advanced to the final along with the two fastest losers.

== Race description ==
While heat 3 and heat 5 of the qualifying round allowed some athletes to run as slow as 2:07s or 2:08s and qualify, the semifinals were decidedly quicker. In heat 1, Pamela Jelimo and Ekaterina Guliyev (Poistogova at the time) managed to qualify virtually together in mid 1:59s, those were the slowest times. In heat two, 2009 World Champion Caster Semenya challenged the field, leading Elena Arzhakova, Janeth Jepkosgei Busienei and Alysia Johnson Montaño into the finals. Halima Hachlaf ran 1:58.84 and didn't make the final. In the third heat, virtual newcomer Francine Niyonsaba finished with 1:58.67 on the clock, a new national record for Burundi.

In the final, Montaño went to the front, with Jelimo and Jepkosgei Busienei on her shoulder, while Savinova and Semenya went to the back. The front-running Montaño hit the halfway mark in 56.31. Those positions held through 500 metres, when Jelimo charged out to a big lead down the back stretch, Montaño started to slow while Savinova started to move forward. At the 600 metre line, there was a confluence of runners moving forward meeting those moving backward. Savinova on the outside found herself in second place, though Jelimo had a 4-metre lead. Semenya was behind the wall of runners. In the next 100 metres, Savinova caught Jelimo, passing into the lead at the head of the straightaway and on to victory. Semenya was a full 10 metres back, but on the outside of traffic. As she went by, Montaño had slipped back to join a forward-moving Arzhakova. As Semenya went by, Montaño accelerated enough to separate herself from Arzhakova and held that until the finish in what would ordinarily be an also-ran position of fifth place. In the last 100, Semenya ran past the rest of the field, taking second place, but was too far behind to have a chance to catch Savinova; Guliyev edged a slacking Jelimo for third place.

== Result ==
Video on YouTube Official Video Highlights

=== Round 1 ===
Qual. rule: first 3 of each heat (Q) plus the 6 fastest times (q) qualified.

==== Heat 1 ====
| Rank | Athlete | Nation | Time | Notes |
|---|---|---|---|---|
| 1 | Alysia Johnson Montaño | United States | 2:00.47 | Q |
| 2 | Caster Semenya | South Africa | 2:00.71 | Q |
| 3 | Halima Hachlaf | Morocco | 2:00.99 | Q |
| 4 | Rose Mary Almanza | Cuba | 2:01.19 | q |
| 5 | Annabelle Lascar | Mauritius | 2:05.45 | PB |
| 6 | Elena Popescu | Moldova | 2:06.94 | |
| —N/a | Noura Elsayed | Egypt | —N/a | DNS |

==== Heat 2 ====
| Rank | Athlete | Nation | Time | Notes |
|---|---|---|---|---|
| ~~1~~ | ~~Mariya Savinova~~ | ~~Russia~~ | ~~2:01.56~~ | DSQ |
| 2 | Alice Schmidt | United States | 2:01.65 | Q |
| 3 | Tintu Luka | India | 2:01.75 | Q |
| 4 | Malika Akkaoui | Morocco | 2:01.78 | q |
| 5 | Andrea Ferris | Panama | 2:05.59 | |
| 6 | Haley Nemra | Marshall Islands | 2:14.90 | SB |
| 7 | Merve Aydın | Turkey | 3:24.35 | |

==== Heat 3 ====
| Rank | Athlete | Nation | Time | Notes |
|---|---|---|---|---|
| 1 | Francine Niyonsaba | Burundi | 2:07.57 | Q |
| 2 | Jessica Smith | Canada | 2:07.75 | Q |
| 3 | Genzeb Shumi | Bahrain | 2:07.77 | Q |
| 4 | Amina Bakhit | Sudan | 2:09.78 | |
| 5 | Amy Atkinson | Guam | 2:18.53 | NR |
| —N/a | Liliya Lobanova | Ukraine | —N/a | DNS |
| —N/a | Fantu Magiso | Ethiopia | —N/a | DNS |
| —N/a | Kenia Sinclair | Jamaica | —N/a | DNS |

==== Heat 4 ====
| Rank | Athlete | Nation | Time | Notes |
|---|---|---|---|---|
| 1 | Pamela Jelimo | Kenya | 2:00.54 | Q |
| 2 | Lynsey Sharp | Great Britain | 2:01.41 | Q |
| 3 | Eleni Filandra | Greece | 2:02.29 | Q |
| 4 | Geena Gall | United States | 2:03.85 | q |
| 5 | Cavela Felismina | Angola | 2:10.95 | PB |
| 6 | Rabia Ashiq | Pakistan | 2:17.39 | |
| —N/a | Yuliya Krevsun | Ukraine | —N/a | DNF |

==== Heat 5 ====
| Rank | Athlete | Nation | Time | Notes |
|---|---|---|---|---|
| 1 | Nataliia Lupu | Ukraine | 2:08.35 | Q |
| ~~2~~ | ~~Elena Arzhakova~~ | ~~Russia~~ | ~~2:08.39~~ | DSQ |
| 2 | Cherono Koech | Kenya | 2:08.43 | Q |
| 3 | Maryna Arzamasova | Belarus | 2:08.45 | |
| 4 | Lenka Masna | Czech Republic | 2:08.68 | |
| 5 | Melissa Bishop | Canada | 2:09.33 | |
| 6 | Aicha Fall | Mauritania | 2:27.97 | NR |
| 7 | Woroud Sawalha | Palestine | 2:29.16 | PB |

==== Heat 6 ====
| Rank | Athlete | Nation | Time | Notes |
|---|---|---|---|---|
| 1 | Janeth Jepkosgei | Kenya | 2:01.04 | Q |
| ~~2~~ | ~~Ekaterina Guliyev~~ | ~~Russia~~ | ~~2:01.08~~ | DSQ |
| 3 | Rosibel Garcia | Colombia | 2:01.30 | Q |
| 4 | Elena Mirela Lavric | Romania | 2:01.65 | q |
| 5 | Margarita Matsko | Kazakhstan | 2:02.12 | q |
| 6 | Neisha Bernard-Thomas | Grenada | 2:03.23 | q |
| 7 | Elisabeth Mandaba | Central African Republic | 2:12.56 | |
| 8 | Sarah Attar | Saudi Arabia | 2:44.95 | NR |

=== Semifinals ===
Qual. rule: first 2 of each heat (Q) plus the 2 fastest times (q) qualified.

==== Heat 1 ====
| Rank | Athlete | Nation | Time | Notes |
|---|---|---|---|---|
| 1 | Pamela Jelimo | Kenya | 1:59.42 | Q |
| ~~2~~ | ~~Ekaterina Guliyev~~ | ~~Russia~~ | ~~1:59.45~~ | DSQ |
| 3 | Rosibel Garcia | Colombia | 2:00.16 | SB |
| 4 | Alice Schmidt | United States | 2:01.63 | |
| 5 | Nataliia Lupu | Ukraine | 2:01.63 | |
| 6 | Rose Mary Almanza | Cuba | 2:01.70 | |
| 7 | Lynsey Sharp | Great Britain | 2:01.78 | |
| 8 | Eleni Filandra | Greece | 2:04.42 | |

==== Heat 2 ====
| Rank | Athlete | Nation | Time | Notes |
|---|---|---|---|---|
| 1 | Caster Semenya | South Africa | 1:57.67 | Q |
| ~~2~~ | ~~Elena Arzhakova~~ | ~~Russia~~ | ~~1:58.13~~ | DSQ |
| 2 | Janeth Jepkosgei | Kenya | 1:58.26 | q |
| 3 | Alysia Johnson Montaño | United States | 1:58.42 | q |
| 4 | Halima Hachlaf | Morocco | 1:58.84 | SB |
| 5 | Tintu Luka | India | 1:59.69 | SB |
| 6 | Elena Mirela Lavric | Romania | 2:00.46 | |
| 7 | Neisha Bernard-Thomas | Grenada | 2:00.68 | SB |

==== Heat 3 ====
| Rank | Athlete | Nation | Time | Notes |
|---|---|---|---|---|
| ~~1~~ | ~~Mariya Savinova~~ | ~~Russia~~ | ~~1:58.57~~ | DSQ |
| 2 | Francine Niyonsaba | Burundi | 1:58.67 | Q, NR |
| 3 | Margarita Matsko | Kazakhstan | 1:59.20 | PB |
| 4 | Malika Akkaoui | Morocco | 2:00.32 | |
| 5 | Cherono Koech | Kenya | 2:00.53 | SB |
| 6 | Genzeb Shumi | Bahrain | 2:01.76 | |
| 7 | Jessica Smith | Canada | 2:01.90 | |
| 8 | Geena Gall | United States | 2:05.76 | |

=== Final ===
| Rank | Lane | Athlete | Nation | Time | Notes |
|---|---|---|---|---|---|
| 1st place, gold medalist(s) | 7 | Caster Semenya | South Africa | 1:57.23 | SB |
| 2nd place, silver medalist(s) | 6 | Pamela Jelimo | Kenya | 1:57.59 | |
| 3rd place, bronze medalist(s) | 4 | Alysia Johnson Montaño | United States | 1:57.93 | |
| 4 | 3 | Francine Niyonsaba | Burundi | 1:59.63 | |
| 5 | 8 | Janeth Jepkosgei | Kenya | 2:00.19 | |
| —N/a | ~~5~~ | ~~Mariya Savinova~~ | ~~Russia~~ | ~~1:56.19~~ | DQ (doping) |
| —N/a | ~~2~~ | ~~Ekaterina Guliyev~~ | ~~Russia~~ | ~~1:57.53~~ | DQ (doping) |
| —N/a | ~~9~~ | ~~Elena Arzhakova~~ | ~~Russia~~ | ~~1:59.21~~ | DQ (doping) |
