= Jessica Smith (runner) =

Canadian middle-distance runner

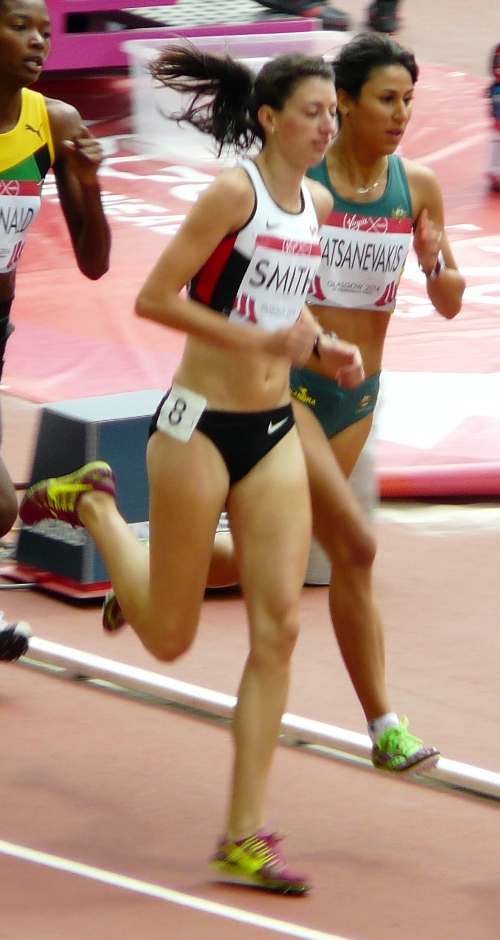
- Jessica Smith at the 2014 Commonwealth Games

Personal information
- Born: 11 October 1989 (age 36) Vancouver, Canada

Sport
- Sport: Track and field
- Event: 800 metres

Jessica Lorene Smith (born October 11, 1989 in Vancouver, British Columbia) is a Canadian track and field athlete who specialises in the 800 metres. She competed in the 800m event at the 2012 Summer Olympics, but was eliminated at the semi-final stage. Smith also participated in the 800m event at the 2015 Pan American Games where she finished in 5th place.

== Achievements ==
- 1st, Vancouver Sun Harry Jerome Track Classic, Burnaby, Canada (Olympic 'A' Standard).
- Personal Best: 1:59:86; Burnaby, CAN 10/06/2012.
