= Angelika Cichocka =

Polish middle-distance runner (born 1988)

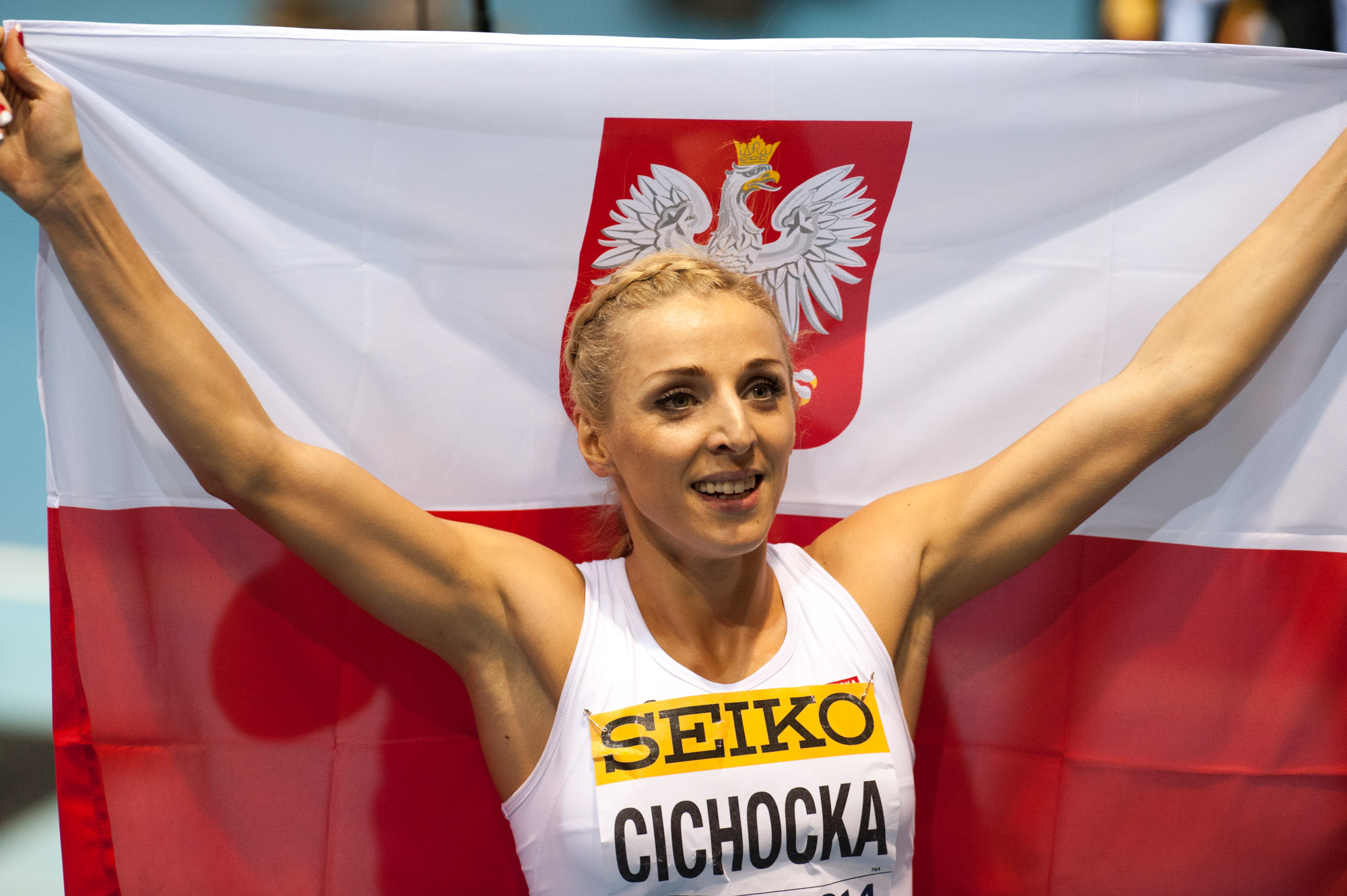
- Cichocka at the 2014 World Indoor Championships in Sopot

Personal information
- Full name: Angelika Cichocka
- Born: 15 March 1988 (age 38) Kartuzy, Poland
- Height: 1.68 m (5 ft 6 in)
- Weight: 55 kg (121 lb)

Sport
- Country: Poland
- Sport: Athletics
- Event: Middle distance running
- Club: ULKS Talex Borysław Borzytuchom
- Coached by: Tomasz Lewandowski
Medal record
Women's athletics
Representing Poland
World Indoor Championships
Silver medal – second place	2014 Sopot	800 m
European Championships
Gold medal – first place	2016 Amsterdam	1500 m
European Indoor Championships
Silver medal – second place	2015 Prague	1500 m
Bronze medal – third place	2021 Toruń	800 m
World Relay Championships
Silver medal – second place	2015 Nassau	4x800 m relay
Bronze medal – third place	2015 Nassau	Distance medley relay

Angelika Cichocka (pronounced: [an.d͡ʐɛˈli.ka t͡ɕiˈxɔt͡s.ka]; born 15 March 1988) is a Polish athlete who specializes in middle-distance running. She won the silver medal in the 800 metres at the 2014 World Indoor Championships, a gold in the 1500 metres at the 2016 European Championships, a silver for the same event at the 2015 European Indoor Championships, and a bronze for the 800 m at the 2021 European Indoor Championships.

Cichocka beat Sifan Hassan representing the Netherlands en route to her 1500 metres gold at the 2016 European Athletics Championships.

== International competitions ==
Representing Poland
Year	Competition	Venue	Position	Event	Time
2007	European Junior Championships	Hengelo, Netherlands	12th (h)	800 m	2:07.83
2009	European U23 Championships	Kaunas, Lithuania	8th	1500 m	4:17.41
2010	World Indoor Championships	Doha, Qatar	—	800 m	DSQ
2010	European Championships	Barcelona, Spain	13th (h)	800 m	2:01.17
2011	European Team Championships	Stockholm, Sweden	7th	800 m	2:01.75
2012	World Indoor Championships	Istanbul, Turkey	5th	1500 m	4:14.57
2012	European Championships	Helsinki, Finland	17th (h)	1500 m	4:14.59
2013	European Indoor Championships	Gothenburg, Sweden	8th (h)	1500 m	4:14.00
2013	Jeux de la Francophonie	Nice, France	6th	800 m	2:04.04
2013	Jeux de la Francophonie	Nice, France	3rd	1500 m	4:19.37
2014	World Indoor Championships	Sopot, Poland	2nd	800 m	2:00:45
2014	European Championships	Zürich, Switzerland	21st (h)	800 m	2:04.41
2015	European Indoor Championships	Prague, Czech Republic	2nd	1500 m	4:10.53
2015	World Relays	Nassau, Bahamas	2nd	4 × 800 m relay	8:11:36
2015	World Relays	Nassau, Bahamas	3rd	Distance medley relay	10:45.32
2015	World Championships	Beijing, China	8th	1500 m	4:13.22
2016	European Championships	Amsterdam, Netherlands	1st	1500 m	4:33.00
2016	Olympic Games	Rio de Janeiro, Brazil	20th (sf)	800 m	2:01.29
2016	Olympic Games	Rio de Janeiro, Brazil	24th (sf)	1500 m	4:17.83
2017	World Relays	Nassau, Bahamas	4th	4 × 800 m relay	8:24.71
2017	World Championships	London, United Kingdom	6th	800 m	1:58.41
2017	World Championships	London, United Kingdom	7th	1500 m	4:04.16
2018	World Indoor Championship	Birmingham, United Kingdom	7th (h)	800 m	2:02.25
2018	European Championships	Berlin, Germany	12th (sf)	800 m	2:03.14
2018	European Championships	Berlin, Germany	12th	1500 m	4:10.93
2021	European Indoor Championships	Toruń, Poland	3rd	800 m	2:04.15
2022	World Indoor Championships	Belgrade, Serbia	8th (h)	800 m	2:02.01

== Personal bests ==
- 800 metres – 1:58.41 (London 2017)
  - 800 metres indoor – 2:00.37 (Sopot 2014)
- 1000 metres – 2:34.84 (Sopot 2016)
- 1500 metres – 4:01.61 (Paris 2017)
  - 1500 metres indoor – 4:06.35 (Düsseldorf 2018)
- Mile – 4:19.58 (London 2017) NR
