= Athletics at the 2015 Pan American Games – Women's 800 metres =

Women's 800 metres at the 2015 Pan American Games
- Venue: CIBC Pan Am and Parapan Am Athletics Stadium
- Dates: July 21–22
- Competitors: 14 from 9 nations
- Winning time: 1:59.62

Medalists
Gold medal	Melissa Bishop	Canada
Silver medal	Alysia Montaño	United States
Bronze medal	Flávia de Lima	Brazil

The women's 800 metres sprint competition of the athletics events at the 2015 Pan American Games will take place between the 21 and 22 of July at the CIBC Pan Am and Parapan Am Athletics Stadium in Toronto, Canada. The defending Pan American Games champion is Adriana Muñoz of Cuba.

== Records ==
Prior to this competition, the existing world and Pan American Games records were as follows:

World record	Jarmila Kratochvilova (CZE)	1:53.28	Munich, Germany	July 26, 1983
Pan American Games record	Ana Quirot (CUB)	1:58.71	Havana, Cuba	August 8, 1991

== Qualification ==
Each National Olympic Committee (NOC) was able to enter up to two entrants providing they had met the minimum standard (2.06.00) in the qualifying period (January 1, 2014 to June 28, 2015).

== Schedule ==
Date	Time	Round
July 21, 2015	18:45	Semifinals
July 22, 2015	19:30	Final

== Results ==
All times shown are in seconds.

KEY:	q	Fastest non-qualifiers	Q	Qualified	NR	National record	PB	Personal best	SB	Seasonal best	DQ	Disqualified

=== Semifinals ===
Rank	Heat	Name	Nationality	Time	Notes
1	1	Flávia de Lima	Brazil	2:02.39	Q
2	1	Alysia Montaño	United States	2:02.95	Q
3	1	Jessica Smith	Canada	2:03.34	Q
4	1	Gabriela Medina	Mexico	2:03.94	q
5	2	Rose Mary Almanza	Cuba	2:04.39	Q
6	2	Melissa Bishop	Canada	2:04.51	Q
7	2	Phoebe Wright	United States	2:04.88	Q
8	2	Kimarra McDonald	Jamaica	2:05.72	q
9	2	Erika Lima	Brazil	2:06.44	
10	1	Alena Brooks	Trinidad and Tobago	2:07.82	
11	2	Cristina Guevara	Mexico	2:08.11	SB
12	2	Sonia Gaskin	Barbados	2:09.01	
13	1	Alethia Marrero	Puerto Rico	2:11.39	
14	1	Sahily Diago	Cuba	2:13.72	

=== Final ===
Rank	Lane	Name	Nationality	Time	Notes
1st place, gold medalist(s)	4	Melissa Bishop	Canada	1:59.52	
2nd place, silver medalist(s)	3	Alysia Montaño	United States	1:59.76	
3rd place, bronze medalist(s)	7	Flávia de Lima	Brazil	2:00.40	PB
4	5	Rose Mary Almanza	Cuba	2:01.82	
5	8	Jessica Smith	Canada	2:03.02	
6	1	Gabriela Medina	Mexico	2:03.91	
7	6	Phoebe Wright	United States	2:04.17	
8	2	Kimarra McDonald	Jamaica	2:04.37	
