= 1982 European Athletics Indoor Championships – Women's 1500 metres =

The women's 1500 metres event at the 1982 European Athletics Indoor Championships was held on 7 March.

== Results ==
Rank	Name	Nationality	Time	Notes
1st place, gold medalist(s)	Gabriella Dorio	Italy	4:04.01	NR
2nd place, silver medalist(s)	Brigitte Kraus	West Germany	4:04.22	
3rd place, bronze medalist(s)	Beate Liebich	East Germany	4:06.70	NR
4	Vesela Yatsinska	Bulgaria	4:11.75	
5	Nadezhda Ralldugina	Soviet Union	4:12.66	
6	Natalya Boborova	Soviet Union	4:14.28	
7	Elise Wattendorf	Switzerland	4:20.04	
8	Rossella Gramola	Italy	4:20.79	
9	Totka Petrova	Bulgaria	4:25.33	
