= Yvonne Hak =

Dutch middle-distance runner

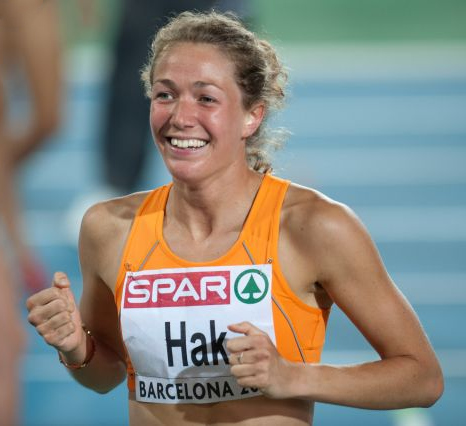
- Hak at the 2010 European Championships

Personal information
- Nationality: Dutch
- Born: 30 June 1986 (age 40) Alkmaar, Netherlands
Medal record
Women's athletics
Representing Netherlands
European Championships
Gold medal – first place	2010 Barcelona	800 metres

Yvonne Hak (Dutch pronunciation: [iˈvɔnə ˈɦɑk]; born 30 June 1986) is a Dutch middle-distance runner, who specialises in the 800 metres. She won gold at the 2010 European Athletics Championships.

== Early life ==
Yvonne Hak was born on 30 June 1986 in Alkmaar in the Netherlands.

== Athletics career ==
She took part in the under-23 race at the 2006 European Cross Country Championships and was 63rd overall, helping the Dutch women's team to fourth place. She won the 800 m for the Netherlands at the 2008 European Cup in Annecy, France. She made her breakthrough into the senior ranks in 2009. At the 2009 European Athletics Indoor Championships she reached the semi-finals of the 800 m and then won at the 2009 European Team Championships First League meet (where she also helped the Dutch 4×400 metres relay team to the bronze medal.

Hak gained her first victory on the major circuit with a close win over Egle Balciunaite, running 2:00.53, at the Golden Spike Ostrava meeting. She managed only the bronze medal at the 2010 European Team Championships, but greater success came at the 2010 European Athletics Championships. At the major championships in Barcelona she ran a personal best of 1:58.85 in the 800 m to win the silver medal behind Mariya Savinova, making her the first Dutch athlete to medal in the event since Gerda Kraan in 1962 European Athletics Championships. Her first major medal was unexpected for Hak: "It was a big surprise for me. My goal was to reach the final". Her new best also raised her to number three on the Dutch all-time lists behind Ellen van Langen and Stella Jongmans.

Awards
Preceded by Jolanda Keizer	Women's Dutch Athlete of the Year; 2010	Succeeded by Dafne Schippers
