= 2014 IAAF World Indoor Championships – Women's 800 metres =

The women's 800 metres at the 2014 IAAF World Indoor Championships took place on 7–9 March 2014.

== Medalists ==
Gold	Silver	Bronze
Chanelle Price; United States	Angelika Cichocka; Poland	Maryna Arzamasava; Belarus

== Records ==
Standing records prior to the 2014 IAAF World Indoor Championships
World record	Jolanda Čeplak (SLO)	1:55.82	Vienna, Austria	3 March 2002
Championship record	Ludmila Formanová (CZE)	1:56.90	Maebashi, Japan	7 March 1999
World Leading	Ajeé Wilson (USA)	2:00.43	Albuquerque, United States	23 February 2014
African record	Maria Mutola (MOZ)	1:57.06	Liévin, France	21 February 1999
Asian record	Miho Sugimori (JPN)	2:00.78	Yokohama, Japan	22 February 2003
European record	Jolanda Čeplak (SLO)	1:55.82	Vienna, Austria	3 March 2002
North and Central American and Caribbean record	Nicole Teter (USA)	1:58.71	New York City, United States	2 March 2002
Oceanian Record	Toni Hodgkinson (NZL)	2:00.36	Paris, France	9 March 1997
South American record	Letitia Vriesde (SUR)	1:59.21	Birmingham, Great Britain	23 February 1997
Records broken during the 2014 IAAF World Indoor Championships
World Leading	Angelika Cichocka (POL)	2:00.39	Sopot, Poland	7 March 2014
World Leading	Chanelle Price (USA)	2:00.09	Sopot, Poland	9 March 2014

== Qualification standards ==
Indoor	Outdoor
2:03.00	1:59.00

== Schedule ==
Date	Time	Round
7 March 2014	13:00	Heats
9 March 2014	16:35	Final

== Results ==
=== Heats ===
Qualification: The winner of each heat (Q) and next 3 fastest (q) qualified.

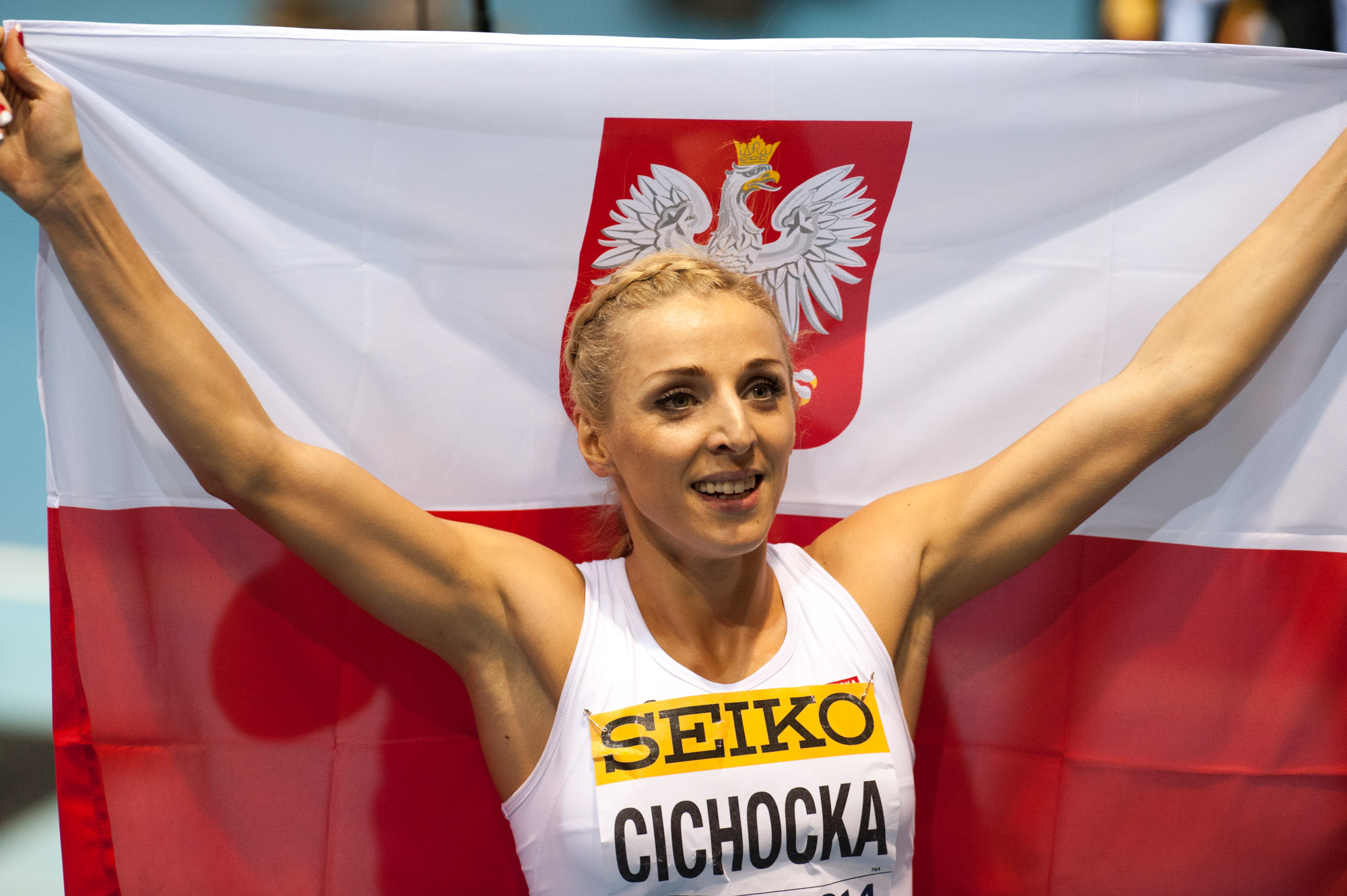
Angelika Cichocka won the silver medal

Rank	Heat	Name	Nationality	Time	Notes
1	1	Angelika Cichocka	Poland	2:00.37	Q, WL, PB
DQ	2	Nataliia Lupu	Ukraine	~~2:00.65~~	Q, ~~SB~~, Doping
2	3	Selina Büchel	Switzerland	2:00.93	Q, PB
3	3	Chanelle Price	United States	2:01.05	q
4	2	Maryna Arzamasava	Belarus	2:01.15	q, SB
5	3	Lenka Masná	Czech Republic	2:01.25	q, PB
6	2	Natoya Goule	Jamaica	2:01.89	PB
7	1	Laura Muir	Great Britain	2:02.55	
8	1	Olha Lyakhova	Ukraine	2:02.71	SB
9	2	Ajeé Wilson	United States	2:02.90	
10	2	Stina Troest	Denmark	2:02.95	PB
10	3	Anna Shchagina	Russia	2:02.95	
12	1	Yekaterina Kupina	Russia	2:03.17	
13	1	Roseanne Galligan	Ireland	2:03.30	
14	3	Jenna Westaway	Canada	2:03.52	
15	3	Ciara Everard	Ireland	2:03.69	SB
16	2	Malika Akkaoui	Morocco	2:06.04	
	1	Aníta Hinriksdóttir	Iceland	DQ	R163.3(b)

=== Final ===
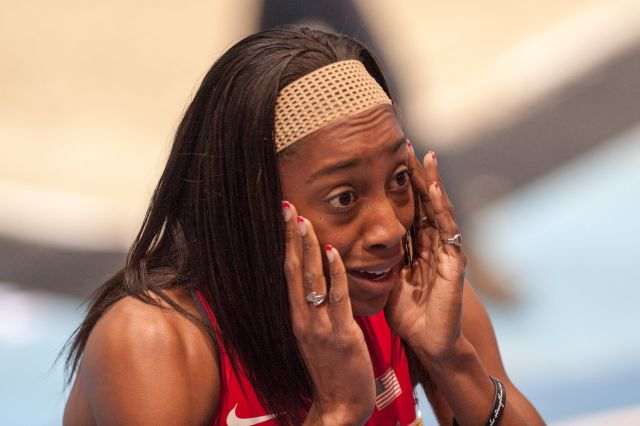
Chanelle Price after winning the final

Rank	Name	Nationality	Time	Notes
1st place, gold medalist(s)	Chanelle Price	United States	2:00.09	WL
2nd place, silver medalist(s)	Angelika Cichocka	Poland	2:00.45	
3rd place, bronze medalist(s)	Maryna Arzamasava	Belarus	2:00.79	PB
4	Selina Büchel	Switzerland	2:01.06	
DQ	Nataliia Lupu	Ukraine	2:01.17	R40.1
5	Lenka Masná	Czech Republic	2:02.46	
