= Ekaterina Guliyev =

Turkish track and field athlete

Ekaterina Guliyeva
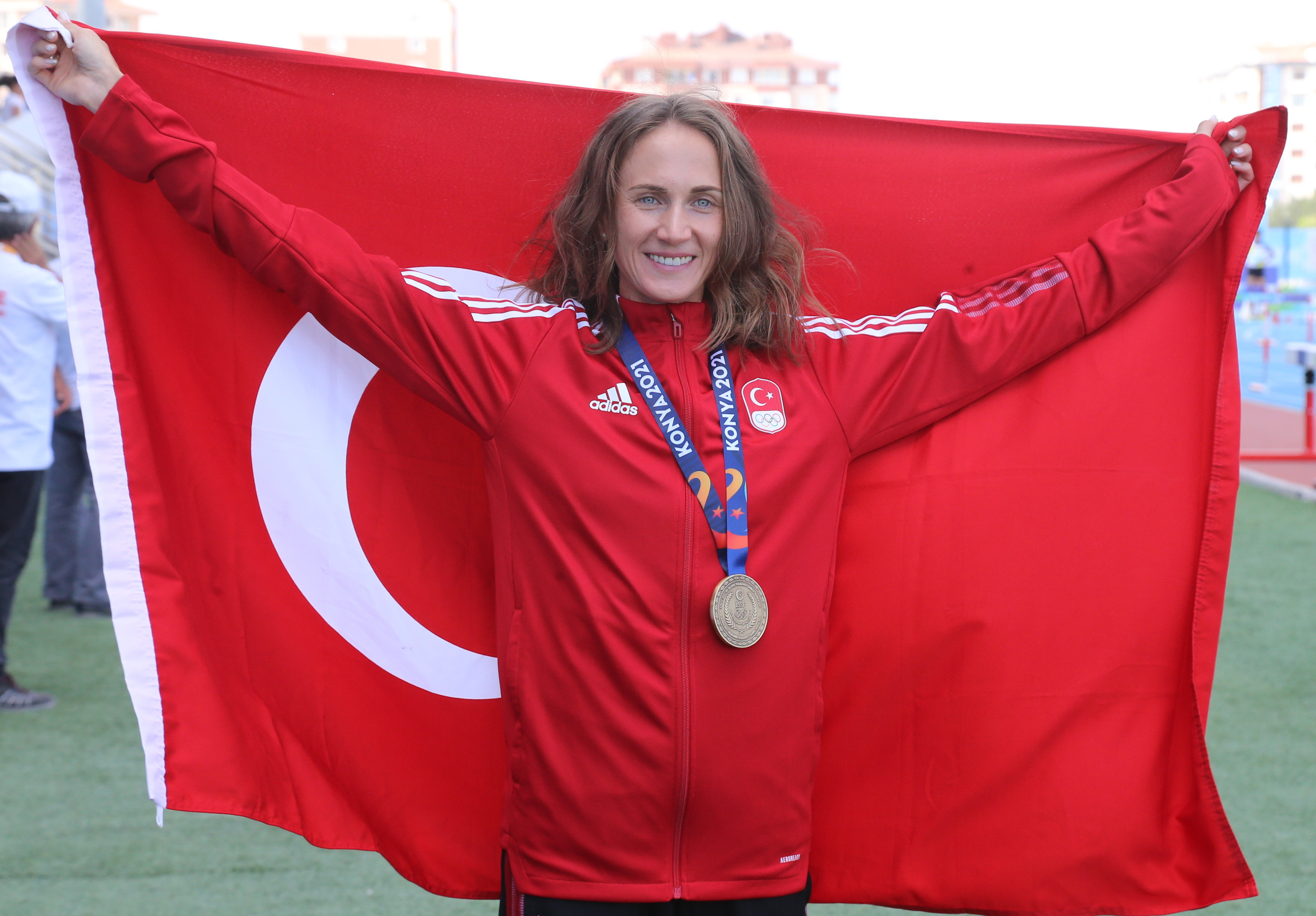
- Guliyeva at the 2021 Islamic Solidarity Games

Personal information
- Nationality: Russia, then Turkey
- Born: 1 March 1991 (age 35) Arzamas, Gorky Oblast, RSFSR, Soviet Union
- Height: 1.75 m (5 ft 9 in)
- Weight: 65 kg (143 lb)

Sport
- Sport: Women's athletics
- Event: 800 metres
Medal record
Olympic Games
Disqualified	2012 London	800 m
European Indoor Championships
Disqualified	2015 Prague	800 m

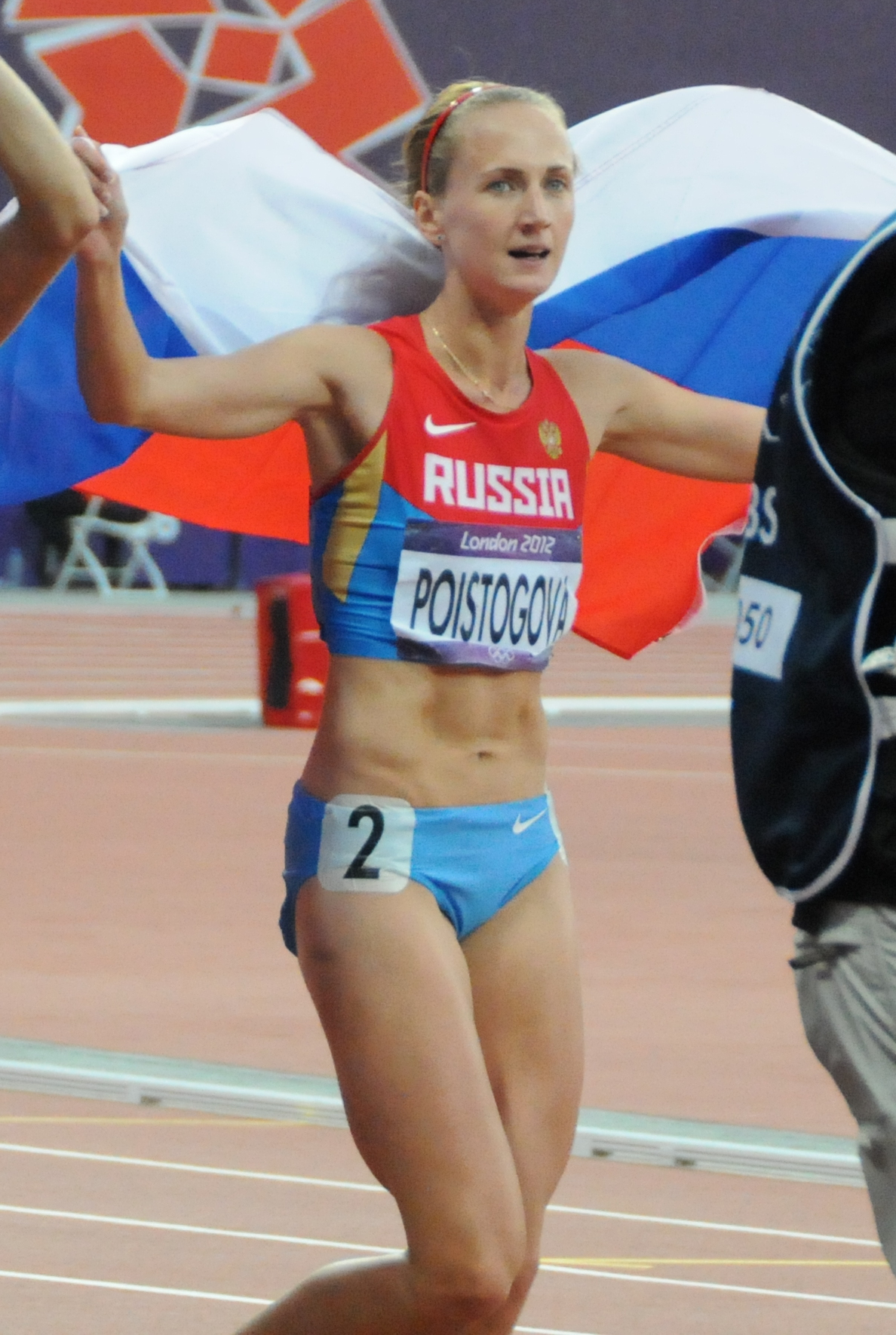
Carrying the Russian flag, Guliyeva celebrates her "win" at the 2012 Olympics

Ekaterina Guliyeva (née Zavyalova, divorced Poistogova; born 1 March 1991) is a Russian-born track and field athlete who specializes in the 800 metres and competes for Turkey.

== Career ==
In the 800 meters event at the 2012 Summer Olympics, Guliyeva placed second in her first-round heat with a time of 2:01.08. She then placed second in the semifinals with a time of 1:59.45. She won the bronze medal that day in the 800 m final with a time of 1:57.53 behind fellow Russian Mariya Savinova (1:56.19) and Caster Semenya of South Africa (1:57.23).

In November 2015, after an investigation that completed that year, Guliyeva (along with four other Russian runners) was recommended by the World Anti-Doping Agency to receive a retroactive lifetime ban for doping during the 2012 Olympics. On 7 April 2017, CAS refused to backdate disqualification as far back as 2012, and disqualified Guliyeva from 2015 onward. Her 2012 Olympic bronze medal was upgraded to silver after countrywoman Mariya Savinova's lifetime ban from competition due to doping, which annulled all of Savinova's results backdating to July 2010 and stripped Savinova's 2012 Olympic gold medal.

On 28 March 2024, twelve years after the London Games, the Court of Arbitration for Sport announced that Guliyev herself had been stripped of her medal, and banned for two years for further doping violations. All the competitive results from 17 July 2012 until 20 October 2014 are disqualified.

In early 2024, the Russian Athletic Federation annulled her results from July 2012 to October 2014 and banned her from competition for four years. She has been stripped of her 2012 Olympic 800m silver medal, according to sources.

== Personal life ==
Zavyalova was born in Arzamas in the USSR. After marrying fellow middle-distance runner Stepan Poistogov, she adopted the feminine form of his surname, Poistogova. She returned to her birth name following their divorce. In 2019, Zavyalova married sprinter Ramil Guliyev, and she gave birth to their daughter the following year.

== International competitions ==
Year	Competition	Venue	Position	Event	Notes
Representing Russia
2008	World Junior Championships	Bydgoszcz, Poland	19th (sf)	800 m	2:10.07
2010	World Junior Championships	Moncton, Canada	8th	800 m	2:05.56
2012	Olympic Games	London, United Kingdom	DSQ	800 m	~~1:57.53~~
2013	World Championships	Moscow, Russia	DSQ	800 m	~~1:58.05~~
2014	European Championships	Zürich, Switzerland	DSQ	800 m	~~1:59.69~~
2015	European Indoor Championships	Prague, Czech Republic	DSQ	800 m	~~2:01.99~~
Representing Turkey
2022	Balkan Championships	Craiova, Romania	3rd	800 m	2:02.38
2022	Mediterranean Games	Oran, Algeria	1st	800 m	2:01.08
2022	Mediterranean Games	Oran, Algeria	3rd	4 × 400 m relay	3:43.13
2022	Islamic Solidarity Games	Konya, Turkey	1st	800 m	2:02.28
2022	Islamic Solidarity Games	Konya, Turkey	2nd	1500 m	4:16.41
2022	Islamic Solidarity Games	Konya, Turkey	2nd	4 × 400 m relay	3:35.24
2022	European Championships	Munich, Germany	10th (sf)	800 m	2:01.32

== See also ==
- List of doping cases in athletics
- List of Olympic medalists in athletics (women)
- List of 2012 Summer Olympics medal winners
- Doping at the Olympic Games
- 800 metres at the Olympics
