= Victoria Griffiths =

English middle-distance runner

Victoria Griffiths (born 9 October 1984) is an English runner who specializes in the 800 metres.

At the 2002 World Junior Championships she won a silver medal in the 4 x 400 metres relay; however she only ran in the heats. She competed at the 2010 World Indoor Championships without reaching the final.

Her personal best time is 2:00.49 minutes, achieved in May 2008 in Manchester.
