= Jenny Meadows =

English athlete (born 1981)

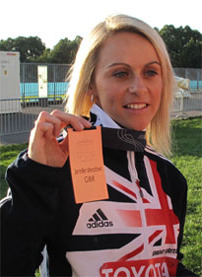
- Meadows with her bronze medal after the 2009 World Championships

Personal information
- Born: 17 April 1981 (age 45) Wigan, Greater Manchester, England
- Height: 1.52 m (5 ft 0 in)
- Weight: 47 kg (104 lb)

Sport
- Sport: Athletics
- Events: 800 metres, 400 m
- Club: Wigan & District Harriers
- Turned pro: 2004
- Coached by: Trevor Painter
- Retired: 2016
- Now coaching: Keely Hodgkinson

Achievements and titles
- Highest world ranking: 800 m: 3 (2009)
- Personal bests: 800 m: 1:57.93 (2009); 400 m: 52.67 (2003); Indoors; 800 m: 1:58.43i (2010)
Medal record
Women's athletics
Representing Great Britain
World Championships
Bronze medal – third place	2009 Berlin	800 m
Bronze medal – third place	2009 Berlin	4 × 400 m relay
World Indoor Championships
Silver medal – second place	2010 Doha	800 m
Diamond League
First place	2011	800 m
European Championships
Silver medal – second place	2010 Barcelona	800 m
European Indoor Championships
Gold medal – first place	2011 Paris	800 m
Silver medal – second place	2011 Paris	4 × 400 m relay
European Team Championships
Gold medal – first place	2011 Stockholm	800 m
Silver medal – second place	2009 Leiria	4 × 400 m relay
European Cup
Gold medal – first place	2008 Annecy	800 m
European U23 Championships
Gold medal – first place	2001 Amsterdam	4 × 400 m relay
Silver medal – second place	2003 Bydgoszcz	4 × 400 m relay
World Junior Championships
Gold medal – first place	2000 Santiago	4 × 400 m relay
Representing England
Commonwealth Games
Silver medal – second place	2002 Manchester	4 × 400 metres

Jennifer Brenda Meadows (born 17 April 1981) is a retired English athlete and current coach. Her main event was the 800 metres although earlier in her career she also competed for Great Britain over the 400 metres. In the 800 m she won a bronze medal at the 2009 World Championships and a silver at the 2010 World Indoor Championships. At the European Athletics Championships, Meadows took silver outdoors in 2010 and gold indoors in 2011. She also had international success as part of the Great Britain women's 4 × 400 metres relay squad.

Meadows was the 2011 Diamond League winner for the women's 800 metres, the first British woman to win the overall Diamond League in her event.

A notable indoor competitor, Meadows won one national title outdoors, but eight indoors, including one title over the shorter 400 metres distance.

Meadows has been noted as one of a number of athletes who were repeatedly denied major international medals by doping competitors in the early 2000's an 2010's, particularly from Russia. Her European title was awarded following the disqualification of the original Russian winner for doping.

Since her retirement from the track, Meadows has moved into commentary and coaching, founding the M11 training group with her husband, Trevor Painter, which includes Olympic, world indoor, European and European indoor champion over 800 metres, Keely Hodgkinson, World Indoor amd European 1500 m and Commonwealth Games 800 m champion Georgia Hunter Bell and European indoor 3000 m champion Sarah Healy. Meadows was joint winner, with Painter, of the BBC Sports Personality of the Year Coach of the Year award in 2024.

== Early career ==
In January 1989, seven-year-old Meadows joined Wigan & District Harriers. She was the 800 metres winner at the English Schools Junior (under 15 in this case) Championships in 1995. In 1998, she was third at the AAA Junior Indoor Championships in the 400 metres. She also finished second over the distance at the English Schools Championships.

The 18-year-old represented Great Britain in the women's 4 × 400 metres relay at the 1999 European Athletics Junior Championships in Riga. A year later, she ran the fastest leg of the women's 4 × 400 metres relay for the British team at the World Junior Championships held in Santiago, helping to secure the gold medal. In 2001 at the European Under-23 Championships in Amsterdam, she finished sixth in the 400 m, and gained a gold in the women's 4 × 400 m relay.

== Senior career ==
During the 2000s, she gradually shifted to the 800 metres distance as her specialist event. In 2002, she won her first senior British title in the indoor 800 m and a year later took gold in the indoor 400 m. Meadows was part of the England team at the 2002 Commonwealth Games in Manchester and won a silver medal in the 4 × 400 metres relay event with Helen Frost, Melanie Purkiss, Lisa Miller and Helen Karagounis.

Apart from relays at several major events, Meadows represented Great Britain at the 2001 European U23 Championships (400 m), 2002 European Indoor Championships (800 m), home 2003 World Indoor Championships (400 m), and 2003 European U23 Championships (400 m). She reached the 800 m semi-finals at the 2006 World Indoor Championships in Moscow in a time of 2:03.95; women's 4 × 400 m relay squad finished sixth.

The 25-year-old reached the final and placed fifth in the 800 m event at the European Indoor Championships Birmingham 2007, and went out of the competition in the semi-finals of the 2007 World Championships in Osaka, Japan with 1:59.39. This was Meadows' first season, when she ran under 2 minutes and she did it both indoors and outdoors.

=== 2008: Beijing Olympics ===
She finished fifth in the final of her new signature event at the World Indoor Championships in Valencia, Spain.

On 21 June 2008, in Annecy, Meadows achieved her first European Cup victory over the 800 m. On 18 July, she improved her personal best in the event to 1:59.11 at the Paris Golden League meeting. On 19 July, her place in the Beijing 2008 Great Britain Olympic Team was confirmed along with Marilyn Okoro and Jemma Simpson. Meadows qualified for the semi-final of the 800 m event at the Olympic Games after finishing 3rd in her heat with a time of 2.00.33, and in the semi itself ran close to her personal best in a time of 1.59.43, finishing in sixth place.

=== 2009: World bronze medallist ===
She had a successful indoor season during 2009 winning the UK Championships / European Indoor Trials, setting a new indoor personal best of 1.59.52 at the Birmingham Indoor Grand Prix, and finishing in fourth place in the European Indoor Championships in Turin, Italy.

On 27 July, her place in the Great Britain Team for the IAAF World Championships in Berlin, Germany in August was confirmed, along with Jemma Simpson and Marilyn Okoro. On 28 July, Meadows set a new outdoor personal best of 1.58.63 at the IAAF Super Grand Prix, Herculis in Monaco. On 19 August, she took the bronze medal in the World Championship 800 m final in a new lifetime best of 1.57.93, becoming the third-fastest British women of all time at the event. In a BBC interview after winning the bronze medal, Meadows commented: "It proves you should never say never, you should always believe in yourself. If you work hard and keep the faith, good things will happen."

=== 2010: World Indoor Championship & European Championship silver medals ===
Meadows started the season in great form and on 20 February broke the 7-year British indoor 800 m record, formerly held by Kelly Holmes, with a time of 1:59:11 in Birmingham. She went on to improve her record at the World Indoor Championships in Doha, Qatar on 14 March, where she was awarded the captaincy of the Great Britain team, and claimed the silver medal in 1:58.43.

At the European Championships in Barcelona, Meadows won a bronze, which was later upgraded to silver due to a doping offence by the Russian winner.

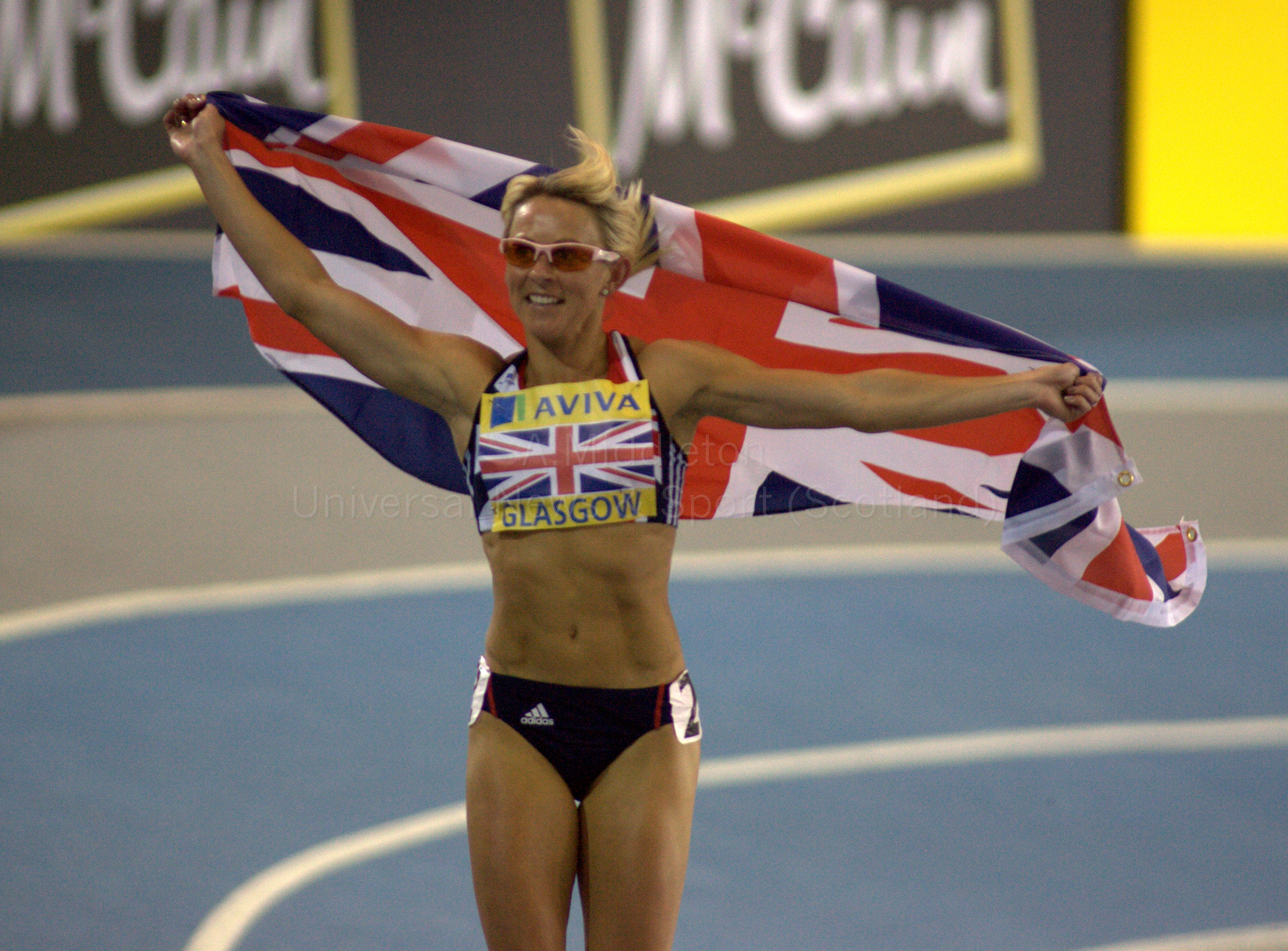
Meadows won the 800 m race at the Aviva International Match in Glasgow in 2011

=== 2011: European indoor champion & Diamond League winner ===
At the Paris European Indoor Championships, she earned two medals, securing the silver medal for the 800 m event and a silver as part of British women's 4 × 400 metres relay. As the Russian winner was eventually banned for doping, silver for her individual event was later promoted to gold.

On 31 July, at the age of 30, Meadows finally won her first British senior outdoor title with an 800 m victory at the Aviva National Championships in Birmingham to become national champion.

Meadows won three of the seven Diamond League 800 m races in 2011 – in Shanghai, Birmingham (promotional event) and London (earning $10,000 a win) – to win the overall Diamond League 800 m title. Each overall winner earned an additional $40,000 (US Dollars) in prize money.

She reached the semi-finals of the World Championships Daegu 2011 in South Korea (1:59.07). All three Russian finalists including Yuliya Stepanova, who denied Meadows qualification for the final from the semi, were later disqualified for doping.

=== 2012–13 ===
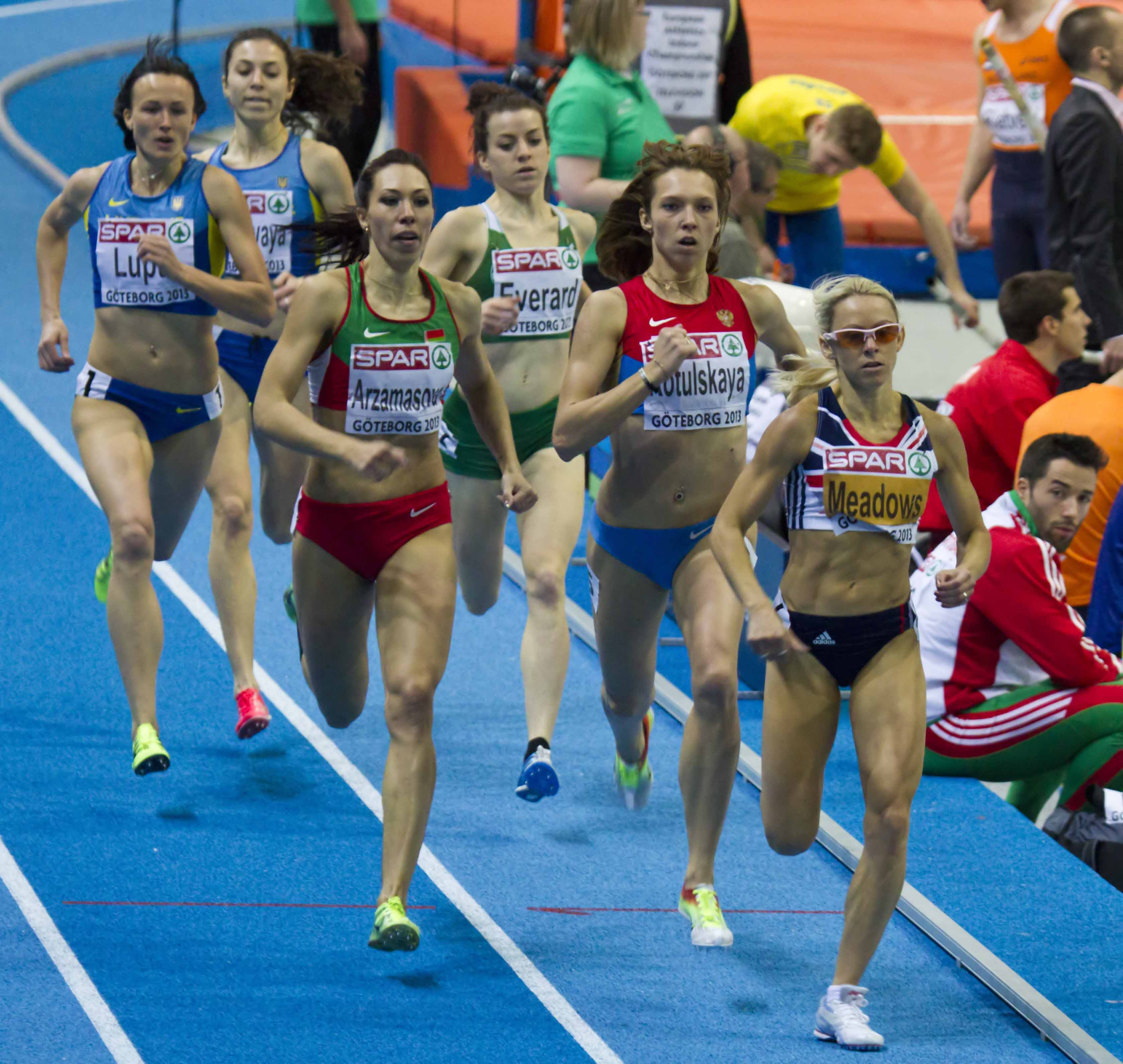
Meadows (far right) leads the pack at the 2013 European Indoor Championships in Gothenburg

Achilles injury in 2012 forced her to miss competing in her home London Olympics and in the whole season.

She only competed in two competitions in 2013. Much to the delight of the British fans, Meadows returned to action in February of that year (her first time since September 2011) and finished second at the British Indoor Grand Prix. She placed fourth in the final of the European Indoor Championships in Gothenburg in March, just months after undergoing ankle surgery. The following year, at least one athlete who finished ahead of her was banned for doping offences, however, the result of this event remained unchanged. In the summer of 2013, she injured in turn her thigh and was ruled out of the outdoor season, including 2013 World Championships.

=== 2014–2015 ===
Meadows returned to competition at the start of 2014, running the indoor season and then taking part in her first outdoor season since 2011. She steadily improved performances and on 16 June her place in the England Team for the XX Commonwealth Games in Glasgow was announced. At the British National Championships in June, she secured a bronze. She finished in sixth place at the Commonwealth Games.

She had the best indoor 800 m mark of the 2014/15 season in the world. She was a favourite for the title at the European Indoor Championships in Prague but days before the event contracted a heavy cold/flu and was not at her best. She ran the heats and semi-final but was not well enough to contest the final. Meadows described this as a real low of her career after battling back from injury and drugs cheats for a cold/flu to take away her victory this time. She competed throughout the rest of 2015 but was very disheartened by what she had faced the past few years. She was eliminated in the semi-finals at the World Championships Beijing 2015.

=== Retirement ===
The 35-year-old announced her retirement on 7 July 2016, after an injury sustained in the semi-final of the 2016 European Championships in Amsterdam meant that she would be unable to compete in the 2016 Rio Olympics.

== Non-competitive career ==
Meadows was head athletics coach for Manchester City Council before becoming a full-time athlete. She has appeared on the BBC's A Question of Sport in Matt Dawson's team on 13 March 2010, and on the BBC's Mastermind in December 2011, in which her specialist subject was Wigan Warriors.

In 2017, she worked as a pacemaker at major events, including IAAF Indoor Permit, IAAF World Challenge and Diamond League meets.

After retirement, Meadows has worked as a UK Athletics coach, athletics commentator and event host. She joined the BBC Sport team covering athletics at the 2016 Rio Olympics. She has worked as a commentator for World Athletics at least since 2019, as of 2022. She was a pundit on the BBC coverage of the 2022 European Athletics Championships.

Since 2019 Meadows has been a Director of Totally Runable Ltd, a company co-founded by Emily Freeman who work with schools using running to build confidence in sport. She is also part of Keely Hodgkinson's coaching team along with her husband Trevor Painter. Meadows and Painter jointly won the 2024 BBC Sports Personality of the Year Coach Award.

== Statistics ==
=== International competitions ===
Representing Great Britain / England
Year	Competition	Venue	Position	Event	Time
1999	European U20 Championships	Riga, Latvia	4th	4 × 400 m relay	3:36.62
2000	World U20 Championships	Santiago, Chile	11th (sf)	400 m	54.27
2000	World U20 Championships	Santiago, Chile	1st	4 × 400 m relay	3:33.82 WJL
2001	European U23 Championships	Amsterdam, Netherlands	6th	400 m	54.05
2001	European U23 Championships	Amsterdam, Netherlands	1st	4 × 400 m relay	3:31.74
2002	European Indoor Championships	Vienna, Austria	(h)	800 m i	DNF
2002	2002 Commonwealth Games	Manchester, United Kingdom	2nd	4 × 400 m relay	3:30.63 (Note: Time from the heats; Meadows was replaced in the final.)
2003	World Indoor Championships	Birmingham, United Kingdom	10th (sf)	400 m i	53.36
2003	World Indoor Championships	Birmingham, United Kingdom	4th	4 × 400 m relay i	3:32.18 NR
2003	European U23 Championships	Bydgoszcz, Poland	7th	400 m	53.17
2003	European U23 Championships	Bydgoszcz, Poland	2nd	4 × 400 m relay	3:30.44
2003	World Championships	Saint-Denis, France	6th	4 × 400 m relay	3:26.67
2004	World Indoor Championships	Budapest, Hungary	7th (h)	4 × 400 m relay i	3:33.30 SB
2006	World Indoor Championships	Moscow, Russia	9th (sf)	800 m i	2:03.95
2006	World Indoor Championships	Moscow, Russia	6th	4 × 400 m relay i	3:29.70
2006	European Championships	Gothenburg, Sweden	4th	4 × 400 m relay	3:27.92
2007	European Indoor Championships	Birmingham, United Kingdom	5th	800 m i	2:00.25
2007	World Championships	Osaka, Japan	11th (sf)	800 m	1:59.39 PB
2008	World Indoor Championships	Valencia, Spain	5th	800 m i	2:03.51
2008	European Cup	Annecy, France	1st	800 m	2:01.20
2008	Olympic Games	Beijing, China	15th (sf)	800 m	1:59.43
2008	World Athletics Final	Stuttgart, Germany	7th	800 m	2:00.80
2009	European Indoor Championships	Turin, Italy	4th	800 m i	2:00.42
2009	European Team Championships Super League	Leiria, Portugal	2nd	4 × 400 m relay	3:29.29
2009	World Championships	Berlin, Germany	3rd	800 m	1:57.93 PB
2009	World Championships	Berlin, Germany	3rd	4 × 400 m relay	3:25.23 SB
2009	World Athletics Final	Thessaloniki, Greece	3rd	800 m	2:00.41
2010	World Indoor Championships	Doha, Qatar	2nd	800 m i	1:58.43 NR
2010	European Championships	Barcelona, Spain	2nd	800 m	1:59.39
2011	European Indoor Championships	Paris, France	1st	800 m i	2:00.50
2011	European Indoor Championships	Paris, France	2nd	4 × 400 m relay i	3:31.36
2011	European Team Championships Super League	Stockholm, Sweden	1st	800 m	1:59.47
2011	World Championships	Daegu, South Korea	9th (sf)	800 m	1:59.07
2012	European Championships	Helsinki, Finland	–	800 m	DNS
2013	European Indoor Championships	Gothenburg, Sweden	4th	800 m i	2:01.52
2014	European Team Championships Super League	Braunschweig, Germany	7th	800 m	2:03.97
2014	Commonwealth Games	Glasgow, United Kingdom	6th	800 m	2:02.19
2015	European Indoor Championships	Prague, Czech Republic	– (f)	800 m i	DNS
2015	World Championships	Beijing, China	22nd (sf)	800 m	2:00.53
2016	European Championships	Amsterdam, Netherlands	17th (sf)	800 m	2:03.13

=== Circuit wins and titles ===
- Diamond League 800 m champion: 2011

800 metres wins.

- 2011: Shanghai Golden Grand Prix, British Grand Prix, London Grand Prix (SB)

=== National titles ===
- British Athletics Championships
  - 800 metres: 2011
- British Indoor Athletics Championships
  - 400 metres: 2003
  - 800 metres: 2002, 2005, 2006, 2008, 2009, 2010, 2015
