= 2015 European Athletics Indoor Championships – Women's 1500 metres =

Athletics competition in Europe

The women's 1500 metres event at the 2015 European Athletics Indoor Championships was held on 8 March at 16:10 local time as a straight final.

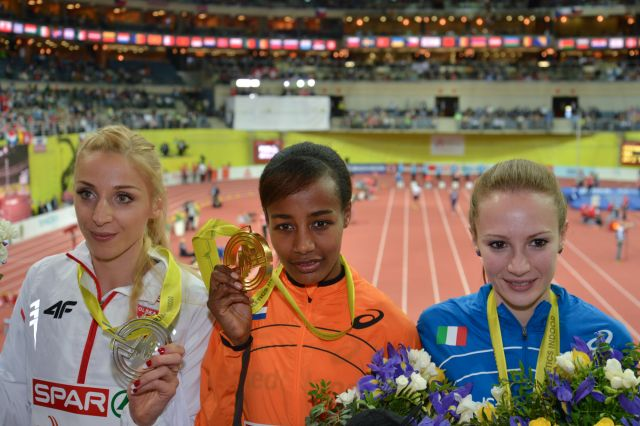
The medalists

== Medalists ==
Gold	Silver	Bronze
Sifan Hassan; Netherlands	Angelika Cichocka; Poland	Federica Del Buono; Italy

== Results ==
Rank	Athlete	Nationality	Time	Note
1st place, gold medalist(s)	Sifan Hassan	Netherlands	4:09.04	
2nd place, silver medalist(s)	Angelika Cichocka	Poland	4:10.53	
3rd place, bronze medalist(s)	Federica Del Buono	Italy	4:11.61	
4	Katarzyna Broniatowska	Poland	4:12.71	
5	Gesa Felicitas Krause	Germany	4:15.40	
6	Rosie Clarke	Great Britain	4:16.49	
7	Diana Mezuliáníková	Czech Republic	4:16.93	PB
8	Renata Pliś	Poland	4:16.96	
9	Florina Pierdevara	Romania	4:17.05	
10	Sonja Roman	Slovenia	4:20.85	
11	Silvia Danekova	Bulgaria	4:25.44	
