= Federica Del Buono =

Italian middle-distance runner

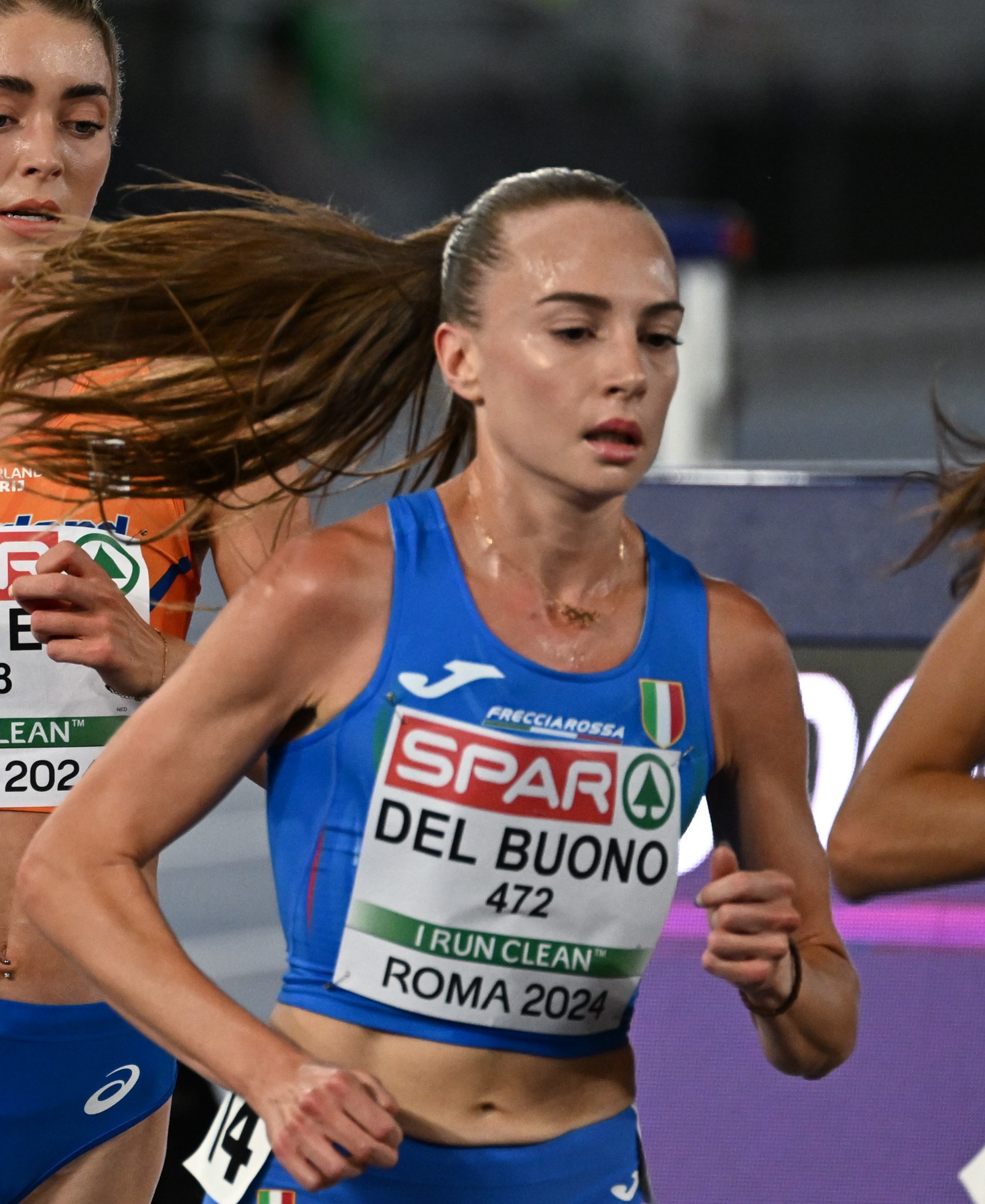
- Del Buono at Roma 2024

Personal information
- National team: Italy (4 caps)
- Born: 12 December 1994 (age 31) Vicenza, Veneto, Italy
- Height: 1.76 m (5 ft 9 in)
- Weight: 63 kg (139 lb)

Sport
- Country: Italy
- Sport: Athletics
- Event: Middle-distance running
- Club: C.S. Carabinieri
- Coached by: Rossella Gramola

Achievements and titles
- Personal bests: 800 m: 2:00.58 (2014); 800 m indoor: 2:05.64 (2015); 1500 m: 4:03.45 (2022); 1500 m indoor: 4:08.87 (2015); 3000 m: 9:01.38 (2014); 3000 m indoor: 9:01.19 (2015)
Medal record
Women's athletics
Representing Italy
European Cross Country Championships
| Gold medal – first place | 2024 Antalya | Team race |
European Indoor Championships
| Bronze medal – third place | 2015 Prague | 1500 m |
Mediterranean Games
| Gold medal – first place | 2026 Taranto | 10000 m |
| Silver medal – second place | 2022 Oran | 1500 m |

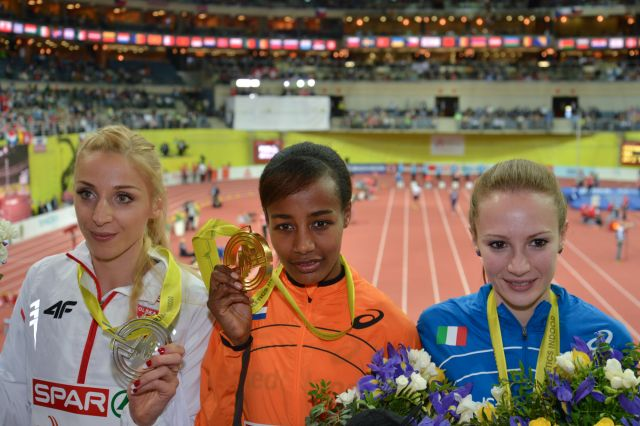
Del Buono (right) on the medal podium at the 2015 European Indoor Championships

Federica Del Buono (born 12 December 1994) is an Italian middle-distance runner who competes mainly in track events. She was the bronze medallist in the 1500 metres at the European Athletics Indoor Championships in 2015.

== Early life ==
Her parents Gianni Del Buono and Rossella Gramola were also two middle-distance runners. Born in Vicenza, Del Buono began training with her mother as coach and became a member of the Gruppo Sportivo Forestale sports club. Early in her life, she was more interested in dance, but began taking part in athletics in seriousness around 2011. She soon rose to prominence nationally and competed in the heats of the 1500 metres at the 2012 World Junior Championships in Athletics. Del Buono also ran over 4 km at the 2012 European Cross Country Championships, finishing 40th overall.

== Career ==
She has a personal best of 4:03.45 minutes for the event. She won the 2014 Italian national title and represented Italy at the 2014 European Athletics Championships. She competed at the 2020 Summer Olympics, in the 1500 m.

She won her first international medal at the inaugural 1500 m at the 2014 Mediterranean Athletics U23 Championships, beating Olympic medallist Gamze Bulut to the gold medal. A fourth place in senior competition followed at the 2014 European Team Championships Super League. She went on to be selected for the 1500 m at the 2014 European Athletics Championships, where she placed fifth in a personal best of 4:07.49 minutes. She won her first national title in the 1500 m at that year's Italian Athletics Championships.

The twenty-year-old Del Buono won her first senior medal at the 2015 European Athletics Indoor Championships. Competing over her specialty 1500 m, she took a clear third place for the bronze medal with a run of 4:11.61 minutes.

== Personal bests ==
Outdoor

- 800 metres – 2:00.58 (2014)
- 1500 metres – 4:03.45 (2022)
- 3000 metres – 9:01.38 (2014)

Indoor

- 1500 metres – 4:08.87 (2015)
- 3000 metres – 9:01.19 (2015)
- All information from IAAF.

== Achievements ==
| Year | Competition | Venue | Rank | Event | Time | Notes |
|---|---|---|---|---|---|---|
| 2012 | World Junior Championships | (Spain) Barcelona | 27th (h) | 1500 m | 4:28.66 | |
| 2014 | Mediterranean U23 Championships | (France) Aubagne | 1st | 1500 m | 4:14.20 | |
| 2014 | European Team Championships | (Germany) Braunschweig | 4th | 1500 m | 4:16.01 | |
| 2014 | European Championships | (Switzerland) Zürich | 5th | 1500 m | 4:07.49 | PB |
| 2015 | European Indoor Championships | (Czech Republic) Prague | 3rd | 1500 m | 4:11.61 | |
| 2021 | European Indoor Championships | (Poland) Toruń | 12th (h) | 1500 m | 4:12.79 | SB |
| 2021 | Olympic Games | (Japan) Tokyo | 29th (h) | 1500 m | 4:07.70 | SB |
| 2022 | Mediterranean Games | (Algeria) Oran | 2nd | 1500 m | 4:13.09 | |
| 2022 | World Championships | (United States) Eugene | 28th (h) | 1500 m | 4:08.42 | |
| 2022 | European Championships | (Germany) Munich | 23rd (h) | 1500 m | 4:08.14 | |
| 2023 | European Indoor Championships | (Turkey) Istanbul | 19th (h) | 1500 m | 4:23.59 | |
| 2024 | European Championships | (Italy) Rome | 7th | 5000 m | 15:00.25 | PB |
| 2024 | European Championships | (Italy) Rome | 4th | 10,000 m | 31:25.41 | PB |

== National titles ==
- Italian Athletics Championships
  - 1500 metres: 2014, 2024

== See also ==
- Italian all-time top lists - 800 m
- Italian all-time top lists - 1500 m
