= Rossella Gramola =

Italian middle-distance runner

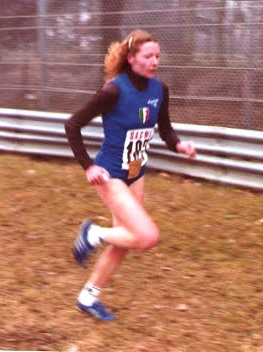

Personal information
- National team: Italy: 12 caps (1976-1984)
- Born: 3 August 1955 (age 70) Vicenza, Italy

Sport
- Sport: Athletics
- Event: Middle-distance running
- Club: Atletica Vicentina

Achievements and titles
- Personal bests: 800 m: 2:05.25 (1982); 1500 m: 4:16.30 (1983)

Rossella Gramola (born 3 August 1955) is a former Italian middle-distance runner who was 8th on 1500 m at the 1976 European Indoor Championships.

She is married to the Italian middle-distance runner Gianni Del Buono, and is the mother of the middle-distance runner Federica Del Buono.

== Achievements ==
Year	Competition	Venue	Rank	Event	Time	Notes
1982	European Indoor Championships	(Italy) Milan	8th	1500 m	4:20.79	

== National titles ==
Gramola won a national championship at individual senior level.

- Italian Athletics Indoor Championships
  - 800 m: 1982
