= Lenka Masná =

Czech runner

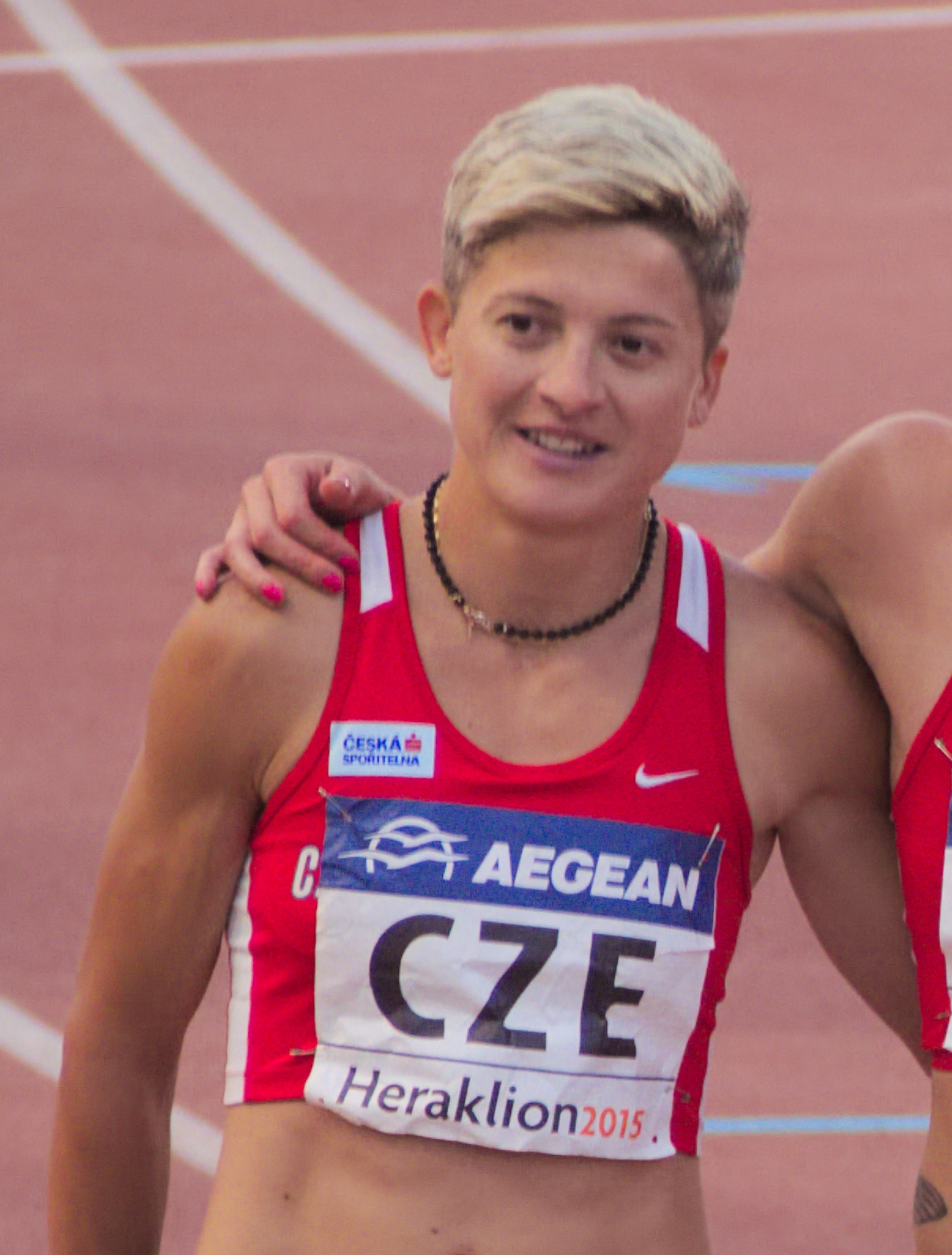
- Lenka Masná at 2015 European Team Championships First League

Medal record

Representing Czech Republic

Women's athletics

European Indoors Championships
Bronze medal – third place	2013 Gothenburg	4x400m relay

Lenka Masná (Czech pronunciation: [ˈlɛŋka ˈmasnaː]; born 22 April 1985 in Nový Jičín) is a Czech runner who specializes in the 800 metres.

She competed at the 2009 World Championships and the 2010 and 2012 World Indoor Championships and the 2012 Summer Olympics without reaching the final. After this she broke through to a higher performance level, reaching the final of the 2013 World Championships and the 2014 World Indoor Championships. In reaching the 2013 World Championships, she set a new personal best of 1:59.56.

== Competition record ==
Year	Competition	Venue	Position	Event	Notes
Representing Czech Republic
2007	European U23 Championships	Debrecen, Hungary	8th	800 m	2:04.17
2009	World Championships	Berlin, Germany	20th (sf)	800 m	2:02.55
2010	World Indoor Championships	Doha, Qatar	7th (h)	800 m	2:03.59
2010	European Championships	Barcelona, Spain	6th	800 m	1:59.91
2011	European Indoor Championships	Paris, France	14th (h)	800 m	2:06.65
2012	World Indoor Championships	Istanbul, Turkey	10th (h)	800 m	2:03.08
2012	European Championships	Helsinki, Finland	16th (h)	800 m	2:05.75
2012	Olympic Games	London, United Kingdom	28th (h)	800 m	2:08.68
2013	European Indoor Championships	Gothenburg, Sweden	9th (sf)	800 m	2:03.40
2013	European Indoor Championships	Gothenburg, Sweden	3rd	4 × 400 m relay	3.28.49
2013	World Championships	Moscow, Russia	8th	800 m	2:00.59
2014	World Indoor Championships	Sopot, Poland	6th	800 m	2:02.46
2014	European Championships	Zürich, Switzerland	9th (sf)	800 m	2:01.80
2015	European Indoor Championships	Prague, Czech Republic	11th (sf)	800 m	2:10.36
2017	European Indoor Championships	Belgrade, Serbia	13th (h)	800 m	2:05.64
