= Rose-Anne Galligan =

Irish athletics competitor

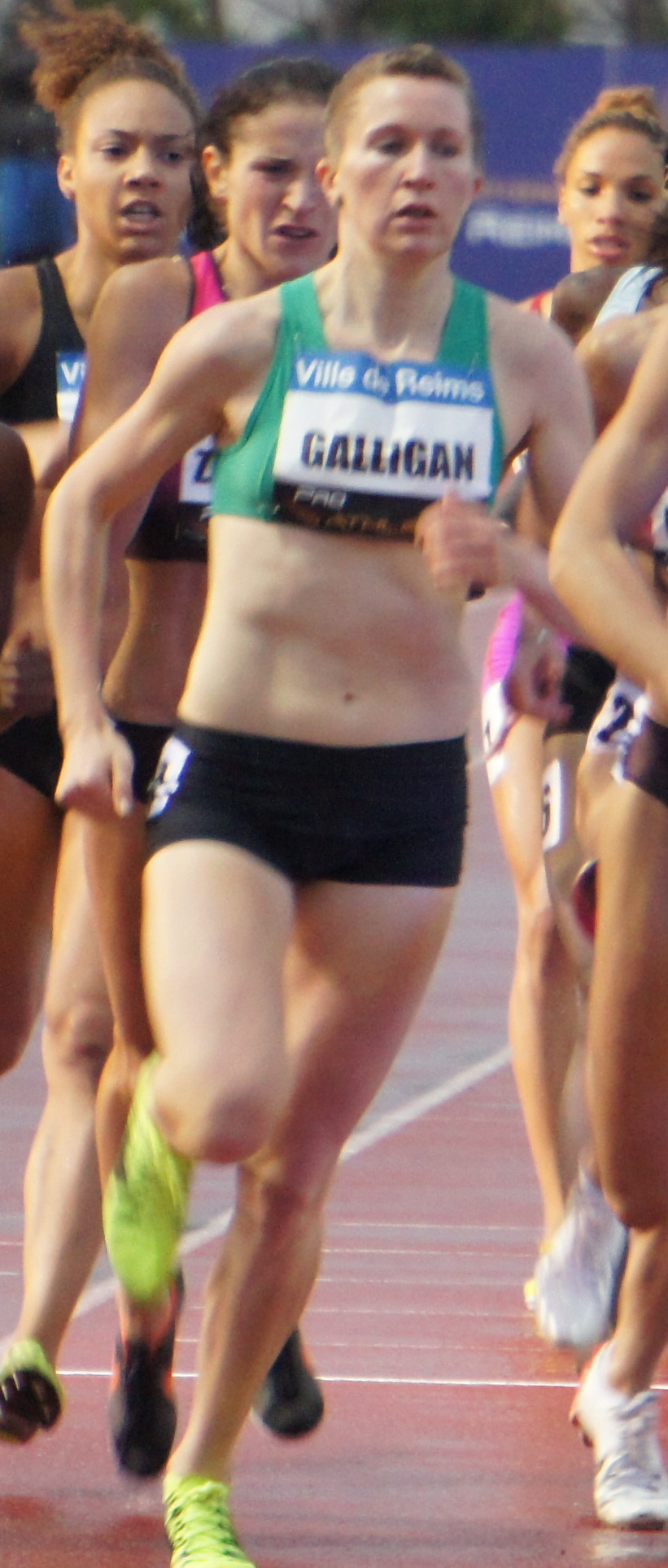
- Roseanne Galligan in 2013

Personal information
- Nationality: Irish
- Born: 9 December 1987 (age 38) Dublin, Ireland

Sport
- Sport: Running
- Event: 800 metres
- Club: Newbridge AC

Achievements and titles
- Personal best: 2:00.58

Rose-Anne Galligan (born 9 December 1987) is an Irish athlete. She competes in the 1500 metres and the 800 metres, where she is the Irish national record holder with a time of 2:00.58.

== Career ==
Galligan is a former Irish schools champion. Galligan attended university at the University of Tennessee, where she competed on the athletics team. In the distance medley relay at the 2007 National Collegiate Athletic Association (NCAA) Championships Athletics finals, she was the opening runner on the silver medal-winning team. In January the following year, Galligan finished second in the final of the 1500 metres at the Irish Indoor Athletics Championships, behind Ciara Mageean .

At the 2009 European Athletics Under-23 Championships, Galligan ran a personal best time of 4:14.84 to qualify for the 1500 metres final, where she finished sixth. Just over a week later, she ran a personal best time to win the 800 metres at the BMC Gold Standard Races in Watford. Her time of 2:05.14 was an improvement of more than a second on her previous best. She won the 800 metres at the Irish national championships in early August, and on 29 August, won the 2009 Antwerp Athletics Gala 800 metres ahead of Camilla De Bleecker.

Galligan qualified for the 1500 metres 2010 World Indoor Championships in Athletics held in Doha. She failed to progress further than the heats after finishing eighth. In July 2010, she won the 800 metres at the AAI Senior Track and Field Championships.

She missed most of 2012 due to illness, later revealed to have been low-level blood poisoning caused by her wisdom teeth.

At the London Diamond League Anniversary Games on 27 July 2013, Galligan broke Sonia O'Sullivan's 19-year-old Irish national record in the 800 metres; running a time of 2:00.58, she finished sixth in the race. At the 2013 World Championships in Athletics, Galligan failed to reach the semifinals of the 800 metres, after finishing seventh in her heat.

Galligan competed at the 2014 IAAF World Indoor Championships in Sopot, Poland. Despite running a season's best, she failed to progress past the first round of the 800 metres after finishing last in her heat.

=== 2014-2015 ===
Sponsored by New Balance Running.
