= Mariya Savinova =

Russian middle-distance runner (born 1985)

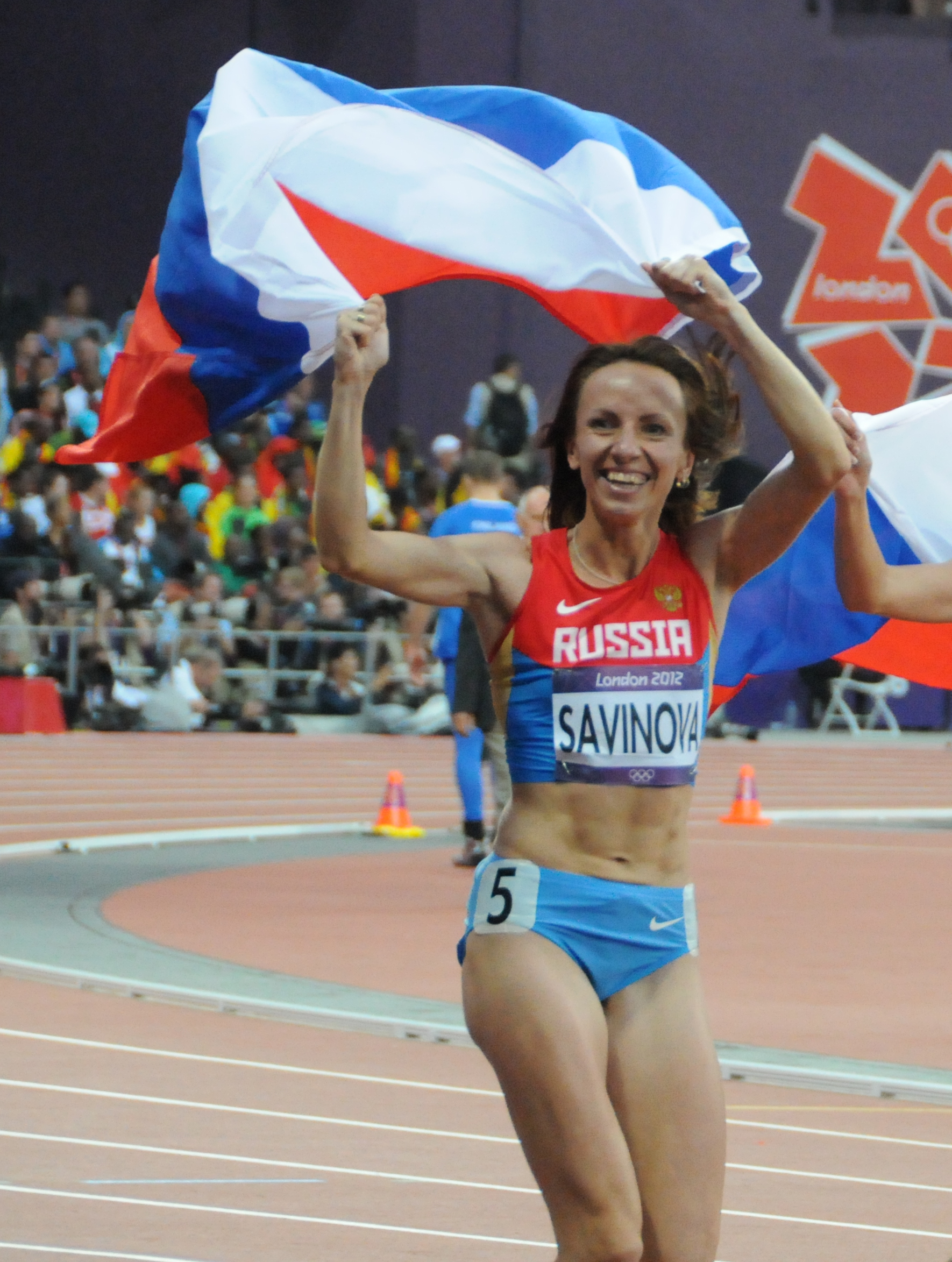
- Savinova in 2012

Personal information
- Nationality: Russia
- Born: 13 August 1985 (age 40) Chelyabinsk, Soviet Union
- Height: 1.72 m (5 ft 8 in)
- Weight: 60 kg (132 lb)

Sport
- Sport: Running
- Event: 800 metres
- Club: Dynamo Sports Club
Medal record
Women's athletics
Representing Russia
Olympic Games
Disqualified	2012 London	800 m
World Championships
Disqualified	2011 Daegu	800 m
Disqualified	2013 Moscow	800 m
European Championships
Disqualified	2010 Barcelona	800 m
World Indoor Championships
Gold medal – first place	2010 Doha	800 m
European Indoor Championships
Gold medal – first place	2009 Turin	800 m

Mariya Sergeyevna Savinova (Russian: Мария Сергеевна Савинова; born 13 August 1985) is a Russian former athlete who specialized in the 800 metres event. In 2017, she was found guilty of doping and was subsequently suspended from competition for four years. In addition to the ban, she had three years of elite results nullified and was stripped of both her World Championship medals (2011 and 2013) and her 2012 Olympic gold medal.

== Career ==
Savinova was born in Chelyabinsk. In 2009, she became the European indoor champion in the 800-metres and the World indoor champion (also in the 800 m) one year later. She originally was awarded gold medals at the 2011 World Championships in Daegu, and the 2012 Olympic Games in London. In 2013, she captured silver in the 800-metres in the World Championships in Moscow.

== Doping suspension ==
In December 2014, in an undercover documentary filmed by a Russian whistleblower which aired on German TV, Savinova admitted to injecting testosterone and using the anabolic steroid oxandrolone. She said, "Oxandrolone is very quickly out of my body again. It takes less than 20 days. We have tested that. My husband has very good contacts at the doping control laboratory." The footage led to Savinova's blood samples being re-examined and launched an investigation by the World Anti-Doping Agency into Russia.

In August 2015, the IAAF charged her with doping violations. The case was referred to the Court of Arbitration for Sport (CAS) in 2017.” Not long after, in November 2015, Savinova was one of five Russian runners the World Anti-Doping Agency (WADA) recommended to receive a lifetime ban for doping during the London Olympics, along with Ekaterina Poistogova.

On 10 February 2017, the Court of Arbitration for Sport issued a 43-page opinion which noted that, “It follows from the information and intelligence provided by Ms. Yuliya Stepanova (Savinova's teammate) that the Athlete [Savinova] used prohibited substances over a long period of time." The CAS upheld the four-year ban for Savinova, disqualified her results from July 2010 to August 2013, and forfeited her of the medals she was awarded during that time, including prize money and appearance fees.

== International competitions ==
Representing Russia
Year	Competition	Venue	Position	Event	Notes
2008	World Indoor Championships	Valencia, Spain	Heats	800 m	2:06.72
2009	European Indoor Championships	Turin, Italy	1st	800 m	1:58.10
2009	World Championships	Berlin, Germany	5th	800 m	1:58.68
2010	World Indoor Championships	Doha, Qatar	1st	800 m	1:58.26
2010	European Championships	Barcelona, Spain	DSQ	800 m	~~1:58.22~~
2010	Continental Cup	Split, Croatia	DSQ	800 m	~~1:58.27~~
2011	World Championships	Daegu, South Korea	DSQ	800 m	~~1:55.87~~
2012	Olympic Games	London, United Kingdom	DSQ	800 m	~~1:56.19~~
2013	World Championships	Moscow, Russia	DSQ	800 m	~~1:57.80~~

== See also ==
- List of doping cases in athletics
- List of Olympic medalists in athletics (women)
- List of stripped Olympic medals
- 800 metres at the Olympics
- 800 metres at the World Championships in Athletics
- Russia at the World Athletics Championships
- Doping at the World Athletics Championships
- List of IAAF World Indoor Championships medalists (women)
- List of stripped European Athletics Championships medals
- List of European Athletics Indoor Championships medalists (women)
- List of Russian sportspeople
- List of people from Chelyabinsk
