= Yevgeniya Zinurova =

Russian runner (born 1982)

Yevgeniya Grigoryevna Zinurova (Russian: Евгения Григорьевна Зинурова; born 16 November 1982) is a Russian runner who specializes in the 800 metres. She was born in Zlatoust in Russia's Chelyabinsk Oblast. She has personal bests of 1:58.04 minutes for the 800 m and 4:10.26 minutes for the 1500 metres.

She won the Russian title over 800m in 2008 and made her international debut two years later at the 2010 IAAF World Indoor Championships, where she was late disqualified for doping. At 2011 European Athletics Indoor Championships she won the 800m, but was later disqualified for doping.
