= Élian Périz =

Spanish middle-distance runner

Élian Périz Toyas (born 1 April 1984) is a Spanish runner who specializes in the 800 metres. Her personal best time is 2:01.72, achieved in July 2015 in Madrid.

She was born in Huesca. She competed at the 2009 European Indoor Championships and the 2010 World Indoor Championships without reaching the final.

== Achievements ==
Year	Competition	Venue	Position	Event	Notes
Representing Spain
2008	Ibero-American Championships	Iquique, Chile	8th	800 m	2:09.22
2009	European Indoor Championships	Turin, Italy	14th (h)	800 m	2:08.10
2010	World Indoor Championships	Doha, Qatar	11th (h)	800 m	2:04.71
2010	Ibero-American Championships	San Fernando, Spain	4th	800 m	2:04.25
2010	European Championships	Barcelona, Spain	23rd (h)	800 m	2:03.55
2011	European Indoor Championships	Paris, France	10th (sf)	800 m	2:03.31
2011	Universiade	Shenzhen, China	6th (sf)	800 m	2:03.82
