= England at the 2010 Commonwealth Games (A) =

- CGF code: ENG
- CGA: Commonwealth Games England
- Website: weareengland.org

in Delhi, India
- Competitors: 364 in 17 sports
- Flag bearers: Opening: Nathan Robertson; Closing: Nicky Hunt
- Medals Ranked 3rd: Gold 37 Silver 60 Bronze 45 Total 142

Commonwealth Games appearances (overview)
- 1930; 1934; 1938; 1950; 1954; 1958; 1962; 1966; 1970; 1974; 1978; 1982; 1986; 1990; 1994; 1998; 2002; 2006; 2010; 2014; 2018; 2022; 2026; 2030

England was represented at the 2010 Commonwealth Games by Commonwealth Games England. The country went by the abbreviation ENG, will use the Cross of St George as its flag and "Jerusalem" as its victory anthem. It had previously used "Land of Hope and Glory" as its anthem at the Commonwealth Games, but decided to change following an "internet poll".

England's delegation is notable for including two Paralympic champions, who qualified to compete in Delhi against fully able-bodied athletes: Danielle Brown, who won a gold medal in archery at the 2008 Summer Paralympics, and Sarah Storey, who won two gold medals in cycling in 2008. They are the first English athletes with disabilities ever to compete in able-bodied events at the Commonwealth Games.

== England 2010 ==
Key
Qualifiers / Medal Winners
Top 8 Finish (Non Medal Winners)
Non-Qualifiers / Non Top 8 Finish

== Aquatics ==
Aquatics Medal Tally

Gold	Silver	Bronze	TOTAL
9	18	11	38

=== Diving ===
Team England consists of 12 divers over 10 events. On 25 September 2010, it was announced that Peter Waterfield was withdrawing from the games.

Diving Medal Tally

Gold	Silver	Bronze	TOTAL
2	0	0	2

Men

Events	Diver(s)	Qualification		Final	
Events	Diver(s)	Points	Rank	Points	Rank
1m Springboard	Nick Robinson-Baker	356.20 pts	9	385.10 pts	6
1m Springboard	Oliver Dingley	380.60 pts	3	352.35 pts	9
3m Springboard	Nick Robinson-Baker	393.70 pts	9	435.50 pts	5
3m Springboard	Jack Laugher	400.30 pts	7	370.20 pts	11
10m Platform	Tom Daley	271.70 pts	1 Q	538.35 pts	Gold
10m Platform	Max Brick	217.50 pts	5 Q	409.35 pts	8
3m Springboard Synchronised	Chris Mears & Nick Robinson-Baker			400.95	4
3m Springboard Synchronised	Oliver Dingley & Jack Laugher			349.20 pts	7
10m Platform Synchronised	Max Brick & Tom Daley			439.65 pts	Gold

Women

Events	Diver(s)	Qualification		Final	
Events	Diver(s)	Points	Rank	Points	Rank
1m Springboard	Rebecca Gallantree	251.25 pts	7 Q	262.30 pts	6
1m Springboard	Alicia Blagg	262.20 pts	5 Q	253.85 pts	8
3m Springboard	Rebecca Gallantree	274.30 pts	6 Q	313.20 pts	5
3m Springboard	Alicia Blagg	259.05 pts	9 Q	243.30 pts	10
10m Platform	Monique Gladding	342.10 pts	4	335.95 pts	6
10m Platform	Tonia Couch	320.25 pts	7	315.20 pts	8
3m Springboard Synchronised	Alicia Blagg & Rebecca Gallantree			293.04 pts	4
10m Platform Synchronised	Sarah Barrow & Tonia Couch			319.68 pts	4
10m Platform Synchronised	Rebecca Gallantree & Stacie Powell			311.94 pts	7

=== Swimming ===
Team England consists of 45 swimmers over 44 events.

Swimming Medal Tally

Gold	Silver	Bronze	TOTAL
7	16	11	34

==== Men ====
Event	Swimmer(s)	Heats		Semi Finals		Final	
Event	Swimmer(s)	Result	Rank	Result	Rank	Result	Rank
50m Freestyle	Simon Burnett	22.68	7 Q	22.66	7 Q	22.44	4
50m Freestyle	Adam Brown	22.79	8 Q	22.75	8 Q	22.51	=6
50m Freestyle	Grant Turner	23.03	11 Q	22.78	9	DNQ	9
100m Freestyle	Simon Burnett	49.97	10 Q	49.40	4 Q	48.54	Silver
100m Freestyle	Adam Brown	49.88	5 Q	49.65	8 Q	49.82	8
100m Freestyle	Grant Turner	49.87	4 Q	49.92	9	DNQ	9
200m Freestyle	Ross Davenport	1:49.38	8 Q			1:48.60	5
200m Freestyle	Robert Bale	1:49.26	7 Q			1:48.73	7
400m Freestyle	Richard Charlesworth	3:53.83	8 Q			3:58.50	8
400m Freestyle	Daniel Coombs	3:54.74	11			DNQ	11
400m Freestyle	Robert Bale	3:55.71	13			DNQ	13
1,500m Freestyle	Daniel Fogg	15:28.80	2 Q			15:13.50	Bronze
1,500m Freestyle	Richard Charlesworth	15:48.01	7 Q			15:42.77	8
50m Backstroke	Liam Tancock	25.47	1 Q	25.62	6 Q	24.62	Gold
100m Backstroke	Liam Tancock	55.15	3 Q	54.32	2 Q	53.59	Gold
100m Backstroke	Chris Walker-Hebborn	55.18	4 Q	54.76	5 Q	55.04	6
100m Backstroke	Ryan Bennett	56.07	10 Q	55.50	8 Q	55.85	7
200m Backstroke	James Goddard	1:59.30	1 Q			1:55.58	Gold
200m Backstroke	Chris Walker-Hebborn	2:00.57	7 Q			1:59.00	4
200m Backstroke	Ryan Bennett	2:00.32	5 Q			2:01.86	8
50m Breaststroke	Daniel Sliwinski	28.47	3 Q	28.53	6 Q	28.12	6
100m Breaststroke	Daniel Sliwinski	1:03.20	13 Q	1:01.60	8 Q	1:01.68	8
100m Breaststroke	Andrew Willis	1:02.87	10 Q	1:01.84	=10	DNQ	=10
100m Breaststroke	Richard Webb	1:02.89	11 Q	1:01.84	=10	DNQ	=10
200m Breaststroke	Andrew Willis	2:13.42	3 Q			2:11.49	4
200m Breaststroke	Richard Webb	2:16.83	11			DNQ	11
50m Butterfly	Antony James	24.37	5 Q	24.40	8 Q	24.29	6
100m Butterfly	Antony James	54.19	5 Q	53.08	4 Q	52.50	= Silver
100m Butterfly	Michael Rock	54.42	7 Q	55.20	12	DNQ	12
200m Butterfly	Michael Rock	1:58.42	8 Q			1:57.15	Silver
200m Butterfly	Joe Roebuck	1:57.98	6 Q			1:57.44	6
200m Butterfly	Roberto Pavoni	1:58.24	7 Q			1:58.13	7
200m Individual Medley	James Goddard	2:00.43	1 Q			1:58.10	Gold
200m Individual Medley	Joe Roebuck	2:01.80	4 Q			1:59.86	Silver
200m Individual Medley	Roberto Pavoni	2:03.37	9			DNQ	9
400m Individual Medley	Joe Roebuck	4:18.56	2 Q			4:15.84	Silver
400m Individual Medley	Roberto Pavoni	4:22.06	6 Q			4:19.81	7
4 × 100 m Freestyle Relay	Adam Brown; Simon Burnett; Ross Davenport; Liam Tancock; Grant Turner	Davenport 49.72; Burnett 49.23; Turner 48.83; Brown 49.81; 3:17.80	2 Q			Burnett 48.82; Tancock 48.14; Turner 49.01; Brown 49.08; 3:15.05	Silver
4 × 200 m Freestyle Relay	Robert Bale; Steven Beckerleg; Ross Davenport; Chris Walker-Hebborn; Daniel Coombs; Richard Charlesworth	Bale 1:50.54; Coombs 1:49.95; Beckerleg 1:51.45; Charlesworth 1:50.67; 7:22.61	2 Q			Bale 1:48.72; Davenport 1:48.44; Coombs 1:49.21; Walker-Hebborn 1:50.20; 7:16.57	5
4 × 100 m Medley Relay	Adam Brown; Simon Burnett; Chris Walker-Hebborn; Antony James; Daniel Sliwinski; Liam Tancock	Walker-Hebborn 55.85; Sliwinski 1:03.05; James 55.43; Brown 50.31; 3:44.64	2 Q			Tancock 53.66; Sliwinski 1:02.27; James 52.34; Burnett 48.04; 3:36.31	Bronze

Men – EAD (Para-Sports)

Event	Swimmer(s)	Heats		Final	
Event	Swimmer(s)	Result	Rank	Result	Rank
50m Freestyle S9	Simon Miller	27.00	2 Q	26.70	Silver
100m Freestyle S10	Robert Welbourn	55.94	3 Q	55.10	Bronze

==== Women ====
Event	Swimmer(s)	Heats		Semi Finals		Final	
Event	Swimmer(s)	Result	Rank	Result	Rank	Result	Rank
50m Freestyle	Francesca Halsall	25.05	1 Q	25.18	3 Q	24.98	Silver
50m Freestyle	Amy Smith	25.67	6 Q	25.49	6 Q	25.74	6
50m Freestyle	Jess Sylvester	26.74	12 Q	26.31	=9	DNQ	=9
100m Freestyle	Francesca Halsall	55.58	5 Q	55.10	3 Q	54.57	Bronze
100m Freestyle	Amy Smith	55.50	4 Q	55.18	5 Q	54.91	5
100m Freestyle	Emma Saunders	56.13	9 Q	55.85	8 Q	56.17	8
200m Freestyle	Rebecca Adlington	1:59.68	6 Q			1:58.47	Bronze
200m Freestyle	Jo Jackson	1:59.33	4 Q			1:58.66	5
200m Freestyle	Emma Saunders	2:01.51	12			DNQ	12
400m Freestyle	Rebecca Adlington	4:10.70	3 Q			4:05.68	Gold
400m Freestyle	Anne Bochmann	4:13.74	8 Q			4:08.30	4
400m Freestyle	Jo Jackson	4:12.32	6 Q			4:10.37	6
800m Freestyle	Rebecca Adlington	8:35.82	2 Q			8:24.69	Gold
800m Freestyle	Sasha Matthews	8:41.10	7 Q			8:45.28	6
800m Freestyle	Aimee Willmott	9:11.09	8			8:49.31	8
50m Backstroke	Gemma Spofforth	28.30	1 Q	28.29	2 Q	28.03	Silver
50m Backstroke	Emma Saunders	29.68	9 Q	29.59	9	DNQ	9
100m Backstroke	Gemma Spofforth	1:01.68	=7 Q	1:01.05	6 Q	1:00.02	Silver
100m Backstroke	Stephanie Proud	1:01.68	=7 Q	1:01.25	9	DNQ	9
100m Backstroke	Elizabeth Simmonds	1:01.05	3 Q	1:01.42	10	DNQ	10
200m Backstroke	Elizabeth Simmonds	2:10.07	4 Q			2:07.90	Silver
200m Backstroke	Gemma Spofforth	2:12.93	8 Q			2:09.08	5
200m Backstroke	Stephanie Proud	2:11.02	5 Q			2:09.12	6
50m Breaststroke	Kate Haywood	31.30	3 Q	31.22	3 Q	31.17	Bronze
50m Breaststroke	Achieng Ajulu-Bushell	31.97	6 Q	31.47	4 Q	31.56	5
100m Breaststroke	Kate Haywood	1:08.37	1 Q	1:08.51	4 Q	1:08.29	Bronze
100m Breaststroke	Stacey Tadd	1:10.69	7 Q	1:10.16	7 Q	1:10.12	7
100m Breaststroke	Achieng Ajulu-Bushell	1:12.12	13 Q	1:10.67	8 Q	1:10.73	8
200m Breaststroke	Stacey Tadd	2:28.75	5 Q			2:28.48	6
200m Breaststroke	Kate Hutchinson	2:34.08	9			DNQ	9
50m Butterfly	Francesca Halsall	26.69	3 Q	26.33	3 Q	26.24	Gold
50m Butterfly	Ellen Gandy	27.07	5 Q	27.14	8 Q	26.80	5
50m Butterfly	Amy Smith	27.25	8 Q	27.23	10	DNQ	10
100m Butterfly	Ellen Gandy	59.63	6 Q	58.24	1 Q	58.06	Silver
100m Butterfly	Jess Sylvester	1:00.31	9 Q	59.33	7 Q	59.40	7
100m Butterfly	Francesca Halsall	1:00.26	8 Q	59.84	10	DNQ	10
200m Butterfly	Ellen Gandy	2:10.35	5 Q			2:07.75	Bronze
200m Butterfly	Jessica Dickons	2:11.43	7 Q			2:11.24	7
200m Butterfly	Anne Bochmann	2:17.29	10			DNQ	10
200m Individual Medley	Aimee Willmott	2:15.95	7 Q			2:15.38	6
200m Individual Medley	Kate Hutchinson	2:15.90	6 Q			2:15.75	8
200m Individual Medley	Anne Bochmann	2:18.07	9			DNQ	9
400m Individual Medley	Keri-Anne Payne	4:43.14	1 Q			4:41.07	Bronze
400m Individual Medley	Aimee Willmott	4:48.39	5 Q			4:44.87	5
400m Individual Medley	Stephanie Proud	4:48.83	6 Q			4:46.17	6
4 × 100 m Freestyle Relay	Francesca Halsall; Emma Saunders; Amy Smith; Jess Sylvester					Smith 55.26; Halsall 53.98; Saunders 55.51; Sylvester 55.28; 3:40.03	Silver
4 × 200 m Freestyle Relay	Rebecca Adlington; Jo Jackson; Sasha Matthews; Emma Saunders					Jackson 1:59.06; Adlington 1:59.68; Saunders 2:00.79; Matthews 1:59.08; 7:58.61	Bronze
4 × 100 m Medley Relay	Ellen Gandy; Francesca Halsall; Kate Haywood; Gemma Spofforth					Spofforth 59.83; Haywood 1:08.43; Gandy 57.41; Halsall 54.42; 4:00.09	Silver

Women – EAD (Para-Sports)

Event	Swimmer(s)	Heats		Final	
Event	Swimmer(s)	Result	Rank	Result	Rank
50m Freestyle S9	Stephanie Millward	30.09	3 Q	29.69	Bronze
100m Freestyle S9	Stephanie Millward	1:06.39	2 Q	1:03.69	Silver
100m Butterfly S9	Stephanie Millward			1:13.11	Silver

=== Synchronised swimming ===
Team England consists of 2 swimmers over 2 events.

Synchronised Swimming Medal Tally

Gold	Silver	Bronze	TOTAL
0	2	0	2

Women

Events	Swimmer(s)	Technical Routine		Free Routine		Total Points	Rank
Events	Swimmer(s)	Points	Rank	Points	Rank	Total Points	Rank
Solo	Jenna Randall	44.583	2	45.417	2	80.000	Silver
Duet	Olivia Allison & Jenna Randall	44.250	2	45.084	2	89.334	Silver

== Archery ==
Team England consists of 12 archers over 8 events

Archery Medal Tally

Gold	Silver	Bronze	TOTAL
4	3	0	7

Men's Compound Individual

Archer(s)	Qualification		Round of 64	Round of 32	Round of 16	Quarter Final	Semi Final	Final	Rank
Archer(s)	Score	Seed	Opposition Result	Opposition Result	Opposition Result	Opposition Result	Opposition Result	Opposition Result	Rank
Duncan Busby	703	2	BYE	(Malaysia) Lang (MAS); W 4–0	(New Zealand) Waddick (NZL); W 4–0	(Australia) Timms (AUS); W 7–3	(New Zealand) Teasdale (NZL); W 6–2	(England) White (ENG); W 6–2	Gold
Chris White	696	12	BYE	(Mauritius) Cornet (MRI); W 4–0	(England) Grimwood (ENG); W 4–0	(Wales) Kalmaru (WAL); W 6–2	(South Africa) Cilliers (RSA); W 6–4	(England) Busby (ENG); L 2–6	Silver
Liam Grimwood	700	5	BYE	(Scotland) Keppie (SCO); W 4–2	(England) White (ENG); L 0–4	-	-	-	=9

Men's Recurve Individual

Archer(s)	Qualification		Round of 64	Round of 32	Round of 16	Quarter Final	Semi Final	Final	Rank
Archer(s)	Score	Seed	Opposition Result	Opposition Result	Opposition Result	Opposition Result	Opposition Result	Opposition Result	Rank
Laurence Godfrey	661	6	BYE	(Scotland) Forrester (SCO); W 4–0	(England) Wills (ENG); W 4–0	(Canada) Lyon (CAN); L 3–7	-	-	7
Simon Terry	660	7	BYE	(Cyprus) El Helali (CYP); W 4–2	(Bangladesh) Milon (BAN); W 4–2	(India) Talukdar (IND); L 2–6	-	-	8
Alan Wills	650	11	BYE	(Canada) MacDonald (CAN); W 4–0	(England) Godfrey (ENG); L 0–4	-	-	-	=9

Women's Compound Individual

Archer(s)	Qualification		Round of 32	Round of 16	Quarter Final	Semi Final	Final	Rank
Archer(s)	Score	Seed	Opposition Result	Opposition Result	Opposition Result	Opposition Result	Opposition Result	Rank
Nicky Hunt	697	2	(Cyprus) Dikomiti (CYP); W 4–0	(India) Kaur (IND); W 4–2	(Malaysia) Mat Salleh (MAS); W 6–2	(Australia) Hyde (AUS); W 6–2	(Canada) Jones (CAN); W 6–4	Gold
Danielle Brown	676	14	(New Zealand) McGregor (NZL); W 4–0	(Scotland) Jennings (SCO); W 4–2	(Australia) Hyde (AUS); L 5–6	-	-	5
Nichola Simpson	689	4	(New Zealand) Mitchell (NZL); L 0–4	-	-	-	-	=17

Women's Recurve Individual

Archer(s)	Qualification		Round of 32	Round of 16	Quarter Final	Semi Final	Final	Rank
Archer(s)	Score	Seed	Opposition Result	Opposition Result	Opposition Result	Opposition Result	Opposition Result	Rank
Alison Williamson	635	6	BYE	(Singapore) Cheok (SIN); W 4–0	(Canada) Vrakking (CAN); W 6–0	(India) Banerjee (IND); W 6–2	(India) Kumari (IND); L 0–6	Silver
Amy Oliver	627	7	BYE	(Canada) MacDougall (CAN); W 4–2	(India) Banerjee (IND); L 2–6	-	-	6
Naomi Folkard	642	3	BYE	(Canada) Vrakking (CAN); L 0–4	-	-	-	=9

Team Events

Archer(s)	Qualification		Round of 16	Quarter Final	Semi Final	Final	Rank
Archer(s)	Score	Seed	Opposition Result	Opposition Result	Opposition Result	Opposition Result	Rank
Men's Compound Team; Liam Grimwood, Chris White & Duncan Busby	2,099	1	BYE	(Northern Ireland) Northern Ireland; W 232–224	(Australia) Australia; W 228–224	(India) India; W 231–229	Gold
Men's Recurve Team; Simon Terry, Laurence Godfrey & Alan Wills	1,971	2	BYE	(Cyprus) Cyprus; W 218–209	(Malaysia) Malaysia; L 213–217	Bronze Final: (India) India; L 218–221	4
Women's Compound Team; Nicky Hunt, Danielle Brown & Nichola Simpson	2,062	2		(New Zealand) New Zealand; W 227–221	(Malaysia) Malaysia; W 227–221	(Canada) Canada; W 232–229	Gold
Women's Recurve Team; Alison Williamson, Amy Oliver & Naomi Folkard	1,904	2		BYE	(Canada) Canada; W 208–200	(India) India; L 206–207	Silver

== Athletics ==
Team England consists of 91 athletes over 48 events

On 21 September 2010 it was announced that 2006 Commonwealth Games champions Christine Ohuruogu (Women's 400m), Lisa Dobriskey (Women's 1,500m) and Phillips Idowu (Men's Triple Jump) were withdrawing from the games. Ohuruogu and Dobriskey cited injury concerns whilst Idowu withdrew due to safety concerns.

Medal Tally

Gold	Silver	Bronze	TOTAL
7	9	10	26

=== Men ===
Track

Event	Athlete(s)	Heats		Round 2		Semi Finals		Final	
Event	Athlete(s)	Result	Rank	Result	Rank	Result	Rank	Result	Rank
100m	Mark Lewis-Francis	10.15	1 Q	10.20	6 Q	10.17	5 Q	10.20	Silver
200m	Leon Baptiste	21.06	3 Q	20.68	3 Q	20.43	1 Q	20.45	Gold
200m	Marlon Devonish	21.15	7 Q	20.90	4 Q	20.70	5 Q	20.75	5
400m	Conrad Williams	45.78	1 Q			45.82	6 Q	45.88	6
400m	Robert Tobin	46.26	6 Q			46.27	10	DNQ	10
400m	Graham Hedman	47.45	22 q			47.02	19	DNQ	19
800m	Darren St Clair	1:50.18	7 Q			1:46.92	4 q	1:52.15	6
800m	Andrew Osagie	1:50.44	8 Q			1:47.52	9	DNQ	9
800m	Niall Brooks	1:50.54	10 Q			1:48.33	11	DNQ	11
1,500m	Andrew Baddeley	3:41.25	4 Q					3:43.33	6
1,500m	Thomas Lancashire	3:40.84	3 Q					3:43.58	8
1,500m	Colin McCourt	3:59.68	23					DNQ	23
5,000m	Chris Thompson							13:39.28	5
5,000m	Lee Emanuel							14:31.38	19
10,000m	Chris Thompson							28:50.47	8
10,000m	Andrew Vernon							29:44.91	10
10,000m	John Beattie							31:01.67	15
110m Hurdles	Andy Turner	13.58	1 Q					13.38	Gold
110m Hurdles	William Sharman	13.66	3 Q					13.50	Silver
110m Hurdles	Lawrence Clarke	13.82	4 Q					13.70	Bronze
400m Hurdles	Richard Yates	49.83	2 Q					49.84	5
400m Hurdles	David Hughes	50.55	8 q					50.48	8
3,000m Steeplechase	Stuart Stokes							8:32.24	5
3,000m Steeplechase	Luke Gunn							8:40.44	7
4 × 100 m Relay	Leon Baptiste; Marlon Devonish; Mark Lewis-Francis; Ryan Scott	Scott; Baptiste; Devonish; Lewis-Francis; 38.67	2 Q					Scott; Baptiste; Devonish; Lewis-Francis; 38.74	Gold
4 × 400 m Relay	Graham Hedman; David Hughes; Nick Leavey; Rob Tobin; Conrad Williams; Rick Yates	Leavey; Hughes; Yates; Hedman; 3:05.34	2 Q					Williams; Leavey; Yates; Tobin; 3:03.97	Bronze

Field – Throws

Event	Athlete(s)	Qualifying		Final	
Event	Athlete(s)	Result	Rank	Result	Rank
Shot Put	Carl Myerscough	18.82	4 q	19.74	4
Shot Put	Scott Rider	18.02	6 q	17.73	8
Discus Throw	Carl Myerscough	60.02	3 Q	60.64	Bronze
Discus Throw	Emeka Udechuku	58.55	5 q	59.59	5
Discus Throw	Chris Scott	56.58	7 q	57.05	7
Hammer Throw	Alex Smith			72.95	Silver
Hammer Throw	Mike Floyd			69.34	Bronze
Hammer Throw	Matthew Lambley			62.95	10

Field – Jumps

Event	Athlete(s)	Qualifying		Final	
Event	Athlete(s)	Result	Rank	Result	Rank
Long Jump	Greg Rutherford	7.74	5 Q	8.22	Silver
Long Jump	Chris Tomlinson	7.95	2 Q	No Mark	12
High Jump	Samson Oni	2.16	1 Q	2.23	4
High Jump	Tom Parsons	2.16	1 Q	2.23	=5
High Jump	Martyn Bernard	2.13	15	DNQ	15
Triple Jump	Nathan Douglas			16.96	4
Triple Jump	Larry Achike			16.59	7
Pole Vault	Steven Lewis			5.60	Silver
Pole Vault	Max Eaves			5.40	Bronze
Pole Vault	Luke Cutts			No Mark	=10

Combined

Event	Athlete(s)	100m	Long Jump	Shot Put	High Jump	400m	110m Hurdles	Discus	Pole Vault	Javelin	1,500m	Final	
Event	Athlete(s)	100m	Long Jump	Shot Put	High Jump	400m	110m Hurdles	Discus	Pole Vault	Javelin	1,500m	Result	Rank
Decathlon	Martin Brockman	11.36; 782pts	7.29; 883pts	13.50; 698pts	2.14; 934pts	49.95; 817pts	15.40; 802pts	37.75; 619pts	4.60; 790pts	51.96; 618pts	4:26.28; 769pts	7,712 pts	Bronze
Decathlon	Ben Hazell	11.37; 780pts	6.98; 809pts	14.30; 747pts	1.93; 740pts	50.26; 803pts	14.92; 859pts	48.01; 829pts	4.40; 731pts	53.41; 639pts	4:30.91; 739pts	7,676 pts	4
Decathlon	Kevin Sempers	11.08; 843pts	6.86; 781pts	12.72; 650pts	2.05; 850pts	49.36; 844pts	14.79; 875pts	39.08; 646pts	4.60; 790pts	61.46; 760pts	5:04.93; 532pts	7,571 pts	5

Road

Event	Athlete(s)	Final	
Event	Athlete(s)	Result	Rank
Marathon	Ben Moreau	2:24:34	11
Marathon	Andi Jones	DNF	-
20 km Walk	Luke Finch	1:29:37	10
20 km Walk	Tom Bosworth	1:30:44	11
20 km Walk	Alex Wright	1:34:26	13

EAD (Para-Sports)

Event	Athlete(s)	Heats		Semi Finals		Final	
Event	Athlete(s)	Result	Rank	Result	Rank	Result	Rank
100m T46	Ola Abidogun	11.37	2 Q	11.32	3 Q	11.50	5
Shot Put F32/34/52	Dan West					10.78 (969 pts)	Silver

=== Women ===
Track

Event	Athlete(s)	Heats		Semi Finals		Final	
Event	Athlete(s)	Result	Rank	Result	Rank	Result	Rank
100m	Katherine Endacott	11.50	6 Q	11.45	6 Q	11.44	Silver
100m	Laura Turner	11.61	9 Q	11.41	4 Q	DQ	-
100m	Montell Douglas	11.74	13 Q	11.62	14	DNQ	14
200m	Abi Oyepitan	23.86	10 Q	23.33	2 Q	23.26	Silver
200m	Joice Maduaka	23.75	5 Q	23.56	4 Q	23.57	4
200m	Laura Turner	23.99	14 Q	DNS	22	DNQ	22
400m	Nadine Okyere	53.75	12 Q	52.89	9	DNQ	9
400m	Kelly Massey	53.90	14 Q	53.24	12	DNQ	12
400m	Vicki Barr	53.86	13 Q	53.51	15	DNQ	15
800m	Emma Jackson	2:01.63	1 Q			2:00.46	4
800m	Hannah England	2:02.63	5 Q			2:00.47	5
1,500m	Hannah England	4:13.91	8 Q			4:06.83	4
1,500m	Helen Clitheroe	4:09.34	2 Q			4:08.89	8
5,000m	Charlotte Purdue					16:16.13	6
10,000m	Charlotte Purdue					33:13.02	4
400m Hurdles	Meghan Beesley	56.95	5 Q			58.36	7
3,000m Steeplechase	Helen Clitheroe					9:56.37	4
3,000m Steeplechase	Tina Brown					10:13.34	7
4 × 100 m Relay	Montell Douglas; Katherine Endacott; Abi Oyepitan; Laura Turner					Endacott; Douglas; Turner; Oyepitan; 44.19	Gold
4 × 400 m Relay	Vicki Barr; Meghan Beesley; Joice Maduaka; Kelly Massey; Nadine Okyere	Massey; Maduaka; Okyere; Barr; 3:36.68	6 Q			Massey; Barr; Beesley; Okyere; 3:29.51	Silver

Field – Throws

Event	Athlete(s)	Qualifying		Final	
Event	Athlete(s)	Result	Rank	Result	Rank
Shot Put	Rebecca Peake			16.28	5
Shot Put	Eleanor Gatrell			15.23	7
Discus Throw	Jade Nicholls			57.62	6
Hammer Throw	Zoe Derham	62.33	3 Q	64.04	Bronze
Hammer Throw	Sarah Holt	57.91	14	DNQ	14
Javelin Throw	Laura Whittingham			58.61	4
Javelin Throw	Izzy Jeffs			46.31	13

Field – Jumps

Event	Athlete(s)	Qualifying		Final	
Event	Athlete(s)	Result	Rank	Result	Rank
High Jump	Vikki Hubbard			1.83	4
High Jump	Kay Humberstone			1.78	=6
High Jump	Stephanie Pywell			1.78	=6
Triple Jump	Nadia Williams			13.66	6
Triple Jump	Yasmin Regis			13.55	8
Pole Vault	Kate Dennison			4.25	Bronze
Pole Vault	Emma Lyons			4.10	7

Combined

Event	Athlete(s)	100m Hurdles	High Jump	Shot Put	200m	Long Jump	Javelin	800m	Final	
Event	Athlete(s)	100m Hurdles	High Jump	Shot Put	200m	Long Jump	Javelin	800m	Result	Rank
Heptathlon	Louise Hazel	13.25; 1087pts	1.69; 842pts	12.54; 697pts	24.10; 971pts	6.44; 988pts	44.42; 752pts	2:20.33; 819pts	6,156pts	Gold
Heptathlon	Grace Clements	14.18; 953pts	1.78; 953pts	12.78; 713pts	25.88; 808pts	6.00; 850pts	43.67; 738pts	2:16.06; 878pts	5,819 pts	Bronze
Heptathlon	Phyllis Agbo	14.20; 950pts	1.63; 771pts	13.16; 738pts	25.46; 845pts	DNS			3,304 pts DNF	9

Road

Event	Athlete(s)	Final	
Event	Athlete(s)	Result	Rank
Marathon	Michelle Cope	2:46:13	6
Marathon	Helen Decker	2:49:24	8
Marathon	Holly Rush	2:49:24	9
20 km Walk	Jo Jackson	1:34:22	Gold
20 km Walk	Lisa Kehler	1:40:33	4

EAD (Para-Sports)

Event	Athlete(s)	Heats		Final	
Event	Athlete(s)	Result	Rank	Result	Rank
100m T37	Katrina Hart			14.36	Gold
100m T37	Bethany Woodward			15.27	6
Shot Put F32-34/52/53	Gemma Prescott			952 pts	Bronze

== See also ==
- England at the Commonwealth Games
- England at the 2006 Commonwealth Games
