= Athletics at the 2010 Commonwealth Games – Women's 4 × 400 metres relay =

Women's 4 × 400 metres relay at the Commonwealth Games

The Women's 4 × 400 metres relay at the 2010 Commonwealth Games as part of the athletics programme was held at the Jawaharlal Nehru Stadium on Monday 11 October and Tuesday 12 October 2010.

On 15 October 2010, three days following the event, Folashade Abugan was reported to have tested positive for Testosterone prohormone, subsequently disqualifying her results including those of the Nigerian women's 4 × 400 metres relay team. The English and Canadian teams' results were elevated to the silver and bronze medal-winning positions respectively.

== Records ==
World Record	3:15.17	Soviet Union	Seoul, South Korea	1 October 1988
Games Record	3:25.63	Australia	Manchester, England	2002

== Round 1 ==
First 3 in each heat (Q) and 2 best performers (q) advance to the Final.

=== Heat 1 ===
Lane	Nation	Competitors	Time	Notes
4	India	Jauna Murmu, Sini Jose, Chitra Soman, Ashwini Akkunji	3:32.52	Q
7	Australia	Pirrenee Steinert, Lauren Boden, Olivia Tauro, Jody Henry	3:33.07	Q
6	Canada	Amonn Nelson, Ruky Abdulai, Vicki Tolton, Carline Muir	3:33.42	Q
8	Nigeria	Bukola Abogunloko, Margaret Etim, Josephine Ehigie, Folashade Abugan	3:35.70	q
3	Kenya	Florence Wasike, Cathrine Musiko, Maureen Maiyo, Grace Kidake	3:39.96	
5	Northern Ireland	Joanna Mills, Christine McMahon, Katie Kirk, Jo Patterson	3:40.92	

=== Heat 2 ===
Lane	Nation	Competitors	Time	Notes
6	Botswana	Lydia Mushila, Kgalalelo Sefo, Oarabile Babolayi, Amantle Montsho	3:36.01	Q
7	England	Kelly Massey, Joice Maduaka, Nadine Okyere, Vicki Barr	3:36.68	Q
5	Scotland	Gemma Nicol, Kathryn Evans, Claire Gibson, Eilidh Child	3:36.93	Q
8	Uganda	Justine Bayigga, Janet Achola, Annet Negesa, Emily Nanziri	3:39.30	q
2	Papua New Guinea	Betty Burua, Salome Dell, Helen Philemon, Toea Wisil	3:40.40	
4	Jamaica	Davita Prendergast, Nadia Cunningham, Tanice Barnett, Dominique Blake	3:42.31	
3	Sierra Leone			DNS

== Final ==
Rank	Lane	Nation	Competitors	Time	Notes
1st place, gold medalist(s)	7	India	Manjeet Kaur, Sini Jose, Ashwini Akkunji, Mandeep Kaur	3:27.77	
2nd place, silver medalist(s)	4	England	Kelly Massey, Vicki Barr, Meghan Beesley, Nadine Okyere	3:29.51	
3rd place, bronze medalist(s)	9	Canada	Amonn Nelson, Adrienne Power, Vicki Tolton, Carline Muir	3:30.20	
4	5	Australia	Jody Henry, Pirrenee Steinert, Olivia Tauro, Sally Pearson	3:30.29	
5	8	Scotland	Gemma Nicol, Eilidh Child, Kathryn Evans, Lee McConnell	3:30.91	
6	6	Botswana	Lydia Mushila, Kgalalelo Sefo, Oarabile Babolayi, Amantle Montsho	3:38.44	
—	3	Uganda	Justine Bayigga, Janet Achola, Annet Negesa, Emily Nanziri	DQ	R 163.3a
—	2	Nigeria	Folashade Abugan, Margaret Etim, Bukola Abogunloko, Muizat Odumosu	DQ (3:28.72)	Doping
