= 2000 World Junior Championships in Athletics – Women's 400 metres =

The women's 400 metres event at the 2000 World Junior Championships in Athletics was held in Santiago, Chile, at Estadio Nacional Julio Martínez Prádanos on 17, 18 and 20 October.

== Medalists ==
Gold	Jana Pittman; Australia
Silver	Aneta Lemiesz; Poland
Bronze	Norma González; Colombia

== Results ==
=== Final ===
20 October

Rank	Name	Nationality	Time	Notes
1st place, gold medalist(s)	Jana Pittman	Australia	52.45	
2nd place, silver medalist(s)	Aneta Lemiesz	Poland	52.78	
3rd place, bronze medalist(s)	Norma González	Colombia	53.30	
4	Maria Rus	Romania	53.46	
5	Natalya Ivanova	Russia	53.58	
6	Natalya Pygyda	Ukraine	53.69	
7	Kareen Gayle	Jamaica	53.95	
8	Martina McCarthy	Ireland	54.32	

=== Semifinals ===
18 October

==== Semifinal 1 ====
Rank	Name	Nationality	Time	Notes
1	Jana Pittman	Australia	53.00	Q
2	Aneta Lemiesz	Poland	53.09	Q
3	Maria Rus	Romania	53.38	Q
4	Martina McCarthy	Ireland	53.61	Q
5	Sheryl Morgan	Jamaica	53.64	
6	Lisa Miller	United Kingdom	53.86	
7	Antonina Yefremova	Ukraine	54.29	
8	Rosibel García	Colombia	56.09	

==== Semifinal 2 ====
Rank	Name	Nationality	Time	Notes
1	Norma González	Colombia	53.42	Q
2	Kareen Gayle	Jamaica	53.69	Q
3	Natalya Ivanova	Russia	53.79	Q
4	Natalya Pygyda	Ukraine	54.02	Q
5	Jenny Meadows	United Kingdom	54.27	
6	Adela Marchis	Romania	54.73	
7	Katerina Dressler	Australia	54.78	
8	Eileen Müller	Germany	55.07	

=== Heats ===
17 October

==== Heat 1 ====
Rank	Name	Nationality	Time	Notes
1	Jana Pittman	Australia	54.01	Q
2	Martina McCarthy	Ireland	54.14	Q
3	Sheryl Morgan	Jamaica	54.38	Q
4	Eileen Müller	Germany	54.72	q
5	Sapinder Kaur	India	56.52	
6	Tiandra Ponteen	Saint Kitts and Nevis	57.09	

==== Heat 2 ====
Rank	Name	Nationality	Time	Notes
1	Norma González	Colombia	53.79	Q
2	Kareen Gayle	Jamaica	53.82	Q
3	Jenny Meadows	United Kingdom	53.85	Q
4	Antonina Yefremova	Ukraine	53.88	q
5	Daniela Reina	Italy	55.12	
6	Silja Ulfarsdóttir	Iceland	55.40	
7	Evodie Lydie Saramandji	Central African Republic	61.21	
	Joanne Cuddihy	Ireland	DQ	

==== Heat 3 ====
Rank	Name	Nationality	Time	Notes
1	Lisa Miller	United Kingdom	53.91	Q
2	Aneta Lemiesz	Poland	54.02	Q
3	Maria Rus	Romania	54.20	Q
4	Katerina Dressler	Australia	54.25	q
5	Hazel-Ann Regis	Grenada	56.33	

==== Heat 4 ====
Rank	Name	Nationality	Time	Notes
1	Natalya Pygyda	Ukraine	54.27	Q
2	Adela Marchis	Romania	54.36	Q
3	Natalya Ivanova	Russia	54.63	Q
4	Rosibel García	Colombia	54.82	q
5	Maren Schulze	Germany	55.49	
6	Tatjana Lojanica	Yugoslavia	56.51	
7	Mereoni Raluve	Fiji	57.73	

== Participation ==
According to an unofficial count, 26 athletes from 18 countries participated in the event.

- Australia (2)
- Central African Republic (1)
- Colombia (2)
- Fiji (1)
- Germany (2)
- Grenada (1)
- Iceland (1)
- India (1)
- Ireland (2)
- Italy (1)
- Jamaica (2)
- Poland (1)
- Romania (2)
- Russia (1)
- Saint Kitts and Nevis (1)
- Ukraine (2)
- United Kingdom (2)
- Yugoslavia (1)
