= 2009 European Athletics Indoor Championships – Women's 4 × 400 metres relay =

Women's 4 × 400 meters relay at the 2009 European Athletics Indoor Championships

The Women's 4 × 400 metres relay event at the 2009 European Athletics Indoor Championships was held on March 8.

== Results ==
Rank	Team	Athlete	Time	Notes
1st place, gold medalist(s)	Russia	Natalya Antyukh; Darya Safonova; Yelena Voynova; Antonina Krivoshapka	3:29.12	
2nd place, silver medalist(s)	Great Britain	Donna Fraser; Kim Wall; Vicki Barr; Marilyn Okoro	3:30.42	
3rd place, bronze medalist(s)	Belarus	Alena Kievich; Katsiaryna Bobryk; Hanna Tashpulatava; Katsiaryna Mishyna	3:35.03	
4	Ireland	Marian Andrews; Brona Furlong; Gemma Hynes; Claire Bergin	3:36.82	
5	Turkey	Pınar Saka; Özge Gürler; Yeliz Kurt; Meliz Redif	3:37.37	NR
6	Lithuania	Edita Kavaliauskienė; Jekaterina Šakovič; Živilė Brokoriūtė; Agnė Orlauskaitė	3:43.42	NR
