= Richard Charlesworth =

Richard Charlesworth may refer to:

- Ric Charlesworth (born 1952), Australian cricketer and field hockey player and coach
- Richard Charlesworth (swimmer) (born 1988), English swimmer
