= Daniela Reina =

Italian sprinter

Personal information
- Nationality: Italian
- Born: 15 May 1981 (age 45) Camerino, Italy
- Height: 1.63 m (5 ft 4 in)
- Weight: 44 kg (97 lb)

Sport
- Country: Italy
- Sport: Athletics
- Event(s): 400 metres 800 metres
- Club: G.S. Fiamme Azzurre
- Coached by: Sergio Biagetti

Achievements and titles
- Personal bests: 200 m: 23.52 (1998); 400 m: 51.18 (2006); 800 m: 2:01.09 (2010)
Medal record
European Indoor Championships
Bronze medal – third place	2002 Vienna	4x400 m relay
Mediterranean Games
Silver medal – second place	2001 Tunis	4x400 m relay
Silver medal – second place	2009 Pescara	400 m
European Cup
Bronze medal – third place	2002 Annecy	4x400 m relay

Daniela Reina (born 15 May 1981 in Camerino) is an Italian former sprinter (200 m and 400 m) and middle-distance runner (800 m).

In her career she won 8 times the national championships. She has 25 caps in the Italy national athletics team.

== National records ==
- 400 metres: 51.18 (Rieti, 17 August 2006) - record holder until 2 July 2009

== International competitions ==
Year	Competition	Venue	Position	Event	Notes
Representing Italy
2000	World Junior Championships	Santiago, Chile	17th (h)	400m	55.12
2001	European U23 Championships	Amsterdam, Netherlands	7th	400m	54.31
2001	Mediterranean Games	Tunis, Tunisia	2nd	4x400 metres relay	3'38"90
2002	European Indoor Championships	Vienna, Austria	3rd	4x400 metres relay	3'36"49
2003	European U23 Championships	Bydgoszcz, Poland	13th (h)	400m	54.82
2006	European Championships	Gothenburg, Sweden	Semifinal	400 metres	52.12
2007	European Indoor Championships	Birmingham, United Kingdom	Semifinal	400 metres	53.00
2007	World Championships	Osaka, Japan	Semifinal	400 metres	51.99
2009	European Indoor Championships	Turin, Italy	5th	400 metres	53.11
2009	Mediterranean Games	Pescara, Italy	2nd	400 metres	52.34
2010	European Championships	Barcelona, Spain	Heat	800 metres	2:01.94

== National titles ==
Daniela Reina has won 8 times the individual national championship.

- 4 wins in the 400 metres (2005, 2006, 2007, 2008)
- 4 wins in the 400 metres indoor (2006, 2007, 2008, 2009)

== See also ==
- Italian all-time top lists - 400 metres
- Italian all-time top lists - 800 metres
