= Darya Safonova =

Russian sprinter

Medal record

Representing Russia

Women's athletics

European Indoor Championships
Gold medal – first place	2009 Torino	4 × 400 m relay
Bronze medal – third place	2009 Torino	400 m

Darya Safonova (born 20 March 1981) is a Russian sprinter who specializes in the 400 metres.

== Career ==
In 2005, she was found guilty of pemoline doping. She was suspended from the sport between March 2005 to March 2007.

She won the bronze medal at the 2009 European Indoor Championships. At the same championships she won a gold medal in the 4 × 400 metres relay, together with teammates Natalya Antyukh, Yelena Voynova and Antonina Krivoshapka.

Her personal best time is 51.32 seconds, achieved in July 2009 in Cheboksary.
