= 2001 European Athletics U23 Championships – Women's 400 metres =

The women's 400 metres event at the 2001 European Athletics U23 Championships was held in Amsterdam, Netherlands, at Olympisch Stadion on 12 and 13 July.

== Medalists ==
Gold	Antonina Yefremova; Ukraine
Silver	Helen Thieme; United Kingdom
Bronze	Aneta Lemiesz; Poland

== Results ==
=== Final ===
13 July

Rank	Name	Nationality	Time	Notes
1st place, gold medalist(s)	Antonina Yefremova	Ukraine	52.29	
2nd place, silver medalist(s)	Helen Thieme	United Kingdom	52.75	
3rd place, bronze medalist(s)	Aneta Lemiesz	Poland	53.25	
4	Natalya Zhuravlyova	Ukraine	53.26	
5	Karen Gear	United Kingdom	53.91	
6	Jennifer Meadows	United Kingdom	54.05	
7	Daniela Reina	Italy	54.31	
	Natalya Lavshuk	Russia	DNF	

=== Heats ===
12 July
Qualified: first 3 in each heat and 2 best to the Final

==== Heat 1 ====
Rank	Name	Nationality	Time	Notes
1	Aneta Lemiesz	Poland	52.77	Q
2	Natalya Lavshuk	Russia	53.03	Q
3	Karen Gear	United Kingdom	53.31	Q
4	Jennifer Meadows	United Kingdom	53.32	q
5	Daniela Reina	Italy	53.76	q
6	Silja Úlfarsdóttir	Iceland	54.92	
7	Daisy Carballo	Spain	55.53	
8	Oleksandra Ryzhkova	Ukraine	56.04	

==== Heat 2 ====
Rank	Name	Nationality	Time	Notes
1	Antonina Yefremova	Ukraine	52.43	Q
2	Helen Thieme	United Kingdom	52.88	Q
3	Natalya Zhuravlyova	Ukraine	53.47	Q
4	Martina McCarthy	Ireland	53.96	
5	Beatrice Dahlgren	Sweden	54.01	
6	Martina Naef	Switzerland	55.17	
7	Audrey Rouyer	France	55.23	

== Participation ==
According to an unofficial count, 15 athletes from 11 countries participated in the event.

- France (1)
- Iceland (1)
- Ireland (1)
- Italy (1)
- Poland (1)
- Russia (1)
- Spain (1)
- Sweden (1)
- Switzerland (1)
- Ukraine (3)
- United Kingdom (3)
