= Athletics at the 2010 Commonwealth Games – Women's 400 metres =

Athletics event

Women's 400 metres at the Commonwealth Games

The Women's 400 metres at the 2010 Commonwealth Games as part of the athletics programme was held at the Jawaharlal Nehru Stadium on Wednesday 6 October till Friday 8 October 2010.

The top four runners in each of the initial five heats plus the next four fastest runners from across the heats also qualified for the semifinals. There were three semifinals, and only the top two from each heat advanced to the final and the two fastest runners.

== Records ==
World Record	47.60	Marita Koch	GDR	Canberra, Australia	6 October 1985
Games Record	50.17	Sandie Richards	JAM	Kuala Lumpur, Malaysia	1998

== Heats ==
First 4 in each heat (Q) and 4 best performers (q) advance to the Semifinals.

=== Heat 1 ===
Rank	Lane	Name	Reaction Time	Result	Notes
1	5	Christine Amertil (BAH)	0.223	52.08	Q
2	2	Carline Muir (CAN)	0.216	52.21	Q
3	7	Mandeep Kaur (IND)	0.339	52.48	Q
4	6	Kelly Massey (ENG)	0.216	53.90	Q
5	4	Cathrine Musiko (KEN)	0.240	55.75	
6	3	Mahriam Kamara (SLE)	0.311	1:03.11	

=== Heat 2 ===
Rank	Lane	Name	Reaction Time	Result	Notes
1	7	Amantle Montsho (BOT)	0.264	51.56	Q
2	3	Aliann Pompey (GUY)	0.324	52.33	Q
3	6	Racheal Nachula (ZAM)	0.220	52.89	Q, SB
4	4	Davita Prendergast (JAM)	0.310	54.58	Q
5	5	Grace Kidake (KEN)		54.74	q
6	8	Justine Bayigga (UGA)	0.211	56.11	

=== Heat 3 ===
Rank	Lane	Name	Reaction Time	Result	Notes
1	5	Folashade Abugan (NGR)	0.273	52.41	Q
2	4	Kgalalelo Sefo (BOT)	0.240	54.12	Q
3	7	Dominique Blake (JAM)	0.248	54.29	Q
4	3	Trish Bartholomew (GRN)	0.174	54.73	Q
5	6	Elisa Cossa (MOZ)	0.260	55.62	q
6	2	Jo Patterson (NIR)	0.200	55.72	
7	8	Marie Lascar (MRI)	0.283	56.38	

=== Heat 4 ===
Rank	Lane	Name	Reaction Time	Result	Notes
1	3	Manjeet Kaur (IND)	0.269	52.75	Q
2	7	Margaret Etim (NGR)	0.213	52.81	Q
3	2	Chandrika Rasnayake (SRI)	0.213	53.01	Q, SB
4	6	Vicki Barr (ENG)	0.168	53.86	Q
5	5	Betty Burua (PNG)	0.307	54.90	q, NR
6	4	Emilly Naziri (UGA)	0.234	55.21	q
7	8	Katie Kirk (NIR)	0.326	55.68	

=== Heat 5 ===
Rank	Lane	Name	Reaction Time	Result	Notes
1	8	Lee McConnell (SCO)	0.289	53.24	Q
2	4	Nadine Okyere (ENG)	0.302	53.75	Q
3	2	Amonn Nelson (CAN)	0.187	54.26	Q
4	3	Joanna Mills (NIR)	0.197	55.46	Q
5	5	Dee-Ann Rogers (AIA)	0.194	59.16	
6	7	Mirufath Ahmed (MDV)	0.279	1:00.33	NR
-	8	Nadia Cunningham (JAM)			DNS

== Semifinals ==
First 2 in each heat (Q) and 2 best performers (q) advance to the Final.

=== Semifinal 1 ===
Rank	Lane	Name	Reaction Time	Result	Notes
1	4	Amantle Montsho (BOT)	0.230	50.80	Q
2	5	Aliann Pompey (GUY)	0.230	51.70	Q, SB
3	7	Nadine Okyere (ENG)	0.303	52.89	PB
4	8	Chandrika Rasnayake (SRI)	0.278	52.97	SB
5	6	Racheal Nachula (ZAM)	0.207	53.44	
6	2	Trish Bartholomew (GRN)	0.182	54.15	
7	9	Davita Prendergast (JAM)	0.296	55.09	
8	3	Elisa Cossa (MOZ)	0.211	55.71	

=== Semifinal 2 ===
Rank	Lane	Name	Reaction Time	Result	Notes
1	6	Christine Amertil (BAH)	0.208	51.94	Q
2	5	Lee McConnell (SCO)	0.263	52.27	Q
3	7	Margaret Etim (NGR)	0.223	52.55	q
4	4	Mandeep Kaur (IND)	0.331	52.60	q
5	8	Kelly Massey (ENG)	0.208	53.24	
6	9	Amonn Nelson (CAN)	0.269	53.33	
7	2	Emilly Naziri (UGA)	0.197	54.94	
8	3	Joanna Mills (NIR)	0.170	55.68	

=== Semifinal 3 ===
Rank	Lane	Name	Reaction Time	Result	Notes
1	6	Folashade Abugan (NGR)	0.262	51.78	Q
2	7	Carline Muir (CAN)	0.219	52.55	Q
3	4	Manjeet Kaur (IND)	0.306	53.04	
4	8	Vicki Barr (ENG)	0.183	53.51	
5	5	Kgalalelo Sefo (BOT)	0.246	54.21	
6	9	Dominique Blake (JAM)	0.241	54.34	
7	2	Betty Burua (PNG)	0.266	54.48	NR
8	3	Grace Kidake (KEN)	0.518	55.15	

== Final ==
Rank	Lane	Name	Reaction Time	Result	Notes
1st place, gold medalist(s)	6	Amantle Montsho (BOT)	0.247	50.10	GR
2nd place, silver medalist(s)	5	Aliann Pompey (GUY)	0.357	51.65	SB
3rd place, bronze medalist(s)	4	Christine Amertil (BAH)	0.222	51.96	
4	9	Lee McConnell (SCO)	0.346	52.36	
5	3	Mandeep Kaur (IND)	0.335	52.37	
6	8	Carline Muir (CAN)	0.301	52.43	
7	2	Margaret Etim (NGR)	0.261	52.66	
DSQ	7	Folashade Abugan (NGR)	0.253	51.39	SB
