= 2009 European Athletics Indoor Championships – Women's 400 metres =

The Women's 400 metres event at the 2009 European Athletics Indoor Championships was held on March 6–7.

== Medalists ==
Gold	Silver	Bronze
Antonina Krivoshapka; Russia	Nataliya Pyhyda; Ukraine	Darya Safonova; Russia

== Results ==
=== Heats ===
First 2 of each heat (Q) and the next 4 fastest (q) qualified for the semifinals.

Rank	Heat	Name	Nationality	Time	Notes
1	3	Antonina Krivoshapka	Russia	51.56	Q
2	4	Nataliya Pyhyda	Ukraine	52.64	Q
3	2	Darya Safonova	Russia	52.67	Q
4	1	Natalya Antyukh	Russia	52.75	Q
5	2	Donna Fraser	Great Britain	53.06	Q
6	1	Daniela Reina	Italy	53.27	Q
7	3	Maris Mägi	Estonia	53.50	Q
8	3	Thélia Sigère	France	53.57	q
9	2	Symphora Behi	France	53.81	q
10	4	Brona Furlong	Ireland	53.84	Q, PB
11	4	Sara Petersen	Denmark	53.85	q, NR
12	1	Marian Andrews	Ireland	53.94	q
13	4	Pinar Saka	Turkey	54.00	
14	1	Patrícia Lopes	Portugal	54.04	
15	3	Natalia Romero	Spain	54.36	PB
16	2	Irene Høvik Helgesen	Norway	54.73	
17	4	Tsvetelina Kirilova	Bulgaria	54.78	
18	1	Özge Gürler	Turkey	55.48	SB
19	3	Redif Meliz	Cyprus	55.65	PB
20	2	Klodiana Shala	Albania	55.70	

=== Semifinals ===
First 3 of each semifinals qualified directly (Q) for the final.

Rank	Heat	Name	Nationality	Time	Notes
1	2	Antonina Krivoshapka	Russia	51.59	Q
2	1	Nataliya Pyhyda	Ukraine	52.63	Q
3	1	Darya Safonova	Russia	52.86	Q
4	2	Natalya Antyukh	Russia	52.90	Q
5	1	Daniela Reina	Italy	53.21	Q
6	1	Maris Mägi	Estonia	53.43	SB
7	1	Thélia Sigère	France	53.48	
8	2	Donna Fraser	Great Britain	53.59	Q
9	2	Marian Andrews	Ireland	53.92	PB
10	2	Brona Furlong	Ireland	53.96	
11	1	Sara Petersen	Denmark	54.63	
12	2	Symphora Behi	France	54.81	

=== Final ===
Rank	Name	Nationality	Time	Notes
1st place, gold medalist(s)	Antonina Krivoshapka	Russia	51.18	
2nd place, silver medalist(s)	Nataliya Pyhyda	Ukraine	51.44	PB
3rd place, bronze medalist(s)	Darya Safonova	Russia	51.85	PB
4	Natalya Antyukh	Russia	52.37	SB
5	Daniela Reina	Italy	53.11	SB
6	Donna Fraser	Great Britain	53.58	
