= Esther Akinsulie =

Canadian sprinter

Personal information
- Born: 22 April 1984 (age 42) Winnipeg, Canada
- Education: Carleton University
- Height: 177 cm (5 ft 10 in)

Sport
- Sport: Track and field
Medal record
Representing Canada
Universiade
Gold medal – first place	2009 Belgrade	4 × 400 m relay
Silver medal – second place	2009 Belgrade	400 m
Francophonie Games
Silver medal – second place	2005 Niamey	4 × 400 m relay
Gold medal – first place	2009 Lebanon	4 × 100 m relay
Silver medal – second place	2009 Lebanon	4 x 400 m relay
Bronze medal – third place	2009 Lebanon	200 m

Esther Akinsulie (born 22 April 1984 in Winnipeg, Manitoba) is a Canadian athlete specializing in the 400-metre sprint. She graduated from Carleton University with a degree in psychology.

== Biography ==
Esther Akinsulie began competing in track in her final year at A.Y. Jackson Secondary School, prior to which her focus had been basketball. During her first year at Carleton University she realized she couldn't continue competitively in both sports and chose track as she felt she would have a longer career as a runner.

Esther Akinsulie won two medals at the 2009 Universiade held in Belgrade: the silver in the 400-metre sprint, with 51.70 seconds, and gold in the 4 × 400-metre relay alongside Carline Muir, Amonn Nelson and Kimberly Hyacinthe.

At the 2009 Francophonie Games in Lebanon, Akinsulie won bronze in the 200-metre sprint, silver in the 4 × 400-metre relay alongside Tasha Monroe, Lauren Seibel and Melina Thibodeau, and gold in the 4 × 100-metre relay alongside Hyacinthe, Jennifer Cotten and Kate Ruediger.

Her 2010 season was tarnished by an Achilles tendon injury. She returned to competition in 2011 at the Canadian Track and Field Championships, winning silver in the 400-metre sprint and bronze in the 200-metre sprint.

She competed in the 2009 and 2011 World Championships at the 4 × 400-metre event, but the Canadian relay was eliminated each time in the playoffs.

In February 2013 Akinsulie had a positive anti-doping test on a diuretic and was suspended for six months. She satisfied officials that the substance was not for performance-enhancing reasons.

== Awards ==
International competition
Date	Competition	Location	Result	Event	Performance
2005	Jeux de la Francophonie	Niamey	Silver medal – second place	4 × 400 m	3 min 40 s 96
2007	Pan American Games	Rio de Janeiro	6th	4 × 400 m	3 min 32 s 37
2009	Universiade	Belgrade	Silver medal – second place	400 m	51 s 70
2009	Universiade	Belgrade	Gold medal – first place	4 × 400 m	3 min 33 s 09
2009	Jeux de la Francophonie	Beyrouth	Bronze medal – third place	200 m	23 s 63
2009	Jeux de la Francophonie	Beyrouth	Gold medal – first place	4 × 400 m	3 min 35 s 95

=== Records ===
Personal records
Event	Performance	Location	Date
200 metres	23 s 24	Baton Rouge	17 April 2010
400 metres	51 s 70	Belgrade	9 July 2009
