= Özge Akın =

Turkish sprinter (born 1985)

Personal information
- Nationality: Turkish
- Born: Özge Gürler; June 17, 1985 (age 41) Akhisar, Manisa Province, Turkey

Sport
- Country: Turkey
- Sport: Athletics sprint
- Event(s): 400 m, 400 m hurdles
- Club: Enkaspor, Istanbul
- Coached by: Taner Akın
Medal record
Women's athletics
Representing Turkey
Islamic Solidarity Games
Silver medal – second place	2013 Palembang	4 × 400 m relay
Bronze medal – third place	2013 Palembang	400 m hurdles
Mediterranean Games
Bronze medal – third place	2005 Almería	4 × 400 m relay

Özge Akın (née Gürler, born June 17, 1985) is a Turkish sprinter competing in the 400 m events. She is the current Turkish record holder of the 400 m hurdles events. Following her marriage to her coach, her surname changed to Akın, although she was also subsequently known by the surname Akın-Gürler.

== Career ==
Competing initially in the long jump and running sprint and middle distance, she specialized in 400 m and 400 m hurdles following her coach's recommendation. Özge Gürler was a member of İzmir Gençlik sports club, Anadolu University, Ankara MTA and İzmir Metropolitan Municipality sports club before she transferred to Enkaspor in Istanbul. She studied Physical Education and Sports at the Ege University in İzmir.

Özge Gürler participated at the 2005 Mediterranean Games in Almería, Spain in the 4 × 100 m relay, 400 m hurdles and 4 × 400 m relay events. She ran bronze medal with her teammates Birsen Bekgöz, Pınar Saka and Binnaz Uslu in 4 × 400 m relay.

She was admitted to the Turkey's national athletic team at the 2008 Beijing Olympics for the 400 m hurdles despite an injury at her foot. However, since her injury could not be cured out completely, she did not show at the competition's final run.

Özge Akın qualified for participation in the 4 × 400 m relay event at the 2012 Summer Olympics. She won a silver medal in the 4 × 400 m relay event with her teammates Birsen Engin, Esma Aydemir and Sema Apak as well as a bronze medal in the 400 m hurdles event at the 2013 Islamic Solidarity Games held in Palembang, Indonesia.

== Achievements ==
Year	Competition	Venue	Position	Event	Notes
Representing Turkey
2004	World Junior Championships	Grosseto, Italy	12th (sf)	400 m	55.50
2004	World Junior Championships	Grosseto, Italy	—	4 × 400 m relay	DQ
2005	European U23 Championships	Erfurt, Germany	7th	400 m hurdles	58.69
2005	23rd Universiade	İzmir, Turkey	7th heat	400 m hurdles	59.63
2005	15th Mediterranean Games	Almeria, Spain	3rd	4 × 400 m relay	3:40.75
2006	19th European Championships	Gothenburg, Sweden	30th	400 m hurdles	58.39
2006	European Cup 1st League	Thessaloniki, Greece	6th	400 m hurdles	58.57
2007	European U23 Championships	Debrecen, Hungary	9th (h)	400 m hurdles	58.18
2007	11th World Championships	Osaka, Japan	31st	400 m hurdles	57.40
2009	30th European Indoor Championships	Turin, Italy	18th	400 m	55.48
2009	30th European Indoor Championships	Turin, Italy	5th	4 × 400 m relay	3:37.37 NR
2010	20th European Championships	Barcelona, Spain	31st	400 m hurdles	58.98
2010	20th European Championships	Barcelona, Spain	11th	4 × 400 m relay	3:33.13 NR
2012	21st European Championships	Helsinki, Finland	25th	400 m hurdles	58.90
2013	European Team Championships Super League	Gateshead, Great Britain	9th	4 × 400 m relay	3:36.89
2013	Mediterranean Games	Mersin, Turkey	6th	400 m hurdles	58.13
2013	Summer Universiade	Mersin, Turkey	17th heat	400 m hurdles	1:01.67
2013	Summer Universiade	Mersin, Turkey	4th	4 × 400 m relay	3:40.68
2013	3rd Islamic Solidarity Games	Palembang, Indonesia	2nd	4 × 400 relay	3:53.26
2013	3rd Islamic Solidarity Games	Palembang, Indonesia	3rd	400 m hurdles	59.44
