= British swimming champions – 5000 metres freestyle winners =

British swimming event

The British swimming champions over 5000 metres freestyle, are listed below.

The event was short-lived, ending after 2007 and is currently discontinued.

== 5,000 metres freestyle champions ==
Year	Men's champion	Women's champion
2003	Alan Bircher	Paula Wood
2006	John Owen	Izzi Newman
2007	Richard Charlesworth	Jemma Heyes

== See also ==
- Aquatics GB
- List of British Swimming champions
