= 2001 European Athletics U23 Championships – Women's 4 × 400 metres relay =

The women's 4 x 400 metres relay event at the 2001 European Athletics U23 Championships was held in Amsterdam, Netherlands, at Olympisch Stadion on 15 July.

== Medalists ==
| Gold | Karen Gear; Jennifer Meadows; Tracey Duncan; Helen Thieme; United Kingdom |
| Silver | Aleksandra Pielużek; Aneta Lemiesz; Monika Bejnar; Justyna Karolkiewicz; Poland |
| Bronze | Natalya Zhuravlyova; Natalya Sidorenko; Yuliya Gurtovenko; Antonina Yefremova; Ukraine |

== Results ==
=== Final ===
15 July

| Rank | Nation | Competitors | Time | Notes |
|---|---|---|---|---|
| 1st place, gold medalist(s) | United Kingdom | Karen Gear; Jennifer Meadows; Tracey Duncan; Helen Thieme | 3:31.74 | |
| 2nd place, silver medalist(s) | Poland | Aleksandra Pielużek; Aneta Lemiesz; Monika Bejnar; Justyna Karolkiewicz | 3:32.38 | |
| 3rd place, bronze medalist(s) | Ukraine | Natalya Zhuravlyova; Natalya Sidorenko; Yuliya Gurtovenko; Antonina Yefremova | 3:34.16 | |
| 4 | Russia | Yuliya Tabakova; Olga Mikayeva; Tatyana Rodionova; Mariya Lisnichenko | 3:35.08 | |
| 5 | France | Olivia Abderrhamane; Audrey Rouyer; Elodie Cruchant; Sylvanie Morandais | 3:37.01 | |
| 6 | Netherlands | Judith Vis; Marjolein de Jong; Lotte Visschers; José van der Veen | 3:37.33 | |

== Participation ==
According to an unofficial count, 24 athletes from 6 countries participated in the event.

- France (4)
- Netherlands (4)
- Poland (4)
- Russia (4)
- Ukraine (4)
- United Kingdom (4)
