= Athletics at the 1998 World Youth Games =

Athletics at the World Youth Games
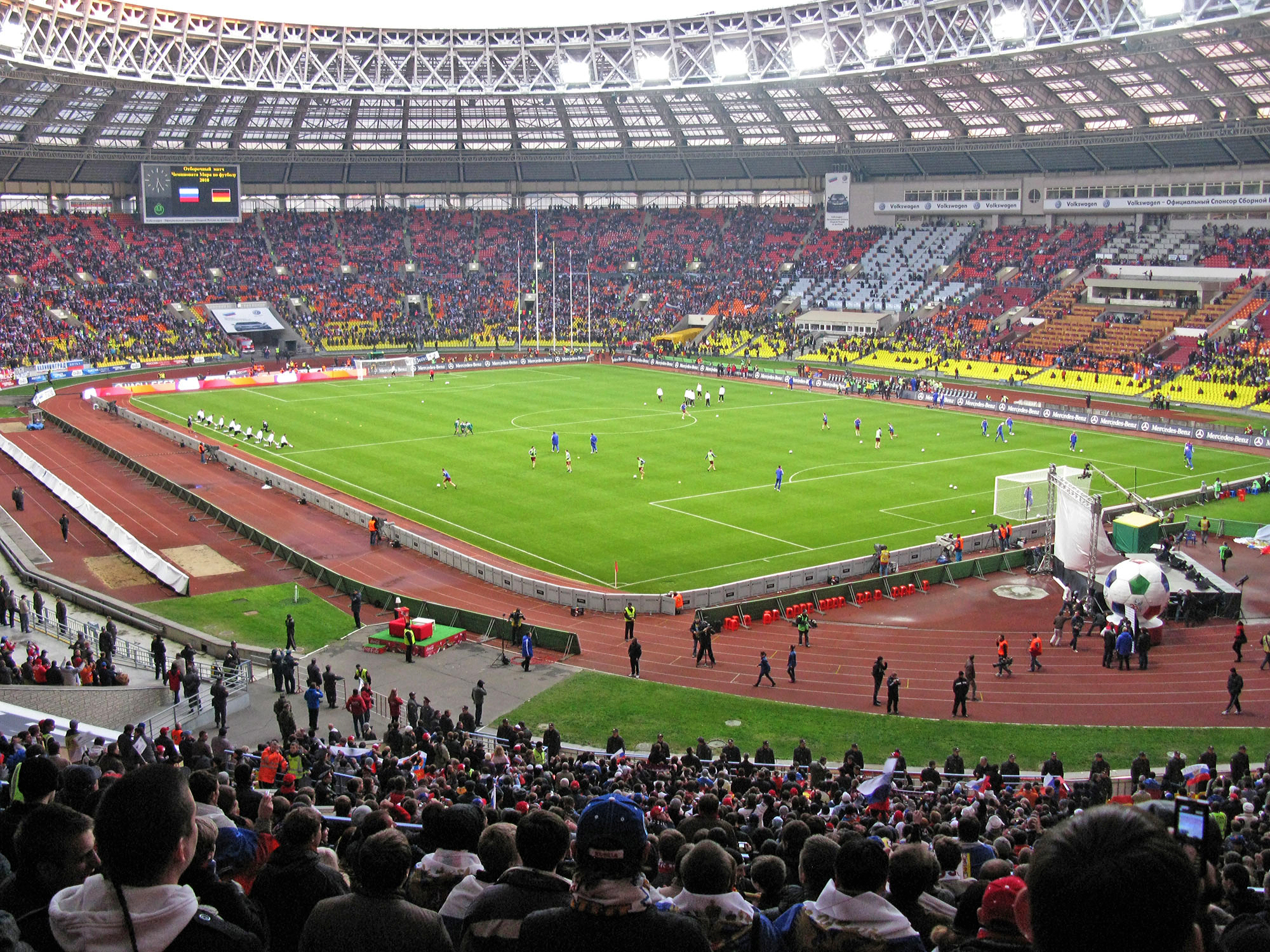
- The host stadium in Moscow (shown in 2009)
- Dates: 14 – 17 July
- Host city: Moscow, Russia
- Venue: Luzhniki Stadium
- Events: 36
- Participation: 678 athletes from 87 nations

At the 1998 World Youth Games the athletics competition was held from 14–17 July at Luzhniki Stadium in Moscow, Russia. A total of 678 youth (under-18) athletes from 87 countries took part in the track and field events.

Several major countries with strong traditions in athletics were absent from the contests (among them Australia, Britain, Canada, France, Germany and the United States) and this undermined the overall quality of performances. Planned subsequent editions were not held. Although the games were not an initial success, the idea was revived in 2010 and athletics events were again held as part of the 2010 Summer Youth Olympics, which garnered wide participation.

== Medal summary ==
=== Boys ===
Event	Gold		Silver		Bronze	
100 metres	Paul Gorries (RSA)	10.76	Kostyantyn Vasyukov (UKR)	10.79	Mirko Turri (ITA)	10.83
200 metres	Wang Hongzhen (CHN)	21.33	Paul Gorries (RSA)	21.40	Vladimir Demchenko (UKR)	21.60
400 metres	Xu Zizhou (CHN)	47.50	Mandla Nkosi (RSA)	48.36	Muhamad Z.Z. Abidin (MAS)	48.72
800 metres	Yuriy Borzakovskiy (RUS)	1:47.71	Mohamed Osman (KSA)	1:49.88	Mandla Nkosi (RSA)	1:50.30
1500 metres	Berkhani Tadesse (ETH)	3:53.96	Yuriy Borzakovskiy (RUS)	3:54.84	Kenneth Ruto (KEN)	3:56.13
3000 metres	Morteza Firuozi (IRI)	8:30.06	Adellu Hussen (ETH)	8:30.69	Ion Luchianov (MDA)	8:32.10
110 metres hurdles	Shen Zhensheng (CHN)	13.74	Camilo Aguirre (CHI)	14.15	Stefanos Ioannou (CYP)	14.17
400 metres hurdles	Hani Al-Mourhej (SYR)	51.39	Luca Bortolaso (ITA)	51.70	Ryan Albert Smith (BAR)	53.26
5000 metres walk	Aleksandr Kuzmin (BLR)	20:40.58	Viktor Burayev (RUS)	20:41.08	Yevgeniy Demkov (RUS)	20:41.25
4 × 100 m relay	Finland (FIN); Ville Vakkuri; Sauli Pahlman; Juha Karhe; Aleksi Sillanpää	41.87	Ukraine (UKR); Yevgeniy Shapiro; Vladimir Demchenko; Sergey Mishchenko; Kostyantyn Vasyukov	42.07	Malaysia (MAS); Mohd. Hafeez Abdul Razak; Nazmizan Mohamad; Boniface Lejau Jozef; Muhamad Z.Z. Abidin	42.19
4 × 400 m relay	China (CHN); Cao Wen; Wang Hongzhen; Peng Tao; Xu Zizhou	3:13.57	South Africa (RSA); Mandla Nkosi; Elton Masia; Tshepo Thobelangope; Paul Gorries	3:15.13	Chinese Taipei (TPE); Ou Tsung-Han; Sung Chih-Chiang; Cheng Shao-Pai; Liu Yuan-Kai	3:20.83
High jump	Aleksey Klimov (BLR)	2.12 m	Fabrizio Schembri (ITA)	2.12 m	Jeong Su-Kwang (KOR)	2.12 m
Pole vault	Fílippos Sgoúros (GRE)	5.05 m	Oleksandr Korchmid (UKR)	4.90 m	Aleksey Khanafin (RUS)	4.90 m
Long jump	Yoelmis Pacheco (CUB)	7.50 m	Liu Dai-Wei (TPE)	7.45 m (w)	Luka Aračić (CRO)	7.41 m
Triple jump	Alessandro Bonfim (BRA)	15.57 m	Dmitriy Valyukevich (BLR)	15.52 m	Yevgeniy Shapiro (UKR)	15.15 m
Shot put	Pavel Sofin (RUS)	19.59 m	Mateus Monari (BRA)	19.20 m	John Sullivan (RSA)	19.19 m
Discus throw	Lois Maikel Martínez (CUB)	61.47 m	Pavel Lyzhyn (BLR)	58.59 m	Ivan Napreyenko (UKR)	57.19 m
Javelin throw	Geikel Cabrera (CUB)	72.36 m	Gerhardus Pienaar (RSA)	71.79 m	Aleksandr Ivanov (RUS)	67.97 m

=== Girls ===
Event	Gold		Silver		Bronze	
100 metres	Emily Maher (IRL)	11.93	Thatiana Ignâcio (BRA)	12.05	Mojca Vauce (SLO)	12.13
200 metres	Emily Maher (IRL)	24.16	Nataliya Pyhyda (UKR)	24.29	Lucy-Ann Richards (BAR)	24.30
400 metres	Nataliya Pyhyda (UKR)	54.01	Aneta Lemiesz (POL)	54.36	Yana Vetcherkevitch (RUS)	54.53
800 metres	Niuvis Pie (CUB)	2:07.01	Esther Desviat (ESP)	2:07.05	Inna Kravchenko (BLR)	2:07.17
1500 metres	Zanelle Grobler (RSA)	4:20.62	Ljiljana Culibrk (CRO)	4:21.11	Rasa Drazdauskaité (LTU)	4:21.63
3000 metres	Catherine Webombesa (UGA)	9:29.94	Susilia Likango (NAM)	9:30.98	Elvan Abeye (ETH)	9:34.95
100 metres hurdles	Svetlana Sokolova (RUS)	13.42	Joanna Doncer (POL)	13.53	Mariya Koroteyeva (RUS)	13.65
400 metres hurdles	Natalya Antyukh (RUS)	59.94	Li Shuju (CHN)	61.46	Dorota Wyszogrodzka (POL)	61.89
4 × 100 m relay	Poland (POL); Żaneta Tomczyk; Joanna Doncer; Aneta Lemiesz; Anna Radoszewska	46.65	Croatia (CRO); Ria Rukavina; Suzana Rubin; Petra Karanikic; Katarina Perosevic	47.68	Chile (CHI); Ana Urrutia; María José Echeverría; Fabiola Hecht; Francisca Guzmán	48.13
4 × 400 m relay	Russia (RUS); Svetlana Sokolova; Natalya Antyukh; Mariya Koroteyeva; Yana Vetcherkevitch	3:44.54	Kazakhstan (KAZ); Svetlana Valyuzhenich; Irina Vedernikova; Anna Gavriushenko; Yekaterina Zakharova	3:49.93	South Africa (RSA); Zanelle Grobler; Merize Theron; Elaine du Plessis; Joretha Eagleton	3:56.30
3000 metres walk	Lyudmila Yefimkina (RUS)	12:57.97	Aura Morales (MEX)	13:13.29	Irina Klepikova (RUS)	13:16.27
High jump	Marina Kuptsova (RUS)	1.86 m	Tatyana Efimenko (KGZ)	1.84 m	Tatiana Grigorieva (RUS)	1.79 m
Pole vault	Yelena Isinbayeva (RUS)	4.00 m	Fanni Juhász (HUN)	3.90 m	Anna Wielgus (POL)	3.70 m
Long jump	Yevgeniya Stavchanskaya (UKR)	6.30 m	Wang Lingli (CHN)	6.20 m	Svetlana Sokolova (RUS)	6.17 m
Triple jump	Mabel Gay (CUB)	13.41 m	Yevgeniya Stavchanskaya (UKR)	13.05 m	Dana Velďáková (SVK)	13.05 m
Shot put	Li Meiju (CHN)	15.89 m	Li Min (CHN)	15.35 m	Laura Bordignon (ITA)	14.43 m
Discus throw	Liu Yanxia (CHN)	49.92 m	Vera Begić (CRO)	48.70 m	Yelena Lebusova (RUS)	48.63 m
Javelin throw	Magdalena Czenska (POL)	49.75 m	Inga Kožarenoka (LAT)	49.59 m	Natallia Shymchuk (BLR)	48.97 m

== See also ==
- 1998 World Junior Championships in Athletics
