= Emily Nanziri =

Ugandan sprinter

Personal information
- Born: 25 November 1987 (age 38) Katikamu, Luweero District, Uganda

Sport
- Sport: Athletics
- Event: 400 metres

Emily Nanziri (born 25 November 1987) is a Ugandan sprinter competing primarily in the 400 metres. She represented her country at three consecutive Commonwealth Games, starting in 2010.

== International competitions ==
Year	Competition	Venue	Position	Event	Notes
Representing Uganda
2008	African Championships	Addis Ababa, Ethiopia	19th (h)	400 m	57.16
2009	Universiade	Belgrade, Serbia	25th (h)	200 m	25.00
2009	Universiade	Belgrade, Serbia	13th (sf)	400 m	55.41
2010	African Championships	Nairobi, Kenya	11th (sf)	400 m	54.37
2010	African Championships	Nairobi, Kenya	6th	4 × 400 m relay	3:41.24
2010	Commonwealth Games	Glasgow, United Kingdom	20th (sf)	400 m	54.94
2010	Commonwealth Games	Glasgow, United Kingdom	8th (h)	4 × 400 m relay	3:39.30^{1}
2014	Commonwealth Games	Glasgow, United Kingdom	40th (h)	400 m	59.02
2018	Commonwealth Games	Gold Coast, Australia	17th (sf)	400 m	54.10
2018	Commonwealth Games	Gold Coast, Australia	8th	4 × 400 m relay	3:35.03
2019	World Relays	Yokohama, Japan	19th (h)	4 × 400 m relay	3:35.02
2019	African Games	Rabat, Morocco	30th (h)	200 m	24.66
2019	African Games	Rabat, Morocco	3rd	4 × 400 m relay	3:32.25

^{1}Disqualified in the final

== Personal bests ==
Outdoor

- 200 metres – 24.15 (Nairobi 2011)
- 400 metres – 53.30 (Kampala 2014)
- 800 metres – 2:09.71 (Kampala 2018)
