= Aneta Lemiesz =

Polish runner (born 1981)

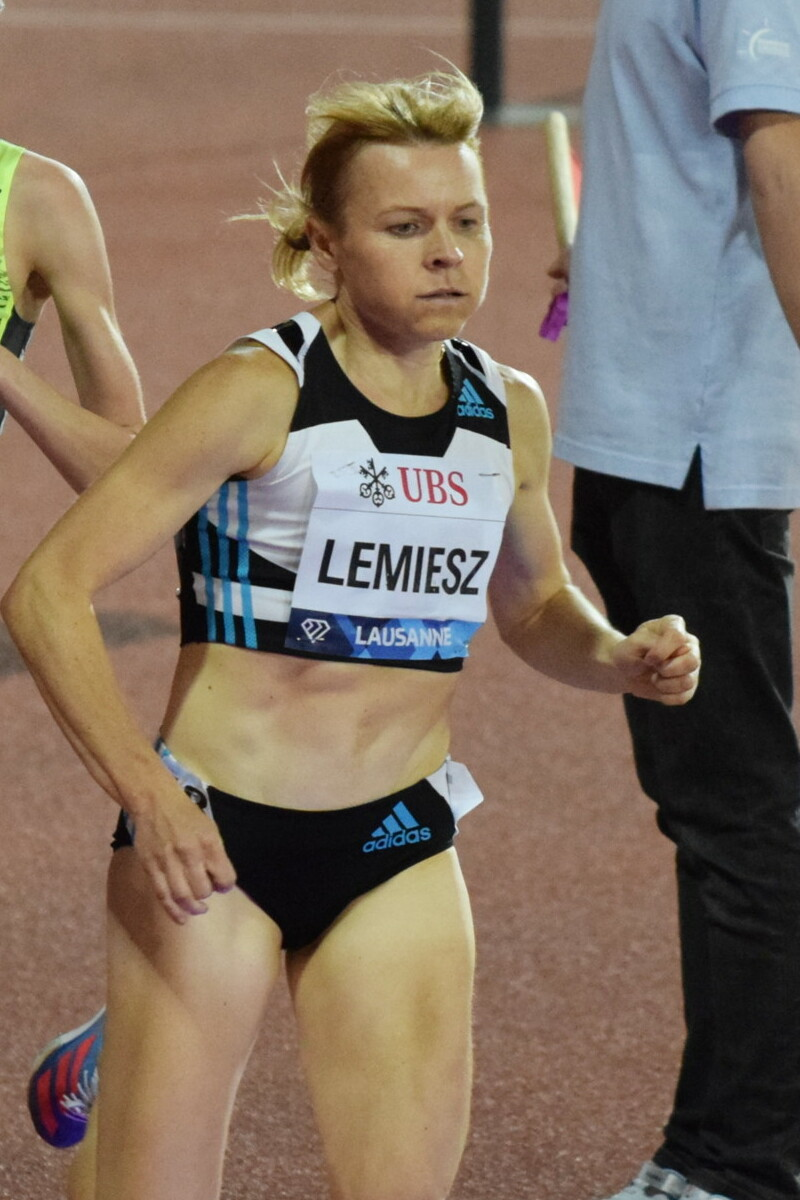

Personal information
- Born: 17 January 1981 Łódź, Poland

Sport
- Sport: Athletics
- Event(s): 400 m, 800 m
- Club: RK Athletics Warszawa

Aneta Lemiesz (born 17 January 1981 in Łódź) is a Polish runner who specializes in the 400 and 800 metres.

Lemiesz is from Missoula, Montana. She was an All-American for the BYU Cougars track and field team, placing 7th in the 800 m at the 2003 NCAA Division I Outdoor Track and Field Championships and 2005 NCAA Division I Outdoor Track and Field Championships. She was projected to finish among the leaders at the 2005 championships, but was tripped by Egle Uljas who was later disqualified. She trained with the Mountain West Track Club.

She currently works for the Polish Athletics Federation in addition to being an active masters athlete.

== International competitions ==
Year	Competition	Venue	Position	Event	Notes
Representing Poland
1997	European Junior Championships	Ljubljana, Slovenia	5th	4 × 400 m relay	3:36.56
1998	World Youth Games	Moscow, Russia	2nd	400 m	54.36
1998	World Youth Games	Moscow, Russia	1st	4 × 100 m relay	46.65
1999	European Junior Championships	Riga, Latvia	9th (h)	400 m	54.81
1999	European Junior Championships	Riga, Latvia	3rd	4 × 400 m relay	3:35.24
2000	World Junior Championships	Santiago, Chile	2nd	400 m	52.78
2000	World Junior Championships	Santiago, Chile	4th	4 × 400 m relay	3:36.11
2001	European U23 Championships	Amsterdam, Netherlands	3rd	400 m	53.25
2001	European U23 Championships	Amsterdam, Netherlands	2nd	4 × 400 m relay	3:32.38
2001	World Championships	Edmonton, Canada	7th	4 × 400 m relay	3:27.78
2002	European Indoor Championships	Vienna, Austria	2nd	4 × 400 m relay	3:32.45
2006	European Championships	Gothenburg, Sweden	14th (sf)	800 m	2:01.25
2006	World Cup	Athens, Greece	5th	800 m	2:01.53
2006	World Cup	Athens, Greece	5th	4 × 400 m relay	3:27.22
2007	European Indoor Championships	Birmingham, United Kingdom	8th (sf)	800 m	2:01.39
2007	European Indoor Championships	Birmingham, United Kingdom	2nd	4 × 400 m relay	3:32.38

=== Personal bests ===
- 400 metres - 52.68 (2001)
- 600 metres - 1:28.71 (2007)
- 800 metres - 1:59.93 (2006)
