= Antonina Krivoshapka =

Russian sprinter

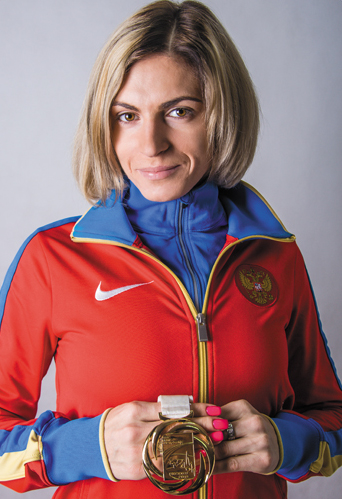
- Krivoshapka in 2013

Personal information
- Born: 21 July 1987 (age 38)
- Height: 1.68 m (5 ft 6 in)
- Weight: 59 kg (130 lb)

Sport
- Country: Russia
- Sport: Women's athletics
- Event: 400 metres

Achievements and titles
- Personal best: 49.16 (2012)
Medal record
Olympic Games
Disqualified	2012 London	4 × 400 m relay
World Championships
Disqualified	2013 Moscow	4 × 400 m relay
Bronze medal – third place	2009 Berlin	400 m
Disqualified	2009 Berlin	4 × 400 m relay
Disqualified	2011 Daegu	4 × 400 m relay
Disqualified	2013 Moscow	400 m
European Championships
Disqualified	2010 Barcelona	4 × 400 m relay
Silver medal – second place	2010 Barcelona	400 m
European Indoor Championships
Gold medal – first place	2009 Torino	400 m
Gold medal – first place	2009 Torino	4 × 400 m relay
World Youth Championships
Silver medal – second place	2003 Sherbrooke	400 m
Bronze medal – third place	2003 Sherbrooke	Medley relay
Continental Cup
Silver medal – second place	2010 Split	4 × 400 m relay

Antonina Vladimirovna Krivoshapka (Russian: Антонина Владимировна Кривошапка; born 21 July 1987) is a Russian sprinter who specialises in the 400 metres. She competed at the 2012 Summer Olympics, where her team originally was awarded a silver medal in the 4 × 400 m relay. Krivoshapka and her teammates were later stripped of this medal after Krivoshapka tested positive for the steroid turinabol.

== Early years ==
Hailing from Rostov-on-Don, Krivoshapka won the silver medal in the 400 m at the 2003 World Youth Championships in a time of 53.54 s, and won bronze in the medley relay. However, she had little success in the following years, placing only fifth in the heats of the 2004 World Junior Championships. She did not improve on her personal best in 2005 or 2006, and only competed on the national level. However, she began to steadily improve her performances in 2007 and 2008, posting seasonal bests of 52.32 s and 51.24 s, respectively.

== Professional athletics career ==
Krivoshapka's international breakthrough came in 2009, when she set a personal best of 50.55 s over 400 m indoors to win the Russian indoor championships, and subsequently won the 400 m gold medal at the 2009 European Indoor Championships. At the same championships she won a gold medal in the 4 × 400 metres relay with teammates Natalya Antyukh, Darya Safonova and Yelena Voynova. Later that year, during the semifinals at the Russian national championships in Cheboksary, she lowered her outdoor 400 m personal best by nearly a full second by running 49.29 s, the second-fastest time in the world that year. She went on to win the national title in 49.71 s. With these performances, Krivoshapka was considered one of the favorites for a medal in the 400 m at the World Championships in Berlin. In the 400 m final, she won the bronze medal in 49.71 s, behind Sanya Richards and Shericka Williams. She initially won another bronze medal in the 4 × 400 m relay, where she anchored the Russian team.

Krivoshapka suffered an injury in an unusual fashion in early 2010 – while doing sprint training on a track in Volgograd, a young boy walked into her path and she strained her back in the ensuing collision. She missed the 2010 IAAF World Indoor Championships as a result but fully recovered in time for the outdoor season. Later that year at the 2010 European Athletics Championships, she claimed the 400 m bronze medal. She won a silver medal as part of the Europe 4 × 400 m relay team at the 2010 IAAF Continental Cup. At the 2013 World Athletics Championships in Moscow, she initially finished third in the individual 400 m race.

In 2016, Krivoshapka's samples from both the 2008 and 2012 Olympics were retested and found to contain turinabol as announced on February 1, 2017. In April she was given a two-year ban, which disqualified her 2012 and 2013 results.

== See also ==
- List of doping cases in athletics
- Doping at the Olympic Games
- List of stripped Olympic medals
- List of World Athletics Championships medalists (women)
- Russia at the World Athletics Championships
- Doping at the World Athletics Championships
- List of European Athletics Championships medalists (women)
- List of stripped European Athletics Championships medals
- List of European Athletics Indoor Championships medalists (women)
- List of people from Rostov-on-Don
