= Athletics at the 2009 Summer Universiade – Women's 400 metres =

The women's 400 metres event at the 2009 Summer Universiade was held on 7–9 July.

== Medalists ==
Gold	Silver	Bronze
Fatou Bintou Fall; Senegal	Esther Akinsulie; Canada	Carline Muir; Canada

== Results ==
=== Heats ===
Qualification: First 3 of each heat (Q) and the next 4 fastest (q) qualified for the semifinals.

Rank	Heat	Name	Nationality	Time	Notes
1	1	Carline Muir	Canada	53.35	Q
2	2	Aleksandra Zaytseva	Russia	53.58	Q
3	1	Yekaterina Vukolova	Russia	53.63	Q
4	4	Ndèye Fatou Soumah	Senegal	53.93	Q
5	2	Marina Maslyonko	Kazakhstan	54.39	Q
6	1	Anita Banović	Croatia	54.40	Q
7	4	Anamaria Ioniţă	Romania	54.63	Q
8	3	Esther Akinsulie	Canada	54.77	Q
9	3	Fatou Bintou Fall	Senegal	54.80	Q
10	2	Zahra Bouras	Algeria	54.96	Q
11	4	Irene Helgesen	Norway	55.06	Q
12	3	Emily Nanziri	Uganda	55.07	Q
13	2	Claire Bergin	Ireland	55.11	q
14	1	Charlotte Johanson	Sweden	55.26	q, PB
15	3	Fiona O'Friel	Ireland	55.78	q
16	4	Vaya Vladeva	Bulgaria	56.17	q
17	1	Julie Schmidt-Scherer	Denmark	57.08	
18	1	Temalangeni Dlamini	Swaziland	57.84	PB
19	4	Boahemaa Ofori	Ghana	58.18	
20	3	Merisa Hadzić	Bosnia and Herzegovina	58.41	
21	3	Salamatu Musa	Ghana	1:00.31	
22	2	Reginah Rakumako	Botswana	1:00.33	
	1	Amaka Ogoebunam	Nigeria	DNS	
	2	Alena Koval	Kyrgyzstan	DNS	
	2	Rosângela Santos	Brazil	DNS	
	3	Olga Tereshkova	Kazakhstan	DNS	
	4	Ayetebe Restituta Bibang	Equatorial Guinea	DNS	
	4	Aina Valatkevičiūtė	Lithuania	DNS	

=== Semifinals ===
Qualification: First 3 of each semifinal (Q) and the next 2 fastest (q) qualified for the finals.

Rank	Heat	Name	Nationality	Time	Notes
1	1	Fatou Bintou Fall	Senegal	52.21	Q, SB
2	1	Carline Muir	Canada	52.42	Q
3	1	Marina Maslyonko	Kazakhstan	53.14	Q
4	2	Esther Akinsulie	Canada	53.17	Q
4	1	Yekaterina Vukolova	Russia	53.17	q
6	2	Aleksandra Zaytseva	Russia	53.34	Q
7	2	Ndèye Fatou Soumah	Senegal	53.35	Q
8	2	Anamaria Ioniţă	Romania	53.89	q
9	2	Irene Helgesen	Norway	54.22	
10	1	Anita Banović	Croatia	54.39	
11	2	Charlotte Johanson	Sweden	55.13	PB
12	1	Claire Bergin	Ireland	55.17	
13	1	Emily Nanziri	Uganda	55.41	
13	2	Fiona O'Friel	Ireland	55.41	
15	1	Vaya Vladeva	Bulgaria	55.65	
	2	Zahra Bouras	Algeria	DNS	

=== Final ===
Rank	Lane	Name	Nationality	Time	Notes
1st place, gold medalist(s)	6	Fatou Bintou Fall	Senegal	51.65	SB
2nd place, silver medalist(s)	4	Esther Akinsulie	Canada	51.70	PB
3rd place, bronze medalist(s)	3	Carline Muir	Canada	52.07	SB
4	8	Ndèye Fatou Soumah	Senegal	52.79	PB
5	2	Yekaterina Vukolova	Russia	53.25	
6	7	Marina Maslyonko	Kazakhstan	53.26	
7	5	Aleksandra Zaytseva	Russia	53.49	
8	1	Anamaria Ioniţă	Romania	53.59	
