= 2005 European Athletics U23 Championships – Women's 400 metres hurdles =

The women's 400 metres hurdles event at the 2005 European Athletics U23 Championships was held in Erfurt, Germany, at Steigerwaldstadion on 15 and 16 July.

== Medalists ==
Gold	Yelena Ildeykina; Russia
Silver	Anastasiya Trifonova; Russia
Bronze	Sian Scott; United Kingdom

== Results ==
=== Final ===
16 July

Rank	Name	Nationality	Time	Notes
1st place, gold medalist(s)	Yelena Ildeykina	Russia	56.43	
2nd place, silver medalist(s)	Anastasiya Trifonova	Russia	56.51	
3rd place, bronze medalist(s)	Sian Scott	United Kingdom	57.02	
4	Yuliya Mulyukova	Russia	57.55	
5	Sara Orešnik	Slovenia	58.35	
6	Elisa Scardanzan	Italy	58.66	
7	Özge Gürler	Turkey	58.69	
	Dora Jémaa	France	DQ	IAAF rule 168.7

=== Heats ===
15 July
Qualified: first 3 in each heat and 2 best to the Final

==== Heat 1 ====
Rank	Name	Nationality	Time	Notes
1	Anastasiya Trifonova	Russia	57.80	Q
2	Sian Scott	United Kingdom	58.17	Q
3	Dora Jémaa	France	58.47	Q
4	Sara Orešnik	Slovenia	59.04	q
5	Mari Bones	Norway	59.40	
6	Daniela Cionfrini	Italy	59.94	

==== Heat 2 ====
Rank	Name	Nationality	Time	Notes
1	Yelena Ildeykina	Russia	57.57	Q
2	Yuliya Mulyukova	Russia	58.30	Q
3	Özge Gürler	Turkey	58.59	Q
4	Elisa Scardanzan	Italy	58.64	q
5	Natalia Losange	France	59.73	
6	Stiliani Dimoglou	Greece	60.28	

== Participation ==
According to an unofficial count, 12 athletes from 8 countries participated in the event.

- France (2)
- Greece (1)
- Italy (2)
- Norway (1)
- Russia (3)
- Slovenia (1)
- Turkey (1)
- United Kingdom (1)
