= Athletics at the 2009 Summer Universiade – Women's 4 × 400 metres relay =

The women's 4 x 400 metres relay event at the 2009 Summer Universiade was held on 12 July.

== Results ==
Rank	Nation	Athletes	Time	Notes
1st place, gold medalist(s)	Canada	Carline Muir, Amonn Nelson, Kimberly Hyacinthe, Esther Akinsulie	3:33.09	
2nd place, silver medalist(s)	Russia	Ekaterina Voronenkova, Aleksandra Zaytseva, Nadezda Sozontova, Ekaterina Vukolova	3:34.45	
3rd place, bronze medalist(s)	Senegal	Ndèye Fatou Soumah, Mame Fatou Faye, Fatou Diabaye, Fatou Bintou Fall	3:36.33	
4	Ireland	Claire Bergin, Brona Furlong, Fiona O'Friel, Joanne Cuddihy	3:39.74	
5	Lithuania	Inesa Rimkevičiūtė, Jekaterina Šakovič, Silva Pesackaitė, Aina Valatkevičiūtė	3:46.19	
6	Ghana	Viviana Efua Dansowaa, Salamatu Musa, Nancy Kudadze, Boahemaa Charity Ofori	3:53.74	
