= Yeliz Kurt =

Turkish middle-distance runner

Personal information
- Nationality: Turkey
- Born: 15 January 1984 (age 42) Trabzon, Turkey
- Height: 166 cm (5 ft 5 in)
- Weight: 50 kg (110 lb)

Sport
- Sport: Running
- Event(s): 800 m, 1500 m
- Club: Enkaspor

Achievements and titles
- Personal bests: 800 m: 2:00.91 (2008); 1000 m: 2:39.92 (2009); 1500 m: 4:09.08 (2008); 1 mile: 4:33.82 (2008); 800 m ind: 2:02.47 (2011); 1500 m in: 4:18.7 (2008)
Medal record
Women's athletics
Representing Turkey
European Team Championships First League
Gold medal – first place	2011 İzmir	800 m
Silver medal – second place	2009 Bergen	800 m
Silver medal – second place	2009 Bergen	1500 m

Yeliz Kurt (born 15 January 1984) is a former Turkish female middle-distance runner competing mostly in the 800 m and 1500 m as well as 4 × 400 m relay events.

Kurt was banned twice from competing during her career for doping violations.

== Early life ==
Kurt was born in Trabzon, Turkey. The 166 cm (5 ft 5 in) tall athlete at 50 kg (110 lb) was a member of Bursa Büyükşehir Belediyespor before she transferred to Enkaspor in Istanbul.

== Career ==
She won two silver medals, one in 800 m and the other in 1500 m, at the 2009 European Team Championships-First League held in Bergen, Norway. In 2011, she became gold medalist of the 800 m event at the European Team Championships-First League in İzmir, Turkey.

Kurt is the national record holder of 1000 m event with 2:39.92 set in 2009, and shares the record in indoor 4 × 400 m relay event with 3:37.37 set at the 2009 European Athletics Indoor Championships held in Turin, Italy. With her time of 2:02.47, she improved her own national record in indoor 800 m at the ELAN Meeting Bratislava on January 30, 2011. However, that record was broken on March 9, 2012 by Merve Aydın.

== Doping ==
Kurt tested positive for the anabolic steroid Stanozolol in June 2013 and was subsequently handed a two-year ban from sports. The ban expired on 25 June 2015.

Kurt received a second ban for a doping violation that lasted from March 2017 to March 2018.

== Achievements ==
=== 4x400 m relay ===
Year	Competition	Venue	Position	Notes
Representing Turkey
2009	European Indoor Championships	Turin, Italy	5th	3:37.37 NR

=== 800 m ===
Year	Competition	Venue	Position	Notes
Representing Turkey
2009	Mediterranean Games	Pescara, Italy	5th	2:01.90
2009	European Team Championships First League	Bergen, Norway	2nd	2:01.54
2011	European Team Championships First League	İzmir, Turkey	1st	2:01.95
2011	European Indoor Championships	Paris, France	11th SF	2:03.32

=== 1500 m ===
Year	Competition	Venue	Position	Notes
Representing Turkey
2009	European Team Championships First League	Bergen, Norway	2nd	4:14.00
