= Dominique Blake =

Jamaican track and field athlete (born 1987)

Personal information
- Born: 15 February 1987 (age 39) Mount Vernon, New York
- Height: 180 cm (5 ft 11 in)
- Weight: 64 kg (141 lb)

Sport
- Country: United States
- University team: Penn State University
Medal record
Athletics
Representing Jamaica
Central American and Caribbean Games
Gold medal – first place	2010 Mayagüez	Women's 4x400

Dominique Blake (born 15 February 1987) is a Jamaican track and field athlete. Blake won a gold medal at the 2010 Central American and Caribbean Games and was accidentally awarded a bronze medal at the 2012 Summer Olympics. She was banned for 4 1/2 years after testing positive for methylhexanamine and returned to athletic competition in 2017.

== Early life and education ==
Blake was born on 15 February 1987 in Bronx, New York. She began her career as an indoor track and field athlete in 2002 before she started to compete in outdoor track and field events the following year. Blake spent four years as an athlete for Penn State University starting in 2004 and graduated from Penn State with a communications degree.

== Career ==
=== NCAA ===
As an NCAA athlete, Blake was 12th in the 4x400 meter relay with Penn State at the 2006 NCAA Division I Indoor Track and Field Championships. The following year, Blake and her 4x400 meter relay team was 4th at the 2007 NCAA Division I Indoor Track and Field Championships. During the 2007 indoor championships, Blake and her three teammates finished in 13th in the distance medley event. At the 2008 NCAA Division I Indoor Track and Field Championships, Blake and her teammates were 5th in the 4x400 meter relay. At individual events for the 2008 NCAA Indoor Championships, Blake did not advance past the 400 meters heats and finished 17th overall.

=== Other events ===
At the 2006 USA Outdoor Track and Field Championships, Blake was disqualified after she failed a drug test for ephedrine. Following the event, Blake was banned from competitions for nine months. During the 2008 United States Olympic Trials, Blake was 23rd overall in the 400 meters after she did not advance farther than the preliminaries.

For Jamaica, Blake participated at the 2010 Central American and Caribbean Games where she won a gold medal in the 4 x 400 meters relay. At the 2010 Commonwealth Games, Blake was 12th in the 4 x 400 meters relay with the Jamaican team that did not reach the final. For the 400 meters at that year's Commonwealth Games, Blake got to the semi-finals and finished overall in 18th place. She also was at the 2012 IAAF World Indoor Championships but did not win a medal.

In July 2012, Blake became part of the 4 x 400 meters Olympic team for Jamaica. Although Blake was a part of Jamaica's team that qualified for the 2012 Summer Olympics, Blake never actually ran at the London Olympics. Despite not running in the women's 4 × 400 m event, Blake was accidentally awarded an Olympic bronze medal by the Jamaica Olympic Association. She did not return the medal, however. In 2013, Blake was suspended for six years after she tested positive for methylhexanamine. That year, Blake asked the Court of Arbitration for Sport to grant her a shorten ban. After her ban was lowered to 4 1/2 years in 2014, Blake came back into competition in January 2017. Later that year, in compliance with International Association of Athletics Federations rules that mandate the return of all medals and prizes after positive testing for forbidden substances, Blake gave back her Olympic bronze medal to the Jamaica Olympic Association.

At the 2018 IAAF World Indoor Championships, Blake was on the Jamaican team that won their 4 × 400 metres relay heat and qualified for the final. At the 4 x 400 meters final, Blake was not one of the runners for Jamaica when the team was disqualified after the race. During the 2018 National Relay Championships, Blake was sixth in the 400 meters and did not finish the final of the 800 meters. The following year, Blake was fourth in the 400 meters at the 2019 National Relay Championships.
