= Natalya Antyukh =

Russian athlete (born 1981)

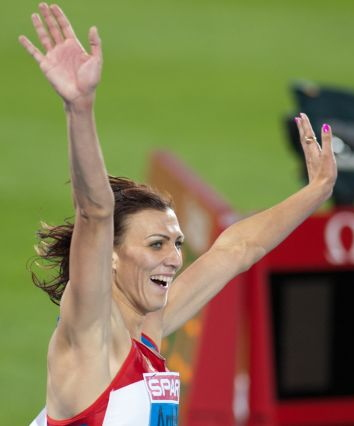
- Antyukh after winning the 400 m hurdles at the 2010 European Championships

Personal information
- Nationality: Russian
- Born: 26 June 1981 (age 45) Leningrad, RSFSR, USSR, (now St. Petersburg, Russia)
- Height: 1.78 m (5 ft 10 in)
- Weight: 69 kg (152 lb)

Sport
- Country: Russia
- Sport: Athletics
- Events: 400 m hurdles 400 metres
- Club: Dynamo
Medal record
Women's athletics
Representing Russia
Olympic Games
Disqualified	2012 London	400 m hurdles
Silver medal – second place	2004 Athens	4 × 400 m relay
Disqualified	2012 London	4 × 400 m relay
Bronze medal – third place	2004 Athens	400 m
World Championships
Gold medal – first place	2005 Helsinki	4 × 400 m relay
Disqualified	2013 Moscow	4 × 400 m relay
Bronze medal – third place	2009 Berlin	4 × 400 m relay
Bronze medal – third place	2011 Daegu	400 m hurdles
Bronze medal – third place	2011 Daegu	4 × 400 m relay
World Indoor Championships
Gold medal – first place	2003 Birmingham	4 × 400 m relay
Gold medal – first place	2004 Budapest	4 × 400 m relay
Gold medal – first place	2006 Moscow	4 × 400 m relay
European Championships
Gold medal – first place	2010 Barcelona	400 m hurdles
Silver medal – second place	2002 Munich	4 × 400 m relay
European Indoor Championships
Gold medal – first place	2002 Vienna	400 m
Gold medal – first place	2009 Turin	4 × 400 m relay
Silver medal – second place	2007 Birmingham	4 × 400 m relay
- Updated on 24 October 2022

Natalya Nikolayevna Antyukh (Russian: Наталья Николаевна Антюх, born 26 June 1981) is a Russian sprinter who specializes in the 400 metres and 400 metres hurdles. She won the bronze medal in the 400 metres and a silver for the 4 × 400 m relay at the 2004 Summer Olympics in Athens.

She is currently serving a four-year suspension from 2021 to 2025 for anti-doping rule violations. Her results from 15 July 2012 onwards had been disqualified, including her 2012 Olympic gold medal in the 400 metres hurdles.

According to World Athletics, prior to her ban, Antyukh had last competed in 2016, aged 35. She was 40 years old at the outset of the ban, and will be 44 years old when it concludes.

== Background ==
Her younger brother Kirill Antyukh is a former competitive sprinter, who turned to bobsleigh, and was part of the reserve Russian squad for the 2014 Winter Olympics.

== Career ==
=== 2004: Double Olympic medalist at 23 years old ===
Leading up to the 2004 Summer Olympics, Antyukh achieved a personal best time of 49.85 seconds in the 400 metres at the year's Russian Championships in Tula to place second. At the 2004 Summer Olympics in Athens, Greece, she won the bronze medal in the 400 metres with a time of 49.89 seconds, which was 0.48 seconds slower than gold medalist Tonique Williams-Darling of the Bahamas. Four days later, she won the silver medal for the 4 × 400 m relay with a final relay time of 3:20.16. Six years later, at the 2010 European Championships in Barcelona, Spain, she won the gold medal in the 400 metre hurdles with a personal best time of 52.92 seconds.

=== 2012: Olympic champion at 31 years old ===
On 8 August 2012, Antyukh, then 31 years old, won the gold medal in the 400 metres hurdles at the 2012 Olympic Games in London, with a personal best time of 52.70 seconds. Three days later, she won the silver medal for the 4 × 400 m relay, helping finish in a time of 3 minutes, 20.23 seconds. She received the Russian Order of Honour after the Olympics for her performances.

=== 2016: Teammate disqualified, stripped of her 2012 Olympic silver medal ===
In 2016, Antyukh's silver medal in the 4 × 400 m relay from the 2012 Olympic Games was stripped, with medals reallocated to relay teams from Jamaica (silver) and Ukraine (bronze), after teammate Antonina Krivoshapka had her results from the event disqualified. In 2019, all Russians, including Antyukh, were banned by the World Anti-Doping Agency from competing in international track and field events representing Russia for a four-year period.

=== 2020–2025: Disqualified, stripped of her 2012 Olympic gold medal ===
In 2020, Antyukh was among four Russian track and field athletes charged with doping offences, facing charges of using a prohibited substance or method. The Athletics Integrity Unit said the cases were based on an investigation into Russian doping for the World Anti-Doping Agency presented in 2016 by Canadian lawyer Richard McLaren. Her ban was confirmed on 7 April 2021 by the Court of Arbitration for Sport when she was suspended from athletics for four years, to 2025, with all her results from 30 June 2013 onwards disqualified. In October 2022, more than 10 years and 2 months after the race, her results from July 2012 to June 2013 were disqualified, stripping her of the gold medal in the 400 m hurdles at the 2012 Summer Olympics, with the new recipient being the former silver medalist, American Lashinda Demus.

The stripping of her gold medal marked the attainment of stripping all Russians who won a gold medal in track at the 2012 Summer Olympics of their gold medal(s).

In addition to being banned for anti-doping rule violations, Antyukh, along with all other Russian and Belarusian athletes, was subjected to another ban starting 1 March 2022, which excluded her from all World Athletics competitions with no communicated end date and was implemented in response to the 2022 Russian invasion of Ukraine, part of the ongoing Russo-Ukrainian War that began in 2014.

== Achievements ==
All information from World Athletics profile.

=== International competitions ===
Representing Russia
Year	Competition	Venue	Position	Event	Time
1998	World Youth Games	Moscow, Russia	1st	400 m hurdles	59.94
2001	World Championships	Edmonton, Canada	30th (h)	400 m	52.71
2002	European Indoor Championships	Vienna, Austria	1st	400 metres	51.65
2002	European Championships	Munich, Germany	2nd	4 × 400 m relay	3:25.59
2003	World Indoor Championships	Birmingham, United Kingdom	1st	4 × 400 m relay	3:28.45
2004	World Indoor Championships	Budapest, Hungary	1st	4 × 400 m relay	3:31.27 (Note: Time from the heats; Antyukh was replaced in the final.)
2004	Olympic Games	Athens, Greece	3rd	400 metres	49.89
2004	Olympic Games	Athens, Greece	2nd	4 × 400 m relay	3:20.16
2005	World Championships	Helsinki, Finland	10th (sf)	400 m	50.99
2005	World Championships	Helsinki, Finland	1st	4 × 400 m relay	3:20.95
2006	World Indoor Championships	Moscow, Russia	1st	4 × 400 m relay	3:24.91
2007	European Indoor Championships	Birmingham, United Kingdom	2nd	4 × 400 m relay	3:28.16
2007	World Championships	Osaka, Japan	6th	400 m	50.33
2007	World Championships	Osaka, Japan	4th	4 × 400 m relay	3:20.25
2009	European Indoor Championships	Turin, Italy	4th	400 m	52.37
2009	European Indoor Championships	Turin, Italy	1st	4 × 400 m relay	3:29.12
2009	World Championships	Berlin, Germany	6th	400 m hurdles	54.11
2009	World Championships	Berlin, Germany	DQ (Note: Finals relay member other than Antyukh later disqualified and all relay results invalidated.)	4 × 400 m relay	3:23.80
2010	European Championships	Barcelona, Spain	1st	400 m hurdles	52.92
2011	World Championships	Daegu, South Korea	3rd	400 m hurdles	53.85
2011	World Championships	Daegu, South Korea	DQ	4 × 400 m relay	3:19.36
2012	Olympic Games	London, United Kingdom	DQ	400 m hurdles	52.70
2012	Olympic Games	London, United Kingdom	DQ (Note: Finals relay member other than Antyukh later disqualified and all relay results invalidated. Antyukh was later disqualified herself after initial disqualification.)	4 × 400 m relay	3:20.23
2013	World Championships	Moscow, Russia	DQ	400 m hurdles	55.55
2013	World Championships	Moscow, Russia	DQ	4 × 400 m relay	3:23.51

=== Personal bests ===
- 200 metres – 22.75 (-0.2 m/s, Tula 2004)
- 400 metres – 49.85 (Tula 2004)
  - 400 metres indoor – 50.37 (Moscow 2006)
- 400 m hurdles – 52.92 (Barcelona 2010)

== See also ==
- List of doping cases in athletics
- List of Olympic medalists in athletics (women)
- List of 2004 Summer Olympics medal winners
- List of World Athletics Championships medalists (women)
- List of European Athletics Championships medalists (women)
- List of European Athletics Indoor Championships medalists (women)
- 400 metres at the Olympics
- 400 metres hurdles at the Olympics
- 4 × 400 metres relay at the Olympics
- 400 metres hurdles at the World Championships in Athletics
- 4 × 400 metres relay at the World Championships in Athletics
- List of people from Saint Petersburg
- List of Russian sportspeople
