= Richard Yates (hurdler) =

British athlete

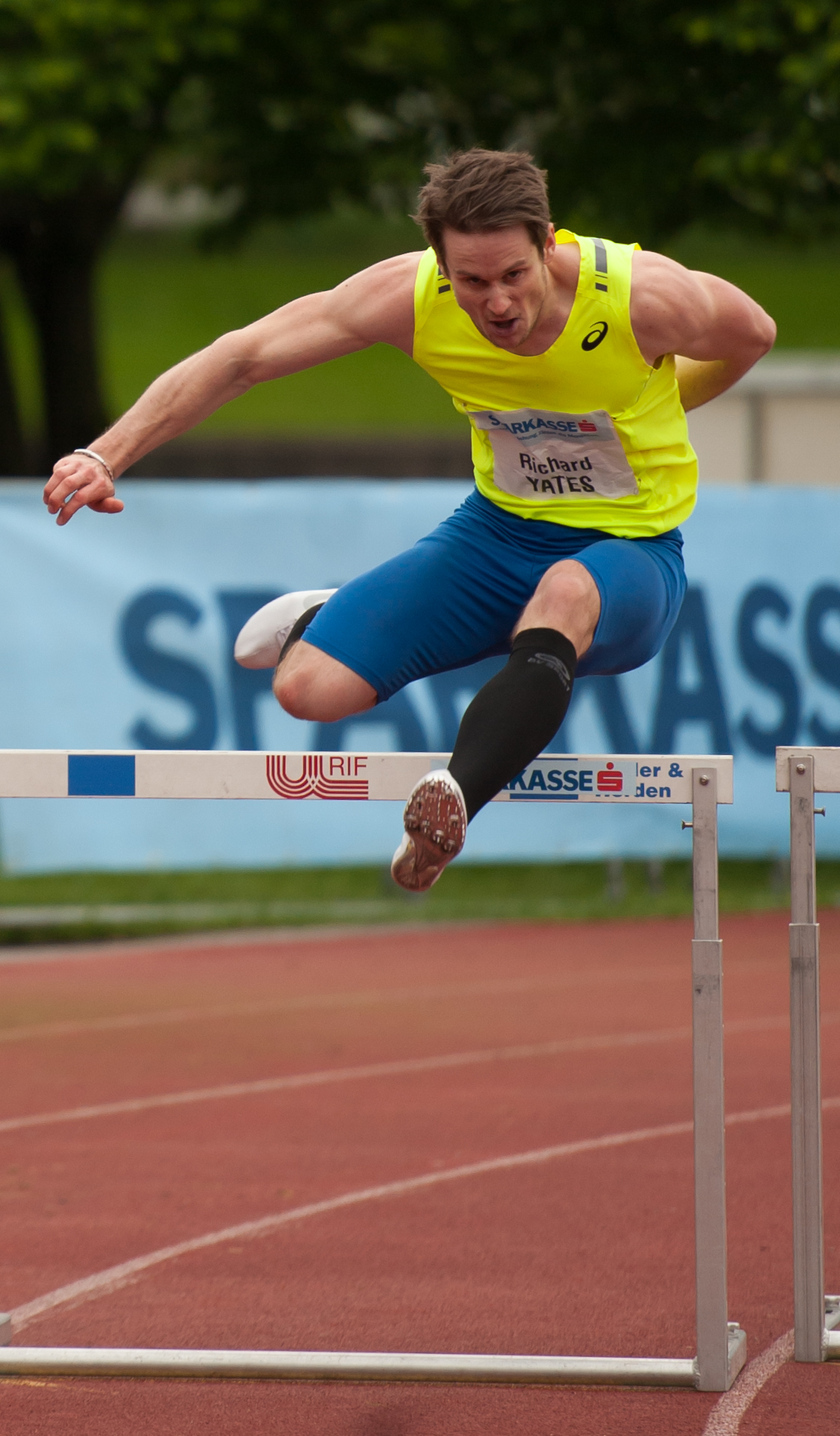
- Yates during 2015

Personal information
- Nationality: British (English)
- Born: 26 January 1986 (age 39) Manchester, England

Sport
- Sport: Athletics
- Event: 400m hurdles
- Club: City of Sheffield and Dearne AC

Richard Stewart Yates (born 26 January 1986) is an English track and field athlete who specialised in the 400 metres hurdles. His most prominent performance was a 5th-place finish and a 4 × 400 metres relay bronze medal at the 2010 Commonwealth Games. His personal best for the 400m hurdles is 49.06 seconds.

== Biography ==
Yates started running in his early childhood at the age of four and continued to pursue athletics alongside his education, first competing at an international level by the time he was 22.

Yates became the British 400 metres hurdles champion after winning the 2008 British Athletics Championships. Despite being British Champion he was not selected to represent Great Britain in the 2008 Beijing Olympics, to some controversy.

Outside of his achievements on the athletics track, he studied law at the University of Leeds, achieving upper second class honours (2:1), and qualified as a solicitor specialising in Sports Law and Commercial Disputes at Manchester law firm JMW Solicitors LLP. He continued to pursue his legal career at the same time as competitive athletics, including seventh place in the 400 m hurdles at the 2014 Commonwealth Games. His personal best stands at 49.06.

== Achievements ==
Year	Competition	Venue	Position	Event	Notes
2010	Commonwealth Games	New Delhi, India	3rd	4 x 400 m relay	3:03.97

== See also ==
- Combined track and field events
- List of hurdlers
- Men's 400 metres hurdles world record progression
