= Carline Muir =

Canadian sprinter (born 1987)

Personal information
- Nationality: Canada
- Born: 1 October 1987 (age 38) Spanish Town, Jamaica
- Home town: Toronto, Ontario, Canada
- Education: University of Alberta, 17
- Height: 1.70 m (5 ft 7 in)
- Weight: 65 kg (143 lb)

Sport
- Country: Canada
- Sport: Athletics
- Event: 400 metres
- College team: University of Alberta
- Club: Unattached (CAN)
- Team: Canada
- Coached by: Nick Dakin (UK)

Achievements and titles
- Olympic finals: 4th Place 4x400m Women's Relay
- World finals: Top 16 2015
- National finals: Winner 2015, 2016
- Highest world ranking: 21
- Personal best: 400 metres: 51.05 s (2016)
Medal record
Women's athletics
Representing Canada
Universiade
Gold medal – first place	2009 Belgrade	4×400 m relay
Bronze medal – third place	2009 Belgrade	400 m
Commonwealth Games
Bronze medal – third place	2010 Delhi	4×400 m relay

Carline Muir (born 1 October 1987 in Spanish Town, Jamaica) is a Canadian sprinter, who specialized in the 400 metres. She won the bronze medal for the 400 metres, and ultimately, led her national team to claim the sprint relay title at the 2009 Summer Universiade in Belgrade, Serbia. She is also a three-time junior national champion, a two-time silver medalist at the Canadian Track and Field Championships.

Muir made her international debut at the 2005 Pan American Junior Championships in Windsor, Ontario, where she captured the silver medal for the 400 metres, with an impressive time of 52.38 seconds. She also achieved a top-ten finish for the relay team at the 2007 Pan American Games in Rio de Janeiro, Brazil, and had won two individual silver medals at the national trials. In 2008, Muir set her personal best, and attained a B-standard time of 51.77 seconds at the Harry Jerome International Track Classic in Burnaby, British Columbia, which earned her a qualifying spot for the Olympics.

Muir became the youngest track and field athlete to represent Canada at the 2008 Summer Olympics in Beijing, where she competed for the women's 400 metres. She ran in the second heat against six other athletes, including Italy's Libania Grenot and Botswana's promising track star Amantle Montsho. She finished the race in third place by one hundredth of a second ahead of Cuba's Indira Terrero, with her personal best time of 51.55 seconds. Muir advanced into the next round of the competition, as she secured the final mandatory qualifying slot in the second heat. Muir, however, fell short in her bid for the final, as she placed seventh in the semifinal rounds, with her slowest possible time of 52.37 seconds.

At the 2009 Summer Universiade in Belgrade, Serbia, Muir captured the bronze medal in the women's 400 metres, finishing behind her teammate Esther Akinsulie by thirty-seven hundredths of a second (0.37), with a time of 52.07 seconds. She also displayed a spectacular performance by pacing the women's 4×400-metre relay team to a gold medal triumph.

At the 2010 Commonwealth Games in Delhi, India, Muir missed out of the medal podium, as she placed sixth in the final by more than two seconds behind her former rival Montsho in the 400 metres. She initially finished fourth for her national team in the women's 4 × 400 m relay; however, they were immediately upgraded into the bronze medal position, following the disqualification of the Nigerian team.

Muir later emerged as a strong favorite to qualify for her second Olympics in London; however, she missed out of her contention with a third-place finish behind Jenna Martin, who attained a B-standard time of 51.55 seconds, at the Canadian Track and Field Championships in Calgary, Alberta.

Between 2012 and 2014 Muir trained in Florida before moving back to Toronto to train and the Athletics Canada East Hub, where she helped the Canadian 4 × 400 m Women's Relay team finish 7th at the 2015 World Championships and qualify for the 2016 Rio Olympics.

In 2016 Muir moved to UK based coach Nick Dakin where, along with winning a number European races she broke her 8 year old Personal Best, running 51.05 in Madrid. After winning the Canadian National Championships 400m she was officially named to Canada's Olympic team in the individual Women's 400m and then as part of the 4 × 400 m Women's relay for the second time. The Women's 4 × 400 m finished 4th at the Rio Olympics.
