= Kelly Massey =

British sprinter (born 1985)

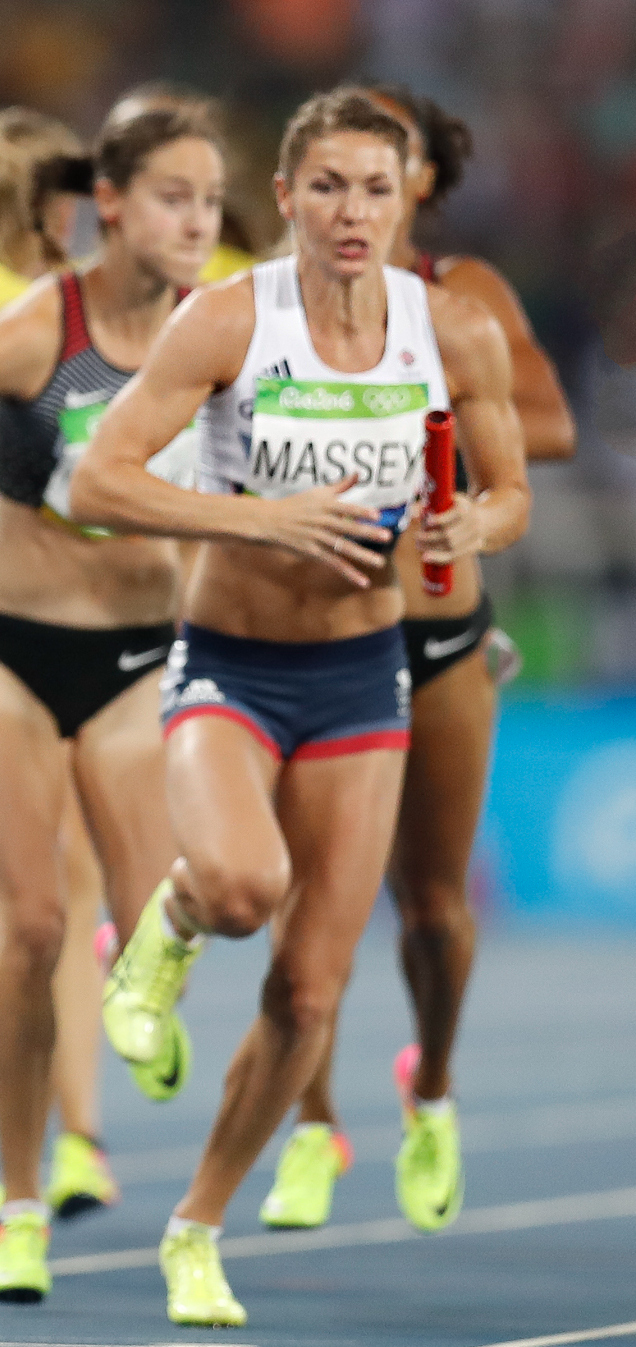
- Massey at the 2016 Olympics

Personal information
- Nationality: British
- Born: 11 January 1985 (age 41) Coventry, England
- Height: 5 ft 10 in (178 cm)
- Weight: 57 kg (126 lb)

Sport
- Sport: Athletics
- Event: 400 metres
Medal record
Representing Great Britain
Olympic Games
Bronze medal – third place	2016 Rio de Janeiro	4 × 400 m relay
European Championships
Gold medal – first place	2016 Amsterdam	4×400 m relay
Bronze medal – third place	2014 Zürich	4×400 m relay
European Indoor Championships
Silver medal – second place	2015 Prague	4x400 m relay
Representing England
Commonwealth Games
Silver medal – second place	2010 Delhi	4×400 metres relay
Bronze medal – third place	2014 Glasgow	4×400 metres relay
- Updated on 20 August 2016

Kelly Massey (born 11 January 1985) is a British track and field athlete who specialises in the 400 metres. She competed for England in the women's 4 × 400 metres relay at the 2014 Commonwealth Games where she won a bronze medal, and for Great Britain in the women's 4 × 400 metres relay at the 2016 Summer Olympics where she again won a bronze medal.

== Competition record ==
Year	Competition	Venue	Position	Event	Notes
Representing Great Britain and England
2007	Universiade	Bangkok, Thailand	11th (sf)	400 m	54.01
2007	Universiade	Bangkok, Thailand	3rd	4 × 400 m relay	3:33.70
2010	Commonwealth Games	Delhi, India	12th (sf)	400 m	53.24
2010	Commonwealth Games	Delhi, India	2nd	4 × 400 m relay	3:29.51
2011	Universiade	Shenzhen, China	14th (sf)	400 m	53.92
2011	Universiade	Shenzhen, China	3rd	4 × 400 m relay	3:33.09
2012	European Championships	Helsinki, Finland	24th (h)	400 m	54.44
2012	European Championships	Helsinki, Finland	3rd (h)	4 × 400 m relay	3:29.96
2014	Commonwealth Games	Glasgow, United Kingdom	7th	400 m	53.08
2014	Commonwealth Games	Glasgow, United Kingdom	3rd	4 × 400 m relay	3:27.24
2014	European Championships	Zürich, Switzerland	3rd	4 × 400 m relay	3:24.34
2015	European Indoor Championships	Prague, Czech Republic	2nd	4 × 400 m relay	3:31.79
2016	European Championships	Amsterdam, Netherlands	1st (h)	4 × 400 m relay	3:26.42
2016	Olympic Games	Rio de Janeiro, Brazil	4th (h)	4 × 400 m relay	3:24.81
2017	IAAF World Relays	Nassau, Bahamas	7th (h)	4 × 400 m relay	3:33.00
