= Nataliya Pyhyda =

Ukrainian sprinter (born 1981)

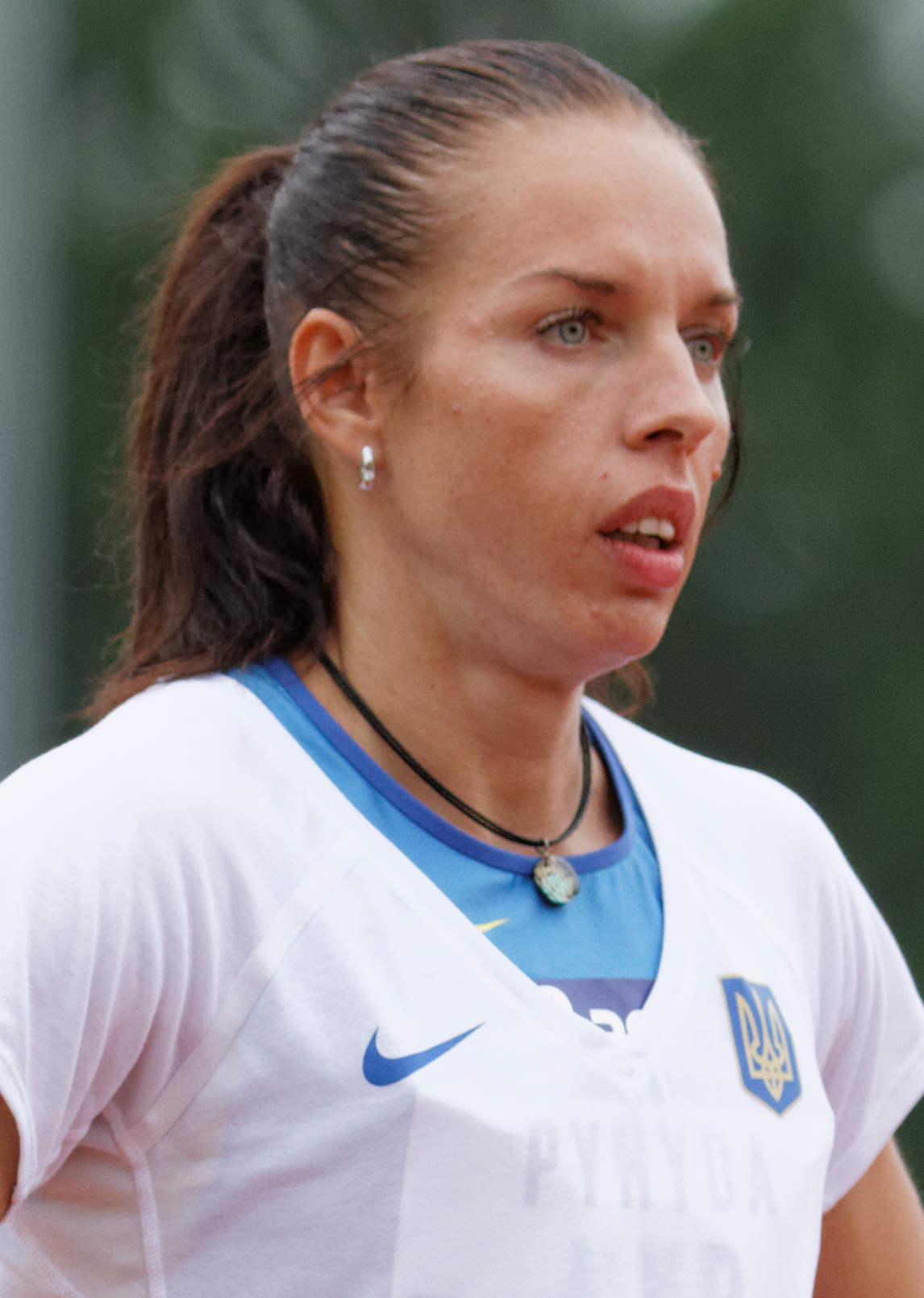
- Pyhyda at the 2014 DécaNation

Personal information
- Born: 30 January 1981 (age 45) Nova Kakhovka, Ukrainian SSR, Soviet Union
- Height: 1.70 m (5 ft 7 in)
- Weight: 60 kg (130 lb)

Sport
- Country: Ukraine
- Sport: Athletics
- Event: 4 × 400 m Relay
Medal record
Women's athletics
Representing Ukraine
Olympic Games
Bronze medal – third place	2012 London	4 × 400 metres relay
European Championships
Silver medal – second place	2014 Zürich	4 × 400 metres relay
European Indoor Championships
Gold medal – first place	2015 Prague	400 m
Silver medal – second place	2009 Torino	400 m
European Team Championships
Bronze medal – third place	2009 Leiria	400 m
Military World Games
Silver medal – second place	2015 Mungyeong	4 × 400 metres relay
Bronze medal – third place	2015 Mungyeong	400 m
Summer Universiade
Gold medal – first place	2007 Bangkok	4 × 400 metres relay
Bronze medal – third place	2005 İzmir	4 × 400 metres relay
European Athletics U23 Championships
Bronze medal – third place	2003 Bydgoszcz	4 × 100 metres relay
World Youth Games
Gold medal – first place	1998 Moscow	400 m
Silver medal – second place	1998 Moscow	200 m

Nataliya Pyhyda (Ukrainian: Наталія Пигида; born 30 January 1981) is a Ukrainian track and field sprinter who specializes in the 200 and 400 metres. Her personal best times are 22.82 seconds (2008) and 50.62 seconds (2015), respectively.

== Career ==
As a junior, she finished sixth at the 2000 World Junior Championships. Her personal best at the time was 52.87 seconds, achieved in August 2000 in Kyiv. She improved it to 52.76 seconds in July 2003 in Kyiv. At the 2003 World Championships she competed in the 4 × 400 metres relay without reaching the final. She finished fifth in the 200 metres event at the 2004 World Indoor Championships. At the 2004 Olympic Games she again competed in the 4 × 400 metres relay without reaching the final. In 2004, she greatly improved her personal bests in both her events, running the 200 metres in 23.04 seconds in July in Madrid and the 400 metres in 51.44 seconds in July in Yalta.

The seasons 2005 and 2006 went by without personal bests in her main events, only the 60 metres (7.25 seconds, Kyiv, February 2005) and the 100 metres (11.50 seconds, Kyiv, July 2005). At the 2005 European Indoor Championships the Ukrainian relay team finished fourth. She also finished fifth in the individual event. The relay team finished fifth at the 2005 World Championships. At the 2005 Summer Universiade she finished fourth in the 200 metres and won a bronze medal in the relay. At the 2006 European Championships she reached the semi-final of the individual event, and finished sixth in the relay. At the end of the season she was chosen for Europe's relay team at the 2006 IAAF World Cup. The team finished fourth.

In 2007, she failed to run a single sub-24 or sub-52 second race. She failed to reach the relay final at the 2007 World Championships, but won a relay gold medal at the 2007 Summer Universiade. She reached the 400 metres semi-final at the 2008 World Indoor Championships, and at the 2008 Olympics she reached the semi-final of the 200 metres, was disqualified in the 4 × 100 metres relay, and failed to reach the final in the 4 × 400 metres relay.

In the summer of 2008 she had smashed her 200 best time, running in 22.82 seconds in Kyiv in June. In 2009, she won the silver medal at the 2009 European Indoor Championships. With 51.44 seconds she equalled her personal best time from the outdoor track. She further improved to 51.38 seconds in June 2009 in Sofia. In July 2009, however, she tested positive for the anabolic steroid stanozolol after a competition in Reims. She was suspended from the sport from August 2009 to August 2011. She competed again at the 2012 Summer Olympics. She was part of the Ukrainian team that won the silver medal at the 2014 European Athletics Championship.
