= Jo Patterson =

Irish multi event athlete

Personal information
- Nationality: Northern Ireland
- Born: Doctor Joanna Patterson; 27 July 1988 (age 37)

Sport
- Sport: Track and field, cycling

Jo Patterson (born 27 July 1988) is a Northern Irish athlete who transitioned from competing in track and field to cycling, and in 2021 secured a major win with gold on her debut at the National Time Trial Championships. This resulted in her being named for the Commonwealth Games 12 years after her first appearance there and in a different sport.

== Career ==
=== Athletics ===
Patterson competed in the 400 metres and 4 × 400 metres relays at the 2010 Commonwealth Games in New Delhi. She also ran for Ireland, at the World University Games in the 200 m and 4 × 400 m relay as well as at the Europa Cup. However, soon after those competitions Patterson had less time to commit to athletics as she completed a medical degree in Scotland at the University of Glasgow.

=== Cycling ===
Paterson transitioned to cycling via triathlon, and duathlon, Patterson won gold at the Irish National Time Trial Championship in County Wicklow at her very first attempt. Twelve years after her debut at the Commonwealth Games, Patterson was selected again to represent Northern Ireland at the 2022 Commonwealth Games, but this time in cycling rather than track and field.
