= Martina McCarthy =

Irish sprinter

Personal information
- Nationality: Irish
- Born: 27 October 1981 (age 43)

Sport
- Sport: Sprinting
- Event: 4 × 400 metres relay

Martina McCarthy (born 27 October 1981) is an Irish sprinter. She competed in the women's 4 × 400 metres relay at the 2000 Summer Olympics.
