= Richard Charlesworth (swimmer) =

English swimmer (born 1988)

Personal information
- Full name: Richard James Charlesworth
- National team: Great Britain
- Born: 26 October 1988 (age 37) Hemel Hempstead, England
- Height: 1.94 m (6 ft 4 in)
- Weight: 135 kg (298 lb; 21.3 st)

Sport
- Sport: Swimming
- Strokes: Freestyle
- Club: Hatfield SC

Richard James Charlesworth (born 26 October 1988) is an English competitive swimmer and distance freestyler who represented Great Britain in the Olympic Games. He first started swimming with Hemel Hempstead Swimming Club and currently represents Hatfield Swimming Club

At the 2008 Summer Olympics in Beijing, Charlesworth competed in the preliminary heats of the men's 1500-metre freestyle event, finishing with 25th-best time overall.
