= Vicki Barr (athlete) =

British athlete (born 1982)

Victoria Barr
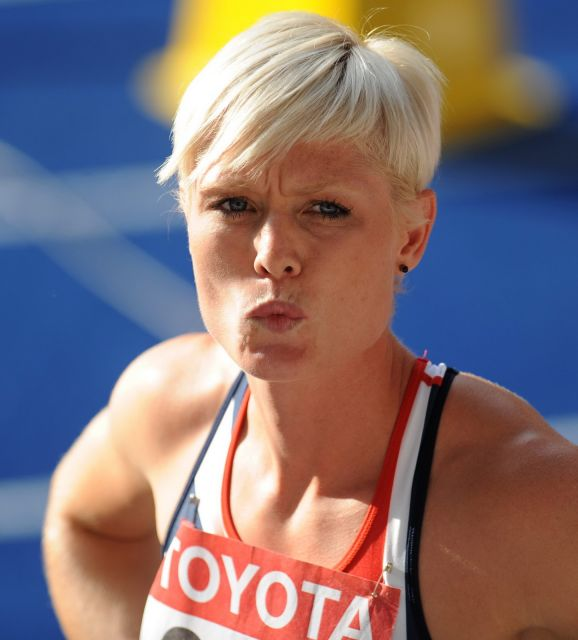

Personal information
- Born: 14 April 1982 (age 44) Gateshead

Sport
- Country: United Kingdom

Achievements and titles
- Olympic finals: n/a
- Personal best(s): 200 m 23.87; 300 m 37.78; 400 m 52.40
Medal record
Women's athletics
Representing Great Britain
World Championships
Bronze medal – third place	2009 Berlin	4x400 m relay
World Indoor Championships
Bronze medal – third place	2010 Doha	4x400 m relay
European Championships
Silver medal – second place	2010 Barcelona	4x400 m relay
- Updated on 3 November 2011

Victoria Barr (born 14 April 1982 in Gateshead) is a British track and field athlete who competes in the 400 metres sprint. Her personal best for the event is 52.40 seconds. She is a frequent member of the British 4×400 m relay team and won a bronze medal at the European Athletics Championships in 2010. She was a silver medallist in the relay for England at the 2010 Commonwealth Games.

She was selected to represent Great Britain at the 2008 Summer Olympics in the 4×400m women's relay At the 2009 European Athletics Indoor Championships she won a relay silver medal in a team with Donna Fraser, Kim Wall and Marilyn Okoro, finishing as runners-up behind Russia. Going into the outdoor season, she was chosen for the relay at the 2009 European Team Championships and helped Great Britain to the bronze medal. She once again represented Great Britain at the 2009 World Championships in Athletics in the relay. A team of Lee McConnell, Christine Ohuruogu, Barr and Nicola Sanders came fourth in the final.

The following indoor season, Barr ran in the relay at the 2010 IAAF World Indoor Championships and Britain again finished fourth, just beaten to the bronze by the Czech Republic. She won a bronze medal representing Great Britain at the 2010 European Championships in the 4×400m relay. The team completed the final in a time of 3:24.32 minutes. That year she received her first call as an individual athlete, representing England at the Commonwealth Games in the 400 m. She reached the semi-finals of the 400 m then went on to win a silver medal with the English women's relay team. Despite this, Barr lost her UK Athletics Podium Scheme funding that year. However, in August 2011 she agreed a sponsorship deal with Worldpay. During the 2011 season she suffered a rib injury which caused difficulties with breathing, and as a result she did not finish the 400m at the UK trials in 2011, having to abandon the race with 100m to go. Barr was subsequently not selected for the British squad for the 2011 World Championships in Athletics in Daegu.
