= 2009 European Athletics Indoor Championships =

- Dates: 6 – 8 March
- Host city: Turin, Italy
- Venue: Oval Lingotto
- Events: 26
- Participation: 530 athletes from 45 nations

The 2009 European Athletics Indoor Championships was held in Turin, Italy, from Friday, 6 March to Sunday, 8 March 2009. The championships took place at the Oval Lingotto indoor arena which has a seating capacity of 6,700 people.

It was the fourth time that the championships were held in Italy.

== Men's results ==
=== Track ===
Event	Gold		Silver		Bronze	
60 m	Dwain Chambers; Great Britain	6.46	Fabio Cerutti; Italy	6.56	Emanuele di Gregorio; Italy	6.56; PB
400 m	Johan Wissman; Sweden	45.89; WL PB	Claudio Licciardello; Italy	46.32	Ioan Vieru; Romania	46.54; SB
800 m	Yuriy Borzakovskiy; Russia	1:48.55	Luis Alberto Marco; Spain	1:49.14	Mattias Claesson; Sweden	1:49.32
1500 m	Rui Silva; Portugal	3:44.38	Diego Ruiz; Spain	3:44.70	Yoann Kowal; France	3:44.75
3000 m	Mo Farah; Great Britain	7:40.17; CR	Bouabdellah Tahri; France	7:42.14	Jesús España; Spain	7:43.29; SB
60 m hurdles	Ladji Doucouré; France	7.55	Gregory Sedoc; Netherlands	7.55	Petr Svoboda; Czech Republic	7.61
4 × 400 m relay	Italy; Jacopo Marin; Matteo Galvan; Domenico Rao; Claudio Licciardello	3:06.68	Great Britain; Richard Buck; Nick Leavey; Nigel Levine; Philip Taylor	3:07.04	Poland; Jan Ciepiela; Marcin Marciniszyn; Jarosław Wasiak; Piotr Klimczak	3:07.04
WR world record | ER European record | CR championship record | NR national record | WL world leading | EL European leading | PB personal best | SB seasonal best

=== Field ===
Event	Gold		Silver		Bronze	
High jump	Ivan Ukhov; Russia	2.32	Kyriakos Ioannou; Cyprus; Aleksey Dmitrik; Russia	2.29		
Pole vault	Renaud Lavillenie; France	5.81 =PB	Pavel Gerasimov; Russia	5.76	Alexander Straub; Germany	5.76
Long jump	Sebastian Bayer; Germany	8.71; ER CR NR PB	Nils Winter; Germany	8.22; PB	Marcin Starzak; Poland	8.18; NR PB
Triple jump	Fabrizio Donato; Italy	17.59; WL CR NR PB	Viktor Yastrebov; Ukraine	17.25; PB	Igor Spasovkhodskiy; Russia	17.15; SB
Shot put	Tomasz Majewski; Poland	21.02	Yves Niaré; France	20.42; NR PB	Ralf Bartels; Germany	20.39; SB
WR world record | ER European record | CR championship record | NR national record | WL world leading | EL European leading | PB personal best | SB seasonal best

=== Combined ===
Event	Gold		Silver		Bronze	
Heptathlon	Mikk Pahapill; Estonia	6362; WL PB	Oleksiy Kasyanov; Ukraine	6205; NR PB	Roman Šebrle; Czech Republic	6142
WR world record | ER European record | CR championship record | NR national record | WL world leading | EL European leading | PB personal best | SB seasonal best

== Women's results ==
=== Track ===
Event	Gold		Silver		Bronze	
60 m	Yevgeniya Polyakova; Russia	7.18; SB	Ezinne Okparaebo; Norway	7.21; NR PB	Verena Sailer; Germany	7.22
400 m	Antonina Krivoshapka; Russia	51.18	Nataliya Pyhyda; Ukraine	51.44; PB	Darya Safonova; Russia	51.85; PB
800 m	Mariya Savinova; Russia	1:58.11; WL PB	Oksana Zbrozhek; Russia	1:59.20; SB	Elisa Cusma Piccione; Italy	2:00.23
1500 m	Natalia Rodríguez; Spain	4:08.72	Sonja Roman; Slovenia	4:11.42	Roisin McGettigan; Ireland	4:11.58
3000 m	Alemitu Bekele; Turkey	8:46.50; NR PB	Sara Moreira; Portugal	8:48.18; PB	Mary Cullen; Ireland	8:48.47
60 m hurdles	Eline Berings; Belgium	7.92; NR EL	Lucie Škrobáková; Czech Republic	7.94; NR	Derval O'Rourke; Ireland	7.97; SB
4 × 400 m relay	Russia; Natalya Antyukh; Darya Safonova; Yelena Voynova; Antonina Krivoshapka	3:29.12	Great Britain; Donna Fraser; Kim Wall; Vicki Barr; Marilyn Okoro	3:30.42	Belarus; Alena Kievich; Katsiaryna Bobryk; Hanna Tashpulatava; Katsiaryna Mishyna	3:35.03
WR world record | ER European record | CR championship record | NR national record | WL world leading | EL European leading | PB personal best | SB seasonal best

=== Field ===
Event	Gold		Silver		Bronze	
High jump	Ariane Friedrich; Germany	2.01	Ruth Beitia; Spain	1.99	Viktoriya Klyugina; Russia	1.96
Pole vault	Yuliya Golubchikova; Russia	4.75 =PB	Silke Spiegelburg; Germany	4.75; NR PB	Anna Battke; Germany	4.65; PB
Long jump	Ksenija Balta; Estonia	6.87; WL NR PB EL	Yelena Sokolova; Russia	6.84; PB	Olga Kucherenko; Russia	6.82
Triple jump	Anastasiya Taranova-Potapova; Russia	14.68; WL PB	Marija Šestak; Slovenia	14.60; SB	Dana Veldáková; Slovakia	14.40; NR PB
Shot put	Petra Lammert; Germany	19.66; WL PB	Denise Hinrichs; Germany	19.63; PB	Anca Heltne; Romania	18.71
WR world record | ER European record | CR championship record | NR national record | WL world leading | EL European leading | PB personal best | SB seasonal best

=== Combined ===
Event	Gold		Silver		Bronze	
Pentathlon	Anna Bogdanova; Russia	4761	Jolanda Keizer; Netherlands	4644; PB	Antoinette Nana Djimou Ida; France	4618; PB
WR world record | ER European record | CR championship record | NR national record | WL world leading | EL European leading | PB personal best | SB seasonal best

== Medal table ==
Rank	Nation	Gold	Silver	Bronze	Total
1	Russia	9	4	4	17
2	Germany	3	3	4	10
3	France	2	2	2	6
3	Italy	2	2	2	6
5	Great Britain	2	2	0	4
6	Estonia	2	0	0	2
7	Spain	1	3	1	5
8	Portugal	1	1	0	2
9	Poland	1	0	2	3
10	Sweden	1	0	1	2
11	Belgium	1	0	0	1
11	Turkey	1	0	0	1
13	Ukraine	0	3	0	3
14	Netherlands	0	2	0	2
14	Slovenia	0	2	0	2
16	Czech Republic	0	1	2	3
17	Cyprus	0	1	0	1
17	Norway	0	1	0	1
19	Ireland	0	0	3	3
20	Romania	0	0	2	2
21	Belarus	0	0	1	1
21	Slovakia	0	0	1	1
Totals (22 entries)		26	27	25	78

== Participating nations ==
- Albania (3)
- Armenia (2)
- Austria (7)
- Azerbaijan (1)
- Belarus (13)
- Belgium (6)
- Bosnia and Herzegovina (2)
- Bulgaria (7)
- Croatia (3)
- Cyprus (5)
- Czech Republic (14)
- Denmark (13)
- Estonia (13)
- Finland (13)
- France (36)
- Georgia (1)
- Germany (36)
- Gibraltar (1)
- Great Britain (29)
- Greece (7)
- Hungary (7)
- Ireland (16)
- Israel (6)
- Italy (34)
- Latvia (5)
- Lithuania (10)
- Macedonia (1)
- Malta (1)
- Moldova (1)
- Monaco (1)
- Netherlands (14)
- Norway (6)
- Poland (21)
- Portugal (12)
- Romania (17)
- Russia (57)
- San Marino (2)
- Serbia (5)
- Slovakia (11)
- Slovenia (6)
- Spain (36)
- Sweden (13)
- Switzerland (4)
- Turkey (12)
- Ukraine (20)
