= Shannon Rowbury =

American middle-distance runner

Shannon Rowbury OLY
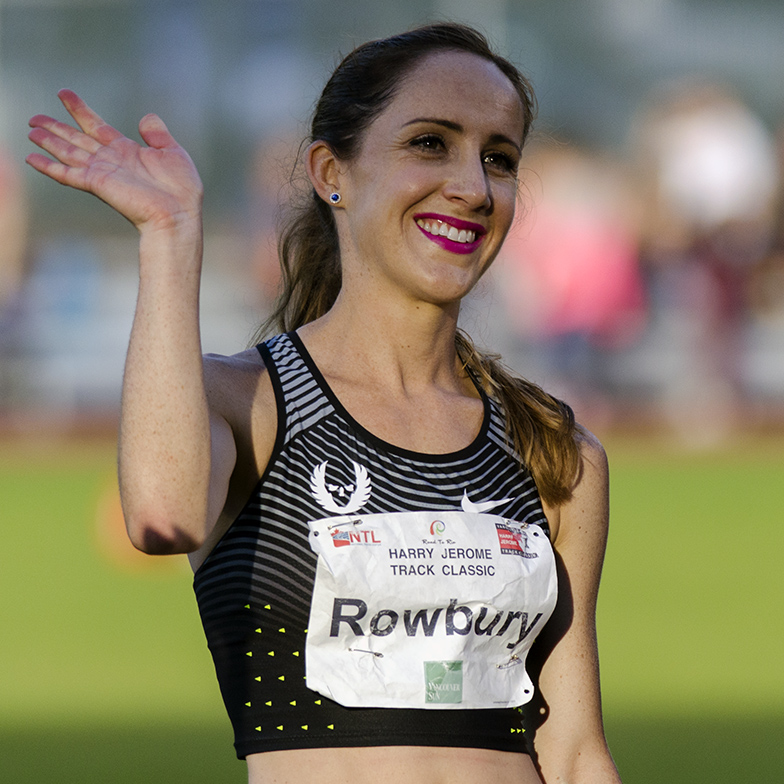
- Rowbury in 2016

Personal information
- Nationality: American
- Born: September 19, 1984 (age 42) San Francisco, California, U.S.
- Height: 5 ft 5 in (1.65 m)
- Spouse: Pablo Solares
- Children: 1

Sport
- Sport: Track
- Events: 800 meters, 1500 meters, 5000 meters
- College team: Duke Blue Devils
- Coached by: Pete Julian

Achievements and titles
- Olympic finals: 2008 Beijing; 1500 m, 7th; 2012 London; 1500 m, Bronze (not yet reallocated); 2016 Rio de Janeiro; 1500 m, 4th
- World finals: 2009 Berlin; 1500 m, Bronze; 2011 Daegu; 1500 m, 20th (sf); 2013 Moscow; 5000 m, 7th; 2015 Beijing; 1500 m, 7th; 2017 London; 5000 m, 9th
- Personal bests: 800 m: 1:59.97 (Eugene 2016); 1500 m: 3:56.29 (Monaco 2015); Mile: 4:20.34 (Rieti 2008); 3000 m: 8:29.93 (Brussels 2014); 5000 m: 14:38.92 (Brussels 2016)
Medal record
Olympic Games
Bronze medal – third place	2012 London	1500 m
World Championships
Bronze medal – third place	2009 Berlin	1500 m
World Indoor Championships
Bronze medal – third place	2016 Portland	3000 m
World Relay Championships
Gold medal – first place	2015 Nassau	Distance medley relay
Continental Cup
Silver medal – second place	2014 Marrakech	1500 m
Bronze medal – third place	2010 Split	3000 m

Shannon Solares-Rowbury (born Shannon Rowbury, September 19, 1984) is an American middle-distance runner from San Francisco, California. After competing collegiately for Duke University, she turned professional in 2007. Rowbury has represented the United States at the 2008, 2012, and 2016 Summer Olympics, winning a bronze medal in 2012, becoming the first American woman to win an Olympic medal in the event. She also represented the United States at the World Championships in 2009, 2011, 2013, 2015, and 2017, winning the bronze medal in the 1500 meters in 2009. In 2015, Rowbury helped set the world record with the U.S. team for the distance medley relay event, and set a then-American record for 1500 meters on July 17, 2015, breaking Mary Slaney's 32 year-old mark with a time of 3:56.29.

== Personal life ==
Rowbury was born in San Francisco, California. She grew up in the Parkside section of the Sunset District neighborhood in San Francisco. In 2002, Rowbury graduated from Sacred Heart Cathedral Preparatory High School in San Francisco. Rowbury attended Duke University and studied English and Theater and competed on the cross country and track and field teams for the school. In 2007, Rowbury graduated from Duke magna cum laude in English and Theater Studies with a certificate in Film/Video/Digital Studies. She completed her master's degree at Duke in May 2008, with an emphasis on Film and Women's Studies. In April 2007, Rowbury was diagnosed with a femoral neck stress fracture (hip joint), which abruptly put an end to her collegiate career at Duke University.

Rowbury married Mexican-American runner Pablo Solares on April 11, 2015. She gave birth to their daughter on June 30, 2018.

== Running career ==
=== Collegiate ===
Rowbury set a school record for the mile in the indoor track season as a freshman at Duke. In her sophomore year she earned indoor All-American status, finishing in 8th place at the NCAA championships in the mile. In her junior year season she anchored Duke's first victorious distance medley relay team. As a senior, she helped Duke place third at the NCAA cross country championships. She redshirted her indoor and outdoor seasons of her senior year, but set Duke school records in the 800m, 1500m, 3000m, 5000m and steeplechase, the latter at 9.59.4.

=== 2007 ===
Rowbury signed with Nike in June 2007. Her first six months of training under John Cook involved rehabilitation from her stress fracture. In November 2007, Rowbury competed at the Seagate Elite 5K Road Race in San Jose, California to assess her current fitness level coming back from her injury. She managed a second-place finish, with a time of 15:54.

=== 2008 ===
In January 2008, Rowbury enjoyed her first extended stint at altitude in central Mexico where she trained for six weeks with her coach and teammates. She returned to the United States in February to compete in the USA Indoor Track and Field Championships, her first track race since her injury 11 months earlier. Rowbury went on to win the 3000 m in a personal best time of 8:55.19. In April 2008, Rowbury opened up her outdoor track campaign at the Duke Invitational, winning the 800 m by 12 seconds with a two-second personal best time of 2:02.76.

Her next race was in early May at the Payton Jordon Invitational at Stanford University where she hoped to achieve the Olympic A standard at 1500 m (4:07.00). Although Rowbury came up short of her goal while racing at Stanford, she did manage a five-second personal best at this distance with a time of 4:07.59.

Still seeking the Olympic A standard, Rowbury raced at the Adidas Track Classic in Carson, California on May 18, 2008. In the 1500 m, she won with a time of 4:01.61, improving another six seconds over her previous personal best. This performance placed Rowbury 5th all-time at 1500 m for United States females. In addition, her effort would have placed her 9th in the world rankings based on the 2007 IAAF world performance list. This performance gave her the Olympic A standard that she needed heading into the USATF Olympic Trials.

On July 6, 2008, at the USATF Olympic Trials in Eugene, Oregon, Rowbury placed first in the 1500 m final with a time of 4:05.48, followed by Erin Donohue and Christin Wurth-Thomas. The three qualified to compete at the 2008 Beijing Olympics based on their performance at the trials.

Rowbury had the fourth-fastest time in the first-round heats of the women's 1500 m run in Beijing, qualifying for the finals. She was the only American athlete to advance to the finals, where she placed seventh with a time of 4:03.58. Her seventh-place finish was (as of then) the best finish ever by an American woman in the 1500 meters at the modern Olympics.

=== 2009 ===
Rowbury retained her 1500 m title at the 2009 US Championships, beating Christin Wurth-Thomas and qualifying for the 2009 World Championships in Athletics. At the 2009 World Championships, in Berlin, Rowbury captured the bronze medal in a time of 4:04.18. A month later she won her first Fifth Avenue Mile, narrowly edging out Lisa Dobriskey, Sara Hall and Wurth-Thomas.

=== 2010 ===
In 2010, Rowbury finished second in the 1500 meters at the US Indoor Championships, and third at the US Championships outdoors. On July 22, 2010, Rowbury improved her personal best in the 3000 m by 23 seconds with a time of 8:31.38, which was the third-best mark in U.S. history.

Rowbury won the 2010 edition of the Fifth Avenue Mile on September 26, 2010.

=== 2011 ===
In 2011, Rowbury finished third at the US Championships, qualifying her for the IAAF World Championships in Daegu, South Korea. There, she qualified for the semifinals, but was eliminated from the competition in the semi-final race.

=== 2012 ===
Rowbury finished second at the U.S. Olympic track and field trials, qualifying her for her second consecutive Olympics. Morgan Uceny, who finished first at the trials, and Jenny Simpson, who finished third, also competed with Rowbury at the London Olympics. Rowbury initially finished sixth in the 1500 meters race at the 2012 Summer Olympics in London. At the time, her sixth-place finish was the best finish ever by an American woman in the 1500 meters at the modern Olympics. Currently in fourth position following the disqualifications of Aslı Çakır Alptekin and Gamze Bulut for doping, she stands to be upgraded to the bronze medal after Tatyana Tomashova of Russia was disqualified for doping in September 2024. Six of the top nine finishers in the event (not including Rowbury) have been either disqualified or linked to performance-enhancing drug use, with ESPN labeling it "one of the dirtiest [races] in Olympic history".

=== 2013 ===
Rowbury began her season at the Drake Relays, finishing fourth in the 1500m with a time of 4:09.05. After finishing fourth in the 1500 meters at the USATF Championships in June 2013 in a slow, tactical final, Rowbury was left off the World Championships team in the 1500 metres, her main event. She later finished third in the 5000 meters at the USATF Championships, qualifying her for her third consecutive World Championship team. Because Treniere Moser, who was on the World Championships team for the 1500 meters, pulled out due to a hamstring injury, Rowbury could have run the 1500 meters, but was forced to run the 5000 meters due to a technicality. Rowbury finished 7th in the 5000 meters in Moscow, just behind her compatriot Molly Huddle. After the 2013 season, Rowbury's coach, John Cook, retired, and she switched coaches to Alberto Salazar, becoming a member of the Nike Oregon Project.

=== 2014 ===
Rowbury began her season at the University of Washington Indoor Preview, finishing fourth in the 800 meters with a time of 2:07.72 on January 18, 2014. She was the runner-up in the 3000 meters in 9:25.49 at 2014 USA Indoor Track and Field Championships on February 22, 2014.

On June 27, 2014, Rowbury finished second in the 5,000 meters US outdoor title in Sacramento, California with a time of 15:01.71, being passed by Molly Huddle in the final meters, who won in 15:01.56.

After many years of trying Rowbury broke the four-minute barrier for the first time in the 1500m at the prestigious Paris Diamond League meeting on July 5. She recorded a time of 3:59.49 seconds. Just two weeks later at the Monaco Diamond League meeting she recorded a new lifetime best in the 5000m finishing behind American Record holder Molly Huddle in the race. Her time of 14:48.68 saw her go under the 15 minute barrier for the first time and slice 12 seconds off her previous personal best. She became the fourth-fastest American women ever over the distance.

=== 2015 ===
Rowbury, still training under Alberto Salazar, raced in five indoor races with her capstone performances earning gold medals in a 4:34.40 mile and 9:43.94 two-mile at USA Indoor Track and Field Championships.

UW Indoor Preview, Seattle, WA
Date	Distance	Place	Time
January 17, 2015	Mile	1st	4:27.86
January 17, 2015	1000m	1st	2:40.25

Rowbury won the Millrose Games women's Wanamaker mile in 4:24.32.

Rowbury was runner up in the 1500 m in 4:14.99 in 2015 USA Outdoor Track and Field Championships.

On July 17, 2015, Rowbury broke the American record in the 1500 m at the Diamond League competition in Monaco, with a time of 3:56.29.

Rowbury made it to the final in the 2015 World Championships in Athletics – Women's 1500 metres, leading on a slow first 800m, and finishing 7th in 4:12.39.

On September 11, at the Diamond League finale in Brussels, Rowbury placed 3rd in the mile in 4:22.10, just ahead of Jennifer Simpson who finished in 4:22.18.

On September 13, Rowbury placed 2nd in a time of 4:29.3 at the New York Road Runners Fifth Avenue Mile in New York City, just behind Simpson at 4:29.0.

=== 2016 ===
On February 20, 2016, Rowbury won the Millrose Games women's Wanamaker Mile for the second year in a row, finishing in 4:24.39

On March 12, Rowbury won the 3000 meters in 8:55.65 at the 2016 USA Indoor Track and Field Championships. She won the bronze medal at the IAAF World Indoor Championships behind Genzebe Dibaba and Meseret Defar in the same event.

After finishing second at the US Olympic Trials, Rowbury went on to finish 4th in the 1500m final at the 2016 Summer Olympics in Rio, behind her compatriot Jenny Simpson. Prior to the event, Rowbury criticized the participation of her competitor Castor Semenya in women's events.

On August 27, 2016, Rowbury finished 4th in the 1500 meters in Stade de France, Paris, in 3:58.00. On September 1 in the Diamond League 1500m final in Zurich, Rowbury outleaned Laura Muir, running a season's best time of 3:57.78. This was Rowbury's first ever 1500m victory in a Diamond League meeting. On September 9, Rowbury finished 5th in the 5000m in the Brussels Diamond League, breaking Molly Huddle's U.S. 5000m record, finishing in a time of 14:38.92.

=== 2017 ===
On April 2, 2017, Rowbury was second in the road 5k Carlsbad 5000 finishing in 15:36, 1 second behind Viola Lagat.

=== 2020 ===
Rowbury was training for the 2020 U.S. Olympic track and field trials and aiming to make her fourth Olympic team. She suffered a stress fracture after the trials were rescheduled to 2021 as a result of the COVID-19 pandemic, and did not enter the trials as a result.

== Competition record ==
Year	Competition	Venue	Position	Event	Notes
Representing the United States
2008	Olympic Games	Beijing, China	7th	1500 m	4:03.58
2009	World Championships	Berlin, Germany	3rd	1500 m	4:04.18
2011	World Championships	South Korea	20th (sf)	1500 m	4:11.49
2012	Olympic Games	London, England	3rd	1500 m	4:11.26
2013	World Championships	Moscow, Russia	7th	5000 m	15:06.10
2015	World Championships	Beijing, China	7th	1500 m	4:12.16
2016	World Indoor Championships	Portland, Oregon	3rd	3000 m	8:55.55
2016	Olympic Games	Rio de Janeiro, Brazil	4th	1500 m	4:11.05
2017	World Championships	London, United Kingdom	9th	5000 m	14:59.92

=== USA National Championships ===
==== Outdoor track and field ====
Year	Competition	Venue	Position	Event	Notes
2008	US Olympic Trials	Eugene, Oregon	1st	1500 m	4:05.48
2009	USA Outdoor Track and Field Championships	Eugene, Oregon	1st	1500 m	4:05.07
2010	USA Outdoor Track and Field Championships	Eugene, Oregon	3rd	1500 m	4:14.41
2011	USA Outdoor Track and Field Championships	Eugene, Oregon	3rd	1500 m	4:06.20
2012	US Olympic Trials	Eugene, Oregon	2nd	1500 m	4:05.11
2013	USA Outdoor Track and Field Championships	Des Moines, Iowa	4th	1500 m	4:30.09
2013	USA Outdoor Track and Field Championships	Des Moines, Iowa	3rd	5000 m	15:37.27
2014	USA Outdoor Track and Field Championships	Eugene, Oregon	2nd	5000 m	15:01.71
2015	USA Outdoor Track and Field Championships	Eugene, Oregon	2nd	1500 m	4:14.99
2016	US Olympic Trials	Eugene, Oregon	2nd	1500 m	4:05.39
2017	USA Outdoor Track and Field Championships	Sacramento, California	2nd	5000 m	15:14.08
2017	USA Outdoor Track and Field Championships	Sacramento, California	8th	1500 m	4:10.36

==== Indoor track and field ====
Year	Competition	Venue	Position	Event	Notes
2008	USA Indoor Track and Field Championships	Boston, Massachusetts	1st	3000 m	8:55.19
2010	USA Indoor Track and Field Championships	Albuquerque, New Mexico	3rd	3000 m	9:15.92
2010	USA Indoor Track and Field Championships	Albuquerque, New Mexico	2nd	1500 m	4:19.38
2014	USA Indoor Track and Field Championships	Albuquerque, New Mexico	2nd	3000 m	9:25.41
2015	USA Indoor Track and Field Championships	Boston, Massachusetts	1st	2 Mile	9:43.94
2015	USA Indoor Track and Field Championships	Boston, Massachusetts	1st	Mile	4:43.40
2016	USA Indoor Track and Field Championships	Portland, Oregon	1st	3000 m	8:55.65
2016	World Indoor Track and Field Championships	Portland, Oregon	3rd	3000 m	8:55.55

== Personal bests ==
Event	Time	Venue	Date	Notes
Outdoor
800 m	1:59.97	Eugene	July 29, 2016	
1500 m	3:56.29	Monaco	July 17, 2015	American record until October 5, 2019; broken by Shelby Houlihan (3:54.99)
Mile run	4:20.34	Rieti	September 7, 2008	
3000 m	8:29.93	Brussels	September 5, 2014	
Two miles	9:20.25	Eugene, Oregon	May 31, 2014	American record until April 27, 2018; broken by Jenny Simpson (9:16.78)
5000 m	14:38.92	Brussels	September 9, 2016	American record until July 21, 2018; broken by Shelby Houlihan (14:34.45)
Indoor
1500 m	4:05.08	New York, NY	February 14, 2015	
Mile run	4:22.66	Winston-Salem, NC	January 31, 2015	Flat Track Record
3000 m	8:41.94	Boston	January 28, 2017	
Two miles	9:43.94	Boston	March 1, 2015	
