= Morgan Uceny =

American middle-distance runner

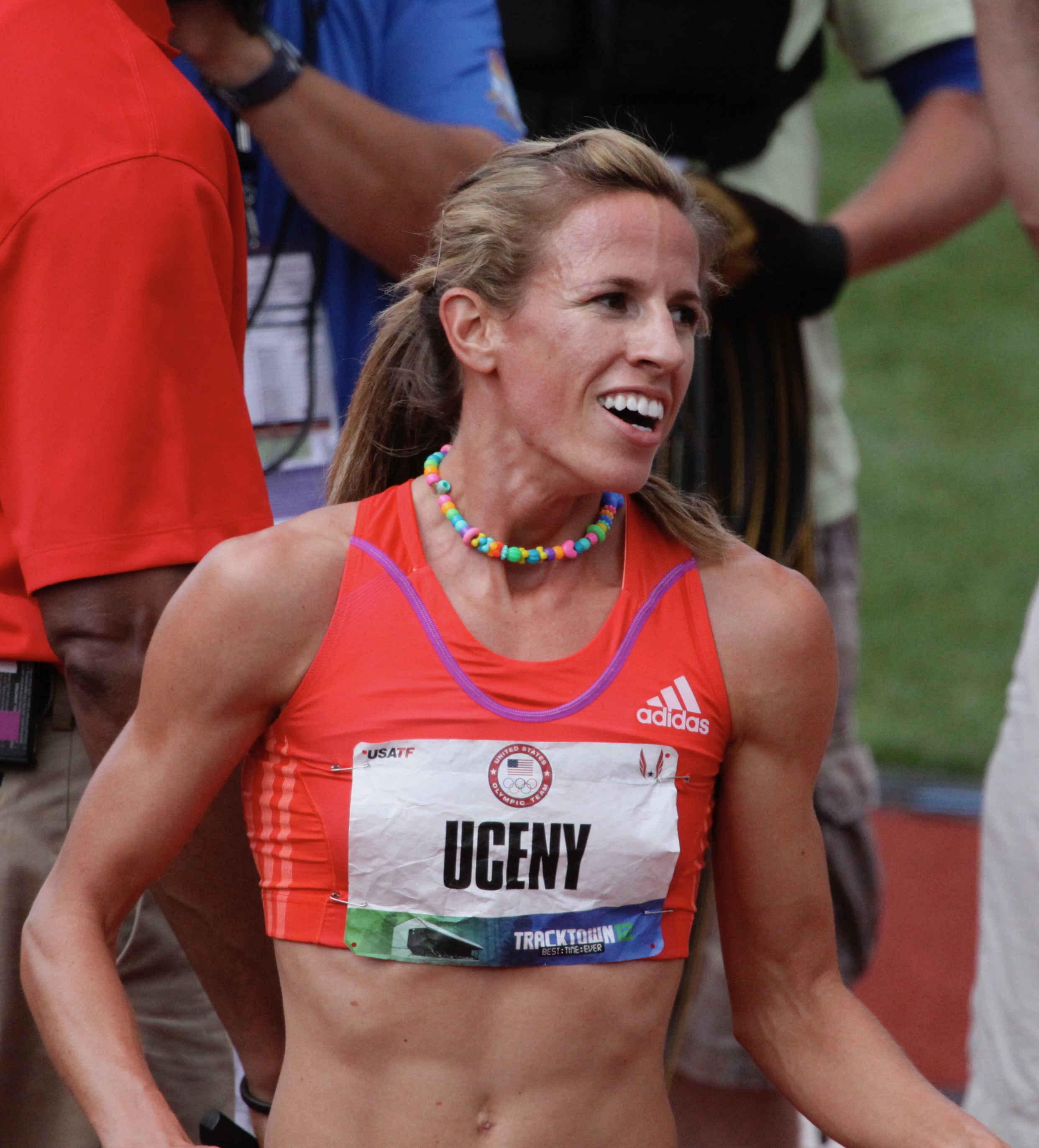
- Uceny at the 2012 US Olympic Trials

Personal information
- Born: March 10, 1985 (age 41) Plymouth, Indiana
- Height: 5 ft 6 in (1.68 m)
- Weight: 115 lb (52 kg)

Sport
- Country: United States
- Event: 1500 m
- College team: Cornell Big Red
- Club: adidas
- Turned pro: 2007
- Coached by: Terrence Mahon
- Retired: 2016

Achievements and titles
- World finals: 2011 1500m (10th place)
- Personal bests: (800 m) 1:58.37 (1500m) 4:00.06 (Mile) 4:24.6

Morgan Uceny (born March 10, 1985) is a retired American track and field athlete who specialized in middle distance running. Uceny won three national championships and was the 2011 IAAF Diamond League Champion at 1500 meters. She ended 2011 as the first American since 1985 to be ranked number one in the world in the 1500 m by Track & Field News.

She represented her country at the 2012 Summer Olympics, 2007 Pan American Games, and the 2011 World Championships in Athletics. Her personal records are 1:58.37 minutes for the 800 meters and 4:00.06 minutes for the 1500 meters.

== Personal life ==
Uceny was born on 10 March 1985 in Plymouth, Indiana, with her father, Marty, her mother, Brenda, and her two older brothers Alex and Matt. She is of Czech descent through her great-grandfather. As a child, she loved basketball and aspired to play in the WNBA. She graduated from Plymouth High School.

== Career ==
=== Pre-professional career ===
While at Plymouth High School, Uceny both ran track and played basketball. She ran cross country during her freshman and sophomore years, but decided to quit and focus on basketball and track. She won the state 800 meter championship her junior year.

Uceny attended Cornell University and graduated in 2007 as a Four-Time All-American for Indoor 800m (2006, 2007) & Outdoor 800m (2005, 2007).

=== Professional career ===
Uceny won a bronze medal over 800 m at the 2008 USA Indoor Track and Field Championships and was the winner in the mile at the 2010 indoor nationals.

In the 2011 season she won the 1500 m at the Brussels Diamond League, out-sprinting a loaded field and setting the world leading time of 4:00.06, with a closing 400m of 61 seconds. At the 2011 IAAF World Championships in Daegu, she was tripped by Kenyan runner Hellen Obiri who had fallen, and ended up placing 10th in the final, well out of medal contention. Despite the result, Uceny finished the 2011 season ranked No.1 in the world.

Uceny won the national titles in the 1500 m at the 2012 US track and field Olympic Trials, qualifying for her first Olympics, alongside Shannon Rowbury, and Jenny Simpson. At the London Games, Uceny and Rowbury made it to the final, but a mid-race clash with Ekaterina Kostetskaya meant she fell hard onto the track as the pack moved on, injuring her back and right side. She did not finish the race and left the stadium in tears.

Uceny once again made the 1500 m final at the 2014 USA Championships, but was clipped around halfway through the race and fell. Uceny ran 4:04.76 in the 1500 metres at the Paris Diamond League to redeem herself and this was her fastest time since 2012 summer.

Uceny ran a 4:11.18 1500 m en route to 4:29.39 mile at Fort Washington Avenue Armory. Uceny ran a season best 4:09.31 1500 m at June 2015 Sainsbury's Birmingham Grand Prix. At US championship 1500 m, Uceny finished 21st. Uceny ran a season best 4:34.02 mile at Sir Walter Miler hosted by Meredith College.

Uceny ran 4:09.21 1500 m at NYRR Millrose Games. Uceny ran 2:02.00 near Boston, Massachusetts, 4:03.94 for 1500 at Furman University elite women race, placed 5th at the 1500 m final at 2016 US Olympic Trials (track and field) and placed 10th in 4:24.6 at 2016 Fifth Avenue Mile.

Uceny announced her retirement from professional track and field on 14 December 2016. In March 2017, Morgan married professional rock climber Shane Messer.

== International competitions ==
Representing the United States
Year	Competition	Venue	Position	Event	Notes
2007	Pan American Games	Rio de Janeiro, Brazil	11th (h)	800 m	2:04.13
2011	World Championships	Daegu, South Korea	10th	1500 m	4:19.71
2012	Olympic Games	London, United Kingdom	DNF	1500 m	DNF

== National championships ==
US Championships
Year	Distance	Time	Place	Ref.
2007	800 meters	2:01.75	4th	
2008 indoor	800 meters	2:04.12	3rd	
2008	800 meters	2:02.16	6th	
2009	800 meters	2:01.32	6th	
2010 indoor	1500 meters	4:19.46	1st	
2010	800 meters	2:00.86	5th	
2011	1500 meters	4:03.91	1st	
2012	1500 meters	4:04.59	1st	
2013	1500 meters	4:31.32	8th	
2014 indoor	1500 meters	4:20.49	8th	
2014	1500 meters	4:24.01	12th	
2015 indoor	1 mile	4:38.13	7th	
2015	1500 meters	4:21.20	21st	
2016	1500 meters	4:06.94	5th	
