= Athletics at the 2012 Summer Olympics – Women's 1500 metres =

Women's 1500 metres at the Games of the XXX Olympiad
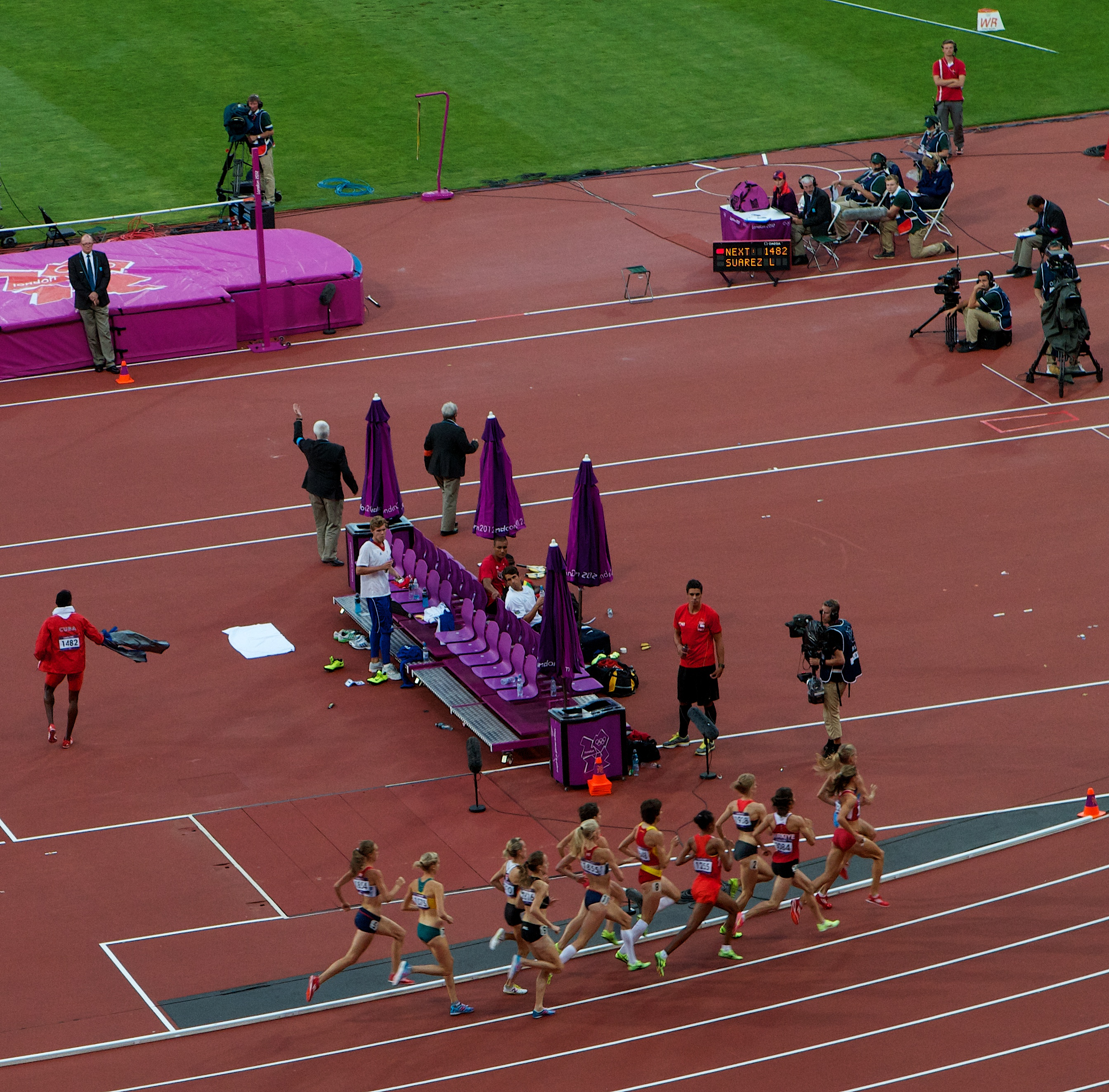
- Venue: Olympic Stadium
- Date: 6–10 August 2012
- Competitors: 46 from 26 nations
- Winning time: 4:10.23

Medalists
1st place, gold medalist(s)		Maryam Yusuf Jamal	Bahrain
2nd place, silver medalist(s)		Abeba Aregawi	Ethiopia
3rd place, bronze medalist(s)		Shannon Rowbury	United States

Official video

The women's 1500 metres competition was an event at the 2012 Summer Olympics in London, United Kingdom. The competition was held at the Olympic Stadium from 6 to 10 August 2012. In the years following the final, the result would be changed several times due to multiple disqualifications for doping.

Subsequent testing showed six of the first nine finishers were linked to performance-enhancing drug usage. The initial top two finishers, Aslı Çakır Alptekin and Gamze Bulut, both of Turkiye, were later found to have used prohibited drugs during this period and were disqualified, and the runner subsequently raised to the silver medal position, Tatyana Tomashova, had served a two-year doping ban (2008–2010) for manipulating samples and was banned after the Olympics for failing another drug test. In 2024, she was stripped of her reallocated silver medal in this event and her record was disqualified. 7th-place finisher Natallia Kareiva and 9th-place finisher Yekaterina Kostetskaya were disqualified after also being found guilty of doping. As of early September 2024, five of the initial twelve finishers had been disqualified for doping violations. (Abeba Aregawi had a doping violation in 2016 but was absolved of a ban.) In June 2025, the IOC Executive Board officially reallocated the medals to the runners who initially finished in third, fifth, and sixth places.

In 2016, the British daily newspaper The Independent called the race the dirtiest in history, with the BBC echoing this view.

== Summary ==
The qualifying rounds were strategic, with the second heat significantly slower than the first and third. World championship bronze medalist (and 2009 first finisher) Natalia Rodríguez and Genzebe Dibaba both failed to qualify.

The semifinals were similarly inconsistent. In the first semi, the race was stringing out behind a last lap charge by Ethiopian-born Bahraini Mimi Belete chased by Aslı Çakır Alptekin, the two leaders looking to be sure qualifiers. At the head of the final straight Alptekin passed Belete for the lead and Belete wilted, falling back through the field and changing the dynamic of the rush for qualifying positions, giving Shannon Rowbury a qualifying spot, while Hilary Stellingwerff and Corinna Harrer had to hope the second semi would go slowly. Instead, it was significantly faster with Tatyana Tomashova pushing the pace after the first 200 metres. With 600m to go, Gamze Bulut passed Tomashova to accelerate the pace further. Abeba Aregawi stayed on Bulut's shoulder and sprinted past with 200 to go, stringing out the field, leaving reigning world champion Jennifer Simpson behind.

The final started out slowly. Bulut and Maryam Yusuf Jamal found themselves in the lead, Jamal noticeably looking around for someone else to take the pace. The first lap was 1:15.12, while the second lap was a few seconds faster, reached in 2:23.97. The two shared the leading duties until the bell, then both accelerated, with the field swarming to join them. Moments after the bell, Aregawi passed behind Morgan Uceny, who stumbled, her knee meeting the back-kick of Yekaterina Kostetskaya. Just like her experience in the 2011 World Championships, Uceny found herself on the ground as the field was sprinting away from her, leaving her in tears. Alptekin passed Bulut with 300 to go. Aregawi joined the lead group on the back stretch with Jamal and Bulut all jockeying for position behind Alptekin. Coming onto the home stretch Jamal looked like she was in position to move past Alptekin, but she never gained enough. Aregawi edged past Jamal with Bulut trying to close the gap. 20 metres before the finish Aregawi suddenly slowed as she was passed by Jamal at the same time as Bulut passed them both.

== Doping and aftermath ==
Suspicions about the race's legitimacy with regard to doping quickly emerged. Great Britain's Lisa Dobriskey, who finished 10th, told BBC Radio 5 Live immediately after the race, "I don't believe I'm competing on a level playing field." While refusing to accuse any specific athlete of performance-enhancing drugs use, Dobriskey said that "I think people will be caught eventually ... Fingers crossed." Dobriskey faced criticisms for her comments, but was later considered vindicated by subsequent events.

In May 2013, several news organizations reported that winner Aslı Çakır Alptekin had tested positive for a banned substance. As her second doping offense, she would face a lifetime ban if found guilty and be stripped of her gold medal. Neither the IAAF nor WADA made an official confirmation of the positive drug test. On 28 July 2014, IAAF announced that 9th-place finisher Yekaterina Kostetskaya was sanctioned for doping after her biological passport had shown abnormalities. Her result was disqualified.

On 17 August 2015, the Court of Arbitration for Sport approved a settlement agreed to by Alptekin and the IAAF. Alptekin agreed to give up her 1500 m Olympic title and serve an eight-year ban for blood doping. There was no confirmation from the IOC whether the medals would be redistributed.

On 1 June 2016, Turkish media reported that Gamze Bulut had also been found to have employed illegal performance enhancing methods by dint of observations of her athlete 'passport'. It was reported that, if confirmed, Bulut would lose her Olympic and European medals, and all medals and records from 2012 to 2016. The IAAF sanctioned her in March 2017 by four year ineligibility and a disqualification since July 2011

In a 2017 story for ESPN, American competitor Shannon Rowbury, who finished sixth, said that she suspected that several of her opponents were using performance-enhancing drugs, but according to the story's writer Doug Williams "felt powerless to challenge other runners, even after the race" and "It's a bit mind-blowing to think that half of the field shouldn't have been there to begin with."

Fourth-place runner Tatyana Tomashova received a two-year ban from 2008 to 2010 for manipulating doping samples and was banned after the Olympics for failing another drug test. In 2016, the IAAF reported that Ethiopian runner Abeba Aregawi, who initially finished the final in fifth place, had failed a recent drug test, although she was reinstated in July based on exculpatory circumstances.

Belarusian runner Natallia Kareiva, who finished seventh in the final, received a two-year ban in 2014 for doping after her biological passport showed abnormalities. This voided her result from the 2012 Olympics.

Russian runner Yekaterina Kostetskaya was also sanctioned for doping in 2014, disqualifying her initial ninth-place finish.

These developments meant that six of the race's top nine finishers were linked to performance-enhancing drug usage. The aforementioned ESPN story called the race "one of the dirtiest in Olympic history".

In 2017, the IOC officially reassigned the gold medal to Maryam Yusuf Jamal, but pending the outcome of anti-doping proceedings against several lower-placed finishers the silver and bronze remained vacant.

In 2018, the IOC reallocated silver and bronze medals, upgrading Tomashova despite her doping suspension. However, in early September 2024, the CAS banned Tomashova for 10 years as a doping penalty following re-testing of her samples and stripped her of the silver medal. That brought the number of initial finishers to be subsequently disqualified for doping violations to five of twelve runners.

In June 2025, the IOC Executive Board officially reallocated medals for the 1500m athletics event, as a result of disqualification of Tomashova, upgrading Abeba Aregawi to silver and Shannon Rowbury to bronze. Rowbury will finally physically receive her medal at the Los Angeles 2028 Summer Olympics - some 16 years after the race.

== Competition format ==
The women's 1500 m competition consisted of heats (round 1), semifinals and a final. The first six competitors in each heat, along with the next six fastest overall, qualified for the semifinals. In the semifinals the first five in each heat along with the next two fastest overall qualified for the final. There was a tie for the 12th fastest overall time and both athletes qualified for the final, making a total of 13 athletes.

== Records ==
Prior to the competition, the existing World and Olympic records were as follows.

Record	Athlete	Time	Location	Date
World record	Qu Yunxia (CHN)	3:50.46	Beijing, China	11 September 1993
Olympic record	Paula Ivan (ROU)	3:53.96	Seoul, South Korea	26 September 1988
2012 World leading	Mariem Alaoui Selsouli (MAR)	3:56.15	Paris, France	6 July 2012

== Schedule ==
All times are British Summer Time (UTC+1)

Date	Time	Round
Monday, 6 August 2012	11:45	Round 1
Wednesday, 8 August 2012	19:45	Semifinals
Friday, 10 August 2012	20:55	Finals

== Results ==
Official video of first round

=== Round 1 ===
The first six of each heat (Q) plus the six fastest times (q) qualified.

==== Heat 1 ====
Rank	Athlete	Nation	Time	Notes
1	Abeba Aregawi	Ethiopia	4:04.55	Q
2	Tatyana Tomashova	Russia	4:05.10	Q
3	Maryam Yusuf Jamal	Bahrain	4:05.39	Q
4	Hellen Obiri	Kenya	4:05.40	Q
5	Hannah England	Great Britain	4:05.73	Q
6	Hilary Stellingwerff	Canada	4:05.79	Q
7	Shannon Rowbury	United States	4:06.03	q
8	Lucy van Dalen	New Zealand	4:07.04	q
9	Lucia Klocova	Slovakia	4:07.79	q, NR
10	Corinna Harrer	Germany	4:07.83	q
11	Marina Munćan	Serbia	4:11.25	
12	Tereza Capkova	Czech Republic	4:12.15	
13	Anzhelika Shevchenko	Ukraine	4:12.97	
14	Natalia Rodríguez	Spain	4:16.18	
15	Tuğba Karakaya	Turkey	4:29.21	
—N/a	Btissam Lakhouad	Morocco	—N/a	DNF

==== Heat 2 ====
Rank	Athlete	Nation	Time	Notes
1	Lisa Dobriskey	Great Britain	4:13.32	Q
2	Siham Hilali	Morocco	4:13.34	Q
—N/a	Aslı Çakır Alptekin	Turkey	~~4:13.64~~	Q
3	Nuria Fernández	Spain	4:13.72	Q
4	Kaila McKnight	Australia	4:13.80	Q
5	Jennifer Simpson	United States	4:13.81	Q
—N/a	Ekaterina Martynova	Russia	~~4:13.86~~	
6	Genzeb Shumi	Bahrain	4:14.02	
7	Meskerem Assefa	Ethiopia	4:15.52	
8	Eunice Sum	Kenya	4:16.95	
9	Sonja Roman	Slovenia	4:19.17	
10	Eliane Saholinirina	Madagascar	4:19.46	
11	Renata Pliś	Poland	4:19.62	
12	Chancel Ilunga Sankuru	Democratic Republic of the Congo	5:05.25	
—N/a	Ingvill Makestad Bovim	Norway	—N/a	DNS

==== Heat 3 ====
Rank	Athlete	Nation	Time	Notes
—N/a	Gamze Bulut	Turkey	~~4:06.69~~	Q
1	Morgan Uceny	United States	4:06.87	Q
—N/a	Natallia Kareiva	Belarus	~~4:06.87~~	Q, SB
—N/a	Yekaterina Kostetskaya	Russia	~~4:06.94~~	Q
2	Mimi Belete	Bahrain	4:07.01	Q, SB
3	Laura Weightman	Great Britain	4:07.29	Q
4	Nicole Sifuentes	Canada	4:07.65	q
5	Zoe Buckman	Australia	4:07.83	q
6	Faith Kipyegon	Kenya	4:08.78	
7	Genzebe Dibaba	Ethiopia	4:11.15	
8	Janet Achola	Uganda	4:11.64	
9	Isabel Macías	Spain	4:13.07	
10	Anna Mishchenko	Ukraine	4:13.63	
11	Betlhem Desalegn	United Arab Emirates	4:14.07	
12	Gladys Landaverde	El Salvador	4:18.26	NR

Official video semifinal round

=== Semifinals ===
The first five of each semifinal (Q) plus the two fastest times (q) qualified.

==== Heat 1 ====
Rank	Athlete	Nation	Time	Notes
—N/a	Aslı Çakır Alptekin	Turkey	~~4:05.11~~	Q
—N/a	Yekaterina Kostetskaya	Russia	~~4:05.32~~	Q
1	Morgan Uceny	United States	4:05.34	Q
2	Lisa Dobriskey	Great Britain	4:05.35	Q
3	Shannon Rowbury	United States	4:05.47	Q
4	Hilary Stellingwerff	Canada	4:05.57	
5	Corinna Harrer	Germany	4:05.70	
6	Mimi Belete	Bahrain	4:05.91	SB
7	Hannah England	Great Britain	4:06.35	
8	Nuria Fernandez	Spain	4:06.57	SB
9	Lucy van Dalen	New Zealand	4:06.97	
10	Kaila McKnight	Australia	4:08.44	

==== Heat 2 ====
Rank	Athlete	Nation	Time	Notes
1	Abeba Aregawi	Ethiopia	4:01.03	Q
—N/a	Gamze Bulut	Turkey	~~4:01.18~~	Q, PB
—N/a	Tatyana Tomashova	Russia	~~4:02.10~~	Q
2	Maryam Yusuf Jamal	Bahrain	4:02.18	Q, SB
3	Hellen Obiri	Kenya	4:02.30	Q
—N/a	Natallia Kareiva	Belarus	~~4:02.37~~	q, ~~PB~~
4	Laura Weightman	Great Britain	4:02.99	q, PB
5	Lucia Klocova	Slovakia	4:02.99	q, NR
7	Siham Hilali	Morocco	4:04.79	
8	Zoe Buckman	Australia	4:05.03	PB
9	Nicole Sifuentes	Canada	4:06.33	
10	Jennifer Simpson	United States	4:06.89	

=== Finals ===
Rank	Athlete	Nation	Time	Notes
1st place, gold medalist(s)	Maryam Yusuf Jamal	Bahrain	4:10.74	
2nd place, silver medalist(s)	Abeba Aregawi	Ethiopia	4:11.03	
3rd place, bronze medalist(s)	Shannon Rowbury	United States	4:11.26	
4	Lucia Klocová	Slovakia	4:12.64	
5	Lisa Dobriskey	Great Britain	4:13.02	
6	Laura Weightman	Great Britain	4:15.60	
7	Hellen Obiri	Kenya	4:16.57	
n/a	Morgan Uceny	United States	n/a	DNF
DSQ	Aslı Çakır Alptekin	Turkey	~~4:10.23~~	DQ (doping)
DSQ	Gamze Bulut	Turkey	~~4:10.40~~	DQ (doping)
DSQ	Tatyana Tomashova	Russia	~~4:10.90~~	DQ (doping)
DSQ	Natallia Kareiva	Belarus	~~4:11.58~~	DQ (doping)
DSQ	Yekaterina Kostetskaya	Russia	~~4:12.90~~	DQ (doping)
