= Sankuru (disambiguation) =

Sankuru may refer to

- Sankuru, one of the provinces of the Democratic Republic of the Congo
- Sankuru District, a former district of the Belgian Congo and the Democratic Republic of the Congo
- Sankuru Nature Reserve, protected area in the Democratic Republic of the Congo established in 2007
- Sankuru River, a major river in the Democratic Republic of the Congo
- Chancel Ilunga Sankuru (born 1995), Congolese middle-distance runner.
