= Fleet Feet =

American retail company

Fleet Feet, Inc.

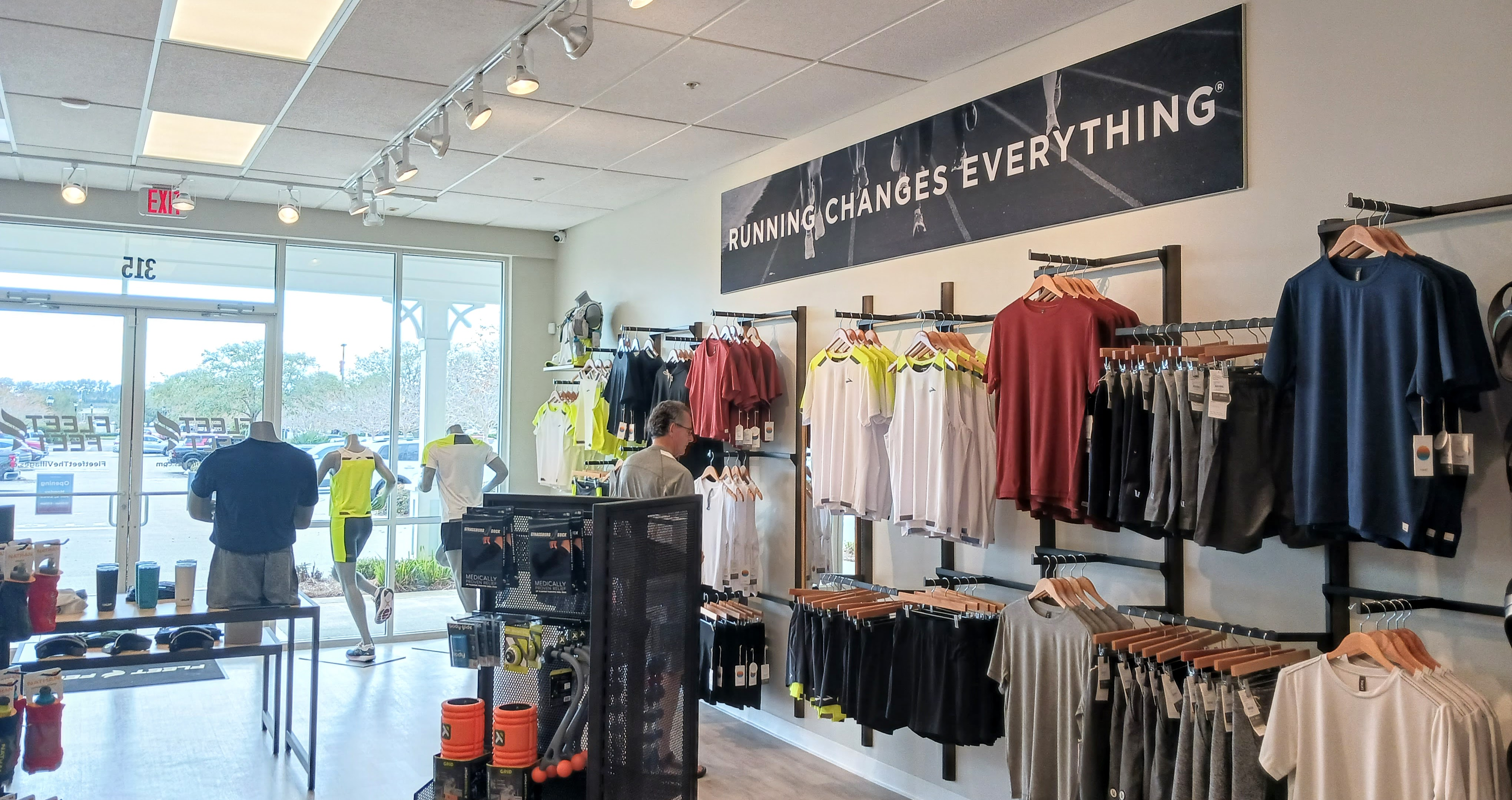
- A Fleet store in The Villages, Florida
- Company type: Private
- Industry: Retail
- Founded: 1976
- Founder: Sally Edwards, Elizabeth Jansen
- Headquarters: Carrboro, North Carolina, U.S.
- Number of locations: 299 - 275 Fleet Feet and 24 Marathon Sports (2025)
- Key people: Joey Pointer (CEO)
- Products: Running shoes, apparel, accessories
- Brands: Fleet Feet; Marathon Sports
- Services: Gait analysis, training programs, community events
- Website: www.fleetfeet.com

Fleet Feet, Inc. is an American franchisor of locally owned and operated retail stores specializing in running shoes, apparel, and accessories. Founded in 1976 in Sacramento, California, by Sally Edwards and Elizabeth Jansen, the company is headquartered in Carrboro, North Carolina. As of 2025, Fleet Feet operates over 280 stores across the United States and maintains an online presence.

== History ==
Fleet Feet was established in 1976 by Sally Edwards and Elizabeth Jansen, both collegiate athletes and educators, who opened their first store in a Victorian house in Sacramento, California. In 1978, a second location opened in Chico, California. Instead of pursuing a multi-store model, Edwards and Jansen opted for franchising, which began in the 1980s.

In 1993, Tom Raynor purchased the company and relocated its headquarters to Carrboro, North Carolina. Under Raynor’s leadership, Fleet Feet expanded its franchise network and introduced services like gait analysis and personalized fitting.

In December 2021, Fleet Feet acquired JackRabbit, the second-largest U.S. running specialty retailer. The acquisition added 57 stores across 15 states and its e-commerce business, creating a network of 250 community-based retail locations. The acquisition included plans to integrate Fleet Feet's fit id 3D foot scanning technology into all JackRabbit stores by Q1 2022 and to transition all branding to Fleet Feet by the end of 2022.

In June 2022, Fleet Feet acquired Marathon Sports, LLC, adding 18 stores across Massachusetts, Connecticut, Rhode Island, and New Hampshire (operating as Marathon Sports and Runner’s Alley). In February 2025, Fleet Feet acquired Flying Feet Sport Shoes in a buyout/leveraged buyout transaction, though it continues to operate under its brand.

In early 2026, Fleet Feet appointed retired three-time Olympian and world champion middle-distance runner Jenny Simpson as its inaugural chief running officer, a new position created following her connections with the company during a just-completed 50-state running tour in a recreational vehicle. As chief running officer, Simpson serves as a national ambassador with responsibilities include optimizing athlete partnerships and shared resources, refining training programs, testing new products and shoe-fitting technologies, and supporting local stores and coaches.

== Operations ==
Fleet Feet stores offer running shoes, apparel, and accessories for men and women, with brands including Nike, Brooks, and Hoka. The company emphasizes a personalized fit process, utilizing 3D foot-scanning technology and gait analysis to recommend products. Many locations provide training programs, group runs, and community events to engage local running communities.

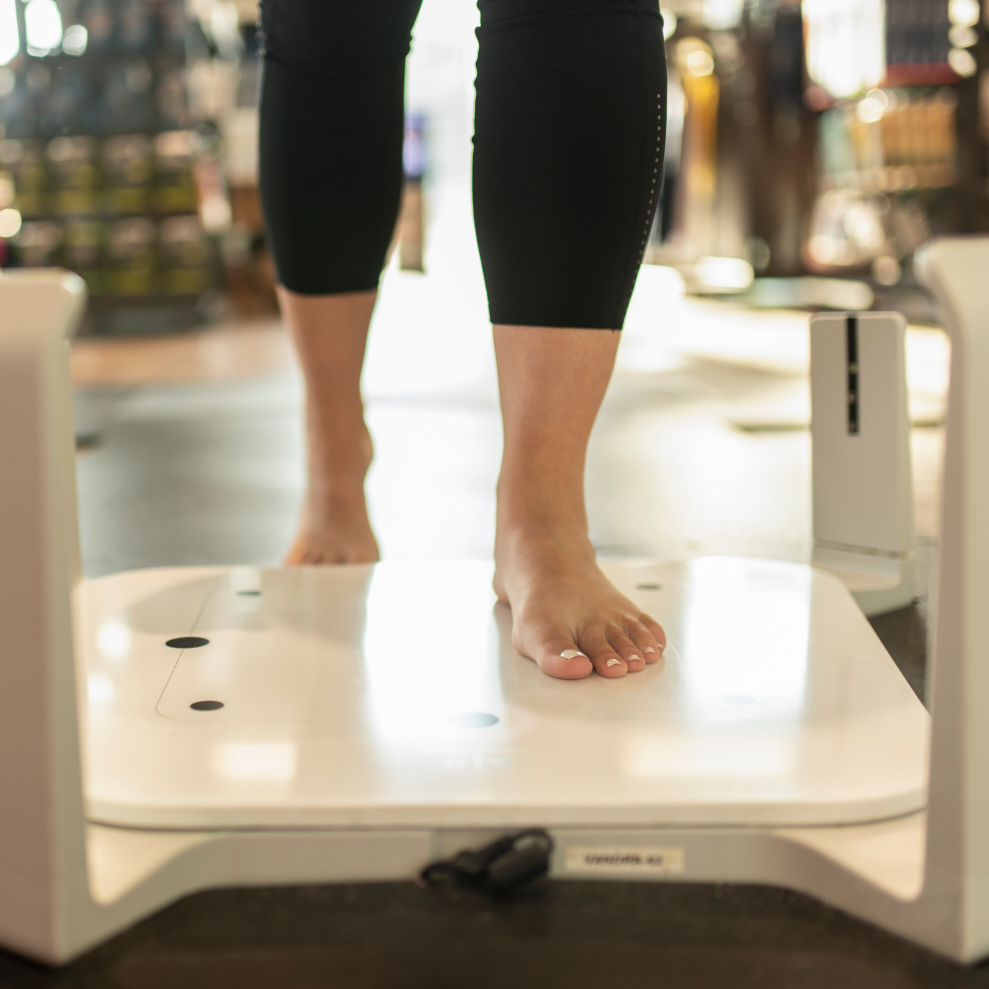
A Fleet Feet fit id scanner, used to capture 3D measurements of a customer's foot, including length, width, volume, and arch height, to assist in shoe fitting.

As of 2025, Fleet Feet operates 280 stores, with franchisees managing individual locations under the company’s brand standards. The company also supports online sales through its website, offering nationwide shipping. The company also has a loyalty program, Fleet Feet Milestones.

== Community engagement ==
Fleet Feet is known for fostering running communities through initiatives like the Fleet Feet Training Program and partnerships with events such as the Bank of Chicago Marathon. Stores often host weekly runs, charity events, and sponsor local races. In 2023, Fleet Feet launched the "Running Changes Everything" campaign to promote inclusivity in running.
