= Lucy Oliver =

New Zealand middle-distance runner

Lucy Oliver (née van Dalen)
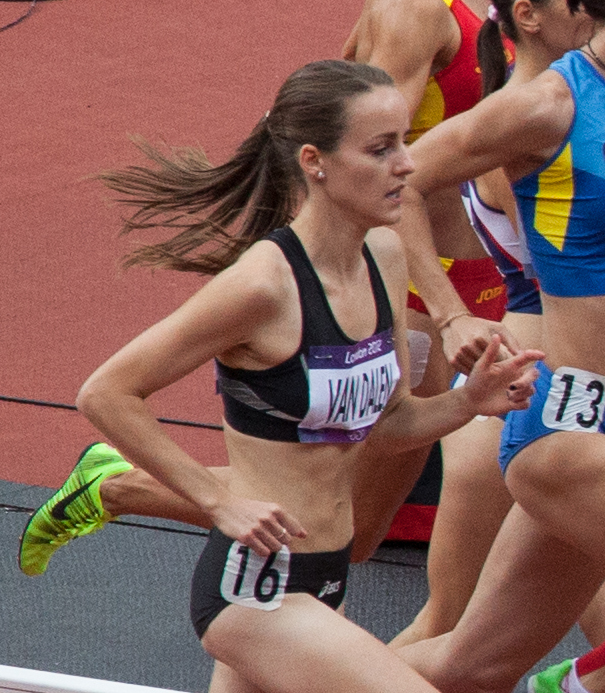
- Lucy Oliver at London 2012

Personal information
- Nationality: New Zealand
- Born: 18 November 1988 (age 37) Wanganui, Manawatū-Whanganui, New Zealand
- Height: 168 cm (5 ft 6 in)
- Weight: 53 kg (117 lb)

Sport
- Sport: Athletics
Medal record
Women's Athletics
Representing New Zealand
Oceania Championships
Gold medal – first place	2006 Apia	1500 m
- Updated on 22 April 2013

Lucy Oliver (née van Dalen; born 18 November 1988 in Wanganui) is a New Zealand middle-distance runner, who competed at the 2012 Summer Olympics, in the Women's 1500 metres. Along with her twin sister Holly, Lucy attended Stony Brook University in New York until 2012, earning an undergraduate degree in sociology followed by a Master of Arts in Liberal Studies (MA/LS). She was chosen an NCAA All-American for outdoor track (2010, 2011 and 2012), indoor track (2011 and 2012) and cross-country (2011). She competed in the 3000 m at the 2014 World Indoor Championships. At the 2014 Commonwealth Games, she competed in the 1500 m and the 5000 m.

At the 2016 Olympics, she competed in the 5000 m.

== Personal bests ==
Outdoor

Event	Time	Date	Location
1500 m	4:05.76	20 June 2012	San Diego, United States
Mile	4:31.78	17 July 2012	Cork, Ireland
3000 m	9:10.67	22 January 2016	Wellington, New Zealand
5000 m	15:20.13	12 June 2016	Portland, United States

Indoor

Event	Time	Date	Location
1000 m	2:42.53	3 February 2012	New Haven, United States
1500 m	4:11.78 NR	11 February 2012	New York, United States
Mile	4:32.61	25 January 2014	New York, United States
2000 m	5:47.62 NR	8 February 2014	Boston, United States
3000 m	8:53:95	15 February 2014	New York, United States

== Achievements ==
Year	Competition	Venue	Position	Event	Notes
Representing New Zealand
2006	Oceania Championships	Apia, Samoa	1st	1500 m	4:40.64
2012	Olympic Games	London, England	11th in semi-final	1500 m	4:06.97
2014	2014 IAAF World Indoor Championships	Sopot, Poland	8th in heat	3000 m	9:10.20
2014	Commonwealth Games	Glasgow, Scotland	13th	5000 m	15:58.43
2016	Olympic Games	Rio de Janeiro, Brazil	14th in heat	5000 m	15:53.77
