= 2016 IAAF World Indoor Championships – Women's 3000 metres =

International women's athletic event

Women's 3000 metres at the 2016 IAAF World Indoor Championships
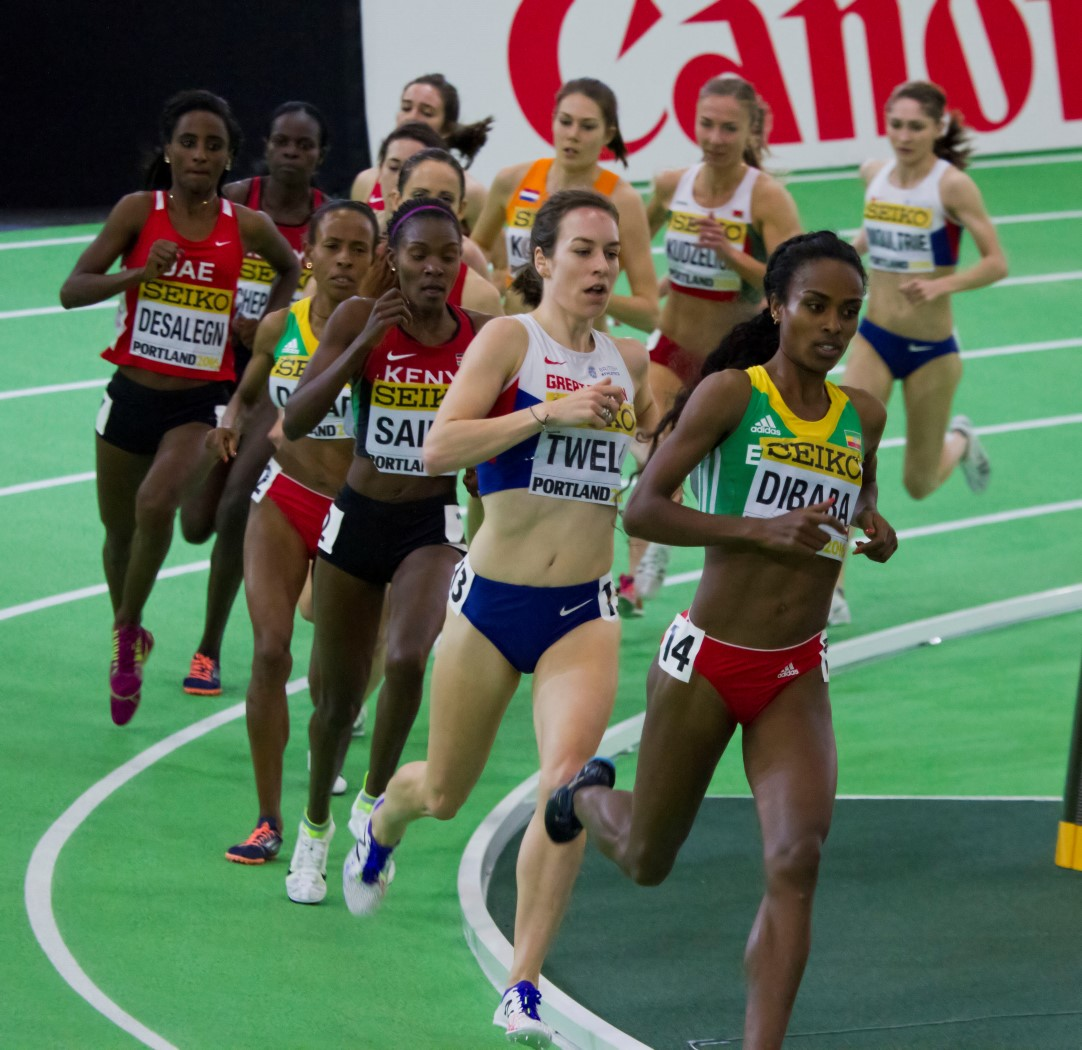
- Venue: Oregon Convention Center
- Dates: March 20
- Competitors: 13 from 9 nations
- Winning time: 8:47.43

Medalists
gold medal	Genzebe Dibaba	Ethiopia
silver medal	Meseret Defar	Ethiopia
bronze medal	Shannon Rowbury	United States

Video on YouTube Official Video

The women's 3000 metres at the 2016 IAAF World Indoor Championships took place on March 20, 2016.

The favorite was obviously world record holder Genzebe Dibaba, but the Outdoor World Championships revealed an achilles heel, a long, drawn out kick. The finals started off at a jog with Stephanie Twell and then Sviatlana Kudzelich on the front controlling the pace. After six laps of this, Dibaba took off, running a 30-second lap and putting a 12-metre gap on the field. From there, Dibaba maintained the gap then increased it at the end as the clear winner. After Twell was the last to try to hold on to Dibaba, Meseret Defar was the last to chase. Too familiar a situation from the past with Defar chasing a Dibaba, but those were Genzebe's older sister Tirunesh. Defar had to take silver, still clear of the rest of the field. It was her seventh medal in this event, dating back to 2003. Behind them, Shannon Rowbury used her best 1500 metres kick to separate from Maureen Koster for bronze.

== Results ==
The final was started at 13:45.

Rank	Name	Nationality	Time	Notes
1st place, gold medalist(s)	Genzebe Dibaba	Ethiopia	8:47.43	
2nd place, silver medalist(s)	Meseret Defar	Ethiopia	8:54.26	
3rd place, bronze medalist(s)	Shannon Rowbury	United States	8:55.55	
4	Maureen Koster	Netherlands	8:56.44	
5	Abbey D'Agostino	United States	8:58.40	
6	Stephanie Twell	Great Britain	9:00.38	
7	Betsy Saina	Kenya	9:01.86	
~~8~~	Betlhem Desalegn	United Arab Emirates	~~9:03.30~~	DQ
8	Jessica O'Connell	Canada	9:05.71	
9	Nancy Chepkwemoi	Kenya	9:07.63	
10	Sviatlana Kudzelich	Belarus	9:17.45	
11	Sheila Reid	Canada	9:19.67	
12	Josephine Moultrie	Great Britain	9:29.10	
—N/a	Renata Pliś	Poland	DNS	

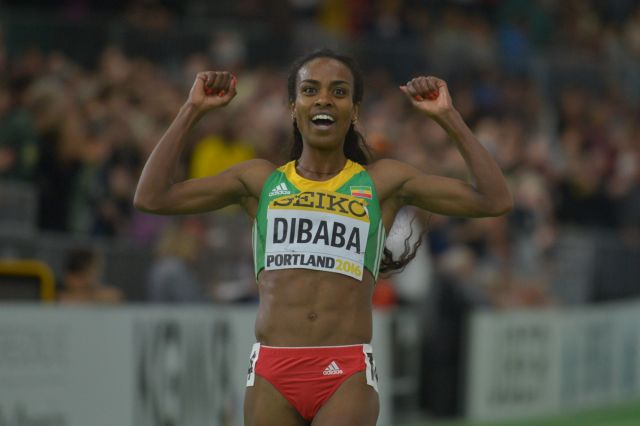
Winner Genzebe Dibaba after crossing the finish line
