= Azza Al-Qasmi =

Bahraini sport shooter

Azza Ali Al-Qasmi (born 12 February 1985) is a Bahraini sport shooter. She was the flag bearer for Bahrain and part of the Bahraini Olympic team at the 2012 Summer Olympics.

== Olympic career ==
She competed in the women's 50 metre rifle three positions at the London Olympics. She did not advance further into the event but had scored a new Arab shooting record, having achieved a score of 576 points, including 21 inner-tens, across the three positions. She ranked 33rd overall.

== Personal life ==
Azza was born in the town of Riffa, in the Kingdom of Bahrain. She is bilingual in English and Arabic.
