= Anlene Orchard Mile =

The Anlene Orchard Mile is a sporting event held on 10 June 2007 in Singapore. The event is exclusive to women held in where women either run or walk a mile (1.6 kilometres) on a straight course down Orchard Road. Two lanes of Orchard Road was closed off for the event. The flag-off for the mile begins near the Dhoby Ghaut MRT station and ends near Orchard MRT station.

== History ==
The Anlene Orchard Mile was first launched in Singapore in 2007 and was sponsored by Anlene, a dairy nutrition corporation. The aim is to highlight the risk of osteoporosis and raise bone health awareness about building strong bones from within through a sufficient calcium intake of milk everyday coupled with weight bearing exercises as well as to foster the growth and recognition of women in sports in Singapore. The inaugural event in 2007 saw over 2,000 female participants taking part with local TV and radio celebrities lending their name to the cause. Although Anlene Orchard Mile is a running event, participants can walk the race according to their own fitness level. For 2007 and 2008, the official beneficiary of the Anlene Orchard Mile has been the Osteoporosis Society of Singapore (the local chapter of the International Osteoporosis Foundation), where a portion of the proceeds goes to the society. The Anlene Orchard Mile is modelled against successful mile events around the world including the prestigious Fifth Avenue Mile in New York and the Sport Relief Mile which attracts over 10,000 runners and walkers to 15 events across England.

== Entrants ==
The Anlene Orchard Mile comprises three categories – the Elite Mile, the Women's Mile and the Corporate Mile. The Elite Mile is an invitational category with a cash prize that is open to competitive runners where past race records are compulsory for verification before an invitation is extended for participation by the organisers. The Anlene Orchard Mile 2007 Elite category winner was Suzy Walsham, a two-time winner of the U.S. Empire State Building Run-up, who walked away with a cash prize of SGD10,500.

The Women's Mile is a category open to women of all ages and fitness levels. The Corporate Mile is targeted at corporations where female employees are encouraged to participate in groups of four or more.
