= Lisa Dobriskey =

English middle-distance runner (born 1983)

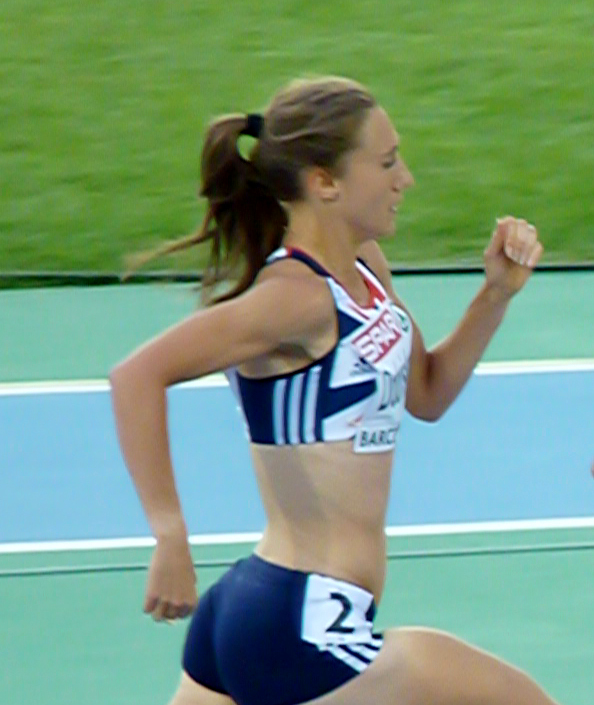

Personal information
- Nationality: English
- Born: 23 December 1983 (age 42) Ashford, Kent
- Height: 1.70 m (5 ft 7 in)
- Weight: 58 kg (128 lb)

Sport
- Sport: Women's athletics
- Events: 800 metres, 1500 metres

Achievements and titles
- Personal bests: 800m: 2:00.14; 1500m: 3:59.50
Medal record
Representing Great Britain
World Championships
Silver medal – second place	2009 Berlin	1500 m
Representing England
Commonwealth Games
Gold medal – first place	2006 Melbourne	1500 m

Lisa Jane Dobriskey (born 23 December 1983 in Ashford, Kent) is a retired English middle-distance runner. She was the Commonwealth Games champion in the 1500 m in 2006 and won a silver medal in the same distance at the 2009 World Championships.

== Career ==
After winning her school's 800 m at age 11, her teachers suggested that she join the local athletic club. Dobriskey won Amateur Athletic Association titles at Under 15/17/20 and 23. She was the fastest British under-17 girl at 800m (2:08.67) and fourth fastest at 1500 m (4:31.7) in 1999, and the third fastest at 1500 m (4:28.10) in 2000. She won the English Schools 800 m title for Juniors in 1998 and for Intermediates in 1999 and made her junior international debut indoors against Germany and France at 1500 m in 2000. In the English Schools cross country running she was 4th in the Junior girls in 1998 and 3rd in the Intermediates in 1999. She was 2nd in the Inter-counties U15 cc in 1999.

She won the gold medal in the women's 1500 m event at the 2006 Commonwealth Games.

She finished 4th in the final of the 1500 m in the 2008 Olympic Games in Beijing, resulting in her ranking fourth in the world for the 1500 m. After this, she won the Fifth Avenue Mile competition with the second fastest ever time recorded by a female athlete at the race.

After suffering a stress fracture in her back early in the 2009 season, she finished third in the 1500 m at the 2009 World Championships in Athletics at the Olympiastadion in Berlin, Germany. Dobriskey was upgraded to silver after winner Natalia Rodriguez of Spain was disqualified for shoving Ethiopian Gelete Burika, who fell on the last lap.

At the 2012 Summer Olympics, she reached the 1500 m final again, finishing in 10th place. After the race, Dobriskey referred to possible doping by some of her rivals, saying "I don't believe I'm competing on a level playing field". Race winner Aslı Çakır Alptekin was subsequently stripped of the gold medal in 2015 and given an eight-year ban from competition after testing positive for banned substances. Second-placed finisher Gamze Bulut was subsequently stripped of her silver medal in 2017 after testing positive for banned substances, and Tatyana Tomashova, who was moved up to second place following Alptekin & Bulut's disqualifications, was stripped of her silver medal in 2024 for similar offences. The seventh-placed finished Natallia Kareiva, who came seventh, and the ninth-placed finisher Yekaterina Kostetskaya were also subsequently disqualified. In all, five out of the twelve runners in the race were subsequently disqualified for retrospective doping offences. Six of the nine runners who finished ahead of Dobriskey in the final have been linked to the use of performance-enhancing drugs during their careers.

== Statistics ==
Dobriskey's personal best in the 1500 m ranks her sixth on the British all-time list.

== Personal bests ==
Event	Time	Year	Venue
400 m	56.00	2002	Eton
800 m	2:00.14	2010	London
1500 m	3:59.50	2009	Zurich
3000 m	8:54.12	2007	Loughborough

== Personal life ==
She was born in Ashford, Kent of Polish descent and spent her childhood in New Romney before attending Loughborough University. Her younger brothers David and Steven reached county level at middle-distance running, javelin and discus. Her father is a soil consultant, who worked for construction company Sir Robert McAlpine at the site of the 2012 London Olympics.

Dobriskey is married to former 800 m runner Ricky Soos.

As of November 2024, Dobriskey runs a Pilates studio in Arizona.
