= 2013 European Athletics U23 Championships – Women's 5000 metres =

The Women's 5000 metres event at the 2013 European Athletics U23 Championships was held in Tampere, Finland, at Ratina Stadium on 14 July.

== Medalists ==
Gold	Layes Abdullayeva; Azerbaijan
Silver	Kate Avery; United Kingdom
Bronze	Liv Westphal; France

== Results ==
=== Final ===
14 July 2013

Rank	Name	Nationality	Time	Notes
DQ	Gamze Bulut	Turkey	~~15:45.03~~	~~PB~~
1st place, gold medalist(s)	Layes Abdullayeva	Azerbaijan	15:51.72	
2nd place, silver medalist(s)	Kate Avery	United Kingdom	15:54.07	
DQ	Tsenynesh Tsenga	Azerbaijan	~~16:06.70~~	~~PB~~
3rd place, bronze medalist(s)	Liv Westphal	France	16:08.85	
4	Monica Madalina Florea	Romania	16:12.61	
5	Jamie van Lieshout	Netherlands	16:14.48	
6	Tania Carretero	Spain	16:14.82	PB
7	Irene van Lieshout	Netherlands	16:19.30	PB
8	Monika Juodeškaitė	Lithuania	16:22.46	
9	Natalia Wacławska	Poland	16:24.81	
10	Esma Aydemir	Turkey	16:28.68	
11	Elin Borglund	Sweden	16:38.99	
12	Marlin van Hal	Netherlands	16:40.98	
13	Jennifer Wenth	Austria	16:41.46	
14	Priska Auf Der Maur	Switzerland	16:42.11	SB
15	Ana Vega	Spain	16:44.80	
16	Beth Potter	United Kingdom	16:45.67	
17	Laura Bottini	Italy	16:55.38	
18	Teodora Simović	Serbia	17:09.85	
19	Jessica Pulina	Italy	17:13.30	
20	Tatsiana Stsefanenka	Belarus	17:14.75	
21	Dominika Napieraj	Poland	17:19.20	
	Burcu Büyükbezgin	Turkey	DNS	

Intermediate times:
1000m: 3:11.49 Layes Abdullayeva Azerbaijan
2000m: 6:17.35 Gamze Bulut Turkey
3000m: 9:17.79 Gamze Bulut Turkey
4000m: 12:33.29 Gamze Bulut Turkey

== Participation ==
According to an unofficial count, 23 athletes from 15 countries participated in the event.

- Austria (1)
- Azerbaijan (2)
- Belarus (1)
- France (1)
- Italy (2)
- Lithuania (1)
- Netherlands (3)
- Poland (2)
- Romania (1)
- Serbia (1)
- Spain (2)
- Sweden (1)
- Switzerland (1)
- Turkey (2)
- United Kingdom (2)
