= Abbey Cooper =

American runner

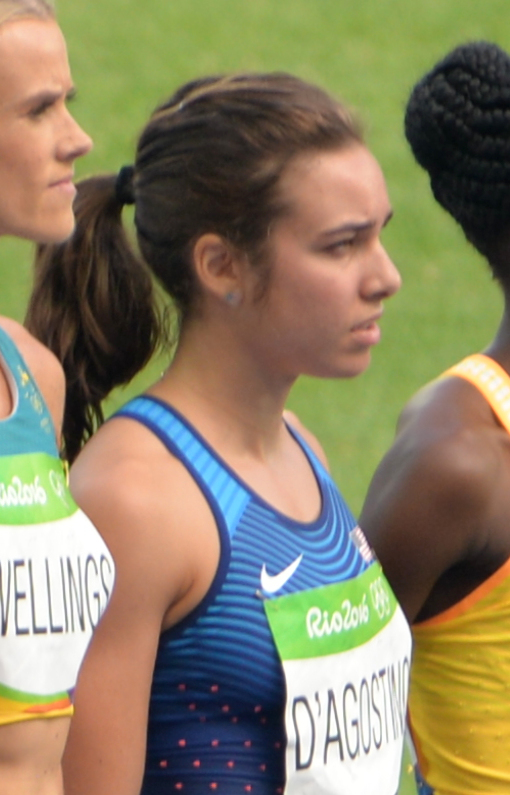
- Cooper at the 2016 Summer Olympics

Personal information
- Born: Abbey D'Agostino; May 25, 1992 (age 34) Topsfield, Massachusetts, U.S.
- Height: 5 ft 2.5 in (159 cm)
- Weight: 104 lb (47 kg)

Sport
- Country: United States
- Events: 5,000m, 10,000 m, Cross country running
- College team: Dartmouth Big Green
- Club: New Balance Boston
- Turned pro: 2014
- Coached by: Chris Layne

Achievements and titles
- Highest world ranking: (52nd-2014) (25th-2015) (14th-2016) 5,000 meters
- Personal bests: 800 m: 2:08.11 1500 m: 4:08.78; Mile: 4:28.31; 3000 m: 8:51.88; 5000 m: 14:52.37 10000 m: 33:10.38

Abbey Cooper (née D'Agostino; born May 25, 1992) is an American middle- and long-distance runner. Cooper is the most decorated Ivy League athlete in track and field and cross country running. She is the first Dartmouth female distance runner to win an NCAA title. She won a total of seven NCAA titles (1 – cross country; 4 – indoor track; 2 – outdoor track) in her career. In 2014, she became a professional runner for New Balance.

At the 2016 Summer Olympics in Rio de Janeiro, she received considerable international media attention following an incident during a 5000m heat in which both she and New Zealander Nikki Hamblin fell. The two women helped each other finish the race and were allowed to compete in the final, but Cooper had suffered a torn anterior crucial ligament and meniscus and wasn't able to participate further. Both athletes were praised for their sportsmanship and "Olympic spirit", and were subsequently awarded the Rio 2016 Fair Play Award by the International Fair Play Committee.

== Personal life ==
Cooper attended Masconomet Regional High School in Boxford, Massachusetts. She graduated from Dartmouth College in 2014. Her mother Donna competed for the UMass-Dartmouth Corsairs. She has two younger sisters, Lily and Julia.

She is a devout Christian. She married Jacob Cooper in July 2018, who played football in college at Taylor University and now works as the clinical sport psychologist at Appalachian State University, and Joe Gibbs Racing. The couple had their first child, a daughter, in January 2023 and their second child, a son, in June 2025.

== Dartmouth ==
In 2013 Cooper became the first Ivy League athlete, male or female, to win an NCAA Cross Country National Championship. After winning her 2013 NCAA Cross Country title and 5th NCAA title in her career, she praised coach Mark Coogan for the preparation for championship running and close finishes; She won the NCAA cross country title by outdistancing Emma Bates by a few seconds. She is the first Ivy League athlete to win 7 individual NCAA Championships. She is also the only woman ever to have won both the 3000 meters and 5000 meters NCAA Indoor Track and Field Championships twice in a career which she did in 2013 as a junior and again in 2014 as a senior. Cooper broke Ryan Pandolfini's (née Fagan) long-standing 10K record by over a minute in 2014, and is the current Dartmouth record holder in the 3K, 5K, and 10K. She won the Honda Sports Award as the nation's best female collegiate cross country runner in 2014.

Cooper earned her final Ivy league titles May 2014. She graduated with a degree in psychology in 2014.

Year	Ivy League cross country	NCAA Cross Country	Ivy League Indoor	NCAA Indoor	Ivy League Outdoor	NCAA Outdoor
2010–11	–	–	3000 7th	–	5000 1st	5000 3rd
2011–12	1st XC	3rd XC	Mile 1st; 5000 2nd	DMR 3rd; 3000 8th	4x800 2nd; 3000 1st; 1500 1st	5000 1st
2012–13	–	2nd XC	4x880 yards 3rd; 5000 1st; Mile 1st	5000 1st; 3000 1st	4x800 3rd; 3000 1st; 1500 1st	5000 1st
2013–14	1st XC	1st XC	5000 1st; 4x800 1st; Mile 1st	DMR 8th; 3000 1st; 5000 1st	3000 1st; 5000 1st; 10000 1st	5000 3rd

== Professional ==
=== 2012 ===
Cooper's 5th place at 2012 Olympic Trials 5000 meters and nearly clinching a spot on the Olympic team is one of the closest finishes in Olympic Trials distance races (less than 0.19 seconds between 3–4–5). In 2012, at 20 years of age her platform as a star in the NCAA created a national following.

=== 2014 ===
After graduating from Dartmouth in 2014, Cooper earned a sponsorship with New Balance based in Boston, Massachusetts. Abbey was coached by her college coach Mark Coogan under whom she was a 7-time NCAA champion from 2014 to 2018.

Cooper is ranked 19th in the world in the 5000 meters and 65th in the 10,000 meters in 2014.

Cooper debuted as a New Balance athlete in October 2014 in the 24th Mayor's Cup presented by the Boston Athletic Association placing fourth behind winner Rachel Hannah of Canada and the Boston Athletic Association's Juliet Bottorff and Jen Rhines.

=== 2015 ===
Cooper ran the 5000m in 15:42.79 at Payton Jordan Invitational in Stanford, CA (USA) on May 2, 2015. She won the 5000 meters at the Hoka One One Adrian Martinez Classic in 15:23.66 on June 4.

Cooper earned a US Roster spot to the IAAF 2015 World Championships in Athletics by qualifying in the 5000 meters in 15:06.59 at the 2015 USA Outdoor Track and Field Championships. On July 18, she finished 3rd in 15:03.85 in Heusden, Belgium. On August 27, she finished 23rd in 16:16.47 at 2015 World Championships in Athletics – Women's 5000 metres.

=== 2016 ===
On January 2, Cooper ran a personal best in a mixed gender 3000 meters at Boston University in 8:51.88. On March 12, she placed second in women 3000 meters in 8:57.31 at 2016 USA Indoor Track and Field Championships to represent the United States at 2016 IAAF World Indoor Championships – Women's 3000 metres. She finished in a time of 8:58.40 in 3000 meters at 2016 IAAF World Indoor Championships to place fifth.

On June 17, Cooper placed third in 5000 meters at 2016 Adidas BOOST Boston Games in 15:22.29. On July 10, she placed fifth in 15:14.04 at 2016 United States Olympic Trials (track and field) and was selected to represent USA along with Team USA teammates Shelby Houlihan and Kim Conley at Athletics at the 2016 Summer Olympics - Women's 5000 metres when Molly Huddle and Emily Infeld passed to focus on their 10 km race in Rio de Janeiro.

On August 16, with about 2000 meters to go in a qualifying heat for the women's 5000 meter race at the 2016 Summer Olympics, Cooper tripped over Nikki Hamblin who had fallen in front of her. Instead of immediately continuing the race, she first helped Hamblin up, encouraging her not to quit. Cooper herself, however, had torn her ACL and meniscus. Despite her obvious pain, she nevertheless finished the race, after which she and Hamblin embraced. Cooper, Hamblin and Jennifer Wenth were advanced to the final because of the incident, but Cooper wasn't able to compete because of her injuries.

On August 20, for their actions at the Rio Olympics, Cooper and Hamblin received Fair Play awards from The International Fair Play Committee (CIFP), with the support of the International Olympic Committee (IOC).

=== 2017 ===
Cooper returned to competition at Franklin Park (Boston) 2017 Mayor's Cup Cross Country Championships finishing second over 5 km in 16:48.

On November 4, Cooper competed in her road debut at the US 5 km road championship finishing seventh in a time of 16:00.

=== 2018 ===
Cooper left Mark Coogan and Boston after getting married in July 2018. She began being coached by Chris Layne in Asheville, North Carolina. Cooper won 5 km at 2018 Johnson City Turkey Trot in 16:58.

=== 2019 ===
June 1, 2019 marked Cooper's first return to the track following the Rio Olympics. Cooper competed at the 2019 USA Outdoor Track and Field Championships in the 5000 meters race where she finished 14th.

=== 2021 ===
In the first heat of the 5000m meters at the 2020 United States Olympic Trials (track and field), Cooper met the Olympic standard with a time of 15:07.80. Cooper finished in fourth place in the final three days later on June 21.

Cooper ran a new personal best of 14:52.37 in the 5000m at the Prefontaine Classic on August 20, 2021.

== Competition record ==
Year	Competition	Venue	Position	Event	Notes
2015	World Championships	Beijing, China	22nd	5000 m	16:16.47
2016	World Indoor Championships	Portland, Oregon	5th	3000 m	8:58.40
2016	2016 Summer Olympics	Rio de Janeiro, Brazil	18th	5000 meters	17:10.02

=== USA National Championships ===
Year	Competition	Venue	Position	Event	Notes
2012	US Olympic Trials	Eugene, Oregon	5th	5000 m	15:19.98
2015	USA Outdoor Track and Field Championships	Eugene, Oregon	3rd	5000m	15:06.59
2016	USA Indoor Track and Field Championships	Portland, Oregon	2nd	3000 m	8:57.31
2016	US Olympic Trials	Eugene, Oregon	5th	5000 m	15:14.04
2017	US 5 km Road Championships hosted by Abbott Dash to the Finish Line 5K	New York, New York	7th	5000 m	16:00
2019	USA Outdoor Track and Field Championships	Des Moines, Iowa	14th	5000m	15:56.20
2021	US Olympic Trials	Eugene, Oregon	4th	5000 m	15:31.05
