= Sally Edwards =

American triathlete

Medal record

Women's triathlon

Representing United States

Ironman World Championship
Silver medal – second place	1981	Individual
Bronze medal – third place	1982 (Oct)	Individual

Sally Edwards (born September 10, 1947) is the CEO and Founder of Heart Zones, Inc. She is an author, entrepreneur, professional triathlete, motivational speaker, and app developer. Edwards supported and then qualified for the first women's marathon Olympic Trials in 1984. She is one of the original founders of the national governing body of triathlon, USA Triathlon. Edwards has been inducted into two Halls of Fame: the Triathlon Hall of Fame in 2012 and the Sacramento Running Hall of Fame in 2016. She is the author of 25 books on subjects including triathlons, training with a heart rate monitor, indoor cycling with wearable devices, sports snowshoeing, school PE curricula using wearable devices. For twenty-two years, Edwards was the national spokeswoman for the Danskin Women's Triathlon Series.

Heart Zones is a fitness technology, education, and training company headquartered in Sacramento. It was founded in 1993 by CEO Sally Edwards, a Hall of Fame triathlete and serial entrepreneur who previously co-founded the Fleet Feet athletic shoe chain in 1976. Edwards founded the company with the mission to get "America fit" by using biofeedback to help individuals understand their own physiology.

In August 2012, Edwards developed the patented Heart Zones Threshold Training System. This training method received the first ever patent awarded for a cardio training program. Today, Heart Zones licenses their technology in 10 countries, over 2,000 locations including schools, health clubs, and healthcare facilities. In 2021, Edwards moved to Oregon with her partner who later died from cancer in July 2024. She currently resides in Medford with her blind rescue dog, Aggie.

== Career ==
Edwards is an entrepreneur, who has founded six companies including:

- Heart Zones Inc. an international fitness and health technology, training and education company,
- Upbeat Workouts, an iPhone app that matches the user's music to their steps for runners, walkers, and cyclists.
- ZONING Fitness, a patented and branded cardio exercise program using the Blink flashing zones heart rate monitor,
- Fleet Feet (a national chain of franchise retail running specialty stores);
- Yuba Snowshoes (sports-performance snowshoes); and,
- The Sally Edwards Company, a professional speaking business.

Edwards is also a motivational speaker.

=== Sports career ===
Edwards has completed over 250 races including more than 150 Danskin Triathlons and 16 Ironman Triathlons. She is a former holder of the master's world record in the Ironman, and the past national spokesperson for the Danskin series of women-only sprint triathlons. Her background in multi-sport competition is extensive spanning four decades. She has won the Western States 100 Mile Endurance Run, the 100 mile Iditashoe Snowshoe Race, Race Across America Relay division, and numerous marathons. She has won the Ride and Tie four times (the Ride and Tie championship is a team of two humans alternately running and riding an equine partner over a difficult 35-40 mile trail). She has also participated in adventure races around the world.

== Works ==
=== Books ===
- Triathlon: A Triple Fitness Sport: The first complete guide to challenge you to a new total fitness (1982)
- The Woman Runner's Training Diary (1984)
- The Triathlon Training and Racing Book (1985)
- The Equilibrium Plan: Balancing Diet and Exercise for Lifetime Fitness (1987)
- Triathlons for Kids (1992)
- The Heart Rate Monitor Book (1992)
- Heart Rate Monitor Book (1993)
- Heart Zone Training: Exercise Smart, Stay Fit, and Live Longer (1996)
- Smart Heart: High Performance Heart Zone Training (1997)
- Caterpillars to Butterflies by Triathletes (from the Danskin Women's Triathlon Series) (1997). Coauthored by Maggie Sullivan
- The Heart Rate Monitor Guidebook to Heart Zone Training (revised 2010)
- The Heart Rate Monitor Log (2000)
- The Triathlon Log (2000)
- The Complete Book of Triathlons (2001)
- The Heart Rate Monitor Workbook for Indoor Cyclists (2001) co authored by Sally Reed
- The Heart Rate Monitor Book for Outdoor and Indoor Cyclists: A Heart Zone Training Program (2002) co authored by Sally Reed
- Triathlons for Women: Training Plans, Equipment, Nutrition (2002)
- Middle School Healthy Hearts in the Zones (2002)
- High School Healthy Hearts in the Zones (2002)
- Be a Better Runner: 2011
- ZONING, Fitness in a Blink 2012
- Smart PE: Lessons using Heart Rate Monitors and Step Trackers (2018)
- Threshold Cycling: 30 Indoor Rides Using the Heart Zones Method (2020)
- Edwards, Sally; Sally Reed (2006). Heart Zones Cycling: The Avid Cyclist's Guide to Riding Faster and Farther. Boulder, Colorado: VeloPress. p. 296 pages. ISBN 1-931382-84-0.
