= Marathon Sports (retailer) =

American sporting goods retailer

Marathon Sports, LLC.
- Trade name: Marathon Sports
- Company type: Private
- Industry: Retail, Specialty
- Founded: 1975 in Cambridge, Massachusetts, United States)
- Founder: Howard Sagrans
- Headquarters: Waltham, Massachusetts
- Number of locations: 22 (19 Marathon Sports and 3 Runner's Alley)
- Area served: Connecticut, Maine, Massachusetts, New Hampshire, and Rhode Island
- Products: Running/Walking Footwear and Athletic Apparel
- Website: marathonsports.com soundrunner.com runnersalley.com

Marathon Sports, LLC. is an American chain of sporting goods retailers founded in 1975. It is headquartered in Waltham, Massachusetts, and operates 14 locations in Massachusetts, 4 locations in Connecticut, and one location in Rhode Island operating under the Marathon Sports brand and three locations in New Hampshire operating under the Runner's Alley brand. The chain mainly sells running/walking footwear and athletic apparel.

All stores that fall under the Marathon Sports, LLC. umbrella are considered run specialty stores. Run specialty stores specialize in all aspects related to running including running shoes, socks, nutrition, hydration and apparel. Employees are trained in how to fit customers for running and walking shoes and are very knowledgeable on any injuries related to running. The stores under Marathon Sports, LLC. umbrella are involved with their local running communities. Many stores have training groups for races, from 5ks to half marathons.

== RunBase ==
In a joint venture between Marathon Sports, the Boston Athletic Association and athletic supplier Adidas opened a 2,000 sq ft (190 m^{2}) Boston Marathon museum, locker room, and retail store just blocks from the marathon finish line. Historic relics displayed include clothing and shoes worn by runners and a second-place medal from the first Boston Marathon in 1897. The store was managed and staffed by Marathon Sports and featured clothing, shoes, and other products from Adidas. This new retail concept was planned to become a community hub for runners who lived in or were traveling to the city. RunBase closed in 2018.

== History ==
=== Boston Marathon bombing ===
On Patriots' Day, April 15, 2013, the 117th annual Boston Marathon was struck by two pressure cooker bombs, with the first exploding outside the Marathon Sports store located at 671–673 Boylston Street at 2:49:43 pm EDT. Employees of the store provided first aid to some of the bombing victims by using clothing as makeshift tourniquets. Staff members and customers also testified at the bombing trial against then-suspect Dzhokhar Tsarnaev in 2015.

=== Purchase by Fleet Feet ===
In June 2022, Fleet Feet purchased the 11-store Marathon Sports chain, the New Hampshire-based Runner's Alley locations, and the Connecticut soundRunner store locations. Marathon Sports, however, functions as a separate company. In 2025, Marathon Sports acquired Fleet Feet Maine Running.

== Awards ==
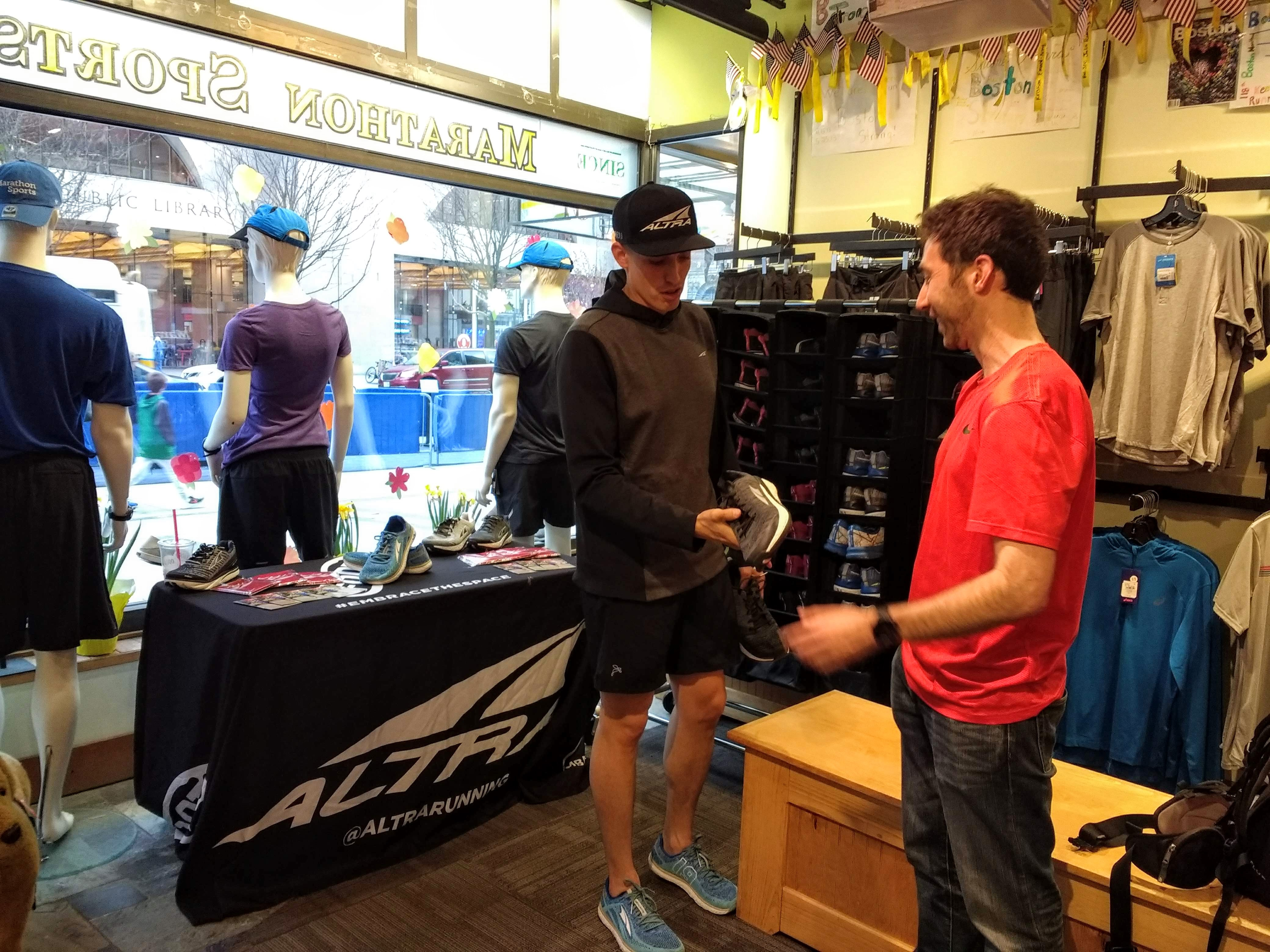
Altra sponsoring a demo run of their shoes at the Marathon Sports store on Boston.

- Voted one of the 50 best-running stores in America for 2012 and 2015
- Multi-year winner of the "Best of Boston" in the category "Running Shop"
