= Jenny Simpson =

American runner (born 1986)

Jenny M. Simpson
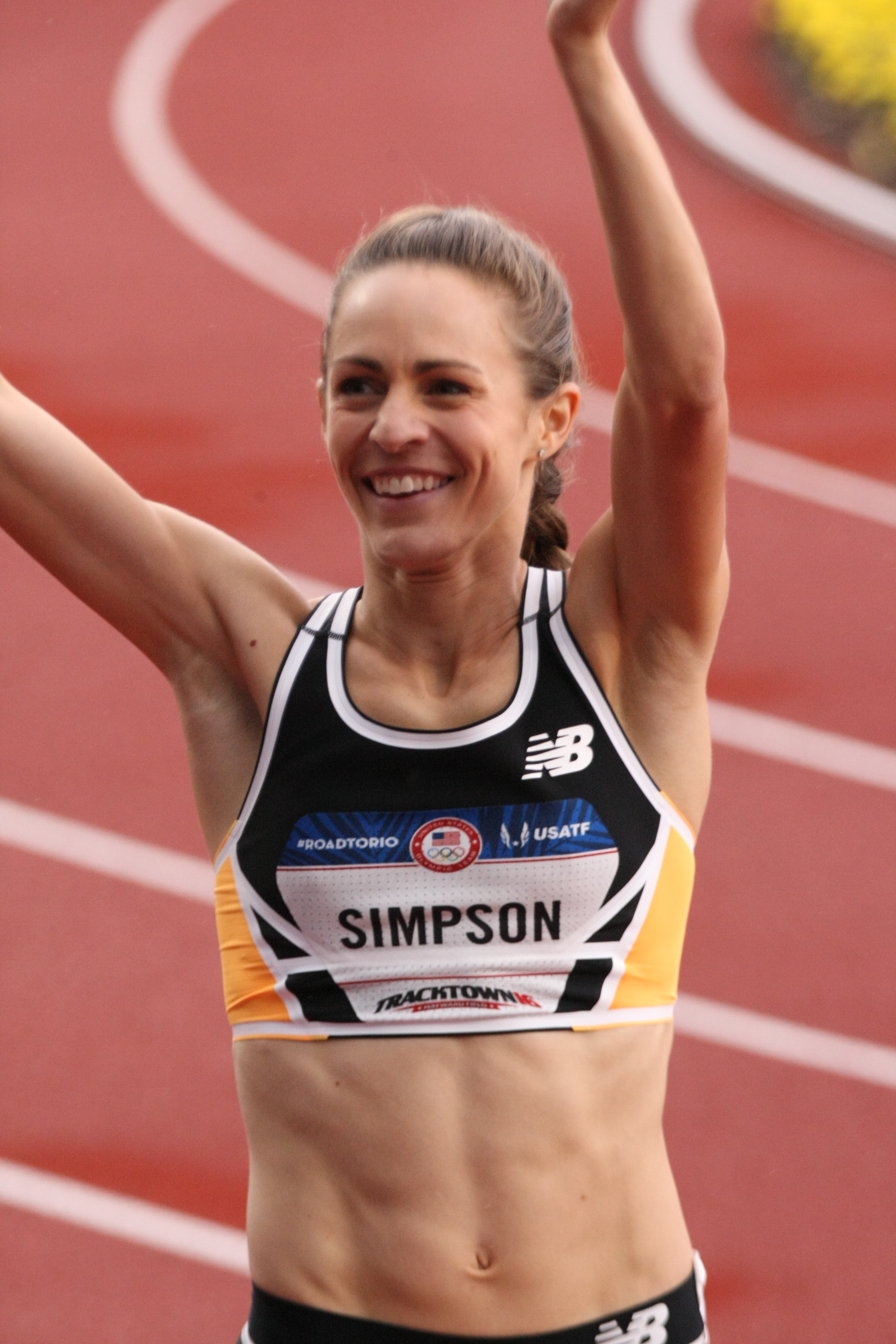
- Simpson at the 2016 Olympic Trials

Personal information
- Born: Jennifer Mae Barringer; August 23, 1986 (age 40) Webster City, Iowa, U.S.
- Home town: Oviedo, Florida, U.S. Boulder, Colorado, U.S.
- Employers: Fleet Feet (2026–present); Puma (2022–2026); New Balance (2010–2022)
- Height: 5 ft 5 in (165 cm)
- Weight: 110 lb (50 kg)

Sport
- Country: United States
- Sport: Track and field
- Events: 1500 m, 3000 m, 5000 m, Steeplechase
- College team: Colorado Buffaloes
- Turned pro: 2010
- Coached by: Mark Wetmore
- Retired: 2024

Achievements and titles
- Personal bests: 1500 m: 3:57.22 (Paris 2014); Mile: 4:17.30 (London 2018); 3000 m: 8:29.58 (Brussels 2014); 5000 m: 14:56.26 (Zürich 2013); 3000 m SC: 9:12.50 (Berlin 2009); Half-Marathon: 1:10:35 (Houston 2023); Indoors; 1500 m: 4:07.27i (New York 2012); Mile: 4:25.91i (College Station 2009); 3000 m: 8:40.31i (Boston 2018); 5000 m: 14:58.67i (Boston 2020)
Medal record
Women's athletics
Representing the United States
Olympic Games
Bronze medal – third place	2016 Rio de Janeiro	1500 m
World Championships
Gold medal – first place	2011 Daegu	1500 m
Silver medal – second place	2013 Moscow	1500 m
Silver medal – second place	2017 London	1500 m
Diamond League
First place	2014	1500 m

Jennifer Simpson (née Barringer; born August 23, 1986) is a retired American middle- and long-distance runner. She won the gold medal in the 1500 meters at the 2011 World Championships, silvers at the 2013 and 2017 World Championships, and a bronze at the 2016 Rio Olympics.

Simpson is a former American record holder for the 3000 metres steeplechase. She represented the United States at the 2008 Beijing, 2012 London, and 2016 Rio de Janeiro. She was the 2014 Diamond League 1500 m winner. Simpson won 11 individual American national titles. She is a four-time individual NCAA Division I champion.

In February 2026, Fleet Feet appointed Simpson as its first-ever Chief Running Officer.

== Running career ==
=== High school ===
As a student at Oviedo High School, Jenny Barringer was a 5-time state champion in track and a 3-time state champion in cross country. On 3 February 2018, Oviedo High School renamed their track Jenny Simpson Track in her honor. She also set Florida high school records in the mile, two-mile, 5000 m, and three-mile. Barringer finished 3rd in San Diego's Foot Locker Cross Country Championships in 2003 behind winner Katelyn Kaltenbach of Colorado and Marie Lawrence of Nevada. In the regional, Barringer came on strong and won for the second straight year in identical times of 17:27, becoming the first Florida girl ever to win the Footlocker South regional twice. She finished 10th in San Diego's Footlocker cross country national championship in 2004.

=== Collegiate ===
At Colorado, Barringer won the 2006 NCAA Outdoor championship steeplechase in a time of 9:53.04. The following year, she won the USATF Outdoor steeplechase championship in 9:34.64.

She finished 7th in heats at the IAAF World Outdoors in the steeplechase in a time of 9:51.04. She finished 7th at the NCAA Outdoors in 2007 in the steeplechase with a time of 9:59.81. She also ran at Drake Relays in the steeplechase in a time of 9:44.31. In April 2007, she finished 4th in 5,000m at Stanford in a time of 15:48.24.

At the time of her 2008 Olympic appearance, Barringer was enrolled at the University of Colorado. At the U.S. trials, Barringer qualified for the United States Olympic team by finishing third in the steeplechase.

Barringer qualified for the first women's steeplechase final in Olympic history by finishing third in her heat. She set a new American record of 9:22.26 in the final and placed ninth.

In 2009, she set NCAA records in the mile, 3000 m, and 5000 m indoors, 1500 m, 3000 m steeplechase, and 5000 m outdoors. She also topped her own American record in the steeplechase at the 2009 World Championships with a time of 9:12:50, finishing 5th overall.

While primarily a steeplechaser, she ran 3:59.90 in the 1500 m at the 2009 Prefontaine Classic. At the time of the event, this performance made her the third-fastest female 1500 m runner in U.S. track and field history.

Barringer came fifth at the 2009 World Championships in Athletics, running a North American record time of 9:12.50 minutes for the event. It is also the best mark by any athlete from the Americas. She was the 2009 US Champion in the steeplechase.

While at Colorado, she won the Honda Sports Award as the nation's best collegiate female track and field athlete in 2009.

Despite the fact that she could have signed a professional contract, Barringer returned to school in the fall of 2009 to compete in cross country. On October 31, 2009, Barringer captured the Big 12 individual title, running a 6-kilometer course in 20 minutes, 27.46 seconds. She was favored to win the NCAA Cross Country Championship on November 23, 2009, but collapsed after leading for the first two miles. She wound up in 163rd place. Barringer commented that she felt light headed all of a sudden.

Barringer won the Inaugural Bowerman Award in 2009. The Bowerman Award is given to the college track athlete of the Year.

=== Professional ===
In January 2010, Barringer signed a multi-year endorsement deal with New Balance. Barringer later changed coaches from her University of Colorado at Boulder coach, Mark Wetmore, in favor of the Air Force Academy coach Juli Benson.

Barringer missed most of the 2010 season due to a stress reaction in her right femur. She married runner Jason Simpson on October 8, 2010, taking on Simpson as her last name from that date.

Simpson began the 2011 season strong, winning the mile and 3000 meters championships at the 2011 USA Indoor Track and Field Championships. She qualified for the 2011 World Championships in Athletics by finishing second in the 1500 meters at the US Track and Field Championship.

Simpson won a gold medal at the 1500 meters at the World Championships in a time of 4:05:40. She beat rivals Hannah England and Natalia Rodriguez. Simpson's gold medal was considered a surprise. She became the first American woman to win the event since Mary Decker at the inaugural World Championships in 1983.

On July 1, 2012, Simpson qualified for the 2012 Summer Olympics with a third-place finish in the women's 1500 m at the 2012 United States Olympic Trials. At the 2012 Summer Olympics, Simpson qualified for the 1500 meter semifinal in 4:13.89 but did not qualify for the final. She announced a return to coach Mark Wetmore in December 2012.

=== 2013 ===
Simpson claimed the USATF Outdoor 5000 meter title in 15:33.77 in the 95+ degree heat of Des Moines, Iowa, on June 23.

Simpson won a silver medal at the 2013 World Championships in Moscow on August 15, 2013, in the 1500m with a time of 4:02.99.

Simpson won the September 22, 2013 Fifth Avenue Mile in 4:19.3.

- 1st at Drake Relays 1500m (4:03.35)
- 1st at USATF Oxy HP 800m (2:00.45)
- 1st at USA Outdoors 5,000m (15:33.77)
- 3rd at Madrid 800m (2:02.15)
- 1st at Monaco 1500m (4:00.48)
- 2nd at World Outdoor 1500m (4:02.99)
- 7th at Zurich 5,000m (14:56.26)
- 10th in Brussels 1500m (4:10.70)

=== 2014 ===
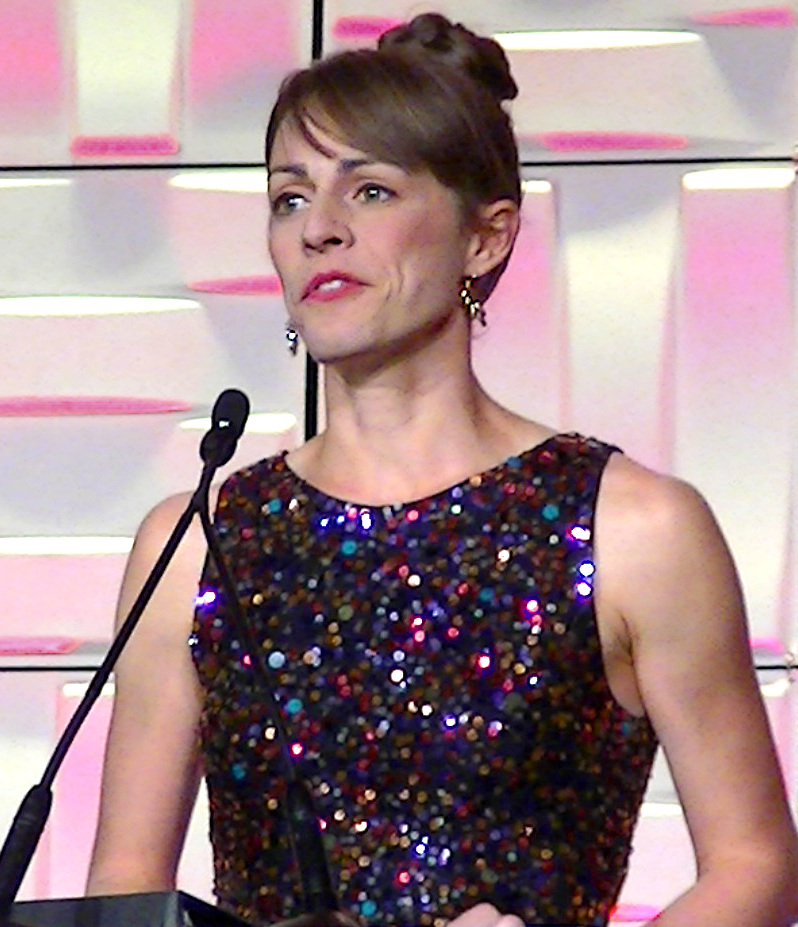
Jenny Simpson accepting the 2014 Jackie Joyner Kersee Award

Simpson was runner-up at the Boston New Balance Indoor Grand Prix 2-mile after miscounting her laps to finish in 9:26.19 on February 8.

Simpson followed that performance with a 2nd-place finish in 27:57 at the US Cross Country Championship on February 15.

At the Prefontaine Classic on May 31, she improved her personal best in the 1500 to 3:58.28. Simpson won the 1500 meters at the 2014 USA Outdoor Track and Field Championships in 4:04.96. On July 4, Simpson became the 2nd fastest American 1500 meter runner by running 3:57.22 at a Diamond League race in Paris. With two wins late in the season, including a dramatic diving finish at the Weltklasse Zürich, she won the 2014 IAAF Diamond League.

On September 13, 2014, Simpson repeated her 2013 win of the Fifth Avenue Mile in 4:19.4.

At the end of the year, she was selected as the winner of the Jackie Joyner Kersee Award.

- May 18: 4:00 2nd at Shanghai Diamond League
- May 31: 3:58 4th place at Eugene Diamond League
- June 14: 4:02 3rd at New York Diamond League
- June 29: 4:04 1st USATF Champs
- July 5: 3:57 2nd place at Paris Diamond League
- August 21: 4:00 1st Stockholm Diamond League
- August 28: 3:59 1st at Zurich Diamond League
- Sept 5th: 8:29 4th at Brussels Diamond League
- September 13: 4:19.4 at Fifth Avenue Mile

=== 2015 ===
Simpson won the Boston New Balance Indoor Grand Prix 2 mile in 9:18.35 on February 7, setting a new American record, 5 seconds ahead of Regina Jacobs' 2002 American record at the same event, 9:23.38.

At the Prefontaine Classic on May 30, she won in a season best in the 1500 opener to 4:00.28.

At the USA Outdoor Track and Field Championships in Eugene, Oregon, Simpson won the 1500m in 4:14.86, and will represent the U.S. for the 1500m in the 2015 World Championships in Athletics in Beijing, China, in August.

At the Herculis Diamond League meet at Stade Louis II in Monaco, Simpson ran 3:57.30, just .18 off Mary Slaney's nearly 32-year-old American record before the race. During that same race, a second ahead of her, Shannon Rowbury improved the American record to 3:56.29 and Genzebe Dibaba improved the world record to 3:50.07.

At the 2015 World Championships in Athletics – Women's 1500 metres in Beijing, China, Simpson finished 11th in the final round after losing her shoe and struggled, finishing in 4:16.28.

On September 11, at the Diamond League finale in Brussels, Simpson placed 4th in the mile in 4:22.18, just behind Shannon Rowbury who finished in 4:22.10.

On September 13, Simpson placed 1st in a time of 4:29.0 at New York Road Runners Fifth Avenue Mile in New York City. By the end of the year, she ran the 3000 meters standard for the 2016 IAAF World Indoor Championships in the 3000 metres at the Zürich Diamond League.

=== 2016 ===
Simpson won a bronze medal in the 1500 meters at the 2016 Olympic Games in Rio de Janeiro, to become the first American woman to win an Olympic medal in that event. On June 26, 2025, Shannon Rowbury was upgraded to a bronze medal for the London 2012 Olympics, making her the first American woman to medal in the woman's 1500m.

On September 3, she placed first in a time of 4:18.3 at the Fifth Avenue Mile in New York City.

=== 2017 ===
Simpson ran a 4:19.98 mile, finishing 5th at the London Anniversary Games on July 9, 2017, behind Hellen Obiri and Laura Muir, Winny Chebet and Angelika Cichocka, setting a personal record, and the second fastest time ever for an American woman.

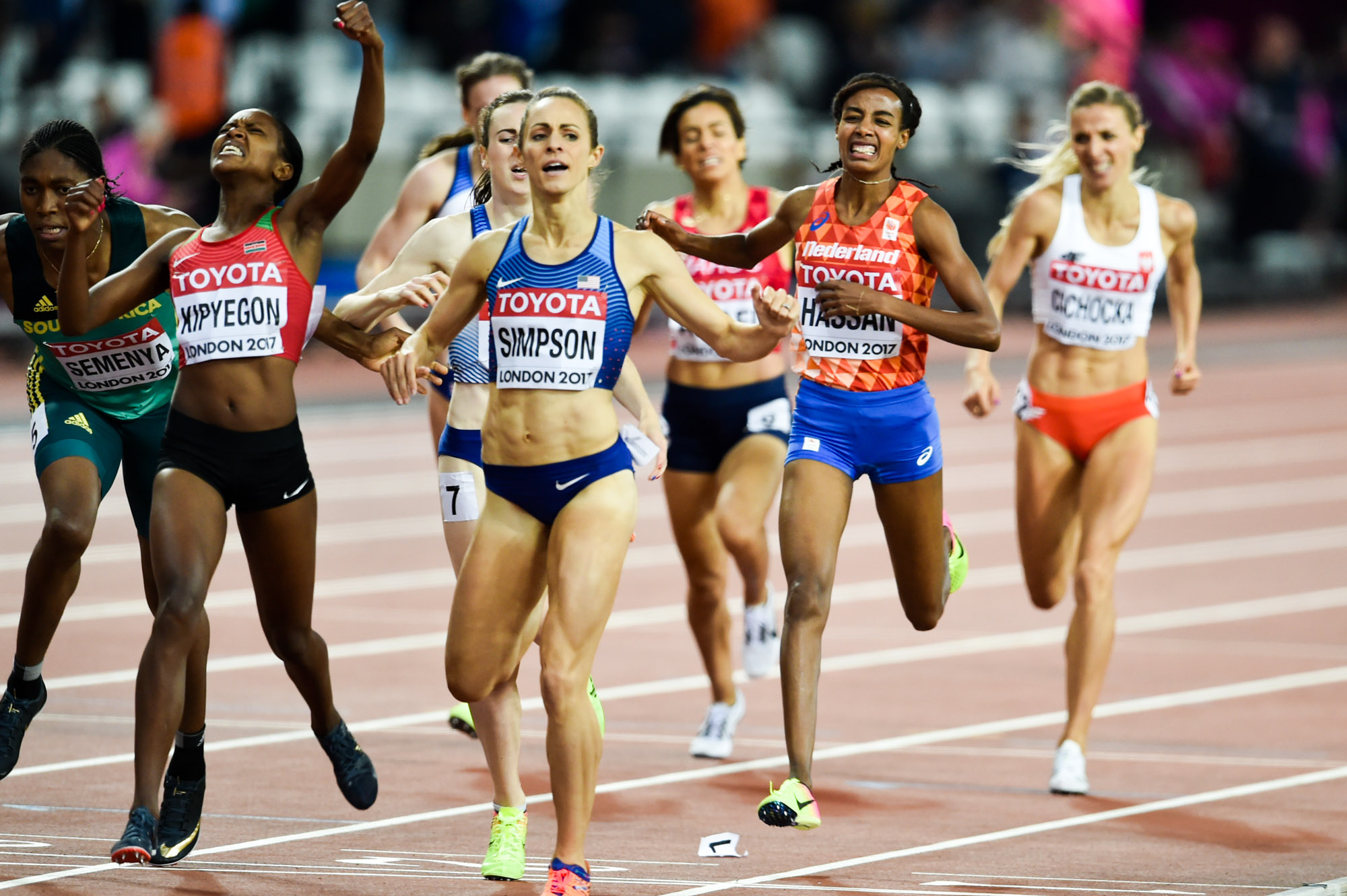
Simpson wins silver medal at the 2017 World Athletics Championships

She won her second silver medal in the World Championships 1500m event on August 7, 2017, at the 2017 World Championships, finishing in 4:02.76, less than 0.2 seconds behind Faith Chepngetich Kipyegon.

Simpson capped her 2017 campaign with a record-setting win at the New York Road Runners Fifth Avenue Mile. In addition to achieving a record sixth Fifth Avenue title, she tied the longstanding meet record with a time of 4:16.6.

=== 2018–2021 ===
Simpson won the Fifth Avenue Mile again in 2018, making it six straight and seven total Fifth Avenue titles.

On September 8, 2019, Simpson bettered her best time in the Fifth Avenue Mile, running 4:16.1 to give her sole possession of the event record. It was her seventh straight win and her eighth title in the event.

On June 21, 2021, she finished tenth in the 2021 U.S. Olympic Trials 1500 meter run with a time of 4:07.76, failing to qualify for the Tokyo Olympics. This was the first time she failed to make a national team since she made the team in 2007.

== Post-retirement ==
Following her retirement from professional running in late 2024, Simpson completed a year-long, 36,000-mile "Jenny and Jason Run USA Tour" in a Winnebago motorhome with her husband, Jason, and their two Jack Russell terriers. During the tour, which covered all 50 states, they ran with local running communities and visited running stores. She was subsequently named Fleet Feet's first chief running officer. In the role, she serves as a national ambassador for the company and is responsible for refining training programs, testing products and shoe-fitting technologies, optimizing athlete partnerships and shared resources, and supporting local stores and coaches to enhance community engagement.

On June 17, 2026, Simpson was reported to be receiving medical treatment in hospital after collapsing during a Sir Walter Miler event in Raleigh, North Carolina, where she had been pacing a mile group and reportedly required CPR following a medical incident. She was taken to the nearby Duke University Medical Center, where she was placed on a ventilator for several days. Simpson was later diagnosed with arrhythmogenic right ventricular cardiomyopathy (ARVC).

== Achievements ==
=== International competitions ===
Representing the United States
Year	Competition	Venue	Position	Event	Time
2004	World Cross Country Championships	Brussels, Belgium	35th	Junior race	22:19
2005	World Cross Country Championships	Saint-Galmier, France	47th	Junior race	23:03
2007	World Championships	Osaka, Japan	7th (h)	3000 m s'chase	9:51.04
2008	Olympic Games	Beijing, China	9th	3000 m s'chase	9:22.26
2009	World Championships	Berlin, Germany	5th	3000 m s'chase	9:12.50
2011	World Championships	Daegu, South Korea	1st	1500 m	4:05.40
2012	Olympic Games	London, United Kingdom	11th (sf)	1500 m	4:06.89
2013	World Championships	Moscow, Russia	2nd	1500 m	4:02.99
2015	World Championships	Beijing, China	11th	1500 m	4:16.28
2016	Olympic Games	Rio de Janeiro, Brazil	3rd	1500 m	4:10.53
2017	World Championships	London, United Kingdom	2nd	1500 m	4:02.76
2019	World Championships	Doha, Qatar	8th	1500 m	3:58.42

=== Circuit wins and titles ===
- Diamond League 1500 metres Overall winner: 2014

1500 metres wins, other events specified in parentheses

- 2013: Monaco Herculis (SB)
- 2014: Stockholm DN Galan, Zürich Weltklasse
- 2015: Eugene Prefontaine Classic, Rome Golden Gala (WL)

=== National championships ===
Year	Competition	Venue	Position	Event	Time
2004	USATF Cross Country Championships	Indianapolis, Indiana	4th	Junior race	21:21
2005	USATF Cross Country Championships	Vancouver, Washington	3rd	Junior race	22:05.1
2007	USATF Championships	Indianapolis, Indiana	1st	3000 m s'chase	9:36.64
2008	U.S. Olympic Trials	Eugene, Oregon	3rd	3000 m s'chase	9:33.11
2009	USATF Championships	Eugene, Oregon	1st	3000 m s'chase	9:29.38
2011	USATF Indoor Championships	Albuquerque, New Mexico	1st	One mile	4:34.96
2011	USATF Indoor Championships	Albuquerque, New Mexico	1st	3000 m	9:02.20
2011	USATF Championships	Eugene, Oregon	2nd	1500 m	4:05.66
2012	USATF Indoor Championships	Albuquerque, New Mexico	1st	1500 m	4:15.04
2012	USATF Indoor Championships	Albuquerque, New Mexico	1st	3000 m	9:19.15
2012	U.S. Olympic Trials	Eugene, Oregon	3rd	1500 m	4:05.17
2013	USATF Championships	Des Moines, Iowa	1st	5000 m	15:33.77
2014	USATF Championships	Sacramento, California	1st	1500 m	4:04.96
2014	USATF Cross Country Championships	Boulder, Colorado	2nd	Senior race	27:57
2015	USATF Championships	Eugene, Oregon	1st	1500 m	4:14.86
2016	U.S. Olympic Trials	Eugene, Oregon	1st	1500 m	4:04.74
2017	USATF Championships	Sacramento, California	1st	1500 m	4:06.33
2018	USATF Championships	Des Moines, Iowa	2nd	1500 m	4:06.21
2019	USATF Championships	Des Moines, Iowa	2nd	1500 m	4:03.41
2021	U.S. Olympic Trials	Eugene, Oregon	10th	1500 m	4:07.76

=== NCAA championships ===
Representing Colorado Buffaloes
Year	Competition	Venue	Position	Event	Time
2005	NCAA Division I XC Championships	Terre Haute, Indiana	43rd	Individual race	20:36.00
2006	NCAA Division I XC Championships	Terre Haute, Indiana	2nd	Individual race	20:37.9
2006	NCAA Division I Championships	Sacramento, California	1st	3000 m s'chase	9:53.04
2007	NCAA Division I XC Championships	Terre Haute, Indiana	2nd	Individual race	19:47.8
2007	NCAA Division I Indoor Championships	Fayetteville, Arkansas	12th	3000 m	9:23.54
2007	NCAA Division I Championships	Sacramento, California	7th	3000 m s'chase	9:59.81
2008	NCAA Division I Championships	Des Moines, Iowa	1st	3000 m s'chase	9:29.20
2009	NCAA Division I XC Championships	Terre Haute, Indiana	163rd	Individual race	21:46.9
2009	NCAA Division I Championships	Fayetteville, Arkansas	1st	3000 m s'chase	9:25.54

=== Personal bests ===
Event	Time	Venue	Date
Outdoor
800 meters	2:00.45	Los Angeles, CA, United States	May 17, 2013
1500 meters	3:57.22	Paris, France	July 5, 2014
One mile	4:17.30	London, United Kingdom	July 22, 2018
3000 meters	8:29.58	Brussels, Belgium	September 5, 2014
Two miles	9:16.78 AB	Des Moines, IA, United States	April 27, 2018
5000 meters	14:56.26	Zürich, Switzerland	August 29, 2013
3000 m steeplechase	9:12.50	Berlin, Germany	August 17, 2009
Indoor
1500 meters	4:07.27	New York, NY, United States	February 11, 2012
One mile	4:25.91	College Station, TX, United States	February 28, 2009
3000 meters	8:40.31	Boston, MA, United States	February 10, 2018
Two miles	9:18.35	Boston, MA, United States	February 7, 2015
5000 meters	14:58.67	Boston, MA, United States	February 14, 2020
Road
One mile	4:38.0h	Newcastle, United Kingdom	September 15, 2012

Awards
Preceded by ---	The Bowerman (Women's Winner); 2009	Succeeded by (United States) Queen Harrison
Preceded by Brianna Rollins	Jackie Joyner Kersee Award (Women's Winner); 2014	Succeeded by (United States) ---
