= Fifth Avenue Mile =

Road race

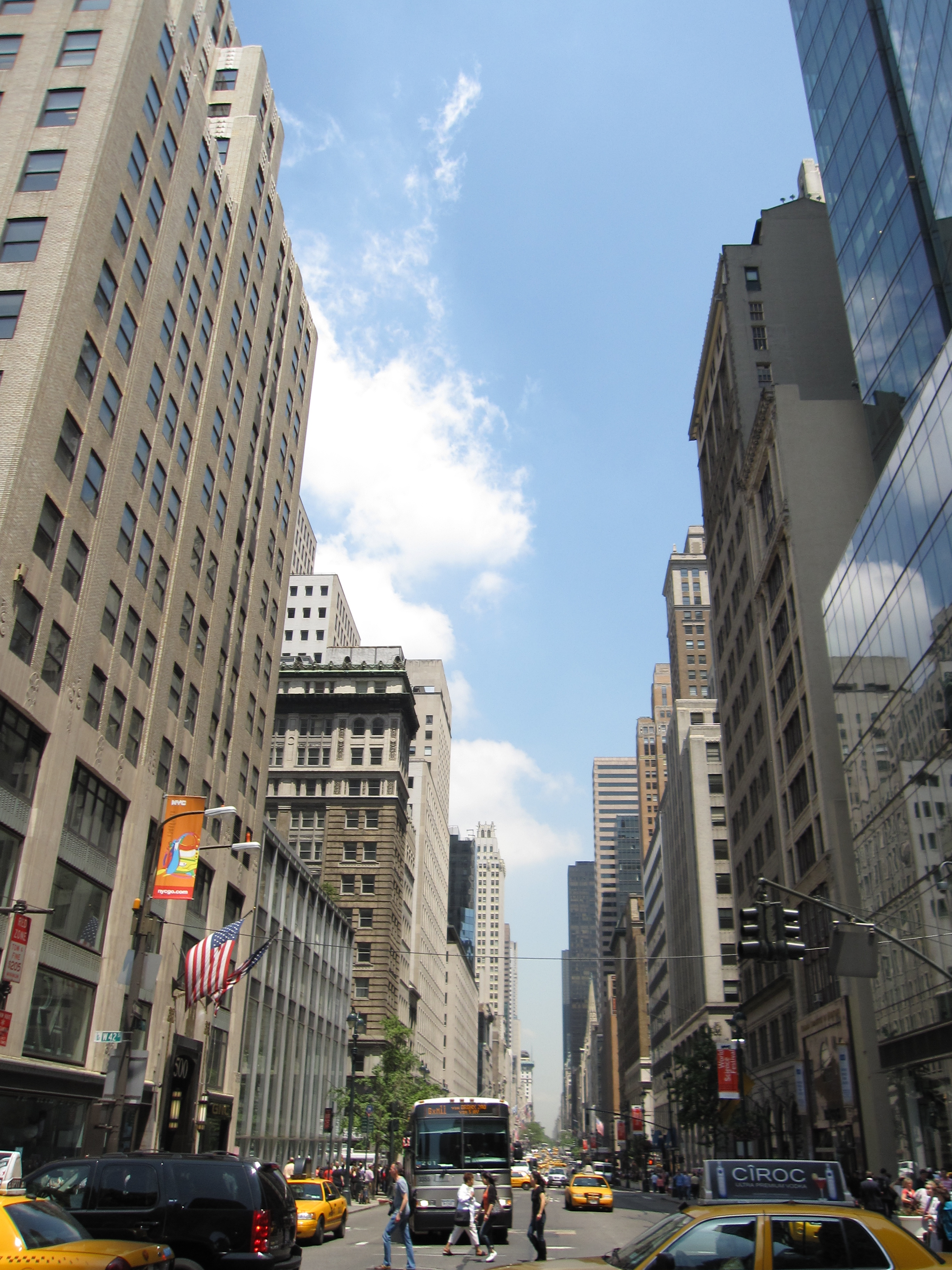
- Fifth Avenue, looking north from 42nd Street
- Date: Mid-September
- Location: New York City
- Event type: Road
- Distance: Mile run
- Primary sponsor: New Balance since 2016
- Established: 1981; 45 years ago
- Course records: Men: (United Kingdom) Josh Kerr 3:44.3 (2024); Women: (United Kingdom) Jemma Reekie 4:13.8 (2026)
- Website: Fifth Avenue Mile

The Fifth Avenue Mile is an annual 1 mile (1.6 km) road race on Fifth Avenue in New York City, United States. The race begins at 80th Street and heads twenty blocks south to 60th Street. First held on September 26, 1981, the race is currently organized by New York Road Runners. The competition regularly attracts world-class runners, who compete in special heats after the regular age division heats. The Fifth Avenue Mile has also inspired similar events in the same mould, including the Anlene Orchard Mile in Singapore.

Jennifer Simpson of the United States has historically been the most successful athlete at the competition, having won 8 races. The winners at the most recent edition in 2025 were Yared Nuguse and Gracie Morris, which was the first United States double since 2016. In 2023, Kerr and Jemma Reekie won, which was the third Scottish double in succession after the 2022 victories of Jake Wightman and Laura Muir, and this of Wightman and Reekie, who won the event in 2021.

The men's record in the race is 3:44.3 set by Josh Kerr in 2024. Prior to Kerr's performance, Sydney Maree held the course record at 3:47.52 for 43 years, since the inaugural edition of the race in 1981. The women's record is 4:14.8, set by Laura Muir in 2022, which was tied by Karissa Schweizer in 2024.

The Fifth Avenue Mile was originally held in late September or early October. In 2014 it was moved to mid September near Patriot Day. The race has been sponsored by Pepsi (1981), Mercedes-Benz (1986–1991), Discover Card (1994–1996), Donald Trump (1997–1998), Continental Airlines (2005–2010) and currently New Balance (since 2016).

Although World Athletics recognises a road mile world record, the Fifth Avenue Mile is a point-to-point course, and is also too steep, meaning times recorded on the course cannot be ratified as a road mile world record.

== Winners ==
Key: Course record

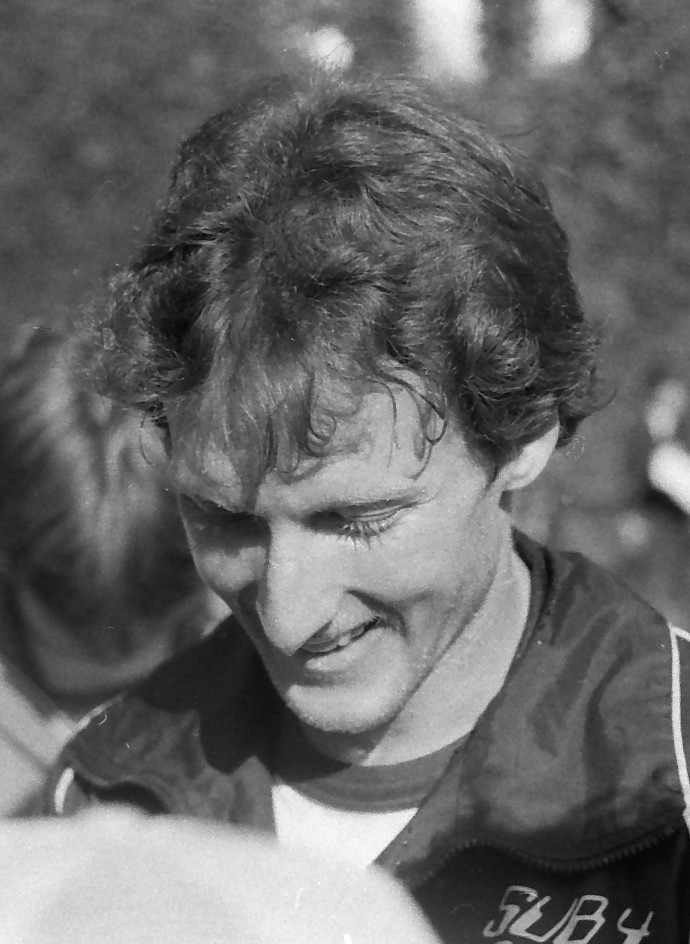
Steve Scott, a former American mile record holder, is a two-time winner.

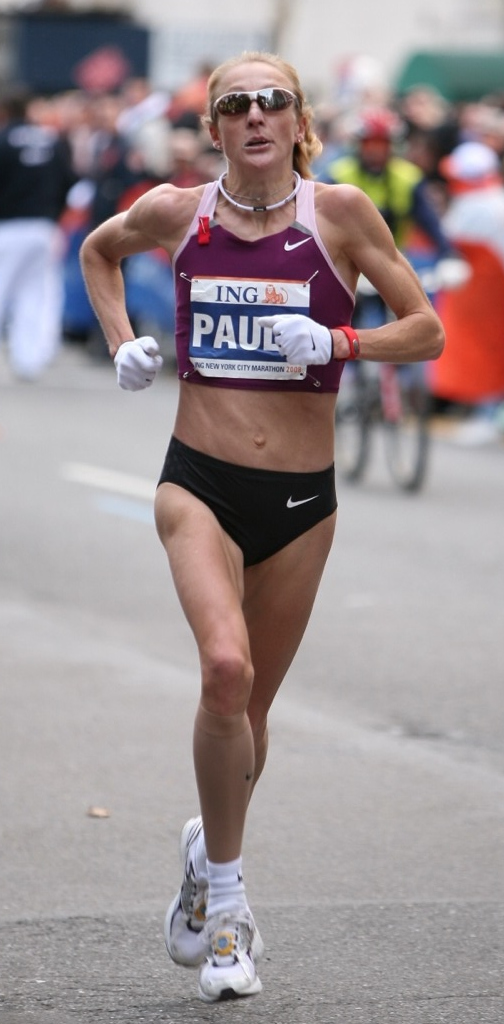
Britain's Paula Radcliffe had back-to-back wins in 1996 and 1997.

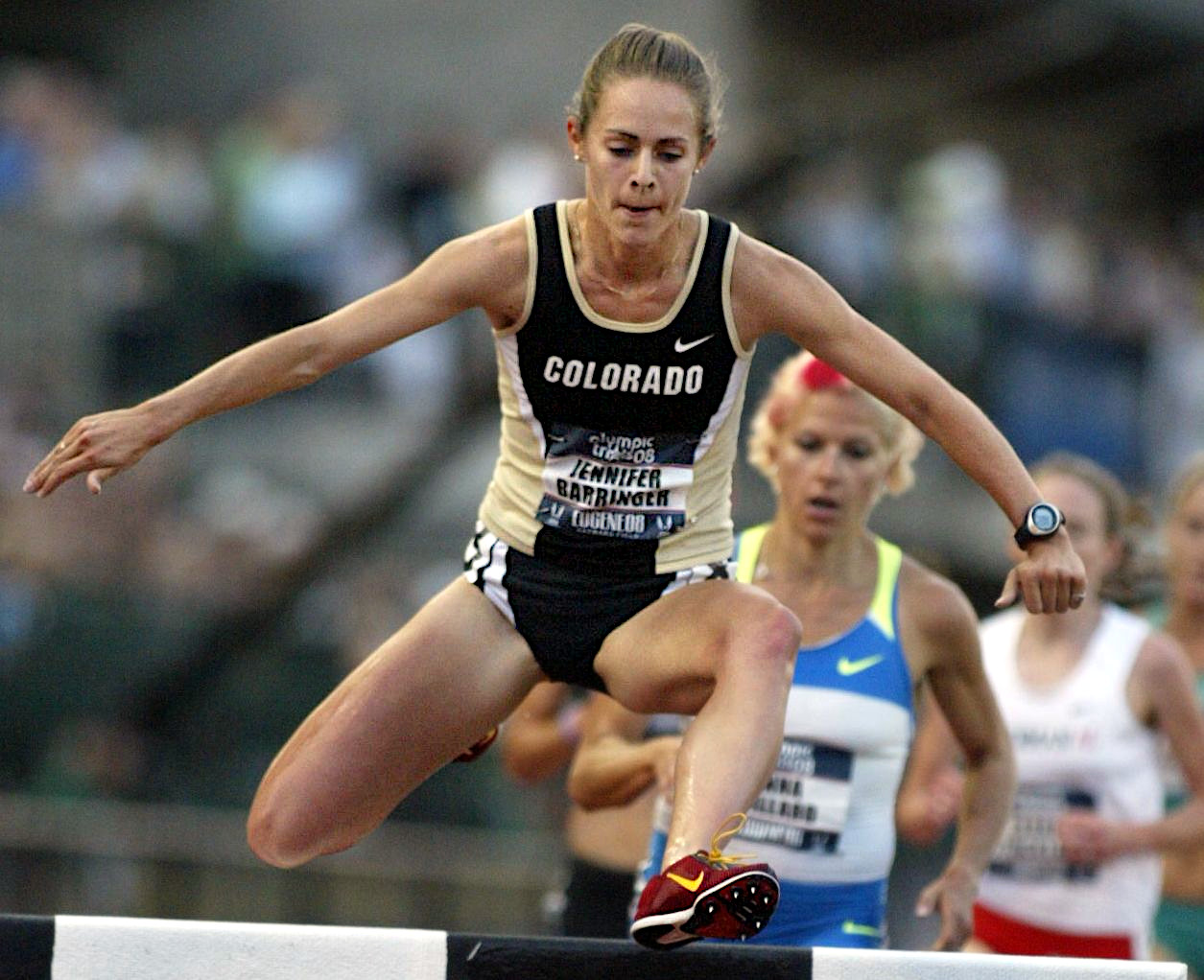
Jennifer Simpson won the 2011 race after becoming the 2011 World Champion over 1500 m.

Year	Men's winner	Nationality	Time (m:s)	Women's winner	Nationality	Time (m:s)
1981	Sydney Maree	United States	3:47.52	Leann Warren	United States	4:25.31
1982	Tom Byers	United States	3:51.35	Debbie Scott	Canada	4:23.96
1983	Steve Scott	United States	3:49.77	Wendy Sly	Great Britain	4:22.66
1984	John Walker	New Zealand	3:53.62	Maricica Puică	Romania	4:24.35
1985	Frank O'Mara	Ireland	3:52.28	Lynn Williams	Canada	4:25.03
1986	José Luis González	Spain	3:53.52	Maricica Puică	Romania	4:19.48
1987	Peter Elliott	Great Britain	3:53.52	Kirsty Wade	Great Britain	4:22.70
1988	Steve Scott	United States	3:53.43	Mary Slaney	United States	4:20.03
1989	Peter Elliott	Great Britain	3:52.95	Paula Ivan	Romania	4:28.25
1990	Peter Elliott	Great Britain	3:47.83	PattiSue Plumer	United States	4:16.68
1991	Matthew Yates	Great Britain	3:56.75	Alisa Hill	United States	4:31.57
1992	Itamar Da Silva	Brazil	4:00.37	Alicia Kelly	United States	4:43.07
1993	Ron Harris	United States	3:58.0	Lauren Gubicza	United States	4:37.9
1994	Jason Pyrah	United States	3:52.3	Regina Jacobs	United States	4:27.8
1995	Isaac Viciosa	Spain	3:47.8	Sinéad Delahunty	Ireland	4:25.2
1996	Isaac Viciosa	Spain	3:53.67	Paula Radcliffe	Great Britain	4:26.69
1997	Isaac Viciosa	Spain	3:53.66	Paula Radcliffe	Great Britain	4:22.96
1998	Isaac Viciosa	Spain	3:55.59	Regina Jacobs	United States	4:20.8
1999	Ben Kapsoiya	Kenya	4:05.4	Alisa Hill	United States	4:41.3
2000	Jason Lunn	United States	4:03.9	Kim McGreevy	United States	4:38.9
2001	John Itati	Kenya	4:02.3	Kim McGreevy	United States	4:39.8
2002	Leonard Mucheru	Kenya	3:55.2	Grace Njoki	Kenya	4:37.7
2003	John Itati	Kenya	3:56	Theresa Du Toit	South Africa	4:53
2004	Elarbi Khattabi	Morocco	4:10	Andrea Haver	United States	4:51
2005	Craig Mottram	Australia	3:49.9	Carmen Douma-Hussar	Canada	4:28.0
2006	Kevin Sullivan	Canada	3:54.1	Sara Hall	United States	4:28.0
2007	Alan Webb	United States	3:52.7	Carmen Douma-Hussar	Canada	4:22.8
2008	Nick Willis	New Zealand	3:50.5	Lisa Dobriskey	Great Britain	4:18.6
2009	Andrew Baddeley	Great Britain	3:51.8	Shannon Rowbury	United States	4:23.3
2010	Amine Laalou	Morocco	3:52.83	Shannon Rowbury	United States	4:24.12
2011	Bernard Lagat	United States	3:50.50	Jennifer Simpson	United States	4:22.3
2012	Matthew Centrowitz	United States	3:52.4	Brenda Martinez	United States	4:24.2
2013	Nick Willis	New Zealand	3:52.1	Jennifer Simpson	United States	4:19.3
2014	Jordan McNamara	United States	3:51.0	Jennifer Simpson	United States	4:19.4
2015	Nick Willis	New Zealand	3:54.8	Jennifer Simpson	United States	4:29.0
2016	Eric Jenkins	United States	3:49.5	Jennifer Simpson	United States	4:18.3
2017	Nick Willis	New Zealand	3:51.3	Jennifer Simpson	United States	4:16.6
2018	Jake Wightman	Great Britain	3:53.5	Jennifer Simpson	United States	4:18.8
2019	Nick Willis	New Zealand	3:51.7	Jennifer Simpson	United States	4:16.1
2020	New York race cancelled, only virtual race with Strava (COVID-19 pandemic in the United States)					
2021	Jake Wightman	Great Britain	3:49.5	Jemma Reekie	Great Britain	4:21.6
2022	Jake Wightman	Great Britain	3:49.6	Laura Muir	Great Britain	4:14.8
2023	Josh Kerr	Great Britain	3:47.9	Jemma Reekie	Great Britain	4:19.4
2024	Josh Kerr	Great Britain	3:44.3	Karissa Schweizer	United States	4:14.8
2025	Yared Nuguse	United States	3:47.7	Gracie Morris	United States	4:15.5
2026	Marco Langon	United States	3:45.0	Jemma Reekie	United Kingdom	4:13.8

== See also ==
- New York City Marathon
- New York City Half Marathon
