= Gamze Bulut =

Turkish middle-distance runner (born 1992)

Personal information
- Nationality: Turkey
- Born: 3 August 1992 (age 34) Eskişehir, Turkey
- Height: 166 cm (5 ft 5 in)
- Weight: 48 kg (106 lb)

Sport
- Sport: Middle-distance running
- Club: Fenerbahçe Athletics
- Coached by: Süleyman Altınoluk
Medal record
Women's athletics
Representing Turkey
Olympic Games
| Disqualified | 2012 London | 1500 m |
European Championships
| Disqualified | 2012 Helsinki | 1500 m |
European U23 Championships
| Disqualified | 2013 Tampere | 5000 m |

Gamze Bulut (pronounced [ˈɡamze ˈbuɫut]; born 3 August 1992 in Eskişehir) is a Turkish middle-distance runner.

Due to receive the 2012 gold medals as Olympic and European champion following the disqualification of teammate Aslı Çakır Alptekin from both events, Bulut herself came under investigation for abnormalities in her athlete 'passport', and on 1 June 2016, Turkish media reported that Bulut had also been found to have employed illegal performance enhancing methods by dint of observations of her athlete 'passport'. This was confirmed by the IAAF and Bulut lost her Olympic and European medals, and all medals and records from the date of the infraction, 20 July 2011 to 2016. She received a four-year ban until 29 May 2020.

The 166 cm (5 ft 5 in) tall athlete at 48 kg (106 lb) was a member of Fenerbahçe Athletics, where she was coached by Süleyman Altınoluk.

== Career ==
At the 2009 European Youth Summer Olympic Festival in Tampere, Finland, she became bronze medalist in the 2000 m steeplechase event with a time of 6:50.24. She won the gold medal of the 3000 m steeplechase event at the 2009 Balkan Junior Athletics Championships held in Greece.

Bulut also lost the silver medal in the 1500 metres from the 2012 European Athletics Championships in Helsinki, Finland, when finishing second behind her compatriot Aslı Çakır Alptekin.

She took second place and the silver medal in 1500 m at the 2012 Summer Olympics in London, again finishing behind Alptekin. Bulut had set a personal best time of 4:01:18 in the semi-finals of the competition. Alptekin's results from 2010 onwards were subsequently stripped due to doping offences, making Bulut the de facto Olympic and European champion. However, in March 2016, it was reported that Bulut too was also under investigation for suspected doping. Bulut subsequently received a four-year ban in 2017 backdated to 2011 with all her results from 2011 to 2016 disqualified.

When the 5000 metres event at the 9th European Athletics U23 Championships was held in Tampere, Bulut won the gold medal setting a personal best time with 15:45.03. However, following her doping ban in 2017 all her results backdated to 2011 were disqualified, including this performance.

Bulut returned to athletics competition in 2021 almost entirely in events run in Turkey.

== International competitions ==
| Year | Competition | Venue | Position | Event | Notes |
|---|---|---|---|---|---|
| 2009 | European Youth Summer Olympic Festival | Tampere, Finland | 3rd | 2000m sc | 6:50.24 |
| 2009 | Balkan Junior Athletics Championships | Schimatari, Greece | 1st | 3000m sc | 10:57.26 |
