= Chancel Ilunga Sankuru =

Congolese middle-distance runner

Chancel Ilunga Sankuru (born 28 December 1995 in Lubumbashi) is a Congolese middle-distance runner. At the 2012 Summer Olympics, she competed in the Women's 1500 metres.
