= Aslı Çakır Alptekin =

Turkish middle-distance runner (born 1985)

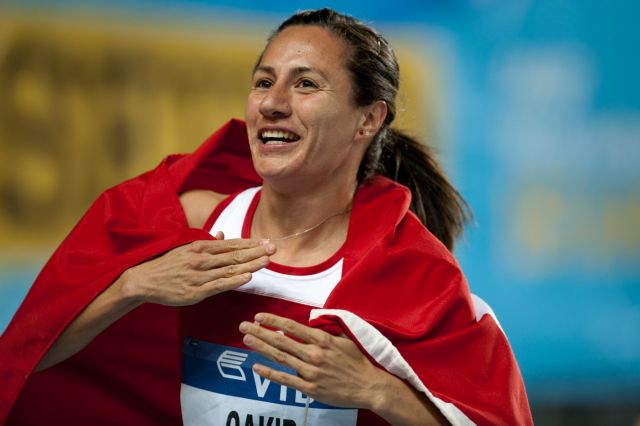
- Aslı Çakır Alptekin during the 2012 IAAF World Indoor Championships in Istanbul

Personal information
- Nationality: Turkey
- Born: Aslı Çakır; 20 August 1985 (age 40) Antalya; Turkey
- Height: 168 cm (5 ft 6 in)
- Weight: 50 kg (110 lb)

Sport
- Sport: Middle-distance
- Club: Üsküdar Belediyespor

Achievements and titles
- Personal bests: Results after 29 July 2010 have been forfeited; 1500 m: 4:04.8 (2010); 3000 m st: 9:36.01 (2009)
Medal record
Women's athletics
Representing Turkey
Olympic Games
Disqualified	2012 London	1500 m
World Indoor Championships
Disqualified	2012 Istanbul	1500 m
Summer Universiades
Disqualified	2011 Shenzhen	1500 m
European Championships
Disqualified	2012 Helsinki	1500 m

Aslı Çakır Alptekin, née Aslı Çakır, (born 20 August 1985 in Antalya) is a Turkish former female middle-distance runner. A member of the Üsküdar Belediyespor in Istanbul, she is coached by her husband, runner Ihsan Alptekin. She was banned for life from competition in 2017 for repeated doping offenses.

== Athletics career ==
She is 168 cm (5 ft 6 in) tall and 50 kg (110 lb).

Alptekin won the gold medal in the 1500 m at the 2011 Summer Universiade held in Shenzhen, China. She also won the bronze medal in the 1500 m event at the 2012 World Indoor Championships held in Istanbul.

Both of these titles were later stripped off her upon failed doping tests.

Alptekin recorded her personal best in 1500m with 3:56.62 at the Diamond League meet in Paris on 6 July 2012. Six weeks later, she won the gold medal at the 2012 Olympics in the 1500 m event. Alptekin was also stripped of her Olympic title as a result of her use of banned substances and methods.

== Doping cases ==
Alptekin received a two-year ban from the track in September 2004 due to positive testing for illegal substances. The positive test came at the 2004 World Junior Championships, where she was the fastest in the heats of the steeplechase and placed sixth in the final.

On 22 March 2013, several news agencies reported that Alptekin was one of eight athletes who tested positive for banned substances. Alptekin faced a lifetime ban if the positive test was upheld. Neither the IAAF nor WADA officially commented on the doping allegation. On 3 December, the Turkish Athletic Federation announced that they had cleared her of the charges. The IAAF subsequently appealed the Turkish federation's decision to clear Alptekin to the Court of Arbitration for Sport and again suspended the athlete from competition.

On 17 August 2015, the Court of Arbitration for Sport says it approved a settlement agreed to by Alptekin and the IAAF. Alptekin agreed to give up her 1500 m Olympic title and serve an eight-year ban for blood doping. Alptekin forfeited all her results from 29 July 2010, including the 2012 Olympic gold and her 2012 European Championship title.

She returned that year after the ban was halved and its start date backdated to 2013, but has since reoffended.

On 23 September 2017, Alptekin was banned for life after a third doping offence. "We are never, ever going to allow doping," said Turkish Athletics Federation chief Fatih Çintimar.

== Personal life ==
Alptekin returned to the tracks in 2006, motivated by her future husband İhsan Alptekin, who gave up his athletics career early to coach her. The two married in 2011 in Aslı's hometown of Antalya.

Alptekin was a student of physical education and sports at the Dumlupınar University in Kütahya.

== International competitions ==
Year	Competition	Venue	Position	Event	Notes
Representing Turkey
2004	World Junior Championships	Grosseto, Italy	DSQ (6th)	3000 m s'chase	DSQ
2008	Summer Olympics	Beijing, China	44th (h)	3000 m s'chase	~~10:05.76~~
2009	World Championships	Berlin, Germany	41st (h)	3000 m s'chase	~~10:06.64~~
2010	European Championships	Barcelona, Spain	DSQ (5th)	1500 m	~~4:02.17~~
2011	Summer Universiade	Shenzhen, China	DSQ (1st)	1500 m	~~4:05.56~~
2012	World Indoor Championships	Istanbul, Turkey	DSQ (3rd)	1500 m	~~4:08.74 NR~~
2012	European Championships	Helsinki, Finland	DSQ (1st)	1500 m	~~4:05.31~~
2012	Summer Olympics	London, United Kingdom	DSQ (1st)	1500 m	~~4:10.23~~

== See also ==
- Turkish women in sports
