= 2005 World Championships in Athletics – Women's 1500 metres =

The women's 1500 metres at the 2005 World Championships in Athletics was held on August 12 and 14 at the Helsinki Olympic Stadium. The winning margin was 1.11 seconds.

== Medals ==
Gold:	Silver:	Bronze:
Tatyana Tomashova (Russia)	Olga Yegorova (Russia)	Bouchra Ghézielle (France)

== Results ==
All times shown are in seconds.

AR area record | CR championship record | GR games record | NR national record | OR Olympic record | PB personal best | SB season best | WL world leading (in a given season)
DNS = did not start | DQ = disqualification | NM = no mark (i.e. no valid result) | Q = qualification by place in heat | q = qualification by overall place

=== Heats ===
August 12, 2005

==== Heat 1 ====
1. (Bahrain) Maryam Yusuf Jamal 4:10.58 Q
2. (Russia) Tatyana Tomashova 4:10.74 Q
3. (Poland) Anna Jakubczak 4:11.28 Q
4. (Russia) Olga Yegorova 4:11.64 Q
5. (Spain) Natalia Rodríguez 4:11.82 Q
6. (France) Hind Déhiba 4:12.23
7. (Belarus) Alesia Turava 4:14.21
8. (Italy) Eleonora Berlanda 4:14.54
9. (Greece) Konstadina Efedaki 4:15.00
10. (Ukraine) Nelya Neporadna 4:15.46
11. (Kenya) Nancy Jebet Lagat 4:16.13
12. (United States) Treniere Clement 4:16.51
13. (Ethiopia) Mestawot Tadesse 4:20.20
- (Algeria) Nahida Touhami DNS

==== Heat 2 ====
1. (Russia) Yuliya Fomenko 4:07.26 Q
2. (Ethiopia) Gelete Burka 4:07.35 Q
3. (Russia) Yelena Soboleva 4:07.69 Q
4. (France) Bouchra Ghézielle 4:07.87 Q
5. (Canada) Carmen Douma-Hussar 4:08.73 Q
6. (Lithuania) Irina Krakoviak 4:09.11 q
7. (United Kingdom) Helen Clitheroe 4:09.13 q
8. (Poland) Wioletta Frankiewicz 4:09.90
9. (Bulgaria) Daniela Yordanova 4:11.64 (SB)
10. (Romania) Corina Dumbravean 4:12.35
11. (France) Maria Martins 4:14.12
12. (Spain) Nuria Fernández 4:14.45
13. (Finland) Johanna Lehtinen 4:15.44
14. (Norway) Trine Pilskog 4:18.63
15. (Cape Verde) Sonia Lopes 4:51.29

=== Final ===
August 14, 2005

1. (Russia) Tatyana Tomashova 4:00.35 (SB)
2. (Russia) Olga Yegorova 4:01.46
3. (France) Bouchra Ghézielle 4:02.45
4. (Russia) Yelena Soboleva 4:02.48
5. (Bahrain) Maryam Yusuf Jamal 4:02.49
6. (Spain) Natalia Rodríguez 4:03.06 (SB)
7. (Poland) Anna Jakubczak 4:03.38 (SB)
8. (Ethiopia) Gelete Burka 4:04.77 (PB)
9. (Canada) Carmen Douma-Hussar 4:05.08
10. (United Kingdom) Helen Clitheroe 4:05.19 (SB)
11. (Lithuania) Irina Krakoviak 4:08.18
- (Russia) Yuliya Fomenko DSQ
