= 1500 metres at the World Athletics Championships =

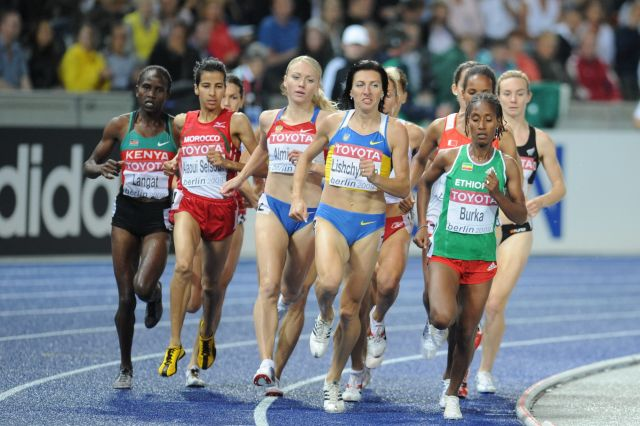
- Women racing in the 2009 semi-finals

Overview
- Gender: Men and women
- Years held: Men: 1983 – 2025; Women: 1983 – 2025

Championship record
- Men: 3:27.65 Hicham El Guerrouj (1999)
- Women: 3:51.95 Sifan Hassan (2019)

Reigning champion
- Men: Isaac Nader (POR)
- Women: Faith Kipyegon (KEN)

The 1500 metres has been contested at the World Championships in Athletics by both men and women since the inaugural edition in 1983. It is the second most prestigious title in the discipline after the 1500 metres at the Olympics. The competition format typically has two qualifying rounds leading to a final between twelve athletes. It is one of two middle-distance running events on the programme, alongside the World Championship 800 metres.

The championship records for the event are 3:27.65 minute for men, set by Hicham El Guerrouj in 1999, and 3:51.95 minutes for women, set by Sifan Hassan in 2019. The world record has never been broken or equalled at the competition by either men or women, reflecting the lack of pacemaking and athletes' more tactical approach to championship races.

Hicham El Guerrouj of Morocco is the most successful athlete of the event through his four straight wins from 1997 to 2003, as well as a silver in 1995. The next most successful athlete is Faith Kipyegon, who, in addition to three golds, also has won two silvers between 2015 in 2023, making her the most decorated athlete in terms of overall medals.

Rashid Ramzi is the only athlete to have won both middle-distance titles, having done an 800 m/1500 m double at the 2005 World Championships in Athletics. The first two women's champions Mary Decker and Tatyana Dorovskikh both completed 1500 m/3000 m World Championships doubles, while Bernard Lagat and Faith Kipyegon completed a 1500 m/5000 metres double at respectively the 2007 World Championships and 2023 World Championships. Sifan Hassan is the only athlete to win the 1500 m and the 10000 m in a single championships, doing so in 2019.

British runners Steve Cram, the inaugural men's winner, 2022 champion Jake Wightman and 2023 champion Josh Kerr are the only non-African-born men to win the World Championship event.

Kenya is the most successful nation in the discipline, having won ten gold medals across the men's and women's event. Algeria is next, with five gold medals across the men's and women's event. Morocco and Bahrain each have won four gold medals, while Russia and the United States each have three. The United States has the highest total of medals in the events at twelve, with six in both in the men's and women's divisions. Kenya has the highest number of medals in the men's event, with a total of seven.

Two medallists have been stripped of their honours in the event due to doping: 1987 bronze medallist Sandra Gasser and 2007 silver medallist Yelena Soboleva.

== Age records ==
- All information from World Athletics.

Distinction	Male			Female		
Distinction	Athlete	Age	Date	Athlete	Age	Date
Youngest champion	Noureddine Morceli (ALG)	21 years, 185 days	1 Sep 1991	Liu Dong (CHN)	19 years, 241 days	22 Aug 1993
Youngest medalist	Noah Ngeny (KEN)	20 years, 295 days	24 Aug 1999	Anita Weyermann (SUI)	19 years, 240 days	5 Aug 1997
Youngest finalist	Asbel Kiprop (KEN)	18 years, 60 days	29 Aug 2007	Mary Cain (USA)	18 years, 224 days	15 Aug 2013
Youngest participant	Yahye Abdi Gurre (SOM)	16 years, 234 days^{[nb1]}	23 Aug 2003	Lamberte Nyabamikazi (BDI)	14 years, 217 days	4 Aug 2001
Oldest champion	Bernard Lagat (USA)	32 years, 260 days	4 Sep 2007	Svetlana Masterkova (RUS)	31 years, 224 days	29 Aug 1999
Oldest medalist	Bernard Lagat (USA)	34 years, 250 days	19 Aug 2009	Violeta Szekely (ROU)	36 years, 134 days	7 Aug 2001
Oldest finalist	Bernard Lagat (USA)	34 years, 250 days	19 Aug 2009	Tatyana Tomashova (RUS)	40 years, 55 days	25 Aug 2015
Oldest participant	Joseph Chesire (KEN)	35 years, 281 days	20 Aug 1993	Tatyana Tomashova (RUS)	40 years, 55 days	25 Aug 2015

^{nb} The exact date of birth of the youngest male participant, Yahye Abdi Gurre, is unknown but he remains the youngest given his known year of birth and calculating from 1 January of that year.

== Doping ==
The 1500 m was the event that first saw the disqualification of a World Championships medallist on the grounds of doping. The 1987 women's bronze medallist Sandra Gasser gave a positive test for anabolic steroids at the competition and received a two-year ban from the sport later that month. Twelve years passed without incident in the event, until the disqualification of the first male 1500 m athlete in 1999: Ibrahim Mohamed Aden was disqualified and given a public warning for ephedrine usage due to failing his post-race test after the semi-finals.

The 2003 men's finalist Fouad Chouki was banned for two-years after a positive test for EPO. Chouki lost an appeal at the Court of Arbitration for Sport in which he claimed that an unknown person had injected him with EPO in the aftermath of the race. Regina Jacobs (a two-time silver medallist) had her 2003 semi-final performance annulled retrospectively following the BALCO scandal, as later analysis of her sample at the 2003 USA Outdoor Track and Field Championships showed usage of the novel steroid THG.

The women's World Championships 1500 m was affected by doping for three straight editions starting from 2007. Russia's Yelena Soboleva became the second athlete to be stripped of a 1500 m medal after she was banned for her involvement in a doping test manipulation scheme, alongside 2007 finalist Yuliya Fomenko and two-time world champion Tatyana Tomashova (who did not compete in 2007 and whose gold medals from 2003 and 2005 still stand). In 2009 Mariem Alaoui Selsouli withdrew from the final after a sample given earlier that year tested positive for EPO while heats runner Alemitu Bekele Degfa was banned due to biological passport abnormalities. Ukrainian duo Anzhelika Shevchenko and Nataliya Tobias had their 2011 results annulled while Olesya Syreva became the third Russian 1500 m to be disqualified for doping.

Bernard Lagat, the men's gold medallist in 2007, had a positive "A" sample test for EPO prior to the 2003 World Championships which was disregarded after the "B" sample (taken at the same time) returned a negative result. He was temporarily banned in the interim period of testing and missed the world championships as a result, having been runner-up two years earlier. Lagat and medical advisor Hans Heid were critical of the testing procedure for EPO and advocated the dropping of the technique until more reliable methods were found.

Outside of the competition, the 2005 men's champion Rashid Ramzi was banned for doping after winning at the 2008 Beijing Olympics. Inaugural women's champion Mary Decker was banned for doping later in her career, as were 2003 and 2005 runners-up Süreyya Ayhan and Olga Yegorova.

== Medalists ==
=== Men ===
Championships	Gold	Silver	Bronze
1983 Helsinki	Steve Cram (GBR)	Steve Scott (USA)	Saïd Aouita (MAR)
1987 Rome	Abdi Bile (SOM)	José Luis González (ESP)	Jim Spivey (USA)
1991 Tokyo	Noureddine Morceli (ALG)	Wilfred Kirochi (KEN)	Hauke Fuhlbrügge (GER)
1993 Stuttgart	Noureddine Morceli (ALG)	Fermín Cacho (ESP)	Abdi Bile (SOM)
1995 Gothenburg	Noureddine Morceli (ALG)	Hicham El Guerrouj (MAR)	Vénuste Niyongabo (BDI)
1997 Athens	Hicham El Guerrouj (MAR)	Fermín Cacho (ESP)	Reyes Estévez (ESP)
1999 Seville	Hicham El Guerrouj (MAR)	Noah Ngeny (KEN)	Reyes Estévez (ESP)
2001 Edmonton	Hicham El Guerrouj (MAR)	Bernard Lagat (KEN)	Driss Maazouzi (FRA)
2003 Saint-Denis	Hicham El Guerrouj (MAR)	Mehdi Baala (FRA)	Ivan Heshko (UKR)
2005 Helsinki	Rashid Ramzi (BHR)	Adil Kaouch (MAR)	Rui Silva (POR)
2007 Osaka	Bernard Lagat (USA)	Rashid Ramzi (BHR)	Shedrack Kibet Korir (KEN)
2009 Berlin	Yusuf Saad Kamel (BHR)	Deresse Mekonnen (ETH)	Bernard Lagat (USA)
2011 Daegu	Asbel Kiprop (KEN)	Silas Kiplagat (KEN)	Matthew Centrowitz (USA)
2013 Moscow	Asbel Kiprop (KEN)	Matthew Centrowitz (USA)	Johan Cronje (RSA)
2015 Beijing	Asbel Kiprop (KEN)	Elijah Manangoi (KEN)	Abdalaati Iguider (MAR)
2017 London	Elijah Manangoi (KEN)	Timothy Cheruiyot (KEN)	Filip Ingebrigtsen (NOR)
2019 Doha	Timothy Cheruiyot (KEN)	Taoufik Makhloufi (ALG)	Marcin Lewandowski (POL)
2022 Eugene	Jake Wightman (GBR)	Jakob Ingebrigtsen (NOR)	Mohamed Katir (ESP)
2023 Budapest	Josh Kerr (GBR)	Jakob Ingebrigtsen (NOR)	Narve Gilje Nordås (NOR)
2025 Tokyo	Isaac Nader (POR)	Jake Wightman (GBR)	Reynold Cheruiyot (KEN)

==== Medalists by country ====
Rank	Nation	Gold	Silver	Bronze	Total
1	Kenya (KEN)	5	6	2	13
2	Morocco (MAR)	4	2	2	8
3	Algeria (ALG)	3	1	0	4
3	Great Britain (GBR)	3	1	0	4
5	Bahrain (BHR)	2	1	0	3
6	United States (USA)	1	2	3	6
7	Somalia (SOM)	1	0	1	2
7	Portugal (POR)	1	0	1	2
9	Spain (ESP)	0	3	3	6
10	Norway (NOR)	0	2	2	4
11	France (FRA)	0	1	1	2
12	Ethiopia (ETH)	0	1	0	1
13	Burundi (BDI)	0	0	1	1
13	Germany (GER)	0	0	1	1
13	Poland (POL)	0	0	1	1
13	South Africa (RSA)	0	0	1	1
13	Ukraine (UKR)	0	0	1	1

==== Multiple medalists ====
Rank	Athlete	Nation	Period	Gold	Silver	Bronze	Total
1	Hicham El Guerrouj	Morocco (MAR)	1995–2003	4	1	0	5
2	Noureddine Morceli	Algeria (ALG)	1991–1995	3	0	0	3
2	Asbel Kiprop	Kenya (KEN)	2011–2015	3	0	0	3
4	Bernard Lagat	Kenya (KEN) (2001 only); United States (USA)	2001–2009	1	1	1	3
5	Rashid Ramzi	Bahrain (BHR)	2005–2007	1	1	0	2
5	Elijah Manangoi	Kenya (KEN)	2015-2017	1	1	0	2
5	Timothy Cheruiyot	Kenya (KEN)	2017-2019	1	1	0	2
8	Jake Wightman	Great Britain (GBR)	2022-2025	1	1	0	2
9	Abdi Bile	Somalia (SOM)	1987–1993	1	0	1	2
10	Jakob Ingebrigtsen	Norway (NOR)	2022-2023	0	2	0	2
10	Fermín Cacho	Spain (ESP)	1993–1997	0	2	0	2
12	Matthew Centrowitz, Jr.	United States (USA)	2011–2013	0	1	1	2
13	Reyes Estévez	Spain (ESP)	1997–1999	0	0	2	2

=== Women ===
Championships	Gold	Silver	Bronze
1983 Helsinki	Mary Decker (USA)	Zamira Zaytseva (URS)	Yekaterina Podkopayeva (URS)
1987 Rome	Tetyana Samolenko (URS)	Hildegard Körner (GDR)	Doina Melinte (ROU)
1991 Tokyo	Hassiba Boulmerka (ALG)	Tetyana Dorovskikh (URS)	Lyudmila Rogachova (URS)
1993 Stuttgart	Liu Dong (CHN)	Sonia O'Sullivan (IRL)	Hassiba Boulmerka (ALG)
1995 Gothenburg	Hassiba Boulmerka (ALG)	Kelly Holmes (GBR)	Carla Sacramento (POR)
1997 Athens	Carla Sacramento (POR)	Regina Jacobs (USA)	Anita Weyermann (SUI)
1999 Seville	Svetlana Masterkova (RUS)	Regina Jacobs (USA)	Kutre Dulecha (ETH)
2001 Edmonton	Gabriela Szabo (ROU)	Violeta Szekely (ROU)	Natalya Gorelova (RUS)
2003 Saint-Denis	Tatyana Tomashova (RUS)	Süreyya Ayhan (TUR)	Hayley Tullett (GBR)
2005 Helsinki	Tatyana Tomashova (RUS)	Olga Yegorova (RUS)	Bouchra Ghezielle (FRA)
2007 Osaka	Maryam Yusuf Jamal (BHR)	Iryna Lishchynska (UKR)	Daniela Yordanova (BUL)
2009 Berlin	Maryam Yusuf Jamal (BHR)	Lisa Dobriskey (GBR)	Shannon Rowbury (USA)
2011 Daegu	Jennifer Simpson (USA)	Hannah England (GBR)	Natalia Rodríguez (ESP)
2013 Moscow	Abeba Aregawi (SWE)	Jennifer Simpson (USA)	Hellen Obiri (KEN)
2015 Beijing	Genzebe Dibaba (ETH)	Faith Kipyegon (KEN)	Sifan Hassan (NED)
2017 London	Faith Kipyegon (KEN)	Jennifer Simpson (USA)	Caster Semenya (RSA)
2019 Doha	Sifan Hassan (NED)	Faith Kipyegon (KEN)	Gudaf Tsegay (ETH)
2022 Eugene	Faith Kipyegon (KEN)	Gudaf Tsegay (ETH)	Laura Muir (GBR)
2023 Budapest	Faith Kipyegon (KEN)	Diribe Welteji (ETH)	Sifan Hassan (NED)
2025 Tokyo	Faith Kipyegon (KEN)	Dorcas Ewoi (KEN)	Jessica Hull (AUS)

==== Medalists by country ====
Rank	Nation	Gold	Silver	Bronze	Total
1	Kenya (KEN)	4	3	1	8
2	Russia (RUS)	3	1	1	5
3	United States (USA)	2	4	1	7
4	Algeria (ALG)	2	0	1	3
5	Bahrain (BHR)	2	0	0	2
7	Ethiopia (ETH)	1	2	2	5
7	Soviet Union (URS)	1	2	2	5
9	Romania (ROU)	1	1	1	3
10	Netherlands (NED)	1	0	2	3
11	Portugal (POR)	1	0	1	2
12	China (CHN)	1	0	0	1
12	Sweden (SWE)	1	0	0	1
14	Great Britain (GBR)	0	3	2	5
15	East Germany (GDR)	0	1	0	1
15	Ireland (IRL)	0	1	0	1
15	Ukraine (UKR)	0	1	0	1
15	Turkey (TUR)	0	1	0	1
19	Bulgaria (BUL)	0	0	1	1
19	France (FRA)	0	0	1	1
19	Spain (ESP)	0	0	1	1
19	Switzerland (SUI)	0	0	1	1
19	Australia (AUS)	0	0	1	1

==== Multiple medalists ====
Rank	Athlete	Nation	Period	Gold	Silver	Bronze	Total
1	Faith Kipyegon	Kenya (KEN)	2015–2025	4	2	0	6
2	Hassiba Boulmerka	Algeria (ALG)	1991–1995	2	0	1	3
3	Tatyana Tomashova	Russia (RUS)	2003–2005	2	0	0	2
3	Maryam Yusuf Jamal	Bahrain (BHR)	2007–2009	2	0	0	2
5	Jennifer Simpson	United States (USA)	2011–2017	1	2	0	3
6	Tatyana Dorovskikh	Soviet Union (URS)	1987–1991	1	1	0	2
7	Sifan Hassan	Netherlands (NED)	2015-2023	1	0	2	3
8	Carla Sacramento	Portugal (POR)	1995–1997	1	0	1	2
9	Regina Jacobs	United States (USA)	1997–1999	0	2	0	2
10	Gudaf Tsegay	Ethiopia (ETH)	2019-2022	0	1	1	2

== Championship record progression ==
=== Men ===
Men's 1500 metres World Championships record progression
Time	Athlete	Nation	Year	Round	Date
3:42.28	Pierre Délèze	Switzerland (SUI)	1983	First round	12 August
3:40.17	Steve Cram	Great Britain (GBR)	1983	First round	12 August
3:38.65	Andreas Busse	East Germany (GDR)	1983	First round	12 August
3:37.87	Steve Scott	United States (USA)	1983	First round	12 August
3:36.43	Steve Scott	United States (USA)	1983	Semi-final	13 August
3:35.77	Steve Cram	Great Britain (GBR)	1983	Semi-final	13 August
3:35.67	Abdi Bile	Somalia (SOM)	1987	Semi-final	6 September
3:32.84	Noureddine Morceli	Algeria (ALG)	1991	Final	1 September
3:27.65	Hicham El Guerrouj	Morocco (MAR)	1999	Final	24 August

=== Women ===
Women's 1500 metres World Championships record progression
Time	Athlete	Nation	Year	Round	Date
4:10.71	Ravilya Agletdinova	Soviet Union (URS)	1983	First round	12 August
4:07.47	Mary Decker	United States (USA)	1983	First round	12 August
4:00.90	Mary Decker	United States (USA)	1983	Final	14 August
3:58.56	Tatyana Samolenko	Soviet Union (URS)	1987	Final	5 September
3:58.52	Tatyana Tomashova	Russia (RUS)	2003	Final	31 August
3:51.95	Sifan Hassan	Netherlands (NED)	2019	Final	5 October

== Finishing times ==
=== Top ten fastest World Championship times ===
Fastest men's times at the World Championships
Rank	Time (sec)	Athlete	Nation	Year	Date
1	3:27.65	Hicham El Guerrouj	Morocco	1999	1999-08-24
2	3:28.73	Noah Ngeny	Kenya	1999	1999-08-24
3	3:29.23	Jake Wightman	Great Britain	2022	2022-07-19
4	3:29.26	Timothy Cheruiyot	Kenya	2019	2019-10-06
5	3:29.38	Josh Kerr	Great Britain	2023	2023-08-23
6	3:29.47	Jakob Ingebrigtsen	Norway	2022	2022-07-19
7	3:29.65	Jakob Ingebrigtsen	Norway	2023	2023-08-23
8	3:29.68	Narve Gilje Nordås	Norway	2023	2023-08-23
9	3:29.89	Abel Kipsang	Kenya	2023	2023-08-23
10	3:29.90	Mohamed Katir	Spain	2022	2022-07-19

Fastest women's times at the World Championships
Rank	Time (sec)	Athlete	Nation	Year	Date
1	3:51.95	Sifan Hassan	Netherlands	2019	2019-10-05
2	3:52.15	Faith Kipyegon	Kenya	2025	2025-09-16
3	3:52.96	Faith Kipyegon	Kenya	2022	2022-07-18
4	3:54.22	Faith Kipyegon	Kenya	2019	2019-10-05
5	3:54.38	Gudaf Tsegay	Ethiopia	2019	2019-10-05
6	3:54.52	Gudaf Tsegay	Ethiopia	2022	2022-07-18
7	3:54.87	Faith Kipyegon	Kenya	2023	2023-08-22
8	3:54.92	Dorcus Ewoi	Kenya	2025	2025-09-16
9	3:54.99	Shelby Houlihan	United States	2019	2019-10-05
10	3:55.14	Faith Kipyegon	Kenya	2023^{SF}	2023-08-20

== Bibliography ==
- Butler, Mark (2013). IAAF Statistics Book Moscow 2013 (PDF). IAAF. Archived from the original (PDF) on 12 October 2014.
