= 2006 IAAF World Indoor Championships – Women's 1500 metres =

The Women's 1500 metres event at the 2006 IAAF World Indoor Championships was held on March 11–12.

== Medalists ==
Gold	Silver	Bronze
Yuliya Fomenko; Russia	Yelena Soboleva; Russia	Maryam Yusuf Jamal; Bahrain

== Results ==
=== Heats ===
First 3 of each heat (Q) and the next 3 fastest (q) qualified for the final.

Rank	Heat	Name	Nationality	Time	Notes
1	1	Yuliya Fomenko	Russia	4:09.92	Q
2	1	Maryam Yusuf Jamal	Bahrain	4:09.93	Q
3	1	Iryna Lishchynska	Ukraine	4:10.12	Q
4	1	Hind Dehiba	France	4:10.73	q
5	1	Treniere Clement	United States	4:11.64	q
6	1	Nahida Touhami	Algeria	4:12.09	q, PB
7	1	Irina Krakoviak	Lithuania	4:14.27	
8	2	Maria Martins	France	4:14.34	Q
9	2	Yelena Soboleva	Russia	4:14.51	Q
10	2	Corina Dumbravean	Romania	4:14.76	Q
11	2	Nataliya Tobias	Ukraine	4:15.55	
12	2	Mestawot Tadesse	Ethiopia	4:15.61	SB
13	2	Tiffany McWilliams	United States	4:15.80	
14	2	Nuria Fernández	Spain	4:17.12	
15	2	Katrina Wootton	Great Britain	4:17.90	
16	2	Sonja Stolić	Serbia and Montenegro	4:19.94	PB
17	1	Sonja Roman	Slovenia	4:27.96	

=== Final ===
Rank	Name	Nationality	Time	Notes
1st place, gold medalist(s)	Yuliya Fomenko	Russia	4:04.70	
2nd place, silver medalist(s)	Yelena Soboleva	Russia	4:05.21	
3rd place, bronze medalist(s)	Maryam Yusuf Jamal	Bahrain	4:05.53	
4	Hind Dehiba	France	4:05.67	NR
5	Iryna Lishchynska	Ukraine	4:07.82	SB
6	Corina Dumbravean	Romania	4:08.29	
7	Treniere Clement	United States	4:11.21	
8	Maria Martins	France	4:15.17	
9	Nahida Touhami	Algeria	4:19.44	
