= 2005 European Athletics Indoor Championships – Women's 1500 metres =

The Women's 1500 metres event at the 2005 European Athletics Indoor Championships was held on March 4–5.

== Medalists ==
Gold	Silver	Bronze
Elena Iagăr; Romania	Corina Dumbravean; Romania	Hind Dehiba; France

== Results ==
=== Heats ===
First 3 of each heat (Q) and the next 3 fastest (q) qualified for the final.

Rank	Heat	Name	Nationality	Time	Notes
1	2	Elena Iagăr	Romania	4:10.25	Q
2	2	Anna Alminova	Russia	4:13.49	Q
3	2	Hind Dehiba	France	4:13.69	Q
4	1	Alesia Turava	Belarus	4:13.98	Q
5	1	Helen Clitheroe	Great Britain	4:13.99	Q
6	1	Corina Dumbravean	Romania	4:14.13	Q
7	2	Wioletta Janowska	Poland	4:14.25	q
8	1	Nuria Fernández	Spain	4:14.35	q
9	1	Antje Möldner	Germany	4:14.72	q
10	1	Yuliya Chizhenko	Russia	4:16.25	
11	2	Sonja Roman	Slovenia	4:16.44	
12	1	Konstadina Efedaki	Greece	4:17.01	
13	2	Carmen Rüdiger	Germany	4:17.32	
14	1	Sandra Teixeira	Portugal	4:19.11	
15	2	Oksana Zbrozhek	Russia	4:19.56	
16	1	Ljiljana Ćulibrk	Croatia	4:21.49	
17	2	Eva Arias	Spain	4:22.91	
18	2	Roisin McGettigan	Ireland	4:35.04	

=== Final ===
Rank	Name	Nationality	Time	Notes
1st place, gold medalist(s)	Elena Iagăr	Romania	4:03.09	WL
2nd place, silver medalist(s)	Corina Dumbravean	Romania	4:05.88	PB
3rd place, bronze medalist(s)	Hind Dehiba	France	4:07.20	
4	Helen Clitheroe	Great Britain	4:07.54	
5	Alesia Turava	Belarus	4:08.81	
6	Antje Möldner	Germany	4:10.83	
7	Nuria Fernández	Spain	4:12.04	
8	Anna Alminova	Russia	4:13.89	
9	Wioletta Janowska	Poland	4:15.71	
