= 1500 metres at the Olympics =

1500 metres at the Olympic Games
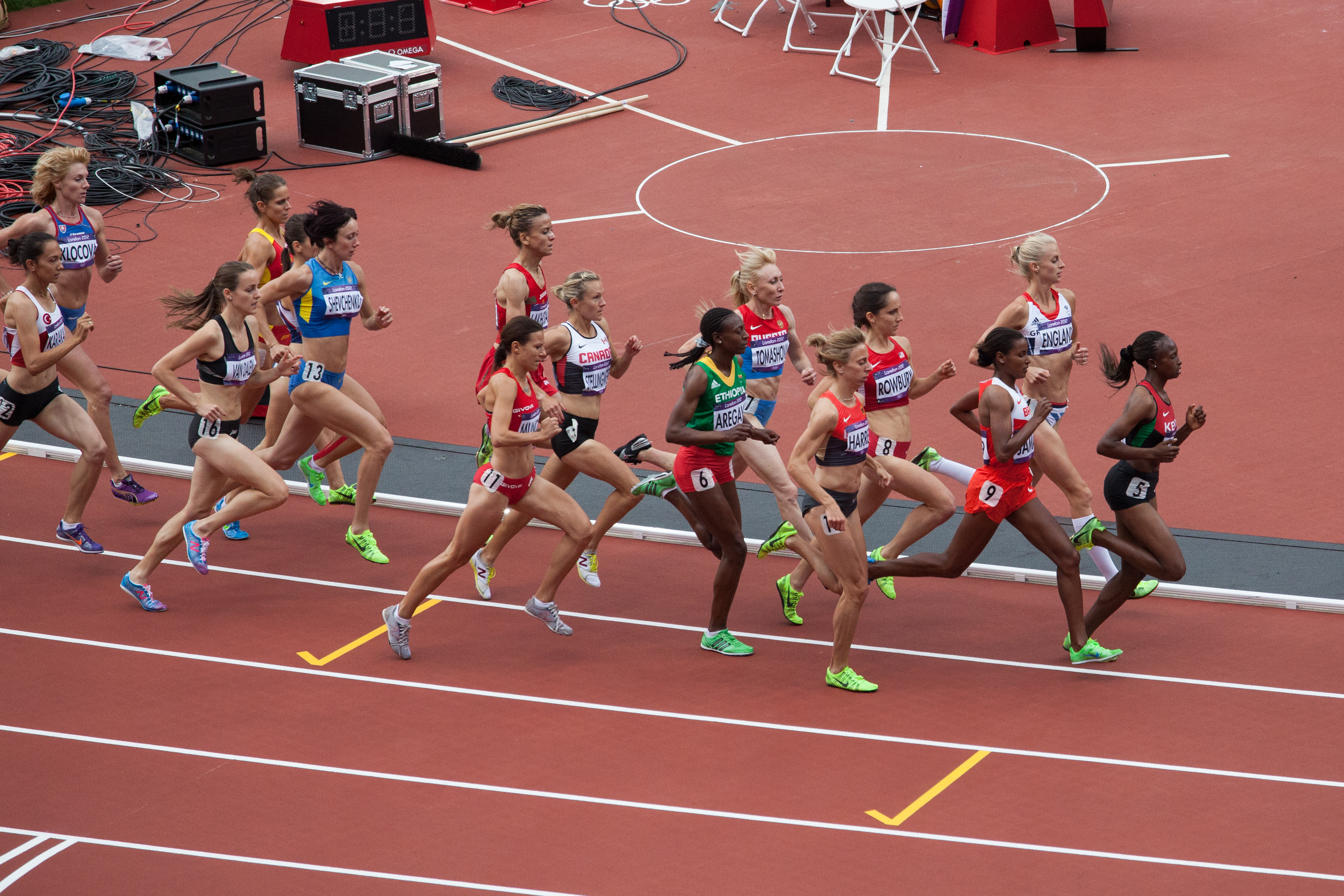
- The 2012 Olympic women's 1500 m heats

Overview
- Sport: Athletics
- Gender: Men and women
- Years held: Men: 1896–2024; Women: 1972–2024

Olympic record
- Men: Cole Hocker (USA) 3:27.65 (2024)
- Women: Faith Kipyegon (KEN) 3:51.29 (2024)

Reigning champion
- Men: Cole Hocker (USA)
- Women: Faith Kipyegon (KEN)

The 1500 metres at the Summer Olympics has been contested since the first edition of the multi-sport event. The men's 1500 m has been present on the Olympic athletics programme since 1896. The women's event was not introduced until over seventy years later, but it has been a permanent fixture since it was first held in 1972. The Olympics final and the World Athletics Championships final are the most prestigious 1500 m races at an elite level. The competition format comprises three rounds: a heats stage, semi-finals, then a final typically between twelve athletes.

The 1500 meters was one of four individual events documented exclusively by Olympic documentary filmmaker Bud Greenspan.

The Olympic records for the event are 3:27.65 minutes for men, set by Cole Hocker in Paris in 2024, and 3:51.29 minutes for women, set by Faith Kipyegon in 2024. The 1500 metres world record has been broken several times at the Olympics: the men's record was beaten in 1900, 1936, and 1960, while the women's record was improved in 1972 (three times) and in 1980.

Faith Kipyegon was the first athlete to win three times, with gold medals in 2016, 2020 and 2024. Two other athletes have defended the Olympic 1500 m title: Tatyana Kazankina became the first person to win two gold medals in the event in 1980 (repeating her 1976 win) and, soon after, Sebastian Coe became the first man to do so in 1980 and 1984. Historically, athletes in this event have also had success in the 800 metres at the Olympics. Kelly Holmes was the last athlete to win both events at the same Olympics in 2004. The 2012 1500m gold medalist Taoufik Makhloufi made both podiums without winning gold in 2016.

Kenya is the most successful nation in the event, having won seven gold medals. Great Britain has the next highest number of gold medals, with six. The United States is the only nation to have swept the medals in the event, having done so in St. Louis in 1904, albeit in a final between seven Americans and two foreigners.

== Medal summary ==
=== Men ===
Games	Gold	Silver	Bronze
1896 Athens	Edwin Flack; Australia	Arthur Blake; United States	Albin Lermusiaux; France
1900 Paris	Charles Bennett; Great Britain	Henri Deloge; France	John Bray; United States
1904 St. Louis	Jim Lightbody; United States	Frank Verner; United States	Lacey Hearn; United States
1908 London	Mel Sheppard; United States	Harold Wilson; Great Britain	Norman Hallows; Great Britain
1912 Stockholm	Arnold Jackson; Great Britain	Abel Kiviat; United States	Norman Taber; United States
1920 Antwerp	Albert Hill; Great Britain	Philip Baker; Great Britain	Lawrence Shields; United States
1924 Paris	Paavo Nurmi; Finland	Willy Schärer; Switzerland	H. B. Stallard; Great Britain
1928 Amsterdam	Harri Larva; Finland	Jules Ladoumègue; France	Eino Purje; Finland
1932 Los Angeles	Luigi Beccali; Italy	Jerry Cornes; Great Britain	Phil Edwards; Canada
1936 Berlin	Jack Lovelock; New Zealand	Glenn Cunningham; United States	Luigi Beccali; Italy
1948 London	Henry Eriksson; Sweden	Lennart Strand; Sweden	Willem Slijkhuis; Netherlands
1952 Helsinki	Josy Barthel; Luxembourg	Bob McMillen; United States	Werner Lueg; Germany
1956 Melbourne	Ron Delany; Ireland	Klaus Richtzenhain; United Team of Germany	John Landy; Australia
1960 Rome	Herb Elliott; Australia	Michel Jazy; France	István Rózsavölgyi; Hungary
1964 Tokyo	Peter Snell; New Zealand	Josef Odložil; Czechoslovakia	John Davies; New Zealand
1968 Mexico City	Kipchoge Keino; Kenya	Jim Ryun; United States	Bodo Tümmler; West Germany
1972 Munich	Pekka Vasala; Finland	Kipchoge Keino; Kenya	Rod Dixon; New Zealand
1976 Montreal	John Walker; New Zealand	Ivo Van Damme; Belgium	Paul-Heinz Wellmann; West Germany
1980 Moscow	Sebastian Coe; Great Britain	Jürgen Straub; East Germany	Steve Ovett; Great Britain
1984 Los Angeles	Sebastian Coe; Great Britain	Steve Cram; Great Britain	José Manuel Abascal; Spain
1988 Seoul	Peter Rono; Kenya	Peter Elliott; Great Britain	Jens-Peter Herold; East Germany
1992 Barcelona	Fermín Cacho; Spain	Rachid El Basir; Morocco	Mohamed Suleiman; Qatar
1996 Atlanta	Noureddine Morceli; Algeria	Fermín Cacho; Spain	Stephen Kipkorir; Kenya
2000 Sydney	Noah Ngeny; Kenya	Hicham El Guerrouj; Morocco	Bernard Lagat; Kenya
2004 Athens	Hicham El Guerrouj; Morocco	Bernard Lagat; Kenya	Rui Silva; Portugal
2008 Beijing	Asbel Kiprop; Kenya	Nick Willis; New Zealand	Mehdi Baala; France
2012 London	Taoufik Makhloufi; Algeria	Leonel Manzano; United States	Abdalaati Iguider; Morocco
2016 Rio de Janeiro	Matthew Centrowitz Jr. United States	Taoufik Makhloufi; Algeria	Nick Willis; New Zealand
2020 Tokyo	Jakob Ingebrigtsen; Norway	Timothy Cheruiyot; Kenya	Josh Kerr; Great Britain
2024 Paris	Cole Hocker; United States	Josh Kerr; Great Britain	Yared Nuguse; United States

==== Multiple medalists ====
Rank	Athlete	Nation	Olympics	Gold	Silver	Bronze	Total
1	Sebastian Coe	Great Britain	1980–1984	2	0	0	2
2	Kipchoge Keino	Kenya	1968–1972	1	1	0	2
2	Fermin Cacho	Spain	1992–1996	1	1	0	2
2	Hicham El Guerrouj	Morocco	2000–2004	1	1	0	2
2	Taoufik Makhloufi	Algeria	2012–2016	1	1	0	2
6	Luigi Beccali	Italy	1932–1936	1	0	1	2
7	Bernard Lagat	Kenya	2000–2004	0	1	1	2
7	Nick Willis	New Zealand	2008-2016	0	1	1	2
7	Josh Kerr	Great Britain	2020-2024	0	1	1	2

==== Medals by country ====
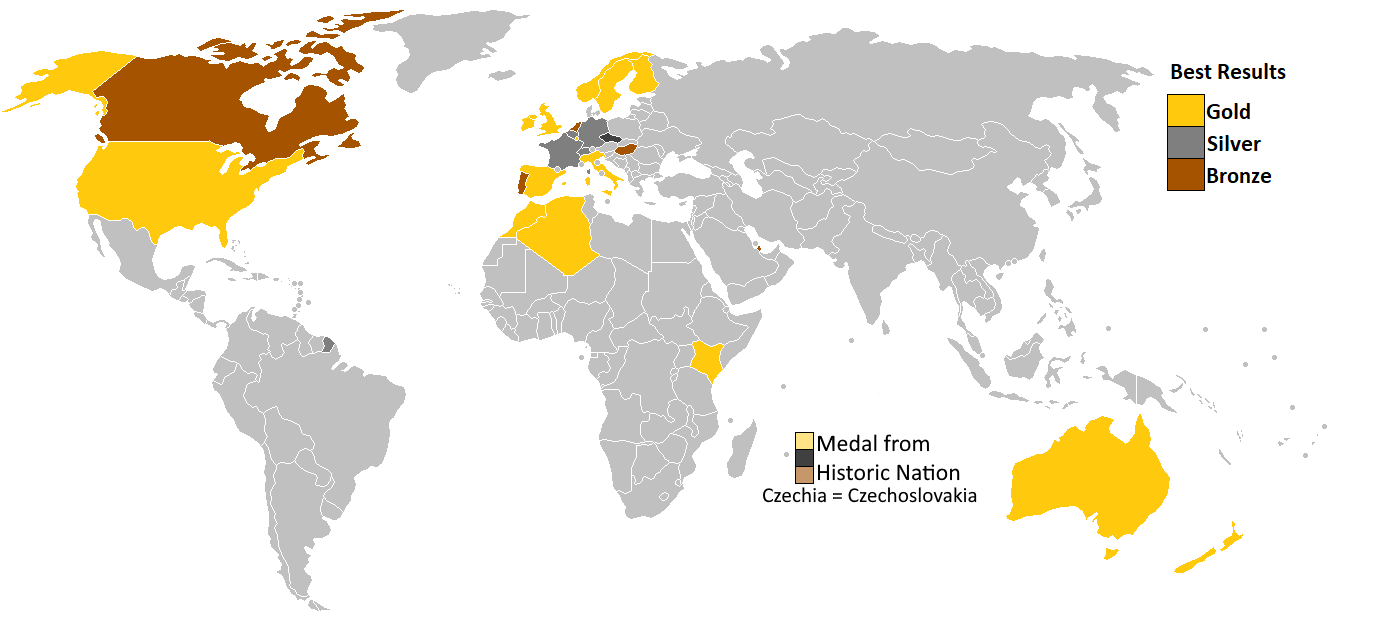
Map of countries' best results - Men's 1500 metres

Rank	Nation	Gold	Silver	Bronze	Total
1	Great Britain	5	6	4	15
2	United States	4	7	5	16
3	Kenya	4	3	2	9
4	New Zealand	3	1	3	7
5	Finland	3	0	1	4
6	Algeria	2	1	0	3
7	Australia	2	0	1	3
8	Morocco	1	2	1	4
9	Spain	1	1	1	3
10	Sweden	1	1	0	2
11	Italy	1	0	1	2
12=	Ireland	1	0	0	1
12=	Luxembourg	1	0	0	1
12=	Norway	1	0	0	1
15	France	0	3	2	5
16=	East Germany	0	1	1	2
16=	Germany^{[nb]}	0	1	1	2
18=	Belgium	0	1	0	1
18=	Czechoslovakia	0	1	0	1
18=	Switzerland	0	1	0	1
21	West Germany	0	0	2	2
22=	Canada	0	0	1	1
22=	Hungary	0	0	1	1
22=	Netherlands	0	0	1	1
22=	Portugal	0	0	1	1
22=	Qatar	0	0	1	1

- ^{nb} The German total includes teams both competing as Germany and the United Team of Germany, but not East or West Germany.

=== Women ===
Games	Gold	Silver	Bronze
1972 Munich	Lyudmila Bragina; Soviet Union	Gunhild Hoffmeister; East Germany	Paola Pigni; Italy
1976 Montreal	Tatyana Kazankina; Soviet Union	Gunhild Hoffmeister; East Germany	Ulrike Klapezynski; East Germany
1980 Moscow	Tatyana Kazankina; Soviet Union	Christiane Wartenberg; East Germany	Nadezhda Olizarenko; Soviet Union
1984 Los Angeles	Gabriella Dorio; Italy	Doina Melinte; Romania	Maricica Puică; Romania
1988 Seoul	Paula Ivan; Romania	Laimutė Baikauskaitė; Soviet Union	Tetyana Samolenko; Soviet Union
1992 Barcelona	Hassiba Boulmerka; Algeria	Lyudmila Rogachova; Unified Team	Qu Yunxia; China
1996 Atlanta	Svetlana Masterkova; Russia	Gabriela Szabo; Romania	Theresia Kiesl; Austria
2000 Sydney	Nouria Mérah-Benida; Algeria	Violeta Szekely; Romania	Gabriela Szabo; Romania
2004 Athens	Kelly Holmes; Great Britain	Tatyana Tomashova; Russia	Maria Cioncan; Romania
2008 Beijing	Nancy Langat; Kenya	Iryna Lishchynska; Ukraine	Nataliya Tobias; Ukraine
2012 London	Maryam Yusuf Jamal; Bahrain	Abeba Aregawi; Ethiopia	Shannon Rowbury; United States
2016 Rio de Janeiro	Faith Kipyegon; Kenya	Genzebe Dibaba; Ethiopia	Jennifer Simpson; United States
2020 Tokyo	Faith Kipyegon; Kenya	Laura Muir; Great Britain	Sifan Hassan; Netherlands
2024 Paris	Faith Kipyegon; Kenya	Jessica Hull; Australia	Georgia Bell; Great Britain

==== Multiple medalists ====
Rank	Athlete	Nation	Olympics	Gold	Silver	Bronze	Total
1	Faith Kipyegon	Kenya (KEN)	2016–2024	3	0	0	3
2	Tatyana Kazankina	Soviet Union	1976–1980	2	0	0	2
3	Gunhild Hoffmeister	East Germany	1972–1976	0	2	0	2
4	Gabriela Szabo	Romania	1996–2000	0	1	1	2

==== Medalists by country ====
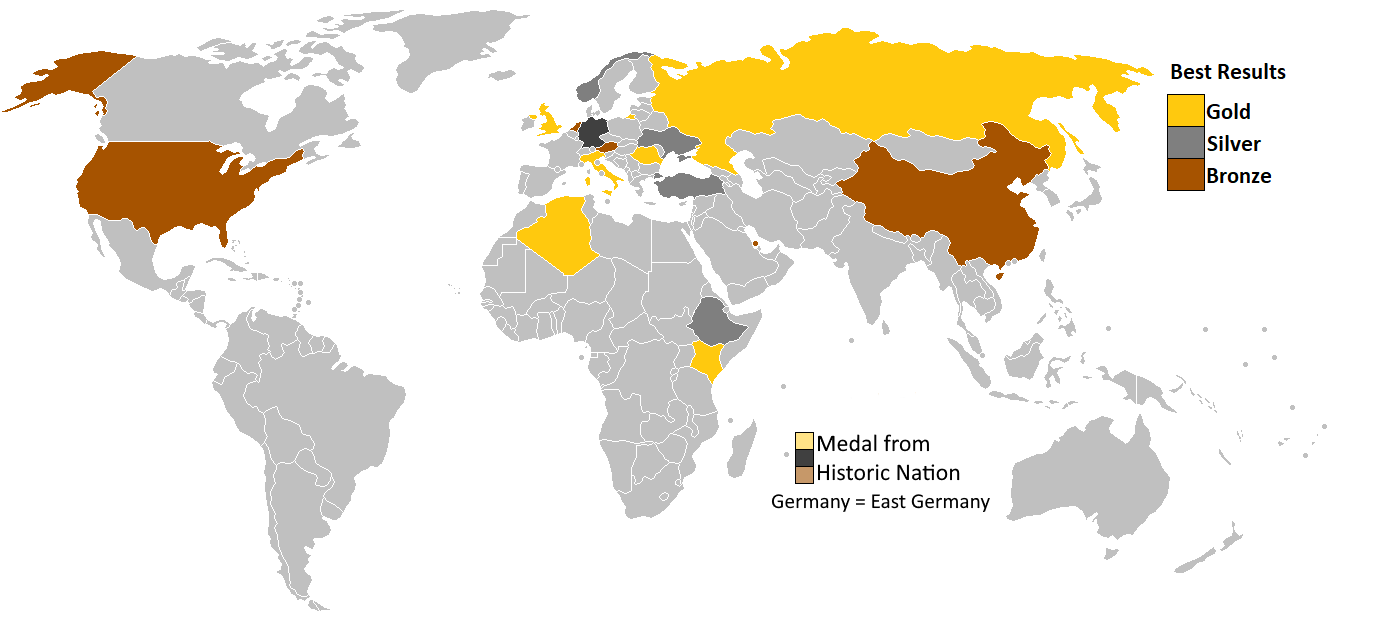
Map of countries' best results - Women's 1500 metres

Rank	Nation	Gold	Silver	Bronze	Total
1	Kenya	4	0	0	4
2	Soviet Union	3	1	2	6
3	Algeria	2	0	0	2
4	Romania	1	3	3	7
6	Russia	1	1	0	2
5	Great Britain	1	1	1	3
7	Italy	1	0	1	2
8	East Germany	0	3	1	4
9=	Ethiopia	0	1	1	2
9=	Ukraine	0	1	1	2
10	Bahrain	1	0	0	1
11=	Unified Team	0	1	0	1
11=	Australia	0	1	0	1
13=	Austria	0	0	1	1
13=	China	0	0	1	1
13=	Netherlands	0	0	1	1
13=	United States	0	0	1	1

== Intercalated Games ==
The 1906 Intercalated Games were held in Athens and at the time were officially recognised as part of the Olympic Games series, with the intention being to hold a games in Greece in two-year intervals between the internationally held Olympics. However, this plan never came to fruition and the International Olympic Committee (IOC) later decided not to recognise these games as part of the official Olympic series. Some sports historians continue to treat the results of these games as part of the Olympic canon.

At this event a men's 1500 m was held and the reigning 800 metres and 1500 m champion from the 1904 Olympics, James Lightbody, was the winner. Two 1908 Olympic participants, Britain's John McGough and Sweden's Kristian Hellström were the silver and bronze medalists.

Games	Gold	Silver	Bronze
1906 Athens	James Lightbody (USA)	John McGough (GBR)	Kristian Hellström (SWE)
