= 2007 World Championships in Athletics – Women's 1500 metres =

2007 Women's 1500m dash world championship

The women's 1500 metres at the 2007 World Championships in Athletics was held at the Nagai Stadium on 29, 31 August and 2 September.

== Medalists ==
Gold	Silver	Bronze
Maryam Yusuf Jamal; Bahrain	Iryna Lishchynska; Ukraine	Daniela Yordanova; Bulgaria

Note. The silver medal was originally won by Yelena Soboleva of Russia but she was eventually stripped off after being banned for manipulating drug samples.

== Schedule ==
Date	Time	Round
August 29, 2007	10:00	Heats
August 31, 2007	19:35	Semifinals
September 2, 2007	20:10	Final

== Results ==
KEY:	q	Fastest non-qualifiers	Q	Qualified	WR	World record	AR	Area record	NR	National record	PB	Personal best	SB	Seasonal best

=== Heats ===
Qualification: First 6 in each heat (Q) and the next 6 fastest (q) advance to the semifinals.

Rank	Heat	Name	Nationality	Time	Notes
1	1	Mariem Alaoui Selsouli	Morocco	4:09.05	Q
2	1	Maryam Yusuf Jamal	Bahrain	4:09.47	Q
3	1	Lidia Chojecka	Poland	4:09.52	Q
4	1	Iris Fuentes-Pila	Spain	4:09.58	Q
5	1	Hilary Stellingwerff	Canada	4:09.60	Q
6	1	Abby Westley	United Kingdom	4:09.67	Q
7	1	Sarah Jamieson	Australia	4:10.02	q
8	2	Iryna Lishchynska	Ukraine	4:10.03	Q
9	2	Viola Kibiwot	Kenya	4:10.53	Q
10	2	Daniela Yordanova	Bulgaria	4:10.61	Q
10	2	Lisa Dobriskey	United Kingdom	4:10.61	Q
12	1	Natalya Panteleyeva	Russia	4:10.69	q
13	3	Treniere Clement	United States	4:10.85	Q
14	2	Erin Donohue	United States	4:10.89	Q
15	3	Agnes Samaria	Namibia	4:10.96	Q
16	1	Tetyana Holovchenko	Ukraine	4:10.98	q
17	3	Veronica Nyaruai	Kenya	4:11.04	Q
17	3	Sonja Roman	Slovenia	4:11.04	Q
19	3	Lisa Corrigan	Australia	4:11.11	Q
20	3	Nataliya Tobias	Ukraine	4:11.22	q
21	2	Dolores Checa	Spain	4:11.24	q
21	3	Marina Munćan	Serbia	4:11.24	q
23	3	Bouchra Chaabi	Morocco	4:11.51	
24	3	Carmen Douma-Hussar	Canada	4:12.10	
25	3	Qing Liu	China	4:12.71	
26	2	Nahida Touhami	Algeria	4:14.38	
27	2	Cristina Vasiloiu	Romania	4:15.43	
28	2	Wioletta Frankiewicz	Poland	4:18.59	
29	1	Christin Wurth-Thomas	United States	4:20.21	
30	3	Mestawot Tadesse	Ethiopia	4:20.46	
31	2	Ragnhild Kvarberg	Norway	4:21.22	
32	1	Mika Yoshikawa	Japan	4:21.64	
33	2	Siham Hilali	Morocco	4:22.12	
34	1	Aishath Reesha	Maldives	5:45.25	
35	3	Wanumbi Kapia	Democratic Republic of the Congo	5:45.99	
-	2	Yuliya Fomenko	Russia	DSQ	*
-	3	Yelena Soboleva	Russia	DSQ	*

Note: Both Yuliya Fomenko and Yelena Soboleva originally advanced to the semifinals but were later retrospectively disqualified.

=== Semifinals ===
Qualification: First 5 in each semifinal (Q) and the next 2 fastest (q) advance to the final.

Rank	Heat	Name	Nationality	Time	Notes
1	2	Iryna Lishchynska	Ukraine	4:03.84	Q
2	2	Viola Kibiwot	Kenya	4:03.97	Q
3	2	Daniela Yordanova	Bulgaria	4:04.19	Q, SB
4	2	Mariem Alaoui Selsouli	Morocco	4:05.25	Q
5	2	Lidia Chojecka	Poland	4:05.80	q
6	2	Iris Fuentes-Pila	Spain	4:06.99	q, SB
7	2	Marina Munćan	Serbia	4:08.02	NR
8	2	Treniere Clement	United States	4:08.32	
9	2	Lisa Dobriskey	United Kingdom	4:08.39	
10	2	Sonja Roman	Slovenia	4:08.60	SB
11	2	Lisa Corrigan	Australia	4:08.79	
12	1	Maryam Yusuf Jamal	Bahrain	4:14.86	Q
13	1	Natalya Panteleyeva	Russia	4:15.22	Q
14	1	Agnes Samaria	Namibia	4:15.36	Q
15	1	Nataliya Tobias	Ukraine	4:15.43	Q
16	1	Hilary Stellingwerff	Canada	4:15.99	
17	1	Sarah Jamieson	Australia	4:16.20	
18	1	Abby Westley	United Kingdom	4:16.21	
19	1	Erin Donohue	United States	4:16.41	
20	1	Tetyana Holovchenko	Ukraine	4:17.97	
21	1	Dolores Checa	Spain	4:20.44	
22	1	Veronica Nyaruai	Kenya	4:21.50	
-	1	Yuliya Fomenko	Russia	DSQ	*
-	2	Yelena Soboleva	Russia	DSQ	*

Note: Both Yuliya Fomenko and Yelena Soboleva originally advanced to the final but were later retrospectively disqualified.

=== Final ===
Rank	Name	Nationality	Time	Notes
1st place, gold medalist(s)	Maryam Yusuf Jamal	Bahrain	3:58.75	SB
2nd place, silver medalist(s)	Iryna Lishchynska	Ukraine	4:00.69	SB
3rd place, bronze medalist(s)	Daniela Yordanova	Bulgaria	4:00.82	SB
4	Mariem Alaoui Selsouli	Morocco	4:01.52	PB
5	Viola Kibiwot	Kenya	4:02.10	PB
6	Agnes Samaria	Namibia	4:07.61	NR
7	Natalya Panteleyeva	Russia	4:07.82	
8	Lidia Chojecka	Poland	4:08.64	
9	Nataliya Tobias	Ukraine	4:10.56	
10	Iris Fuentes-Pila	Spain	4:14.00	
-	Yuliya Fomenko	Russia	DSQ	
-	Yelena Soboleva	Russia	DSQ	

Both Yuliya Fomenko and Yelena Soboleva originally participated in the final (with Soboleva finishing in second place), but were later retrospectively disqualified due to doping offences.
