= 2007 European Athletics Indoor Championships – Women's 1500 metres =

The Men's 1500 metres event at the 2007 European Athletics Indoor Championships was held on March 2–3.

== Medalists ==
Gold	Silver	Bronze
Lidia Chojecka; Poland	Natalya Pantelyeva; Russia	Olesya Chumakova; Russia

== Results ==
=== Heats ===
First 3 of each heat (Q) and the next 3 fastest (q) qualified for the final.

Rank	Heat	Name	Nationality	Time	Notes
1	1	Sonja Roman	Slovenia	4:10.68	Q
2	1	Helen Clitheroe	Great Britain	4:10.96	Q
3	1	Nataliya Tobias	Ukraine	4:11.09	Q
4	1	Marina Munćan	Serbia	4:12.35	q, NR
5	1	Cristina Vasiloiu	Romania	4:13.32	q, AJR
6	2	Lidia Chojecka	Poland	4:16.24	Q
7	2	Natalya Pantelyeva	Russia	4:16.54	Q
8	2	Mayte Martínez	Spain	4:16.69	Q
9	2	Olesya Chumakova	Russia	4:16.74	q
10	1	Zulema Fuentes-Pila	Spain	4:17.42	
11	1	Kristine Eikrem Engeset	Norway	4:19.31	
12	2	Katrina Wootton	Great Britain	4:19.62	
13	2	Mari Järvenpää	Finland	4:20.52	
14	2	Esther Desviat	Spain	4:21.07	
15	2	Daniela Donisa	Romania	4:22.91	
16	1	Rasa Drazdauskaitė	Lithuania	4:23.38	
17	2	Catalina Oprea	Romania	4:27.74	
	1	Yelena Kanales	Russia	DNF	

=== Final ===
Rank	Name	Nationality	Time	Notes
1st place, gold medalist(s)	Lidia Chojecka	Poland	4:05.13	
2nd place, silver medalist(s)	Natalya Pantelyeva	Russia	4:06.04	PB
3rd place, bronze medalist(s)	Olesya Chumakova	Russia	4:06.48	SB
4	Helen Clitheroe	Great Britain	4:08.60	
5	Mayte Martínez	Spain	4:09.18	PB
6	Nataliya Tobias	Ukraine	4:09.62	SB
7	Sonja Roman	Slovenia	4:11.57	
8	Cristina Vasiloiu	Romania	4:13.63	
9	Marina Munćan	Serbia	4:14.60	
