= Athletics at the 2008 Summer Olympics – Women's 1500 metres =

Women's 1500 metres at the Games of the XXIX Olympiad
- Venue: Beijing National Stadium
- Dates: 21 August 2008 (heats); 23 August 2008 (final)
- Competitors: 33 from 18 nations
- Winning time: 4:00.23

Medalists
1st place, gold medalist(s)		Nancy Langat	Kenya
2nd place, silver medalist(s)		Iryna Lishchynska	Ukraine
3rd place, bronze medalist(s)		Nataliya Tobias	Ukraine

The women's 1500 metres at the 2008 Summer Olympics took place from 21–23 August at the Beijing National Stadium.

The qualifying standards were 4:07.00 (A standard) and 4:08.00 (B standard).

The event was hit hard by the Russian doping scandal on 31 July 2008, as all three Russian entrants, Yuliya Fomenko, Tatyana Tomashova and Yelena Soboleva, were suspended from competition. These athletes were three of the favourites in Beijing.

== Records ==
Prior to this competition, the existing world record, Olympic record, and world leading time were as follows:

World record	Qu Yunxia (CHN)	3:50.46	Beijing, China	11 September 1993
Olympic record	Paula Ivan (ROU)	3:53.96	Seoul, South Korea	1 October 1988
World Leading	Gelete Burka (ETH)	3:59.75	Valencia, Spain	9 March 2008

No new world or Olympic records were set for this event.

== Results ==
=== Round 1 ===
Qualification: First 3 in each heat(Q) and the next 3 fastest(q) advance to the final.

Rank	Heat	Athlete	Nation	Time	Notes
1	3	Nancy Langat	Kenya	4:03.02	Q, SB
2	3	Nataliya Tobias	Ukraine	4:03.19	Q, SB
3	3	Lisa Dobriskey	Great Britain	4:03.22	Q, PB
4	3	Shannon Rowbury	United States	4:03.89	q
5	3	Anna Alminova	Russia	4:04.66	q
6	1	Maryam Yusuf Jamal	Bahrain	4:05.14	Q
7	1	Natalia Rodríguez	Spain	4:05.30	Q
8	1	Siham Hilali	Morocco	4:05.36	Q, SB
9	1	Anna Mishchenko	Ukraine	4:05.61	q, PB
10	1	Sarah Jamieson	Australia	4:06.64	
11	1	Stephanie Twell	Great Britain	4:06.68	
12	1	Anna Jakubczak	Poland	4:07.33	
13	3	Sylwia Ejdys	Poland	4:08.37	
14	3	René Kalmer	South Africa	4:08.41	
15	3	Sonja Roman	Slovenia	4:08.52	
16	3	Liu Qing	China	4:09.27	
17	1	Christin Wurth-Thomas	United States	4:09.70	
18	1	Irene Jelagat	Kenya	4:09.92	
19	3	Meskerem Assefa	Ethiopia	4:10.04	
20	2	Iryna Lishchynska	Ukraine	4:13.60	Q
21	2	Iris Fuentes-Pila	Spain	4:14.10	Q
22	2	Btissam Lakhouad	Morocco	4:14.34	Q
23	2	Susan Scott	Great Britain	4:14.66	
24	1	Konstadína Efedáki	Greece	4:15.02	
25	2	Viola Kibiwot	Kenya	4:15.62	
26	2	Gelete Burka	Ethiopia	4:15.77	
27	2	Agnes Samaria	Namibia	4:15.80	
28	2	Erin Donohue	United States	4:16.05	
29	2	Lisa Corrigan	Australia	4:16.32	
30	1	Nahida Touhami	Algeria	4:18.99	
31	2	Lidia Chojecka	Poland	4:19.57	
32	3	Bouchra Chaabi	Morocco	4:19.89	
33	2	Domingas Togna	Guinea-Bissau	5:05.76	NR

=== Final ===
Rank	Athlete	Nation	Time	Notes
1st place, gold medalist(s)	Nancy Langat	Kenya	4:00.03	PB
2nd place, silver medalist(s)	Iryna Lishchynska	Ukraine	4:01.63	
3rd place, bronze medalist(s)	Nataliya Tobias	Ukraine	4:01.78	PB
4	Lisa Dobriskey	Great Britain	4:02.10	PB
5	Maryam Yusuf Jamal	Bahrain	4:02.71	
6	Natalia Rodríguez	Spain	4:03.19	SB
7	Shannon Rowbury	United States	4:03.58	
8	Iris Fuentes-Pila	Spain	4:04.86	
9	Anna Mishchenko	Ukraine	4:05.13	PB
10	Siham Hilali	Morocco	4:05.57	
11	Anna Alminova	Russia	4:06.99	
12	Btissam Lakhouad	Morocco	4:07.25	

WR world record | AR area record | CR championship record | GR games record | NR national record | OR Olympic record | PB personal best | SB season best | WL world leading (in a given season)

=== Splits ===
Intermediate	Athlete	Country	Mark
400m	Anna Alminova	Russia	1:05.90
800m	Anna Alminova	Russia	2:13.70
1200m	Maryam Yusuf Jamal	Bahrain	3:16.41
