= 2006 European Athletics Championships – Women's 1500 metres =

Sporting Event

Women's 1500 metres at the European Athletics Championships

The women's 1500 metres at the 2006 European Athletics Championships were held at the Ullevi on August 11 and August 13.

== Medalists ==
Gold	Silver	Bronze
Tatyana Tomashova; Russia	Yuliya Chizhenko; Russia	Daniela Yordanova; Bulgaria

== Schedule ==
Date	Time	Round
August 11, 2006	10:45	Semifinals
August 13, 2006	15:55	Final

== Results ==
KEY:	q	Fastest non-qualifiers	Q	Qualified	NR	National record	PB	Personal best	SB	Seasonal best

=== Semifinals ===
First 4 in each heat (Q) and the next 4 fastest (q) advance to the Final.

Rank	Heat	Name	Nationality	Time	Notes
1	2	Daniela Yordanova	Bulgaria	4:05.72	Q, SB
2	1	Yuliya Chizhenko	Russia	4:05.74	Q
3	1	Tatyana Tomashova	Russia	4:05.81	Q
3	2	Yelena Soboleva	Russia	4:05.81	Q
5	1	Lidia Chojecka	Poland	4:06.10	Q
6	1	Corina Dumbrăvean	Romania	4:06.37	Q, SB
7	2	Hind Dehiba	France	4:06.63	Q
8	1	Nataliya Tobias	Ukraine	4:06.82	q
9	2	Iryna Lishchynska	Ukraine	4:06.84	Q
10	2	Helen Clitheroe	United Kingdom	4:07.28	q
11	1	Maria Martins	France	4:08.07	q, SB
12	1	Tetyana Holovchenko	Ukraine	4:08.56	q
13	2	Eleonora Berlanda	Italy	4:08.81	SB
14	1	Nuria Fernández	Spain	4:08.91	SB
15	2	Lisa Dobriskey	United Kingdom	4:09.47	
16	2	Justyna Lesman	Poland	4:10.01	
17	2	Adriënne Herzog	Netherlands	4:11.16	PB
18	2	Sviatlana Klimkovich	Belarus	4:12.80	
19	1	Ragnhild Kvarberg	Norway	4:12.85	
20	2	Sonja Stolic	Serbia	4:13.19	SB
21	2	Irina Krakoviak	Lithuania	4:13.47	
22	1	Sonja Roman	Slovenia	4:13.59	
23	2	Anna Jakubczak	Poland	4:14.40	
24	1	Eva Arias	Spain	4:15.29	
25	2	Aoife Byrne	Ireland	4:16.07	
26	1	Anny Christofidou	Cyprus	4:19.03	
27	1	Sandra Teixeira	Portugal	4:20.63	
28	2	Isabel Macías	Spain	4:20.76	
	1	Elisa Cusma	Italy		DNF
	1	Rebecca Lyne	United Kingdom		DNS

=== Final ===
Rank	Name	Nationality	Time	Notes
1st place, gold medalist(s)	Tatyana Tomashova	Russia	3:56.91	CR
2nd place, silver medalist(s)	Yuliya Chizhenko	Russia	3:57.61	
3rd place, bronze medalist(s)	Daniela Yordanova	Bulgaria	3:59.37	SB
4	Yelena Soboleva	Russia	4:00.36	
5	Lidia Chojecka	Poland	4:01.43	SB
6	Corina Dumbrăvean	Romania	4:02.24	PB
7	Nataliya Tobias	Ukraine	4:02.71	PB
8	Iryna Lishchynska	Ukraine	4:04.98	
9	Hind Dehiba	France	4:05.46	
10	Tetyana Holovchenko	Ukraine	4:05.53	
11	Helen Clitheroe	United Kingdom	4:09.73	
12	Maria Martins	France	4:13.62	
