= Eva Arias (athlete) =

Spanish middle-distance runner

Eva Arias (born 8 October 1980, in Barcelona) is a Spanish athlete specialising in the middle-distance events and 3000 metres steeplechase. Her biggest success is reaching the final at the 2009 World Championships.

== Competition record ==
Year	Competition	Venue	Position	Event	Notes
Representing Spain
2003	World Indoor Championships	Birmingham, United Kingdom	26th (h)	1500 m	4:21.58
2004	Ibero-American Championships	Huelva, Spain	2nd	1500 m	4:16.61
2005	European Indoor Championships	Madrid, Spain	17th (h)	1500 m	4:22.91
2006	European Championships	Gothenburg, Sweden	24th (h)	1500 m	4:15.29
2009	European Indoor Championships	Turin, Italy	16th (h)	3000 m	9:11.39
2009	Mediterranean Games	Pescara, Italy	6th	1500 m	4:15.80
2009	World Championships	Berlin, Germany	14th	3000 m s'chase	9:33.34

== Personal bests ==
Outdoor

- 1500 metres – 4:08.56 (San Sebastián 2004)
- 3000 metres – 9:11.39 (2009)
- 3000 metres steeplechase – 9:25.14 (Berlin 2009)

Indoor

- 1500 metres – 4:10.98 (Valencia 2009)
- 3000 metres – 9:11.39 (Turin 2009)
