= Olga Yegorova =

Russian middle-distance runner

Medal record

Women's athletics

Representing Russia

World Championships
Gold medal – first place	2001 Edmonton	5000 m
Silver medal – second place	2005 Helsinki	1500 m

World Indoor Championships
Gold medal – first place	2001 Lisbon	3000 m

IAAF World Cup
Gold medal – first place	2002 Madrid	5000 m

Olga Nikolayevna Yegorova (Russian: Ольга Николаевна Егорова; born 28 March 1972 in Novocheboksarsk, Chuvash ASSR) is a Russian distance runner.

Her first international appearance came at the 1990 World Junior Championships in Plovdiv, Bulgaria, where she finished 9th in the 1500m won by future world record holder Qu Yunxia. At the 2000 Summer Olympics she competed in 5000 metres, and she is a double world champion in this event, but like countryfellow Tatyana Tomashova she has concentrated on shorter races since, now competing mainly in the 1500 metres. In this event she finished 11th at the 2004 Summer Olympics and second at the 2005 World Championships.

In 2001, she shared the $1 million jackpot of the IAAF Golden League and in the same year tested positive for EPO which drew protests from her fellow competitors after she was allowed to compete in the World Athletics Championships. Although her urine sample tested positive for EPO, the French authorities failed to take an accompanying blood test and she avoided a suspension on a technicality.

Yegorova was one of seven Russian athletes to be suspended for doping offences ahead of the 2008 Beijing Olympics. On 20 October 2008, it was announced that Yegorova, along with 6 other Russian athletes, would receive two-year doping bans for manipulating drug samples.

== International competitions ==
Year	Competition	Venue	Position	Event	Notes
Representing the Soviet Union
1990	World Junior Championships	Plovdiv, Bulgaria	9th	1500 m	4:19.90
Representing Russia
2001	World Indoor Championships	Lisbon, Portugal	1st	3000 m	8:37.48
2001	World Championships	Edmonton, Canada	1st	5000 m	15:03.39
2002	IAAF World Cup	Madrid, Spain	1st	5000 m	15:18.15
2005	World Championships	Helsinki, Finland	2nd	1500 m	4:01.46

== Personal bests ==
- 1500 metres - 3:59.47 (2005)
- Mile run - 4:20.10 (2007)
- 3000 metres - 8:23.26 (2001)
- 5000 metres - 14:29.32 (2001)

== See also ==
- List of doping cases in athletics
- List of World Athletics Championships medalists (women)
- List of IAAF World Indoor Championships medalists (women)
- Doping at the Olympic Games
- List of 5000 metres national champions (women)

Sporting positions
Preceded by Gabriela Szabo	Women's 3000 m Best Year Performance; 2001	Succeeded by Gabriela Szabo
Preceded by Gete Wami	Women's 5000 m Best Year Performance; 2001	Succeeded by Paula Radcliffe
