= Athletics at the 2003 Summer Universiade – Women's 1500 metres =

The women's 1500 metres event at the 2003 Summer Universiade was held in Daegu, South Korea on 26–28 August.

== Medalists ==
| Gold | Silver | Bronze |
|---|---|---|
| Nataliya Tobias; Ukraine | Johanna Lehtinen; Finland | Malindi Elmore; Canada |

== Results ==
=== Heats ===
| Rank | Heat | Athlete | Nationality | Time | Notes |
|---|---|---|---|---|---|
| 1 | 1 | Malindi Elmore | Canada | 4:13.57 | Q |
| 2 | 1 | Mieke Geens | Belgium | 4:14.83 | Q |
| 3 | 1 | Lívia Tóth | Hungary | 4:14.91 | Q |
| 4 | 1 | René Kalmer | South Africa | 4:14.92 | Q |
| 5 | 1 | Svetlana Cherkasova | Russia | 4:14.94 | Q |
| 6 | 1 | Svetlana Lukasheva | Kazakhstan | 4:15.32 | q |
| 7 | 2 | Yuliya Chizhenko | Russia | 4:16.06 | Q |
| 8 | 2 | Johanna Risku | Finland | 4:16.18 | Q |
| 9 | 2 | Nataliya Sydorenko | Ukraine | 4:16.20 | Q |
| 10 | 2 | Justyna Lesman | Poland | 4:16.31 | Q |
| 11 | 2 | Sonja Roman | Slovenia | 4:16.73 | Q |
| 12 | 1 | Nastassia Staravoitava | Belarus | 4:17.22 | q |
| 13 | 1 | Lisa Dobriskey | Great Britain | 4:17.32 | |
| 14 | 2 | Rebecca Stallwood | Canada | 4:21.46 | |
| 15 | 2 | Irina Krakoviak | Lithuania | 4:25.89 | |
| 16 | 1 | Khadija Touati | Algeria | 4:29.35 | |
| 17 | 2 | Marlene Breytenbach | South Africa | 4:29.93 | |
| 18 | 2 | Alhelí Tapia | Mexico | 4:33.04 | |
| 19 | 1 | Yuliya Belkova | Azerbaijan | 4:36.64 | |
| 20 | 1 | Nam Sun-ha | South Korea | 4:37.48 | |
| 21 | 2 | Karla Silva | Peru | 4:43.20 | |
| 22 | 1 | Ljiljana Ćulibrk | Croatia | 4:47.12 | |
| 23 | 2 | Diana Chelimo | Uganda | 4:49.97 | |
| 24 | 2 | Akuvi Degbotse-Goe | Togo | 5:17.48 | |
| | 2 | Lisbeth Pedersen | Norway | DNF | |

=== Final ===
| Rank | Athlete | Nationality | Time | Notes |
|---|---|---|---|---|
| 1st place, gold medalist(s) | Nataliya Sydorenko | Ukraine | 4:11.69 | |
| 2nd place, silver medalist(s) | Johanna Risku | Finland | 4:11.88 | |
| 3rd place, bronze medalist(s) | Malindi Elmore | Canada | 4:12.00 | |
| 4 | Yuliya Chizhenko | Russia | 4:12.79 | |
| 5 | Justyna Lesman | Poland | 4:13.93 | |
| 6 | Svetlana Lukasheva | Kazakhstan | 4:14.07 | |
| 7 | Lívia Tóth | Hungary | 4:14.15 | |
| 8 | René Kalmer | South Africa | 4:14.78 | |
| 9 | Nastassia Staravoitava | Belarus | 4:14.80 | |
| 10 | Svetlana Cherkasova | Russia | 4:14.86 | |
| 11 | Sonja Roman | Slovenia | 4:16.20 | |
| 12 | Mieke Geens | Belgium | 4:24.71 | |
