= 2001 European Athletics U23 Championships – Women's 1500 metres =

The women's 1500 metres event at the 2001 European Athletics U23 Championships was held in Amsterdam, Netherlands, at Olympisch Stadion on 12 and 14 July.

== Medalists ==
Gold	Alesya Turova; Belarus
Silver	Natalia Rodríguez; Spain
Bronze	Kelly Caffel; United Kingdom

== Results ==
=== Final ===
14 July

Rank	Name	Nationality	Time	Notes
1st place, gold medalist(s)	Alesya Turova	Belarus	4:09.71	
2nd place, silver medalist(s)	Natalia Rodríguez	Spain	4:11.20	
3rd place, bronze medalist(s)	Kelly Caffel	United Kingdom	4:12.30	
4	Iris Fuentes-Pila	Spain	4:13.10	
5	Rasa Drazdauskaitė	Lithuania	4:13.33	
6	Hanna Karlsson	Sweden	4:15.25	
7	Johanna Risku	Finland	4:15.64	
8	Noah Beitler	Israel	4:15.71	
9	Natalya Sidorenko	Ukraine	4:17.21	
10	Jéssica Augusto	Portugal	4:17.71	
11	Karine Sénéjoux	France	4:19.23	
12	Sonja Roman	Slovenia	4:19.86	

=== Heats ===
12 July
Qualified: first 4 in each heat and 4 best to the Final

==== Heat 1 ====
Rank	Name	Nationality	Time	Notes
1	Natalia Rodríguez	Spain	4:17.53	Q
2	Jéssica Augusto	Portugal	4:17.57	Q
3	Natalya Sidorenko	Ukraine	4:17.63	Q
4	Rasa Drazdauskaitė	Lithuania	4:18.01	Q
5	Sonja Roman	Slovenia	4:18.18	q
6	Noah Beitler	Israel	4:19.17	q
7	Rachel Felton	United Kingdom	4:20.81	
	Sviatlana Klimkovich	Belarus	DNF	

==== Heat 2 ====
Rank	Name	Nationality	Time	Notes
1	Alesya Turova	Belarus	4:17.30	Q
2	Kelly Caffel	United Kingdom	4:17.39	Q
3	Iris Fuentes-Pila	Spain	4:17.65	Q
4	Johanna Risku	Finland	4:18.29	Q
5	Karine Sénéjoux	France	4:18.71	q
6	Hanna Karlsson	Sweden	4:19.95	q
7	Ann-Marie Larkin	Ireland	4:22.62	
8	Maria Tsirba	Greece	4:25.93	

== Participation ==
According to an unofficial count, 16 athletes from 13 countries participated in the event.

- Belarus (2)
- Finland (1)
- France (1)
- Greece (1)
- Ireland (1)
- Israel (1)
- Lithuania (1)
- Portugal (1)
- Slovenia (1)
- Spain (2)
- Sweden (1)
- Ukraine (1)
- United Kingdom (2)
