= 2009 European Athletics Indoor Championships – Women's 3000 metres =

The Women's 3000 metres event at the 2009 European Athletics Indoor Championships was held on March 6–7.

== Doping ==
Anna Alminova originally came sixth in the race, but was disqualified in 2014 after the IAAF handed her a doping ban caused by abnormalities in her biological passport profile. All her results from 16 February 2009 onwards were annulled.

== Medalists ==
Gold	Silver	Bronze
Alemitu Bekele; Turkey	Sara Moreira; Portugal	Mary Cullen; Ireland

== Results ==
=== Heats ===
First 4 of each heat (Q) and the next 4 fastest (q) qualified for the final.

Rank	Heat	Name	Nationality	Time	Notes
1	2	Mary Cullen	Ireland	8:55.01	Q
2	2	Yuliya Zarudneva	Russia	8:55.49	Q
3	1	Alemitu Bekele	Turkey	8:57.94	Q
4	1	Nuria Fernández	Spain	8:58.02	Q
DQ	1	Anna Alminova	Russia	~~8:58.03~~	Q, Doping
5	1	Sara Moreira	Portugal	8:58.09	Q
6	2	Silvia Weissteiner	Italy	8:59.17	Q
7	2	Jessica Augusto	Portugal	9:00.20	Q
8	1	Deirdre Byrne	Ireland	9:00.67	q, PB
9	1	Katrina Wootton	Great Britain	9:01.21	q
10	2	Ancuta Bobocel	Romania	9:01.65	q
11	1	Inês Monteiro	Portugal	9:01.88	q
12	1	Elena Romagnolo	Italy	9:05.60	
13	2	Sonja Stolić	Serbia	9:10.10	PB
14	1	Élodie Olivarès	France	9:11.26	
15	2	Eva Arias	Spain	9:11.39	PB
	2	Konstadina Efedaki	Greece	DNF	
	2	Lidia Chojecka	Poland	DNF	

=== Final ===
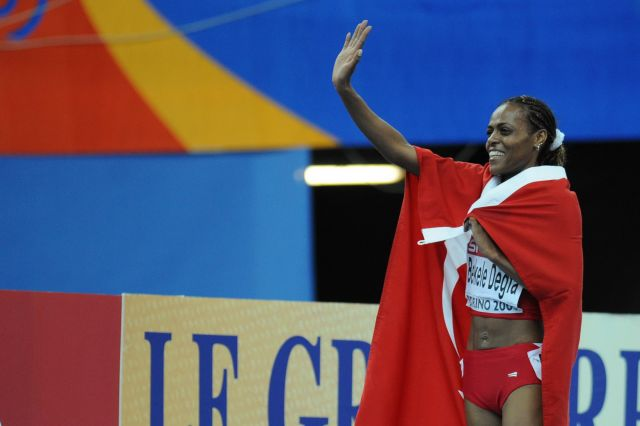
Alemitu Bekele of Turkey won the event with a new national record.

Rank	Name	Nationality	Time	Notes
1st place, gold medalist(s)	Alemitu Bekele	Turkey	8:46.50	NR
2nd place, silver medalist(s)	Sara Moreira	Portugal	8:48.18	PB
3rd place, bronze medalist(s)	Mary Cullen	Ireland	8:48.47	
4	Nuria Fernández	Spain	8:49.49	PB
5	Silvia Weissteiner	Italy	8:50.17	SB
DQ	Anna Alminova	Russia	~~8:51.36~~	Doping
6	Yuliya Zarudneva	Russia	8:58.55	
7	Ancuta Bobocel	Romania	8:59.78	PB
8	Katrina Wootton	Great Britain	9:01.83	
9	Jessica Augusto	Portugal	9:04.48	
10	Deirdre Byrne	Ireland	9:08.89	
11	Inês Monteiro	Portugal	9:14.34	
