= Maryam Yusuf Jamal =

Ethiopian-born Bahraini middle-distance runner

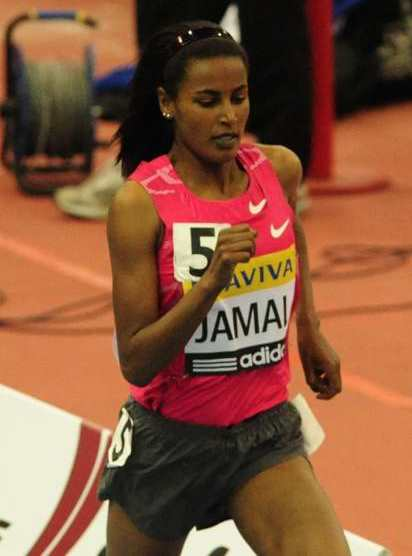
- Jamal at the 2010 Aviva Grand Prix

Medal record

Women's athletics

Representing Bahrain

Olympic Games
| Gold medal – first place | 2012 London | 1500 m |

World Championships
| Gold medal – first place | 2007 Osaka | 1500 m |
| Gold medal – first place | 2009 Berlin | 1500 m |

World Indoor Championships
| Silver medal – second place | 2008 Valencia | 1500 m |
| Bronze medal – third place | 2014 Sopot | 3000 m |

IAAF World Cup
| Gold medal – first place | 2006 Athens | 1500 m |

Asian Games
| Gold medal – first place | 2006 Incheon | 800 m |
| Gold medal – first place | 2006 Incheon | 1500 m |
| Gold medal – first place | 2010 Guangzhou | 1500 m |
| Gold medal – first place | 2014 Incheon | 1500 m |
| Gold medal – first place | 2014 Incheon | 5000 m |

Asian Indoor Championships
| Gold medal – first place | 2014 Hangzhou | 1500 m |
| Gold medal – first place | 2014 Hangzhou | 3000 m |

Asian Cross Country Championships
| Gold medal – first place | 2007 Amman | Senior race |
| Gold medal – first place | 2009 Manama | Senior race |

Maryam Yusuf Jamal (Arabic: مريم يوسف جمال; Oromo: Maaryaam Yuusuf Jamaal) (née Zenebech Tola) (16 September 1984) is an Ethiopian-born Bahraini middle-distance runner. She is the first Bahraini athlete to win an Olympic medal, a gold (originally bronze, but later upgraded after two doping violations by other competitors) in the 1,500m women's race, in the 2012 Summer Olympics in London. This was also the first Olympic medal won by a woman representing a Gulf state. Born in Ethiopia, 2005 was her first full season. She gained the national record and ran the fastest 3000 m of the year, with a time of 8:28.87 at a race in Oslo. Jamal is a two-time world champion in the 1,500 m, having won at the 2007 and 2009 World Championships in Athletics.

She represented Bahrain at the 2008 Summer Olympics in Beijing, finishing fifth in the 1,500 m final. Jamal has also had much success at regional competitions: winning two gold medals at the 2006 Asian Games in addition to the Asian Cross Country Championships in both 2007 and 2009.

== Early life and transfer ==
Jamal was born in the Arsi Zone in the Oromia Region of Ethiopia, an area famous for distance runners, including Haile Gebrselassie, Kenenisa Bekele and Tirunesh Dibaba. She is from a Christian family but it is not certain if she has converted to Islam. She is of Oromo background.

Jamal later left Ethiopia with her husband, Tariq Yaqoob, due partially to political and economic problems. She had run a qualifying time for the 2004 Summer Olympics, but was allegedly refused permission to represent her home country by the Ethiopian Athletic Federation due to the competition in the country as well as politics.

In 2004, she and her husband sought political asylum in Lausanne, Switzerland. She applied for multiple citizenship papers before Bahrain granted them to her that same year. First, she applied for citizenship in the US, Canada and France. Bahrain, eager to gain a sporting image, granted this in exchange that she change her name to an Arabic one and that she compete in the Asian Games in Doha, Qatar in 2006.

Based in Lausanne, Jamal often trains at altitude in St. Moritz. She is trained by her husband Tariq Yaqoob (who was Mnashu Taye before being granted Bahraini citizenship with his wife).

== Career ==
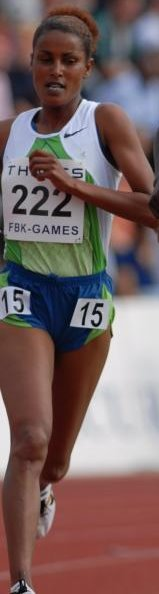
Jamal competing at the FBK Games 2007.

She ran at the 2005 World Championships in Athletics, but was obstructed in the final, which resulted in the disqualification of the silver medallist Yuliya Chizhenko. She beat the event winner, Tatyana Tomashova, soon afterwards to take the gold at the 2005 IAAF World Athletics Final. After a bronze medal performance at the 2006 IAAF World Indoor Championships, Jamal beat Tomashova twice more at major events the following year, bringing Asia victory in the 1500 m at the 2006 IAAF World Cup and winning at the 2006 IAAF World Athletics Final. She closed the year with an 800/1500 m double at the 2006 Asian Games.

She turned her skills to cross country running at the start of 2007: she took first place at the Cinque Mulini and went on to win the individual and team gold medals at the Asian Cross Country Championships. At the 2007 World Championships in Athletics in Osaka, Jamal passed Yelena Soboleva in the last 200 metres to win the women's 1500 metres, winning the only gold medal for Bahrain. She made it a third consecutive World Final victory at the 2007 IAAF World Athletics Final, finishing ahead of Soboleva (who was later disqualified for switching urine samples to avoid drug testing).

At the start of the next season, she competed at the 2008 IAAF World Indoor Championships and ran a close indoor 1500 m against Gelete Burka. Sobeleva set a world record for the victory but was later stripped of the title. Burka was elevated to gold while Jamal gained the silver medal, which she won in an Asian record time of 3:59.79. She did not build on her World Championship success with an Olympic medal as she finished fifth in the 1500 metres at the 2008 Beijing Olympics. Another win at the 2008 IAAF World Athletics Final closed the year.

Jamal became the first female athlete to win twice at the Asian Cross Country Championships, taking her second gold and competing in Bahrain for the first time. She ran at the 2009 IAAF World Cross Country Championships at finished ninth overall. Making up for her Olympic defeat, she defended her world title on the track with a win at the 2009 World Championships in Athletics, just staying ahead of Lisa Dobriskey at the finish line. A fourth-place finish at the 2009 IAAF World Athletics Final brought an end to a successful season.

In 2010, Jamal competed on the inaugural Diamond League circuit, including a second-place finish behind Sentayehu Ejigu at the Herculis meeting. Later that season, she ran at the 2010 Asian Games and managed to retain her title over 1500 m. She later opened her 2011 with a win at the Eurocross, following on from compatriot Mimi Belete's win the previous year.

=== 2012: Olympic Games ===
In the 2012 Summer Olympics in London, Jamal placed third in the 1500m race, finishing in 4:10:74, behind Asli Cakir Alptekin and Gamze Bulut, both of Turkey. Alptekin was later given an eight-year ban for biological passport violations, a doping related offense, and stripped of her gold medal. Gamze Bulut was also later suspended for biological passport irregularities and was stripped of her silver medal on March 29, 2017. Four of the other finishers in the first nine finishers have also been linked to performance-enhancing drugs.

=== 2021: Upgrade to Olympic Gold ===
In December 2021, Maryam Yusuf Jamal was upgraded to the gold medal after those ahead of her had been disqualified for doping violations in March 2017.

== Controversy ==
After winning the 3000 m in Oslo on July 14, 2005, her image was published throughout the international sporting press. Her outfit of short shorts and a sleeveless, midriff-baring top caused a minor outrage in Bahrain led by MP Hamad Al-Muhannadi. In 2004, Bahraini champion Ruqaya Al Ghasra competed in the Athens Olympics fully covered. Bahrain Athletics Association vice-president Mohammed Jamal said the association was already planning to give new sportswear to Jamal, which covered her stomach and her legs down to the knee. However, comments by Mohammed Jamal show that to be unlikely to actually occur.

== Personal bests ==
| Distance | Mark | Location | Date |
|---|---|---|---|
| 800 m | 1:59.69 | Geneva | June 11, 2005 |
| 1500 m | 3:56.79 | Rieti | June 14, 2005 |
| 3000 m | 8:28.87 | Oslo | July 29, 2005 |
| 5000 m | 14:51.68 | Hengelo | May 29, 2005 |
| Quarter marathon | 34:19 | Lausanne | October 24, 2004 |
| Half marathon | 1:11:43 | Uster | September 18, 2004 |

== See also ==
- List of Olympic medalists in athletics (women)
- List of 2012 Summer Olympics medal winners
- List of World Athletics Championships medalists (women)
- List of IAAF World Indoor Championships medalists (women)
- List of Asian Games medalists in athletics
- List of eligibility transfers in athletics
- Outline of Bahrain
- 1500 metres at the Olympics
- 1500 metres at the World Championships in Athletics

Sporting positions
| Preceded by Isabella Ochichi | Women's 3,000 m season's best 2005 | Succeeded by Meseret Defar |
