= Nuria Fernández =

Spanish middle-distance runner

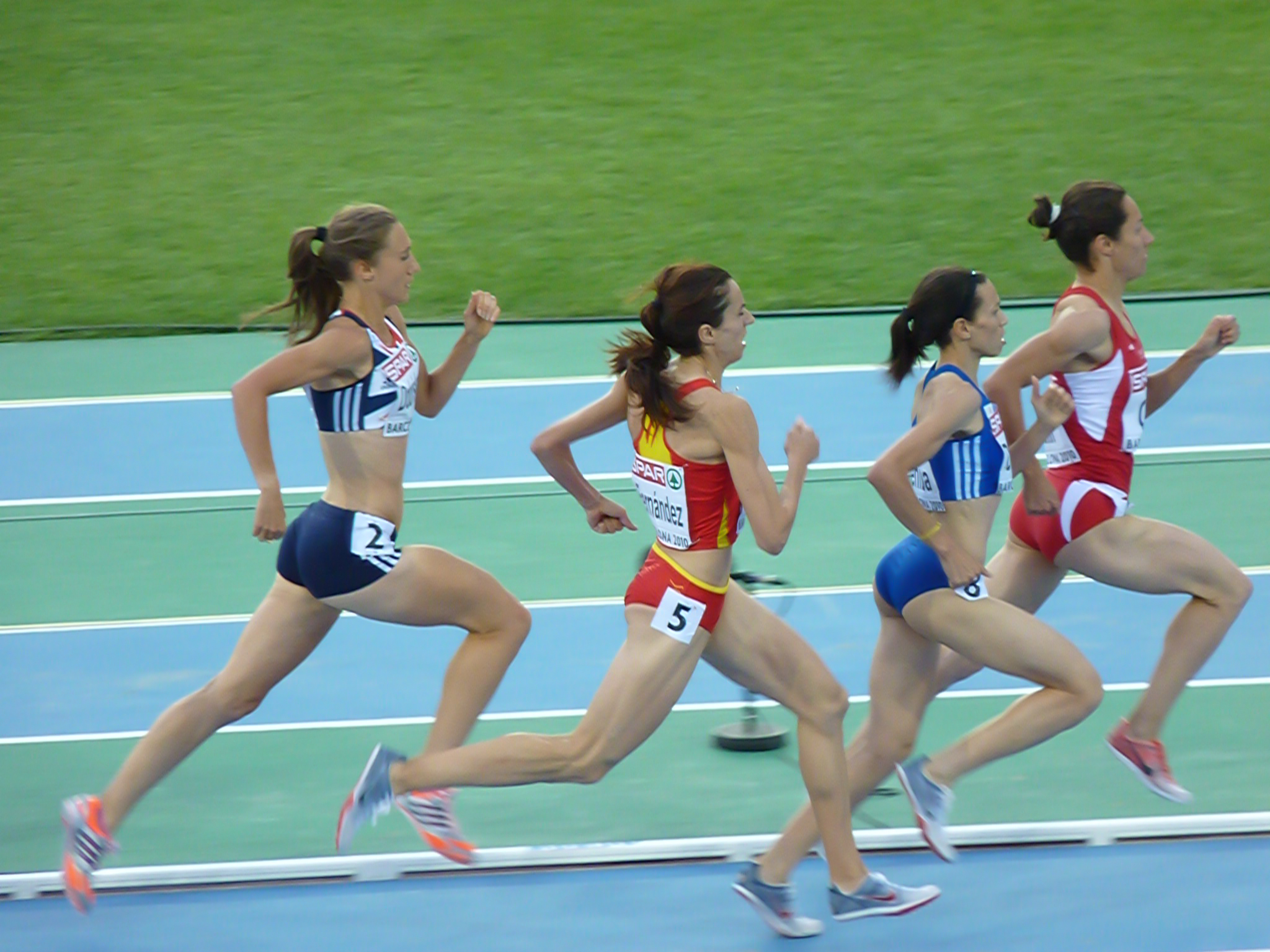
- Nuria Fernández (5) in Barcelona 2010

Personal information
- Full name: Nuria Fernández Domínguez
- Nationality: Spanish
- Born: 16 August 1976 (age 49) Lucerne, Switzerland
- Height: 170 cm (5 ft 7 in)
- Weight: 57 kg (126 lb)

Sport
- Sport: Athletics
- Event: 1500 m
Medal record
Women's athletics
Representing Spain
European Championships
Gold medal – first place	2010 Barcelona	1500 m
Gold medal – first place	2012 Helsinki	1500 m
European Indoor Championships
Silver medal – second place	2011 Paris	1500 m

Nuria Fernández Domínguez (born 16 August 1976 in Luzern, Switzerland) is a Spanish middle-distance runner. She specialises in the 1500 metres and is the Spanish record holder in the mile run and the 1500 m indoors.

== Career ==
Fernández has represented Spain at the 2000, 2004 and 2012 Summer Olympics as well as at the 1999, 2001, 2003, 2005, 2009 and 2011 World Championships in Athletics. She has also represented Spain at four European Championships in Athletics, three World Athletics Indoor Championships and four European Athletics Indoor Championships.

Fernández's best result came at the 2010 European Championships in Athletics where she won gold in the 1500 m, ahead of France's Hind Dehiba and Spain's Natalia Rodriguez. Following that result, she won silver at the 2011 European Indoor Championships in Athletics held in Paris, behind Russia's Elena Arzhakova. After a number of athletes were disqualified, Fernandez also won gold at the 2012 European Championships in Athletics held in Helsinki. She also finished fourth in the 1500 m at the 2009 World Championships in Athletics and fourth again in the 3000 m at the 2009 European Athletics Indoor Championships.

Although Fernández specializes in the 1500 m, she has achieved significant success in cross country events. She won bronze medals representing Spain in the team competition at both the 2009 European Cross Country Championships held in Dublin (Ireland) and the 2010 European Cross Country Championships held in Albufeira (Portugal). She followed this with a win at the Cross Internacional de San Sebastián in January 2011, and a victory at the Spanish Cross Country Championships in February 2011.

She ran at the Cursa Bombers 10 km race in 2010 and finished second behind Jéssica Augusto in a time of 33:03. Fernández ran a world-leading and personal best time of 8:38.05 in the 3000 metres at the Gran Premio de Andalucía in Huelva, beating opposition including Ines Chenonge and Sara Moreira.

On 9 December 2010 Fernández was questioned as a witness in relation to Operation Galgo, an investigation into a Spanish athletics doping ring being carried out by the Guardia Civil. She denied all charges of doping and was allowed to remain on the team that represented Spain at the European Cross Country Championships held in Albufeira, Portugal. El País reported that her coach, Manuel Pascua, admitted to police that he organised doping schedules for his athletes. Pascua later denied this report.

== International competitions ==
Year	Competition	Venue	Position	Event	Notes
Representing Spain
1993	European Junior Championships	San Sebastián, Spain	6th (h)	800m	2:10.71
1994	World Junior Championships	Lisbon, Portugal	15th (sf)	800m	2:11.38
1995	European Junior Championships	Nyíregyháza, Hungary	7th (h)	800m	2:10.21
1997	European U23 Championships	Turku, Finland	13th (h)	800m	2:06.05
1997	Mediterranean Games	Bari, Italy	8th	800m	2:08.87
1998	Ibero-American Championships	Lisbon, Portugal	2nd	1500m	4:20.20
1998	European Championships	Budapest, Hungary	36th (h)	800m	2:04.89
1999	World Championships	Seville, Spain	10th (h)	1500 m	4:09.39
2000	Summer Olympics	Sydney, Australia	10th (sf)	1500 m	4:10.92
2001	World Indoor Championships	Lisbon, Portugal	7th	1500 m	4:15.37
2001	World Championships	Edmonton, Canada	12th	1500 m	4:17.86
2002	European Championships	Munich, Germany	8th	1500 m	4:07.11
2002	World Cup	Madrid, Spain	7th	1500 m	4:11.56
2004	Summer Olympics	Athens, Greece	17th (sf)	1500 m	4:07.68
2005	European Indoor Championships	Madrid, Spain	7th	1500 m	4:12.04
2005	Mediterranean Games	Almería, Spain	3rd	1500 m	4:11.20
2006	World Indoor Championships	Moscow, Russia	7th (h)	1500 m	4:17.12
2006	European Championships	Gothenburg, Sweden	14th (h)	1500 m	4:08.91
2008	World Athletics Final	Stuttgart, Germany	6th	1500 m	4:08.24
2009	European Indoor Championships	Turin, Italy	4th	3000 m	8:49.49
2009	World Championships	Berlin, Germany	4th	1500 m	4:04.91
2010	Ibero-American Championships	San Fernando, Spain	1st	1500 m	4:05.71
2010	European Championships	Barcelona, Spain	1st	1500 m	4:00.20
2011	European Indoor Championships	Paris, France	2nd	1500 m	4:14.04
2011	World Cross Country Championships	Punta Umbría, Spain	24th	8 km	26:39
2012	European Championships	Helsinki, Finland	1st	1500 m	4:08.80
2012	Olympic Games	London, United Kingdom	21st (sf)	1500 m	4:06.57
2014	European Championships	Zürich, Switzerland	5th	5000 m	15:35.59
2017	European Indoor Championships	Belgrade, Serbia	10th	3000 m	9:05.17

=== Personal bests ===
- 800 metres - 2:00.35 min (2008)
- 1500 metres - 4:00.20 min (2010)
- Mile run - 4:21.13 min (2008)
- 3000 metres - 8:38.05 min (2010)
