= Treniere Moser =

American middle-distance runner

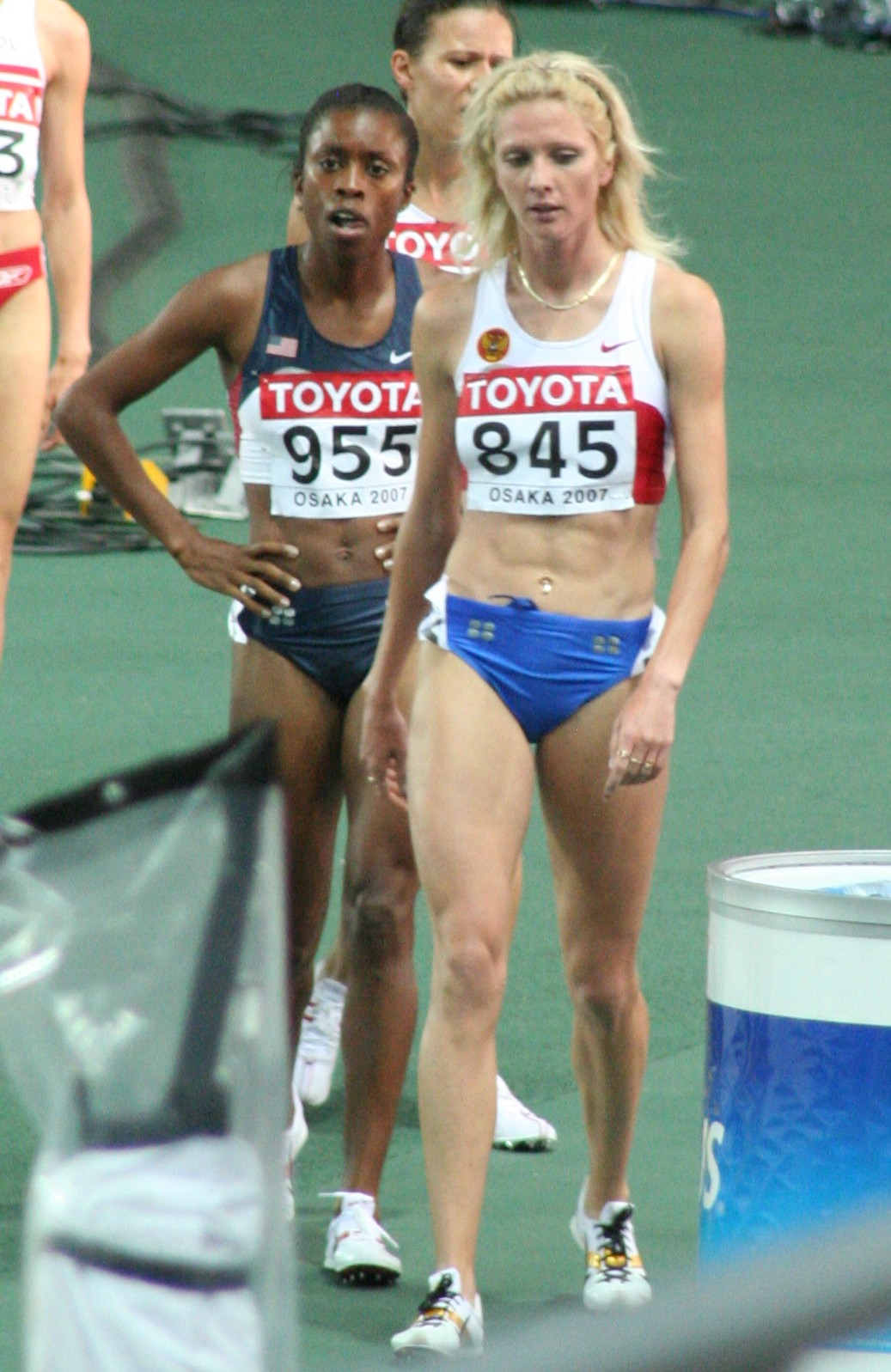
- Treniere Moser (left) at the 2007 World Championships

Personal information
- Nationality: American
- Born: October 27, 1981 (age 44) Stow, Ohio, U.S.

Sport
- Sport: Track
- Events: 800 meters, 1500 meters, mile
- College team: Georgetown
- Club: Nike Oregon Project
- Turned pro: 2004
- Retired: 2016

Achievements and titles
- World finals: 2006, 2014, 2015
- Personal bests: 800 meters: 1:59.15; 1500 meters: 4:02.85; 5000 meters: 15:11.00

Treniere Moser (born Treniere Clement October 27, 1981 in Stow, Ohio) is an American track and field athlete specializing in middle-distance races. She is a five-time outdoor champion (2005, 2006, 2007 and 2013) at 1500 metres, along with a 2006 indoor championship. As national champion, she represented the US at the 2005 and 2007 World Championships. At the 2006 IAAF World Cup, she finished eighth and the 2006 World Indoor Championships she finished seventh.

== Running career ==
=== Collegiate ===
Clement studied and ran competitively at Georgetown University. At Georgetown, she finished second in the 1500m at the NCAA Women's Outdoor Track and Field Championships her senior year. Prior to that she attended Stow-Munroe Falls High School. Clement turned professional in 2004.

=== Nike Oregon Project (2013-present) ===
She joined the Nike Oregon Project in 2013, after which she set personal bests at nearly every distance. She won her fourth US Outdoor 1500m title in 2013, and ran at the World Indoor Championships during the 2014 indoor season. The following year, Moser placed 6th in a tactical final of the 2015 US Outdoor Championships Women's 1500m.

== Personal Bests ==
Event	Time	Venue	Date
Road
Mile run	4:24.3	Fifth Avenue Mile	September 13, 2014
Outdoor
800 m	1:59.15	New York, NY	June 2, 2007
1000 m	2:37.53	New York, NY	June 13, 2015
1500 m	4:02.85	Eugene, Oregon	June 1, 2013
Mile run	4:35.07	Philadelphia, PA	April 30, 2005
5000 m	15:11.00	Los Angeles (OC), CA	May 17, 2013
Distance Medley	10:36.50	Nassau, Bahamas	May 2, 2015
Indoor
800 m	2:01.79	New York, NY	January 31, 2015
1000 m	2:37.86	Boston, MA	February 7, 2015
1500 m	4:07.85	Sopot, Poland	March 8, 2014
Mile run	4:27.49	New York, NY	February 14, 2015
3000 m	9:11.44	Fayetteville, AR	March 13, 2004
5000 m	16:16.75	Fayetteville, AR	February 9, 2007

== Competition record ==
US Outdoor Championship Results

Year	Event	Place	Time
2003	1500 m	15th	4:17.22
2004	1500 m	16th	4:14.42
2005	1500 m	1st	4:06.73
2006 i	1500 m	1st	4:08.13
2006	1500 m	1st	4:10.44
2007	1500 m	1st	4:07.04
2008	1500 m	12th	4:24.62
2009	1500 m	5th	4:09.10
2010	800 m	4th	2:00.51
2011	1500 m	6th	4:09.72
2012	1500 m	11th	4:15.84
2013 i	Mile	2nd	5:06.55
2013	1500 m	1st	4:28.62
2014 i	1500 m	2nd	4:09.93
2014	5000 m	8th	15:43.84
2015 i	1000 m	2nd	2:40.611
2015	1500 m	6th	4:16.18
2016 i	1500 m	7th	4:14.87
2016	1500 m	24th	DNS

Medal Record

Year	Competition	Venue	Position	Event	Notes
2015	World Relay Championships	Nassau, Bahamas	1st	Distance medley relay	10:36.50 (WR AR NR)
