= 2001 European Athletics U23 Championships – Women's 3000 metres steeplechase =

The women's 3000 metres steeplechase event at the 2001 European Athletics U23 Championships was held in Amsterdam, Netherlands, at Olympisch Stadion on 13 July.

== Medalists ==
Gold	Melanie Schulz; Germany
Silver	Lívia Tóth; Hungary
Bronze	Sigrid Vanden Bempt; Belgium

== Results ==
=== Final ===
13 July

Rank	Name	Nationality	Time	Notes
1st place, gold medalist(s)	Melanie Schulz	Germany	10:03.34	
2nd place, silver medalist(s)	Lívia Tóth	Hungary	10:04.99	
3rd place, bronze medalist(s)	Sigrid Vanden Bempt	Belgium	10:08.46	
4	Fanny Pruvost	France	10:08.51	
5	Johanna Risku	Finland	10:09.96	
6	Ragnhild Kvarberg	Norway	10:17.79	
7	Elena Mîndrilă	Romania	10:21.15	
8	Ida Nilsson	Sweden	10:24.84	
9	Yamina Bouchaouante	France	10:26.52	
10	Roisin McGettigan	Ireland	10:46.66	
11	Ivona Milodin	Romania	10:58.66	
	Sandra Rieux	France	DNF	

== Participation ==
According to an unofficial count, 12 athletes from 9 countries participated in the event.

- Belgium (1)
- Finland (1)
- France (3)
- Germany (1)
- Hungary (1)
- Ireland (1)
- Norway (1)
- Romania (2)
- Sweden (1)
