= Johanna Lehtinen =

Finnish middle-distance runner

Johanna Maria Lehtinen
Personal information
- Nationality: Finnish
- Born: Johanna Risku; February 21, 1979 (age 46) Parkano, Finland

Sport
- Sport: Athletics
- Event: Middle distance

Johanna Maria Lehtinen (née Risku, born 21 February 1979 in Parkano) is a Finnish athlete who specialises in the middle distance events.

She competed at the 2005 World Championships in the 1500 metres.

== Competition record ==
Year	Competition	Venue	Position	Event	Notes
Representing Finland
2001	European U23 Championships	Amsterdam, Netherlands	7th	1500 m	4:15.64
2001	European U23 Championships	Amsterdam, Netherlands	5th	3000 m s'chase	10:09.96
2003	Universiade	Daegu, South Korea	2nd	1500 m	4:11.88
2005	World Championships	Helsinki, Finland	22nd (h)	1500 m	4:15.44
2012	European Championships	Helsinki, Finland	18th (h)	1500 m	4:14.83
2012	European Championships	Helsinki, Finland	–	5000 m	DNF
2014	European Championships	Zürich, Switzerland	11th	3000 m s'chase	9:54.90

== Personal bests ==
400 m	56.24	2003
800 m	2:03.25	2005
1500 m	4:06.85	2003
3000 m	9:02.29	2012
5000 m	15:37.21	2012
10000 m	33:18.73	2013
2000 m steeplechase	6:18.09 (NR)	2006
3000 m steeplechase	9:40.28	2006
