= Olesya Chumakova =

Russian middle-distance runner

Olesya Chumakova (born 23 July 1981) is a Russian middle distance runner who specializes in the 800 and 1500 metres.

On 11 February 2007 she helped establish a world indoor record in the rarely contested 4 × 800 metres relay (8:18.54 minutes with teammates Anna Balakshina, Natalya Panteleyeva and Anna Emashova).

She won the bronze medal in 1500 m at the 2007 European Indoor Athletics Championships.

== Personal bests ==
- 800 metres - 2:00.38 min (2005)
- 1500 metres - 4:02.55 min (2005)
