= Maria Martins (athlete) =

French middle-distance runner

Maria Martins (born 1 April 1974) is a French middle distance runner who specializes in the 1500 and 3000 metres. She was born in Santa Katarina, Cape Verde.

Arriving in Roubaix in 1988 to rejoin her father, Maria is 1.62m tall and weighs 50 kg. A teacher of hers detected her aptitude for Track and Field and directed her towards athletics. She first ran for club Lille UC up to 1993, then at the Athletic Club de Villeneuve-d'Ascq (ACVA) before stopping training at the end of 1995 to have a baby. She restarted training in 1999 encouraged by her coach at Club Villeneuve and then she ran for club US Tourcoing (which became club Lille Métropole Athlétisme in 2006). She has been selected 24 times for French elite Track teams..

In August 2007, she was selected to participate in the 2007 World Championship Athletic team.

== Prizes ==
Cross-Country

- French Champions on Cross Country, long course in 2005.
- Winner of Cross Country nord regional championship, long course in 2000, 2002 and 2005.
- Champion of Nord-Pas-de-Calais Cross Country, long course in 2002.

Athletics

- French Champion 1500 m (outdoor) - 2002
- French Champion 1500 m (indoor) - 2006
- French Champion 3000 m (indoor) - 2003, 2005

== Achievements ==
Year	Competition	Venue	Position	Notes
2005	European Indoor Championships	Madrid, Spain	7th	3000 m
2006	World Indoor Championships	Moscow, Russia	8th	1500 m
2006	European Championships	Gothenburg, Sweden	12th	1500 m

== Personal Bests ==
Outdoor

Event	Time	Date	Location
800 m	2:02.83	17 July 2004	Sotteville
1000 m	2:38.91	15 July 2007	Metz
1500 m	4:04.55	4 July 2003	Paris
1 mile	4:28.67	15 June 2003	Villeneuve-d'Ascq
3000 m	9:00.71	18 June 2005	Florence

Indoor

Event	Time	Date	Location
1500 m	4:11.20	10 February 2006	Eaubonne
3000 m	8:51.76	6 February 2005	Gent
