= Lawrence Shields =

Lawrence Shields may refer to:

- Lawrence Shields (runner) (1895–1976), American middle-distance runner
- Lawrence Shields (politician) (died 1976), American politician from Georgia
- Larry Shields (1893–1953), American Dixieland jazz clarinetist
