= Yuliya Fomenko (runner) =

Russian middle-distance runner

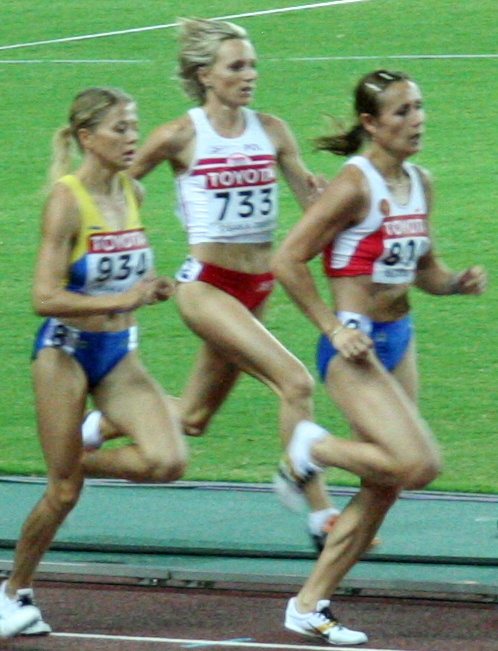
- World Athletics Championships 2007 in Osaka - Scene from the women's 1500 metres final: Nataliya Tobias, Lidia Chojecka, Yuliya Fomenko.

Personal information
- Full name: Yuliya Nikolaevna Chizhenko-Fomenko
- Nationality: Russia
- Born: August 30, 1979 (age 46) Arkhangelsk, Russia

Sport
- Country: Russia
- Sport: Women's athletics
Medal record
World Championships
Disqualified	2005 Helsinki	1500 m
World Indoor Championships
Gold medal – first place	2006 Moskva	1500 m
Disqualified	2008 Valencia	1500 m

Yuliya Nikolaevna Chizhenko-Fomenko (Russian: Юлия Николаевна Чиженко-Фоменко; née Chizhenko; 30 August 1979) is a Russian middle-distance runner who specializes in the 1500 metres.

At the 2005 World Championships she originally finished in silver medal position behind Tatyana Tomashova, but was disqualified for obstructing Maryam Yusuf Jamal of Bahrain. The next year Chizhenko won the World Indoor Championships before finishing second at the 2006 European Athletics Championships, again behind Tomashova.

Fomenko was chosen to represent Russia at the 2008 Summer Olympics, but has since been suspended from competition due to doping test irregularities, along with six other Russian athletes, including Tomashova and Yelena Soboleva.

On 20 October 2008, it was announced that Fomenko and six other Russian athletes would receive two-year doping bans for manipulating drug samples.

== International competitions ==
Representing Russia
Year	Competition	Venue	Position	Event	Notes
2003	Universiade	Daegu, South Korea	4th	1500 m	
2005	World Athletics Final	Monte Carlo, Monaco	6th		
2006	World Indoor Championships	Moscow, Russia	1st	1500 m	
2006	European Championships	Gothenburg, Sweden	2nd	1500 m	

== Personal bests ==
- 800 metres – 1:57.07 (2006)
- 1500 metres – 3:55.68 (2006)
- 3000 metres – 9:01.22 (2003)

== See also ==
- List of doping cases in athletics
- Doping at the Olympic Games
- List of European Athletics Championships medalists (women)
- 1500 metres at the World Championships in Athletics
- Russia at the World Athletics Championships
- Doping at the World Athletics Championships
