= Natalya Panteleyeva =

Russian middle-distance runner

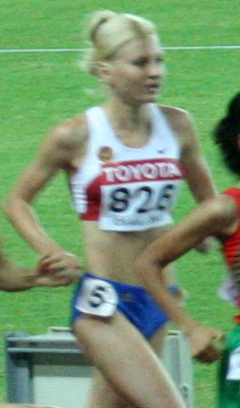
Natalya Panteleyeva

Natalya Panteleyeva (Russian: Наталья Пантелеева; born 10 September 1983) is a Russian middle distance runner who specializes in the 800 metres and 1500 metres.

On 11 February 2007 she helped establish a world indoor record in the rarely contested 4 x 800 metres relay (8:18.54 minutes with teammates Anna Balakshina, Anna Emashova and Olesya Chumakova).

She won the silver medal in 1500 m at the 2007 European Indoor Athletics Championships.

== Personal bests ==
- 800 metres - 1:59.21 min (2006)
- 1500 metres - 4:00.81 min (2006)

== See also ==
- List of European Athletics Indoor Championships medalists (women)
