= Nataliya Tobias =

Ukrainian middle-distance runner

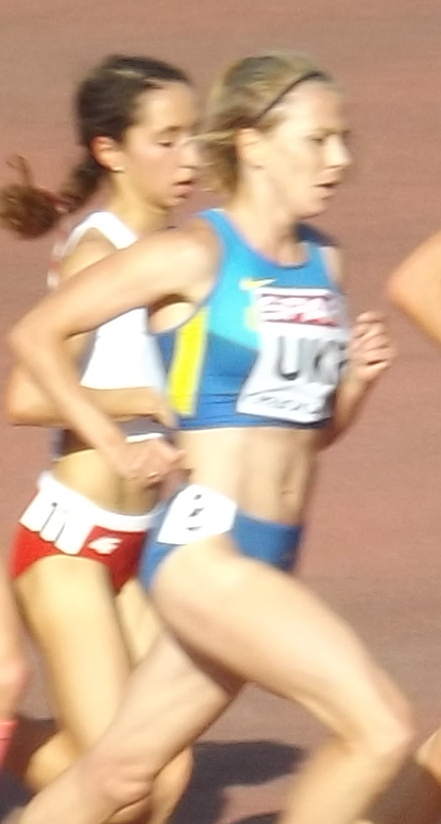
- Nataliya Tobias at the 2015 European Team Championships

Medal record

Women's athletics

Representing Ukraine

Olympic Games
Bronze medal – third place	2008 Beijing	1500 m

European Team Championships
Gold medal – first place	2011 Stockholm	3000 m

European Indoor Cup
Bronze medal – third place	2006 Liévin	1500 m

Universiade
Gold medal – first place	2003 Daegu	1500 m

European U23 Championships
Bronze medal – third place	2001 Amsterdam	4x400 m relay

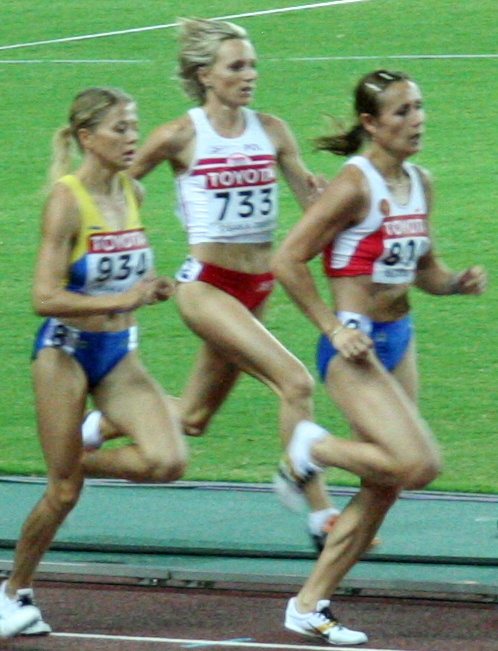
Tobias (left) at the 1500 m final of the 2007 World Championships in Osaka

Nataliya Viktorivna Tobias (Ukrainian: Наталія Вікторівна Тобіас, née Sydorenko (Сидоренко); born 22 November 1980 in Serov, Soviet Union) is a female former middle-distance runner from Ukraine, who specialized in the 1500 metres. She holds personal bests of 4:01.78 minutes for the 1500 m, 2:02.31 minutes for the 800 metres, and 8:51.32 minutes for the 3000 metres.

Tobias represented her country at the Olympics twice, including a 1500 m bronze medal at the 2008 Beijing Olympics. She also competed at the World Championships in Athletics in 2007 and 2011, and was the 1500 m gold medallist at the 2003 Summer Universiade. During her career, she won Ukrainian national titles in five different events.

She graduated from the Donetsk State University of Management. In 2008, she was awarded the Order of Princess Olga, 3rd degree.

Tobias received a two-year ban in 2012 for testing positive for testosterone at the 2011 World Athletics Championships.

== International competitions ==
Year	Competition	Venue	Position	Event	Notes
Representing Ukraine
1999	European Junior Championships	Riga, Latvia	2nd	1500 m	4:15.91
2001	European U23 Championships	Amsterdam, Netherlands	9th	1500 m	4:17.21
2001	European U23 Championships	Amsterdam, Netherlands	3rd	4 × 400 m relay	3:34.16
2001	Universiade	Beijing, China	5th	1500 m	4:12.38
2003	Universiade	Daegu, South Korea	1st	1500 m	4:11.69
2004	World Indoor Championships	Budapest, Hungary	5th	1500 m	4:09.03
2004	World Athletics Final	Monte Carlo, Monaco	9th	3000 m	8:54.32
2004	Olympic Games	Athens, Greece	14th (sf)	1500 m	4:07.55
2006	World Indoor Championships	Moscow, Russia	11th (h)	1500 m	4:15.55
2006	European Championships	Gothenburg, Sweden	7th	1500 m	4:02.71
2007	European Indoor Championships	Birmingham, United Kingdom	6th	1500 m	4:09.62
2007	World Championships	Osaka, Japan	9th	1500 m	4:10.56
2007	World Championships	Osaka, Japan	38th (h)	3000 m s'chase	10:11.58
2008	World Indoor Championships	Valencia, Spain	13th (h)	1500 m	4:11.71
2008	Olympic Games	Beijing, China	3rd	1500 m	4:01.78
2011	European Indoor Championships	Paris, France	19th (h)	1500 m	4:16.67
2011	European Indoor Championships	Paris, France	6th	3000 m	9:02.94
2011	World Championships	Daegu, South Korea	DSQ (9th)	1500 m	DSQ (4:08.68)
2012	World Indoor Championships	Istanbul, Turkey	DSQ (9th)	3000 m	DSQ (9:00.78)

== National titles ==
- Ukrainian Athletics Championships
  - 800 m: 2006
  - 3000 m steeplechase: 2007
  - 5000 m: 2003
- Ukrainian Indoor Athletics Championships
  - 1500 m: 2004, 2008, 2011
  - 3000 m: 2003, 2011

== Personal bests ==
- 800 metres - 2:02.31 min (2006)
- 1500 metres - 4:01.78 min (2008)
- 3000 metres - 8:51.32 min (2003)
- 5000 metres - 15:52.28 min (2003)
