= Iryna Lishchynska =

Ukrainian middle-distance runner

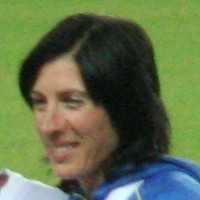
- Iryna Lishchynska in Osaka 2007

Personal information
- Born: 15 January 1976 (age 50) Makiivka, Soviet Union

Sport
- Sport: Track and field
Medal record
Representing Ukraine
Olympic Games
| Silver medal – second place | 2008 Beijing | 1500 m |
World Championships
| Silver medal – second place | 2007 Osaka | 1500 m |
IAAF World Athletics Final
| Bronze medal – third place | 2008 Stuttgart | 1500 m |
European Cup
| Silver medal – second place | 1997 Munich | 800 m |
| Silver medal – second place | 1998 Saint Petersburg | 800 m |
European Indoor Cup
| Gold medal – first place | 2004 Leipzig | 1500 m |
Summer Universiade
| Gold medal – first place | 1997 Catania | 800 m |
European Athletics U23 Championships
| Gold medal – first place | 1997 Turku | 800 m |

Iryna Lishchynska (Ukrainian: Ірина Ліщинська), née Nedelenko (Неделенко) (born 15 January 1976) is a Ukrainian middle-distance athlete who specializes in the 1500 metres.

== Achievements ==
| Year | Competition | Venue | Position | Event | Notes |
Representing Ukraine
| 1994 | World Junior Championships | Lisbon, Portugal | 6th | 1500m | 4:18.47 |
| 1997 | European U23 Championships | Turku, Finland | 1st | 800m | 2:01.72 |
| 2001 | Universiade | Beijing, China | 12th | 1500m | 4:33.81 |
| 2002 | European Championships | Munich, Germany | 10th | 1500m | 4:11.70 |
| 2003 | World Indoor Championships | Birmingham, Great Britain | 5th | 1500m | 4:07.19 |
| 2003 | World Athletics Final | Monte Carlo, Monaco | 10th | 1500m | 4:03.89 |
| 2006 | World Indoor Championships | Moscow, Russia | 5th | 1500m | 4:07.82 |
| 2006 | European Championships | Gothenburg, Sweden | 8th | 1500 m | 4:04.98 |
| 2006 | World Athletics Final | Stuttgart, Germany | 11th | 1500m | 4:14.18 |
| 2007 | World Championships | Osaka, Japan | 2nd | 1500m | 4:00.69 |
| 2007 | World Athletics Final | Stuttgart, Germany | 7th | 1500m | 4:13.82 |
| 2008 | Olympic Games | Beijing, China | 2nd | 1500m | 4:01.63 |

=== Personal bests ===
- 800 metres - 1:59.15 min (1998)
- 1500 metres - 4:00.04 min (2006)
- Mile run - 4:25.32 min (2008) - Ukrainian record.
