= Yelena Soboleva =

Russian middle-distance runner

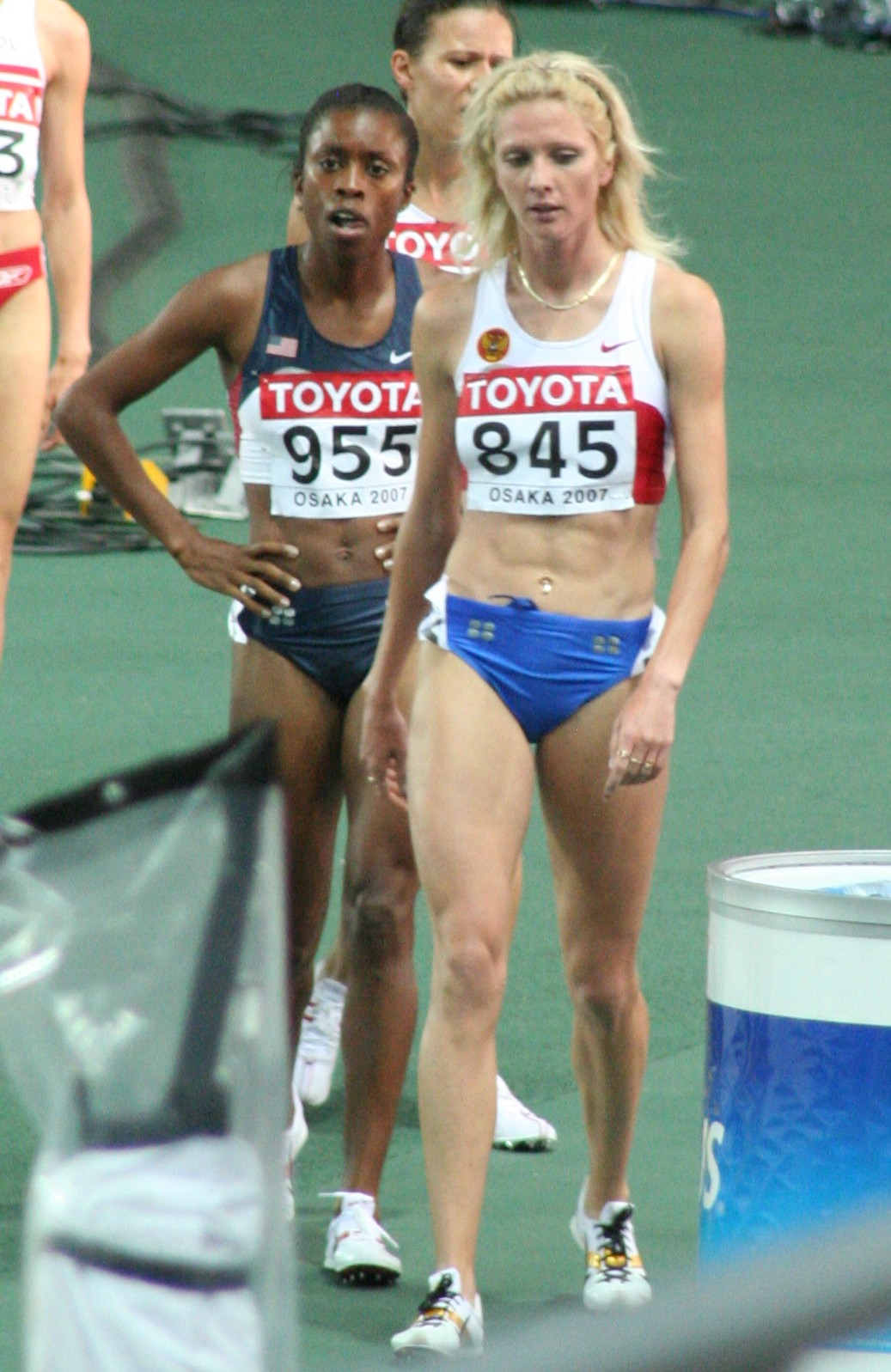
- Soboleva at the 2007 World Championships in Athletics

Medal record

Women's athletics

Representing Russia

World Indoor Championships
Silver medal – second place	2006 Moscow	1500 m

Yelena Vladimirovna Soboleva (Russian: Елена Владимировна Соболева, born 3 August 1982 in Bryansk, Russian SFSR, Soviet Union) is a Russian former middle-distance runner who specialized in the 1500 metres.

In February 2008 she established a new world indoor record of 3:58.05 minutes in a race in Moscow, and in March 2008 she beat her own world record in Valencia. She won a silver medal at the World Indoor Championships in Moscow.

During the Russian Indoor meeting in Moscow in January 2008, she set a new national record in the women's mile run with a time of 4:20.21 minutes, which was the third fastest of all time. She also holds the national indoor record for 800 m, set in Moscow during the 2008 season.

After a two-year doping ban from 2007, she returned to the sport in 2011, but retired after the 2013 season.

== Doping ban ==
Soboleva was selected to represent Russia in both the 800 m and 1500 m at the 2008 Summer Olympics in Beijing, but was suspended from competition, after the discovery of doping test irregularities. She and four her teammates were charged in substitution of their urine tests after competitions last year. There were no charges in using of doping but they were suspended.

On 20 October 2008, it was announced that Soboleva, along with six other Russian athletes would receive two-year doping bans for manipulating drug samples. The ban came into effect from April 2007, when the samples were given for testing.

On 7 April 2021, Soboleva was banned from athletics for 8 years by the Court of Arbitration for Sport with all of her competitive results from 1 May 2011 to 15 December 2016 disqualified.

== International competitions ==
Year	Competition	Venue	Position	Event	Notes
Representing Russia
2003	European U23 Championships	Bydgoszcz, Poland	7th	1500 m	4:15.22
2005	World Championships	Helsinki, Finland	4th	1500 m	4:02.48
2006	World Indoor Championships	Moscow, Russia	2nd	1500 m	4:05.21
2006	European Championships	Gothenburg, Sweden	4th	1500 m	4:00.36
2007	World Championships	Osaka, Japan	DQ (2nd)	1500 m	
2008	World Indoor Championships	Valencia, Spain	DQ (1st)	1500 m	

== Personal bests ==
Outdoor

- 800 metres – 1:57.28 min (2006)
- 1500 metres – 3:56.43 min (2006)
- 3000 metres – 8:55.89 min (2005)

Indoor

- 800 metres – 1:58.53 min (2006)
- 1500 metres – 3:58.28 min (2006)

== See also ==
- List of doping cases in athletics
- List of IAAF World Indoor Championships medalists (women)
- 1500 metres at the World Championships in Athletics
- Russia at the World Athletics Championships
- Doping at the World Athletics Championships
