= Hind Dehiba =

Moroccan-French middle-distance runner

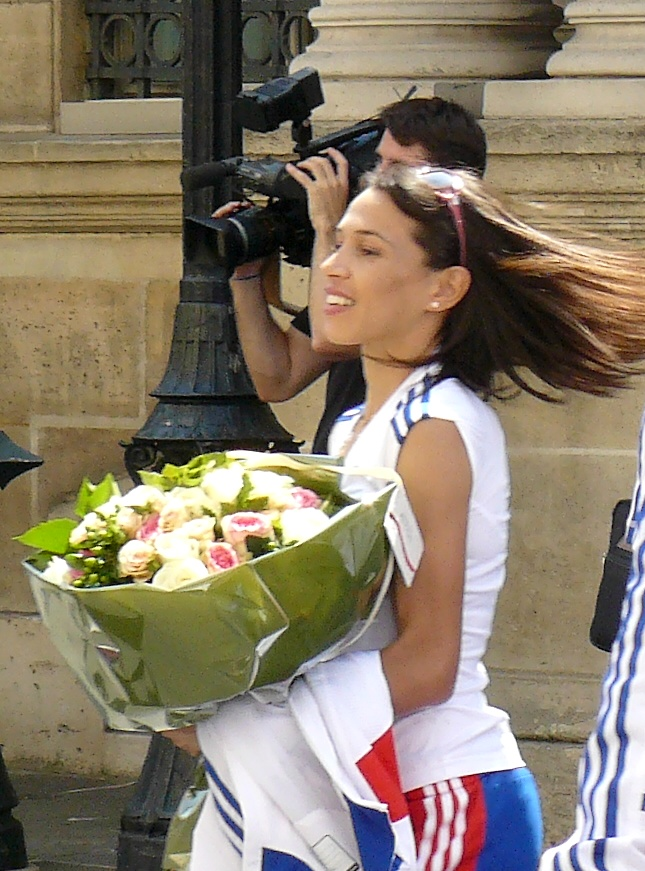
- Dehiba in 2010

Personal information
- Born: 17 March 1979 (age 47) Bejaâd, Morocco

Sport
- Sport: Track and field
Medal record
Representing France
World Indoor Championships
Bronze medal – third place	2012 Istanbul	1500m
European Championships
Silver medal – second place	2010 Barcelona	1500m
European Indoor Championships
Bronze medal – third place	2005 Madrid	1500m

Hind Dehiba Chahyd (born 17 March 1979) is a Moroccan-French runner who specializes in the 1500 metres.

== Early career ==
Her first podium finish at the 2005 European Athletics Indoor Championships came with controversy. She took the bronze medal but impeded fourth-placed Helen Clitheroe in the final stages of the 1500 m. However, Clitheroe's appeal was not successful and Dehiba bagged her first European medal.

At the age of 14, she ran 1500 m in 4 minutes 21 seconds barefoot and 3000m in 9 minutes 26 seconds. She was subsequently selected by Said Aouita (DTN Moroccan at the time) for his first international competition in 1994 at the African Junior Championships in Algiers (Algeria). She was placed sixth in the 3,000 m junior when she was still only 14 years. She became vice-world champion High school cross country in 1996 in Turkey (youngest world champion cross country team).

To complete her education Hind completely stopped competing from July 1998 to June 2003. On resumption of her running in 2003 qualified for the Championship of France Elite 2003 Narbonne at 800m.

In December 2002, she met her husband, Fodil Dehiba in France, and married in 2003 and obtained French nationality before the close of entries for the Athens Olympic Games. At the Athens Olympics, she ran for France and ranked eighth in the third qualifying round of the 1500 m, taking the last qualifying spot in the semifinals.

Hind won the bronze medal at the European Indoor Championships in Madrid in 1500 m. in March 2005 and in 2010 she won the silver medal at the European Championships in Barcelona at 1500m.

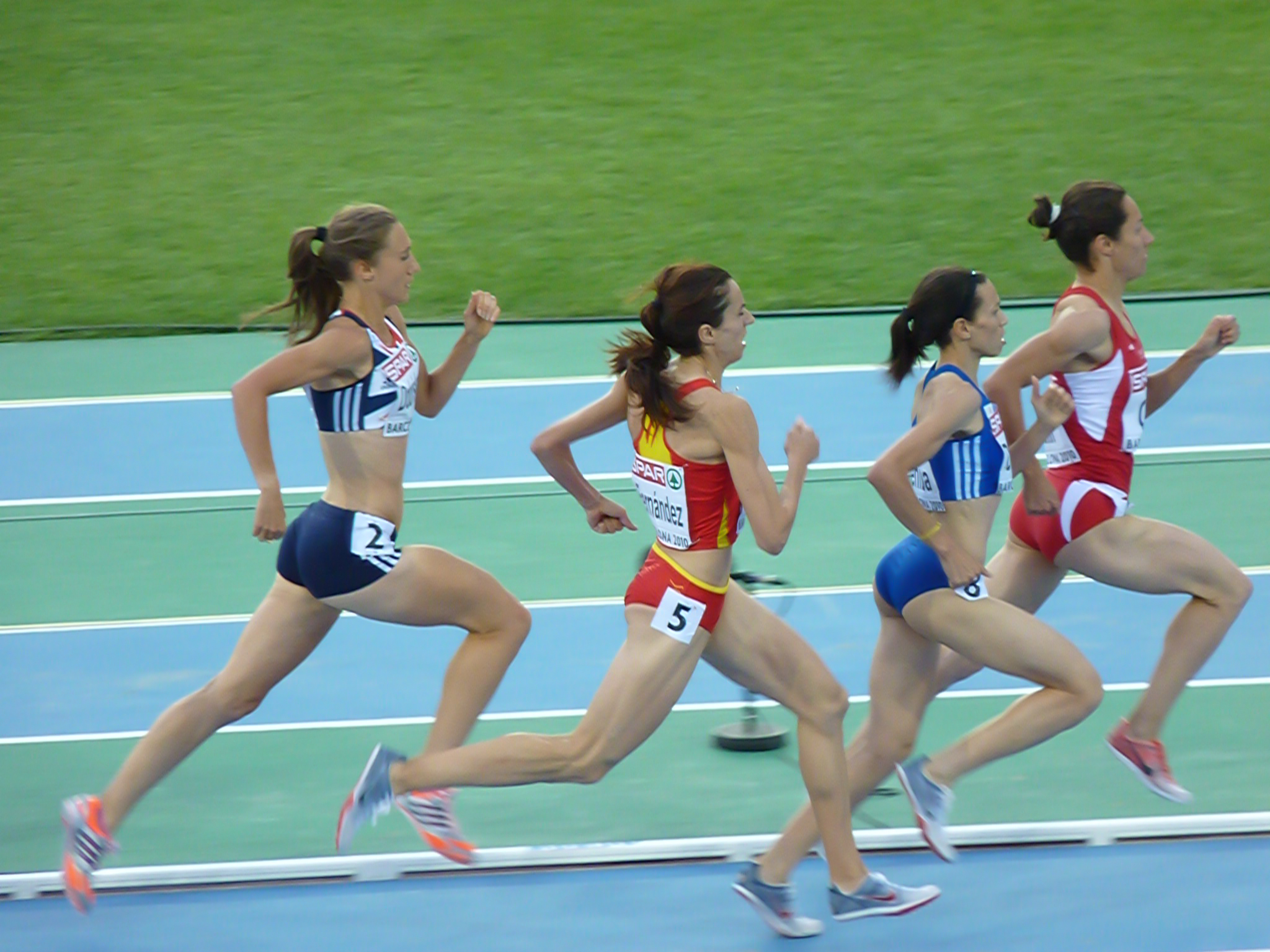
Dehiba (centre right) competing at the 2010 European Championships

In 2005, she was the second meeting of the Paris Saint-Denis and set a new record of France of 1500 m in Rieti in 4 min 00 s 49. During the winter of 2006, it ranks 4th in the final of the World Indoor Championships in 1500 m in Moscow, she beat the record of France in 4 min 05 s 63. During the winter of 2012, it ranks fifth of the World Indoor Championships in Istanbul in 1500. She will recover the world bronze medal after the disqualification of two athletes for doping.

== Doping suspension ==
In January 2007, she was tested positive to EPO. She received a two-year suspension.

== Later career ==
On 16 July 2010, Hind take the second place in the 1500m Diamond league Paris, she broke for the second time the National French Record 1500m, 3 min 59 s 76. At the European Athletics Championships in 2010 (1 August 2010, Hind Dehiba won the silver medal in the 1500 m in 4 min 1.17 s, losing to Spain's Nuria Fernández. A month later in Split, the French won the 1500 m very tactical Continental Cup (formerly World Cup of Nations) in the Europe team, beating out the Kenyan Olympic champion Nancy Langat in a very sprint tight. The latter suffered a drop to ten meters from the finish. She ended her season by winning the rally Carmaux (Tarn), where she established the world's best performance of the year on the mile in 4 min 29 sec 06.

During her career, Hind had three podiums in Diamond League (second in Paris in 2005, second in Paris in 2010 and third in Lausanne in 2011). It was ranked 4th in the World Ranking in 2005 and 2010 to 1500. She won three times France Indoor Championships 1500 m (2004-2005 and 2011), five times the championships of France Elites outdoor 1500 m (2005, 2006, 2009, 2011 and 2012) as well as championships in France 800m in 2009. She became the first and only French athlete to date to have run a 1500 m in less than 4 minutes, with a time of 3 min 59 s 76 at the Diamond League Meeting in Paris at the Stade de France on 16 July 2010. Hind ran 35 times during her career in less than 4 min 10 sec and 15 times in less than 4 min 05 s at 1500 m. In the 800 m, she ran four times in less than 2 minutes. Twice Hind ran in less than 4 min 30 sec in the mile and two times in less than 9 minutes about 3000 m.

13 October 2012, at Meaux, she was elected a member of the Steering Committee of the Board of Seine-et-Marne Athletics for a period of four years. Hind seat on the commission's High Level Sport and chairman of the Athletes Commission.

Hind was a professional athlete for two years in the National Athletics League (LNA) from 1 January 2011 to 31 December 2012.

She graduated with honors from the University Diploma of European Physical Preparator at the University of Lyon1, Brussels and Lausanne (Degree Coach Condition Trainer).

Hind gave birth to a baby girl named Inès in Albuquerque, United States, on 23 July 2013. On 14 November 2016 in Corbeil Essonnes (France), Hind gave birth to "triplets" named Adam, Jana and Salma. They live in Fontainebleau, in the Paris region. In January 2018, the IAAF informed her that she was winning the bronze medal in the 1500m at the 2012 Indoor World Championships, after the disqualification of 2 athletes for doping.

== International competitions ==
Year	Competition	Venue	Position	Notes
1994	African Junior Championships	Algiers, Algeria	6th	3000 m
1996	World High School Youth Cross-Country Championships	Antalya, Turquia	2nd	Cross-Country Individual
1996	World High School Youth Cross-Country Championships	Antalya, Turquia	1st	Cross-Country Team
1997	World Cross Country Championships	Turin, Italy	21st	Junior race
1998	World Cross Country Championships	Marrakesh, Morocco	23rd	Junior race
2004	World Athletics Final	Monte Carlo, Monaco	8th	3000 m
2004	European Clubs Cup	Ljubljana, Slovenia	1st	1500 m
2004	Olympic Games	Athens Olympic Stadium, Greece	25th	1500 m
2005	European Indoor Championships	Madrid, Spain	3rd	1500 m
2005	European Clubs Cup	Faro, Portugal	1st	1500 m
2005	World Athletics Final	Monte Carlo, Monaco	5th	1500 m
2005	World Championships	Helsinki, Finland	13th	1500 m
2006	World Indoor Championships	Moscow, Russia	4th	1500 m
2006	European Championships	Gothenburg, Sweden	9th	1500 m
2006	World Athletics Final	Stuttgart, Germany	8th	1500 m
2006	World Military Cross Country Championships	Tunis, Tunisia	3rd	Cross Country Individual
2006	World Military Cross Country Championships	Tunis, Tunisia	1st	Cross Country Team
2009	World Championships	Berlin, Germany	19th	1500 m
2010	European Championships	Barcelona, Spain	2nd	1500 m
2010	Continental Cup	Split, Croatia	1st	1500 m
2010	DécaNation	Annecy, France	1st	1500 m
2012	World Indoor Championships	Istanbul, Turkey	3rd	1500 m
2012	European Championships	Helsinki, Finland	9th	1500 m

=== Personal bests ===
- 800 metres - 1:58.63 min (2010)
- 1000 metres - 2:38.50 min Indoor(2011)
- 1500 metres - 3:59.76 min (2010)
- One Mile - 4:29.06 min (2010)
- 3000 metres - 8:52.21 min (2005)
