= Corina Dumbrăvean =

Romanian middle-distance runner

Corina Dumbrăvean (born 15 April 1984 in Bistriţa) is a Romanian former middle distance runner who specialized in the 1500 metres.

She finished second at the 2005 European Indoor Athletics Championships in Madrid and sixth at the 2006 IAAF World Indoor Championships in Moscow. At the 2006 European Athletics Championships in Gothenburg she finished sixth in a personal best time of 4:02.24 minutes.

She received a two-year doping ban from November 2007 to 2009. She refused to submit to testing in June 2010 and was given a lifetime ban from the sport of athletics.

== See also ==
- List of doping cases in athletics
