= Helen Clitheroe =

British middle- and long-distance runner

Helen Clitheroe (née Pattinson)
Personal information
- Nationality: British (English)
- Born: 2 January 1974 (age 52) Preston, Lancashire, England
- Height: 1.68 m (5 ft 6 in)
- Weight: 57 kg (126 lb; 9.0 st)

Sport
- Sport: Athletics
- Event: middle-distance
- Club: Preston Harriers

Achievements and titles
- Personal best(s): 1500 m: 4:01.10; 3000 m: 8:51.02; 3000 m steeplechase: 9:29.14; 5000 m: 15:06.75; 10000 m: 31:45
Medal record
Women's athletics
Representing Great Britain
European Indoor Championships
Gold medal – first place	2011 Paris	3000 m
Commonwealth Games
Bronze medal – third place	2002 Manchester	1500 m

Helen Teresa Clitheroe (née Pattinson) (born 2 January 1974 in Preston, England) is a former British middle and long-distance runner.

== Athletics career ==
She competed in the 1500 m at the 2000 Olympics in Sydney and in the 3000 m steeplechase at the 2008 Olympics in Beijing.

She represented England in the 1,500 metres event, at the 1998 Commonwealth Games in Kuala Lumpur, Malaysia. Four years later she was the 1500 m bronze medallist at the 2002 Commonwealth Games.

She achieved the Olympic A qualifying standard for the 3000 m steeplechase at the Meeting Iberoamericano, in Huelva on 13 June 2008, where she finished eighth in a time of 9:43.56. Her place in the British team for the Games was confirmed when she won the British trials in a new national record time of 9:36.98. At the Games she finished sixth in her heat and did not advance to the next round of competition, despite beating her own national record with a time of 9:29.14. At the 2008 IAAF World Athletics Final, in Stuttgart, Clitheroe placed 9th in the 3000 m steeplechase in a time of 9:39.72.

She completed a spell of high-altitude training in Iten, Kenya and then came close to a 3000 m lifetime best at the Aviva International Match in January 2011, finishing with a stadium record run. The May 2011 Great Manchester Run saw her produce a career best for the 10K as she completed a dominant performance to win the race in a time of 31:45 minutes. She set herself a similar target at the European Cup 10000m in June 2011, but suffered in hot conditions and finished in fourth with a time of 32:11.29 minutes.

Domestically, she was three-times the British 1500 metres champion after winning the British AAA Championships title in 2001, 2005 and 2006.

She continued working in the Industry as a coach, and during 2022 was coaching with the New Balance team at Manchester, working as personal coach to Ciara Mageean during her very successful 2022 season.
