= Tatyana Tomashova =

Russian middle-distance runner

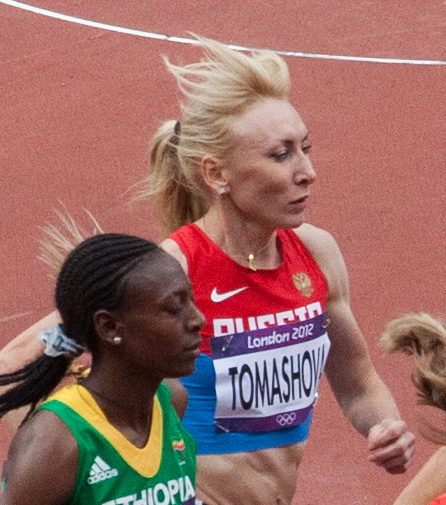
- Tatyana Tomashova at the 2012 Olympics

Medal record

Women's athletics

Representing Russia

Olympic Games
Silver medal – second place	2004 Athens	1500 m
Disqualified	2012 London	1500 m

World Championships
Gold medal – first place	2003 Paris	1500 m
Gold medal – first place	2005 Helsinki	1500 m

European Championships
Gold medal – first place	2006 Gothenburg	1500 m

Tatyana Ivanovna Tomashova (Russian: Татьяна Ивановна Томашова) (born 1 July 1975 in Perm) is a former Russian distance runner.

== Career ==
At the 2000 Summer Olympics, she competed in the 5000 metres but participated in shorter races thereafter, mainly in the 1500 metres. She is a double world champion and single Olympic silver medallist in this event.

On 31 July 2008, Tomashova was suspended by the IAAF, along with six other Russian track and field athletes, for doping offences. She was charged under IAAF rules 32.2 (b) and 32.2 (e) for a "fraudulent substitution of urine which is both a prohibited method and also a form of tampering with the doping control process". She was set to compete in the 2008 Summer Olympics.

On 20 October 2008, it was announced that Tomashova, along with six other Russian athletes would receive two-year doping bans for manipulating drug samples.

She initially came fourth in the 1500 meters at the 2012 Summer Olympics. However, after doping offences by other athletes, she was promoted to the silver medal position. In September 2024, twelve years after the London Games, the Court of Arbitration for Sport announced that Tomashova herself had been stripped of her medal, and banned for ten years for further doping violations.

== Personal bests ==
- 800 metres – 2:02.09 min (2012)
- 1000 metres – 2:34.91 min (2005)
- 1500 metres – 3:56.91 min (2006)
- 3000 metres – 8:25.56 min (2001)
- 5000 metres – 14:39.22 min (2001)

== International competitions ==
On 3 September 2024, CAS banned Tomashova for 10 years as a doping penalty. In addition, all results recorded in competitions from June 21, 2012, to January 3, 2015, including the silver medal at the London 2012 Olympics in the women's 1500 metres, were invalidated. This is not Tomashova's first suspension, as she was suspended in 2008 on suspicion of tampering with doping samples. Tomashova is a 2004 Olympic silver medalist in the 1,500 meters, as well as a two-time world champion (2003 and 2005) in this discipline.

Representing Russia
Year	Competition	Venue	Position	Event	Notes
1994	World Junior Championships	Lisbon, Portugal	—	10,000m	DNF
1999	European Cross Country Championships	Velenje, Slovenia	5th	Senior race	19:09
2002	European Championships	Munich, Germany	3rd	1500 m	4:01.28
2002	IAAF Grand Prix Final	Paris, France	2nd	3000 m	8:56.34
2002	World Cup	Madrid, Spain	2nd	1500 m	4:09.74
2003	World Championships	Paris, France	1st	1500 m	3:58.52
2004	Summer Olympics	Athens, Greece	2nd	1500 m	3:58.12 PB
2004	World Athletics Final	Monte Carlo, Monaco	2nd	1500 m	4:05.18
2005	World Championships	Helsinki, Finland	1st	1500 m	4:00.35
2005	World Athletics Final	Monte Carlo, Monaco	2nd	1500 m	4:00.28
2006	European Championships	Gothenburg, Sweden	1st	1500 m	3:56.91
2012	Summer Olympics	London, United Kingdom	DSQ	1500 m	4:10.48
2015	World Championships	Beijing, China	10th	1500 m	4:13.66

== See also ==
- List of doping cases in athletics
- List of Olympic medalists in athletics (women)
- Doping at the Olympic Games
- List of 2004 Summer Olympics medal winners
- List of 2012 Summer Olympics medal winners
- List of World Athletics Championships medalists (women)
- List of European Athletics Championships medalists (women)
