= Athletics at the 2007 Summer Universiade – Women's 5000 metres =

The women's 5000 metres event at the 2007 Summer Universiade was held on 13 August.

== Results ==
Rank	Name	Nationality	Time	Notes
1st place, gold medalist(s)	Jéssica Augusto	Portugal	15:28.78	GR
2nd place, silver medalist(s)	Tetyana Holovchenko	Ukraine	15:40.56	
3rd place, bronze medalist(s)	Elizaveta Grechishnikova	Russia	15:50.58	
4	Ryoko Kizaki	Japan	15:58.19	
5	Kazue Kojima	Japan	16:04.55	
6	Sonja Stolić	Serbia	16:08.91	
7	Marina Ivanova	Russia	16:15.88	
8	Elizabeth Wightman	Canada	16:29.12	
9	Rini Budiarti	Indonesia	16:40.42	
10	Song Xiaoxue	China	16:54.96	
11	Maria Møller	Denmark	17:33.90	
12	Truong Thi Mai	Vietnam	17:57.96	
13	Kim Soo Young	South Korea	18:01.91	
14	Nguyen Thi Hoa	Vietnam	19:50.50	
	Kalliopi Astropekaki	Greece	DNF	
	Krisztina Papp	Hungary	DNF	
	Midred Kiminy Chebosis	Uganda	DNS	
	Ljiljana Ćulibrk	Croatia	DNS	
	Lucélia Peres	Brazil	DNS	
