= 2005 European Athletics Indoor Championships – Women's 3000 metres =

The Women's 3000 metres event at the 2005 European Athletics Indoor Championships was held on March 4–6.

== Medalists ==
Gold	Silver	Bronze
Lidia Chojecka; Poland	Susanne Pumper; Austria	Sabrina Mockenhaupt; Germany

Note: Turkey's Tezeta Desalegn-Dengersa originally won the silver medal but was later disqualified for doping offence (metenolone).

== Results ==
=== Heats ===
First 4 of each heat (Q) and the next 4 fastest (q) qualified for the final.

Rank	Heat	Name	Nationality	Time	Notes
1	2	Lidia Chojecka	Poland	8:58.99	Q
2	2	Tatyana Holovchenko	Ukraine	9:01.55	Q
3	1	Susanne Pumper	Austria	9:02.12	Q
4	1	Sabrina Mockenhaupt	Germany	9:02.17	Q
5	2	Maria Martins	France	9:02.23	Q
6	2	Jo Pavey	Great Britain	9:02.30	q
7	1	Krisztina Papp	Hungary	9:02.56	Q
8	1	Silvia Weissteiner	Italy	9:03.58	Q, PB
9	2	Yelena Kanales	Russia	9:05.08	q
10	1	Liliya Shobukhova	Russia	9:05.37	q
11	2	Veerle Dejaeghere	Belgium	9:07.95	q
12	1	Konstadina Efedaki	Greece	9:11.12	
13	1	Jacqueline Martín	Spain	9:13.85	
14	2	Jessica Augusto	Portugal	9:18.00	
15	2	Cristina Grosu	Romania	9:22.84	
16	1	Marina Bastos	Portugal	9:25.64	
	2	Tezeta Desalegn-Dengersa	Turkey	DQ (8:59.92)	

=== Final ===
Rank	Name	Nationality	Time	Notes
1st place, gold medalist(s)	Lidia Chojecka	Poland	8:43.76	SB
2nd place, silver medalist(s)	Susanne Pumper	Austria	8:47.74	
3rd place, bronze medalist(s)	Sabrina Mockenhaupt	Germany	8:47.76	SB
4	Silvia Weissteiner	Italy	8:56.27	PB
5	Liliya Shobukhova	Russia	8:57.79	
6	Krisztina Papp	Hungary	9:09.54	
7	Maria Martins	France	9:10.08	
8	Tatyana Holovchenko	Ukraine	9:10.09	
9	Veerle Dejaeghere	Belgium	9:10.22	
	Tezeta Desalegn-Dengersa	Turkey	DQ (8:46.65)	
	Jo Pavey	Great Britain	DNF	
	Yelena Kanales	Russia	DNS	
