= 2005 European Athletics U23 Championships – Women's 10,000 metres =

The women's 10,000 metres event at the 2005 European Athletics U23 Championships was held in Erfurt, Germany, at Steigerwaldstadion on 16 July.

== Medalists ==
Gold	Tatyana Petrova; Russia
Silver	Volha Minina; Belarus
Bronze	Eva Maria Stöwer; Germany

== Results ==
=== Final ===
16 July

Rank	Name	Nationality	Time	Notes
1st place, gold medalist(s)	Tatyana Petrova	Russia	33:55.99	
2nd place, silver medalist(s)	Volha Minina	Belarus	34:03.55	
3rd place, bronze medalist(s)	Eva Maria Stöwer	Germany	34:05.03	
4	Paula Todoran	Romania	34:49.86	
5	Irena Petříková	Czech Republic	35:11.77	
6	Jade Wright	United Kingdom	35:12.94	
7	Marzena Kłuczyńska	Poland	36:27.84	

== Participation ==
According to an unofficial count, 7 athletes from 7 countries participated in the event.

- Belarus (1)
- Czech Republic (1)
- Germany (1)
- Poland (1)
- Romania (1)
- Russia (1)
- United Kingdom (1)
