= Athletics at the 2005 Summer Universiade – Women's 1500 metres =

The women's 1500 metres event at the 2005 Summer Universiade was held on 16–18 August in İzmir, Turkey.

The winning margin was 0.04 seconds which as of 2024 is the narrowest winning margin in the women's 1500 metres at these games.

== Medalists ==
| Gold | Silver | Bronze |
|---|---|---|
| Olesya Syreva; Russia | Tetyana Holovchenko; Ukraine | Liu Qing; China |

== Results ==
=== Heats ===
| Rank | Heat | Athlete | Nationality | Time | Notes |
|---|---|---|---|---|---|
| 1 | 1 | Lisa Dobriskey | Great Britain | 4:12.38 | Q |
| 2 | 1 | Liu Qing | China | 4:13.50 | Q |
| 3 | 1 | Hilary Stellingwerff | Canada | 4:14.05 | Q |
| 4 | 1 | Mariem Alaoui Selsouli | Morocco | 4:15.64 | q |
| 5 | 1 | Jolene Byrne | Ireland | 4:15.64 | q |
| 6 | 3 | Olesya Syreva | Russia | 4:17.25 | Q |
| 7 | 3 | Sviatlana Kouhan | Belarus | 4:17.35 | Q |
| 8 | 3 | Tetyana Holovchenko | Ukraine | 4:18.21 | Q |
| 9 | 3 | Rebecca Forlong | New Zealand | 4:20.12 | q |
| 10 | 2 | Sonja Stolić | Serbia and Montenegro | 4:22.04 | Q |
| 11 | 2 | Sonja Roman | Slovenia | 4:23.47 | Q |
| 12 | 2 | Sara Palmas | Italy | 4:25.36 | Q |
| 13 | 2 | Darolyn Trembath | Canada | 4:26.17 | |
| 14 | 3 | Arzu Berk | Turkey | 4:26.36 | |
| 15 | 3 | Marilena Sophocleous | Cyprus | 4:27.12 | NJR |
| 16 | 3 | Grace Ebor | Nigeria | 4:28.17 | |
| 17 | 2 | Rini Budiarti | Indonesia | 4:30.70 | |
| 18 | 1 | Louise Mørch | Denmark | 4:33.59 | |
| 19 | 2 | Gabriela Traña | Costa Rica | 4:38.30 | |
| 20 | 2 | Akuvi Degbotse-Goe | Togo | 5:10.61 | |
| 21 | 2 | Fati Larley | Ghana | 5:14.71 | |
| 22 | 3 | Argianany Nahr | Netherlands Antilles | 5:33.26 | |
| | 1 | Lívia Tóth | Hungary | DNF | |

=== Final ===
| Rank | Athlete | Nationality | Time | Notes |
|---|---|---|---|---|
| 1st place, gold medalist(s) | Olesya Syreva | Russia | 4:12.69 | |
| 2nd place, silver medalist(s) | Tetyana Holovchenko | Ukraine | 4:12.73 | |
| 3rd place, bronze medalist(s) | Liu Qing | China | 4:12.76 | |
| 4 | Sviatlana Kouhan | Belarus | 4:13.06 | |
| 5 | Lisa Dobriskey | Great Britain | 4:13.28 | |
| 6 | Jolene Byrne | Ireland | 4:14.32 | |
| 7 | Hilary Stellingwerff | Canada | 4:16.78 | |
| 8 | Sonja Stolić | Serbia and Montenegro | 4:17.57 | |
| 9 | Sonja Roman | Slovenia | 4:18.71 | |
| 10 | Mariem Alaoui Selsouli | Morocco | 4:18.81 | |
| 11 | Rebecca Forlong | New Zealand | 4:22.78 | |
| 12 | Sara Palmas | Italy | 4:25.61 | |
