= 2003 European Athletics U23 Championships – Women's 5000 metres =

The women's 5000 metres event at the 2003 European Athletics U23 Championships was held in Bydgoszcz, Poland, at Zawisza Stadion on 20 July.

== Medalists ==
Gold	Elvan Abeylegesse; Turkey
Silver	Tatyana Petrova; Russia
Bronze	Sonia Bejarano; Spain

== Results ==
=== Final ===
20 July

Rank	Name	Nationality	Time	Notes
1st place, gold medalist(s)	Elvan Abeylegesse	Turkey	15:16.79	CR
2nd place, silver medalist(s)	Tatyana Petrova	Russia	16:02.79	
3rd place, bronze medalist(s)	Sonia Bejarano	Spain	16:17.81	
4	Krisztina Papp	Hungary	16:21.76	
5	Ulla Tuimala	Finland	16:25.20	
6	Linda Hadjar	France	16:26.51	
7	Ágnes Kroneraff	Hungary	16:46.27	
8	Oksana Sklyarenko	Ukraine	17:14.85	
	Volha Krautsova	Belarus	DNF	
	Jéssica Augusto	Portugal	DNF	
	Daniela Kuleska	North Macedonia	DNS	

== Participation ==
According to an unofficial count, 10 athletes from 9 countries participated in the event.

- Belarus (1)
- Finland (1)
- France (1)
- Hungary (2)
- Portugal (1)
- Russia (1)
- Spain (1)
- Turkey (1)
- Ukraine (1)
