= Tetyana Holovchenko =

Ukrainian athlete

Tetyana Holovchenko or Tetiana Holovchenko (Ukrainian: Тетяна Головченко; born 13 February 1980, Okhtyrka) is a Ukrainian middle/long-distance runner who specializes in the 1500 and 3000 metres.

== Achievements ==
Year	Competition	Venue	Position	Event	Notes
Representing Ukraine
2001	European U23 Championships	Amsterdam, Netherlands	14th	5000 m	16:44.16
2005	European Indoor Championships	Madrid, Spain	8th	3000 m	9:10.09
2005	Universiade	İzmir, Turkey	2nd	1500 m	4:12.73
2005	Universiade	İzmir, Turkey	2nd	5000 m	15:44.92
2006	World Indoor Championships	Moscow, Russia	11th	3000 m	9:08.24
2006	European Championships	Gothenburg, Sweden	10th	1500 m	4:05.53
2006	European Cross Country Championships	San Giorgio su Legnano, Italy	1st	Senior Race	25:17
2007	Universiade	Bangkok, Thailand	2nd	1500 m	4:10.46
2007	Universiade	Bangkok, Thailand	2nd	5000 m	15:40.56
2007	World Championships	Osaka, Japan	20th (sf)	1500 m	4:17.97
2011	World Championships	Daegu, South Korea	33rd	Marathon	2:39:25
2012	European Championships	Helsinki, Finland	12th	10,000 m	33:18.15

=== Personal bests ===
- 800 metres - 2:00.81 min (2004)
- 1500 metres - 4:05.01 min (2006)
- 3000 metres - 8:50.67 min (2004)
- 5000 metres - 15:26.88 min (2007)
