= Yelizaveta Grechishnikova =

Russian long-distance runner

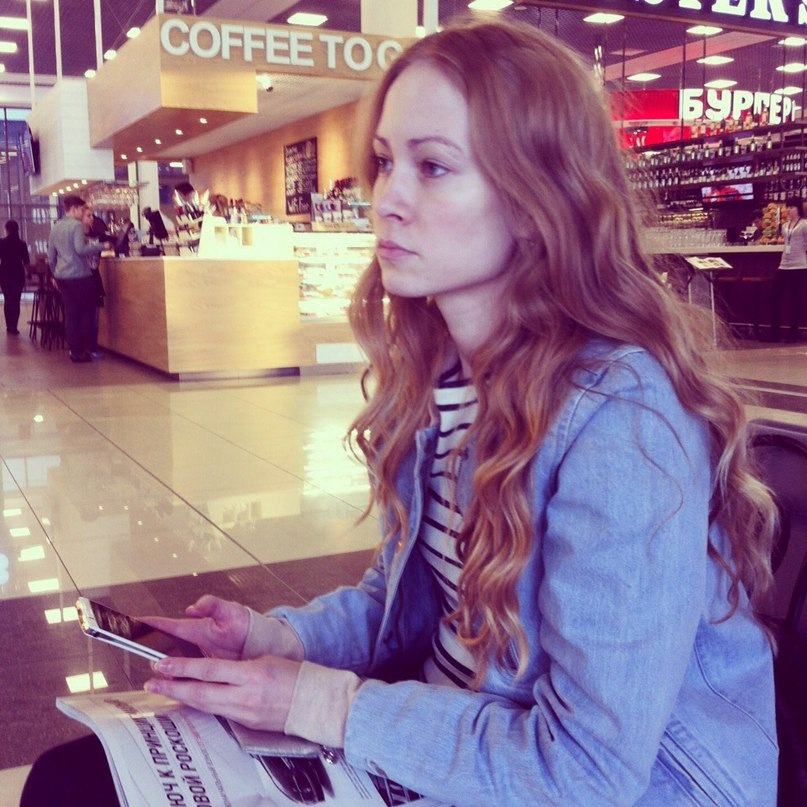

Personal information
- Native name: Елизавета Андриановна Гречишникова
- Full name: Yelizaveta Andrianovna Grechishnikova
- Nationality: Russia
- Born: 12 December 1983 (age 42) Ufa, Russia

Sport
- Sport: Long-distance track event

Yelizaveta Andrianovna Grechishnikova (Russian: Елизавета Андриановна Гречишникова; born 12 December 1983) is a Russian long-distance runner. She represented Russia in the 5000 metres at the World Championships in Athletics in 2009 and 2011. She was eighth in the event at the 2010 European Athletics Championships.

Born in Mordovia, her first medal came at the 2007 Summer Universiade, where she was the 5000 m bronze medallist. Grechishnikova won her first national title at the Russian Indoor Championships in 2010. She took her first outdoor title two years later over 10,000 metres at the IAAF Moscow Challenge meeting.

On 25 October 2013 the Russian Anti-Doping Agency suspended her until 15 October 2015 and voided all her performances since 18 August 2009.

== Achievements ==
Year	Competition	Venue	Position	Event	Notes
Representing Russia
2007	Universiade	Bangkok, Thailand	3rd	5000 m	15:50.58
2009	World Championships	Berlin, Germany	Disqualified	5000 m	15:53.41
2010	European Championships	Barcelona, Spain	Disqualified	5000 m	15:16.19
2011	World Championships	Daegu, South Korea	Disqualified	5000 m	15:45.61
