= Silvia Weissteiner =

Italian long-distance runner

Personal information
- Born: 13 July 1979 (age 47) Sterzing, Italy
- Height: 1.63 m (5 ft 4 in)
- Weight: 46 kg (101 lb)

Sport
- Country: Italy
- Sport: Athletics
- Event: Long-distance running
- Club: G.S. Forestale

Achievements and titles
- Personal bests: 3000 m: 3:44.81 (2007); 5000 m: 15:02.85 (2007)
Medal record
| Event | 1st | 2nd | 3rd |
|---|---|---|---|
| European Indoor Championships | 0 | 0 | 1 |
| Mediterranean Games | 0 | 1 | 2 |
| European Cup | 0 | 1 | 0 |

Silvia Weissteiner (born 13 July 1979 in Sterzing/Vipiteno) is an Italian long-distance runner.

== Biography ==
She is a two-time national champion in the women's 5000 metres. She represented Italy at the 2008 Summer Olympics, the 2012 Summer Olympics, and at the World Championships in Athletics in 2007 and 2009. Weissteiner was the runner-up at the European Cup 10000m in 2006 behind Elvan Abeylegesse. She won her first major continental medal at the 2007 European Athletics Indoor Championships. Her bronze medal performance with a run of 8:44.81 was a new Italian indoor record, marking an improvement of over twelve seconds for the distance.

She has enjoyed success at the Mediterranean Games, having won consecutive 5000 m bronze medals at the 2005 and 2009 editions. She won a 3000 m silver medal at the 2008 European Athletics Indoor Cup and took an outdoor silver over 5000 m at the 2009 European Team Championships. In 2011, she narrowly missed the 3000 m final at the 2011 European Athletics Indoor Championships, was fifth over the distance at the 2011 European Team Championships and was the Italian champion over 5000 m. She ran at the BOClassic New Year's Eve race in Bolzano and was the first European to cross the line, taking third behind Vivian Cheruiyot and Afera Godfay.

== Achievements ==
| Year | Competition | Venue | Position | Event | Notes |
Representing Italy
| 2001 | European U23 Championships | Amsterdam, Netherlands | 8th | 5000 m | 16:05.42 |
| 2001 | Mediterranean Games | Radès, Tunisia | 5th | 5000 m | 16:06.38 |
| 2002 | European Championships | Munich, Germany | 13th | 5000 m | 15:58.92 |
| 2005 | European Indoor Championships | Madrid, Spain | 4th | 3000 m | 8:56.27 |
| 2005 | Mediterranean Games | Almería, Spain | 3rd | 5000 m | 15:28.50 |
| 2006 | European Championships | Gothenburg, Sweden | 14th | 10,000 m | 32:09.26 |
| 2007 | European Indoor Championships | Birmingham, United Kingdom | 3rd | 3000 m | 8:44.81 (NR) |
| 2007 | World Championships | Osaka, Japan | 12th | 5000 m | 15:11.81 |
| 2008 | World Indoor Championships | Valencia, Spain | 7th | 3000 m | 8:49.11 |
| 2008 | Olympic Games | Beijing, China | 21st (h) | 5000 m | 15:23.45 |
| 2009 | European Indoor Championships | Paris, France | 13th (h) | 3000 m | 9:05.60 |
| 2009 | Mediterranean Games | Pescara, Italy | 3rd | 5000 m | 15:15.95 |
| 2009 | World Championships | Berlin, Germany | 7th | 5000 m | 15:09.74 |
| 2011 | European Indoor Championships | Paris, France | 12th (h) | 3000 m | 9:19.96 |
| 2012 | World Indoor Championships | Istanbul, Turkey | 10th (h) | 3000 m | 9:08.41 |
| 2012 | European Championships | Helsinki, Finland | 15th | 5000 m | 15:39.23 |
| 2012 | Olympic Games | London, United Kingdom | 16th (h) | 5000 m | 15:06.81 |
| 2013 | Mediterranean Games | Mersin, Turkey | 2nd | 5000 m | 15:44.53 |

== National titles ==
Silvia Weissteiner has won the individual national championship 17 times.

- 1 win in the 1500 metres: 2007
- 4 wins in the 5000 metres: 2005, 2006, 2011, 2012
- 5 wins in the cross country running: 2003 (short race), 2006, 2008, 2009, 2012
- 7 wins in the 3000 metres indoor: 2005, 2006, 2007, 2008, 2011, 2012, 2013

== Personal bests ==
- 1500 metres - 4:12.30 min (2007)
- 3000 metres - 8:48.63 min (2007) - indoor: 8:44.81 min (2007, national record)
- 5000 metres - 15:02.65 min (2007)
- 10,000 metres - 32:09.26 min (2006)

== See also ==
- Italian all-time top lists - 5000 metres
- Italian all-time top lists - 10000 metres
