= 2002 World Junior Championships in Athletics – Women's 1500 metres =

The women's 1500 metres event at the 2002 World Junior Championships in Athletics was held in Kingston, Jamaica, at National Stadium on 19 and 21 July.

== Medalists ==
Gold	Viola Kibiwot; Kenya
Silver	Berhane Herpassa; Ethiopia
Bronze	Olesya Syreva; Russia

== Results ==
=== Final ===
21 July

Rank	Name	Nationality	Time	Notes
1st place, gold medalist(s)	Viola Kibiwot	Kenya	4:12.57	
2nd place, silver medalist(s)	Berhane Herpassa	Ethiopia	4:13.59	
3rd place, bronze medalist(s)	Olesya Syreva	Russia	4:14.32	
4	Lisa Dobriskey	United Kingdom	4:14.72	
5	Mariem Alaoui Selsouli	Morocco	4:16.08	
6	Amel Tlili	Tunisia	4:16.18	
7	Tatyana Rasputina	Russia	4:16.39	
8	Ji Siyu	China	4:17.32	
9	Inna Poluškina	Latvia	4:18.68	
10	Pamela Kipchoge	Kenya	4:20.14	
11	Katharina Splinter	Germany	4:22.55	
12	Naoual Baiby	Morocco	4:25.43	

=== Heats ===
19 July

==== Heat 1 ====
Rank	Name	Nationality	Time	Notes
1	Viola Kibiwot	Kenya	4:20.93	Q
2	Berhane Herpassa	Ethiopia	4:21.16	Q
3	Tatyana Rasputina	Russia	4:21.27	Q
4	Katharina Splinter	Germany	4:21.70	Q
5	Mariem Alaoui Selsouli	Morocco	4:22.29	q
6	Amel Tlili	Tunisia	4:22.89	q
7	Katrina Wootton	United Kingdom	4:24.04	
8	Kathryn Andersen	United States	4:24.77	
9	Lemlem Bereket	Eritrea	4:25.68	
10	Zita Mezei	Hungary	4:26.32	

==== Heat 2 ====
Rank	Name	Nationality	Time	Notes
1	Lisa Dobriskey	United Kingdom	4:19.83	Q
2	Naoual Baiby	Morocco	4:20.34	Q
3	Pamela Kipchoge	Kenya	4:20.93	Q
4	Olesya Syreva	Russia	4:21.10	Q
5	Inna Poluškina	Latvia	4:21.80	q
6	Ji Siyu	China	4:21.84	q
7	Antje Möldner	Germany	4:23.66	
8	Corina Dumbrăvean	Romania	4:26.61	
9	Georgie Clarke	Australia	4:32.93	
10	Nicola Maye	Jamaica	4:40.61	
11	Puseletso Khakae	Lesotho	4:50.29	

== Participation ==
According to an unofficial count, 21 athletes from 16 countries participated in the event.

- Australia (1)
- China (1)
- Eritrea (1)
- Ethiopia (1)
- Germany (2)
- Hungary (1)
- Jamaica (1)
- Kenya (2)
- Latvia (1)
- Lesotho (1)
- Morocco (2)
- Romania (1)
- Russia (2)
- Tunisia (1)
- United Kingdom (2)
- United States (1)
