= Tatyana Petrova Arkhipova =

Russian long-distance runner (born 1983)

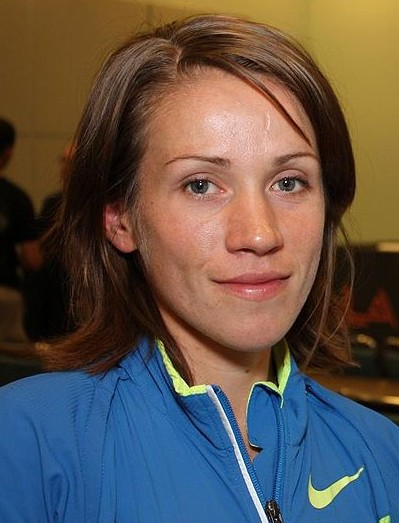
- Petrova Arkhipova before the 2009 Los Angeles Marathon

Personal information
- Born: 8 April 1983 (age 43) Urmarsky District, Chuvash ASSR, Russian SFSR, Soviet Union
- Height: 1.59 m (5 ft 2 1/2 in)
- Weight: 49 kg (108 lb)

Sport
- Country: Russia
- Sport: Women's athletics
- Event: Marathon
Medal record
Olympic Games
Bronze medal – third place	2008 Beijing	3000 meters steeplechase
Bronze medal – third place	2012 London	Marathon
World Championships
Silver medal – second place	2007 Osaka	3000 m steeplechase

Tatyana Petrova Arkhipova (Russian: Татьяна Петрова Архипова; born 8 April 1983 in Urmarsky District, Chuvashia as Tatyana Valeriyevna Petrova) is a Russian runner. She is a former specialist in the 3000 metres steeplechase, and won a bronze medal at the 2008 Beijing Olympics. She later moved up to marathon and won the Olympic bronze medal in that event at the 2012 London Games.

== Running career ==
As a junior, Petrova finished nineteenth at the 2001 European Cross Country Championships and reached the finals of both the 3000 metres and 5000 metres at the 2002 World Junior Championships in Athletics.

Petrova won the 5000 metres silver medal at the 2003 European Athletics U23 Championships, finishing behind Turkish runner Elvan Abeylegesse. She returned to the event in 2005 but was beaten by Binnaz Uslu. She won the gold medal in 10,000 metres at the same meet.

Petrova began competing in road running events and took back-to-back wins at the Monument Avenue 10K from 2004 and 2005. She made her marathon debut in December 2004, coming fifth at the Honolulu Marathon. She was eighth at the 2005 Chicago Marathon and improved her best to 2:31:03.

A switch to focus on the steeplechase event proved highly successful for Petrova, as in her first year she ran a world best indoors for the 3000 m steeplechase and took the silver medal outdoors at the 2006 European Championships, finishing behind Alesia Turava. The following year she took the steeplechase silver at the 2007 World Championships (in a personal best time of 9:09.19 minutes) and came close to a medal at the 2008 Beijing Olympics, taking fourth behind Russian teammates Gulnara Samitova-Galkina and Yekaterina Volkova and Eunice Jepkorir of Kenya who took silver.

Her focus switched back to marathon running in 2009, as she ran a personal best of 2:25:53 for fourth at the Dubai Marathon and then won the Los Angeles Marathon in May. She did not run in 2010 but returned in good form with a third-place finish at the 2011 Tokyo Marathon in February and a fifth-place finish (2:25:01) in Berlin in September.

Arkhipova competed in the 2012 Olympic Marathon in London under her married name. She ran the first half conservatively and caught up to the leaders at about 30 kilometres. She stayed with them until the final kilometre, when she fell back into bronze medal position and ended up finishing third in a personal best of 2:23:29.

== International competitions ==
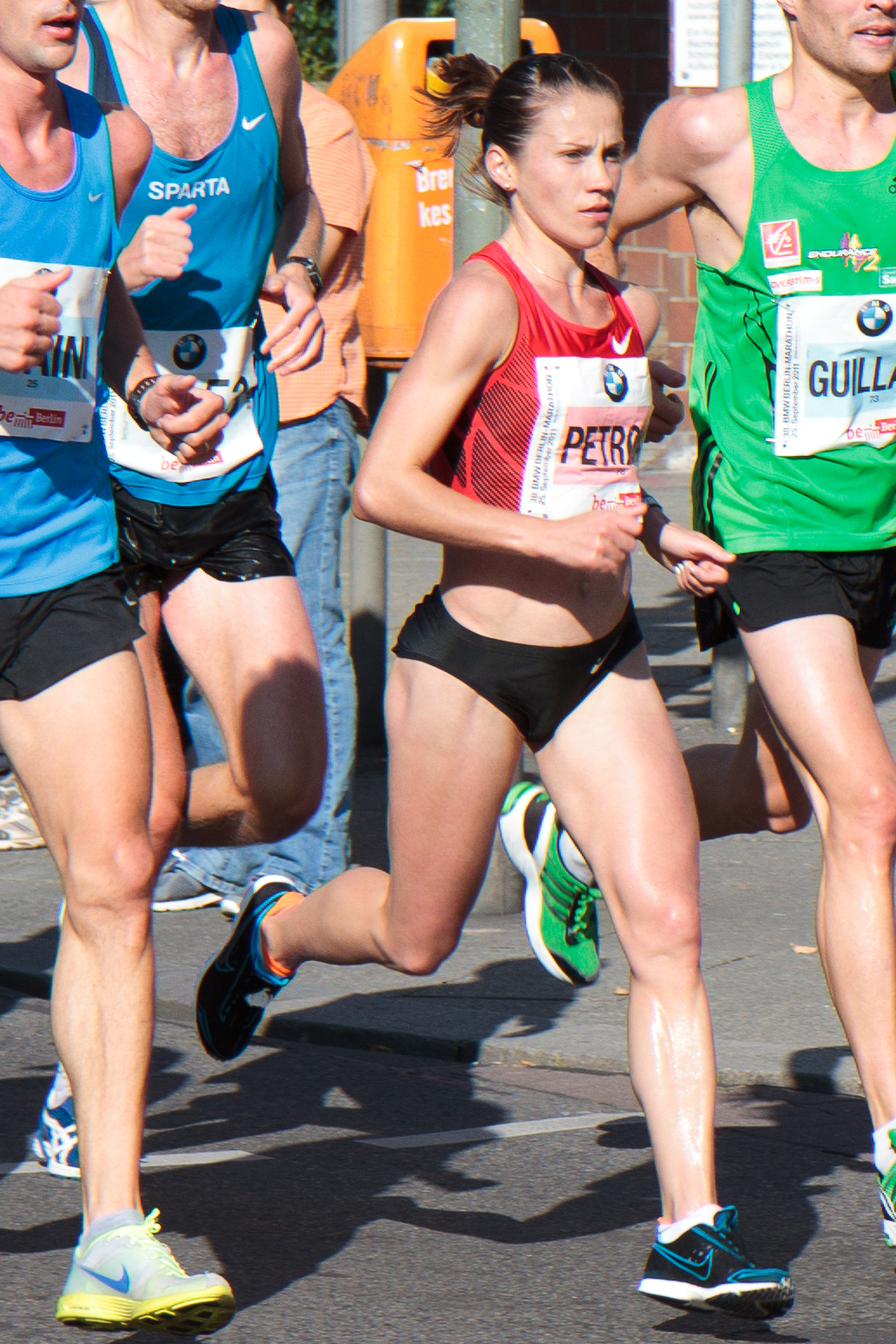
Petrova Arkhipova at the 2011 Berlin Marathon

Representing Russia
Year	Competition	Venue	Position	Event	Result	Notes
2002	World Junior Championships	Kingston, Jamaica	4th	3000 m	9:17.83	
2002	World Junior Championships	Kingston, Jamaica	6th	5000 m	16:04.10	
2003	European U23 Championships	Bydgoszcz, Poland	2nd	5000 m	16:02.79	
2005	European U23 Championships	Erfurt, Germany	2nd	5000 m	16:01.79	
2005	European U23 Championships	Erfurt, Germany	1st	10,000 m	33:55.99	
2006	European Championships	Gothenburg, Sweden	2nd	3000 m s'chase	9:28.05	
2006	World Cup	Athens, Greece	5th	3000 m s'chase	9:36.50	
2007	World Championships	Osaka, Japan	2nd	3000 m s'chase	9:09.19	
2008	Olympic Games	Beijing, China	3rd	3000 m s'chase	9:12.33	
2009	Los Angeles Marathon	Los Angeles, United States	1st	Marathon	2:25:59	
2012	Olympic Games	London, United Kingdom	3rd	Marathon	2:23:29	

== Personal bests ==
- 3000 metres – 8:44.13 min (2006)
- 3000 metres steeplechase – 9:09.19 min (2007)
- 5000 metres – 15:46.58 min (2003)
- 10,000 metres – 32:17.49 min (2005)
- Marathon – 2:23:29 hrs (2012)

== See also ==
- List of Olympic medalists in athletics (women)
- List of 2012 Summer Olympics medal winners
- List of World Athletics Championships medalists (women)
- Steeplechase at the Olympics
- Marathons at the Olympics
- Steeplechase at the World Championships in Athletics
