= 2005 European Athletics U23 Championships – Women's 5000 metres =

The women's 5000 metres event at the 2005 European Athletics U23 Championships was held in Erfurt, Germany, at Steigerwaldstadion on 17 July.

== Medalists ==
Gold	Binnaz Uslu; Turkey
Silver	Tatyana Petrova; Russia
Bronze	Silvia La Barbera; Italy

== Results ==
=== Final ===
17 July

Rank	Name	Nationality	Time	Notes
1st place, gold medalist(s)	Binnaz Uslu	Turkey	15:57.21	
2nd place, silver medalist(s)	Tatyana Petrova	Russia	16:01.79	
3rd place, bronze medalist(s)	Silvia La Barbera	Italy	16:07.01	
4	Volha Minina	Belarus	16:15.97	
5	Barbara La Barbera	Italy	16:22.17	
6	Eleanor Baker	United Kingdom	16:22.51	
7	Adriënne Herzog	Netherlands	16:26.84	
8	Inna Poluškina	Latvia	16:29.19	
9	Liesbeth Van de Velde	Belgium	16:30.37	
10	Miriam Ortiz	Spain	16:34.64	
11	Anke Van Campen	Belgium	16:53.66	
	Marta Fernández	Spain	DNF	

== Participation ==
According to an unofficial count, 12 athletes from 9 countries participated in the event.

- Belarus (1)
- Belgium (2)
- Italy (2)
- Latvia (1)
- Netherlands (1)
- Russia (1)
- Spain (2)
- Turkey (1)
- United Kingdom (1)
