= Inna Poluškina =

Latvian long-distance runner

Personal information
- Nationality: Latvian
- Born: 7 July 1984 (age 42) Riga, Latvian SSR, Soviet Union
- Occupation: Long-distance runner

Inna Poluškina (born 7 July 1984, in Riga) is a Latvian long-distance runner who specialises in the 3000 metres.

== Biography ==
Poluškina has won championships in the 1500 m, 3000 m, 5000 m, 10,000 m and half marathon categories.

In 2008, she set Latvian record in 3000 m steeplechase and did Olympic B normative.

== Achievements ==
Year	Competition	Venue	Position	Event	Notes
Representing Latvia
2001	World Youth Championships	Debrecen, Hungary	4th	1500 m	4:19.65
2002	World Junior Championships	Kingston, Jamaica	9th	1500 m	4:18.68
2002	World Junior Championships	Kingston, Jamaica	6th	3000 m	9:22.24
2003	World Athletics Final	Monte Carlo, Monaco	8th	3000 m	9:04.23
2005	European U23 Championships	Erfurt, Germany	8th	5000m	16:29.19
2007	Universiade	Bangkok, Thailand	4th	1500 m	4:12.23
2008	Olympic Games	Beijing, China	45th (h)	3000 m steeplechase	10:18.60

=== Personal bests ===
Event	Record	Venue	Year
1500 metres	4:10.85	Kaunas, Lithuania	2003
3000 metres	8:50.69	Riga, Latvia	2003
5000 metres	15:22.43	Riga, Latvia	2003
10,000 metres	33:22.7 min	Riga, Latvia	2003
3000 metres steeplechase	9:51.56	Ventspils, Latvia	2008
