= 2001 European Athletics U23 Championships – Women's 5000 metres =

The women's 5000 metres event at the 2001 European Athletics U23 Championships was held in Amsterdam, Netherlands, at Olympisch Stadion on 14 July.

== Medalists ==
Gold	Katalin Szentgyörgyi; Hungary
Silver	Anastasiya Zubova; Russia
Bronze	Tatyana Khmelyova; Russia

== Results ==
=== Final ===
14 July

Rank	Name	Nationality	Time	Notes
1st place, gold medalist(s)	Katalin Szentgyörgyi	Hungary	15:40.55	
2nd place, silver medalist(s)	Anastasiya Zubova	Russia	15:40.78	
3rd place, bronze medalist(s)	Tatyana Khmelyova	Russia	15:51.88	
4	Inês Monteiro	Portugal	15:57.03	
5	Sonja Stolić	Yugoslavia	15:58.47	
6	Lyudmila Volchik	Belarus	16:01.30	
7	Juliet Potter	United Kingdom	16:02.99	
8	Silvia Weissteiner	Italy	16:05.42	
9	Melanie Schulz	Germany	16:05.52	
10	Sabrina Mockenhaupt	Germany	16:05.61	
11	Sonia Bejarano	Spain	16:10.42	
12	Gillian Palmer	United Kingdom	16:18.68	
13	Ionela Bungărdean	Romania	16:26.58	
14	Tatyana Golovchenko	Ukraine	16:44.16	
15	Karen Hind	United Kingdom	16:47.11	

== Participation ==
According to an unofficial count, 15 athletes from 11 countries participated in the event.

- Belarus (1)
- Germany (2)
- Hungary (1)
- Italy (1)
- Portugal (1)
- Romania (1)
- Russia (2)
- Spain (1)
- Ukraine (1)
- United Kingdom (3)
- Yugoslavia (1)
