= Olesya Syreva =

Russian runner

Olesya Syreva (Russian: Олеся Сырева; b. 25 November 1983 in Novosibirsk) is a Russian middle/long-distance runner who specializes in the 1500 and 3000 metres. On the February 3rd 2013 she was banned for two years by the IAAF following irregularities on her biological passport. All her results since March 3, 2011 were voided.

Syreva served a second ban for eight years between 2016 and 2024 for testing positive for metenolone.

== International competitions ==
Year	Competition	Venue	Position	Event	Result	Notes
2002	World Junior Championships	Kingston, Jamaica	3rd	1500 m	4:14.32	
2002	World Junior Championships	Kingston, Jamaica	3rd	3000 m	9:16.58	
2005	European U23 Championships	Erfurt, Germany	2nd	1500m	4:16.23	
2005	Universiade	İzmir, Turkey	1st	1500 m	4:12.69	
2006	World Indoor Championships	Moscow, Russia	5th	3000 m	8:44.10	
2011	European Indoor Championships	Paris, France	2nd (DQ)	3000 m	DQ	Doping
2011	World Championships	Daegu, South Korea	9th sf (DQ)	1500 m	DQ	Doping

== Personal bests ==
- 800 metres - 2:03.69 min (2005)
- 1500 metres - 4:06.47 min (2006)
- 3000 metres - 8:55.09 min (2008)
- 5000 metres - 15:19.96 min (2008)
- Half marathon - 1:09:52 min (2008)

== See also ==
- List of doping cases in athletics
