= Renata Pliś =

Polish middle-distance runner

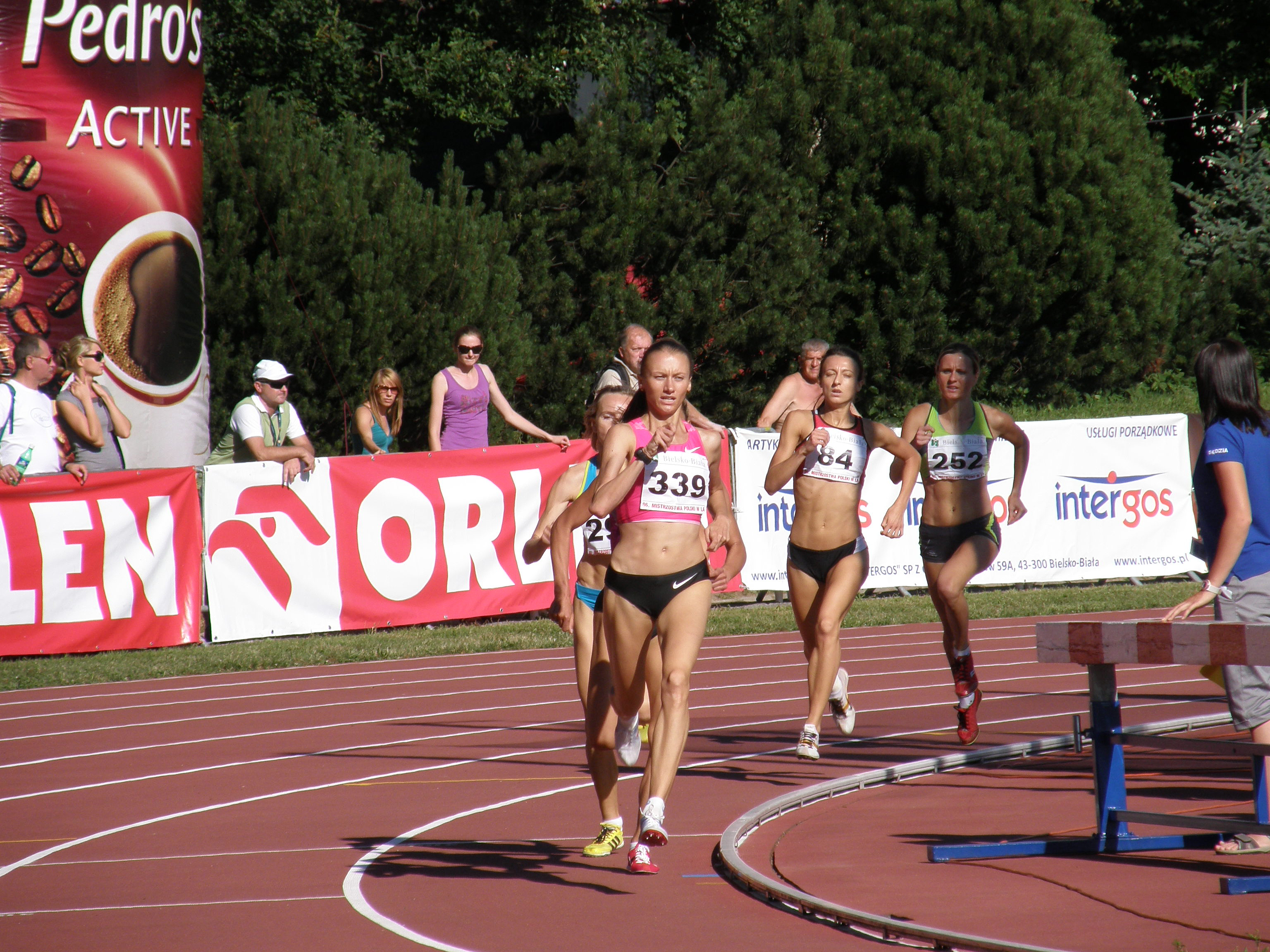
- Renata Pliś (339) in 2010

Personal information
- Nationality: Poland
- Born: 5 February 1985 (age 41) Wrocław, Poland
- Height: 1.72 m (5 ft 7 1/2 in)
- Weight: 53 kg (117 lb) (2012)

Sport
- Sport: Athletics
- Events: 800 m, 1500 m
- Club: MKL Maraton Świnoujście
- Coached by: Janusz Walkowiak

Renata Pliś (born 5 February 1985) is a Polish runner who specializes in the middle distance events.

== Competition record ==
Year	Competition	Venue	Position	Event	Notes
Representing Poland
2005	European U23 Championships	Erfurt, Germany	11th	1500 m	4:24.00
2010	World Indoor Championships	Doha, Qatar	16th (h)	3000 m	9:02.68
2010	European Team Championships	Bergen, Norway	2nd	3000 m	9:08.94
2010	European Championships	Barcelona, Spain	14th (h)	1500 m	4:07.20
2011	European Indoor Championships	Paris, France	4th	1500 m	4:15.16
2011	World Championships	Daegu, South Korea	20th (sf)	1500 m	4:11.12
2012	Olympic Games	London, United Kingdom	43rd (h)	1500 m	4:19.62
2013	World Championships	Moscow, Russia	16th (sf)	1500 m	4:08.02
2014	World Indoor Championships	Sopot, Poland	7th	3000 m	9:07.05
2014	European Championships	Zürich, Switzerland	4th	1500 m	4:06.65
2014	European Championships	Zürich, Switzerland	12th	5000 m	15:48.58
2015	European Indoor Championships	Prague, Czech Republic	8th	1500 m	4:16.96
2015	World Championships	Beijing, China	11th (sf)	1500 m	4:15.10
2016	World Indoor Championships	Portland, United States	7th	1500 m	4:10.14

== Personal bests ==
Outdoor

- 800 metres – 2:00.45 (Zagreb 2010)
- 1000 metres – 2:37.89 (Warsaw 2011)
- 1500 metres – 4:03.50 (Brussels 2011)
- One Mile – 4:25.32 (Brussels 2015)
- 3000 metres – 8:39.18 (Brussels 2014)
- 5000 metres – 15:18.75 (Liège 2014)
- 10 kilometres – 33:07 (Warsaw 2015)

Indoor

- 800 metres – 2:03.12 (Toruń 2015)
- 1000 metres – 2:39.22 (Spała 2016)
- 1500 metres – 4:07.10 (Stockholm 2011)
- 3000 metres – 8:50.75 (Glasgow 2016)
