= 2002 World Junior Championships in Athletics – Women's 3000 metres =

The women's 3000 metres event at the 2002 World Junior Championships in Athletics was held in Kingston, Jamaica, at National Stadium on 16 July.

== Medalists ==
Gold	Meseret Defar; Ethiopia
Silver	Mariem Alaoui Selsouli; Morocco
Bronze	Olesya Syreva; Russia

== Results ==
=== Final ===
16 July

Rank	Name	Nationality	Time	Notes
1st place, gold medalist(s)	Meseret Defar	Ethiopia	9:12.61	
2nd place, silver medalist(s)	Mariem Alaoui Selsouli	Morocco	9:16.28	
3rd place, bronze medalist(s)	Olesya Syreva	Russia	9:16.58	
4	Tatyana Petrova	Russia	9:17.83	
5	Machi Tanaka	Japan	9:19.95	
6	Inna Poluškina	Latvia	9:22.24	
7	Peninah Chepchumba	Kenya	9:22.38	
8	Chemutai Rionotukei	Kenya	9:25.89	
9	Sónia Fernandes	Portugal	9:28.83	
10	Adrienne Herzog	Netherlands	9:31.15	
11	Elina Lindgren	Finland	9:32.90	
12	Zita Mezei	Hungary	9:33.85	
13	Zhang Yang	China	9:34.04	
14	Etalemahu Kidane	Ethiopia	9:36.83	
15	Sara Bei	United States	9:38.92	
16	Nancy Frouin	France	9:46.03	
17	Stefanie Murer	Switzerland	9:49.34	
18	Esther Schrijvers	Netherlands	10:00.37	
19	Lindsay Zinn	United States	10:08.17	
	Snežana Kostic	Yugoslavia	DNF	

== Participation ==
According to an unofficial count, 20 athletes from 15 countries participated in the event.

- China (1)
- Ethiopia (2)
- Finland (1)
- France (1)
- Hungary (1)
- Japan (1)
- Kenya (2)
- Latvia (1)
- Morocco (1)
- Netherlands (2)
- Portugal (1)
- Russia (2)
- Switzerland (1)
- United States (2)
- Yugoslavia (1)
