= 2005 European Athletics U23 Championships – Women's 1500 metres =

The women's 1500 metres event at the 2005 European Athletics U23 Championships was held in Erfurt, Germany, at Steigerwaldstadion on 16 July.

== Medalists ==
Gold	Corina Dumbrăvean; Romania
Silver	Olesya Syreva; Russia
Bronze	Antje Möldner; Germany

== Results ==
=== Final ===
16 July

Rank	Name	Nationality	Time	Notes
1st place, gold medalist(s)	Corina Dumbrăvean	Romania	4:14.78	
2nd place, silver medalist(s)	Olesya Syreva	Russia	4:16.23	
3rd place, bronze medalist(s)	Antje Möldner	Germany	4:16.34	
4	Nelya Neporadna	Ukraine	4:16.54	
5	Natalya Pantelyeva	Russia	4:17.21	
6	Isabel Macías	Spain	4:17.66	
7	Katrina Wootton	United Kingdom	4:18.67	
8	Katrin Judith Trauth	Germany	4:19.32	
9	Hélène Guet	France	4:20.16	
10	Simona Barcău	Romania	4:21.81	
11	Renata Pliś	Poland	4:24.00	
12	Johanna Nilsson	Sweden	4:25.79	

== Participation ==
According to an unofficial count, 12 athletes from 9 countries participated in the event.

- France (1)
- Germany (2)
- Poland (1)
- Romania (2)
- Russia (2)
- Spain (1)
- Sweden (1)
- Ukraine (1)
- United Kingdom (1)
