= San Giorgio su Legnano =

- Comune
- Comune di San Giorgio su Legnano
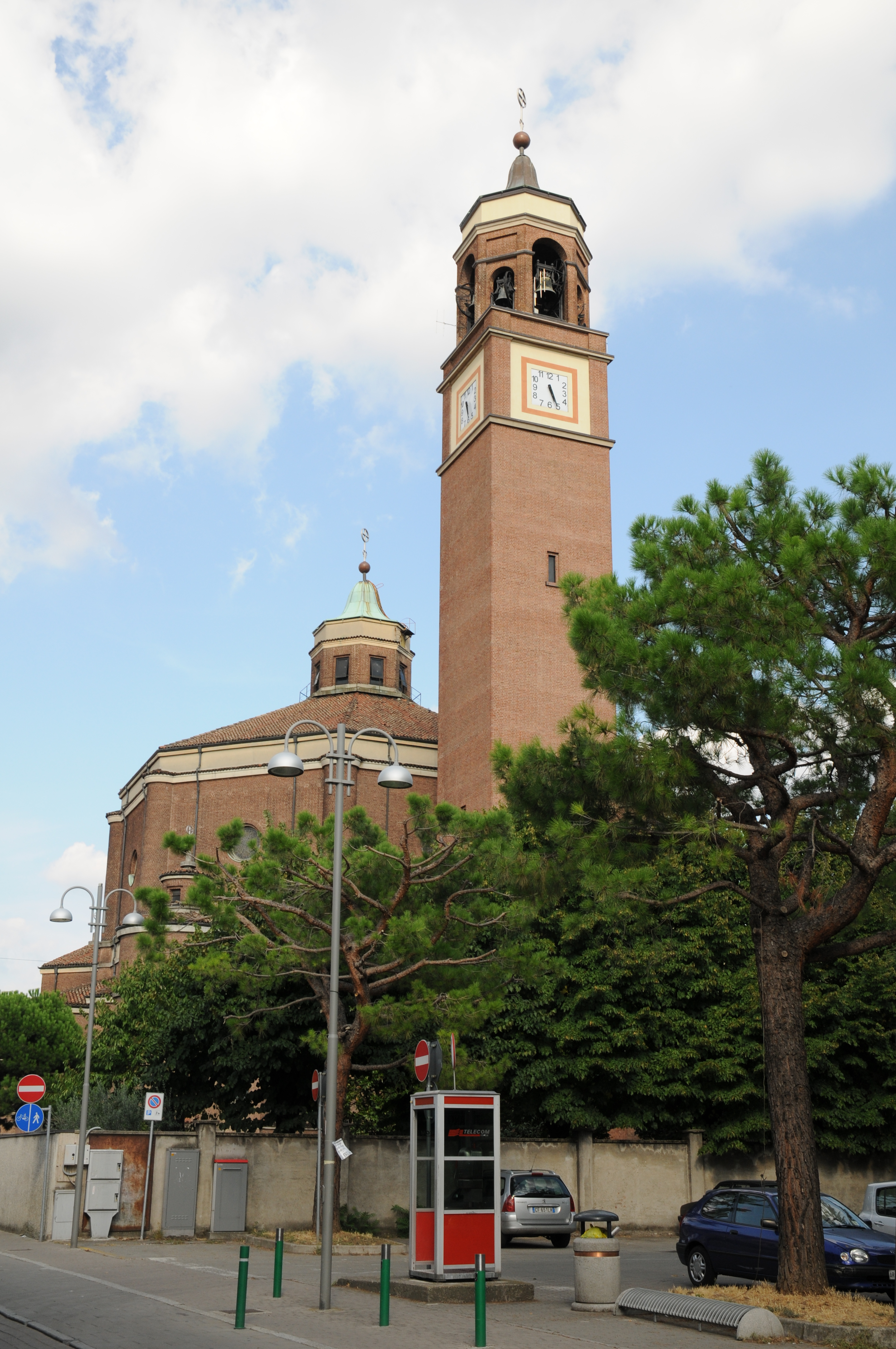

- Coat of arms

- Location within Italy Location within Lombardy
- Coordinates: 45°34′N 8°55′E
- Country: Italy
- Region: Lombardy
- Metropolitan city: Milan (MI)

Government
  - Mayor: Walter Cecchin

Area
  - Total: 2.17 km^{2} (0.84 sq mi)
- Elevation: 198 m (650 ft)

Population (28 February 2017)
  - Total: 6,785
  - Density: 3,130/km^{2} (8,100/sq mi)
- Demonym: Sangiorgesi
- Time zone: UTC+1 (CET)
  - Summer (DST): UTC+2 (CEST)
- Postal code: 20010
- Dialing code: 0331
- Patron saint: Saint George
- Saint day: April 23
- Website: Official website

San Giorgio su Legnano (Legnanese: San Giorgiu) is a comune (municipality) in the Metropolitan City of Milan in the Italian region Lombardy, located about 20 kilometres (12 mi) northwest of Milan.

San Giorgio su Legnano borders the following municipalities: Legnano, Villa Cortese, Canegrate, Busto Garolfo. It is located in the Po Valley northwest of Milan, from which it is 34 km away, near the valley in which the Olona river flows. Located slightly higher than the neighbouring Legnano (hence the preposition "su", en. "up", in the name), it is one of the smaller municipalities in the metropolitan city of Milan.

Since 1957, the town has hosted the annual Campaccio competition, a cross country running event which attracts world class athletes. On 10 December 2006, San Giorgio su Legnano hosted the 2006 European Cross Country Championships.

== Geography ==
=== Territory ===
The territory of San Giorgio su Legnano is located at the northern edge of the Po Valley, south of the Alpine foothills. It rises on a moorish plateau at the edge of the hollow dug by the Olona river. The soil consists mainly of pebbles, gravel, sand and clay. Originally the territory was covered with a thin layer of humus unsuitable for forest growth and agricultural cultivation, so as to be largely moorland.

The territory has an area of 2.3 square kilometer and is distributed on land that has an altitude of between 189 m and 201 m above sea level. According to the seismic hazard, the municipality is in zone 4 (irrelevant seismicity), as established by PCM ordinance 3274 of 20/03/2003.

=== The town ===
The urban fabric of San Giorgio su Legnano has developed around the old town. Then, gradually, between 1914 and 1958, San Giorgio was the subject of a marked urbanization that led to the occupation of most of the area of the municipality.

At the same time, there has been a significant increase in the number of new citizens entering the area, who have started to work in the fledgling industries in the area; as can be seen from demographic trends, between 1861 and 1961, the population of San Giorgio quadrupled.

Then, due to the various economic crises that followed in the decades of the 20th century, a new phase began that led to the closure of many companies with the consequent birth of many brownfield areas, many of which were recovered.

== Climate ==
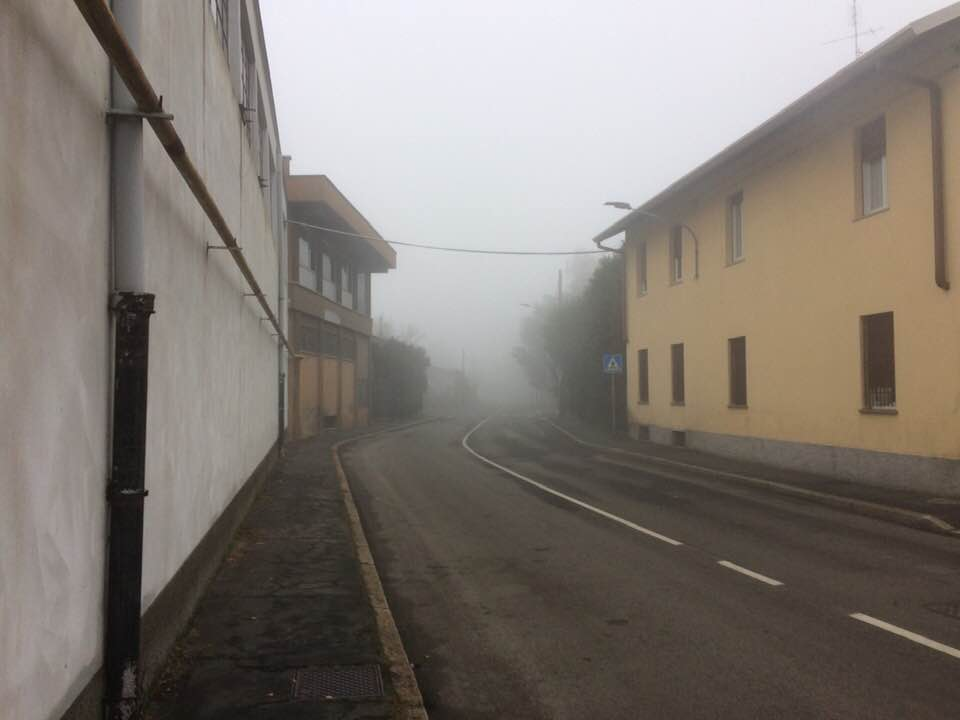
San Giorgio su Legnano during a foggy day

According to the climatic classification of Italian comunes, San Giorgio su Legnano is in Zone E with a rating of 2451 GR/G. Due to its location in the upper Po Valley, San Giorgio su Legnano has a Continental climate with cold winters characterized by many days of snowfall and fog. Summers are hot humid, and moderately wet; temperatures can exceed 30 °C (86 °F) and humidity 80%. That humidity persists for the entire year because of precipitation brought on by cyclones originating in the Mediterranean or in the Russian north. That precipitation itself remains in the Po Valley because of its poor ventilation.

Data from the Milan Malpensa meteorological station indicates that, based on the more than thirty years (1961–1990) of reference accumulated by the World Meteorological Organization, that the average temperature of the Milan area the coldest month, January, is −4 °C (25 °F) and that of the hottest month, July, is 28 °C (82 °F). Rainfall averages at 1,000-millimetre (39 in) and has peaks in spring and autumn, countered by a relative drop during the winter.

The basic climatic data of San Giorgio su Legnano are:

Climate data for Milano Malpensa
Month	Jan	Feb	Mar	Apr	May	Jun	Jul	Aug	Sep	Oct	Nov	Dec	Year
Record high °C (°F)	21.0 (69.8)	24.4 (75.9)	25.4 (77.7)	28.0 (82.4)	30.7 (87.3)	34.3 (93.7)	37.0 (98.6)	35.8 (96.4)	33.9 (93.0)	28.1 (82.6)	22.8 (73.0)	21.1 (70.0)	37.0 (98.6)
Mean daily maximum °C (°F)	6.1 (43.0)	8.6 (47.5)	13.1 (55.6)	17.0 (62.6)	21.3 (70.3)	25.5 (77.9)	28.6 (83.5)	27.6 (81.7)	24.0 (75.2)	18.2 (64.8)	11.2 (52.2)	6.9 (44.4)	17.3 (63.2)
Mean daily minimum °C (°F)	−4.4 (24.1)	−2.5 (27.5)	0.4 (32.7)	4.3 (39.7)	9.0 (48.2)	12.6 (54.7)	15.3 (59.5)	14.8 (58.6)	11.5 (52.7)	6.4 (43.5)	0.7 (33.3)	−3.6 (25.5)	5.4 (41.7)
Record low °C (°F)	−18.0 (−0.4)	−15.6 (3.9)	−12.2 (10.0)	−6.1 (21.0)	−5.2 (22.6)	0.6 (33.1)	4.7 (40.5)	4.7 (40.5)	0.5 (32.9)	−5.3 (22.5)	−13.6 (7.5)	−15.2 (4.6)	−18.0 (−0.4)
Average precipitation mm (inches)	67.5 (2.66)	77.1 (3.04)	99.7 (3.93)	106.3 (4.19)	132.0 (5.20)	93.3 (3.67)	66.8 (2.63)	97.5 (3.84)	73.2 (2.88)	107.4 (4.23)	106.3 (4.19)	54.6 (2.15)	1,081.7 (42.61)
Average precipitation days (≥ 1.0 mm)	6	6	8	9	10	9	6	8	6	7	8	6	89
Average relative humidity (%)	78	76	69	73	74	74	74	73	74	77	80	80	75

== Toponymy ==
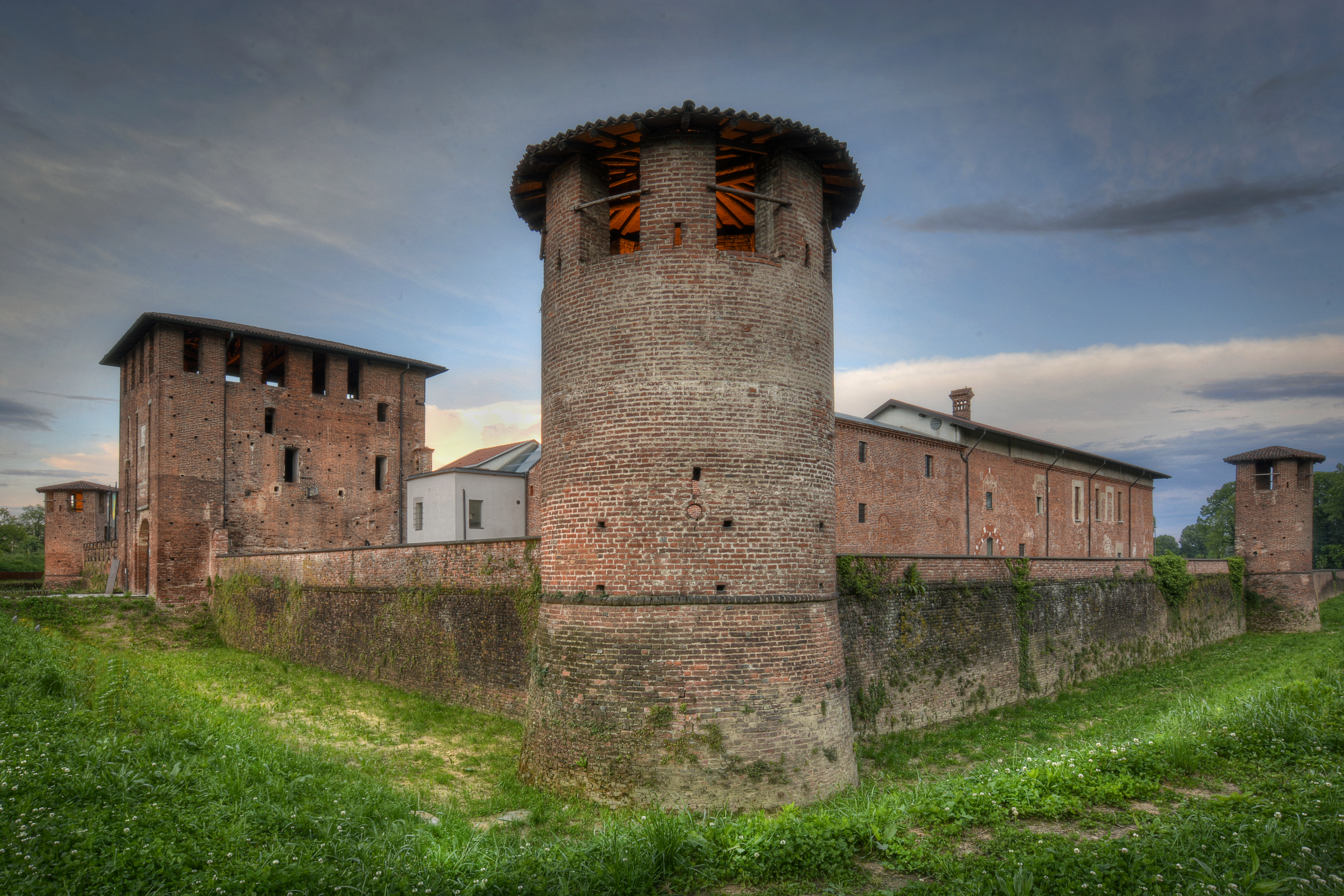
Castello Visconteo of Legnano, also known as "castello di San Giorgio"

The reference to the saint in the name of the municipality comes from a small church dedicated to Saint George attached to a convent of Augustinian friars present in the Legnano countryside, whose existence is attested by a manuscript of 1261. This monastery was the original nucleus of the Castle Visconteo of Legnano. It is likely that the presence of this monastery has then determined the title to Saint George, as well as the castle, also of a district of Legnano (the "Costa di San Giorgio") and the nearby municipality of San George su Legnano.

In the Middle Ages, the community of San Giorgiowas known as "Sotena" or "Sotera", as can be read in some parish archival notes that refer to a medieval repert. The first reference to Saint George in the name of the village appears on documents from the early 15th century, which indicate the community as locus Sancti Georgi Plebis Parabiaghi Duc. Mlni (it. "the location of Saint George, of the pieve of Parabiago, Duchy of Milan), while on maps of the Borromeo era (16th century) the town is mentioned as Cascina Sancti Georgi Plebis Parabiaghi Duc. Mlni ("Cassina di San Giorgio, of the pieve of Parabiago, Duchy of Milan"). San Giorgio was a member until 1535 of the municipality of Legnano, from which it was divided after the administrative reform of Charles V, Holy Roman Emperor.

After the Italian unification, following the enactment of the royal decree N°941, on 23 October 1862, the municipality took the name "San Giorgio su Legnano" to distinguish it from other municipalities of the same name.

== History ==
=== From Prehistory to Middle Age ===
In Prehistory the sangiorgese territory was covered by moorland. It was therefore an area where only bushes grew spontaneously, given the poor fertility of the soil. Over the centuries, thanks to the fertilization work of local farmers and the construction of artificial canals in the surrounding areas, the sangiorgese territory has been made arable. Once vast areas were cultivated and the flora of the wooded areas was composed mainly of oaks, hornbeams, chestnuts, common hazels, planes, ashes, poplars, elms, maples and alders.

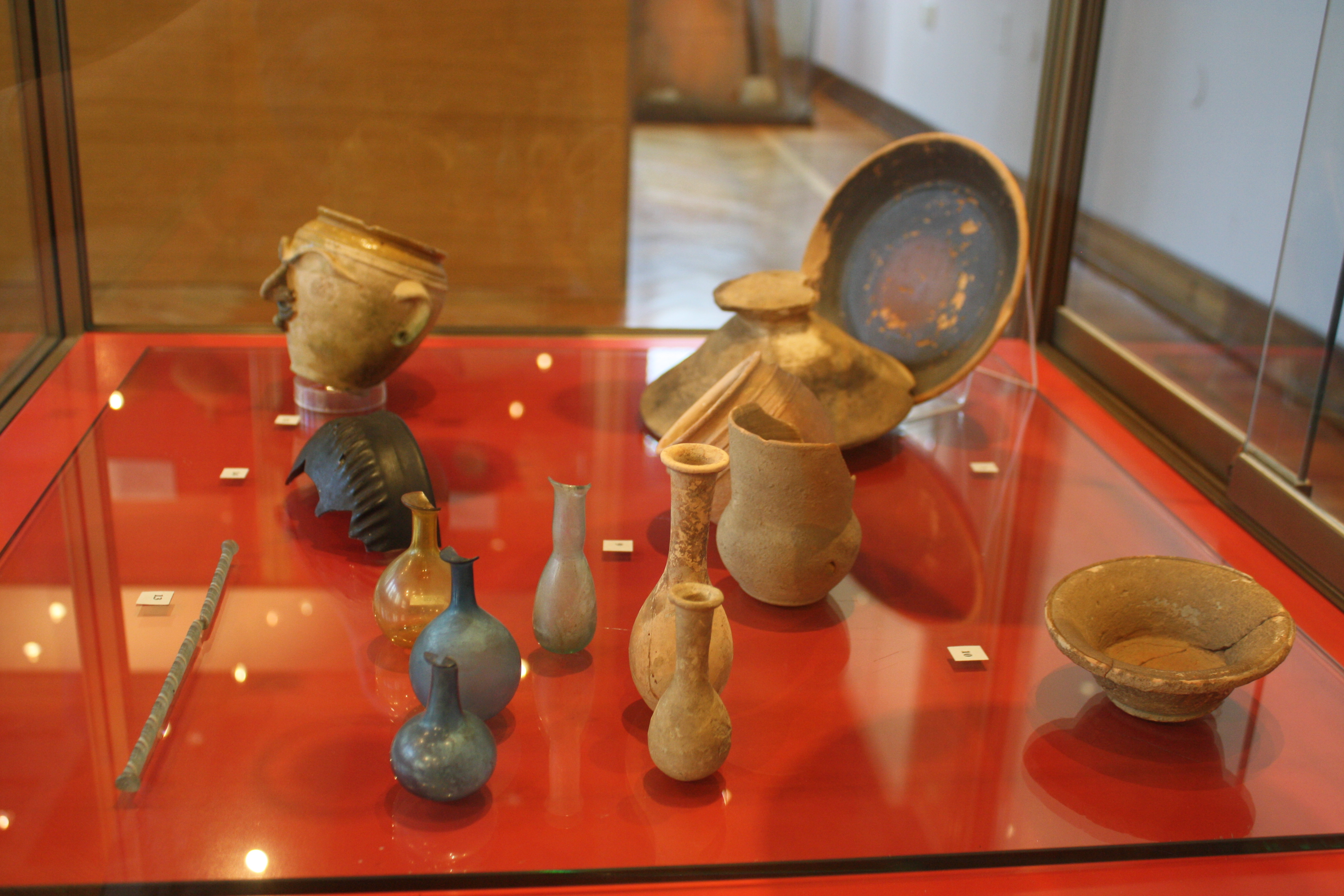
Roman-era finds (1st century BC – 1st century A.D.) found in San Giorgio su Legnano in 2004 in via Trento

The oldest archaeological records found in the territory of San Giorgio su Legnano are made up of Roman necropolises, the dating of which corresponds to the imperial age (1st century BC-4th century). The oldest tombs are strongly affected by Celtic influence, as the Romanization process is not yet complete.

The first documented naming the sangiorgese community is to an inscription carved on some bricks dated 1393 that were found during some excavations at the Church of Santissimo Crocifisso carried out in 1769, as evidenced by some notes in the San Giorgio su Legnano parish archive:

[...] Questa Chiesa essendo stata atterrata nel rifabbricarne una nuova nel 1769 si ritrovarono nei fondamenti due grandi mattoni sui quali il Conte Giorgio Giulini scrittore ha letto la seguente iscrizione: "[...] MCCCLXXXXIII (1393) Die XXVI maii Fond.e prima Hae Ecclesia Hedificata per Comunem Istum Sotene ad Honorem dei Santi Georgii Quam Segrata Fuit per Dominum Archiepiscopun [...]" […]

— Parish archive of San Giorgio su Legnano

In English this archive text means: "this Church, having been landed in the refabrication of a new one in 1769, found two large bricks on the foundations on which Count Giorgio Giulini writer read the following inscription: 1393 – 26 May – is the first church built in this Sotena Commune in Glory of God and Saint George and was consecrated by the Reverend Archbishop". Thus, originally, the sangiorgese community was called Sotena or Sotera and the aforementioned church, now no longer existing and later replaced by the Church of Santissimo Crocifisso, turns out to be the oldest temple of San Giorgio that has been traced. A widespread folk etymology of the word Sotera, which ran among the inhabitants of the area, would like this term to be a reference to the allusion to the Roman necropolis ("underground": in the legnanese dialect sota tèra).

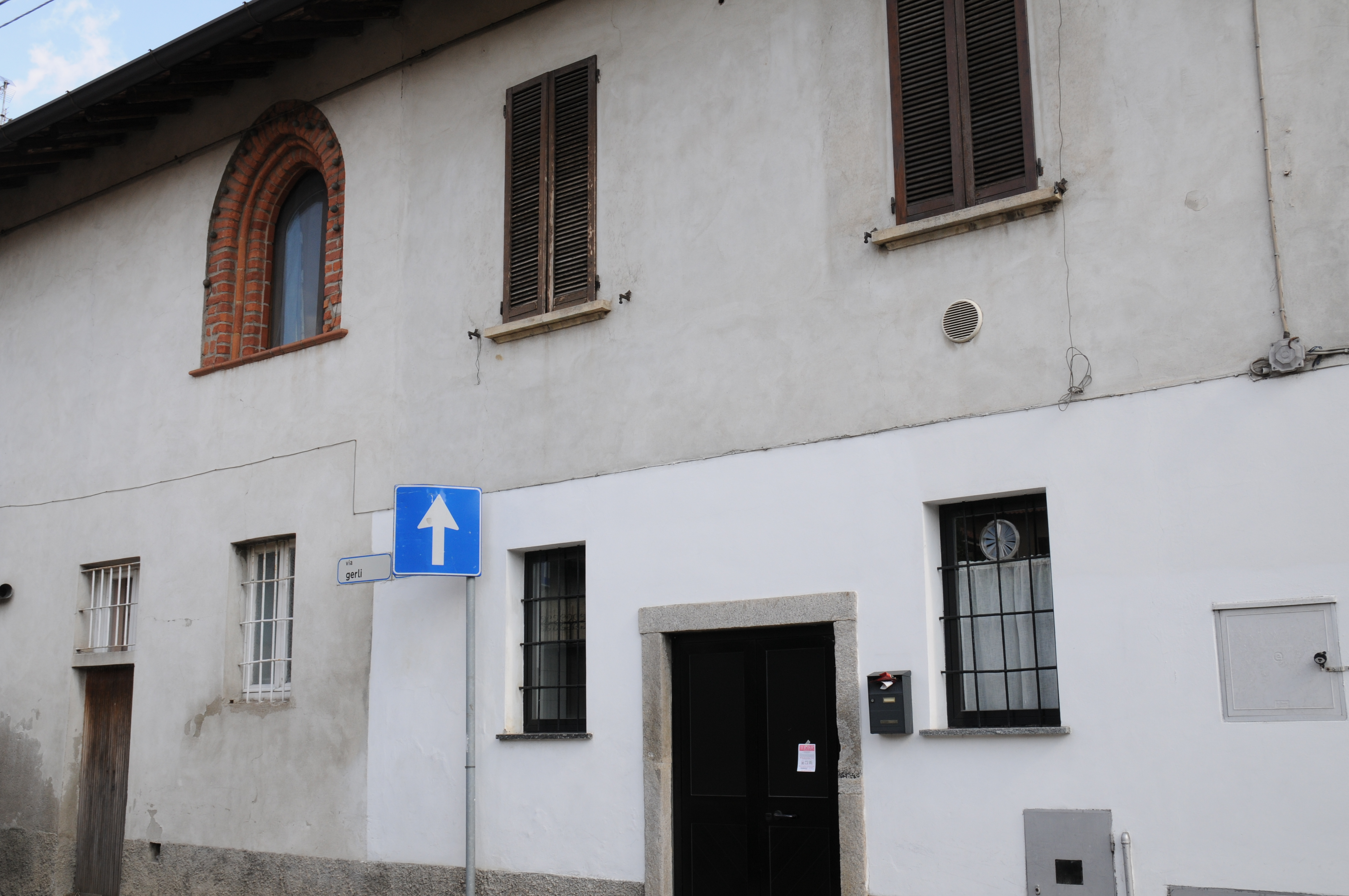
The "Casa della Regina" (en. "Queen's House"), the oldest building in the municipality

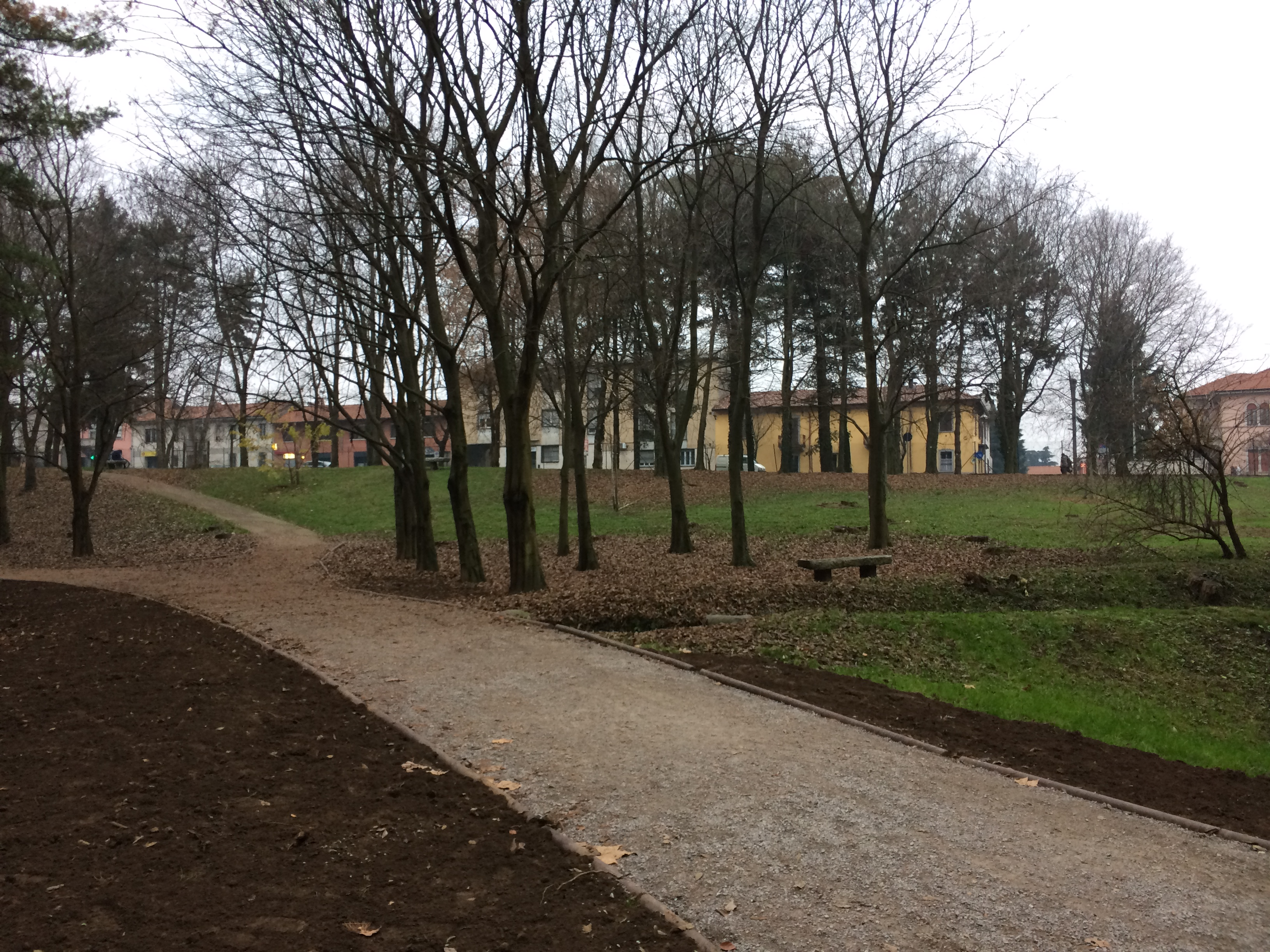
A view of the Parco castello in Legnano. In the background you can see the district of Costa San Giorgio belonging to comune of Legnano, while in the foreground is visible part of the escarpment that may have been the scene of the Battle of Legnano. The territory of the municipality of San Giorgio su Legnano is located beyond the district of Costa San Giorgio

Apart from this inscription, there is no written news of the sangiorgese community of the Middle Ages. In the register of churches of the Liber Notitiae Sanctorum Mediolani of Geoffrey da Bussero, which describes the religious context of the Milanese area between the end of the 13th century and the beginning of the 14th century, San Giorgio is not yet present. In this historical period, San Giorgio su Legnano was therefore a small group of houses that did not yet have its own church; the first religious building in the community to be traced is the church mentioned above, which was consecrated in 1393.

The only tangible evidence of the medieval San Giorgio is a sixth-door window, with a terracotta edge, present in a building overlooking the main square, the so-called Casa della regina (en. "Queen's House"), which is perhaps the oldest building in the country; on this dwelling, until the 1930s there was a coat of arms indicating the belonging of the building to the Visconti and that was taken away by an antique dealer: then the traces were lost.

The Battle of Legnano may have also been fought on the territory of San Giorgio su Legnano. One of the chronicles of the famous battle (29 May 1176), the Annales of Cologne, contains information indicating where the Carroccio was probably, and therefore where plausibly the battle would be fought: so that no warrior could withdraw, the Lombardi "aut vincere aut mori parati, grandi fossa suum exercitum circumdederunt", i.e. "ready to win or die in the field, placed their army inside a large pit". This would suggest that the Carroccio was placed on the edge of a steep slope, so that the imperial cavalry, whose arrival was expected along the course of the Olona river, would be forced to storm the center of the army of the Lombard League going up the hollowing. Considering the phases of the battle, this could mean that the famous battle may have also been fought on sangiorgese soil near the Costa San Giorgio, quartier belonging to municipality of Legnano, or on the territory of today's San Martino, another quartier belonging to municipality of Legnano, not being detectable, in other parts of the area, a hollow with these characteristics. Federico Barbarossa's army then came to the other side, from Borsano: this forced the municipal fanties to resist around the Carroccio, since they had the escape road barred by the Olona river, which they had behind them.

Popular legend has it that in those days a tunnel connected San Giorgio at the castle of Legnano, and that through this tunnel the emperor Federico Barbarossa managed to escape and save himself after the defeat in battle. In the 20th century, during some excavations, trunks of a very ancient tunnel were actually found. The first, not far from San Giorgio su Legnano, was explored by one of the workers who brought it back to light. The worker was dissuaded from exploration after walking five or six meters, due to a breath of wind that extinguished the candle. A second section towards Legnano was discovered and immediately obstructed by the municipal administration for safety reasons. In addition, during excavations carried out in 2014 at the castle of Legnano, the entrance to another secret gallery was identified.

In April 1273, Napoleone and Francesco della Torre welcomed king Edward I of England and Eleanor of Castile to Milan on their return from a trip to the Middle East. After taking leave of the Della Torre, the royals were taken to the castle of Legnano, where they stopped for one night. A popular legend, however, claims that the royals, on the way back, stayed overnight at San Giorgio su Legnano in the so-called "Queen's House". On the documents of the time, the event is described, citing the fact that the English royals had been housed "a Santo Georgio near Legnano".

=== From Middle Age to 18th century ===
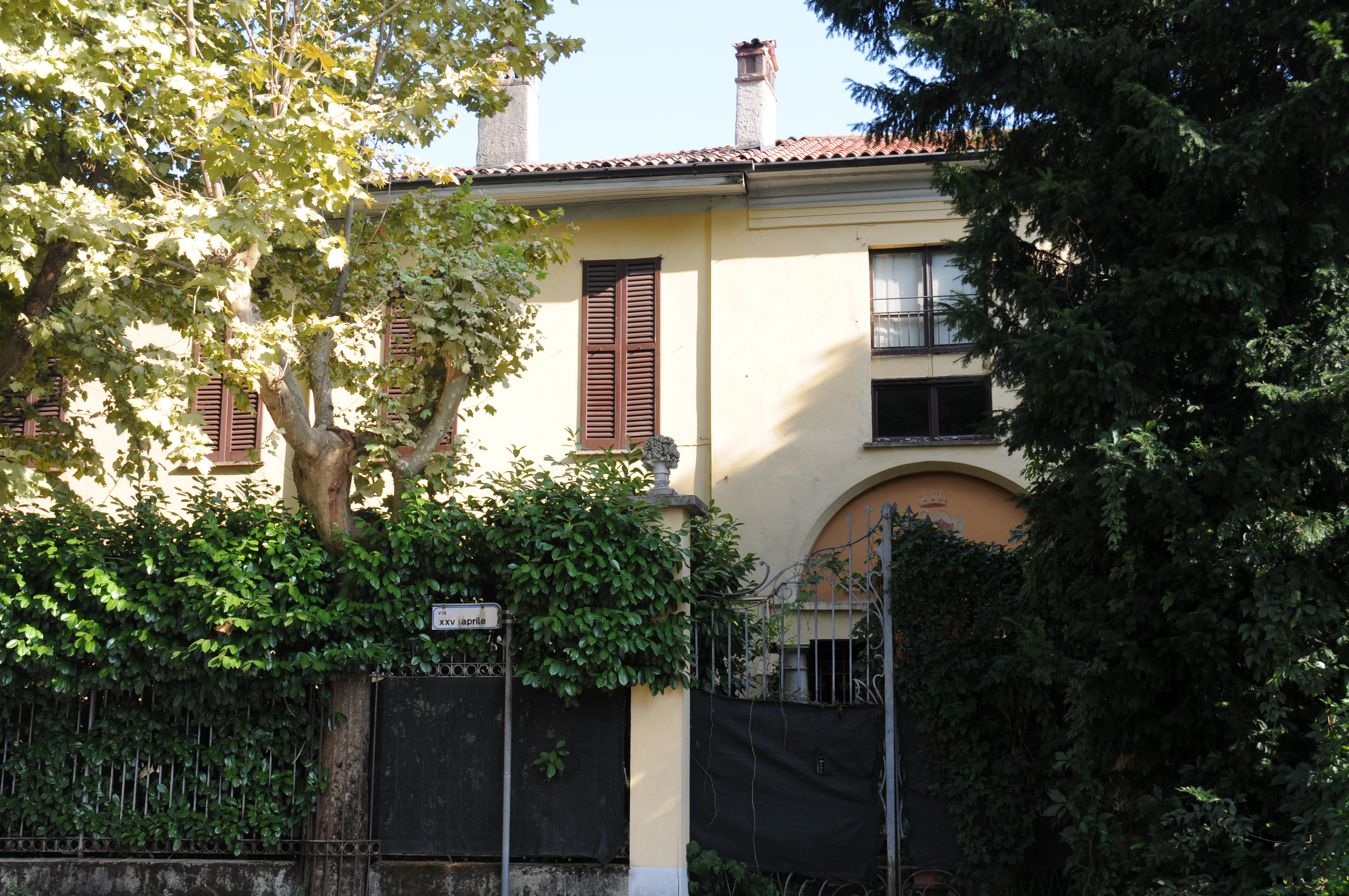
Villa Parravicini

In the Middle Ages the community of Sotena, like the nearby Legnano, was on the border between the Seprio peasants (whose capital was Castelseprio) and Burgaria (probably under the hegemony of Parabiago), two counties dependent on the Lombardy Brand, which was a territorial division from the Longobards and Franks.

At the time, the community depended on both the civil and religious aspects of the Pieve of Parabiago. Since the 16th century, San Giorgio had a mayor, even at the time a representative of the community. The mayor was flanked by a chancellor whose duties were similar to those of the municipal secretary in the contemporary Italian order. Among other tasks, the chancellor kept the municipal archive in his own home. In 1558, as shown by the Spanish register, the municipality consisted of eleven courtyards. At that time San Giorgio was therefore a small village.

One of the defining aspects of The history of San Giorgio in the 17th century was the infeudation. During this century the Spanish government auctioned off many land where the buyer, who had become a feudalist in this way, had the prerogative to boast political, economic and social rights to the fiefdom. Communities had the opportunity to redeem the land by paying a fee that was set based on the number of families in the community. San Giorgio secured the ransom in 1648 by taking on a debt of 3,000 lire with Francesco Castelli, a landowner. However, two years of poor harvests prevented the sangiorgese community from repaying the money. For this reason the sangiorgesi asked Camillo Castelli, son of Francesco, who had since died, to be unfaithful. The infeudation took place on 10 November 1656 for a sum of 3,430 lire. The sangiorgese community remained a fiefdom of the Castelli until 1780, when, with the death of Cardinal Giuseppe Castelli, the last descendant of the house, the debt was extinguished.

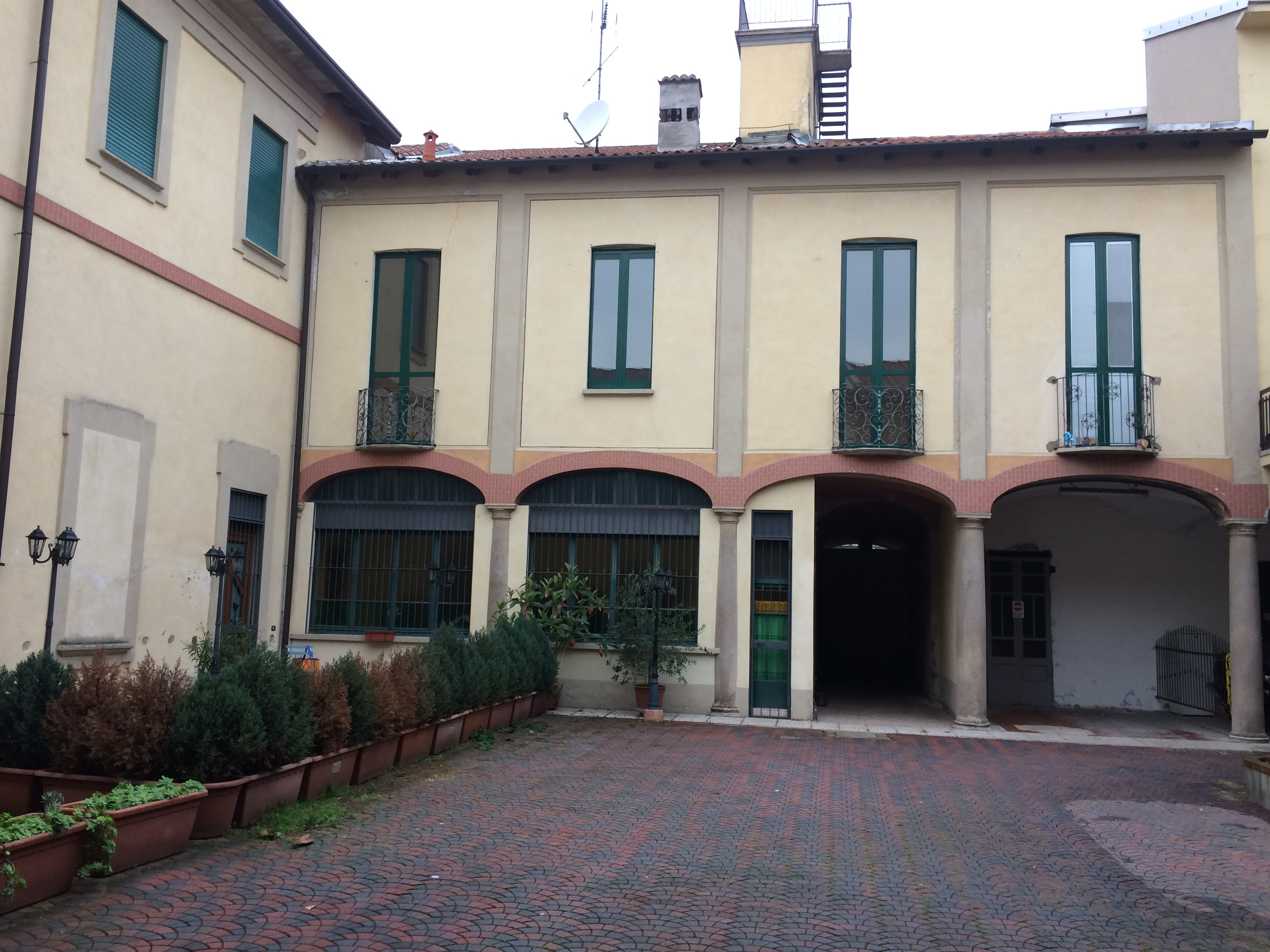
Palazzo Lucini Arborio Mella

In 1706 the Austrians took over from the Spanish as rulers of the Duchy of Milan. Among the initiatives promoted by the new government was the preparation of a register that was characterized by having much more detailed parameters than the previous ones. In addition to the precise measurement of all real estate, houses and land, a map was also made for each municipality of the Duchy. For the first time, the properties of the Catholic Church, which until then had been tax-exempt, were also recorded. Charles VI, Holy Roman Emperor, issued a decree establishing a working group, whose task was to accurately survey the municipalities belonging to his Lombard domains.

In the case of San Giorgio, the determination of the size of the territory began on 20 November 1721, thanks to a team of detectors and designers led by surveyor Benito Corradini. In addition to the size of the municipality, all the inhabitants were registered and cataloged all the real estate properties. It took eight days to complete the work. The product was a 1:2000 scale map showing the real estate (land and buildings), as well as the boundaries of the municipality. A copy of this map is still preserved at the town hall and also accurately shows the silhouettes of the buildings. The map shows the name given by the sangiorgesi to the various terrains, a denomination from the oral tradition. This map was complemented by a document, called "summary", where the various real estate properties were listed, with the measurement and destination of the land.

The inhabitants of San Giorgio su Legnano, as of 16 March 1730, were 777 and resided in 60 courtyards. There were 58 owners of real estate, but 11 of them owned as many as 92% of the municipality's land. According to this register, San Giorgio had an extension of 3,133 Milanese pertiche.

=== From 19th century to 21st century ===
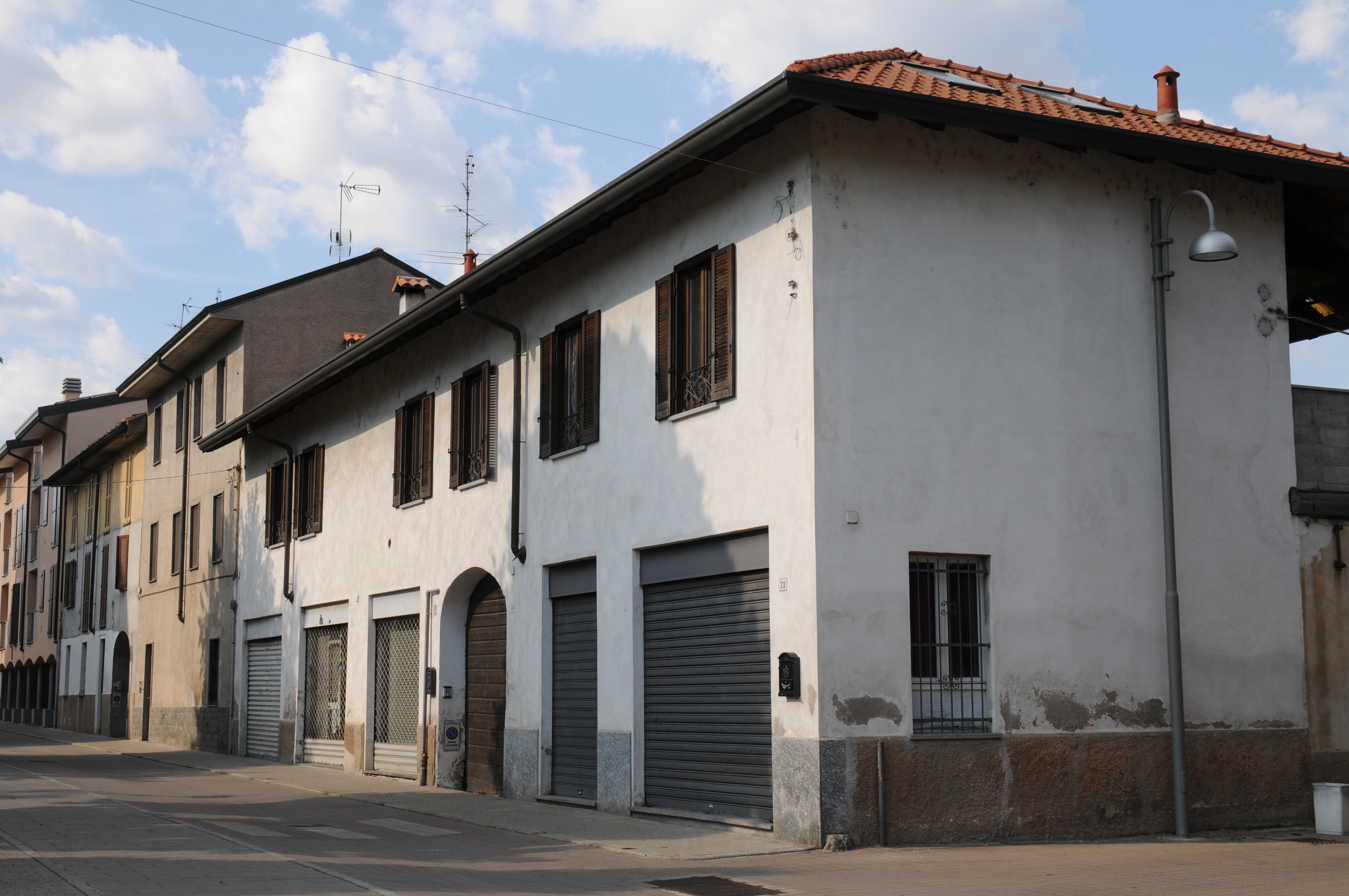
Historical center in San Giorgio su Legnano

In Napoleonic times, from an administrative point of view, the municipality of San Giorgio was suppressed and incorporated in the neighboring municipality of Canegrate. He was a member of the aforementioned municipality from 4 November 1809 to 8 November 1811.

Agricultural crops were very varied. The main crops were cereals (millet and wheat), vine and mulberry, which is the basis of the breeding of silkworms. In addition to the cereal crop, the economy of San Giorgio su Legnano was also based on livestock farming. The agricultural contract spread in these centuries in the Altomilanese was that of the sharecropper. Vine was the most common crop in the area. In 1723, in fact, about 70% of the sangiorgese territory was cultivated with vineyards. The vine was so common that, as recently as 1855, San Giorgio su Legnano was among the communities where the fraction of the land worked in vineyards was predominant.

On the social and economic front, this period was characterized by the profound transformation of the sangiorgese production system. It went from an agricultural economy to an industrial one. In the second half of the 19th century, the first small proto-industrial activities appeared. According to a document from 1872, two protoindustries for the treatment of silk were based in San Giorgio su Legnano, one for processing and the other for twisting. Overall, they employed about 200 people, mostly women. According to a written testimony of 1891, among the proto-industrial activities, a detached headquarters of the Kramer & C. plant in Legnano appeared and a craft activity for the production of spirits appeared.

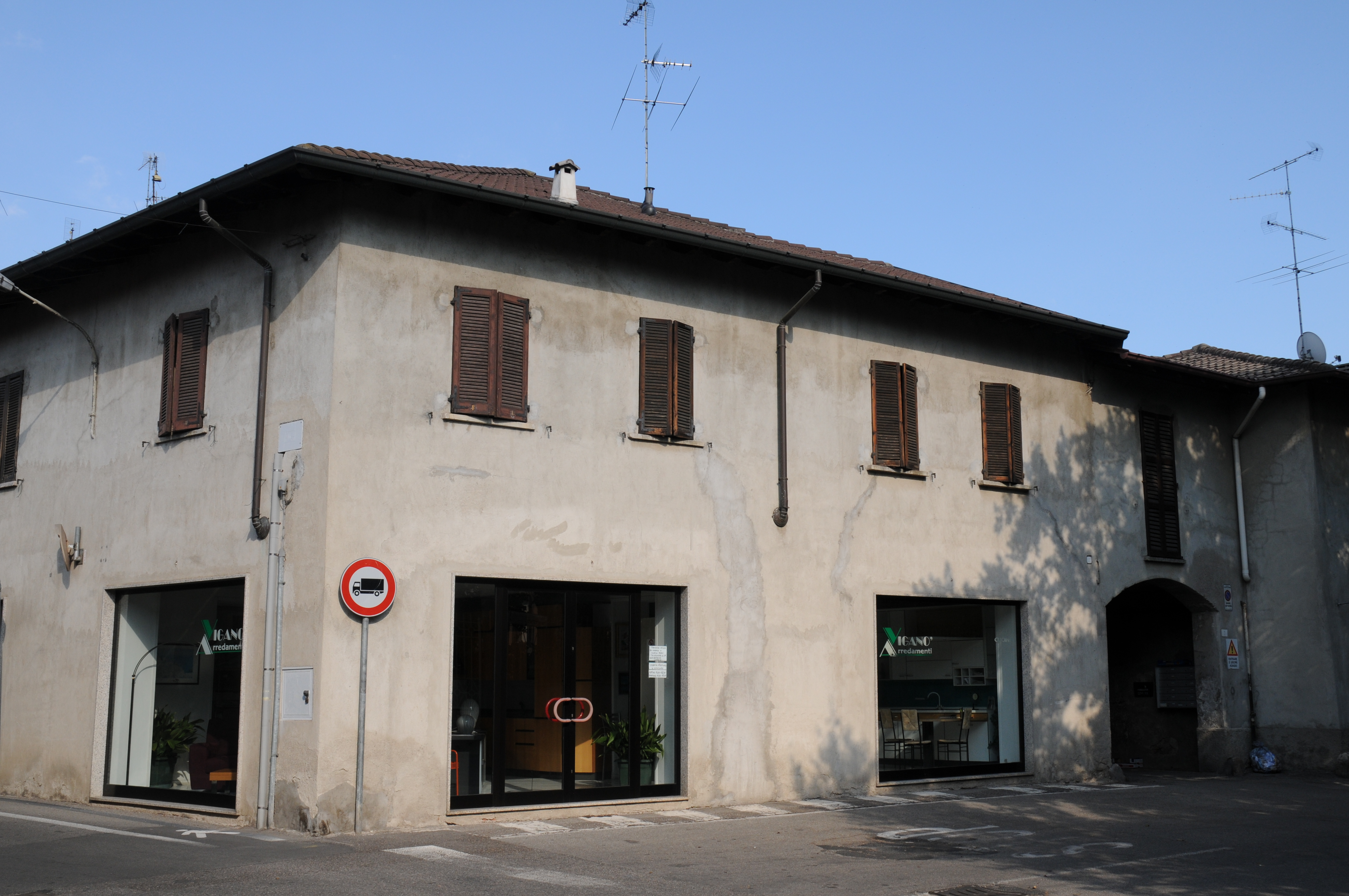
Historical center in San Giorgio su Legnano

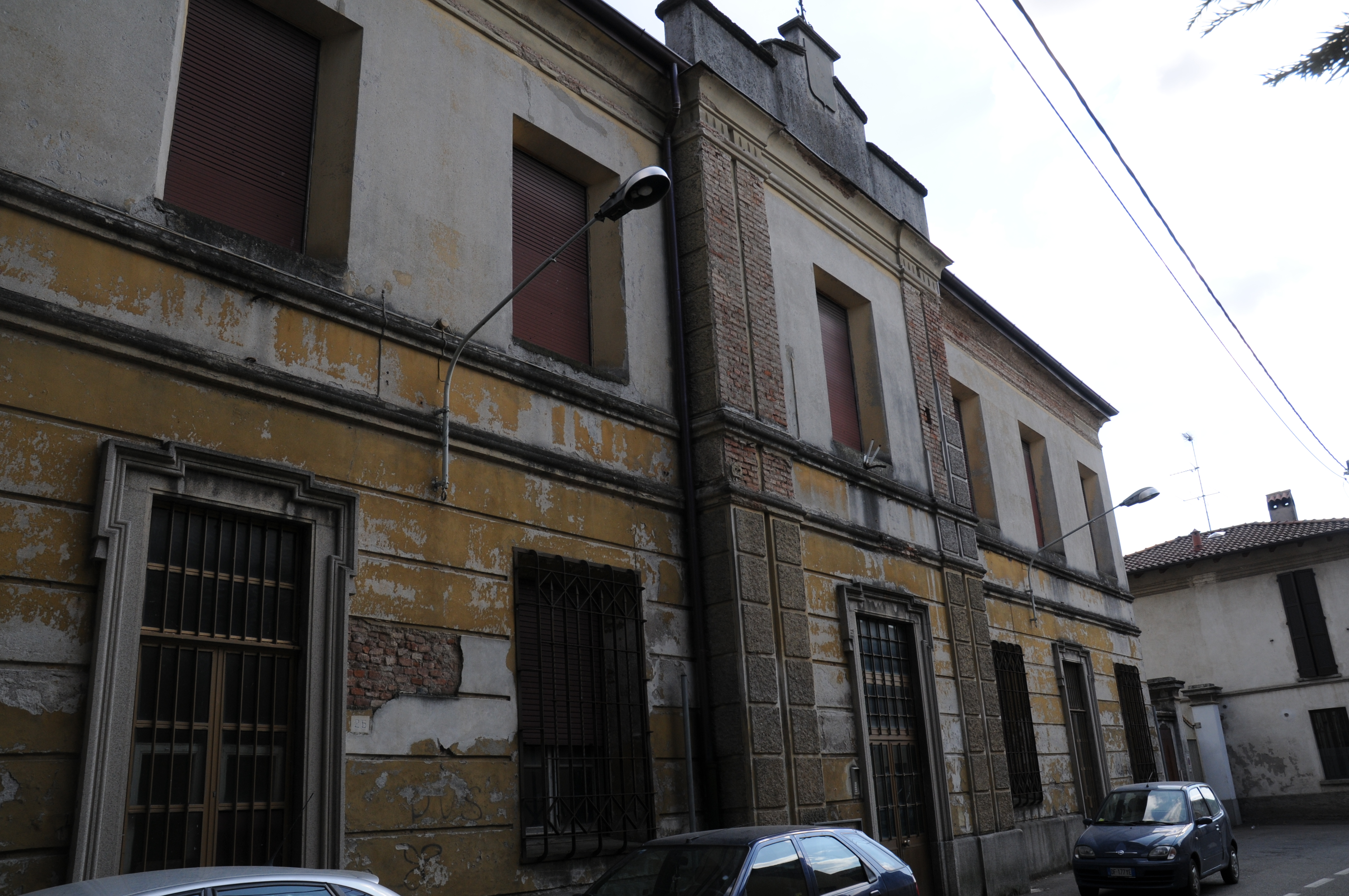
Former town hall in San Giorgio su Legnano

The process of industrialization that led to the gradual transformation of the sangiorgese economy was accelerated by two natural disasters that put local agriculture in crisis: cryptogamy, a disease that affected the vine, and nosematosis, an epidemic that damaged the cocoons of silkworms. For the first infection, which appeared between 1851 and 1852, the result in Lombardy was the rapid fall in the amount of wine produced. The hectolitres of wine produced rose from 1,520,000 in 1838 to 550,000 in 1852. The final blow to wine production came from two other diseases of the vine that, between 1879 and 1890, affected the plant: the peronospora and the phylloxera. Following these epidemics, the wineries in San Giorgio su Legnano disappeared for good and the peasants concentrated their efforts on the production of cereals and the breeding of silkworms. In other wine areas the problem was solved by grafting species of vines immune to the disease (American grapes).

However, this did not happen in San Giorgio: in 1911 about 80% of the agricultural land of San Giorgio su Legnano was destined for the cultivation of mulberries, with the cultivation of the vine having completely disappeared. Shortly after the spread of the disease of the vine, an infection of the silkworm, nosematosis, appeared. It was also called pébrin because it was revealed by small dark spots that covered the body of the bug. It was a disease that had never appeared before, and was considerably more dangerous than the kick that for centuries ruined part of the crop. The mulberry culture did not follow the fate of viticulture. The end of the cultivation of silkworms was in fact less rapid than that of viticulture. In San Giorgio, mulberries were cultivated until the early part of the 20th century.

In the second part of the 19th century, Europe was hit by an agricultural crisis involving cereal crops. This was due to the spread of American grains at competitive prices on the markets. In fact, large areas of the American Middle West were destined for cultivation. In addition, thanks to technological advancement, there was a marked decrease in the cost of transport by sea. The effect was a deep crisis that affected cereal crops in Europe. This juncture, which reached its peak in the 1880s, characterized the agriculture of the old continent until the beginning of the 20th century. At this point the economic structure of San Giorgio su Legnano changed completely into an industrial system.

In 1911, the Ministry of Agriculture, Industry and Commerce released data from the first statistical survey of industrial plants. Out of 3,015 sangiorgesi, almost 50% worked in the industrial sector. To make the idea more precise of the economic system would be enough to mention the animals present in 1937 in the stables of sangiorgesi, compared to almost 3,900 inhabitants: 17 oxen, 31 calves, 126 cows, 46 horses, 3 donkeys, 1 mule, 1 hinny, 12 pigs and 11 goats. To complete the picture around the agricultural economy of the sangiorgese community, in the early 1940s, the cultivated fields provided about 1,800 tons of wheat, 400 rye and 80 oats.

At the turn of the 1950s and 1960s there was the golden age of the sangiorgese industry, mainly related to the textile and mechanical industries. In the decades that followed, there was a slow decline caused by competition from textiles from developing countries. The crisis progressively worsened, damaging the economy, employment and industrial fabric, that resized. These processes continue to this day. Agriculture, marginal in its impact on the production system, is practiced in the few areas free of construction and infrastructure. These soils are grown from cereals, mainly wheat and maize. San Giorgio su Legnano, like the whole surrounding area, is still among the most developed and industrialized areas of Italy.

== Main sights ==
=== Religious architecture ===
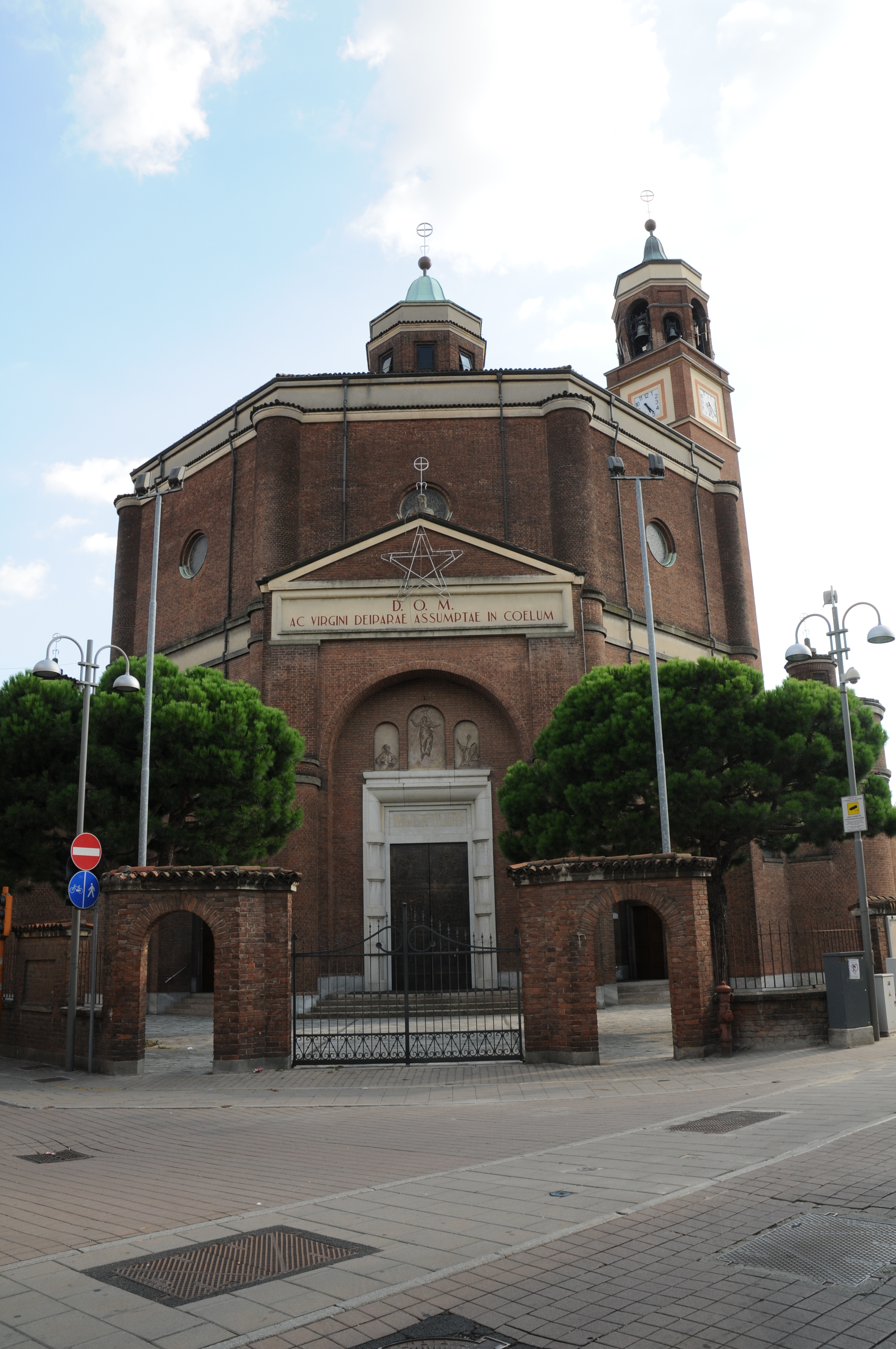
Church of Beata Vergine Assunta

In San Giorgio su Legnano there are two churches, a subsidiary and a parish one. Prior to the construction of the latter, the community referred to a church before 1750 and later demolished and also called by the same name as the modern parish.

The parish church of San Giorgio su Legnano, Church of Beata Vergine Assunta, that is dedicated to Assumption of Mary, was consecrated on 23 April 1935 by the Archbishop of Milan, Alfredo Ildefonso Schuster. The domed octagonal church is an example of a Bramantes-inspired Renaissance style, easily inferred from the central plant. On each of the eight sides open the corresponding side chapels and the presbytery, which develops in depth. The two side chapels, one of the Sacred Heart and the other of Our Lady are increased, forming a circle-shaped outline closed by a dome. Another peculiarity of the church is the use of bricks of clear Lombard derivation.

The subsidiary church, dedicated to Saint George, is known as the Church of Santissimo Crocifisso. It is located in the place where the oldest religious building in the community was located. After the construction of 1703, it was called a Chiesa Nuova (en. "New Church"). In 1933 it was called the Chiesa del Santissimo Crocifisso.

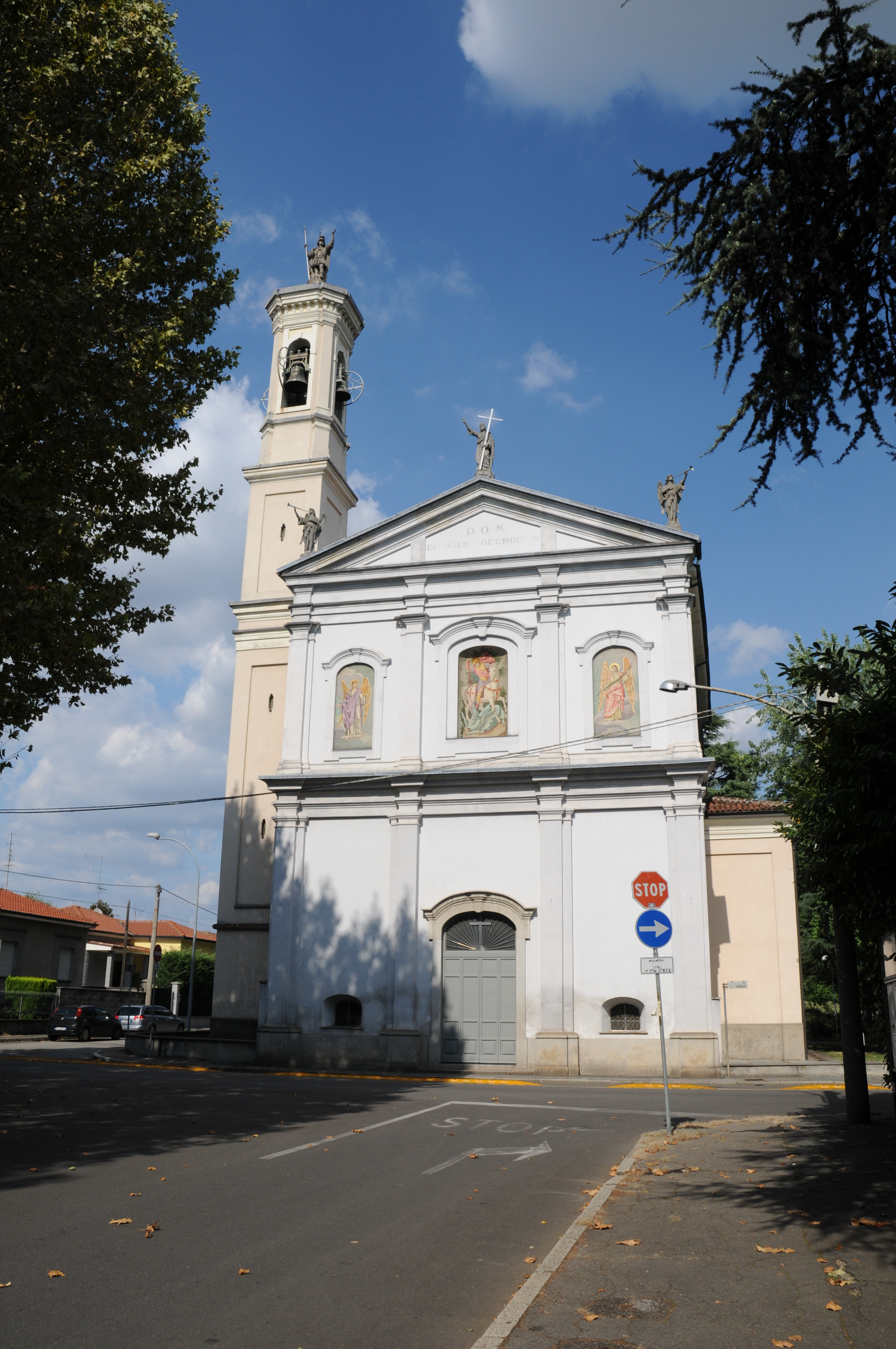
Church of Santissimo Crocifisso

The first documented reports on the old parish Church of Beata Vergine Assunta date back to 1750, the year of its expansion. The temple, in the Baroque style, had a single aisle that was complemented by side chapels. The apse was boasted of frescoes. The facade had a simple invoice, and was decorated with lesene. On the left of the facade was the bell tower, while on the right was the oratory of Saint Louis. The former parishioner finished his religious duties in October 1934. It was deconsecrated by archbishop's decree on 24 February 1936 and was sold by the parish on 9 January 1948. It was demolished in 1974.

Madonna di Baldeur chapel was built in the area where the dead of the plague of 1630 were buried. Inside was visible the image of Our Lady with the Child. Every year a procession was made from San Giorgio to the chapel in commemoration of the dead from the plague, and a party followed the ceremony. It was demolished in 1986 for the construction of a road.

=== Civil architecture ===
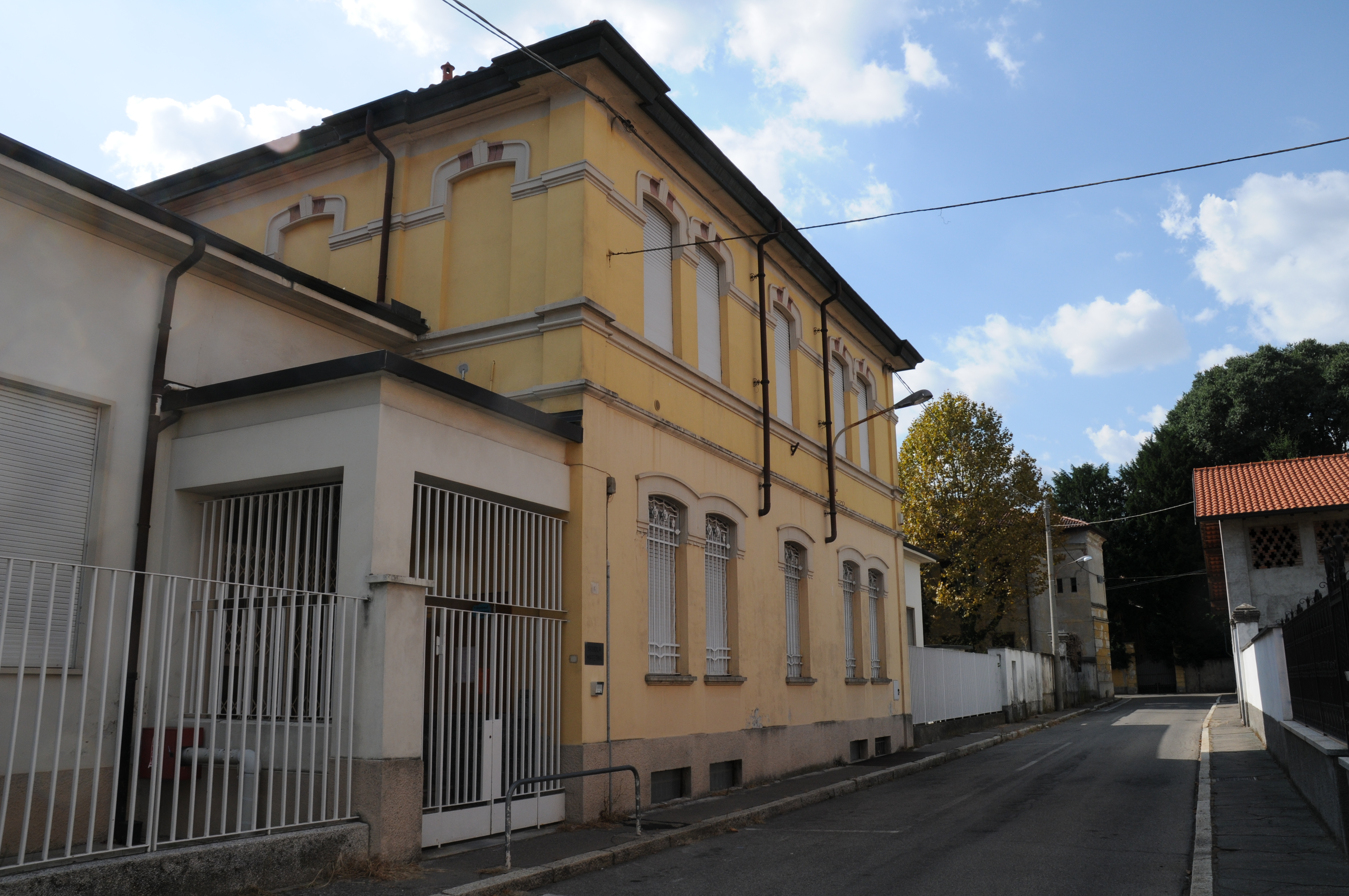
Kindergarten in San Giorgio su Legnano

In San Giorgio su Legnano there are some buildings of historical interest. The oldest, among those owned by the municipality, is the former town hall of San Giorgio su Legnano. Born as a home of elementary schools and municipal offices and situated in via Gerli, it was inaugurated in 1892. It also housed classrooms until 1929, when the new schools were inaugurated. He served as a town hall until 1992.

The building that houses the Circolo familiare was built in the early 20th century having a commercial function. Since 1936 he has been doing social activities. Another notable property is the kindergarten, which opened on 15 July 1909.

There are several works designed by the famous architect Of sangiorgese Gino Maggioni in his home country. More specifically, they are the Monumento ai caduti (en. "monument to the fallen": opened in 1921), the cemetery (1928) and elementary schools (1929). Since 1992, the school plexus designed by Gino Maggioni has been used as a municipal seat.

There are also three noble villas in the municipality, namely Villa Parravicini, Palazzo Lucini Arborio Mella and Villa Bizzozzero.

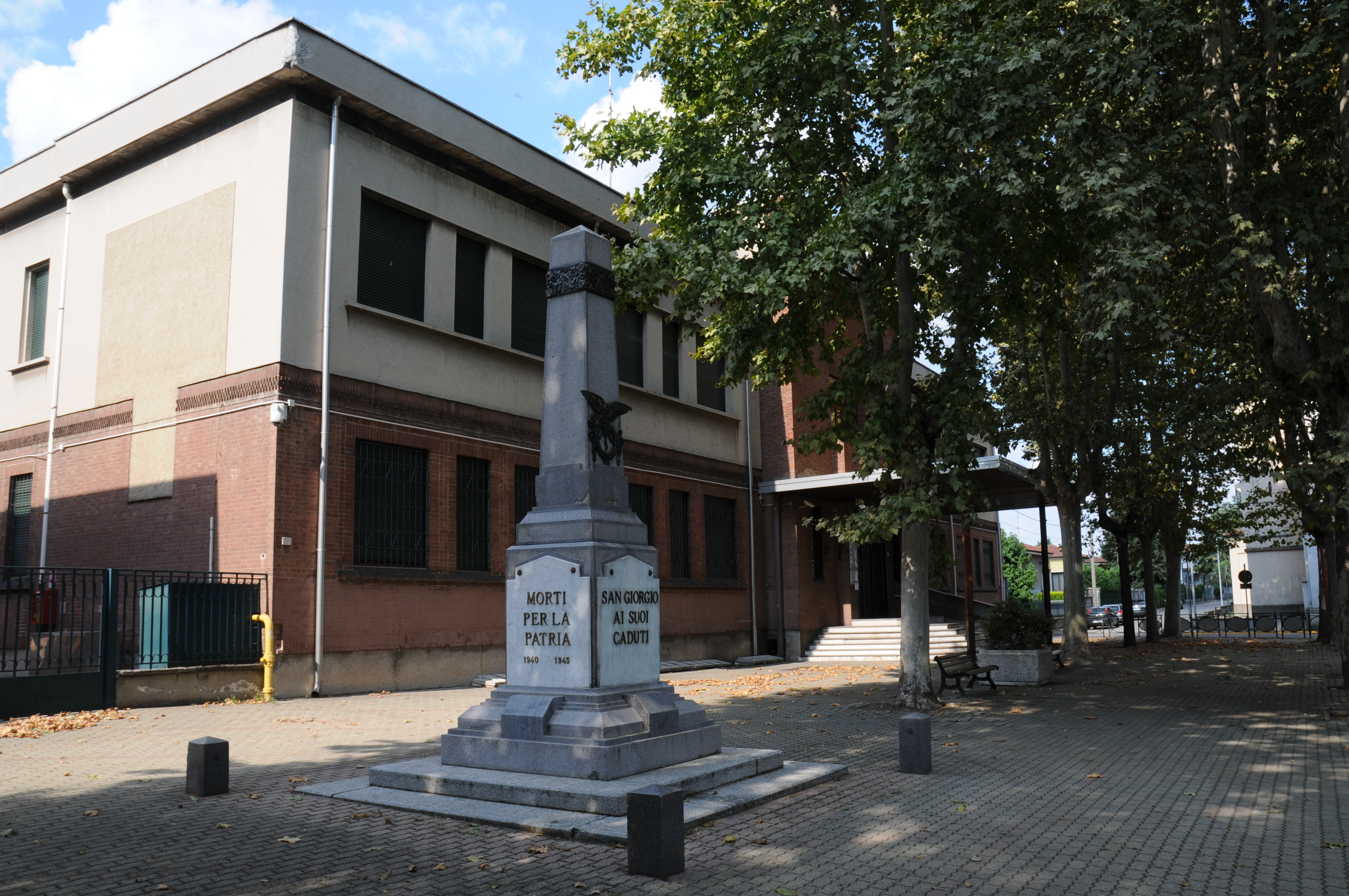
The monument to the fallen and the current town hall of San Giorgio su Legnano

The Villa Parravicini has undergone several changes over the centuries that have radically altered the appearance. This building already existed in 1584 and was home to a nobleman owned by Ludovico Crivelli. In a document dated 1655 we can read:

"[...] Casa da nobile posta nel detto luogo della Cassina di San Giorgio con diversi luoghi in terra e i doi colombari, portici, stalla, polaro, corte, pozzo comune [...] "

— Documenti dated 1655

In English this text means: "Noble house placed in the said place of the Cassina di San Giorgio with different places on earth and doves doi, porches, stable, polar, court, common well.

The villa has an English landscape garden, which covers about 9,300 square meters. Originally, the green area had a larger extent. Orio Vergani denounces the house, calling it:

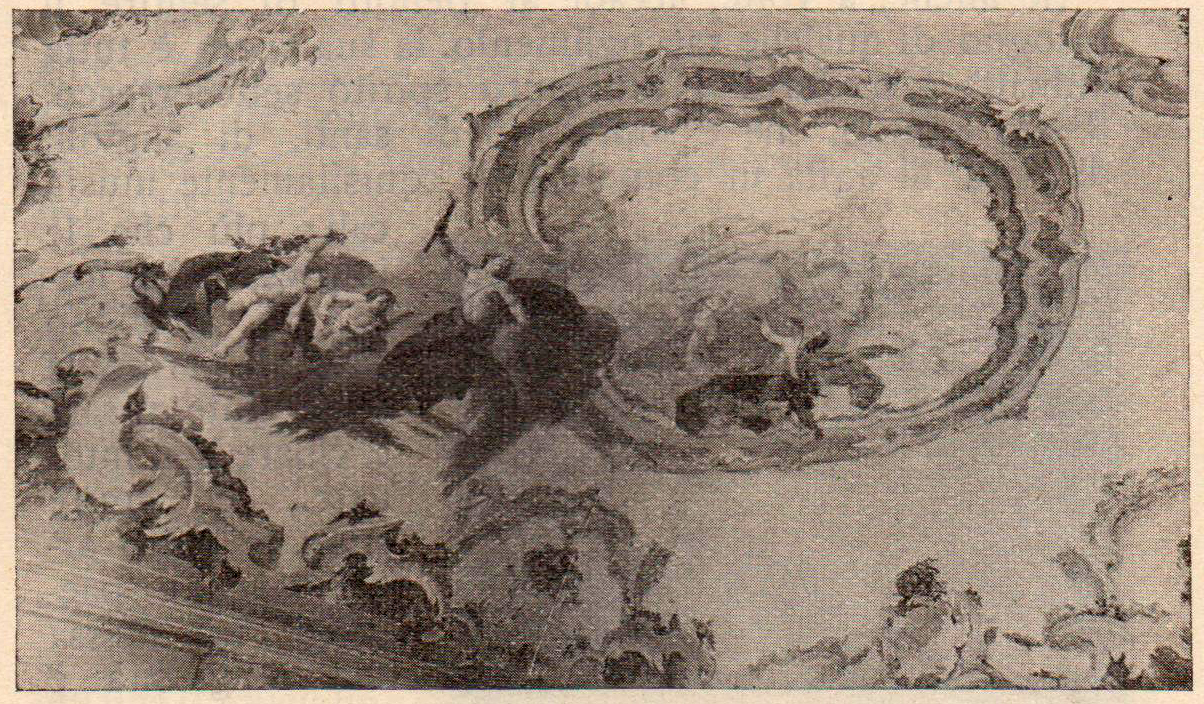
The frescoes of the hall of representation of Palazzo Lucini Arborio Mella, the work of Biagio Bellotti, in a vintage photo

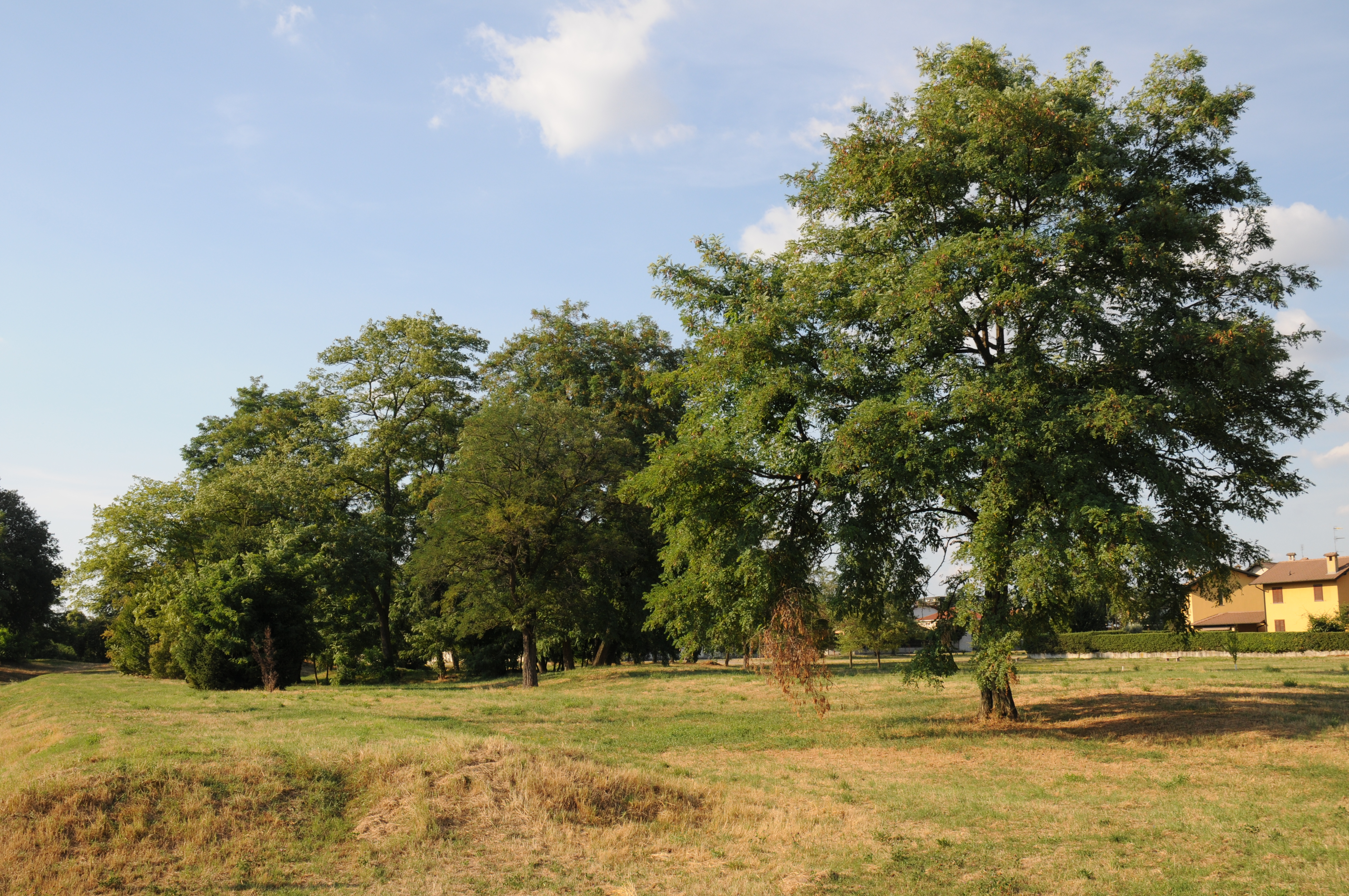
Park of Campaccio

"[...] Una villa che ha caratteristiche di semplicità e di austerità tipiche delle case padronali della zona [...] "

— Documenti dated 1655

In English this text means: "a villa that has characteristics of simplicity and austerity typical of the manor houses of the area".

The Palazzo Lucini Arborio Mella, whose date of construction is unknown, in the early 18th century belonged to Count Francesco Lucini, who was at that time the largest landowner of the municipality. The portal and a wrought-iron balcony on the low front of the old house are valuable. Later it passed to the accounts Arborio Mella and was renovated during the 18th century, as evidenced by the vault of the great salon frescoed in 1750 by Biagio Bellotti.

The Mella accounts decided to sell the building in 1922. The historic garden of the palace was created in the 19th century and sold to the parish for the construction of the new parish church. The building was divided into several properties. A portion of this building was the first seat of the town hall of the municipality of San Giorgio su Legnano (from 1924 to 1929). Today part of the building, owned by the municipality, houses a nursery.

In the centre of San Giorgio su Legnano you can still see also the Villa Bizzozzero, house owned by Carlo Bizzozero, one of the largest owners of rural and real estate of San Giorgio of the 18th century. This villa had a garden, overlooking piazza Mazzini.

=== Natural areas ===
Villa Parravicini has an English landscape garden, which covers about 9,300 square meters and includes more than 30 species of trees and more than 15 species of shrubs. Built in the mid-19th century, it is bound by the superintendence of environmental and architectural goods along with the manor house with their respective rustics as "natural beauty" (by ministerial decree of 25 June 1958). Originally it had a larger extension and also included an area now occupied by modern cottages.

The Parco Parravicini is throughout the Legnanese the only area that has the particular botanical features that have led to its protection. In the municipality there is another notable area, the park of Campaccio, where the eponymous cross-country race is run.

== Demographics ==
Historical population
Year	Pop.	±%
1861	1,349	—
1871	1,414	+4.8%
1881	1,520	+7.5%
1901	2,204	+45.0%
1911	2,933	+33.1%
1921	3,301	+12.5%
1931	3,720	+12.7%
1936	3,881	+4.3%
1951	4,711	+21.4%
1961	5,454	+15.8%
1971	6,044	+10.8%
1981	6,053	+0.1%
1991	6,234	+3.0%
2001	6,173	−1.0%
2011	6,730	+9.0%
Istat historical data 1861–2011

=== Ethnic groups ===
As of December 31, 2016, foreign nationals living in the municipality of San Giorgio su Legnano (ISTAT data) acombined 596. The most represented nationalities were:

1. Albania, 108
2. Morocco, 91
3. Ukraine, 51
4. Romania, 48
5. Pakistan, 42
6. Perù, 21
7. India, 20
8. Senegal, 20

=== Religion ===
The patron saint is Saint George. The majority of the population is Catholic Church. The immigration of EU and non-EU citizens has led to the establishment of large Orthodox, Muslims and Christian minorities. There is one Catholic parish in the municipality that belong to the Roman Catholic Archdiocese of Milan, the Parrocchia Beata Vergine Assunta.

== Transportation ==
San Giorgio su Legnano is lined by the provincial road N° 12, which is the most important road infrastructure present in the municipality. The intercity transport of San Giorgio su Legnano is carried out with scheduled services operated by Movibus.

== Economy ==
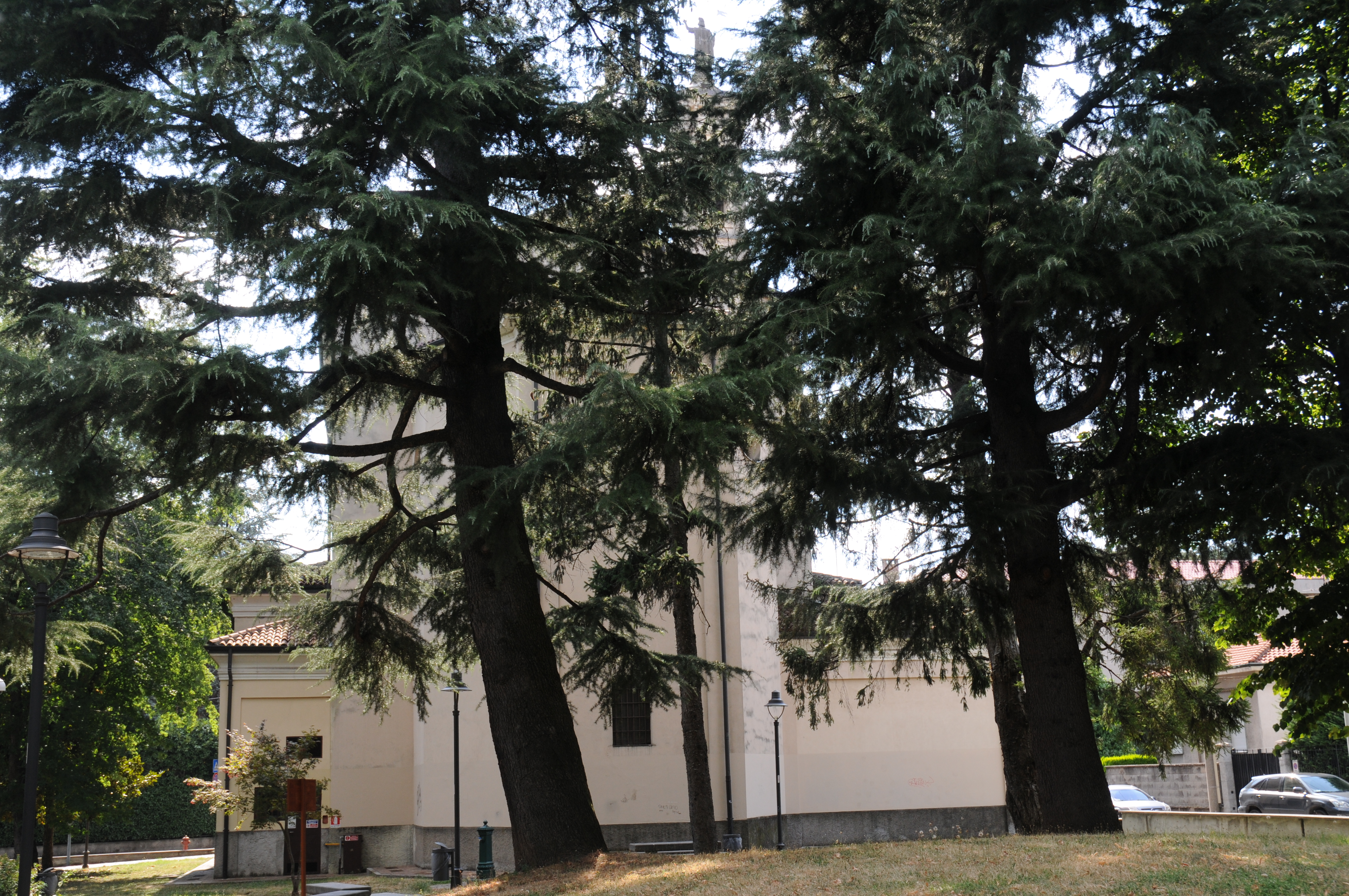
Church of Santissimo Crocifisso's gardens

Agriculture has been San Giorgio's main livelihood for centuries. With the advent of industrialization, in this role, it gave way to manufacturing activities. In the 21st century it is not an important activity for the economy of San Giorgio su Legnano; it is carried out in a limited part of the municipality, south of the town, which is still free from construction and infrastructure.

The first Sangiorgese industries arose in the second half of the 19th century. From the beginning of the 20th century, the municipality was involved in a process of industrialization. The companies operating in San Giorgio su Legnano in this historical context were mainly textiles and mechanics. The sangiorgese industries reached the height of development in the 1950s and 1960s, after which there was a period of constant involution. This crisis, which led to the partial deindustrialization of San Giorgio su Legnano, continued in the following decades compromising the industrial fabric, employment and, more generally, the economic system of the municipality. Many companies went bankrupt, mainly in the textile industry, and many others experienced downsizing. This partial deindustrialization of the sangiorgese territory continues into the 21st century.

== Culture ==
=== Languages and literature ===
Around Legnano it's spoken Legnanese dialect, dialect of the Lombard language (belonging to the western branch), spoken by about 30% of the population of the area where it is spread. Like all Western Lombard dialects, legnanese is a Romance language derived from Latin with a Celtic substrate and longobard superstratum. In Legnanese dialect there are those who find traces of the languages of the peoples prior to the Latinization of the region, in particular the ancient Ligurian, although the data on the actual influence of this linguistic substrate are few and of varying interpretation. The linguistic influence of the Celts on the local speakers of Altomilanese was conspicuous, so much so that even today the dialect of Legnano is classified as "Gallo-Italic". However, it was the Roman domination, which supplanted the Celtic one, that shaped the local idiom spoken in Legnanese, so much so that the lexicon and grammar of this dialect is of Romance derivation.

=== Sport ===
The Unione Sportiva Sangiorgese s a multi-sports company founded in 1922 that deals with athletics, volleyball, basketball, skiing and hiking. The basketball team played in the Serie B championship.

The company organizes the cross-country race called Campaccio, an international event born in 1957 that takes place on a course of about 12 km. The name of the race comes from campasc, which in the Legnanese dialect means "uncultivated field". In fact, in the first editions, the route of the race winded through the nearby roads of the agricultural area of the municipality: later it was moved to a public park, the Parco del Campaccio.

The Campaccio is attended by internationally renowned athletes, including Olympic and world champions: it is therefore one of the most important events of its kind in Italy and is included in the international Cross Country Permit circuit of the European Athletic Association.

San Giorgio su Legnano hosted the 2006 European Cross Country Championships, organized by the Unione Sportiva Sangiorgese on 10 December. The men's title was won by Mohamed Farah and the women's title by Tetyana Holovchenko. In this edition of the championship, the races for athletes under 23 were introduced for the first time.

== Education ==
In San Giorgio su Legnano there are four public school plexuses: a first grade secondary school, a primary school and a kindergarten.
