= Mariem Alaoui Selsouli =

Moroccan runner (born 1984)

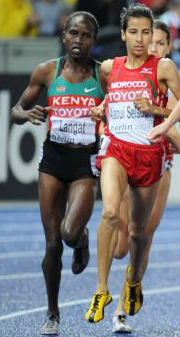
- Selsouli (right) at the 1500 m in Berlin in 2009, with Nancy Jebet Langat

Personal information
- Born: 8 July 1984 (age 42) Marrakesh, Morocco

Sport
- Country: Morocco
- Sport: Athletics
- Event: Middle distance running
- Updated on 19 August 2024

Mariem Alaoui Selsouli (Arabic: مريم علوي سلسولي; born 8 July 1984) is a Moroccan middle- and long-distance runner.

At the 2009 World Athletics Final in Berlin, Selsouli withdrew from the 1500m final after failing a drug test for EPO. She was suspended for two years by the IAAF, from 22 August 2009 to 21 August 2011. On 23 July 2012 she was banned from the Summer Olympics in London after testing positive for the diuretic furosemide, following her competition in Diamond league on 6 July 2012 in Paris-Saint-Denis. She had an 8-year doping ban from 6 July 2012 to 24 July 2020.

== Achievements ==
Year	Competition	Venue	Position	Event	Notes
Representing Morocco
2001	World Youth Championships	Debrecen, Hungary	5th	3000 m	9:26.27
2002	World Junior Championships	Kingston, Jamaica	5th	1500 m	4:16.08
2002	World Junior Championships	Kingston, Jamaica	2nd	3000 m	9:16.28
2005	Universiade	İzmir, Turkey	10th	1500 m	4:18.81
2005	Universiade	İzmir, Turkey	5th	5000 m	16:07.99
2006	World Indoor Championships	Moscow, Russia	6th	3000 m	8:55.97
2006	World Cross Country Championships	Fukuoka, Japan	15th	Short race (4 km)	13:14
2006	World Cross Country Championships	Fukuoka, Japan	4th	Team	73 pts
2006	World Athletics Final	Stuttgart, Germany	12th	3000 m	9:06.40
2007	World Cross Country Championships	Mombasa, Kenya	17th	Senior race (8 km)	28:53
2007	World Cross Country Championships	Mombasa, Kenya	3rd	Team	99 pts
2007	World Championships	Osaka, Japan	4th	1500 m	4:01.52 PB
2008	World Indoor Championships	Valencia, Spain	3rd	3000 m	8:41.66
2012	World Indoor Championships	Istanbul, Turkey	2nd	1500 m	4:07.78

=== Personal bests ===
- 1500 metres – 4:00.77 min (2011)
- 3000 metres – 8:29.52 min (2007)
- 5000 metres – 14:36.52 min (2007)
