= 2012 European Athletics Championships – Women's 1500 metres =

Women's 1500 metres at the European Athletics Championships

The women's 1500 metres at the 2012 European Athletics Championships were held at the Helsinki Olympic Stadium on 30 June and 1 July.

== The dirtiest race in history ==
In this race, the first four classified were disqualified for doping, meaning the medals went to the athletes who reached the finish line in 5th to 7th place.

On 25 February 2016, the IAAF announced that Mischenko, the silver medal winner, had been found to have irregularities in her biological passport. She was banned from competition for two years until 17 August 2017, and all her results since June 28, 2012 were deleted from the records, including the silver medal won in this event.

After the disqualifications, Nuria Fernández of Spain was declared the winner of the event.

== Medalists ==
Gold	Nuria Fernández; Spain
Silver	Diana Sujew; Germany
Bronze	Tereza Čapková; Czech Republic

== Records ==
Standing records prior to the 2012 European Athletics Championships
World record	Qu Yunxia (CHN)	3:50.46	Beijing, China	11 September 1993
European record	Tatyana Kazankina (URS)	3:52.47	Zürich, Switzerland	13 August 1980
Championship record	Tatyana Tomashova (RUS)	3:56.91	Gothenburg, Sweden	13 August 2006
World Leading	Abeba Aregawi (ETH)	3:56.54	Rome, Italy	31 May 2012
European Leading	Svetlana Podosyonova (RUS)	3:59.61	Moscow, Russia	13 June 2012

== Schedule ==
Date	Time	Round
30 June 2012	12:10	Round 1
1 July 2012	16:10	Final

== Results ==
=== Round 1 ===
First 4 in each heat (Q) and 4 best performers (q) advance to the Final.

Rank	Heat	Name	Nationality	Time	Note
DQ	1	Anna Mishchenko	Ukraine	~~4:08.95~~	Q, Doping
DQ	1	Aslı Çakır Alptekin	Turkey	~~4:09.44~~	Q, Doping
DQ	1	Kristina Khaleyeva	Russia	~~4:09.69~~	Q, Doping
2	1	Isabel Macías	Spain	4:10.06	Q
3	1	Tereza Čapková	Czech Republic	4:10.22	q
4	1	Diana Sujew	Germany	4:10.72	q
DQ	2	Ekaterina Gorbunova	Russia	~~4:11.58~~	Q, Doping
5	2	Corinna Harrer	Germany	4:11.59	Q
DQ	2	Gamze Bulut	Turkey	~~4:11.68~~	Q, Doping
6	2	Nuria Fernández	Spain	4:11.77	Q
7	2	Ingvill Måkestad Bovim	Norway	4:11.97	q
8	1	Marina Munćan	Serbia	4:12.33	q
9	2	Luiza Gega	Albania	4:12.54	
10	1	Hind Dehiba	France	4:12.79	SB
11	1	Denise Krebs	Germany	4:12.85	
12	1	Ioana Doaga	Romania	4:13.73	
13	1	Angelika Cichocka	Poland	4:14.59	
14	2	Johanna Lehtinen	Finland	4:14.83	SB
15	2	Iris Fuentes-Pila	Spain	4:15.95	
16	2	Sonja Roman	Slovenia	4:16.68	
DQ	2	Anzhela Shevchenko	Ukraine	~~4:17.41~~	Doping
17	1	Ciara Mageean	Ireland	4:19.23	
18	2	Tuğba Karakaya	Turkey	4:19.58	SB
19	2	Orla Drumm	Ireland	4:19.61	
20	2	Lidia Chojecka	Poland	4:20.66	
	1	Charlene Thomas	Great Britain	DQ	

=== Final ===
Rank	Name	Nationality	Time	Note
DQ	Aslı Çakır Alptekin	Turkey	~~4:05.31~~	Doping
DQ	Gamze Bulut	Turkey	~~4:06.04~~	Doping
DQ	Anna Mishchenko	Ukraine	~~4:07.74~~	Doping
DQ	Ekaterina Gorbunova	Russia	~~4:08.63~~	Doping
1st place, gold medalist(s)	Nuria Fernández	Spain	4:08.80	SB
2nd place, silver medalist(s)	Diana Sujew	Germany	4:09.28	
3rd place, bronze medalist(s)	Tereza Čapková	Czech Republic	4:10.17	
DQ	Kristina Khaleyeva	Russia	~~4:10.26~~	Doping
4	Corinna Harrer	Germany	4:10.38	
5	Isabel Macías	Spain	4:11.12	
6	Ingvill Måkestad Bovim	Norway	4:13.32	
7	Marina Munćan	Serbia	4:15.63	
