= 2008 World Junior Championships in Athletics – Women's 1500 metres =

The women's 1500 metres event at the 2008 World Junior Championships in Athletics was held in Bydgoszcz, Poland, at Zawisza Stadium on 11 and 13 July.

== Medalists ==
Gold	Stephanie Twell; United Kingdom
Silver	Kalkidan Gezahegne; Ethiopia
Bronze	Emma Pallant; United Kingdom

== Results ==
=== Final ===
13 July

Rank	Name	Nationality	Time	Notes
1st place, gold medalist(s)	Stephanie Twell	United Kingdom	4:15.09	
2nd place, silver medalist(s)	Kalkidan Gezahegne	Ethiopia	4:16.58	
3rd place, bronze medalist(s)	Emma Pallant	United Kingdom	4:17.06	
4	Jordan Hasay	United States	4:19.02	
5	Bridey Delaney	Australia	4:21.20	
6	Alexandra Kosinski	United States	4:21.26	
7	Jana Sussmann	Germany	4:21.82	
8	Yekaterina Gorbunova	Russia	4:22.41	
9	Asmerawork Bekele	Ethiopia	4:24.70	
10	Ciara Mageean	Ireland	4:26.87	
11	Ioana Doaga	Romania	4:28.21	
12	Stacy Chepkemboi Ndiwa	Kenya	4:40.58	

=== Heats ===
11 July

==== Heat 1 ====
Rank	Name	Nationality	Time	Notes
1	Alexandra Kosinski	United States	4:19.14	Q
2	Stephanie Twell	United Kingdom	4:19.18	Q
3	Bridey Delaney	Australia	4:20.82	Q
4	Ciara Mageean	Ireland	4:21.73	q
5	Diana Sujew	Germany	4:21.82	
6	Sheila Chepkirui	Kenya	4:24.21	
7	Jessica O'Connell	Canada	4:24.73	
8	Hannah Barker	New Zealand	4:30.12	
9	Evangelina Thomas	Argentina	4:33.11	
10	Nathalie Rohlén	Sweden	4:33.82	
11	Antonija Zalac	Croatia	4:33.91	
12	Yuliya Kutah	Ukraine	4:38.96	
	Amina Bakhit	Sudan	DNF	

==== Heat 2 ====
Rank	Name	Nationality	Time	Notes
1	Kalkidan Gezahegne	Ethiopia	4:19.60	Q
2	Emma Pallant	United Kingdom	4:21.67	Q
3	Jana Sussmann	Germany	4:22.40	Q
4	Viktoriya Poliudina	Kyrgyzstan	4:26.03	
5	Olesea Smovjenco	Moldova	4:26.55	
6	Claire Andreani	France	4:27.00	
7	Daniela Cuñha	Portugal	4:31.20	
8	Katarzyna Broniatowska	Poland	4:31.28	
9	Lyudmyla Kovalenko	Ukraine	4:38.18	
10	Ntebaleng Letsela	Lesotho	4:54.90	
11	Anate Bampouni	Togo	5:07.35	

==== Heat 3 ====
Rank	Name	Nationality	Time	Notes
1	Asmerawork Bekele	Ethiopia	4:17.05	Q
2	Ioana Doaga	Romania	4:18.28	Q
3	Yekaterina Gorbunova	Russia	4:18.55	Q
4	Stacy Chepkemboi Ndiwa	Kenya	4:20.68	q
5	Jordan Hasay	United States	4:20.82	q
6	Kendra Schaff	Canada	4:22.29	
7	Bogdana Mimic	Serbia	4:24.91	
8	Sara Treacy	Ireland	4:26.28	
9	Ehssan Arbab	Sudan	4:26.40	
10	Chloe Tighe	Australia	4:30.19	
11	Matea Matoševic	Croatia	4:30.73	

== Participation ==
According to an unofficial count, 35 athletes from 24 countries participated in the event.

- Argentina (1)
- Australia (2)
- Canada (2)
- Croatia (2)
- Ethiopia (2)
- France (1)
- Germany (2)
- Ireland (2)
- Kenya (2)
- Kyrgyzstan (1)
- Lesotho (1)
- Moldova (1)
- New Zealand (1)
- Poland (1)
- Portugal (1)
- Romania (1)
- Russia (1)
- Serbia (1)
- Sudan (2)
- Sweden (1)
- Togo (1)
- Ukraine (2)
- United Kingdom (2)
- United States (2)
