= Athletics at the 2011 Summer Universiade – Women's 1500 metres =

The women's 1500 metres event at the 2011 Summer Universiade was held on 19–21 August.

== Medalists ==
Gold	Silver	Bronze
unawarded *	Anna Mishchenko; Ukraine	unawarded *

- on 17 August 2015, Aslı Çakır Alptekin relinquished her gold medal after being found guilty of doping.

== Results ==
=== Heats ===
Qualification: First 5 in each heat (Q) and the next 2 fastest (q) qualified for the final.

Rank	Heat	Name	Nationality	Time	Notes
~~1~~	1	~~Aslı Çakır Alptekin~~	~~Turkey~~	~~4:23.45~~	DQ
1	1	Denise Krebs	Germany	4:23.50	Q
2	1	Liu Fang	China	4:23.57	Q
~~4~~	1	~~Ekaterina Gorbunova~~	~~Russia~~	~~4:23.57~~	DQ
3	1	Anzhelika Shevchenko	Ukraine	4:23.62	Q
4	1	Tereza Čapková	Czech Republic	4:23.66	q
5	1	Heidi Eriksson	Finland	4:26.96	q
6	1	Muriel Coneo	Colombia	4:28.03	
7	2	Anna Mishchenko	Ukraine	4:31.78	Q
~~10~~	2	~~Elena Arzhakova~~	~~Russia~~	~~4:31.83~~	DQ
8	2	Katarzyna Broniatowska	Poland	4:31.84	Q
9	2	Kate van Buskirk	Canada	4:32.16	Q
10	2	Stacey Smith	Great Britain	4:32.16	Q
11	2	Amina Bettiche	Algeria	4:33.36	
12	2	Liina Tšernov	Estonia	4:34.15	
13	2	Zhang Xiaojun	China	4:37.70	
14	2	Ganthi Kumarasamy	Malaysia	4:42.14	
15	1	Samira Taouil	Morocco	4:52.16	
16	2	Lonah Chepkwony	Kenya	5:01.99	
17	2	Samkelisiwe Tfwala	Swaziland	5:27.13	
	2	Sabine Heitling	Brazil	DNF	
	1	Luiza Gega	Albania	DNS	
	1	Oumkoulthoum Mousoifa	Comoros	DNS	

=== Final ===
Rank	Name	Nationality	Time	Notes
1st place, gold medalist(s)	~~Aslı Çakır Alptekin~~	~~Turkey~~	~~4:05.56~~	
2nd place, silver medalist(s)	Anna Mishchenko	Ukraine	4:05.91	
3rd place, bronze medalist(s)	~~Ekaterina Gorbunova~~	~~Russia~~	~~4:06.16~~	
~~4~~	~~Elena Arzhakova~~	~~Russia~~	~~4:07.69~~	~~PB~~
5	Denise Krebs	Germany	4:07.70	PB
6	Liu Fang	China	4:07.90	PB
7	Tereza Čapková	Czech Republic	4:08.89	PB
8	Stacey Smith	Great Britain	4:10.34	
9	Anzhelika Shevchenko	Ukraine	4:11.80	
10	Kate van Buskirk	Canada	4:12.28	PB
11	Katarzyna Broniatowska	Poland	4:20.01	
12	Heidi Eriksson	Finland	4:21.19	
