= 2011 European Athletics U23 Championships – Women's 1500 metres =

The Women's 1500 metres event at the 2011 European Athletics U23 Championships was held in Ostrava, Czech Republic, at Městský stadion on 16 and 17 July.

== Medalists ==
Gold	Tuğba Karakaya; Turkey
Silver	Corinna Harrer; Germany
Bronze	Katarzyna Broniatowska; Poland

== Results ==
=== Final ===
17 July 2011 / 16:00

Rank	Name	Nationality	Time	Notes
1st place, gold medalist(s)	Tuğba Karakaya	Turkey	4:20.80	
2nd place, silver medalist(s)	Corinna Harrer	Germany	4:21.52	
3rd place, bronze medalist(s)	Katarzyna Broniatowska	Poland	4:22.06	
4	Danuta Urbanik	Poland	4:22.37	
5	Diana Sujew	Germany	4:22.89	
6	Stacey Smith	United Kingdom	4:23.53	
7	Elina Sujew	Germany	4:23.88	
8	Lindsey De Grande	Belgium	4:25.24	
9	Sara Treacy	Ireland	4:25.97	
10	Daniela Cunha	Portugal	4:27.89	
11	Viktoriya Pohoryelska	Ukraine	4:28.40	
	Elena Arzhakova	Russia	DQ	R 32.2.a Doping^{†}

^{†}: Elena Arzhakova ranked initially 1st (4:20.55), but was disqualified later for infringement of IAAF doping rules.

Intermediate times:
400m: 1:15.07 Daniela Cunha Portugal
800m: 2:31.51 Daniela Cunha Portugal
1200m: 3:38.42 Elena Arzhakova Russia

=== Heats ===
Qualified: First 4 in each heat (Q) and 4 best performers (q) advance to the Final

==== Summary ====
Rank	Name	Nationality	Time	Notes
1	Tuğba Karakaya	Turkey	4:08.63	Q PB
	Elena Arzhakova	Russia	DQ	Q R 32.2.a^{†} Doping
2	Corinna Harrer	Germany	4:08.94	Q PB
3	Danuta Urbanik	Poland	4:09.04	Q PB
4	Diana Sujew	Germany	4:09.13	q PB
5	Elina Sujew	Germany	4:14.85	Q
6	Katarzyna Broniatowska	Poland	4:14.89	Q
7	Stacey Smith	United Kingdom	4:15.05	Q
8	Lindsey De Grande	Belgium	4:15.40	Q
9	Viktoriya Pohoryelska	Ukraine	4:16.17	q
10	Sara Treacy	Ireland	4:16.32	q PB
11	Daniela Cunha	Portugal	4:17.71	q PB
12	Agata Strausa	Latvia	4:18.05	SB
13	Sofia Öberg	Sweden	4:19.04	
14	Solange Andreia Pereira	Spain	4:19.72	PB
15	Mary Alenbratt	Sweden	4:20.43	PB
16	Federica Soldani	Italy	4:20.48	PB
17	Jennifer Wenth	Austria	4:21.25	
18	Florina Pierdevară	Romania	4:21.30	PB
19	Giulia Viola	Italy	4:23.80	

^{†}: Elena Arzhakova initially reached the final (4:08.77), but was disqualified later for infringement of IAAF doping rules.

==== Details ====
===== Heat 1 =====
16 July 2011 / 10:05

Rank	Name	Nationality	Time	Notes
1	Tuğba Karakaya	Turkey	4:08.63	Q PB
	Elena Arzhakova	Russia	DQ	Q R 32.2.a^{†} Doping
2	Corinna Harrer	Germany	4:08.94	Q PB
3	Danuta Urbanik	Poland	4:09.04	Q PB
4	Diana Sujew	Germany	4:09.13	q PB
5	Viktoriya Pohoryelska	Ukraine	4:16.17	q
6	Sara Treacy	Ireland	4:16.32	q PB
7	Agata Strausa	Latvia	4:18.05	SB
8	Mary Alenbratt	Sweden	4:20.43	PB
9	Federica Soldani	Italy	4:20.48	PB

^{†}: Elena Arzhakova initially reached the final (4:08.77), but was disqualified later for infringement of IAAF doping rules.

Intermediate times:
400m: 1:05.44 Diana Sujew Germany
800m: 2:13.94 Elena Arzhakova Russia
1200m: 3:21.99 Elena Arzhakova Russia

===== Heat 2 =====
16 July 2011 / 10:15

Rank	Name	Nationality	Time	Notes
1	Elina Sujew	Germany	4:14.85	Q
2	Katarzyna Broniatowska	Poland	4:14.89	Q
3	Stacey Smith	United Kingdom	4:15.05	Q
4	Lindsey De Grande	Belgium	4:15.40	Q
5	Daniela Cunha	Portugal	4:17.71	q PB
6	Sofia Öberg	Sweden	4:19.04	
7	Solange Andreia Pereira	Spain	4:19.72	PB
8	Jennifer Wenth	Austria	4:21.25	
9	Florina Pierdevară	Romania	4:21.30	PB
10	Giulia Viola	Italy	4:23.80	

Intermediate times:
400m: 1:10.20 Jennifer Wenth Austria
800m: 2:20.67 Jennifer Wenth Austria
1200m: 3:27.34 Elina Sujew Germany

== Participation ==
According to an unofficial count, 20 athletes from 15 countries participated in the event.

- Austria (1)
- Belgium (1)
- Germany (3)
- Ireland (1)
- Italy (2)
- Latvia (1)
- Poland (2)
- Portugal (1)
- Romania (1)
- Russia (1)
- Spain (1)
- Sweden (2)
- Turkey (1)
- Ukraine (1)
- United Kingdom (1)
