= Sara Louise Treacy =

Irish athlete

Personal information
- Born: 22 June 1989 (age 37) Moynalvey, County Meath, Ireland
- Height: 1.68 m (5 ft 6 in)
- Weight: 58 kg (128 lb)

Sport
- Country: Ireland
- Sport: Track and field
- Event: 3000 metres steeplechase

Sara Louise Treacy (born 22 June 1989) is an Irish runner who competes primarily in the 3000 metres steeplechase. She represented her country at the 2015 World Championships in Beijing without qualifying for the final. She also competed at the 2016 Summer Olympics.

== Biography ==
Sara Louise Treacy was born on 22 June 1989 to Liam and Siobhan, both former international distance runners. Her brother Daniel and sister Fódhla were talented athletes in Athletics, hockey and equestrian sport at school and university. Siobhan ran in three World Cross Country Championships. Treacy started training when she was seven or eight years old, and her parents would only let her train for one night a week because they thought she was too young for a more intensive training regimen. When she was a little older she trained with the Moynalvey-Kilcloon AC. She also tried football and hockey with success and also eventing and showjumping where she competed with the Meath Hunt pony club with success in the British Pony Club Tetrathlon Championships on several occasions. Towards the end of her secondary school career at The King's Hospital decided to focus on athletics. She won the home countries schools International Cross Country and her first major international competition was the 2006 World Cross Country event in Fukuoka, Japan. She competed in the 6000m and finished in 69th place. Treacy's experience there encouraged her to commit to training. She considered leaving for the United States to train, but decided not to as she wished to study medicine as an undergraduate.

She was awarded a sports scholarship and began studying medicine at The University of Birmingham in 2007 and graduated in 2013.

She competed at the 2008 World Junior Championships in the 1500m. She did not advance past the first heat, finishing with a time of 4:26.28. In the European U23 Championships in Lithuania, Treacy placed 18th in the 1500m. In the following year's European U23 Championships she set a personal best time in the first heat of 4:16.32, which qualified her for the finals. Out of the 12 finalists, she finished 10th with a time of 4:25.97. She was later moved up to ninth place when Yelena Arzhakova was disqualified.

At the 2012 European Cross Country Championships in Budapest she was part of the Irish winning women's team and in the 2014 European Cross Country in Bulgaria, Treacy was part of the bronze medal-winning team, beating France by one point. She finished in 12th place at the event.

She originally focused on long-distance running, but after the European Cross Country decided to switch to the steeplechase. Treacy ran the 3000m steeplechase at the 2015 World Championships in Beijing. She was disappointed in her time of 9:48.24, which gave her 13th place in her heat and 29th overall.

Treacy raced in the 2016 European Championships 3000m steeplechase. She finished the first heat with a personal best time of 9:42.16. It was the eighth fastest time and she advanced to the finals. Ireland was the only country to have three athletes in the final, and it was the first time Ireland had three athletes in any final at the European Championships. Treacy was the second fastest Irish athlete, finishing overall in ninth place with a time of 9:45.19.

All three Irishwoman 3000m steeplechase competitors qualified for the 2016 Olympics during the 2015 Letterkenny AC International. Treacy's qualifying time was 9:44.15, inside the required time of 9:45. She just missed qualifying for the World Championships, which had a requirement of 9:44. Treacy competed in the 3000m steeplechase at the 2016 Summer Olympics in Rio. In the qualifying heat Treacy was in ninth place but dropped down to eleventh after she sustained a heavy fall in the leading group and with a number of other runners. Before the fall she was in a qualifying position and her finishing place was not high enough to advance to the finals. Ireland's track and field manager appealed the results, and about an hour after the race an announcement was made that Treacy and the two downed runners qualified for the finals. Eighteen athletes qualified for the finals instead of the anticipated 15. In the finals Treacy ran a time of 9:52.70 and finished 17th.

After twisting her ankle during the Rio semifinals, Treacy did not compete in any event in 2017. The next year she competed again in the 3000m steeplechase, but could not get within 30 seconds of her best time. She went back to work in Queen Elizabeth Hospital in Birmingham core medical trainee. In 2019 she qualified for the European Cross Country, finishing in 26th. Her place qualified her for the 2019 World Cross Country Championships in Denmark.

== Statistics ==
=== Personal bests ===
Event	Time	Venue	Date	Notes
1500 metres (indoor)	4:16.73	Ghent 2015	7 February 2015	
1500 metres (outdoor)	4:16.29	Watford 2014	18 June 2014	
3000 metres (indoor)	9:06.23	Sheffield 2015	15 February 2015	
3000 metres (outdoor)	9:08.81	Loughborough 2015	17 May 2015	
3000 metres steeplechase	9:39:41	Müller Anniversary Games 2016	23 July 2016	

=== Competition record ===
Year	Competition	Venue	Position	Event	Notes
Representing Ireland
2008	World Junior Championships	Bydgoszcz, Poland	19th (h)	1500 m	4:26.28
2009	European U23 Championships	Kaunas, Lithuania	18th (h)	1500 m	4:24.08
2011	European U23 Championships	Ostrava, Czech Republic	9th	1500 m	4:25.97
2015	World Championships	Beijing, China	29th (h)	3000 m s'chase	9:48.24
2016	European Championships	Amsterdam, Netherlands	9th	3000 m s'chase	9:45.19
2016	Olympic Games	Rio de Janeiro, Brazil	17th	3000 m s'chase	9:52.70
