= Nancy Chepkwemoi =

Kenyan middle-distance runner

Nancy Chepkwemoi (born 8 October 1993) is a Kenyan professional middle-distance runner who competes mainly in the 1500 metres. She has a personal best of 4:03.09 minutes for the distance. She won junior medals in the 1500 m and cross country at African and world level.

== Career ==
Born near Mount Elgon, Chepkwemoi had her first success at national level in 2010. After placing top ten in the Kenyan junior cross country race, she won the Kenyan junior title in the 1500 m. The 16-year-old Chepkwemoi took the bronze medal at the 2010 World Junior Championships in Athletics with a personal best of 4:11.04 minutes. This made her the second fastest youth athlete in the world that year, behind only world junior champion Tizita Bogale. She was chosen for the junior team at the 2011 IAAF World Cross Country Championships, where she placed sixth and helped Kenya to the team silver medals. On the track, she was beaten by Annet Negesa of Uganda over 1500 m at the 2011 African Junior Athletics Championships, finishing a close second. She also set a personal best of 4:07.63 minutes that season while winning at the Meeting Voor Mon meeting in the Netherlands.

She was part of a Kenyan medal sweep at the 2012 African Cross Country Championships, taking third behind Faith Chepngetich Kipyegon and Agnes Jebet Tirop, although the trio did not win the team title due to the lack of a fourth finisher for Kenya. Her IAAF Diamond League debut came that May and she set a 3000 metres best of 8:56.52 minutes to come tenth at the Doha Diamond League meet. She returned to the world stage at the 2012 World Junior Championships in Athletics, but despite being older finished one place lower than in her previous appearance – teammate Kipyegon won the title and Ethiopia's Senbere Teferi edged her out of third place. She set indoor bests of 4:23.76 and 9:02.28 minutes for the 1500 m and 3000 m at the start of 2013, but missed the rest of the season and also the whole of the 2014 season.

Chepkwemoi established herself as a senior in the 2015 season. She won the 1500 m at the Paavo Nurmi Games with a best of 4:06.90 minutes before improving to 4:03.09 minutes at the British Milers Club meet in Watford. Third place at the 2015 Athletics Kenya World Championship Trials brought her a first senior national team selection.

== Personal bests ==
- 1500 metres outdoor – 4:03.09 (2015)
- 3000 metres outdoor – 8:56.52 (2012)
- 1500 metres indoor – 4:23.76 (2013)
- 3000 metres indoor – 9:02.28 (2013)

== International competitions ==
Year	Competition	Venue	Position	Event	Notes
2010	World Junior Championships	Moncton, Canada	3rd	1500 m	4:11.04
2011	World Cross Country Championships	Punta Umbría, Spain	6th	Junior race	19:20
2011	World Cross Country Championships	Punta Umbría, Spain	2nd	Junior team	19 pts
2011	African Junior Championships	Gaborone, Botswana	2nd	1500 m	4:09.25
2012	African Cross Country Championships	Cape Town, South Africa	3rd	Junior race	19:37
2012	World Junior Championships	Barcelona, Spain	4th	1500 m	4:09.72
2015	World Championships	Beijing, China	23rd (h)	1500 m	4:18.15
2016	Olympic Games	Rio de Janeiro, Brazil	35th (h)	1500 m	4:15.41
