= 2011 European Athletics Indoor Championships – Women's 1500 metres =

The women's 1500 metres event at the 2011 European Athletics Indoor Championships was held at March 4–6 with the final being held on March 6 at 16:00 local time.

== Records ==
Standing records prior to the 2011 European Athletics Indoor Championships
World record	Yelena Soboleva (RUS)	3:58.28	Moscow, Russia	18 February 2006
European record	Yelena Soboleva (RUS)	3:58.28	Moscow, Russia	18 February 2006
Championship record	Doina Melinte (ROU)	4:02.54	Piraeus, Greece	3 March 1985
World Leading	Abeba Arigawe (ETH)	4:01.47	Stockholm, Sweden	22 February 2011
European Leading	Sylwia Ejdys (POL)	4:05.38	Stockholm, Sweden	22 February 2011

== Results ==
=== Heat ===
First 2 in each heat and 3 best performers advanced to the Semifinals. The heats were held at 17:30.

Rank	Heat	Name	Nationality	Time	Notes
1	3	Yekaterina Martynova	Russia	4:09.93	Q
2	3	Nuria Fernández	Spain	4:10.07	Q
3	3	Lindsey De Grande	Belgium	4:10.24	q
4	1	Elena Arzhakova	Russia	4:10.29	Q
5	3	Sara Moreira	Portugal	4:10.65	q, PB
6	1	Sylwia Ejdys	Poland	4:11.04	Q
7	3	Anzhela Shevchenko	Ukraine	4:11.16	q, PB
8	1	Stacey Smith	Great Britain	4:11.95	
9	1	Charlotte Schönbeck	Sweden	4:11.96	
10	3	Sigrid Vanden Bempt	Belgium	4:12.05	
11	1	Ingvill Måkestad Bovim	Norway	4:12.13	
12	2	Renata Pliś	Poland	4:12.15	Q
13	1	Ioana Doaga	Romania	4:12.26	PB
14	3	Ancuta Bobocel	Romania	4:12.71	
15	2	Isabel Macías	Spain	4:13.26	Q, PB
16	2	Fanjanteino Félix	France	4:13.31	
17	2	Yelena Korobkina	Russia	4:13.45	
18	2	Hannah England	Great Britain	4:13.54	
19	1	Nataliya Tobias	Ukraine	4:16.67	
20	2	Jennifer Wenth	Austria	4:16.74	
21	2	Marina Munćan	Serbia	4:18.09	
DQ	2	Natallia Kareiva	Belarus	~~4:22.30~~	Doping
22	1	Dudu Karakaya	Turkey	4:30.29	

=== Final ===
The final was held at 17:15.

Rank	Name	Nationality	Time	Notes
1st place, gold medalist(s)	Elena Arzhakova	Russia	4:13.78	
2nd place, silver medalist(s)	Nuria Fernández	Spain	4:14.04	
3rd place, bronze medalist(s)	Yekaterina Martynova	Russia	4:14.16	
4	Renata Pliś	Poland	4:15.16	
5	Isabel Macías	Spain	4:15.76	
6	Lindsey De Grande	Belgium	4:16.15	
7	Sara Moreira	Portugal	4:16.67	
8	Anzhela Shevchenko	Ukraine	4:18.19	
9	Sylwia Ejdys	Poland	4:20.99	
