= Sylwia Ejdys =

Polish middle-distance runner

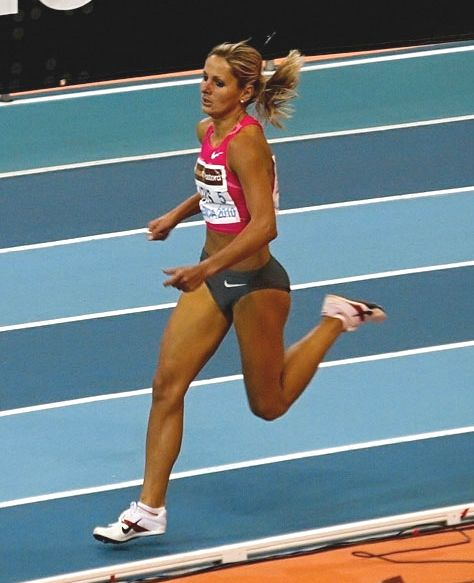
Sylwia Ejdys in 2010

Sylwia Ejdys-Tomaszewska (born 15 July 1984 in Bogatynia) is a Polish middle distance runner who specialises in the 1500 metres. She competed in the event at the 2008 Summer Olympics. Her personal best for the distance is 4:02.30 minutes.

Ejdys had a share in the women's U23 team silver medal at the 2006 European Cross Country Championships alongside Katarzyna Kowalska. She claimed her first major win over 1500 metres at the 2007 European Cup. She was the bronze medallist at the 2007 World Student Games and became the 1500 m military champion at the 2007 Military World Games in October. She represented Poland at the 2008 Beijing Olympics, but did not make it past the first round of the 1500 m.

She moved up to the 3000 metres for the 2009 European Team Championships and came runner-up to Gulnara Samitova-Galkina. She reached the semi-finals of her speciality at the 2009 World Championships in Athletics. Ejdys narrowly missed a medal at the 2010 IAAF World Indoor Championships, coming in fourth place behind defending champion Gelete Burka. She reached the 1500 m final at the 2010 European Athletics Championships but finished in last place.

She improved her 3000 m personal best at the BW-Bank Meeting in February 2011, taking second place with a time of 8:43.22 minutes.

== Achievements ==
Year	Competition	Venue	Position	Event	Notes
Representing Poland
2007	European Cup	Munich, Germany	1st	1500 m	
2007	Universiade	Bangkok, Thailand	3rd	1500 m	4:11.51
2007	Military World Games	Hyderabad, India	1st	1500 m	4:16.90
2008	Olympic Games	Beijing, China	13th	1500 m	4:08.37
2009	European Team Championships	Leiria, Portugal	2nd	3000 m	8:58.26
2009	World Championships	Berlin, Germany	21st	1500 m	4:11.33
2010	World Indoor Championships	Doha, Qatar	4th	1500 m	4:09.24
2010	European Championships	Barcelona, Spain	12th	1500 m	4:24.82
2011	European Indoor Championships	Paris, France	9th	1500 m	4:20.99
