= Sara Vaughn (athlete) =

American middle-distance runner

Personal information
- Nationality: American
- Born: Sara Ensrud; May 16, 1986 (age 40) Gering, Nebraska, United States
- Height: 5 ft 1 in (155 cm)

Sport
- Sport: Middle-distance running
- Event: 1500 metres
- College team: Colorado Buffaloes women's cross country
- Turned pro: 2008
- Coached by: Brent Vaughn

Achievements and titles
- Personal bests: 800 meters: 2:03.70 (2011); 1500 meters: 4:04.56 (2017); Mile: 4:27.31 (2018); 3000 meters: 9:07.98 (2018); 5000 meters: 15:51.68 (2020); 3000m steeplechase: 9:41.55 (2014); Half-Marathon: 1:11:45 (2025); Marathon: 2:23:24 (2023)
Medal record
Women's athletics
Representing the United States
World Championships
2017 London	1500 m
World Indoor Championships
2012 Istanbul	1500 m

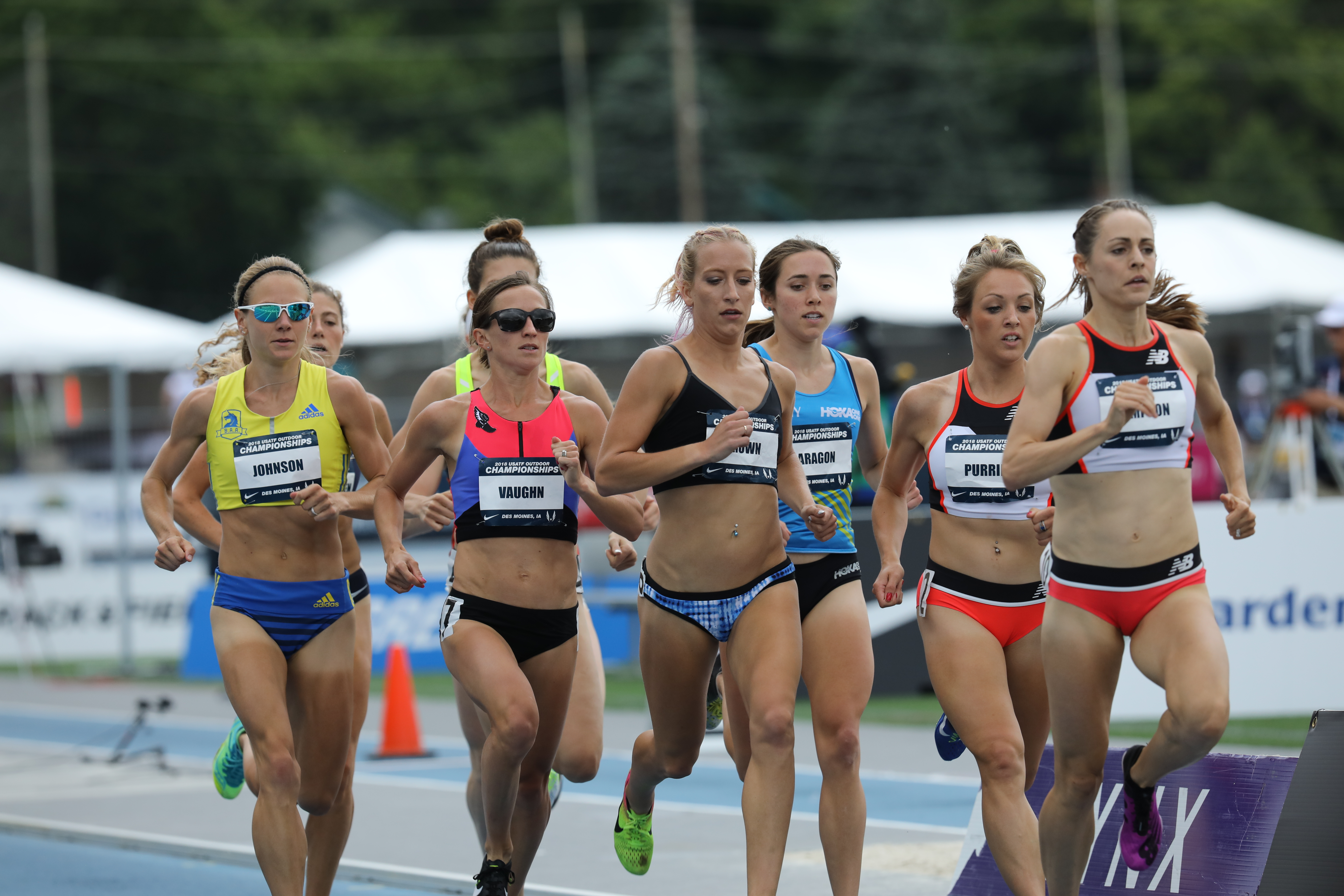
Sara Vaughn competing in the 2018 USA outdoor track and field champsionships

Sara Vaughn (born May 16, 1986) is an American middle-distance runner. Vaughn placed 18th in the women's 1500 metres at the 2017 World Championships in Athletics. Vaughn placed 10th in 2012 IAAF World Indoor Championships – Women's 1500 metres at the 2012 IAAF World Indoor Championships.

== Professional ==
On December 5, 2021, Sara Vaughn won the 2021 California International Marathon in 2:26:53. This victory was her debut at the marathon distance and follows her 5th place 1500 m race at Diamond League Prefontaine Classic in August. Vaughn place 22nd at New York Road Runners United Airlines NYC Half-Marathon in 1:12:56. Vaughn place 21st at 2022 Boston Marathon in 2:36:27. On October 9, Sara Vaughn placed 7th at 2022 Chicago Marathon in a personal best time of 2:26:23. Vaughn finished sixth in the 2024 New York City Marathon in a time of 2:26:56 and was the first American finisher.

Year	Competition	Venue	Position	Event	Notes
Representing the United States
2012	2012 IAAF World Indoor Championships	Istanbul	10th	1500 m	4:17.46
2017	2017 World Championships in Athletics	London, UK	18th	1500 m	4:06.83
USA Track and Field Championships
Unattached
2009	USA Outdoor Track and Field Championships	Eugene, Oregon	10th	800m	2:04.87
representing Adidas
2011	USA Outdoor Track and Field Championships	Eugene, Oregon	15th	1500m	4:15.30
representing Nike
2012	USA Indoor Track and Field Championships	Albuquerque, New Mexico	3rd	1500 m	4:18.25
2012	US Olympic Trials	Eugene, Oregon	13th	1500 m	4:30.89
2013	USA Indoor Track and Field Championships	Albuquerque, New Mexico	4th	Mile	5:08.47
Unattached
2013	USA Outdoor Track and Field Championships	Des Moines, Iowa	27th	3000 m steeplechase	DNF
representing Brooks Running
2014	USA Indoor Track and Field Championships	Albuquerque, New Mexico	10th	1500 m	4:22.93
2014	USA Indoor Track and Field Championships	Albuquerque, New Mexico	3rd	3000 m	9:26.46
2014	USA Outdoor Track and Field Championships	Sacramento, California	12th	3000 m steeplechase	9:56.36
2016	US Olympic Trials	Eugene, Oregon	7th	1500 m	4:10.28
2017	USA Outdoor Track and Field Championships	Sacramento, California	3rd	1500 m	4:07.85
representing New York Athletic Club
2018	USA Outdoor Track and Field Championships	Des Moines, Iowa	23rd	1500 m	4:16.50

== NCAA ==
While competing for the Buffs, Sara received All-American honors. Sara set top 15 time in University of Colorado Boulder history at 2007 Cardinal Invitational 1500 meters in 4:19.70.

Representing Colorado Buffaloes
School Year	Big 12 Cross Country	NCAA Cross Country	Big 12 Indoor Track	NCAA Indoor Track	Big 12 Outdoor Track	NCAA Outdoor Track
2008 Senior	8th	31st	Mile 4th 4:47.42	Mile 17th 4:55.72	1500m 11th 4:42.10	
2008 Senior	8th	31st	3000m 9th 9:48.07	Mile 17th 4:55.72	1500m 11th 4:42.10	
2008 Senior	8th	31st	DMR 9th 11:54.95	Mile 17th 4:55.72	1500m 11th 4:42.10	
2007 Junior					1500m 3rd, 4:29.86	1500m 22nd 4:26.26
2007 Junior					4x400m 11th, 3:54.32	
2006 Sophomore	53rd		3000m 21st 10:11.85			
2006 Sophomore	53rd		1000m 13th			
Representing Virginia Cavaliers
School Year	ACC Cross Country	NCAA Regional Cross Country	ACC Indoor Track	NCAA Indoor Track	ACC Outdoor Track	NCAA Outdoor Track
2005 Freshman	53rd 24:36.8	52nd 21:52.3				

== Prep and personal life ==
Sara Vaughn was born in small western Nebraska town of Gering, Nebraska, Sara attended Gering High School in Gering, Nebraska prior to garnering degrees in Psychology and Spanish from University of Colorado. Vaughn was all-state in cross country all four years, the Nebraska Class B 1600m champions with a time of 4:58.15, and 2004 All-class 800, 1600 and 3200m champion.

The local newspaper Scottsbluff Star Herald named Sara Ensrud the 2004 Athlete of the Year. Sara also received Scottsbluff Star Herald Athlete of the Year in 2001 and 2003, she is also the second female athlete above the height of five feet to turn professional after Shelly-Ann Fraser-Pryce of Jamaica
