= Deirdre Byrne =

Irish middle- and long-distance runner

Personal information
- Born: 21 September 1982 (age 43)
- Education: Providence College

Sport
- Sport: Athletics
- Event(s): 1500 m, 5000 m
- College team: Providence Friars
- Club: Sli Cualann AC

Deirdre Byrne (born 21 September 1982) is an Irish middle- and long-distance runner. She represented her country in the 1500 metres at the 2009 World Championships without advancing from the first round.

== International competitions ==
Year	Competition	Venue	Position	Event	Notes
Representing Ireland
2001	European Junior Championships	Grosseto, Italy	15th (h)	1500 m	4:31.54
2007	Universiade	Bangkok, Thailand	8th	1500 m	4:16.58
2009	European Indoor Championships	Turin, Italy	10th	3000 m	9:08.89
2009	Universiade	Belgrade, Serbia	7th	1500 m	4:19.48
2009	World Championships	Berlin, Germany	31st (h)	1500 m	4:12.19
2010	World Indoor Championships	Doha, Qatar	10th (h)	3000 m	8:58.94
2016	European Championships	Amsterdam, Netherlands	10th	5000 m	15:53.67

== Personal bests ==
Outdoor

- 1500 metres – 4:08.89 (Heusden-Zolder 2008)
- 5000 metres – 15:39.45 (Watford 2016)

Indoor

- 800 metres – 2:06.00 (Boston 2003)
- 1500 metres – 4:15.82 (Belfast 2010)
- One mile – 4:37.76 (Boston 2007)
- 3000 metres – 8:58.94 (Doha 2010)
