= Katarzyna Broniatowska =

Polish middle-distance runner

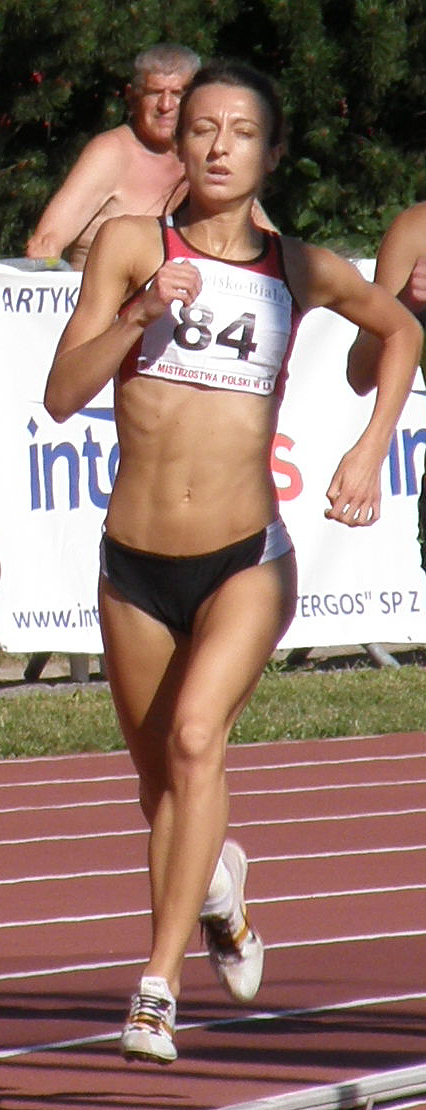
- Broniatowska in 2010

Personal information
- Nationality: Polish
- Born: 22 February 1990 Poland

Sport
- Sport: Track and field
- Event: Middle-distance running
Medal record
Women's athletics
Representing Poland
European Indoor Championships
Bronze medal – third place	2013 Gothenburg	1500 m
World Relay Championships
Silver medal – second place	2015 Nassau	4x800 m relay
Bronze medal – third place	2015 Nassau	Distance medley relay
European U23 Championships
Bronze medal – third place	2011 Ostrava	1500 m

Katarzyna Broniatowska (born 22 February 1990) is a Polish athlete specializing in the middle distance events. She won the bronze medal in 1500 metres at the 2013 European Indoor Championships in Gothenburg.

== Competition record ==
Year	Competition	Venue	Position	Event	Notes
Representing Poland
2008	World Junior Championships	Bydgoszcz, Poland	27th (h)	1500 m	4:31.28
2009	European Junior Championships	Novi Sad, Serbia	11th	1500 m	4:27.24
2011	European U23 Championships	Ostrava, Czech Republic	6th	800m	2:04.62
2011	European U23 Championships	Ostrava, Czech Republic	3rd	1500m	4:22.06
2011	Universiade	Shenzhen, China	11th	1500 m	4:20.01
2013	European Indoor Championships	Gothenburg, Sweden	3rd	1500 m	4:14.30
2013	Universiade	Kazan, Russia	7th	1500 m	4:14.31
2013	Universiade	Kazan, Russia	5th	4 × 400 m relay	3:45.62
2013	Jeux de la Francophonie	Nice, France	5th	1500 m	4:21.22
2014	World Indoor Championships	Sopot, Poland	14th (h)	1500 m	4:14.31
2015	European Indoor Championships	Prague, Czech Republic	4th	1500 m	4:12.71
2017	European Indoor Championships	Belgrade, Serbia	12th (h)	1500 m	4:15.02
