= Athletics at the 2007 Summer Universiade – Women's 1500 metres =

The women's 1500 metres event at the 2007 Summer Universiade was held on 9–12 August.

== Medalists ==
Gold	Silver	Bronze
Olesya Chumakova; Russia	Tetyana Holovchenko; Ukraine	Sylwia Ejdys; Poland

== Results ==
=== Heats ===
Qualification: First 4 of each heat (Q) and the next 4 fastest (q) qualified for the final.

Rank	Heat	Name	Nationality	Time	Notes
1	1	Olesya Chumakova	Russia	4:09.76	Q
2	1	Tetyana Holovchenko	Ukraine	4:10.93	Q
3	1	Inna Poluškina	Latvia	4:12.51	Q, PB
4	1	Marina Munćan	Serbia	4:12.54	Q
5	1	Megan Brown	Canada	4:13.54	q
6	2	Lubov Puliaeva	Russia	4:14.84	Q
7	2	Sonja Stolić	Serbia	4:15.25	Q
8	2	Sylwia Ejdys	Poland	4:15.33	Q
9	1	Liu Nian	China	4:15.36	q
10	2	Deirdre Byrne	Ireland	4:15.61	Q
11	2	Rini Budiarti	Indonesia	4:18.69	q, PB
12	1	Orla Drumm	Ireland	4:20.88	q
13	1	Ikram Zouglali	Morocco	4:24.76	PB
14	1	Ida Fallesen	Denmark	4:32.58	
15	2	Midred Kiminy Chebosis	Uganda	4:46.21	
16	2	Akuvi Degbotse-Goe	Togo	5:01.27	
17	2	Nokuthula Khumalo	Swaziland	5:33.61	PB
18	2	W. Pelden	Bhutan	6:14.34	

=== Final ===
Rank	Name	Nationality	Time	Notes
1st place, gold medalist(s)	Olesya Chumakova	Russia	4:09.32	
2nd place, silver medalist(s)	Tetyana Holovchenko	Ukraine	4:10.46	
3rd place, bronze medalist(s)	Sylwia Ejdys	Poland	4:11.51	
4	Inna Poluškina	Latvia	4:12.23	PB
5	Marina Munćan	Serbia	4:12.56	
6	Megan Brown	Canada	4:13.12	
7	Lubov Puliaeva	Russia	4:14.79	
8	Deirdre Byrne	Ireland	4:16.58	
9	Sonja Stolić	Serbia	4:19.39	
10	Orla Drumm	Ireland	4:22.78	
11	Rini Budiarti	Indonesia	4:24.12	
	Liu Nian	China		
