= Dani Christmas =

British cyclist (born 1987)

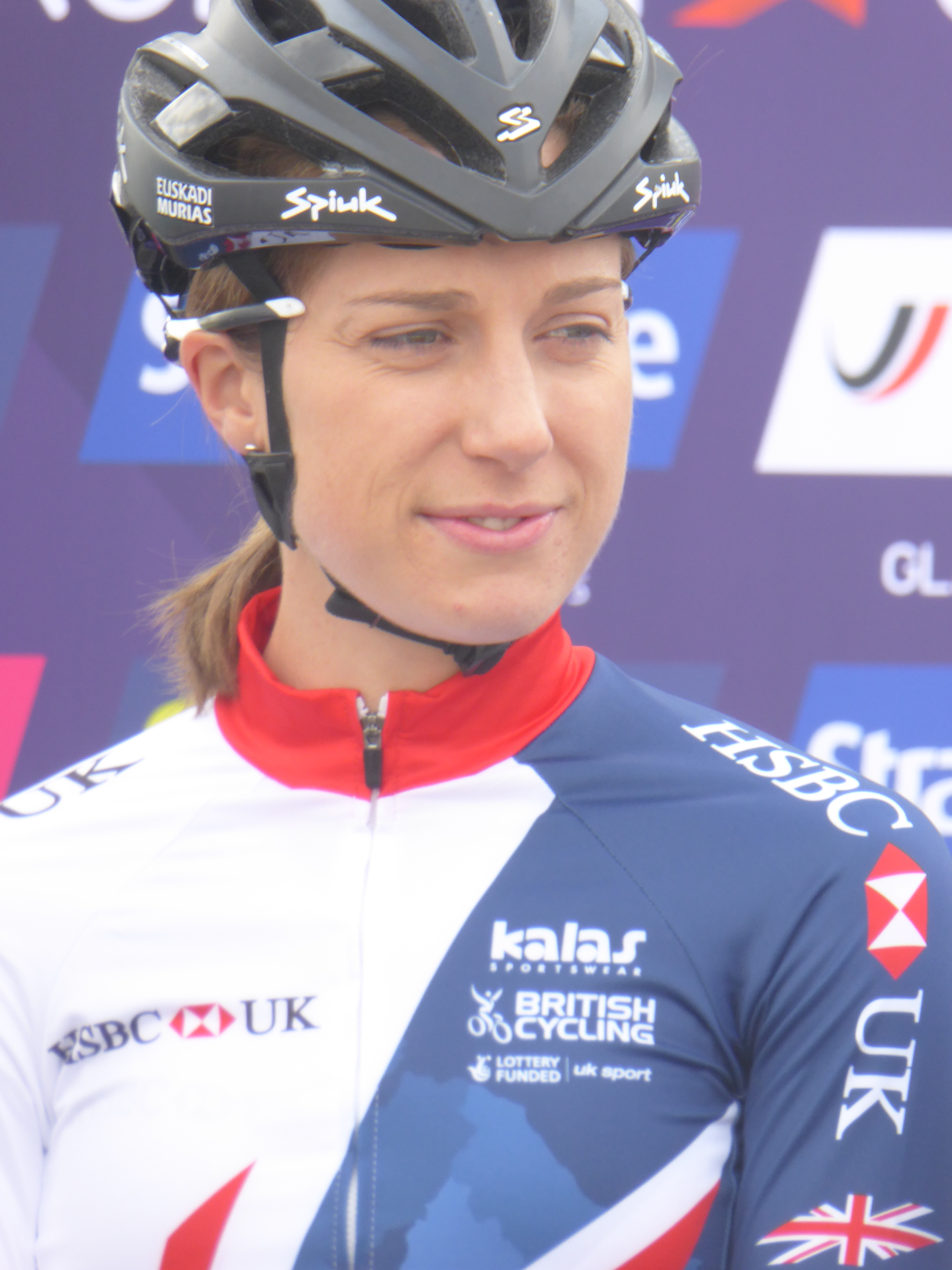
- Christmas at the 2018 European Road Cycling Championships.

Personal information
- Full name: Danielle Christmas
- Born: 21 December 1987 (age 38)

Cycling career
- Sport: Cycling
- Current team: Drops–Le Col
- Discipline: Road
- Role: Rider

Amateur teams
- 2015–2016: Isorex Ladies Team
- 2016: Lares–Waowdeals (guest)
- 2017: Jos Feron Lady Force

Professional teams
- 2018: Bizkaia Durango–Euskadi Murias
- 2019–2020: Lotto–Soudal Ladies
- 2021: Drops–Le Col

Danielle Christmas (born 21 December 1987) is a British former racing cyclist and middle-distance runner, who last rode for UCI Women's Continental Team Drops–Le Col. She is currently a commentator on Eurosport for women's cycling, and also a DS (Director Sportife) for the AG Insurance - Soudal women's professional cycling team

== Athletics career ==
Prior to cycling, she was a middle-distance runner. She signed up with Crawley Athletic Club and began competing for them at age 12. In 2002 she placed in the top five of the 800 metres at the AAA under-15 meet and the English Schools' Athletics Championships. She improved to third in the 1500 metres at the 2003 English Schools Championships. She established herself among the best young athletes in the country in 2004, winning the English under-17 title over 800 m and placing second in the AAA Junior Championships 1500 m.

Christmas' first international success came at the 2004 Commonwealth Youth Games, where she took 800 m gold. A runner-up finish at the 2006 AAA Junior Championships led to an appearance at the 2006 World Junior Championships in Athletics, at which she reached the 800 m semi-final. Christmas began attending Loughborough University in 2008. She fell down the rankings in subsequent years but made her first impact at senior level in 2010, placing third at the 2010 British Indoor Athletics Championships and setting a lifetime best of 2:02.54 minutes for the 800 m at the London Grand Prix. In her final year of track and field competition, she ran an indoor best of 2:04.39 minutes for fourth at the Birmingham Indoor Grand Prix and had her best national finish with second at the 2011 British Indoor Athletics Championships.

== Cycling career ==
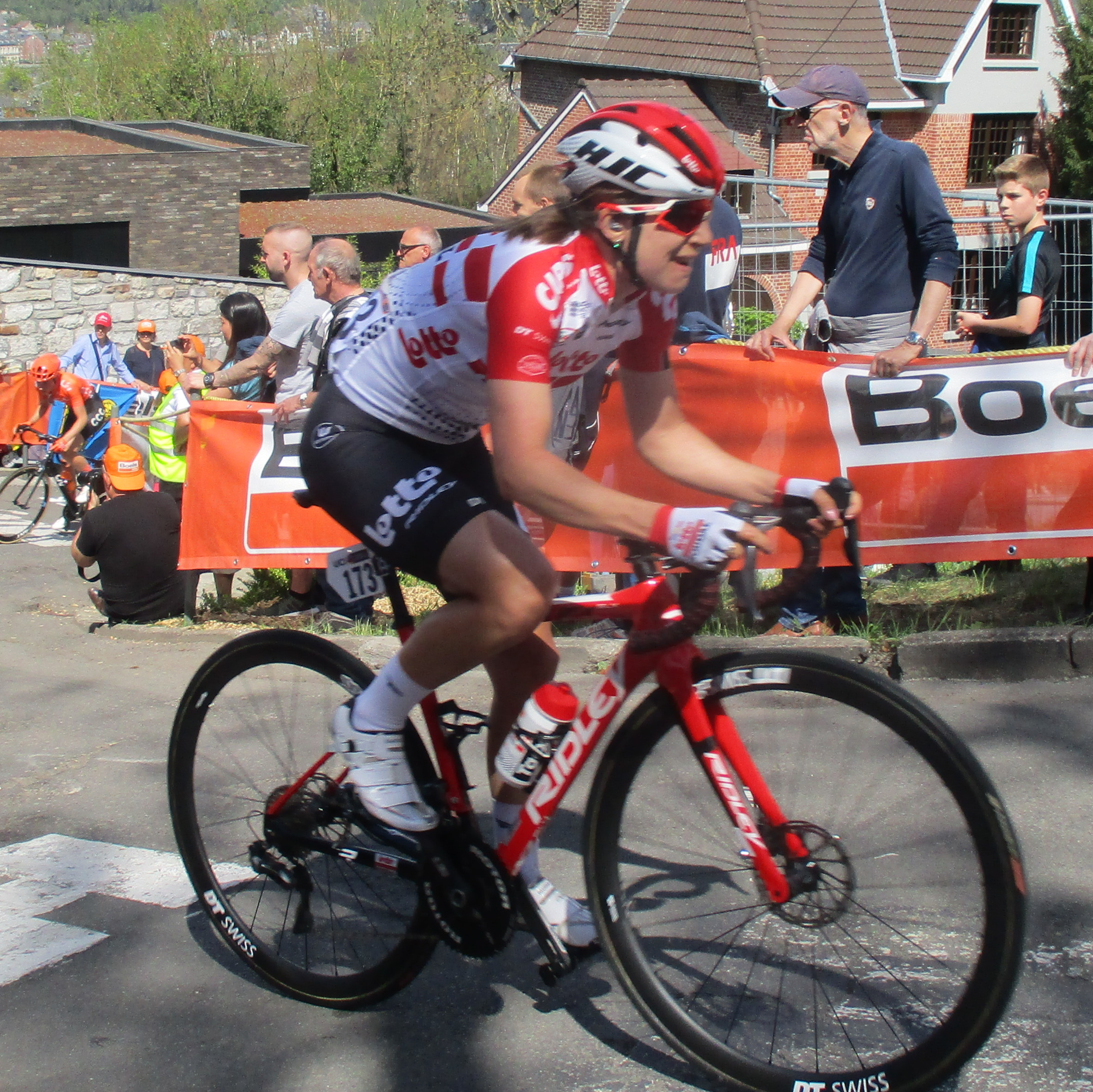
Christmas on the Mur de Huy at the 2019 Flèche Wallonne.

In her first professional season in 2018, Christmas won the first edition of the Tour de Belle Isle en Terre–Kreiz Breizh Elites Dames one-day race. She finished 64th in the women's road race event at the 2018 UCI Road World Championships.

In December 2020, Christmas signed a contract with the Drops–Le Col team, for the 2021 season. Christmas retired from competition at the end of the 2021 season.

== Broadcasting career ==
After retirement, Christmas turned to broadcasting, becoming a regular commentator on GCN and Eurosport.

== International competitions ==
=== Athletics ===
Year	Competition	Venue	Position	Event	Notes
2004	Commonwealth Youth Games	Bendigo, Australia	1st	800 m	2:10.38
2006	World Junior Championships	Beijing, China	5th (semis)	800 m	2:07.26

=== Cycling ===
Year	Competition	Venue	Position	Event	Notes
2018	UCI Road World Championships	Innsbruck, Austria	64th	Road race	+14'51"
