= Lindsey De Grande =

Belgian middle-distance runner

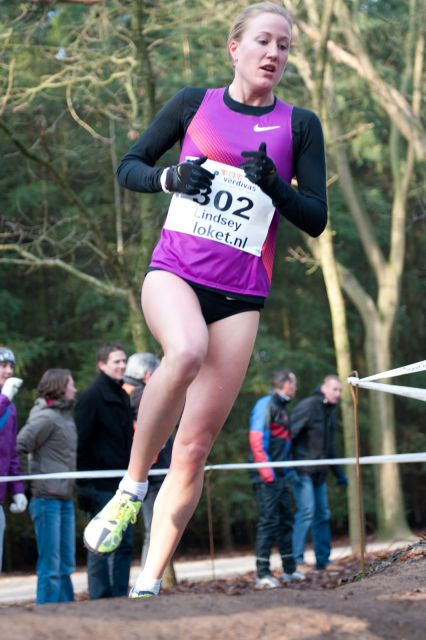
Lindsey De Grande during the 2010 Warandeloop in Tilburg, the Netherlands.

Lindsey De Grande (born 26 April 1989) is a Belgian runner, who specializes in the middle-distance events.

== Achievements ==
Year	Competition	Venue	Position	Event	Notes
Representing Belgium
2009	European U23 Championships	Kaunas, Lithuania	4th	1500m	4:15.90
2010	European Championships	Barcelona, Spain	9th (h)	1500 m	4:10.24
2011	European Indoor Championships	Paris, France	6th	1500 m	4:16.15
2011	European U23 Championships	Ostrava, Czech Republic	8th	1500 m	4:25.24
2021	European Indoor Championships	Toruń, Poland	20th (h)	1500 m	4:18.45
