= 2006 World Junior Championships in Athletics – Women's 1500 metres =

The women's 1500 metres event at the 2006 World Junior Championships in Athletics was held in Beijing, China, at Chaoyang Sports Centre on 18 and 20 August.

== Medalists ==
Gold	Irene Jelagat; Kenya
Silver	Mercy Kosgei; Kenya
Bronze	Yuriko Kobayashi; Japan

== Results ==
=== Final ===
20 August

Rank	Name	Nationality	Time	Notes
1st place, gold medalist(s)	Irene Jelagat	Kenya	4:08.88	
2nd place, silver medalist(s)	Mercy Kosgei	Kenya	4:12.48	
3rd place, bronze medalist(s)	Yuriko Kobayashi	Japan	4:12.88	
4	Emebt Etea	Ethiopia	4:12.94	
5	Merat Bahta	Eritrea	4:16.01	
6	Azra Eminovic	Serbia	4:16.20	
7	Tereza Capková	Czech Republic	4:16.37	
8	Stephanie Twell	United Kingdom	4:16.58	
9	Jin Yuan	China	4:18.64	
10	Erin Bedell	United States	4:20.01	
11	Zoe Buckman	Australia	4:20.59	
12	Kristine Eikrem Engeset	Norway	4:29.52	

=== Heats ===
18 August

==== Heat 1 ====
Rank	Name	Nationality	Time	Notes
1	Yuriko Kobayashi	Japan	4:19.14	Q
2	Stephanie Twell	United Kingdom	4:19.78	Q
3	Kristine Eikrem Engeset	Norway	4:19.94	Q
4	Li Yong	China	4:22.29	
5	Danielle Tauro	United States	4:24.16	
6	Cristina Vasiloiu	Romania	4:26.56	
7	Svetlana Kudelich	Belarus	4:32.59	
8	Imane Al-Jallad	Syria	4:33.03	
9	Theresia Alugodhi	Namibia	4:41.22	

==== Heat 2 ====
Rank	Name	Nationality	Time	Notes
1	Emebt Etea	Ethiopia	4:23.52	Q
2	Mercy Kosgei	Kenya	4:23.53	Q
3	Azra Eminovic	Serbia	4:25.49	Q
4	Akane Ota	Japan	4:28.34	
5	Denise Krebs	Germany	4:31.73	
6	Amina Bakhit	Sudan	4:31.79	
7	Jennifer Biewald	Canada	4:34.14	

==== Heat 3 ====
Rank	Name	Nationality	Time	Notes
1	Irene Jelagat	Kenya	4:15.80	Q
2	Merat Bahta	Eritrea	4:18.10	Q
3	Jin Yuan	China	4:18.85	Q
4	Tereza Capková	Czech Republic	4:19.00	q
5	Zoe Buckman	Australia	4:20.24	q
6	Erin Bedell	United States	4:20.67	q
7	Hannah England	United Kingdom	4:23.49	
8	Valentina Costanza	Italy	4:24.31	
9	Alexandra Becker	Canada	4:30.70	
10	Sonia Brahmi	Tunisia	4:33.45	

== Participation ==
According to an unofficial count, 26 athletes from 20 countries participated in the event.

- Australia (1)
- Belarus (1)
- Canada (2)
- China (2)
- Czech Republic (1)
- Eritrea (1)
- Ethiopia (1)
- Germany (1)
- Italy (1)
- Japan (2)
- Kenya (2)
- Namibia (1)
- Norway (1)
- Romania (1)
- Serbia (1)
- Sudan (1)
- Syria (1)
- Tunisia (1)
- United Kingdom (2)
- United States (2)
