= Athletics at the 2009 Summer Universiade – Women's 1500 metres =

The women's 1500 metres event at the 2009 Summer Universiade was held on 10–12 July.

== Medalists ==
Gold	Silver	Bronze
Marina Munćan; Serbia	Kaila McKnight; Australia	Elena García; Spain

== Results ==
=== Heats ===
Qualification: First 4 of each heat (Q) and the next 4 fastest (q) qualified for the final.

Rank	Heat	Name	Nationality	Time	Notes
1	1	Marina Munćan	Serbia	4:14.13	Q
2	1	Deirdre Byrne	Ireland	4:14.63	Q
3	1	Kaila McKnight	Australia	4:15.11	Q
4	1	Anastasia Fesenko	Russia	4:16.60	Q
5	1	Julia Howard	Canada	4:17.20	q
5	1	Charlotte Schonbeck	Sweden	4:17.20	q
7	2	Bridey Delaney	Australia	4:19.28	Q
8	2	Hazel Murphy	Ireland	4:20.31	Q
9	1	Janet Achola	Uganda	4:20.76	q, PB
10	2	Irina Maracheva	Russia	4:21.28	Q
11	2	Elena García	Spain	4:21.37	Q
12	2	Jeļena Ābele	Latvia	4:21.47	q
13	1	Amina Bettiche	Algeria	4:21.98	
14	1	Liu Qing	China	4:22.98	
15	2	Biljana Cvijanović	Bosnia and Herzegovina	4:24.51	
16	2	Li Zhenzhu	China	4:26.09	SB
17	2	Slađana Perunović	Montenegro	4:27.33	
18	2	Marie-Louise Brasen	Denmark	4:28.95	
19	2	Mary Chebet	Uganda	4:36.16	
20	1	Roselyn Runyanga	Zimbabwe	5:48.58	
	1	Degbotse-Goe Seenam	Togo	DNS	
	1	Layegha Hashemi	Afghanistan	DNS	
	2	Alfiya Khasanova	Russia	DNS	
	2	Laila Kærgaard Laursen	Denmark	DNS	
	2	Marcela Lustigová	Czech Republic	DNS	

=== Final ===
Rank	Name	Nationality	Time	Notes
1st place, gold medalist(s)	Marina Munćan	Serbia	4:15.53	
2nd place, silver medalist(s)	Kaila McKnight	Australia	4:16.10	
3rd place, bronze medalist(s)	Elena García	Spain	4:17.02	
4	Anastasia Fesenko	Russia	4:17.56	
5	Julia Howard	Canada	4:17.85	
6	Charlotte Schonbeck	Sweden	4:18.71	
7	Deirdre Byrne	Ireland	4:19.48	
8	Irina Maracheva	Russia	4:20.05	
9	Bridey Delaney	Australia	4:20.62	
10	Hazel Murphy	Ireland	4:20.92	
11	Janet Achola	Uganda	4:21.34	
12	Jeļena Ābele	Latvia	4:22.26	
