= 2012 IAAF World Indoor Championships – Women's 1500 metres =

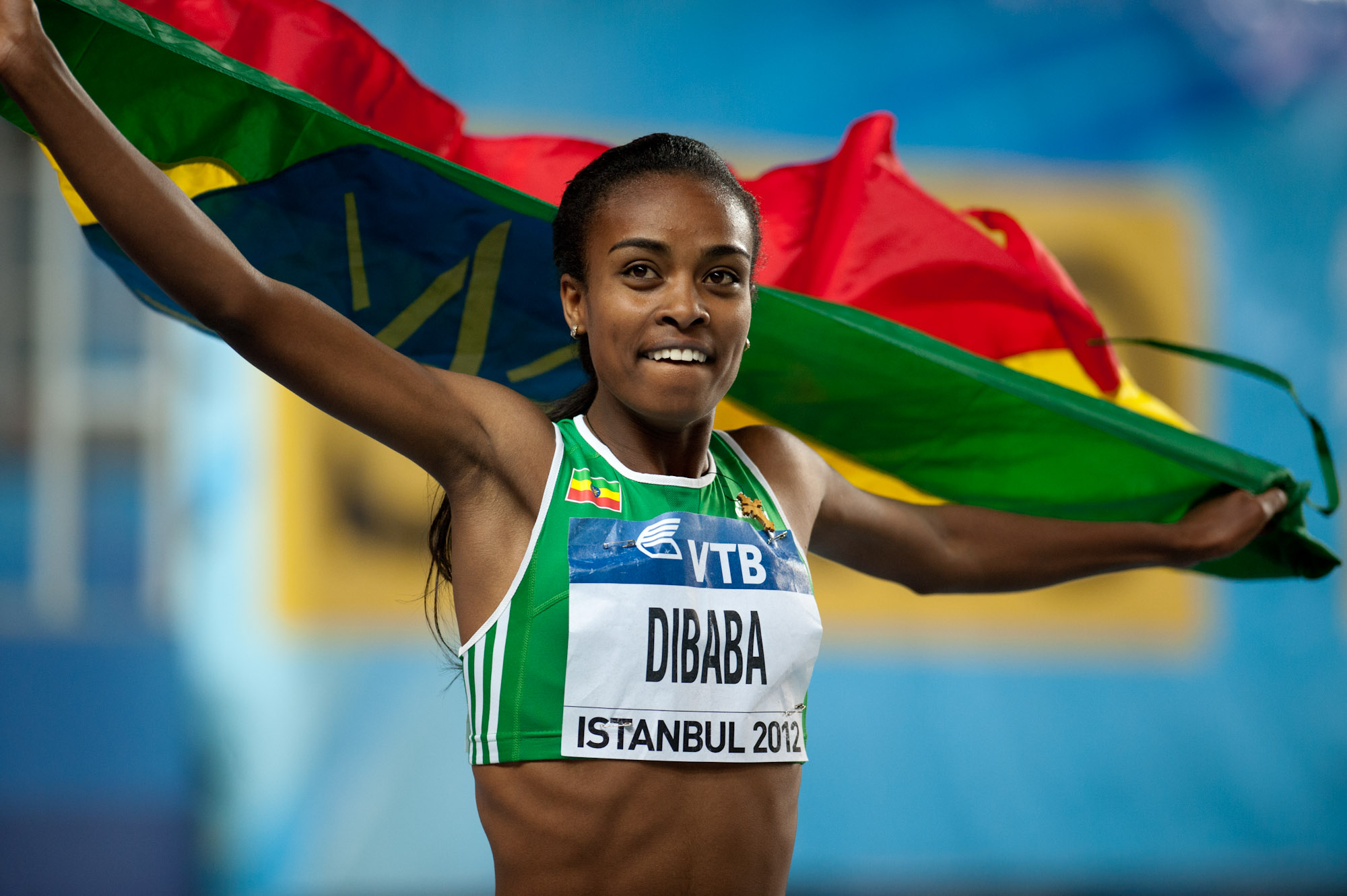
Genzebe Dibaba celebrating her win.

The women's 1500 metres at the 2012 IAAF World Indoor Championships took place March 9 and 10 at the Ataköy Athletics Arena. Four of the fifteen participants were later found out to be doping, including the original bronze medallist, Aslı Çakır Alptekin.

== Medalists ==
Gold	Silver	Bronze
Genzebe Dibaba; Ethiopia	Mariem Alaoui Selsouli; Morocco	Hind Déhiba; France

== Records ==
Standing records prior to the 2012 IAAF World Indoor Championships
World record	Elena Soboleva (RUS)	3:58.28	Moscow, Russia	18 February 2006
Championship record	Gelete Burka (ETH)	3:59.75	Valencia, Spain	9 March 2008
World Leading	Genzebe Dibaba (ETH)	4:00.13	Karlsruhe, Germany	12 February 2012
African record	Gelete Burka (ETH)	3:59.75	Valencia, Spain	9 March 2008
Asian record	Maryam Yusuf Jamal (BHR)	3:59.79	Valencia, Spain	9 March 2008
European record	Elena Soboleva (RUS)	3:58.28	Moscow, Russia	18 February 2006
North and Central American and Caribbean record	Regina Jacobs (USA)	3:59.98	Boston, United States	1 February 2003
Oceanian Record	Sarah Jamieson (AUS)	4:11.08	Boston, United States	7 February 2009
South American record	Letitia Vriesde (SUR)	4:14.05	Budapest, Hungary	12 February 1992

== Qualification standards ==
Indoor	Outdoor
4:14.00 or 4:31.00 (Mile)	4:03.50 or 4:22.00 (Mile)

== Schedule ==
Date	Time	Round
March 9, 2012	18:30	Heats
March 10, 2012	18:00	Final

== Results ==
=== Heats ===
Qualification: First 3 of each heat (Q) plus the 3 fastest qualified (q). 15 athletes from 12 countries participated.

Rank	Heat	Name	Nationality	Time	Notes
1	2	Mariem Alaoui Selsouli	Morocco	4:08.56	Q
2	2	Hind Dehiba	France	4:08.78	Q
3	2	Tizita Bogale	Ethiopia	4:08.91	Q
DQ	2	Elena Arzhakova	Russia	~~4:09.15~~	q, ~~SB~~, Doping
DQ	2	Aslı Çakır Alptekin	Turkey	~~4:09.30~~	q, ~~NR~~, Doping
4	2	Angelika Cichocka	Poland	4:09.50	q
5	1	Genzebe Dibaba	Ethiopia	4:11.17	Q
6	2	Brenda Martinez	United States	4:11.30	
7	1	Isabel Macías	Spain	4:11.53	Q
DQ	1	Natallia Kareiva	Belarus	~~4:11.64~~	Q, Doping
8	1	Siham Hilali	Morocco	4:11.69	
DQ	1	Anzhelika Shevchenko	Ukraine	~~4:12.78~~	Doping
9	1	Luiza Gega	Albania	4:13.45	
10	1	Sara Vaughn	United States	4:17.46	
11	1	Ioana Doaga	Romania	4:17.50	

=== Final ===
9 athletes from 8 countries participated.

Rank	Name	Nationality	Time	Notes
1st place, gold medalist(s)	Genzebe Dibaba	Ethiopia	4:05.78	
2nd place, silver medalist(s)	Mariem Alaoui Selsouli	Morocco	4:07.78	
DQ	Aslı Çakır Alptekin	Turkey	~~4:08.74~~	~~NR~~, Doping
DQ	Natallia Kareiva	Belarus	~~4:10.12~~	Doping
3rd place, bronze medalist(s)	Hind Déhiba	France	4:10.30	
4	Tizita Bogale	Ethiopia	4:10.98	
DQ	Elena Arzhakova	Russia	~~4:13.04~~	Doping
5	Angelika Cichocka	Poland	4:14.57	
6	Isabel Macías	Spain	4:22.40	
