= 2010 World Junior Championships in Athletics – Women's 1500 metres =

The women's 1500 metres event at the 2010 World Junior Championships in Athletics was held in Moncton, New Brunswick, Canada, at Moncton Stadium on 23 and 25 July.

== Medalists ==
| Gold | Tizita Bogale; Ethiopia |
| Silver | Ciara Mageean; Ireland |
| Bronze | Nancy Chepkwemoi; Kenya |

== Results ==
=== Final ===
25 July

| Rank | Name | Nationality | Time | Notes |
|---|---|---|---|---|
| 1st place, gold medalist(s) | Tizita Bogale | Ethiopia | 4:08.06 | |
| 2nd place, silver medalist(s) | Ciara Mageean | Ireland | 4:09.51 | |
| 3rd place, bronze medalist(s) | Nancy Chepkwemoi | Kenya | 4:11.04 | |
| 4 | Jordan Hasay | United States | 4:13.95 | |
| 5 | Ioana Doaga | Romania | 4:14.27 | |
| 6 | Laura Weightman | United Kingdom | 4:14.31 | |
| 7 | Nelly Ngeiywo | Kenya | 4:18.50 | |
| 8 | Amela Terzić | Serbia | 4:19.03 | |
| 9 | Jennifer Wenth | Austria | 4:22.39 | |
| 10 | Genzeb Shumi | Bahrain | 4:23.90 | |
| 11 | Rebekah Greene | New Zealand | 4:27.75 | |
| 12 | Asmerawork Bekele | Ethiopia | 4:30.02 | |

=== Heats ===
23 July

==== Heat 1 ====
| Rank | Name | Nationality | Time | Notes |
|---|---|---|---|---|
| 1 | Tizita Bogale | Ethiopia | 4:12.95 | Q |
| 2 | Ioana Doaga | Romania | 4:12.98 | Q |
| 3 | Nelly Ngeiywo | Kenya | 4:13.00 | Q |
| 4 | Genzeb Shumi | Bahrain | 4:14.05 | q |
| 5 | Rebekah Greene | New Zealand | 4:18.90 | q |
| 6 | Geneviève Lalonde | Canada | 4:19.20 | |
| 7 | Rachel Schneider | United States | 4:20.99 | |
| 8 | Annet Negesa | Uganda | 4:22.14 | |
| 9 | Androniki Drakaki | Greece | 4:25.54 | |
| 10 | Hanane Qallouj | Morocco | 4:25.85 | |
| | Gesa Felicitas Krause | Germany | DNF | |

==== Heat 2 ====
| Rank | Name | Nationality | Time | Notes |
|---|---|---|---|---|
| 1 | Ciara Mageean | Ireland | 4:16.73 | Q |
| 2 | Jordan Hasay | United States | 4:16.74 | Q |
| 3 | Jennifer Wenth | Austria | 4:16.94 | Q |
| 4 | Jessica Parry | Canada | 4:19.08 | |
| 5 | Hannah Newbould | New Zealand | 4:19.71 | |
| 6 | Akane Yabushita | Japan | 4:19.72 | |
| 7 | Zenobie Van Gansbeke | Belgium | 4:21.83 | |
| 8 | Maureen Koster | Netherlands | 4:22.08 | |
| 9 | Anastasía Karakatsani | Greece | 4:23.56 | |
| 10 | Lyudmyla Kyryychuk | Ukraine | 4:31.13 | |
| 11 | Dina Cid | Chile | 4:43.44 | |

==== Heat 3 ====
| Rank | Name | Nationality | Time | Notes |
|---|---|---|---|---|
| 1 | Nancy Chepkwemoi | Kenya | 4:11.42 | Q |
| 2 | Amela Terzić | Serbia | 4:13.46 | Q |
| 3 | Laura Weightman | United Kingdom | 4:17.11 | Q |
| 4 | Asmerawork Bekele | Ethiopia | 4:18.55 | q |
| 5 | Giulia Viola | Italy | 4:19.37 | |
| 6 | Tuğba Karakaya | Turkey | 4:22.07 | |
| 7 | Viktória Gyürkés | Hungary | 4:23.51 | |
| 8 | Ingeborg Løvnes | Norway | 4:24.42 | |
| 9 | Evangelina Thomas | Argentina | 4:30.53 | |
| 10 | Laura Galván | Mexico | 4:31.30 | |
| 11 | Mariyam Farooq | Maldives | 5:16.29 | |
| | Corinna Harrer | Germany | DNF | |

== Participation ==
According to an unofficial count, 34 athletes from 27 countries participated in the event.

- Argentina (1)
- Austria (1)
- Bahrain (1)
- Belgium (1)
- Canada (2)
- Chile (1)
- Ethiopia (2)
- Germany (2)
- Greece (2)
- Hungary (1)
- Ireland (1)
- Italy (1)
- Japan (1)
- Kenya (2)
- Maldives (1)
- Mexico (1)
- Morocco (1)
- Netherlands (1)
- New Zealand (2)
- Norway (1)
- Romania (1)
- Serbia (1)
- Turkey (1)
- Uganda (1)
- Ukraine (1)
- United Kingdom (1)
- United States (2)
