= 2006 World Junior Championships in Athletics – Women's 800 metres =

The women's 800 metres event at the 2006 World Junior Championships in Athletics was held in Beijing, China, at Chaoyang Sports Centre on 15, 16 and 18 August.

== Medalists ==
Gold	Olga Cristea; Moldova
Silver	Winny Chebet; Kenya
Bronze	Rebekah Noble; United States

== Results ==
=== Final ===
18 August

Rank	Name	Nationality	Time	Notes
1st place, gold medalist(s)	Olga Cristea	Moldova	2:04.52	
2nd place, silver medalist(s)	Winny Chebet	Kenya	2:04.59	
3rd place, bronze medalist(s)	Rebekah Noble	United States	2:04.90	
4	Natalya Lupu	Ukraine	2:05.05	
5	Anzhelika Shevchenko	Ukraine	2:05.23	
6	Aleksandra Uvarova	Russia	2:05.43	
7	Aïcha Rezig	Algeria	2:06.22	
8	Elizet Banda	Zambia	2:07.71	

=== Semifinals ===
16 August

==== Semifinal 1 ====
Rank	Name	Nationality	Time	Notes
1	Natalya Lupu	Ukraine	2:06.37	Q
2	Winny Chebet	Kenya	2:06.41	Q
3	Emma Jackson	United Kingdom	2:06.43	
4	Shannon Leinert	United States	2:07.67	
5	Agnieszka Sowinska	Poland	2:08.47	
6	Antonija Zalac	Croatia	2:11.19	
7	Ruriko Kubo	Japan	2:11.47	
8	Boglárka Bozzay	Hungary	2:14.08	

==== Semifinal 2 ====
Rank	Name	Nationality	Time	Notes
1	Anzhelika Shevchenko	Ukraine	2:05.04	Q
2	Aïcha Rezig	Algeria	2:05.45	Q
3	Rebekah Noble	United States	2:05.56	q
4	Ayako Jinnouchi	Japan	2:05.63	
5	Halima Hachlaf	Morocco	2:07.07	
6	Veera Duman	Estonia	2:11.48	
7	Muriel Coneo	Colombia	2:13.15	
8	Machteld Mulder	Netherlands	2:15.17	

==== Semifinal 3 ====
Rank	Name	Nationality	Time	Notes
1	Olga Cristea	Moldova	2:04.76	Q
2	Aleksandra Uvarova	Russia	2:05.02	Q
3	Elizet Banda	Zambia	2:05.57	q
4	Zoe Buckman	Australia	2:05.60	
5	Danielle Christmas	United Kingdom	2:07.26	
6	Annett Horna	Germany	2:07.54	
7	Frida Flodström	Sweden	2:09.34	
8	Flavious Teresa Kwamboka	Kenya	2:12.41	

=== Heats ===
15 August

==== Heat 1 ====
Rank	Name	Nationality	Time	Notes
1	Elizet Banda	Zambia	2:08.60	Q
2	Rebekah Noble	United States	2:08.97	Q
3	Agnieszka Sowinska	Poland	2:08.97	Q
4	Zoe Buckman	Australia	2:09.02	Q
5	Anne Kesselring	Germany	2:10.09	
6	Malika Akkaoui	Morocco	2:10.20	
7	Cristina Guevara	Mexico	2:18.59	

==== Heat 2 ====
Rank	Name	Nationality	Time	Notes
1	Emma Jackson	United Kingdom	2:05.68	Q
2	Halima Hachlaf	Morocco	2:06.85	Q
3	Annett Horna	Germany	2:07.78	Q
4	Flavious Teresa Kwamboka	Kenya	2:08.13	Q
5	Huang Jing	China	2:08.69	
6	Jhuma Khatun	India	2:12.31	
7	Elena Batrinu	Romania	2:13.29	
8	Merve Aydın	Turkey	2:17.16	

==== Heat 3 ====
Rank	Name	Nationality	Time	Notes
1	Anzhelika Shevchenko	Ukraine	2:06.08	Q
2	Winny Chebet	Kenya	2:06.43	Q
3	Aïcha Rezig	Algeria	2:06.92	Q
4	Antonija Zalac	Croatia	2:07.09	Q
5	Shannon Leinert	United States	2:07.24	q
6	Muriel Coneo	Colombia	2:08.05	q
6	Veera Duman	Estonia	2:08.05	q
8	Angela Wagner	South Africa	2:08.51	

==== Heat 4 ====
Rank	Name	Nationality	Time	Notes
1	Aleksandra Uvarova	Russia	2:06.19	Q
2	Ruriko Kubo	Japan	2:06.84	Q
3	Machteld Mulder	Netherlands	2:06.91	Q
4	Frida Flodström	Sweden	2:07.12	Q
5	Boglárka Bozzay	Hungary	2:07.87	q
6	Tong Xiaomei	China	2:09.26	
7	María Panou	Greece	2:12.88	

==== Heat 5 ====
Rank	Name	Nationality	Time	Notes
1	Natalya Lupu	Ukraine	2:07.54	Q
2	Olga Cristea	Moldova	2:07.56	Q
3	Ayako Jinnouchi	Japan	2:07.71	Q
4	Danielle Christmas	United Kingdom	2:08.53	Q
5	Maryna Katovich	Belarus	2:09.30	
6	Irina Zudikhina	Uzbekistan	2:09.65	
7	Cyndie Sabattini	France	2:11.52	

== Participation ==
According to an unofficial count, 37 athletes from 29 countries participated in the event.

- Algeria (1)
- Australia (1)
- Belarus (1)
- China (2)
- Colombia (1)
- Croatia (1)
- Estonia (1)
- France (1)
- Germany (2)
- Greece (1)
- Hungary (1)
- India (1)
- Japan (2)
- Kenya (2)
- Mexico (1)
- Moldova (1)
- Morocco (2)
- Netherlands (1)
- Poland (1)
- Romania (1)
- Russia (1)
- South Africa (1)
- Sweden (1)
- Turkey (1)
- Ukraine (2)
- United Kingdom (2)
- United States (2)
- Uzbekistan (1)
- Zambia (1)
