= Marina Munćan =

Serbian middle-distance runner

Marina Munćan Марина Мунћан
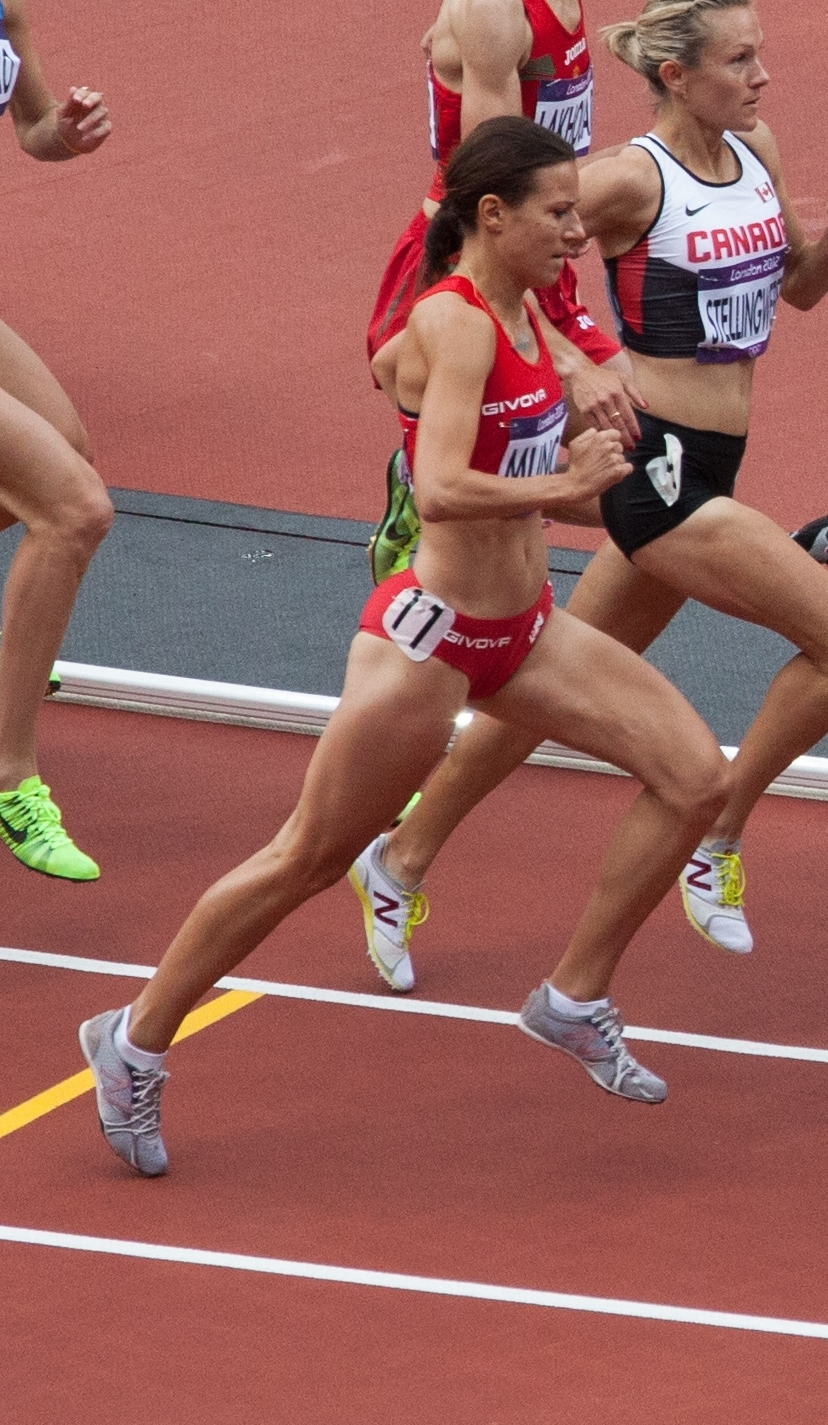
- Munćan at the 2012 Summer Olympics

Personal information
- Nationality: Serbian
- Born: 6 November 1982 (age 43) Pančevo, SR Serbia, SFR Yugoslavia
- Height: 1.64 m (5 ft 5 in)
- Weight: 44 kg (97 lb)

Sport
- Sport: Track
- Events: 800 metres, 1500 metres
- College team: Villanova

Achievements and titles
- Personal bests: 800 metres: 2:02.86; 1500 metres: 4:06.48; Mile: 4:31.52
Medal record
Representing Yugoslavia
European Youth Olympic Festival
| Gold medal – first place | 1999 Esbjerg | 3000m |
Representing Serbia
Universiade
| Gold medal – first place | 2009 Belgrade | 1500m |

Marina Munćan (Serbian Cyrillic: Марина Мунћан; born 6 November 1982) is a Serbian former middle-distance runner who specialised in the 1500 metres. She represented Serbia at the 2012 Summer Olympics. She holds multiple Serbian records. She is now the head cross country and assistant track and field coach for Claremont-Mudd-Scripps, in Claremont, California.

== Running career ==
=== Collegiate ===
Munćan attended Villanova, for which she ran track and cross country. In addition to finishing in first place in various Big East middle-distance track races, Munćan earned 11 Big East Conference track and field championship titles, she earned 9 NCAA Division I All-American awards for NCAA Track championships in 2003, 2004, 2005 and 2006.

=== Post collegiate ===
She represented Serbia at the World Championships in 2007 and 2009 and European Championships in 2010 and 2012. At the 2009 Summer Universiade she won a gold medal in 1500 m with a time 4:15:53 minutes. She ran the women's 1500-m race at the 2012 Summer Olympics, barely missing qualification to the semifinal round recording a time of 4:11.25.

== Major competition record ==
| Year | Competition | Venue | Position | Event | Notes |
Representing Serbia and Montenegro
| 2000 | World Cross Country Championships | Vilamoura, Portugal | 88th | Junior race | 24:06 |
| 2001 | European Junior Championships | Grosseto, Italy | 12th (h) | 1500 m | 4:25.21 |
| 2003 | European U23 Championships | Bydgoszcz, Poland | 8th | 1500 m | 4:15.32 |
| 2005 | Mediterranean Games | Almería, Spain | 9th | 1500 m | 4:15.56 |
Representing Serbia
| 2007 | European Indoor Championships | Birmingham, United Kingdom | 9th | 1500 m | 4:14.60 |
| 2007 | Universiade | Bangkok, Thailand | 5th | 1500 m | 4:12.56 |
| 2007 | World Championships | Osaka, Japan | 7th (sf) | 1500 m | 4:08.02 |
| 2009 | European Indoor Championships | Turin, Italy | 8th | 1500 m | 4:20.01 |
| 2009 | Universiade | Belgrade, Serbia | 1st | 1500 m | 4:14.13 |
| 2009 | World Championships | Berlin, Germany | 34th (h) | 1500 m | 4:15.18 |
| 2010 | European Championships | Barcelona, Spain | 21st (h) | 1500 m | 4:19.32 |
| 2011 | European Indoor Championships | Paris, France | 21st (h) | 1500 m | 4:18.09 |
| 2012 | European Championships | Helsinki, Finland | 10th | 1500 m | 4:15.63 |
| 2012 | Olympic Games | London, United Kingdom | 27th (h) | 1500 m | 4:11.25 |

== Personal bests ==
=== Outdoor ===
| Event | Performance | Date | Location | Notes |
|---|---|---|---|---|
| 800m | 2:02.86 | 26 July 2009 | Brasschaat, Belgium | |
| 1500m | 4:06.48 | 17 July 2012 | Lignano Sabbiadoro, Italy | |
| One mile | 4:31.52 | 20 April 2012 | Walnut, United States | |
| 3000m | 9:17.04 | 31 August 2009 | Zagreb, Croatia | |

=== Indoor ===
| Event | Performance | Date | Location | Notes |
|---|---|---|---|---|
| 800m | 2:05.75 | 11 February 2011 | Boston, United States | NR |
| 1000m | 2:45.40 | 29 January 2005 | State College, United States | NR |
| 1500m | 4:12.23 | 6 March 2009 | Turin, Italy | NR |
| One mile | 4:31.84 | 22 January 2011 | New York City, United States | |
| 3000m | 9:08.44 | 15 December 2004 | Haverford, United States | |
