= Charlene Thomas =

British middle-distance runner (born 1982)

Medal record

Women's athletics

Representing United Kingdom

European Team Championships
Gold medal – first place	2011 Stockholm	1500 m

Charlene Thomas (née Snelgrove, born 6 May 1982) is an English middle-distance runner who competes internationally for Great Britain.

A successful junior athlete nationally, in 2002 she won the 1500 metres at indoor BUSA championships and came second outdoors. As a senior, she began competing on the IAAF Golden League circuit in 2007, coming tenth in the mile run at the Memorial van Damme, where her time of 4:27.95 minutes was the fastest run by a British woman in twelve years. and taking second place over 1500 m at the DN Galan in Stockholm. She placed second in the event at that year's National Championships.

Thomas was fifth over 1500 m at the Olympic Trials in 2008, but went on to be the surprise winner of the 1500 m at the 2009 National Championships ahead of the more favoured Stephanie Twell and Hannah England. This guaranteed her a place for the 2009 World Championships in Athletics, where she made it into the semi-finals of the women's 1500 metres in Berlin. However, she lost a running spike mid-race and did not manage to make the final.

She did not compete for Great Britain in 2010 and that September she decided to leave her job as a Design and Technology supply teacher to focus on running full-time. She returned to the international setup the following year to compete at the 2011 European Team Championships, where she unexpectedly defeated Yekaterina Martynova and Anna Mishchenko to take full points for the team. Her winning time of 4:06.85 minutes was the third fastest of her career.

Charlene regularly wrote about her experiences on the blog of Sportsshoes.com.

== Personal life ==
Charlene is the cousin of professional footballers Mark and Jack Redshaw.
