= Danuta Urbanik =

Polish middle-distance runner

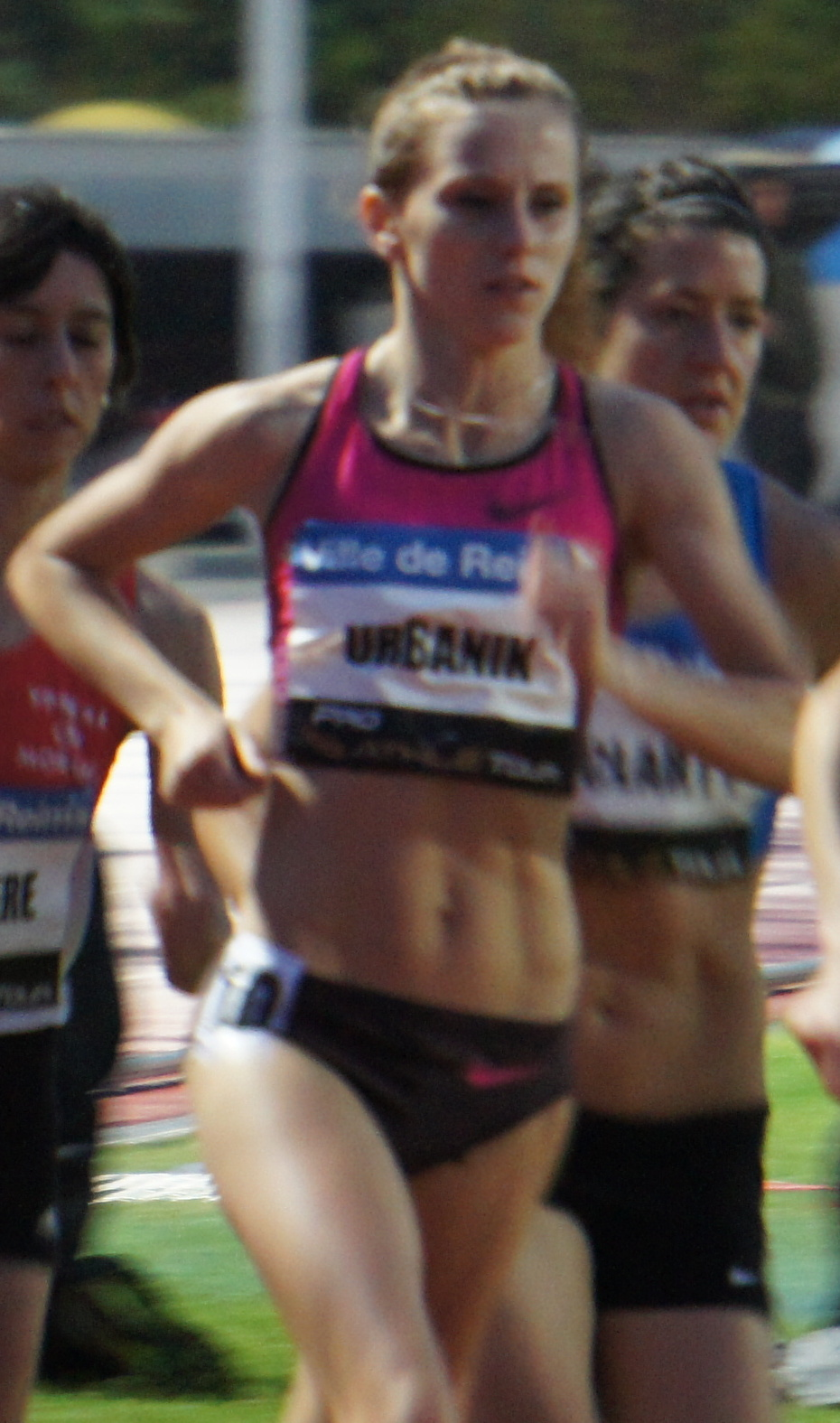
- Urbanik in 2013

Personal information
- Nationality: Polish
- Born: 24 December 1989 (age 36) Stalowa Wola, Poland
- Height: 1.68 m (5 ft 6 in)
- Weight: 51 kg (112 lb)

Sport
- Sport: Track and field
- Event: 1500m
- Club: KKS Victoria Stalowa Wola
- Coached by: Mirosław Barszcz

Danuta Urbanik (born 24 December 1989) is a Polish middle-distance runner. She represented her country at the 2014 and 2016 World Indoor Championships.

== Competition record ==
Year	Competition	Venue	Position	Event	Notes
Representing Poland
2007	European Junior Championships	Hengelo, Netherlands	7th	1500 m	4:26.93
2011	European U23 Championships	Ostrava, Czech Republic	4th	1500 m	4:22.37
2011	Universiade	Shenzhen, China	13th (sf)	800 m	2:05.88
2013	European Indoor Championships	Gothenburg, Sweden	14th (h)	1500 m	4:15.29
2013	Universiade	Kazan, Russia	9th (sf)	800 m	2:02.89
2013	Universiade	Kazan, Russia	5th	4 × 400 m relay	3:45.62
2014	World Indoor Championships	Sopot, Poland	12th (h)	1500 m	4:13.34
2016	World Indoor Championships	Portland, United States	9th	1500 m	4:12.59
2016	European Championships	Amsterdam, Netherlands	15th (h)	1500 m	4:14.86
2016	Olympic Games	Rio de Janeiro, Brazil	22nd (sf)	1500 m	4:11.34

== Personal bests ==
Outdoor

- 800 metres – 2:00.84 (Szczecin 2011)
- 1000 metres – 2:38.71 (Brussels 2013)
- 1500 metres – 4:06.58 (Turku 2016)
- 3000 metres – 9:09.53 (Stalowa Wola 2015)

Indoor

- 800 metres – 2:03.36 (Sopot 2014)
- 1000 metres – 2:41.08 (Spała 2014)
- 1500 metres – 4:09.41 (Portland 2016)
