= Kreiz Breizh Elites Dames =

Women's cycling race in France

Race details
- Date: July
- Region: Brittany
- Discipline: Road
- Type: One-day race
- Organiser: CC du Blavet Bretagne
- Web site: sitekbe.com

History
- First edition: 2018
- Editions: 6 (as of 2024)
- First winner: Dani Christmas (GBR)
- Most recent: Anouska Koster (NED)

Kreiz Breizh Elites Dames (full title Tour de Belle Isle en Terre–Kreiz Breizh Elites Dames) is a women's multiple-stage road cycling race held annually in Brittany. The first edition was held in 2018 as a 1.2 category one-day race on the UCI women's road cycling calendar and since 2019 it is held as a 2.2 category race over two days. Since 2022, it has been a one-day competition again. It has the same organisers as the men's Kreiz Breizh Elites stage race.

== Past winners ==
Year	Country	Rider	Team
2018	Great Britain	Dani Christmas	Bizkaia Durango–Euskadi Murias
2019	Trinidad and Tobago	Teniel Campbell	WCC Team
2020	No race due to COVID-19 pandemic		
2021	Great Britain	Anna Henderson	Team Jumbo–Visma
2022	Denmark	Emma Norsgaard	Movistar Team
2023	Italy	Giorgia Vettorello	Bepink
2024	Netherlands	Anouska Koster	Uno-X Mobility
