= Emma Pallant-Browne =

British triathlete

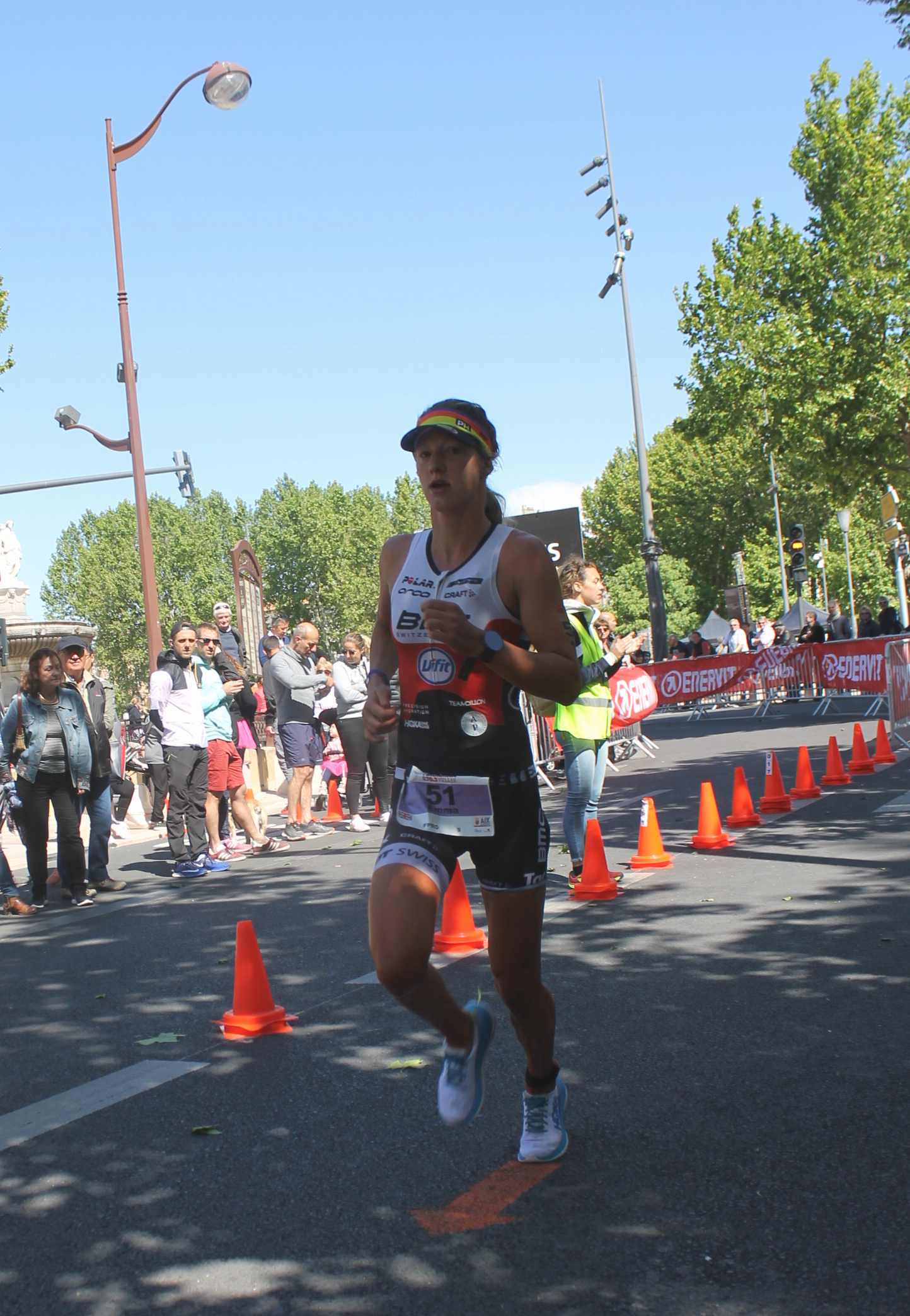

Personal information
- Nationality: Great Britain
- Born: 4 June 1989 (age 37)

Sport
- Sport: Triathlon
Medal record
Women's Triathlon
Representing Great Britain
Ironman 70.3 World Championship
Silver medal – second place	2017 Chattanooga	Ironman 70.3
Bronze medal – third place	2022 St George	Ironman 70.3
Women's Duathlon
World Championships
Gold medal – first place	2015 Adelaide	Individual
Gold medal – first place	2016 Aviles	Individual
Bronze medal – third place	2017 Penticton	Individual
Gold medal – first place	2023 Ibiza	Individual
Women's track and field
European Cross Country Championships
Gold medal – first place	2011 Velenje	U23 Race
Gold medal – first place	2011 Velenje	Individual
World Junior Championships
Bronze medal – third place	2008 Bydgoszcz	1500 m

Emma Pallant-Browne (born 4 June 1989) is a British triathlete and former track and cross country runner.

== Career ==
She was a bronze medalist over 1500 metres at the 2008 World Athletics U20 Championships in Bydgoszcz, Poland. She won gold medals in the individual and team U23 races at the 2011 European Cross Country Championships in Slovenia.

However, after suffering injuries she transitioned to duathlon and triathlon. She won two World Duathlon titles in 2015 and 2016 and a World Aquathlon title in 2017. In 2017, she also won a silver at the Ironman 70.3 World Championship.

She finished third in her first full Ironman distance triathlon in 2018 and qualified for the 2018 Ironman World Championship.

In June 2022, she won the Ironman 70.3 European Championship in Elsinore, Denmark. She won the bronze medal at the 2022 Ironman 70.3 World Championship.

In August 2023, she finished fourth at the 2023 Ironman 70.3 World Championships.

== Personal life ==
She is married to South African triathlete Jaryd Browne.
