= Athletics at the 2013 Summer Universiade – Women's 4 × 400 metres relay =

The women's 4 × 400 metres relay event at the 2013 Summer Universiade was held on 12 July.

== Results ==
Rank	Nation	Athletes	Time	Notes
1st place, gold medalist(s)	Russia	Alena Tamkova, Nadezhda Kotlyarova, Ekaterina Renzhina, Kseniya Ustalova	3:26.61	
2nd place, silver medalist(s)	Canada	Noelle Montcalm, Sarah-Lynn Wells, Helen Crofts, Alicia Brown	3:32.93	
3rd place, bronze medalist(s)	South Africa	Sonja van der Merwe, Arista Nienaber, Justine Palframan, Anneri Ebersohn	3:36.05	
4	Turkey	Derya Yildirim, Özge Akın, Meliz Redif, Sema Apak	3:40.68	
5	Poland	Joanna Linkiewicz, Danuta Urbanik, Katarzyna Broniatowska, Agata Bednarek	3:45.62	
	Uganda		DNS	
