= Jennifer Wenth =

Austrian athlete

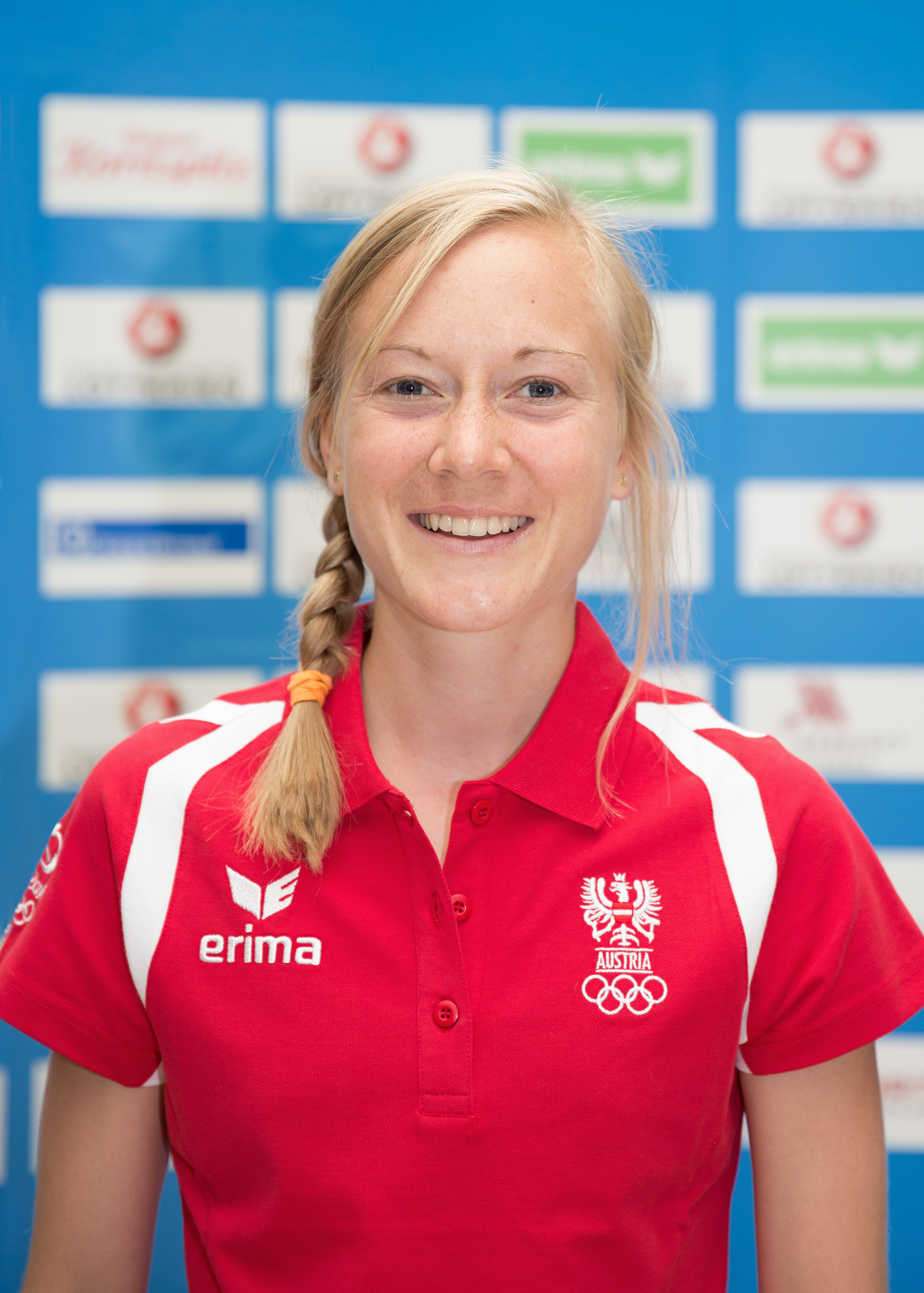
- Jennifer Wenth in 2016

Personal information
- Nationality: Austrian
- Citizenship: Austria
- Born: 24 July 1991 (age 34) Vienna, Austria

Sport
- Country: Austria
- Sport: middle distance and long distance running

Jennifer Wenth (born 24 July 1991 in Vienna) is an Austrian athlete specialising in the middle- and long-distance running events. She represented her country at one outdoor and two indoor European Championships.

She is the current national record holder in the indoor 5000 metres.

== Competition record ==
Year	Competition	Venue	Position	Event	Notes
Representing Austria
2009	European Junior Championships	Novi Sad, Serbia	12th	1500 m	4:31.37
2010	World Junior Championships	Moncton, Canada	9th	1500 m	4:22.39
2010	World Junior Championships	Moncton, Canada	7th	3000 m	9:09.20
2011	European Indoor Championships	Paris, France	20th (h)	1500 m	4:16.74
2011	European U23 Championships	Ostrava, Czech Republic	17th (h)	1500 m	4:21.25
2013	European U23 Championships	Tampere, Finland	13th	5000 m	16:41.46
2014	European Championships	Zürich, Switzerland	11th	5000 m	15:47.61
2015	European Indoor Championships	Prague, Czech Republic	9th	3000 m	8:59.84
2015	Universiade	Gwangju, South Korea	6th	5000 m	16:07.24
2015	World Championships	Beijing, China	15th	5000 m	15:35.46
2016	Olympic Games	Rio de Janeiro, Brazil	16th	5000 m	15:56.11

== Personal bests ==
Outdoor

- 1000 metres – 2:44.89 (Pliezhausen 2010)
- 1500 metres – 4:11.07 (Ghent 2011)
- 3000 metres – 9:09.20 (Moncton 2010)
- 5000 metres – 15:45.50 (Huelva 2014)

Indoor

- 1500 metres – 4:16.25 (Ghent 2011)
- 3000 metres – 8:59.84 (Prague 2015)
- 5000 metres – 15:43.88 (Stockholm 2015)
