= Tuğba Koyuncu =

Turkish middle-distance runner

Personal information
- Nationality: Turkish
- Born: February 16, 1991 (age 35) Kayseri, Turkey
- Height: 169 cm (5 ft 7 in)
- Weight: 55 kg (121 lb)

Sport
- Sport: Middle-distance
- Club: Enkaspor

Achievements and titles
- Personal bests: 800 m 2:01.78 (2011); 1500 m 4:03.41 (2011); 3000 m 9:23.65 (2010)
Medal record
Women's athletics
Representing Turkey
European U23 Championships
Silver medal – second place	2011 Ostrava	1500 m
Islamic Solidarity Games
Bronze medal – third place	2013 Palembang	800 m
Mediterranean Games
Bronze medal – third place	2013 Mersin	800 m
Bronze medal – third place	2013 Mersin	1500 m

Tuğba Koyuncu (née Karakaya; born February 16, 1991, in Kayseri, Turkey) is a Turkish middle-distance runner. She is a student of physical education and sports at the local Erciyes University. Karakaya was a member of the Fenerbahçe Athletics Club, where she was coached by Süleyman Altınok before she transferred to Enkaspor. The 169 cm (5 ft 7 in) tall athlete weighs 55 kg (121 lb).

== Career ==
She was born to Kasım Karakaya, a restaurant employee, and his wife İkbal, who both have seven children. She is the older of two sisters. She began running at the age of 12.

She won a silver medal in 1500 m event at the 2011 European Athletics U23 Championships in Ostrava, Czech Republic.

Koyuncu competed at the 1500 m event at the 2012 Summer Olympics where she failed to reach the semifinals.

At the 2013 Mediterranean Games in Mersin, Turkey, she took two bronze medals, one in the 800 m and the other in the 1500 m event. At the 2013 Islamic Solidarity Games held in Palembang, Indonesia, Koyuncu won also a bronze medal in the 800 m event.

== Achievements ==
Year	Competition	Venue	Position	Event	Notes
Representing Turkey
2010	World Junior Championships	Moncton, New Brunswick, Canada	20th (h)	1500m	4:22.07
2010	World Junior Championships	Moncton, New Brunswick, Canada	14th	3000m	9:23.65
2011	European U23 Championships	Ostrava, Czech Republic	1st	1500 m	4:20.80
2011	World Championships	Daegu, South Korea	8th	1500 m	4:08.14
2013	17th Mediterranean Games	Mersin, Turkey	3rd	800 m	2:01.74
2013	17th Mediterranean Games	Mersin, Turkey	3rd	1500 m	4:06.22
2013	3rd Islamic Solidarity Games	Palembang, Indonesia	3rd	800 m	2:09.17
