= Hannah England =

British middle-distance runner (born 1987)

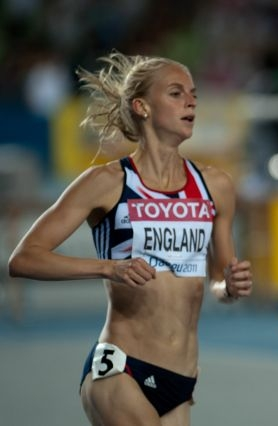
- England at the 2011 World Championships

Personal information
- Nationality: British
- Born: Hannah England; 6 March 1987 (age 39) Oxford, UK
- Height: 1.77 m (5 ft 9 1/2 in)

Sport
- Sport: Women's athletics
- Turned pro: 2008
- Retired: 2020
Medal record
Representing Great Britain
World Championships
Silver medal – second place	2011 Daegu	1500 m

Hannah England (born 6 March 1987) is a British middle-distance running athlete who specialised in the 800 metres, 1500 metres and mile run. At 1500 m, she is the 2011 World Championship silver medallist and finished fourth at the 2013 World Championships. She also competed at the 2012 Olympic Games in London. England is one of only five British women in history (as of 2019) to have run under two minutes for 800 m and nine minutes for 3000 m, the others being Christina Boxer, Kirsty Wade, Jessica Judd and Laura Muir. She announced her retirement from athletics on 14 January 2020.

== Biography ==
Born in Oxford, England, she attended the Cherwell School in Summertown, North Oxford. England joined Oxford City Athletic Club as an under 13, her first major success coming in the UK Athletics Reebok Cross Country Challenge in Birmingham as an Under 15. In 2005 England joined Birmingham University to study Biochemistry. Winning the national junior title in the 1500 m and competing at the World Junior Championships. As part of her degree studies, she spent a year at Florida State University. During her time there, she competed for the university's track team at the NCAA Track and Field Championships, winning the mile run indoors and the 1500 m outdoors. She returned to the United Kingdom and finished third in the 1500 m at the 2008 national championships. However, World Junior Champion Stephanie Twell was selected ahead of her for the 2008 Summer Olympics and England attended the Games as a reserve but did not compete.

The following season she competed in the 1500 m at the 2009 European Athletics Indoor Championships, but did not progress beyond the heats after a below-par performance. She set a personal best of 4:05.87 at the Fanny Blankers-Koen Games in Hengelo, finishing seventh and beating Olympic champion Nancy Lagat. England set an 800 m personal best of 1:59.94 at the 2009 European Team Championships and managed fourth place in both 800 and 1500 metres events, helping the Great Britain team to a third-place finish.

Qualification for the 2009 World Championships in the 1500 metres was going to be hard, as four British athletes had achieved the time required, but only three entrants per event were allowed. As Charlene Thomas surprisingly won the British trials, she was selected by default. Lisa Dobriskey, who had finished 4th at the Beijing Olympics the previous year and was still in good form, was also selected on merit; the last remaining place was between England and Stephanie Twell. As Twell had a faster time that season, as well as higher youth achievement, she was selected over England. Dobriskey went on to win a silver medal at the World Championships.

At the 2009 IAAF World Athletics Final, England qualified for 1500 metres as one of the top twelve athletes of the season. She finished second in the race, behind only Olympic Champion Nancy Jebet Lagat and beating among others reigning World Champion Maryam Yusuf Jamal.

In 2010 England finished a strong second in the 1500m at the European Team Championships in Bergen, Norway and followed it up with a national AAA title, again at 1500m, to secure selection for the European Championships in Barcelona running a startling 56.7 last lap, albeit in a very slow race.

On 1 September 2011 at the IAAF World Athletics Championship, competing in the 1500m final, Hannah produced a stunning final 100 metres, coming from 7th place at the final bend to take the silver medal in a time of 4:05.68.

== Personal ==
She is the daughter of Oxford geophysicist, Professor Philip England and in 2012 she married fellow Great Britain athlete Luke Gunn.

== International competitions ==
Year	Competition	Venue	Position	Event	Notes
2006	World Junior Championships	Beijing, China	11th (heats)	1500 m	4:23.49
2007	European U23 Championships	Debrecen, Hungary	5th	1500m	4:18.70
2009	European Team Championships	Leiria, Portugal	4th	800 m	1:59.94
2009	European Team Championships	Leiria, Portugal	3rd	1500 m	4:09.25
2010	European Championships	Barcelona, Spain	10th	1500 m	4:05.07
2010	Commonwealth Games	New Delhi, India	5th	800 m	2:00.47
2010	Commonwealth Games	New Delhi, India	4th	1500 m	4:06.83
2011	World Championships	Daegu, South Korea	2nd	1500 m	4:05.68
2012	Olympic Games	London, England	19th (semi-final)	1500 m	4:06.35
2013	World Championships	Moscow, Russia	4th	1500 m	4:04.98
2014	Commonwealth Games	Glasgow, Scotland	7th	1500 m	4:11.10
2014	European Championships	Zurich, Switzerland	6th	1500 m	4:07.80
2015	Adidas Grand Prix	New York City, United States	5th	1000m	2:41.04
2017	IAAF World Challenge	Zagreb, Croatia	6th	800m	2:01.23

== National titles ==
- UK Championships 1500 m (2010, 2011, 2013)
- UK Indoor Championships 3000 m (2012)
- NCAA Championships 1500 m (2008)
- NCAA Indoor Championships 1500 m (2008)

== Personal bests ==
Event	Time	Venue	Date
800 metres	1:59.66	Linz, Austria	20 August 2012
1500 metres	4:01.89	Barcelona, Spain	22 July 2011
1500 metres (indoor)	4:07.13	Stockholm, Sweden	22 February 2011
Mile run (indoor)	4:30.29	Ghent, Belgium	8 February 2009
3000 metres (indoor)	8:56.72	Boston, United States	6 February 2010
