= Tereza Čapková =

Czech middle-distance runner

Personal information
- Nationality: Czech Republic
- Born: 24 June 1987 (age 39) Příbram, Czechoslovakia
- Years active: 2005–2016
- Height: 5 ft 4 in (163 cm)
- Weight: 54 kg (119 lb)

Sport
- Sport: Middle-distance
- Club: USK Praha
- Coached by: Jan Pernica

Achievements and titles
- Personal best: 1500 m: 4:08.27 (2012)
Medal record
European Championships
Bronze medal – third place	2012 Helsinki	1500 m

Tereza Čapková (Czech pronunciation: [ˈtɛrɛza ˈtʃapkovaː]; born 24 July 1987, in Příbram) is a Czech track and field athlete who competed at the 2012 Summer Olympics.

She has also competed at the 2011 Summer Universiade and 2012 European Athletics Championships where she won a bronze medal. She finished 7th in the 1500 m at the 2011 World Junior Championships.

== International competitions ==
Year	Competition	Venue	Position	Event	Notes
Representing Czech Republic
2005	European Cross Country Championships	Tilburg, Netherlands	27th	Junior Women	16:14
2006	World Junior Championships	Beijing, China	7th	1500 m	4:16.37
2009	European Team Championships	Leiria, Portugal	11th	1500 m	4:22.33
2009	World Championships	Kaunas, Lithuania	13th (h)	1500 m	4:30.41
2011	European Team Championships	Stockholm, Sweden	5th	1500 m	4:10.74
2011	Summer Universiade	Shenzhen, China	4th	1500 m	4:08.89
2012	European Championships	Helsinki, Finland	3rd	1500 m	4:10.17
2012	Summer Olympics	London, United Kingdom	12th (h)	1500 m	4:12.15
2013	Summer Universiade	Kazan, Russia	10th	1500 m	DNF
2016	European Cross Country Championships	Chia, Italy	56th	Senior Women	27:40
