= Anzhelika Shevchenko =

Ukrainian and Russian runner (born 1987)

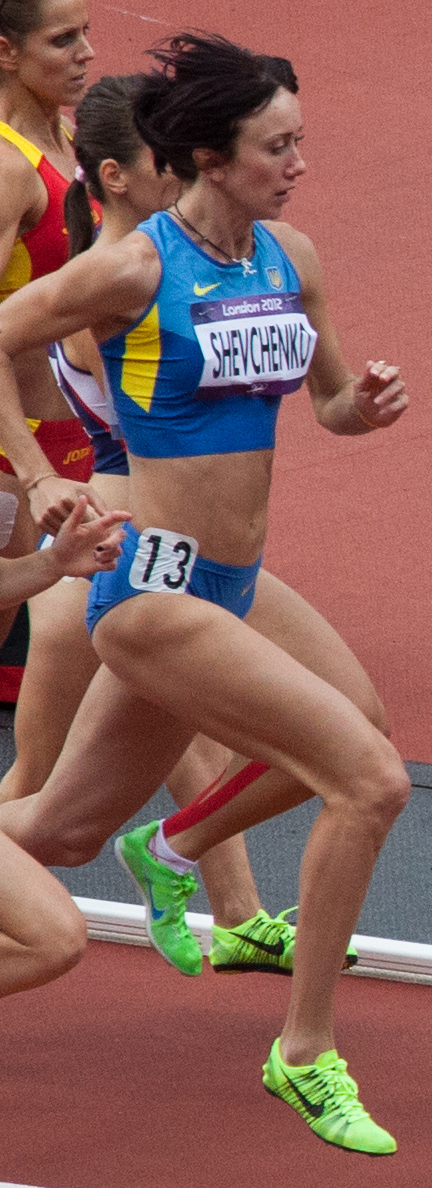
Shevchenko at the 2012 Summer Olympics

Anzhelika Viktorivna Shevchenko (Ukrainian: Анжеліка Вікторівна Шевченко; born 29 October 1987 in Sevastopol) is a Ukrainian (until 2016) and Russian (since 2017) runner who specializes in the middle-distance running events.

== Career ==
She was disqualified for two years due to the doping case since 18 February 2013 till 17 February 2015. All her results since 2 July 2011 were annulled.

In July 2017, it was announced that she is planning to switch her nationality to Russian.

== Achievements ==
Year	Competition	Venue	Position	Event	Notes
Representing Ukraine
2005	European Junior Championships	Kaunas, Lithuania	6th	800 m	2:05.81
2006	World Junior Championships	Beijing, China	5th	800m	2:05.23
2006	World Junior Championships	Beijing, China	7th	4 × 400 m relay	3:36.97
2011	European Indoor Championships	Paris, France	8th	1500 m	4:18.19
2011	Universiade	Shenzhen, China	9th	1500 m	4:11.80
2012	World Indoor Championships	Istanbul, Turkey	12th (h)	1500 m	4:12.78
