= Tizita Bogale =

Ethiopian runner

Tizita Bogale Ashame (born July 13, 1993) is an Ethiopian runner who specializes in the middle-distance events.

== Achievements ==
Year	Competition	Venue	Position	Event	Notes
Representing Ethiopia
2010	World Junior Championships	Moncton, Canada	1st	1500 m	4:08.06
2012	World Indoor Championships	Istanbul, Turkey	4th	1500 m	4:10.98
