= Alexandra Kosinski =

American distance-runner (born 1989)

Alex Kosinski
- Kosinski (left) racing Jordan Hasay in 2007

Personal information
- Nationality: American
- Born: March 29, 1989 (age 37) Santa Cruz, California

Sport
- Sport: Track, Long-distance running
- Event: 5000 meters
- College team: Oregon

Achievements and titles
- Personal best(s): 800 meters: 2:07.45; 1500 meters: 4:15.67; 5000 meters: 15:36.90

Alexandra Kosinski (born March 29, 1989) is an American distance-runner. She broke the U.S. high school girl's national record for the 1600 meters in 2007. She went on to attend and run with University of Oregon in cross country and track.

== Running career ==
=== High school ===
Kosinski attended and ran with Oak Ridge High School from El Dorado Hills, California. She and another Californian high schooler, Jordan Hasay, were two of the fastest high school women in the state and frequently raced each other before they would both go to University of Oregon.

=== Collegiate ===
Kosinski attended University of Oregon with an athletic scholarship. She majored in Sociology and maintained a 3.83 GPA while in college. On January 29, 2011, she set the school's record for the indoor 5000 meter at 15:44.60. Kosinski placed third in 2011 and placed eighth in the women's 5000 meter finals at the 2012 NCAA Division I Outdoor Track and Field Championships.
