= Diana Sujew =

German middle-distance runner

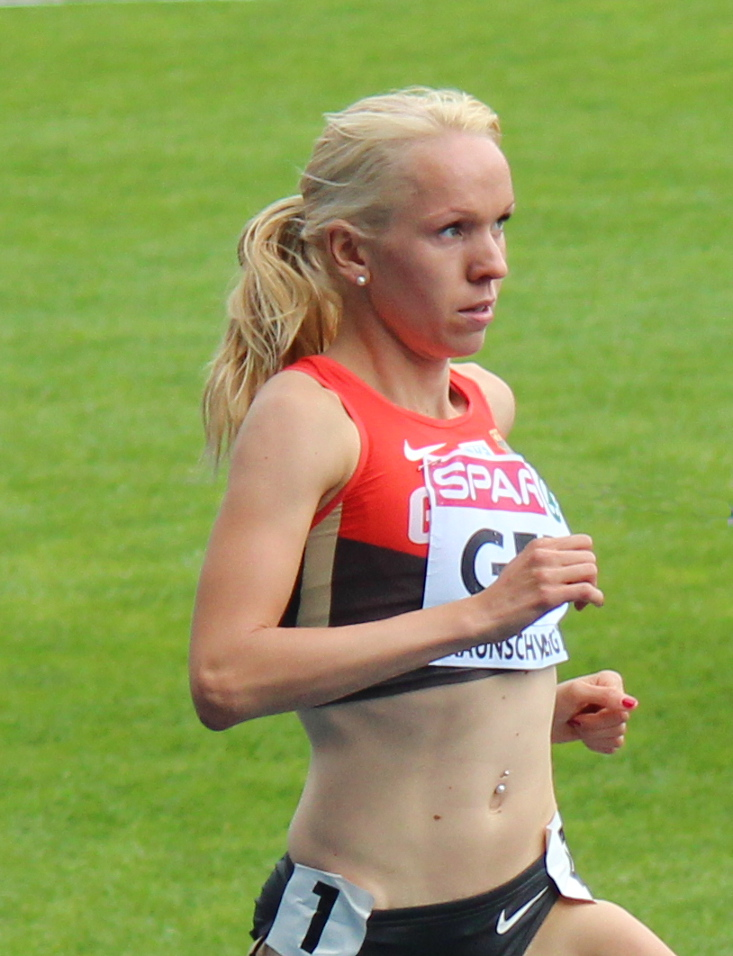
- Diana Sujew in 2014

Personal information
- Nationality: German
- Born: 2 November 1990 (age 35) Riga, Latvian SSR, Soviet Union
- Education: Ansbach University of Applied Sciences
- Height: 1.66 m (5 ft 5 in)
- Weight: 53 kg (117 lb)

Sport
- Country: Germany
- Sport: Track and field
- Event: Middle-distance running
Medal record
Women's athletics
Representing Germany
European Championships
Silver medal – second place	2012 Helsinki	1500 m

Diana Sujew (born 2 November 1990 in Riga, Latvia) is a German athlete who specialises in the middle-distance running. She was the German 1500m champion in 2011. She qualified for 2016 Summer Olympics where she competed in the women's 1500 m. She finished 9th in her semifinal and did not advance to the final.

Her sister Elina Sujew is also a runner.

== Personal bests ==
=== Outdoor ===
Event	Record	Venue	Date
800 metres	2:02.29	Lignano Sabbiadoro	17 July 2012
1000 metres	2:40.03	Pliezhausen	22 May 2011
1500 metres	4:05.62	Heusden-Zolder	13 July 2013
3000 metres	8:47.68	Rieti	8 September 2013
2000 m steeplechase	6:36.25	Ostrava	14 July 2007
3000 m steeplechase	10:30.04	Regensburg	8 June 2008

=== Indoor ===
Event	Record	Venue	Date
1500 metres	4:07.72	Potsdam	22 January 2012
3000 metres	9:02.15	Boston	14 February 2016
