= Anna Mishchenko =

Ukrainian middle-distance runner (born 1983)

Medal record

Women's athletics

Representing Ukraine

European Athletics Championships
Disqualified	2012 Helsinki	1500 m

European Team Championships
Gold medal – first place	2010 Bergen	1500 m
Silver medal – second place	2011 Stockholm	1500 m

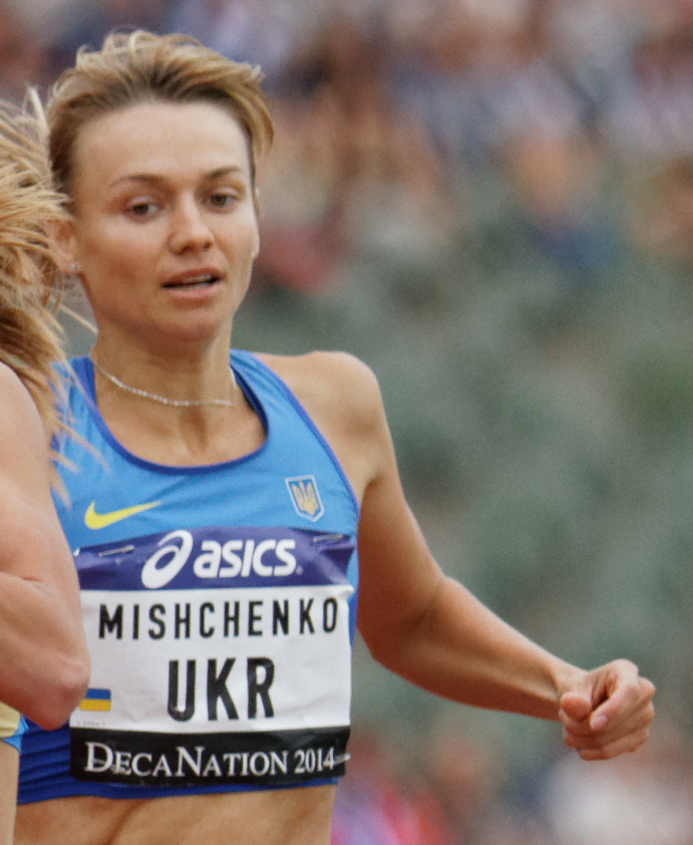
Anna Mishchenko

Anna Valeriïvna Mishchenko (Ukrainian: Анна Валеріївна Міщенко; born 25 August 1983 in Sumy), is a Ukrainian middle-distance runner who specializes in the 1500 metres.

== Career ==
She won the 2006 Ukrainian national championships in the event. In 2008, she took sixth place in the European Athletics Indoor Cup in Moscow and represented Ukraine at the 2008 Summer Olympics. She reached the final of the 1500 m competition, finishing in ninth place with a personal best of 4:05.13.

She first won the bronze medal in the 1500 metres on the 2012 European Athletics Championships in Helsinki, Finland, subsequently upgraded to silver following the disqualification of winner Aslı Çakır Alptekin for doping offences.

On 25 February 2016, the IAAF announced, that she had been banned from competition for two years until 17 August 2017, and all her results since June 28, 2012 will be voided. This resulted from irregularities in her biological passport.

== Personal bests ==
Event	Time	Venue	Date
800 metres	2:00.92	Yalta, Ukraine	28 May 2012
1000 metres	2:39.00	Zagreb, Croatia	9 September 2008
1500 metres	4:01.16	Paris, France	6 July 2012
3000 metres (indoor)	9:11.09	Sumy, Ukraine	17 February 2011

- All information taken from IAAF profile.
