= Elena Arzhakova =

Russian runner (born 1989)

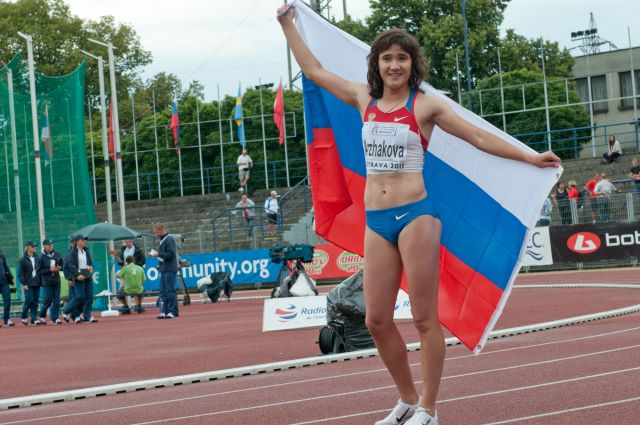
- Arzhakova in 2011

Personal information
- Born: 8 September 1989 (age 36) Barnaul, Russian SFSR, Soviet Union
Medal record
Representing Russia
Women's athletics
European Championships
Disqualified	2012 Helsinki	800 m
European Indoor Championships
Gold medal – first place	2011 Paris	1500 m

Elena Vladimirovna Arzhakova (Russian: Елена Владимировна Аржакова; born 8 September 1989) is a Russian runner who specializes in the middle distance events.

The 2011 European Indoor champion at 1500m, Arzhakova was suspended from athletics in 2013 following a failed doping control, after an abnormality was found in her biological passport. Her results from July 2011 were expunged, as a result of which she was stripped of her further European outdoor and European under-23 titles. Her suspension ended on 29 January 2015.

== Achievements ==
Year	Competition	Venue	Position	Event	Notes
Representing Russia
2006	World Junior Championships	Beijing, China	15th (h)	3000m steeplechase	10:35.06
2011	European Indoor Championships	Paris, France	1st	1500 m	4:13.78
2011	European U23 Championships	Ostrava, Czech Republic	DQ	800 m	NA
2011	Universiade	Shenzhen, China	DQ	1500 m	NA
2012	World Indoor Championships	Istanbul, Turkey	DQ	1500 m	NA
2012	European Championships	Helsinki, Finland	DQ	800 m	NA
2012	Olympic Games	London, United Kingdom	DQ	800 m	NA
