= 2000 IAAF World Cross Country Championships – Women's short race =

Women's short race at the 2000 IAAF World Cross Country Championships
- Organisers: IAAF
- Edition: 28th
- Date: March 19
- Host city: Vilamoura, Algarve, Portugal
- Venue: Sporting Complex of Vilamoura
- Events: 6
- Distances: 4.18 km – Women's short
- Participation: 121 athletes from 33 nations

The Women's short race at the 2000 IAAF World Cross Country Championships was held at the Sporting Complex in Vilamoura, Portugal, on March 19, 2000. Reports of the event were given in The New York Times, in the Herald, and for the IAAF.

Complete results for individuals, for teams, medallists, and the results of British athletes who took part were published.

== Race results ==
=== Women's short race (4.18 km) ===
==== Individual ====
Rank	Athlete	Country	Time
1st place, gold medalist(s)	Kutre Dulecha	Ethiopia	13:00
2nd place, silver medalist(s)	Zahra Ouaziz	Morocco	13:00
3rd place, bronze medalist(s)	Margaret Ngotho	Kenya	13:00
4	Paula Radcliffe	United Kingdom	13:01
5	Fatima Yvelain	France	13:06
6	Yimenashu Taye	Ethiopia	13:07
7	Carla Sacramento	Portugal	13:12
8	Sally Barsosio	Kenya	13:16
9	Zhor El Kamch	Morocco	13:17
10	Fernanda Ribeiro	Portugal	13:17
11	Yamna Belkacem	France	13:21
12	Rose Cheruiyot	Kenya	13:22
13	Helena Sampaio	Portugal	13:22
14	Marta Domínguez	Spain	13:23
15	Sonia O'Sullivan	Ireland	13:23
16	Marina Bastos	Portugal	13:27
17	Getenesh Urge	Ethiopia	13:30
18	Blandine Bitzner-Ducret	France	13:31
19	Irina Mikitenko	Germany	13:31
20	Collette Liss	United States	13:32
21	Iulia Olteanu	Romania	13:32
22	Constantina Diţă	Romania	13:32
23	Rakiya Maraoui	France	13:33
24	Restituta Joseph	Tanzania	13:34
25	Galina Bogomolova	Russia	13:34
26	Samukeliso Moyo	Zimbabwe	13:35
27	Asmae Leghzaoui	Morocco	13:35
28	Rosemary Ryan	Ireland	13:36
29	Inês Monteiro	Portugal	13:36
30	Laurence Duquénoy	France	13:36
31	Genet Gebregiorgis	Ethiopia	13:37
32	Kristina da Fonseca-Wollheim	Germany	13:37
33	Denisa Costescu	Romania	13:38
34	Helen Pattinson	United Kingdom	13:38
35	Luminita Zaituc	Germany	13:38
36	Jane Ekimat	Kenya	13:39
37	Zenebech Tadese	Ethiopia	13:39
38	Lulit Legesse	Ethiopia	13:40
39	Hayley Tullett	United Kingdom	13:40
40	Gunhild Haugen	Norway	13:41
41	Leah Pells	Canada	13:44
42	Ronel Thomas	South Africa	13:44
43	Seloua Ouaziz	Morocco	13:44
44	Jeruto Kiptum	Kenya	13:45
45	Anália Rosa	Portugal	13:47
46	Elena Fidatof	Romania	13:47
47	Bouchra Chaâbi	Morocco	13:47
48	Lene Hove	Norway	13:48
49	Stine Larsen	Norway	13:48
50	Mizuho Nasukawa	Japan	13:49
51	Bente Landøy	Norway	13:49
52	Fabiane Cristine da Silva	Brazil	13:49
53	Amy Rudolph	United States	13:49
54	Fatima Hajjami	France	13:50
55	Tausi Juma	Tanzania	13:50
56	Sarah Dillabaugh	Canada	13:51
57	Miho Kakehata	Japan	13:51
58	Almita Colakoglu	Turkey	13:52
59	Mizuki Noguchi	Japan	13:52
60	Maria Luisa Lárraga	Spain	13:53
61	Angela Newport	United Kingdom	13:54
62	Cristina Grosu	Romania	13:54
63	Melanie Kraus	Germany	13:55
64	Karen Harvey	Canada	13:55
65	Heather DeGeest	Canada	13:55
66	Cristina Casandra	Romania	13:56
67	Anne Keenan-Buckley	Ireland	13:56
68	Justyna Bąk	Poland	13:56
69	Anne Cross	Australia	13:58
70	Amaia Piedra	Spain	13:58
71	Tarath Tsatsa	Zimbabwe	13:59
72	Suzanne Ritter	Germany	14:05
73	Cristina Petite	Spain	14:06
74	Sarah Dupré	Canada	14:08
75	Jane Makombe	Zimbabwe	14:08
76	Lucy Wright	United Kingdom	14:09
77	Tezeta Sürekli	Turkey	14:10
78	Prisca Ngetich	Kenya	14:11
79	Bertha Sánchez	Colombia	14:12
80	Larissa Kleinmann	Germany	14:13
81	Meritxell Calduch	Spain	14:14
82	Mary Jayne Harrelson	United States	14:16
83	Margareth Iro	Tanzania	14:18
84	Nathalie Côté	Canada	14:19
85	Taeko Matsubayashi	Japan	14:20
86	Susanne Wigene	Norway	14:21
87	Grethe Koens	Netherlands	14:24
88	Vanessa Veiga	Spain	14:25
89	Jenelle Deatherage	United States	14:27
90	Elvan Can	Turkey	14:30
91	Hawa Hamis Hussein	Tanzania	14:33
92	Siphuluwazi Sibindi	Zimbabwe	14:34
93	Yelena Tolstygina	Belarus	14:34
94	Caroline Walsh	United Kingdom	14:34
95	Sandra Baumann	Austria	14:35
96	Sviatlana Klimkovich	Belarus	14:36
97	Carmen Troncoso	United States	14:38
98	Selma dos Reis	Brazil	14:38
99	Mundan Anickal Molly	India	14:39
100	Anita Weyermann	Switzerland	14:41
101	Ouafa Frekech	Morocco	14:44
102	Veslemøy Hausken	Norway	14:44
103	Ana Ferreira	Brazil	14:56
104	Anna Kotenkova	Belarus	15:00
105	Rukia Mkanda	Tanzania	15:01
106	Sibel Özyurt	Turkey	15:02
107	Chris Udovich	United States	15:12
108	Elizabeth de Souza	Brazil	15:13
109	Kunnam Parakkal Suma	India	15:22
110	Natalya Alekseyeva	Belarus	15:26
111	Madhuri Gurnule	India	15:28
112	Irina Matrosova	Uzbekistan	15:30
113	Mukti Roy	India	15:49
114	Zamira Amirova	Uzbekistan	16:05
115	Diala El-Chabi	Lebanon	16:57
116	Alena Petrova	Turkmenistan	17:24
117	Natalya Kobina	Uzbekistan	17:45
118	Sonia Lopes	Cape Verde	18:33
119	Mirvette Hamze	Lebanon	18:35
120	Olesy Jovnir	Turkmenistan	19:38
—	Guylsara Dadabayeva	Tajikistan	DNF
—	Carmen Arrúa	Argentina	DNS
—	Diane Nukuri	Burundi	DNS
—	Florence Djepé	Cameroon	DNS
—	Annemari Sandell	Finland	DNS
—	Dina Cruz	Guatemala	DNS
—	Elsa Monterroso	Guatemala	DNS
—	Breeda Dennehy-Willis	Ireland	DNS
—	Maria McCambridge	Ireland	DNS
—	Valerie Vaughan	Ireland	DNS
—	Olivera Jevtić	FR Yugoslavia	DNS

==== Teams ====
Rank	Team	Points
1st place, gold medalist(s)	Portugal: Carla Sacramento / 7; Fernanda Ribeiro / 10; Helena Sampaio / 13; Marina Bastos / 16; (Inês Monteiro) / (29); (Anália Rosa) / (45)	46
2nd place, silver medalist(s)	Ethiopia: Kutre Dulecha / 1; Yimenashu Taye / 6; Getenesh Urge / 17; Genet Gebregiorgis / 31; (Zenebech Tadese) / (37); (Lulit Legesse) / (38)	55
3rd place, bronze medalist(s)	France: Fatima Yvelain / 5; Yamna Belkacem / 11; Blandine Bitzner-Ducret / 18; Rakiya Maraoui / 23; (Laurence Duquénoy) / (30); (Fatima Hajjami) / (54)	57
4	Kenya: Margaret Ngotho / 3; Sally Barsosio / 8; Rose Cheruiyot / 12; Jane Ekimat / 36; (Jeruto Kiptum) / (44); (Prisca Ngetich) / (78)	59
5	Morocco: Zahra Ouaziz / 2; Zhor El Kamch / 9; Asmae Leghzaoui / 27; Seloua Ouaziz / 43; (Bouchra Chaâbi) / (47); (Ouafa Frekech) / (101)	81
6	Romania: Iulia Olteanu / 21; Constantina Diţă / 22; Denisa Costescu / 33; Elena Fidatof / 46; (Cristina Grosu) / (62); (Cristina Casandra) / (66)	122
7	United Kingdom: Paula Radcliffe / 4; Helen Pattinson / 34; Hayley Tullett / 39; Angela Newport / 61; (Lucy Wright) / (76); (Caroline Walsh) / (94)	138
8	Germany: Irina Mikitenko / 19; Kristina da Fonseca-Wollheim / 32; Luminita Zaituc / 35; Melanie Kraus / 63; (Suzanne Ritter) / (72); (Larissa Kleinmann) / (80)	149
9	Norway: Gunhild Haugen / 40; Lene Hove / 48; Stine Larsen / 49; Bente Landøy / 51; (Susanne Wigene) / (86); (Veslemøy Hausken) / (102)	188
10	Spain: Marta Domínguez / 14; Maria Luisa Lárraga / 60; Amaia Piedra / 70; Cristina Petite / 73; (Meritxell Calduch) / (81); (Vanessa Veiga) / (88)	217
11	Canada: Leah Pells / 41; Sarah Dillabaugh / 56; Karen Harvey / 64; Heather DeGeest / 65; (Sarah Dupré) / (74); (Nathalie Côté) / (84)	226
12	United States: Collette Liss / 20; Amy Rudolph / 53; Mary Jayne Harrelson / 82; Jenelle Deatherage / 89; (Carmen Troncoso) / (97); (Chris Udovich) / (107)	244
13	Japan: Mizuho Nasukawa / 50; Miho Kakehata / 57; Mizuki Noguchi / 59; Taeko Matsubayashi / 85	251
14	Tanzania: Restituta Joseph / 24; Tausi Juma / 55; Margareth Iro / 83; Hawa Hamis Hussein / 91; (Rukia Mkanda) / (105)	253
15	Zimbabwe: Samukeliso Moyo / 26; Tarath Tsatsa / 71; Jane Makombe / 75; Siphuluwazi Sibindi / 92	264
16	Turkey: Almita Colakoglu / 58; Tezeta Sürekli / 77; Elvan Can / 90; Sibel Özyurt / 106	331
17	Brazil: Fabiane Cristine da Silva / 52; Selma dos Reis / 98; Ana Ferreira / 103; Elizabeth de Souza / 108	361
18	Belarus: Yelena Tolstygina / 93; Svetlana Klimkovich / 96; Anna Kotenkova / 104; Natalya Alekseyeva / 110	403
19	India: Mundan Anickal Molly / 99; Kunnam Parakkal Suma / 109; Madhuri Gurnule / 111; Mukti Roy / 113	432

- Note: Athletes in parentheses did not score for the team result

== Participation ==
An unofficial count yields the participation of 121 athletes from 33 countries in the Women's short race. The announced athletes from Argentina, Burundi, Cameroon, Finland, Guatemala, and FR Yugoslavia did not show.

- Australia (1)
- Austria (1)
- Belarus (4)
- Brazil (4)
- Canada (6)
- Cape Verde (1)
- Colombia (1)
- Ethiopia (6)
- France (6)
- Germany (6)
- India (4)
- Ireland (3)
- Japan (4)
- Kenya (6)
- Lebanon (2)
- Morocco (6)
- Netherlands (1)
- Norway (6)
- Poland (1)
- Portugal (6)
- Romania (6)
- Russia (1)
- South Africa (1)
- Spain (6)
- Switzerland (1)
- Tajikistan (1)
- Tanzania (5)
- Turkey (4)
- Turkmenistan (2)
- United Kingdom (6)
- United States (6)
- Uzbekistan (3)
- Zimbabwe (4)

== See also ==
- 2000 IAAF World Cross Country Championships – Senior men's race
- 2000 IAAF World Cross Country Championships – Men's short race
- 2000 IAAF World Cross Country Championships – Junior men's race
- 2000 IAAF World Cross Country Championships – Senior women's race
- 2000 IAAF World Cross Country Championships – Junior women's race
