= 1999 World Championships in Athletics – Women's 5000 metres =

These are the official results of the Women's 5000 metres event at the 1999 IAAF World Championships in Seville, Spain. There were a total number of 44 participating athletes, with two qualifying heats and the final held on Friday 27 August 1999 at 21:15h.

== Final ==
RANK	FINAL	TIME
	Gabriela Szabo (ROM)	14:41.82 (CR)
	Zahra Ouaziz (MAR)	14:43.15
	Ayelech Worku (ETH)	14:44.22
4.	Irina Mikitenko (GER)	14:50.17
5.	Yelena-Ebru Kopytova-Kavaklıoğlu (TUR)	14:51.69
6.	Julia Vaquero (ESP)	14:56.00
7.	Mariya Pantyukhova (RUS)	14:58.60
8.	Yamna Oubouhou-Belkacem (FRA)	15:03.47
9.	Marta Domínguez (ESP)	15:16.93
10.	Megumi Tanaka (JPN)	15:17.92
11.	Cheri Goddard-Kenah (USA)	15:20.12
12.	Susanne Pumper (AUT)	15:24.38
13.	Getenesh Urge (ETH)	15:29.60
14.	Katalin Szentgyörgyi (HUN)	15:37.00
15.	Michiko Shimizu (JPN)	15:46.28

== Heats ==
- Held on Tuesday 24 August 1999

RANK	HEAT 1	TIME
1.	Gabriela Szabo (ROM)	15:32.50
2.	Irina Mikitenko (GER)	15:32.55
3.	Mariya Pantyukhova (RUS)	15:33.98
4.	Marta Domínguez (ESP)	15:34.24
5.	Megumi Tanaka (JPN)	15:34.51
6.	Adriana Fernández (MEX)	15:37.79
7.	Werknesh Kidane (ETH)	15:38.12
8.	Annemari Sandell (FIN)	15:41.23
9.	Natalie Harvey (AUS)	15:41.55
10.	Sunita Rani (IND)	15:41.81
11.	Marina Bastos (POR)	15:48.51
12.	Amaia Piedra (ESP)	15:50.93
13.	Samukeliso Moyo (ZIM)	15:50.97
14.	Klara Kashapova (RUS)	15:52.06
15.	Khrysostomía Iakóvou (GRE)	15:59.76
16.	Zhor El Kamch (MAR)	16:06.20
17.	Fatima Maama-Yvelain (FRA)	16:09.85
18.	Amy Rudolph (USA)	16:24.31
19.	Nebiat Habtemariam (ERI)	18:02.28
	Jolanta Alendi (PLE)	DNF
	Kathy Butler (CAN)	DNF
	Asmae Laghzaoui (MAR)	DNS

RANK	HEAT 2	TIME
1.	Yelena-Ebru Kopytova-Kavaklıoğlu (TUR)	15:17.90
2.	Zahra Ouaziz (MAR)	15:20.04
3.	Ayelech Worku (ETH)	15:20.17
4.	Michiko Shimizu (JPN)	15:24.85
5.	Julia Vaquero (ESP)	15:24.86
6.	Susanne Pumper (AUT)	15:25.48
7.	Cheri Goddard-Kenah (USA)	15:25.54
8.	Yamna Oubouhou-Belkacem (FRA)	15:25.85
9.	Getenesh Urge (ETH)	15:27.59
10.	Katalin Szentgyörgyi (HUN)	15:27.61
11.	Helena Javornik (SLO)	15:28.41
12.	Ann Wamuchi (KEN)	15:29.01
13.	Wang Chunmei (CHN)	15:45.80
14.	Yoshiko Fujinaga (JPN)	15:51.52
15.	Olga Yegorova (RUS)	15:53.63
16.	Nora Leticia Rocha (MEX)	16:10.48
17.	Elva Dryer (USA)	16:15.70
18.	Kate Anderson (AUS)	16:34.68
19.	Giselle Camilleri (MLT)	17:18.31
20.	Sukhbaatar Erdenetuya (MGL)	18:47.34
21.	Esperanza Obono Ela (GEQ)	19:20.44
	Agnes Chikwakwa (MAW)	DNS
