= 1995 World Championships in Athletics – Women's 5000 metres =

These are the official results of the Women's 5,000 metres event at the 1995 World Championships in Gothenburg, Sweden. It was the first time at the World Championships that women competed over the 5000 metres distance instead of 3000 metres. There were a total number of 51 participating athletes, with three qualifying heats and the final held on Saturday 1995-08-12.

== Medalists ==
Gold	Silver	Bronze
Sonia O'Sullivan; Ireland	Fernanda Ribeiro; Portugal	Zahra Ouaziz; Morocco

== Results ==
=== Heats ===
- Held on Thursday 1995-08-10

First 4 of each Heat (Q) and the next 3 fastest (q) qualified for the final.

Rank	Heat	Name	Nationality	Time	Notes
1	2	Sonia O'Sullivan	Ireland	15:13.88	Q
2	2	Gabriela Szabo	Romania	15:14.65	Q
3	2	Mariya Pantyukhova	Russia	15:14.70	Q
4	2	Paula Radcliffe	Great Britain	15:14.77	Q
5	2	Sara Wedlund	Sweden	15:15.67	q
6	2	Sally Barsosio	Kenya	15:18.41	q
7	2	Michiko Shimizu	Japan	15:18.97	q
8	2	Silvia Sommaggio	Italy	15:20.89	
9	3	Rose Cheruiyot	Kenya	15:21.36	Q
10	3	Zahra Ouaziz	Morocco	15:22.02	Q
11	3	Fernanda Ribeiro	Portugal	15:22.04	Q
12	2	Ana Dias	Portugal	15:29.32	
13	3	Gwen Griffiths	South Africa	15:32.22	Q
14	2	Anne-Marie Danneels	Belgium	15:33.70	
15	2	Chiemi Takahashi	Japan	15:35.13	
16	1	Elena Fidatov	Romania	15:36.39	Q
17	1	Olga Churbanova	Russia	15:37.23	Q
18	3	Carolyn Schuwalow	Australia	15:37.62	
19	1	Gina Procaccio	United States	15:37.66	Q
20	1	Florence Barsosio	Kenya	15:38.22	Q
21	1	Paivi Tikkanen	Finland	15:38.25	
22	3	Gitte Karlshoj	Denmark	15:39.12	
23	1	Atsumi Yashima	Japan	15:40.02	
24	1	Rosario Murcia	France	15:41.73	
25	3	Luchia Yishak	Ethiopia	15:42.37	
26	1	Nina Christiansen	Denmark	15:44.66	
27	1	Brynhild Synstnes	Norway	15:46.17	
28	1	Adriana Fernández	Mexico	15:46.89	
29	3	Laura Mykytok	United States	15:48.95	
30	1	Milka Mikhaylova	Bulgaria	15:49.31	
31	1	Tamara Koba	Ukraine	15:53.67	
32	2	Serap Aktaş	Turkey	15:53.76	NR
33	2	Libbie Johnson-Hickman	United States	15:54.97	
34	3	Andrea Karhoff	Germany	16:02.26	
35	1	Martha Ernstsdottir	Iceland	16:05.33	
36	2	Anne Cross	Australia	16:09.32	
37	3	Ursula Jeitziner	Switzerland	16:12.57	
38	1	Marina Bastos	Portugal	16:16.78	
39	3	Sinead Delahunty	Ireland	16:18.81	
40	3	Marie-Pierre Duros	France	16:48.66	
41	3	Mirsada Buric-Adam	Bosnia and Herzegovina	17:07.44	
	1	Alison Wyeth	Great Britain	DNF	
	2	Monika Schafer	Germany	DNF	
	2	Dong Zhaoxia	China	DNF	
	2	Hilde Stavik	Norway	DNF	
	3	Viktoriya Nenasheva	Russia	DNF	
	3	Gunhild Halle	Norway	DNF	
	1	Derartu Tulu	Ethiopia	DNS	
	1	Elana Meyer	South Africa	DNS	
	2	Gete Wami	Ethiopia	DNS	
	2	Marleen Renders	Belgium	DNS	

=== Final ===
Rank	Name	Nationality	Time	Notes
1st place, gold medalist(s)	Sonia O'Sullivan	Ireland	14:46.47	CR
2nd place, silver medalist(s)	Fernanda Ribeiro	Portugal	14:48.54	
3rd place, bronze medalist(s)	Zahra Ouaziz	Morocco	14:53.77	NR
4	Gabriela Szabo	Romania	14:56.57	NR
5	Paula Radcliffe	Great Britain	14:57.02	
6	Mariya Pantyukhova	Russia	15:01.23	PB
7	Rose Cheruiyot	Kenya	15:02.45	WJR
8	Gwen Griffiths	South Africa	15:08.05	PB
9	Sara Wedlund	Sweden	15:08.36	
10	Elena Fidatov	Romania	15:12.58	
11	Sally Barsosio	Kenya	15:39.57	
12	Michiko Shimizu	Japan	15:45.30	
13	Florence Barsosio	Kenya	15:56.96	
	Gina Procaccio	United States	DNF	
	Olga Churbanova	Russia	DNF	

== See also ==
- 1992 Women's Olympic 3,000 metres (Barcelona)
- 1993 Women's World Championships 3,000 metres (Stuttgart)
- 1994 Women's European Championships 3,000 metres (Helsinki)
- 1996 Women's Olympic 5,000 metres (Atlanta)
- 1997 Women's World Championships 5,000 metres (Athens)
- 1998 Women's European Championships 5,000 metres (Budapest)
- 1999 Women's World Championships 5,000 metres (Seville)
- 2000 Women's Olympic 5,000 metres (Sydney)
