= 2000 European Athletics Indoor Championships – Women's 3000 metres =

The women's 3000 metres event at the 2000 European Athletics Indoor Championships was held on February 25–27.

== Medalists ==
Gold	Silver	Bronze
Gabriela Szabo; Romania	Lidia Chojecka; Poland	Marta Domínguez; Spain

== Results ==
=== Heats ===
First 4 of each heat (Q) and the next 4 fastest (q) qualified for the final.

Rank	Heat	Name	Nationality	Time	Notes
1	1	Gabriela Szabo	Romania	8:50.44	Q
2	1	Daniela Yordanova	Bulgaria	8:50.50	Q, NR
3	1	Jeļena Prokopčuka	Latvia	8:51.02	Q, NR
4	1	Marta Domínguez	Spain	8:51.51	Q, NR
5	1	Veerle Dejaeghere	Belgium	8:51.96	q, NR
6	2	Lidia Chojecka	Poland	8:58.03	Q
7	2	Olga Yegorova	Russia	8:58.17	Q
8	2	Fatima Yvelain	France	8:58.34	Q, PB
9	2	Helena Javornik	Slovenia	8:59.75	Q
10	2	Hayley Parry-Tullett	Great Britain	9:00.62	q
11	1	Yamina Belkacem	France	9:00.89	q, SB
12	2	Cristina Petite	Spain	9:03.75	q, SB
13	1	Silvia Sommaggio	Italy	9:04.29	
14	2	Luminita Gorgirlea	Romania	9:06.47	SB
15	2	Ana Dias	Portugal	9:11.13	
16	1	Alesia Turava	Belarus	9:12.88	PB
	1	Ebru Kavaklioglu	Turkey	DNF	
	2	Aysen Barak	Turkey	DNF	
	1	Violeta Szekely	Romania	DNS	
	2	Anja Smolders	Belgium	DNS	

=== Final ===
Rank	Name	Nationality	Time	Notes
1st place, gold medalist(s)	Gabriela Szabo	Romania	8:42.06	
2nd place, silver medalist(s)	Lidia Chojecka	Poland	8:42.42	NR
3rd place, bronze medalist(s)	Marta Domínguez	Spain	8:44.08	NR
4	Jeļena Prokopčuka	Latvia	8:44.66	NR
5	Daniela Yordanova	Bulgaria	8:47.45	NR
6	Olga Yegorova	Russia	8:49.18	PB
7	Hayley Parry-Tullett	Great Britain	8:55.31	
8	Fatima Yvelain	France	8:56.55	PB
9	Veerle Dejaeghere	Belgium	8:59.66	
10	Helena Javornik	Slovenia	9:00.85	
11	Yamina Belkacem	France	9:03.08	
12	Cristina Petite	Spain	9:08.71	
