= 2001 World Championships in Athletics – Women's 5000 metres =

International sporting competition

These are the official results of the Women's 5000 metres event at the 2001 IAAF World Championships in Edmonton, Canada.

Olga Yegorova had tested positive for EPO earlier in 2001 which drew protests from her fellow competitors after she was allowed to compete in the World Athletics Championships. Although her urine sample tested positive for EPO, the French authorities failed to take an accompanying blood test and she avoided a suspension on a technicality.

== Medalists ==
Gold	Olga Yegorova; Russia (RUS)
Silver	Marta Domínguez; Spain (ESP)
Bronze	Ayelech Worku; Ethiopia (ETH)

== Results ==
=== Heats ===
Qualification: First 5 in each heat (Q) and the next 5 fastest (q) advanced to the final.

Rank	Heat	Name	Nationality	Time	Notes
1	2	Yanmei Dong	China	15:09.44	Q, SB
2	2	Joanne Pavey	Great Britain	15:10.62	Q, SB
3	2	Yelena Zadorozhnaya	Russia	15:11.63	Q
4	2	Rose Cheruiyot	Kenya	15:12.04	Q
5	2	Irina Mikitenko	Germany	15:12.63	Q
6	2	Merima Denboba	Ethiopia	15:14.76	q
7	1	Marta Domínguez	Spain	15:15.81	Q
8	1	Olga Yegorova	Russia	15:15.85	Q
9	1	Tatyana Tomashova	Russia	15:15.95	Q
10	1	Gabriela Szabo	Romania	15:16.02	Q
11	1	Edith Masai	Kenya	15:16.13	Q
12	1	Ayelech Worku	Ethiopia	15:16.18	q
13	2	Benita Willis	Australia	15:17.93	q
14	2	Teresa Recio	Spain	15:19.81	q
15	2	Fatima Yvelain	France	15:20.16	q
16	1	Kathy Butler	Great Britain	15:20.78	
17	1	Elvan Abeylegesse	Turkey	15:22.89	
18	2	Haruko Okamoto	Japan	15:23.93	PB
19	1	Marla Runyan	United States	15:24.30	
20	2	Elva Dryer	United States	15:26.04	
21	2	Beatriz Santiago	Spain	15:26.55	
22	1	Breeda Dennehy-Willis	Ireland	15:26.97	
23	2	Dulce Maria Rodriguez	Mexico	15:27.34	
24	2	Olivera Jevtić	Yugoslavia	15:29.61	
25	1	Werknesh Kidane	Ethiopia	15:29.96	
26	1	Restituta Joseph	Tanzania	15:33.93	
27	1	Susanne Pumper	Austria	15:41.25	
28	1	Courtney Babcock	Canada	15:46.72	
29	1	Amy Rudolph	United States	15:46.77	
30	2	Inga Juodeskiene	Lithuania	15:48.13	SB
31	2	Gunhild Haugen	Norway	15:54.56	
32	1	Hayley Yelling	Great Britain	15:59.39	
33	2	Maria McCambridge	Ireland	16:04.49	
34	1	Mónica Rosa	Portugal	16:04.62	
35	2	ManYee Chan-Ropper	Hong Kong	16:16.06	
36	1	Una English	Ireland	16:26.15	
37	2	Catherine Chikwakwa	Malawi	16:36.85	NR
38	1	Nebiat Habtemariam	Eritrea	16:37.57	
	1	Nasria Baghdad-Azaïdj	Algeria	DQ	
	1	Zhor El Kamch	Morocco	DNF	
	1	Daniela Yordanova	Bulgaria	DNF	
	2	Wisam Abu Bekheet	Palestine	DNF	
	2	Hrisostomia Iakovou	Greece	DNS	

=== Final ===
Rank	Name	Nationality	Time	Notes
1st place, gold medalist(s)	Olga Yegorova	Russia	15:03.39	
2nd place, silver medalist(s)	Marta Domínguez	Spain	15:06.59	
3rd place, bronze medalist(s)	Ayelech Worku	Ethiopia	15:10.17	
4	Yanmei Dong	China	15:10.73	
5	Irina Mikitenko	Germany	15:13.93	
6	Yelena Zadorozhnaya	Russia	15:16.15	
7	Edith Masai	Kenya	15:17.67	
8	Gabriela Szabo	Romania	15:19.55	
9	Rose Cheruiyot	Kenya	15:23.18	
10	Tatyana Tomashova	Russia	15:23.83	
11	Joanne Pavey	Great Britain	15:28.41	
12	Benita Willis	Australia	15:36.75	
13	Merima Denboba	Ethiopia	15:41.09	
14	Fatima Yvelain	France	15:53.52	
15	Teresa Recio	Spain	15:57.32	
