= 1999 IAAF World Indoor Championships – Women's 3000 metres =

The women's 3000 metres event at the 1999 IAAF World Indoor Championships was held on March 7.

== Results ==
Rank	Name	Nationality	Time	Notes
1st place, gold medalist(s)	Gabriela Szabo	Romania	8:36.42	
2nd place, silver medalist(s)	Zahra Ouaziz	Morocco	8:38.43	AR
3rd place, bronze medalist(s)	Regina Jacobs	United States	8:39.14	AR
4	Yamna Oubouhou-Belkacem	France	8:41.63	NR
5	Violeta Beclea-Szekely	Romania	8:47.80	PB
6	Olga Yegorova	Russia	8:49.34	PB
7	Cristina Petite	Spain	8:52.85	PB
8	Wang Chunmei	China	8:53.44	AR
9	Helena Javornik	Slovenia	9:00.92	
10	Akiko Kawashima	Japan	9:01.39	NR
	Rodica Daniela Nagel	France	DNF	
	Andrea Šuldesová	Czech Republic	DNF	
