= Masters W35 10000 metres world record progression =

This is the progression of world record improvements of the 10000 metres W35 division of Masters athletics.

Key

Incomplete information Pending

Hand	Auto	Athlete	Nationality	Birthdate	Location	Date
	30:30.26	Edith Masai	Kenya	04.04.1967	Helsinki	06.08.2005
	30:53.20	Jo Pavey	United Kingdom	20.09.1973	London	03.08.2012
	31:06.63	Helena Javornik	Slovenia	26.03.1966	Athens	27.08.2004
	31:07.58	Alla Zhilyayeva	Russia	05.02.1969	Tula	25.06.2004
	31:20.28	Ingrid Kristiansen	Norway	21.03.1956	Hechtel	10.08.1991
	31:26.94	Maria Konovalova	Russia	14.08.1974	Berlin	15.08.2009
	31:28.92	Francis Larrieu Smith	United States	23.11.1952	Austin	04.04.1991
	32:19.50	Zoya Ivanova	Kazakhstan	14.03.1952	Seoul	30.09.1988
