= 1994 European Athletics Championships – Women's 3000 metres =

Women's 3000 metres at the European Athletics Championships

These are the official results of the Women's 3,000 metres event at the 1994 European Championships in Helsinki, Finland, held at Helsinki Olympic Stadium on 7 and 10 August 1994.

== Medalists ==
Gold	Sonia O'Sullivan; Ireland
Silver	Yvonne Murray; United Kingdom
Bronze	Gabriela Szabo; Romania

== Final ==
Rank	Final	Time
	Sonia O'Sullivan (IRL)	8:31.84
	Yvonne Murray (GBR)	8:36.48
	Gabriela Szabo (ROM)	8:40:08
4.	Olga Churbanova (RUS)	8:40:48
5.	Lyudmila Borisova (RUS)	8:41:71
6.	Alison Wyeth (GBR)	8:45:76
7.	Farida Fatès (FRA)	8:46:04
8.	Nadia Dandolo (ITA)	8:49:42
9.	Cristina Misaros (ROM)	8:49:69
10.	Roberta Brunet (ITA)	8:50:76
11.	Sonia McGeorge (GBR)	8:51:55
12.	Anita Philpott (IRL)	8:54:79
13.	Brynhild Synstnes (NOR)	8:59:17
14.	Päivi Tikkanen (FIN)	9:06:93
15.	Grete Koens (NED)	9:14:35

== Semifinals ==
- Held on 7 August 1994

Rank	Heat 1	Time
1.	Sonia O'Sullivan (IRL)	8:51.30
2.	Olga Churbanova (RUS)	8:52.47
3.	Alison Wyeth (GBR)	8:52.68
4.	Sonia McGeorge (GBR)	8:52.73
5.	Roberta Brunet (ITA)	8:52.80
6.	Cristina Misaros (ROM)	8:52.98
7.	Farida Fatès (FRA)	8:55.17
8.	Grete Koens (NED)	8:56.21
9.	Anita Philpott (IRL)	8:57.74
10.	Yelena Kaledina (RUS)	8:58.86
11.	Gunhild Halle (NOR)	8:59.11
12.	Renata Sobiesiak (POL)	9:01.95
13.	Estela Estévez (ESP)	9:03.02
14.	Serap Aktaş (TUR)	9:07.04

Rank	Heat 2	Time
1.	Yvonne Murray (GBR)	8:54.46
2.	Lyudmila Borisova (RUS)	8:54.99
3.	Gabriela Szabo (ROM)	8:55.83
4.	Päivi Tikkanen (FIN)	8:56.99
5.	Nadia Dandolo (ITA)	8:57.38
6.	Brynhild Synstnes (NOR)	8:58.75
7.	Hilde Stavik (NOR)	8:58.80
8.	Silvia Sommaggio (ITA)	8:59.58
9.	Anikó Javos (HUN)	9:01.98
10.	Milka Mikhailova (BUL)	9:02.74
11.	Andrea Karhoff (GER)	9:07.64
12.	Julia Vaquero (ESP)	9:11.76
13.	Geraldine Hendricken (IRL)	9:30.81
—	Marina Bastos (POR)	DNF

== Participation ==
According to an unofficial count, 28 athletes from 16 countries participated in the event.

- Bulgaria (1)
- Finland (1)
- France (1)
- Germany (1)
- Hungary (1)
- Ireland (3)
- Italy (3)
- Netherlands (1)
- Norway (3)
- Poland (1)
- Portugal (1)
- Romania (2)
- Russia (3)
- Spain (2)
- Turkey (1)
- United Kingdom (3)

== See also ==
- 1990 Women's European Championships 3,000 metres (Split)
- 1991 Women's World Championships 3,000 metres (Tokyo)
- 1992 Women's Olympic 3,000 metres (Barcelona)
- 1993 Women's World Championships 3,000 metres (Stuttgart)
- 1995 Women's World Championships 5,000 metres (Gothenburg)
- 1996 Women's Olympic 5,000 metres (Atlanta)
- 1997 Women's World Championships 5,000 metres (Athens)
- 1998 Women's European Championships 5,000 metres (Budapest)
