= 1995 IAAF World Indoor Championships – Women's 3000 metres =

The women's 3000 metres event at the 1995 IAAF World Indoor Championships was held on 12 March.

== Results ==
Rank	Name	Nationality	Time	Notes
1st place, gold medalist(s)	Gabriela Szabo	Romania	8:54.50	
2nd place, silver medalist(s)	Lynn Jennings	United States	8:55.23	
3rd place, bronze medalist(s)	Joan Nesbit	United States	8:56.08	
4	Elisa Rea	Italy	8:56.21	
5	Lidiya Vasilevskaya	Russia	8:58.28	
6	Marta Domínguez	Spain	9:01.79	
7	Zahra Ouaziz	Morocco	9:03.84	
8	Annette Sergent-Palluy	France	9:04.03	
9	Sinéad Delahunty	Ireland	9:04.16	
10	Marina Bastos	Portugal	9:16.19	
11	Sandra Córtez	Bolivia	9:47.24	
12	Mariya Pantyukhova	Russia	9:51.61	
13	Gulsara Dadabayeva	Tajikistan	10:41.43	
	Kay Gooch	New Zealand	DNS	
