= 1998 European Athletics Indoor Championships – Women's 3000 metres =

The women's 3000 metres event at the 1998 European Athletics Indoor Championships was held on 1 March.

== Results ==
Rank	Name	Nationality	Time	Notes
1st place, gold medalist(s)	Gabriela Szabo	Romania	8:49.96	
2nd place, silver medalist(s)	Fernanda Ribeiro	Portugal	8:51.42	
3rd place, bronze medalist(s)	Marta Domínguez	Spain	8:57.72	
4	Jeļena Čelnova	Latvia	9:00.78	
5	Hrisostomia Iakovou	Greece	9:01.06	
6	Zahia Dahmani	France	9:02.77	
7	Kristina da Fonseca-Wollheim	Germany	9:02.94	
8	Olga Yegorova	Russia	9:05.74	
9	Lale Öztürk	Turkey	9:12.58	
10	Cristina Petite	Spain	9:13.16	
11	Elisa Rea	Italy	9:16.14	
12	Una English	Ireland	9:22.98	
	Mariya Pantyukhova	Russia	DNS	
