= 2002 European Athletics Championships – Women's 5000 metres =

Track running event

Women's 5000 metres at the European Athletics Championships

The women's 5000 metres at the 2002 European Athletics Championships were held at the Olympic Stadium on August 10.

== Results ==
Rank	Name	Nationality	Time	Notes
1st place, gold medalist(s)	Marta Domínguez	Spain	15:14.76	
2nd place, silver medalist(s)	Sonia O'Sullivan	Ireland	15:14.85	SB
3rd place, bronze medalist(s)	Yelena Zadorozhnaya	Russia	15:15.22	
4	Olga Yegorova	Russia	15:16.65	
5	Joanne Pavey	Great Britain	15:18.70	
6	Mihaela Botezan	Romania	15:19.12	
7	Elvan Abeylegesse	Turkey	15:24.41	
8	Gunhild Haugen	Norway	15:30.19	
9	Sonja Stolić	Yugoslavia	15:33.42	PB
10	Melanie Schulz	Germany	15:46.64	
11	Gloria Marconi	Italy	15:47.63	
12	Inês Monteiro	Portugal	15:55.79	
13	Silvia Weissteiner	Italy	15:58.92	
14	Helena Javornik	Slovenia	16:06.32	
15	Una English	Ireland	16:19.36	
16	Krisztina Papp	Hungary	16:20.23	
17	Liliya Volkova	Russia	16:21.21	
18	Hayley Yelling	Great Britain	16:26.41	
19	Maria McCambridge	Ireland	17:00.15	
	Marina Bastos	Portugal	DNF	
	Maria Protopapa	Greece	DNF	
	Olivera Jevtić	Yugoslavia	DNF	
	Chrystosomia Iakovou	Greece	DNS	
