= 2002 European Athletics Championships – Women's 1500 metres =

Women's 1500 metres at the European Athletics Championships

The women's 1500 metres at the 2002 European Athletics Championships were held at the Olympic Stadium on August 9–11.

== Medalists ==
Gold	Silver	Bronze
Süreyya Ayhan; Turkey	Gabriela Szabo; Romania	Tatyana Tomashova; Russia

== Results ==
=== Heats ===
Qualification: First 3 of each heat (Q) and the next 3 fastest (q) qualified for the final.

Rank	Heat	Name	Nationality	Time	Notes
1	2	Süreyya Ayhan	Turkey	4:04.42	Q
2	3	Tatyana Tomashova	Russia	4:05.04	Q
3	3	Gabriela Szabo	Romania	4:05.14	Q
4	3	Nuria Fernández	Spain	4:05.42	Q
5	3	Carla Sacramento	Portugal	4:05.70	q
6	3	Alesia Turava	Belarus	4:05.75	q
7	3	Lidia Chojecka	Poland	4:05.78	q
8	1	Judit Varga	Hungary	4:07.71	Q
9	1	Daniela Yordanova	Bulgaria	4:07.76	Q
10	1	Iris Fuentes-Pila	Spain	4:07.89	Q
11	1	Kelly Holmes	Great Britain	4:08.11	
12	2	Iryna Lishchynska	Ukraine	4:08.89	Q
13	2	Natalia Rodríguez	Spain	4:08.91	Q
14	2	Kathleen Friedrich	Germany	4:08.98	
15	1	Elena Iagăr	Romania	4:09.37	
16	2	Helen Pattinson	Great Britain	4:09.66	
17	2	Lena Nilsson	Sweden	4:09.89	
18	3	Hayley Tullett	Great Britain	4:10.68	
19	2	Veerle Dejaeghere	Belgium	4:10.88	
20	1	Yekaterina Puzanova	Russia	4:11.49	
21	1	Maria Tsirba	Germany	4:12.75	
22	1	Trine Pilskog	Norway	4:13.84	
23	3	Maria Lynch	Ireland	4:14.41	
24	3	Heidi Jensen	Denmark	4:16.01	
25	1	Rasa Drazdauskaitė	Lithuania	4:16.80	
25	3	Kristin Roset	Norway	4:17.40	
26	1	Anjolie Wisse	Netherlands	4:17.89	
27	2	Geraldine Hendricken	Ireland	4:18.13	
28	2	Helena Javornik	Slovenia	4:18.46	
29	2	Lívia Tóth	Hungary	4:19.53	
30	3	Sonja Roman	Slovenia	4:19.87	
31	2	Sara Palmas	Italy	4:28.31	

=== Final ===
Rank	Name	Nationality	Time	Notes
1st place, gold medalist(s)	Süreyya Ayhan	Turkey	3:58.79	NR
2nd place, silver medalist(s)	Gabriela Szabo	Romania	3:58.81	
3rd place, bronze medalist(s)	Tatyana Tomashova	Russia	4:01.28	PB
4	Judit Varga	Hungary	4:02.37	
5	Daniela Yordanova	Bulgaria	4:03.03	
6	Natalia Rodríguez	Spain	4:06.15	
7	Alesia Turava	Belarus	4:06.64	
8	Nuria Fernández	Spain	4:07.11	
9	Lidia Chojecka	Poland	4:10.56	
10	Iryna Lishchynska	Ukraine	4:11.70	
11	Iris Fuentes-Pila	Spain	4:13.02	
12	Carla Sacramento	Portugal	4:17.01	
