= 2001 IAAF World Indoor Championships – Women's 3000 metres =

The women's 3000 metres event at the 2001 IAAF World Indoor Championships was held on March 9–10.

== Medalists ==
Gold	Silver	Bronze
Olga Yegorova; Russia	Gabriela Szabo; Romania	Yelena Zadorozhnaya; Russia

== Results ==
=== Heats ===
First 5 of each heat (Q) and the next 2 fastest (q) qualified for the semifinals.

Rank	Heat	Name	Nationality	Time	Notes
1	2	Sonia O'Sullivan	Ireland	8:55.79	Q
2	2	Gabriela Szabo	Romania	8:55.84	Q
3	2	Olga Yegorova	Russia	8:55.97	Q
4	2	Regina Jacobs	United States	8:56.92	Q
5	2	Asmae Leghzaoui	Morocco	8:56.97	Q
6	2	Kathy Butler	Great Britain	8:58.60	q
7	2	Werknesh Kidane	Ethiopia	8:59.42	q
8	1	Yelena Zadorozhnaya	Russia	9:01.04	Q
9	1	Benita Willis	Australia	9:01.55	Q
10	1	Marta Domínguez	Spain	9:01.62	Q
11	1	Dong Yanmei	China	9:02.09	Q
12	1	Hayley Tullett	Great Britain	9:02.23	Q
13	1	Cheri Goddard-Kenah	United States	9:02.24	
14	2	Maria Cristina Petite	Spain	9:06.49	
15	2	Li Ji	China	9:06.78	
16	1	Elena Iagăr	Romania	9:08.46	
17	2	Chrysostomia Iakovou	Greece	9:12.15	
18	1	Sonia Lopes	Cape Verde	11:37.38	NR
	1	Marina Bastos	Portugal	DNF	

=== Final ===
Rank	Name	Nationality	Time	Notes
1st place, gold medalist(s)	Olga Yegorova	Russia	8:37.48	NR
2nd place, silver medalist(s)	Gabriela Szabo	Romania	8:39.65	
3rd place, bronze medalist(s)	Yelena Zadorozhnaya	Russia	8:40.15	PB
4	Marta Domínguez	Spain	8:40.98	NR
5	Dong Yanmei	China	8:41.34	AR
6	Benita Willis	Australia	8:42.75	AR
7	Sonia O'Sullivan	Ireland	8:44.37	NR
8	Hayley Tullett	Great Britain	8:45.36	PB
9	Werknesh Kidane	Ethiopia	8:46.56	
10	Asmae Leghzaoui	Morocco	8:47.60	
11	Kathy Butler	Great Britain	9:04.81	
12	Regina Jacobs	United States	9:05.33	
