= 2001 IAAF World Indoor Championships – Women's 1500 metres =

The women's 1500 metres event at the 2001 IAAF World Indoor Championships was held on March 10–11.

== Medalists ==
Gold	Silver	Bronze
Hasna Benhassi; Morocco	Violeta Beclea-Szekely; Romania	Natalya Gorelova; Russia

== Results ==
=== Heats ===
First 3 of each heat (Q) and the next 3 fastest (q) qualified for the semifinals.

Rank	Heat	Name	Nationality	Time	Notes
1	1	Violeta Beclea-Szekely	Romania	4:10.77	Q
2	1	Carla Sacramento	Portugal	4:10.82	Q
3	1	Sonia O'Sullivan	Ireland	4:11.27	Q
4	1	Helena Javornik	Slovenia	4:11.28	q
5	2	Hasna Benhassi	Morocco	4:11.54	Q
6	2	Natalya Gorelova	Russia	4:11.69	Q
7	2	Daniela Yordanova	Bulgaria	4:12.33	Q
8	2	Nuria Fernández	Spain	4:12.92	q
9	2	Alesia Turava	Belarus	4:13.15	q
10	1	Georgie Clarke	Australia	4:13.21	AR
11	1	Lan Lixin	China	4:14.64	AR
12	1	Brigitte Mühlbacher	Austria	4:15.37	SB
13	2	Andrea Šuldesová	Czech Republic	4:15.57	
14	1	Heidi Jensen	Denmark	4:16.31	
15	1	Fatma Lanouar	Tunisia	4:16.42	NR
16	2	Maria Cioncan	Romania	4:17.47	
17	2	Collette Liss	United States	4:19.23	
18	1	Judit Varga	Hungary	4:19.45	
19	2	Li Jingnan	China	4:22.34	

=== Final ===
Rank	Name	Nationality	Time	Notes
1st place, gold medalist(s)	Hasna Benhassi	Morocco	4:10.83	
2nd place, silver medalist(s)	Violeta Beclea-Szekely	Romania	4:11.17	
3rd place, bronze medalist(s)	Natalya Gorelova	Russia	4:11.74	
4	Carla Sacramento	Portugal	4:11.76	
5	Daniela Yordanova	Bulgaria	4:12.79	
6	Alesia Turava	Belarus	4:13.67	
7	Nuria Fernández	Spain	4:15.37	
8	Helena Javornik	Slovenia	4:15.76	
9	Sonia O'Sullivan	Ireland	4:19.40	
