= 2001 World Championships in Athletics – Women's 1500 metres =

These are the official results of the Women's 1500 metres event at the 2001 IAAF World Championships in Edmonton, Canada. The winning margin was 1.13 seconds.

== Medalists ==
Gold	Gabriela Szabo; Romania (ROM)
Silver	Violeta Szekely; Romania (ROM)
Bronze	Natalya Gorelova; Russia (RUS)

== Results ==
=== Heats ===
Qualification: First 6 in each heat (Q) and the next 6 fastest (q) advanced to the semifinals.

Rank	Heat	Name	Nationality	Time	Notes
1	1	Süreyya Ayhan	Turkey	4:07.97	Q
2	1	Carla Sacramento	Portugal	4:08.79	Q
3	1	Mardrea Hyman	Jamaica	4:08.84	Q
4	1	Suzy Favor-Hamilton	United States	4:08.89	Q
5	1	Yuliya Kosenkova	Russia	4:09.17	Q
6	1	Natalia Rodríguez	Spain	4:09.86	Q
7	2	Gabriela Szabo	Romania	4:10.77	Q
8	2	Lidia Chojecka	Poland	4:10.82	Q
9	2	Leah Pells	Canada	4:11.17	Q
10	2	Natalya Gorelova	Russia	4:11.34	Q
11	2	Kathleen Friedrich	Germany	4:11.35	Q
12	2	Daniela Yordanova	Bulgaria	4:12.29	Q
13	2	Lan Lixin	China	4:12.92	q, SB
14	2	Abebech Negussie	Ethiopia	4:13.02	q
15	2	Helen Pattinson	Great Britain	4:13.06	q
16	1	Veerle Dejaeghere	Belgium	4:13.07	q
17	3	Violeta Szekely	Romania	4:13.19	Q
18	3	Hayley Tullett	Great Britain	4:13.60	Q
19	3	Olga Nelyubova	Russia	4:13.61	Q
20	3	Sarah Schwald	United States	4:13.69	Q
21	3	Alesya Turova	Belarus	4:13.72	Q
22	3	Nuria Fernández	Spain	4:13.90	Q
23	3	Sabina Fischer	Switzerland	4:14.34	q
24	1	Nouria Merah-Benida	Algeria	4:15.06	q
25	3	Li Jingnan	China	4:15.30	
26	3	Georgie Clarke	Australia	4:15.31	
27	1	Irina Krakoviak	Lithuania	4:16.24	
28	3	Heidi Jensen	Denmark	4:17.35	
29	2	Rene Kalmer	South Africa	4:17.97	
30	1	Elena Iagăr	Romania	4:24.72	
31	3	Hanane Baala	France	4:29.47	
32	1	Lamberte Nyabamikazi	Burundi	4:31.11	NR
33	1	Elisa Vagnini	San Marino	4:40.01	
34	2	Evelyn Guerra	Panama	4:44.69	
35	3	Sonia Lopes	Cape Verde	5:13.80	
36	3	Fatouma Ali	Niger	5:31.57	
	1	Iryna Lishchynska	Ukraine	DNF	
	2	Regina Jacobs	United States	DNF	
	2	Rosa Saul	Angola	DNS	

=== Semifinals ===
Qualification: First 6 in each semifinal qualified directly (Q) for the final.

Rank	Heat	Name	Nationality	Time	Notes
1	2	Gabriela Szabo	Romania	4:07.40	Q
2	2	Natalya Gorelova	Russia	4:07.47	Q
3	2	Lidia Chojecka	Poland	4:08.37	Q
4	2	Leah Pells	Canada	4:08.49	Q, SB
5	2	Natalia Rodríguez	Spain	4:08.49	Q
6	2	Mardrea Hyman	Jamaica	4:08.58	Q
7	2	Sabina Fischer	Switzerland	4:09.66	
8	1	Violeta Szekely	Romania	4:10.30	Q
9	1	Süreyya Ayhan	Turkey	4:10.36	Q
10	2	Lan Lixin	China	4:11.09	SB
11	1	Carla Sacramento	Portugal	4:11.23	Q
12	1	Alesya Turova	Belarus	4:11.43	Q
13	1	Nuria Fernández	Spain	4:11.44	Q
14	1	Yuliya Kosenkova	Russia	4:11.46	Q
15	1	Sarah Schwald	United States	4:11.74	
16	2	Hayley Tullett	Great Britain	4:13.95	
17	1	Veerle Dejaeghere	Belgium	4:15.70	
18	1	Helen Pattinson	Great Britain	4:16.39	
19	2	Abebech Negussie	Ethiopia	4:29.57	
	1	Daniela Yordanova	Bulgaria	DNF	
	1	Kathleen Friedrich	Germany	DNF	
	2	Suzy Favor-Hamilton	United States	DNF	
	1	Olga Nelyubova	Russia	DNS	
	1	Nouria Merah-Benida	Algeria	DNS	

=== Final ===
Rank	Name	Nationality	Time	Notes
1st place, gold medalist(s)	Gabriela Szabo	Romania	4:00.57	SB
2nd place, silver medalist(s)	Violeta Szekely	Romania	4:01.70	
3rd place, bronze medalist(s)	Natalya Gorelova	Russia	4:02.40	
4	Carla Sacramento	Portugal	4:03.96	
5	Lidia Chojecka	Poland	4:06.70	
6	Natalia Rodríguez	Spain	4:07.10	
7	Alesya Turova	Belarus	4:07.25	SB
8	Süreyya Ayhan	Turkey	4:08.17	
9	Yuliya Kosenkova	Russia	4:08.84	
10	Mardrea Hyman	Jamaica	4:12.48	
11	Leah Pells	Canada	4:15.34	
12	Nuria Fernández	Spain	4:17.86	
