= 1998 European Athletics Championships – Women's 10,000 metres =

Women's 10,000 metres at the European Athletics Championships

The women's 10,000 metres at the 1998 European Athletics Championships was held at the Népstadion on 19 August.

== Medalists ==
Gold	Sonia O'Sullivan; Ireland
Silver	Fernanda Ribeiro; Portugal
Bronze	Lidia Șimon; Romania

== Results ==
KEY:	q	Fastest non-qualifiers	Q	Qualified	NR	National record	PB	Personal best	SB	Seasonal best

=== Final ===
Rank	Name	Nationality	Time	Notes
1st place, gold medalist(s)	Sonia O'Sullivan	Ireland	31:29.33	
2nd place, silver medalist(s)	Fernanda Ribeiro	Portugal	31:32.42	
3rd place, bronze medalist(s)	Lidia Șimon	Romania	31:32.64	
4	Olivera Jevtić	Yugoslavia	31:34.26	NR
5	Paula Radcliffe	Great Britain	31:36.51	
6	Julia Vaquero	Spain	31:46.47	
7	Annemari Sandell	Finland	32:22.50	
8	Irina Mikitenko	Germany	32:30.67	
9	María Luisa Larraga	Spain	32:37.10	
10	Lyudmila Biktasheva	Russia	32:37.64	
11	Maria Guida	Italy	32:39.16	
12	Anikó Kálovics	Hungary	33:09.87	
13	Hilde Hovdenak	Norway	33:11.88	
14	Helena Javornik	Slovenia	33:16.40	
	Alla Zhilyaeva	Russia	DNF	
	Lidiya Vasilevskaya	Russia	DNF	
	Maria Abel	Spain	DNF	
