= 2002 European Athletics Championships – Women's 10,000 metres =

Women's 10,000 metres at the European Athletics Championships

The women's 10,000 metres at the 2002 European Athletics Championships were held at the Olympic Stadium on 6 August.

== Results ==
Rank	Name	Nationality	Time	Notes
1st place, gold medalist(s)	Paula Radcliffe	Great Britain	30:01.09	AR
2nd place, silver medalist(s)	Sonia O'Sullivan	Ireland	30:47.59	NR
3rd place, bronze medalist(s)	Lyudmila Biktasheva	Russia	31:04.00	PB
4	Mihaela Botezan	Romania	31:13.96	NR
5	Jeļena Prokopčuka	Latvia	31:17.72	NR
6	Olivera Jevtić	Yugoslavia	31:47.82	
7	Constantina Diţă-Tomescu	Romania	31:53.61	PB
8	Gunhild Haugen	Norway	31:57.02	
9	Sonja Stolić	Yugoslavia	32:00.55	PB
10	Sabrina Mockenhaupt	Germany	32:08.52	PB
11	Galina Alexandrova	Russia	32:11.52	PB
12	Maura Viceconte	Italy	32:12.66	SB
13	Chrystosomia Iakovou	Greece	32:18.62	NR
14	Anikó Kálovics	Hungary	32:22.61	SB
15	Alena Samokhvalova	Russia	32:30.33	
16	Luminița Talpoș	Romania	32:30.48	
17	Marie Davenport	Ireland	32:35.11	
18	Fatima Yvelain	France	32:40.40	
19	Ana Dias	Portugal	32:41.56	
20	Liz Yelling	Great Britain	32:44.44	
21	Bente Landoy	Norway	32:47.47	PB
22	Inga Juodeškienė	Lithuania	32:58.56	PB
23	Mónica Rosa	Portugal	32:59.22	
24	Gloria Marconi	Italy	33:01.11	
25	Luisa Larraga	Spain	33:14.05	
26	Anne Keenan	Ireland	33:19.94	
27	Nili Avramski	Israel	34:51.15	
	Nataliya Berkut	Ukraine	DNF	
	Fernanda Ribeiro	Portugal	DNF	
