= 1997 IAAF World Indoor Championships – Women's 3000 metres =

The women's 3000 metres event at the 1997 IAAF World Indoor Championships was held on March 8.

== Results ==
Rank	Name	Nationality	Time	Notes
1st place, gold medalist(s)	Gabriela Szabo	Romania	8:45.75	WL
2nd place, silver medalist(s)	Sonia O'Sullivan	Ireland	8:46.19	NR
3rd place, bronze medalist(s)	Fernanda Ribeiro	Portugal	8:49.79	
4	Marina Bastos	Portugal	8:52.64	
5	Marta Domínguez	Spain	8:52.74	NR
6	Olga Yegorova	Russia	8:52.99	PB
7	Farida Fatès	France	8:54.98	PB
8	Laurence Duquénoy	France	9:00.27	
9	Luminita Gogîrlea	Romania	9:00.75	SB
10	Estíbaliz Urrutia	Spain	9:01.68	PB
11	Etaferahu Tarekegne	Ethiopia	9:02.42	AR
12	Cheri Goddard	United States	9:04.05	
13	Kristina da Fonseca-Wollheim	Germany	9:05.78	
14	Luminita Zaituc	Germany	9:17.50	
15	Sinéad Delahunty	Ireland	9:19.93	
