= Athletics at the 1993 Summer Universiade – Women's 1500 metres =

The women's 1500 metres event at the 1993 Summer Universiade was held at the UB Stadium in Buffalo, United States on 18 July 1993.

== Results ==
Rank	Athlete	Nationality	Time	Notes
1st place, gold medalist(s)	Lynne Robinson	Great Britain	4:12.03	
2nd place, silver medalist(s)	Julie Speights	United States	4:12.43	
3rd place, bronze medalist(s)	Sarah Howell	Canada	4:13.30	
4	Mélanie Choiniere	Canada	4:14.72	
5	Elisa Rea	Italy	4:14.92	
6	Edna Lankry	Israel	4:15.32	
7	Jayne Spark	Great Britain	4:16.02	
8	Kristen Seabury	United States	4:17.37	
9	Amina Amaddah	Morocco	4:22.81	
10	Kari Uglem	Norway	4:32.77	
11	Charlene Neptune	Trinidad and Tobago	4:35.27	
12	Shirley Cespedes	Costa Rica	4:44.33	
	Sacha Stephens	Australia	DNF	
