= Gabriela Szabo =

Romanian runner

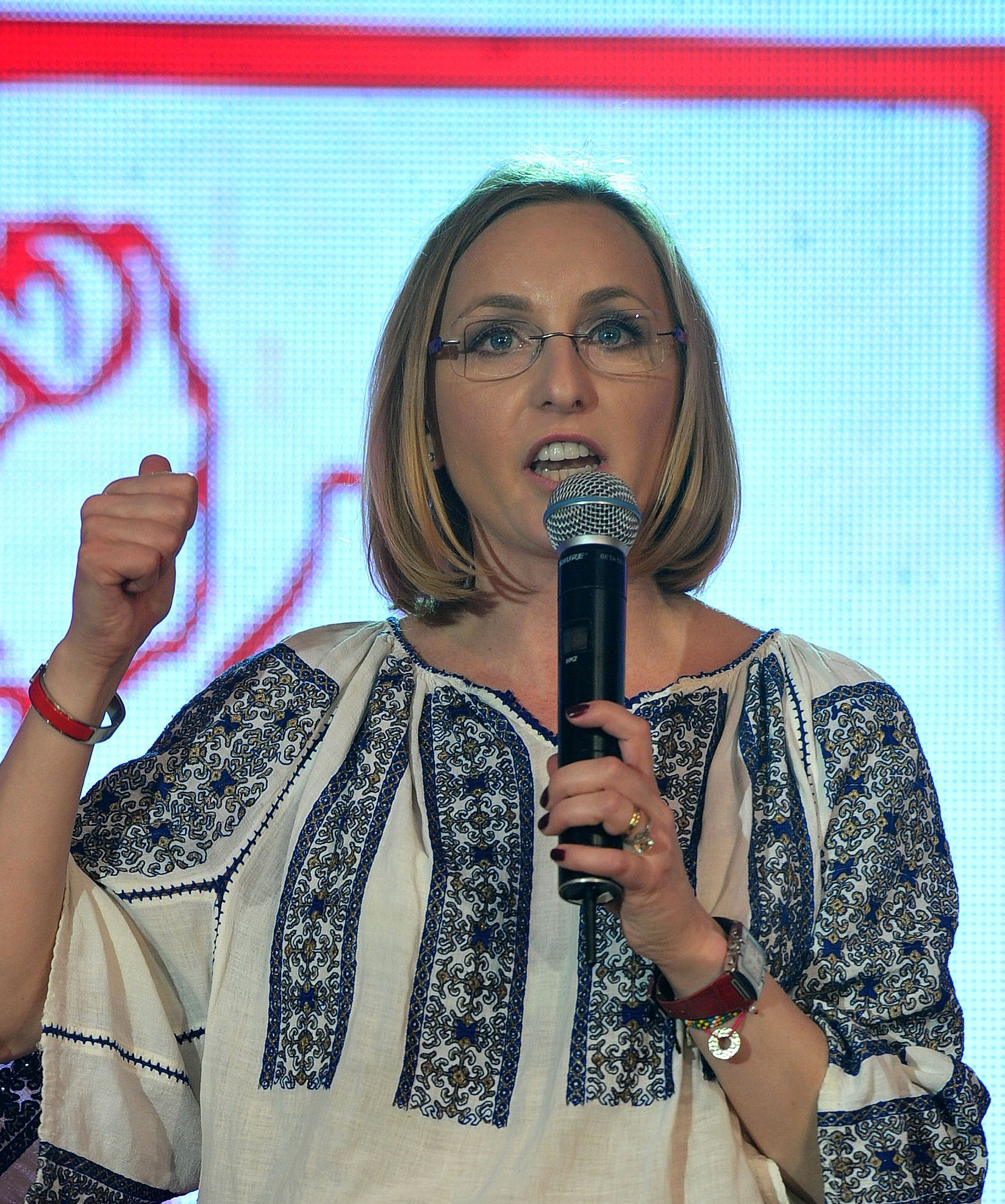
- Gabriela Szabo in May 2014

Personal information
- Nickname: Gabi
- Born: 14 November 1975 (age 50) Bistriţa, Romania
- Height: 1.52 m (5 ft 0 in)
- Weight: 42 kg (93 lb)

Sport
- Sport: Running
Medal record
Representing Romania
Event	1st	2nd	3rd
Olympic Games	1	1	1
World Championships	3	0	0
World Indoor Championships	4	1	0
European Championships	0	1	1
European Indoor Championships	2	0	0
Universiade	2	0	0
Total	11	3	3
Olympic Games
Gold medal – first place	2000 Sydney	5000 m
Silver medal – second place	1996 Atlanta	1500 m
Bronze medal – third place	2000 Sydney	1500 m
World Championships
Gold medal – first place	1997 Athens	5000 m
Gold medal – first place	1999 Seville	5000 m
Gold medal – first place	2001 Edmonton	1500 m
European Championships
Silver medal – second place	1998 Budapest	5000 m
Silver medal – second place	2002 Munich	1500 m
Bronze medal – third place	1994 Helsinki	3000 m
World Indoor Championships
Gold medal – first place	1995 Barcelona	3000 m
Gold medal – first place	1997 Paris	3000 m
Gold medal – first place	1999 Maebashi	3000 m
Gold medal – first place	1999 Maebashi	1500 m
Silver medal – second place	2001 Lisbon	3000 m
European Indoor Championships
Gold medal – first place	1998 Valencia	3000 m
Gold medal – first place	2000 Ghent	3000 m
Universiade
Gold medal – first place	1995 Fukuoka	5000 m
Gold medal – first place	1995 Fukuoka	1500 m

Gabriela Szabo (Romanian pronunciation: [ɡabriˈela ˈsabo], Hungarian: Szabó Gabriella; born 14 November 1975) is a retired Romanian runner. She competed in the 1500 m and 5000 m events at the 1996 and 2000 Olympics and won a gold, a silver and a bronze medal.

Szabo is a three-time world champion. She was named the BTA Best Balkan Athlete of the Year in 1999. Throughout her entire career she was coached by Zsolt Gyöngyössy, whom she eventually married. In May 2005 she retired from competitions due to exhaustion. She held the European record in the 3000 m between 2002 and 2019.

== Early life ==
Szabo was born to a Romanian mother and a Hungarian father. As a child, Szabo used to speak Hungarian with her friends, but she can only understand a few words today, which she regrets.

== Post-sport career ==
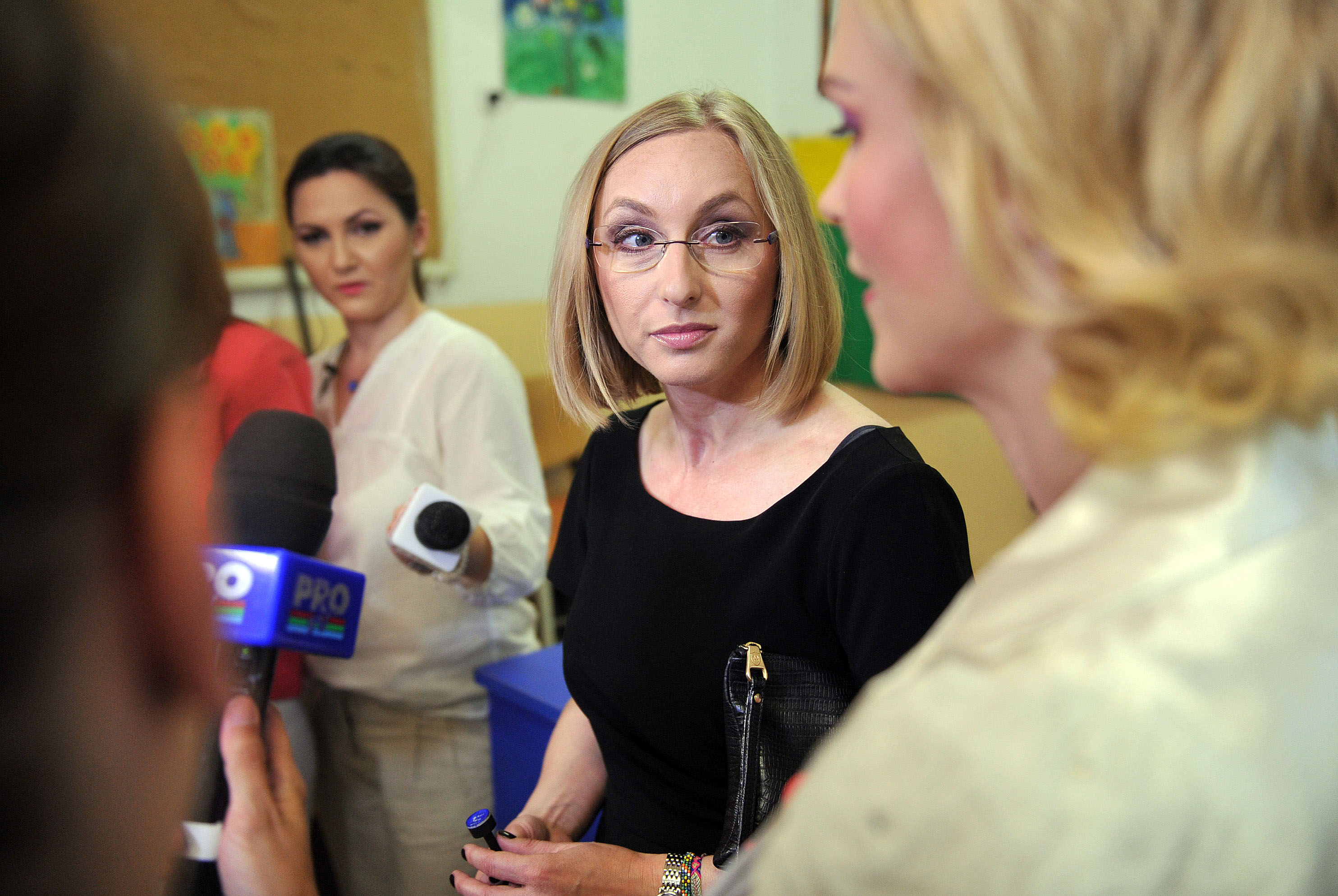
Gabriela Szabo as Minister of Youth and Sport in the third Ponta cabinet

As of 19 August 2013 she held the honorific title of Romanian Tourism Ambassador, together with 7 other cultural and sport personalities of Romania.

On 5 March 2014, she was appointed Minister of Youth and Sport in the Victor Ponta social-democratic government. She held the position until 17 November 2015.

== Competition record ==
Year	Competition	Venue	Position	Event	Notes
Representing Romania
1991	European Junior Championships	Thessaloniki, Greece	1st	3000 m	9:19.28
1992	World Junior Championships	Seoul, South Korea	2nd	3000 m	8:48.28
1993	European Junior Championships	San Sebastián, Spain	1st	3000 m	8:50.97
1994	World Junior Championships	Lisbon, Portugal	1st	3000 m	8:47.40
1994	European Championships	Helsinki, Finland	3rd	3000 m	8:40:08
1995	World Indoor Championships	Barcelona, Spain	1st	3000 m	8:54.50
1995	World Championships	Gothenburg, Sweden	4th	5000 m	14:56.57
1995	Universiade	Fukuoka, Japan	1st	1500 m	4:11.73
1995	Universiade	Fukuoka, Japan	1st	5000 m	15:29.86
1996	Olympic Games	Atlanta, United States	2nd	1500 m	4:01.54
1996	Olympic Games	Atlanta, United States	23rd (h)	5000 m	15:42.35
1997	World Indoor Championships	Paris, France	1st	3000 m	8:45.75
1997	World Championships	Athens, Greece	1st	5000 m	14:57.68
1997	Universiade	Catania, Italy	1st	1500 m	4:10.31
1998	European Indoor Championships	Valencia, Spain	1st	3000 m	8:49.96
1998	European Championships	Budapest, Hungary	2nd	5000 m	15:08.31
1999	World Indoor Championships	Maebashi, Japan	1st	1500 m	4:03.23
1999	World Indoor Championships	Maebashi, Japan	1st	3000 m	8:36.42
1999	World Championships	Seville, Spain	1st	5000 m	14:41.82
2000	European Indoor Championships	Ghent, Belgium	1st	3000 m	8:42.06
2000	Olympic Games	Sydney, Australia	3rd	1500 m	4:05.27
2000	Olympic Games	Sydney, Australia	1st	5000 m	14:40.79
2001	World Indoor Championships	Lisbon, Portugal	2nd	3000 m	8:39.65
2001	World Championships	Edmonton, Canada	1st	1500 m	4:00.57
2001	World Championships	Edmonton, Canada	8th	5000 m	15:19.55
2002	European Championships	Munich, Germany	2nd	1500 m	3:58.81
2003	World Championships	Paris, France	11th	5000 m	14:59.36

== Personal bests ==
=== Outdoor (track) ===
1500 metres - 3:56.97 (1998)
One mile - 4:19.30 (1998)
3000 metres - 8:21.42 (2002)
5000 metres - 14:31.48 (1998)

=== Indoor ===
1500 metres - 4:03.23 (1999)
One mile - 4:23.19 (2001)
2000 metres - 5:30.53 (1998)
3000 metres - 8:32.88 (2001)
5000 metres - 14:47.35 (1999)

== 2001 Accident ==
Szabo is remembered for a collision with German long-jumper Kofi Amoah Prah during an indoor meeting at Stuttgart in 2001. Szabo was leaving the track after her competition had finished while Amoah was running for his attempt. Szabo walked into Amoah's path and they collided heavily.

Awards
Preceded by (France) Christine Arron	Women's European Athlete of the Year; 1999	Succeeded by (Norway) Trine Hattestad
Preceded by (United States) Marion Jones	Women's Track & Field Athlete of the Year; 1999	Succeeded by (United States) Marion Jones
Preceded by (United States) Marion Jones	Gazzetta dello Sport; Sportswoman of the Year; 1999	Succeeded by (United States) Marion Jones
Sporting positions
Preceded by (Republic of Ireland) Sonia O'Sullivan	Women's 3,000 m Best Year Performance; 1997–2000	Succeeded by (Russia) Olga Yegorova
Preceded by (China) Jiang Bo	Women's 5,000 m Best Year Performance; 1998–1999	Succeeded by (Ethiopia) Getenesh Wami
Preceded by (Russia) Olga Yegorova	Women's 3,000 m Best Year Performance; 2002–2003	Succeeded by (Kenya) Isabella Ochichi
