= 1998 European Athletics Championships – Women's 5000 metres =

Women's 5000 metres at the European Athletics Championships

These are the official results of the Women's 5000 metres event at the 1998 European Championships in Budapest, Hungary. The final was held on 23 August 1998. The event replaced the 3,000 metres, which was contested for the last time at the European Championships four years ago in Helsinki, Finland.

== Medalists ==
Gold	Sonia O'Sullivan; Ireland
Silver	Gabriela Szabo; Romania
Bronze	Marta Domínguez; Spain

== Results ==
KEY:	q	Fastest non-qualifiers	Q	Qualified	NR	National record	PB	Personal best	SB	Seasonal best

=== Final ===
Rank	Name	Nationality	Time	Notes
1st place, gold medalist(s)	Sonia O'Sullivan	Ireland	15:06.50	CR
2nd place, silver medalist(s)	Gabriela Szabo	Romania	15:08.31	
3rd place, bronze medalist(s)	Marta Domínguez	Spain	15:10.54	
4	Olivera Jevtić	Yugoslavia	15:16.61	NR
5	Annemari Sandell	Finland	15:20.78	SB
6	Blandine Bitzner-Ducret	France	15:38.61	
7	Valerie Vaughan	Ireland	15:39.99	
8	Teresa Recio	Spain	15:40.54	
9	Kristina de Fonseca-Wollheim	Germany	15:42.07	
10	Anikó Javos	Hungary	15:53.18	
11	Olga Yegorova	Russia	15:54.82	
12	Dorte Vibjerg	Denmark	15:57.56	
13	Estíbaliz Urrutia	Spain	16:02.81	
14	Una English	Ireland	16:03.64	
15	Dorota Gruca	Poland	16:05.68	
16	Jeļena Čelnova	Latvia	16:21.75	
17	Yelena Kopytova	Russia	16:26.41	
	Helena Javornik	Slovenia	DNF	
	Joalsiae Llado	France	DNF	
	Eva Doczi	Hungary	DNF	
	Svetlana Baygulova	Russia	DNF	
