= Sónia Lopes =

Cape Verdean middle distance and long-distance runner

Personal information
- Full name: Sónia Lopes
- Nationality: Cape Verdean
- Born: April 6, 1975 (age 51)

Sport
- Country: Cape Verde
- Sport: Athletics
- Event: long-distances
- Updated on 3 January 2014

Sónia Lopes (born 6 April 1975) is a Cape Verdean middle distance and long-distance runner.

== Career ==
Almeida first competed for Cape Verde at the 2000 IAAF World Cross Country Championships in Vilamoura, Portugal where she placed 118th in the Women's short race in a time of 18:33. The following year at the 2001 IAAF World Indoor Championships in Lisbon, Almeida recorded a personal best and national record time of 11:37.38 in the heats of the 3000 metres. Five months later at the World Outdoor Championships in Edmonton, Lopes placed 35th in the 1500 metres with a time of 5:13.80. The following year at the 2002 African Championships in Athletics in Radès, Tunisia, she finished last in the 1500 metres but with an improved time of 4:56.92. In 2003, Lopes competed in the 2003 IAAF World Half Marathon Championships in Vilamoura, finishing in 59th in 1:24:59 and in the marathon at the 2003 World Championships, finishing in last place in 3:21:59. Two years later she was back on track running the 1500 metres in 4:51.29 at the 2005 World Championships in Helsinki.

=== Personal bests ===
Below is Euclides Lopes' personal best times.

Event	Time	Venue	Date	Records	Notes
800 metres	2:29.73	Macerata, Italy	25 September 2011		
1500 metres	4:33.81	Villafranca di Verona, Italy	30 June 2007	NR	
3000 metres	9:43.83	Bussolengo, Italy	6 June 2009		
3000 metres (indoor)	11:37.38	Lisbon, Portugal	9 March 2001	NR	
5000 metres	17:13.49	Rovereto, Italy	29 June 2012		
10,000 metres	36:34.13	Treviso, Italy	18 April 2010		
3000 metres steeplechase	10:45.75	Pordenone, Italy	4 July 2009		
5 km (road)	17:54	Bolzano, Italy	31 December 2011		
10 km (road)	36:45	Gualtieri, Italy	12 April 2004		
10 mi (road)	1:00:01	San Giovanni Lupatoto, Italy	7 February 2010		
Half marathon	1:17:55	Brugnera, Italy	21 March 2010		
Marathon	2:57:30	Verona, Italy	6 October 2013		
