= Kristina da Fonseca-Wollheim =

Polish sprinter

Kristina da Fonseca-Wollheim (born 10 February 1972) is a German middle- and long-distance runner who specialized in the 1500, 3000 and 5000 metres.

She finished fourth at the 1992 IAAF World Cup (1500 m), thirteenth at the 1997 World Indoor Championships (3000 m), second at the 1997 European Cup (3000 m), second at the 1998 European Cup (5000 m), seventh at the 1998 European Indoor Championships (3000 m), ninth at the 1998 European Championships (5000 m) and third at the 2000 European Cup (1500 m).

She also competed at the 1991 European Junior Championships (1500 m, did not start in the final) and the 1997 World Championships (5000 m) without reaching the final. She also finished 32nd in the 2000 World Cross Country Championships short race. A major goal was the 2000 Summer Olympics, which she did not reach.

She competed regularly in IAAF Golden League meets from the mid-1990s, and finished fifth at the 1999 IAAF Grand Prix final (1500 m). Her last elite meet was the 2002 Golden Gala.

On the domestic level, she became German champion in the 1500 metres in 1998 and 1999, also taking three silver and two bronze. She became German champion in the 5000 metres in 1997 and 1998, also taking one silver. She became German indoor champion in the 3000 metres in 1997 and 2002, and took three national indoor silver medals in the 1500 metres. She represented the clubs LG Offenburg, LAC Quelle Fürth, SV Halle/Saale and LG Eintracht Frankfurt.

Her personal best times were 2:00.86 minutes in the 800 metres, achieved in July 1997 in Stuttgart; 4:01.42 minutes in the 1500 metres, achieved in July 1998 in Rome; 8:37.30 minutes in the 3000 metres, achieved in September 1999 in Brussels; and 14:58.43 minutes in the 5000 metres, achieved in September 1999 in Berlin.
