= Sonia O'Sullivan =

Irish athlete (born 1969)

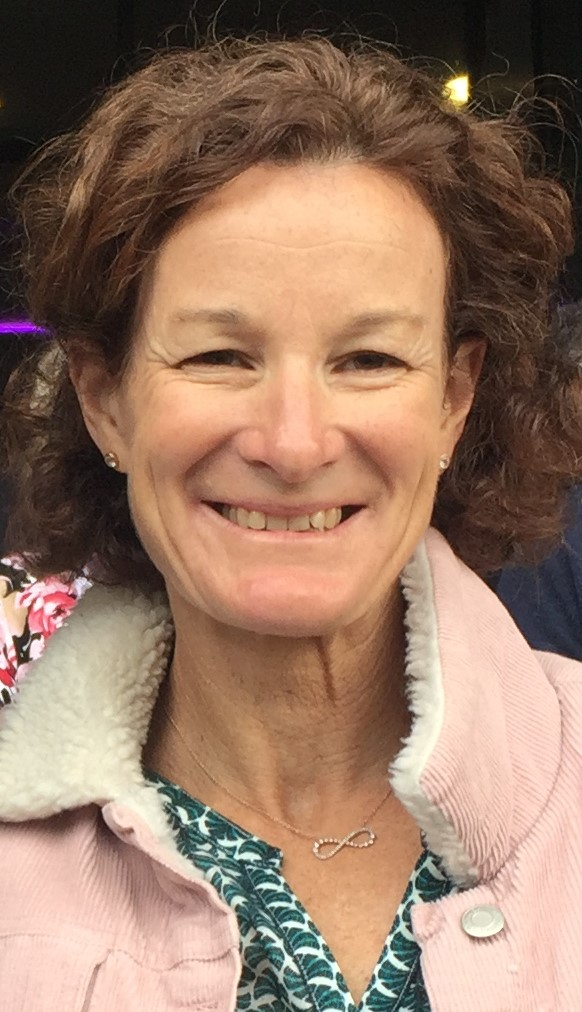
- O'Sullivan in 2017

Personal information
- Born: 28 November 1969 (age 56) Cobh, County Cork, Ireland
- Relative: Sophie O'Sullivan (daughter)
Medal record
Women's athletics
Representing Ireland
Olympic Games
| Silver medal – second place | 2000 Sydney | 5000 m |
World Championships
| Gold medal – first place | 1995 Gothenburg | 5000 m |
| Silver medal – second place | 1993 Stuttgart | 1500 m |
European Championships
| Gold medal – first place | 1994 Helsinki | 3000 m |
| Gold medal – first place | 1998 Budapest | 5000 m |
| Gold medal – first place | 1998 Budapest | 10,000 m |
| Silver medal – second place | 2002 Munich | 5000 m |
| Silver medal – second place | 2002 Munich | 10,000 m |
World Cross-Country Championships
| Gold medal – first place | 1998 Marrakesh | 8 km |
| Gold medal – first place | 1998 Marrakesh | 4 km |
| Bronze medal – third place | 1997 Turin | Team 8 km |
| Bronze medal – third place | 2002 Dublin | Team 4 km |
World Indoor Championships
| Silver medal – second place | 1997 Paris | 3000 m |
Summer Universiade
| Gold medal – first place | 1991 Sheffield | 1500 m |
| Silver medal – second place | 1991 Sheffield | 3000 m |
World Cup
| Gold medal – first place | 1998 Johannesburg | 5000 m |

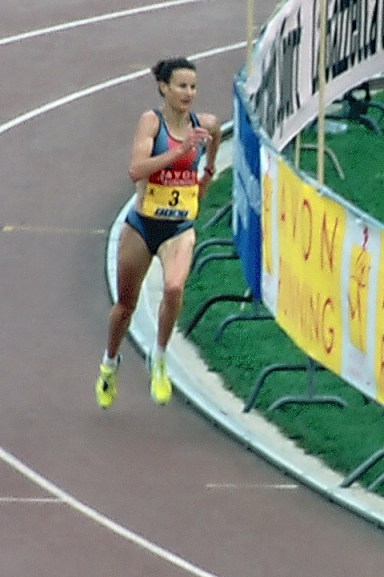
Sonia O'Sullivan in 2000

Sonia O'Sullivan (born 28 November 1969) is an Irish former track and field athlete. She won a gold medal in the 5000 metres at the 1995 World Championships and a silver medal in the 5000 metres at the 2000 Olympic Games. Her 2000 m world record of 5:25.36, set in 1994, stood until 2017.

O'Sullivan first came to prominence when winning the 1500 m at the 1991 Universiade, before going on to finish fourth in the 3000 m final at the 1992 Olympic Games. She then won a silver medal in the 1500 m at the 1993 World Championships. She was favourite for the 5000 m title at the 1996 Olympic Games but dropped out of the final due to illness. As well as her 1995 World title, she won three gold medals at the European Championships, in the 3000 m (1994), 5000 m (1998) and 10,000 m (1998), and is a two-time World Cross Country Champion.

O'Sullivan won silver medals in the 5000 m and 10,000 m at the 2002 European Championships and competed at her fourth Olympic Games in 2004. She is known for her fast kick, clocking 28-second final 200 m splits in some of her races.

She is one of two women who won the short and long course World Cross Country title at the same championship (1998 in Marrakesh).

== Early career ==
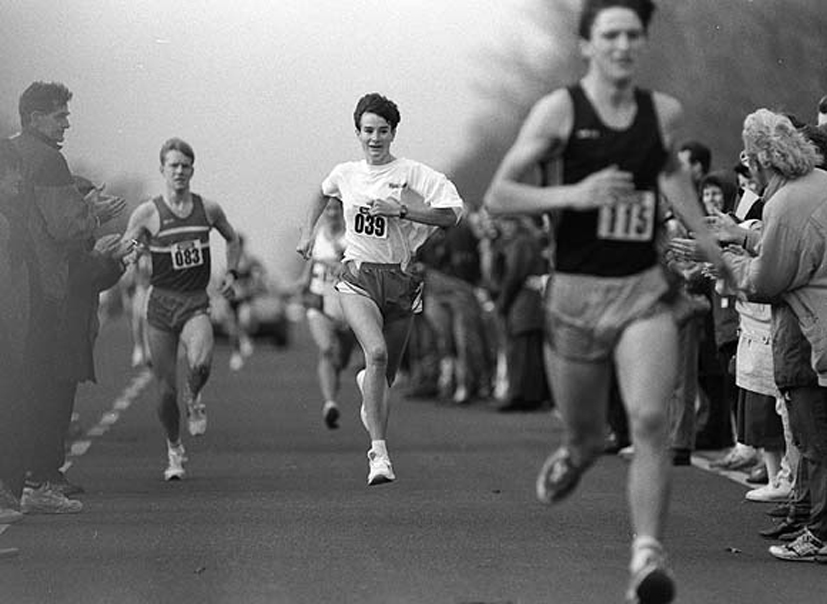
O'Sullivan wearing no. 39 in the Oman Cup Race in Dublin, 1992.

Born in Cobh, County Cork, O'Sullivan was educated at St Marys National School Cobh and Cobh Community College. She completed her leaving certificate in 1987. O'Sullivan's first major international competition was the 1990 European Championships at Split, where she finished 11th in the 3000 m. However, O'Sullivan improved quickly after that, and on 26 January the following year, at Boston, she set a new world indoor record in the 5000 m of 15:17.28, taking more than 5 seconds off the old record. At the time, O'Sullivan (who attained a sporting scholarship) was studying accountancy at Villanova University in the US, and at the World Student Games at Sheffield in July 1991, she won the 1500 m gold medal in 4:12.14, and the silver medal in the 3000 m in 8:56.55. At the start of 1992, she finished 7th in the World Cross Country Championships.

She won the Honda Sports Award as the nation's top female cross-country runner in 1991–92.

In 1992, O'Sullivan improved her personal bests in a number of distances between 800 m and 5000 m, setting six Irish national records in the process, including five in the space of 11 days in mid-August following the Barcelona Olympic Games. At Barcelona, in the 3000 m final, O'Sullivan was always in contention and hit the lead in the back straight on the final lap, but she was eventually outsprinted and finished fourth. Narrowly missing out on an Olympic medal was made all the more frustrating when the silver medalist from the race Tatyana Dorovskikh tested positive for a banned substance the following year. In the 1500 m, she finished only 11th in her semi-final and did not qualify for the final. She finished 1992 by winning the Grand Prix Final for the 5000 m.

== 1993–1995 ==
=== 1993 ===
In 1993, O'Sullivan established herself as one of the world's top middle-distance runners. By the time the World Championships came around, she was the clear favourite for both the 3000 m and 1500 m. However her hopes in the 3000 m were dashed by the performances of three Chinese athletes who would later in the year go on to smash the world record multiple times. The winner, Qu Yunxia, finished in a championship record of 8:28.71, with Zhang Linli and Zhang Lirong following in second and third respectively. A month later Qu would go on to set a 1500 m world record of 3:50.46. O'Sullivan finished the race 4th in a time of 8:33.8. Six days later she won the silver medal in the 1500 m in a time of 4:03.48, again behind a Chinese athlete. Five days after the championships, at the ISTAF meet in Berlin, O'Sullivan recorded the season's best time over 5000 m of 14:45.92, which moved her to third on the all-time world list. Soon afterwards she closed the year by winning the Grand Prix Final for the 3000 m and finished 2nd in the Mile. She finished the Grand Prix season in 2nd place in the Women's Overall competition.

=== 1994 ===
During 1994, O'Sullivan dominated international distance running. She set the fastest time of the year in four events, the 1500 m, 1 mile, 2000 m and 3000 m, and the second fastest time in the 5000 m. On 8 July, at Edinburgh, she broke the 2000 m world record, setting a new time of 5:25.36. This record stood until Genzebe Dibaba of Ethiopia broke it on 7 February 2017. The next week, in London, she broke the European record for the 3000 m, beating Britain's Yvonne Murray, and setting the year's fastest time of 8:21.64. This moved her to fifth on the all-time world list, behind the four Chinese runners who had set their personal bests at the 1993 National Championships in Beijing. This record lasted until 2002, when Gabriela Szabo bettered it. Only three days later, at Nice, O'Sullivan recorded the year's fastest 1500 m, a personal best, of 3:59.10, and only four days after that, she won the mile at the Bislett Games in Oslo, in a time of 4:17.25. This was the season's best, and it moved O'Sullivan to fourth on the all-time world list. All four of these times were also new Irish records, and after this two-week period of record-breaking, O'Sullivan became a clear favourite to win any event she chose to compete in at the European Athletics Championships in Helsinki in August. At Helsinki, O'Sullivan elected to only contest the 3000 m, with her main opposition expected to come from Yvonne Murray. In the final, on 10 August, Murray set the pace with O'Sullivan on her shoulder. With 200 m to go, O'Sullivan surged past Murray to win easily in 8:31.84. O'Sullivan followed this with a win over 5000 m in the Grand Prix final in Paris on 3 September. She finished the Grand Prix season in 3rd place in the Women's Overall standings. At the end of a long season, on 9 September, the tired O'Sullivan finished only fifth in the 1500 m at the World Cup in London.

=== 1995 ===
O'Sullivan continued to dominate international distance running in 1995. As she had done in 1994, O'Sullivan set the fastest time of the year in four events, the 1500 m, 1 mile, 2000 m and 3000 m, and the second fastest time in the 5000 m. O'Sullivan was the winner of 11 of the 12 races in which she competed over 1500 m or 1 mile in 1995. These victories included the only sub-4-minute 1500 m time recorded during the year, a new Irish record of 3:58.85 set at the Herculis meet in Monaco on 25 July. In the 3000 m, O'Sullivan was clearly in a class above her rivals, winning all five of her races, and producing four of the six fastest times, including the year's fastest time of 8:27.57 at the Weltklasse meet in Zürich on 16 August. Her other 3000 m victories included the Bislett Games in Oslo on 21 July, and the Grand Prix final in Monaco on 9 September. O'Sullivan was left with the dilemma leading up to the World Championships at Gothenburg, of whether to compete in the 1500 m or the 5000 m. She had been unbeaten at 5000 m before Gothenburg, although the fastest time of the year, a new world record, had been set by Portugal's Fernanda Ribeiro. In the end, O'Sullivan chose the 5000 m, and, after easily winning her heat on 10 August, she kicked clear of Ribeiro in the final two days later, to win the world title in 14:46.47. Three weeks later, on 1 September, at the ISTAF meeting in Berlin, O'Sullivan again battled over 5000 m with the new world record holder Ribeiro, and again O'Sullivan was victorious, winning in a time of 14:41.40, a new Irish record, and the third fastest 5000 m of all time. For the fourth year in a row, she won the Grand Prix Final, this time over 3000 m.

== 1996–1997 ==
Although she was not as dominant as she had been in 1994 and 1995, Sonia O'Sullivan continued to be a major force in 1996 at the distances between 1500 m and 5000 m. Her best event in 1996 was the 3000 m, where she was unbeaten for the third successive year, winning all five of her races. O'Sullivan produced the early season leading time of 8:42.40 in Eugene on 26 May, and then at Nice, on 10 July, she recorded the year's fastest time of 8:35.42. In the 1500 m, only two women broke 4 minutes during the year, one of whom was O'Sullivan, who clocked her best time of 3:59.91 when winning at the Bislett Games in Oslo on 5 July. In terms of preparation for the Olympic Games held later that year in Atlanta, O'Sullivan's best event appeared to be the 5000 m, the distance at which she was the reigning world champion. On 5 June, at the Golden Gala meet in Rome, O'Sullivan won in 14:54.75. A month later, on 12 July, at the Securicor Games in London, she beat a strong field to win in 14:48.36. The program at the Olympic Games in Atlanta was sufficiently scheduled to allow O'Sullivan to contest both the 5000 m and 1500 m events. Her early season form and world title the previous year had made her one of the favourites for the 5000 m; however, news of double-world record holder Wang Junxia competing made many observers revise their opinion. In the heats everything seemed on track when she easily won her heat in 15:15.80. However, in the final on 28 July, she was badly affected by a stomach upset, and after starting well gradually faded away and failed to finish. The race was won by 3000 and 10,000 m world record holder Wang Junxia of China. Her disappointment continued in the 1500 m, where, still weakened, she came second last in her heat and failed to qualify for the semi-finals.

O'Sullivan competed in her first indoor competition for five years at the IAAF World Indoor Championships in Athletics in Paris in March 1997. Prior to that meeting, O'Sullivan had travelled to Australia to get some early season competition in the Australian domestic outdoor season. O'Sullivan recorded her best result in Canberra, on 11 January, where she won a 5000 m race in 15:10.98. She had entered both the 1500 m and 3000 m at the World Indoors, but eventually, she chose to only contest the 3000 m event. In the final, on 8 March, O'Sullivan hit the lead in the last lap, but she was overtaken by Romanian Gabriela Szabo who went on to narrowly defeat O'Sullivan in 8:45.75 compared to the Irishwoman's second-place time of 8:46.19. At the World Cross Country Championships, she finished 9th but helped Ireland win the bronze medal in the Team Event. O'Sullivan had an indifferent outdoor season in 1997, and her best time of 8:53.53 over 3000 m, which she achieved in Paris on 25 June, was 7 seconds slower than the time she had set indoors in March. Similarly, her best performance at 5000 m for the year remained the time she had set in Australia in January. At the World Championships held in Athens, O'Sullivan produced her best 1500 m time of the year of 4:05.31 when she finished fourth in her semi-final on 3 August. In the final, held two days later, O'Sullivan was never a serious threat, and she finished 8th in 4:07.81. O'Sullivan had even greater disappointment in the 5000 m where she was the defending world champion, finishing only 7th in her heat and failing to qualify for the final.

== 1998–1999 ==
O'Sullivan made an impressive comeback in 1998. At the World Cross-Country Championships at Marrakesh in March, she entered both the short course (4 km) and long course (8 km) events. On successive days, O'Sullivan won both events, and her 4 km time of 12:20 was 14 seconds ahead of her nearest rival. O'Sullivan continued this form into the track season, where her performances in the 1500 m, 3000 m and 5000 m were close to those she had produced at her peak in 1994 and 1995.

At the European Athletics Championships in Budapest, the 1500 m and 5000 m finals, events at which O'Sullivan usually doubled at major championships, were scheduled to be run on the same day, thus denying her the opportunity of competing in both events. Undeterred, O'Sullivan entered the 5000 m and 10,000 m, having never run the latter event before on the track. In the 10,000 m final, on 19 August, she shadowed the leaders, and then produced an astonishing 28.1 second final 200 metres to win the gold medal in 31:29.33 in her debut at the distance. Four days later, in the more familiar territory of the 5000 m, the pace was set by Romanian Gabriela Szabo, but again, O'Sullivan produced an explosive finishing sprint to defeat Szabo in 15:06.50. At the World Cup held the following month in Johannesburg, O'Sullivan won her second major international 5000 m competition of the year, again sprinting clear of the opposition following a very slow pace. She concluded her year by winning the Great North Run.

O'Sullivan took a break from competition for most of 1999, during which time she gave birth to her daughter, Ciara, on 10 July 1999. O'Sullivan returned to training 10 days after her daughter's birth, and on 10 October, finished a half marathon in 70:05.

On 17 October, O'Sullivan won the Bupa Loughrea Run 99, in Loughrea, Co Galway with a world record 5 mi finishing time of 24:27.

== 2000–2002 ==
With the prospect of competing at her third Olympic Games in September 2000 in Sydney, O'Sullivan competed in the Australian domestic outdoor season during the European winter, recording a fastest time over 5000 m of 15:10.24 at Sydney on 13 February 2000. Back in Europe, she won the Dublin Women's Mini Marathon in June, before producing a number of quality performances on the track in her preparation for the Olympics. The Weltklasse meet in Zürich on 11 August produced the finest 3000 m race of the year, with the first six placings registering the six fastest times of 2000. O'Sullivan finished a close second in this race to Romanian Gabriela Szabo in a time of 8:27.58. At Sydney, on 22 September, O'Sullivan won her 5000 m heat with a season's best of 15:07.91. In the final three days later, after an enthralling sprint finish, O'Sullivan won the silver medal behind Szabo in a National Record 14:41.02. She became only the second Irish woman to win an Olympic Medal, after Michelle Smith and the first Irish Track and Field Olympic Medalist since John Treacy took silver in Los Angeles in 1984. In the 10,000 m final, held on 30 September, O'Sullivan set another personal best and national record when finishing sixth in 30:53.37 performance. Shortly after the Olympics, she won the Grand Prix Final 3000 m. Following the Olympics, O'Sullivan made her marathon debut, winning the Dublin marathon in a time of 2:35:42 on 30 October.

In March 2001, O'Sullivan decided to compete in the World Indoor Championships. She finished 7th in the 3000 m and 9th in the 1500 m. After this she took a break from athletics to give birth to her second daughter, Sophie.

O'Sullivan returned in March 2002 for the World Cross Country Championships, being held in Dublin. She finished a respectable 7th in the Short Race, and led Ireland to Team Bronze. At the European Championships in Munich later that year, O'Sullivan attempted a defence of the two European golds she had won in 1998. In the 10,000 m she won silver in a national record of 30:47.59. O'Sullivan admitted she had been outclassed in the race by Paula Radcliffe, saying that only world record holder Wang Junxia could have beaten the British girl on the night. A few days later, O'Sullivan added a second silver in the 5000 m as she was beaten into second place by Marta Dominguez of Spain in a time of 15:14.85. Shortly afterwards she set a season's best for the 3000 m in Zürich as she finished third in a time of 8:33.62. A week later, she ran her fastest 5000 m time since her Olympic silver in London in a time of 14:46.97, as she finished third. She ended an excellent season by winning her second Great North Run title in a national record time of 67:19.

== 2003–2009 ==
After an impressive 2002 season, O'Sullivan had a disappointing 2003. She started well with a win at the newly inaugurated Great Ireland Run, but she struggled during the summer Grand Prix races. However, she appeared to be finding her form at the right time when she ran a season's best in the 3000 m in Zürich in a time of 8:37.55 on 15 August. At the World Championships in Paris later that month she was considered a possible medalist. She qualified very comfortably from her heat. However, in the final, she finished last of the 15 starters. In December she finished an impressive fourth at the European Cross-Country Championships and led Ireland to silver in the team event.

2004 was to be an even more disappointing season for O'Sullivan. She struggled to find her best form throughout the year. At the Olympic Games in Athens, she qualified for the final of the 5000 m. However, in the final, O'Sullivan, who was suffering from an illness, finished last of the 14 finishers, well over a lap behind the winner Meseret Defar. She was given a hero's reception by the crowd as she completed her last lap. It was one of the more poignant moments of the 2004 Games. In November, O'Sullivan finished an impressive 4th in the World Half-Marathon Championship in Delhi.

In April 2005, O'Sullivan ran the London Marathon for the first time and finished 8th in a personal best time of 2:29:01. In June she won Dublin's Women's Mini Marathon for the second time. However, an injury kept her out of the 2005 World Championships in Helsinki.

In January 2006, O'Sullivan applied for dual citizenship, which would allow her to compete for both Ireland and Australia. This request was granted and she intended to represent Australia at the 2006 Commonwealth Games in Melbourne, but to represent Ireland in all other competitions. She was chosen for the Australian Commonwealth Games team for the 5000 m. However, she wasn't able to compete due to a hamstring injury.

On 14 February 2007, O'Sullivan said she planned to retire after the Great Ireland Run on 15 April, having said the previous year that she planned to run competitively until the 2012 Olympics in London. She later confirmed that she would retire at the end of the 2007 season.

In March 2008, O'Sullivan was appointed team manager of the Australian team for the 2008 IAAF World Cross Country Championships in Edinburgh, Scotland. In 2009, she ran the Cork City Marathon,

The Statue to Sonia O'Sullivan in her hometown of Cobh, Ireland

== 2010–present ==
In 2012, O'Sullivan carried the Olympic flame when it arrived in Dublin on 6 June. She carried the flame onto St Stephen's Green and lit an Olympic cauldron. O'Sullivan was made chef de mission for Team Ireland at the 2012 Olympic Games.

O'Sullivan completed the 2013 Ealing Half Marathon in 1:27:28.

== Personal life ==
O'Sullivan's father John played as a goalkeeper for Cobh Ramblers football team. He had been in the Irish Navy. Her mother Mary died in 2023.

O'Sullivan is married to Nic Bideau and lives in Melbourne, Australia. Together they have two daughters, Ciara and Sophie. The latter won a silver medal in the 800 metres at the 2018 European Athletics U18 Championships in Győr, Hungary, 1500 metres gold at the 2023 European Athletics U23 Championships in Espoo, Finland, and 1500 metres gold at the 2024 Irish National Athletics Championships.

O'Sullivan has written two books: Running To Stand Still published in 2001 and Sonia My Story in 2008.

She frequently commentates for RTÉ during World and European Championship Athletics.

== Personal bests ==
- 800 metres – 2:00.69 (July 1987)
- 1000 metres – 2:34:66 (July 1993)
- 1500 metres – 3:58.85 (July 1995)
- Mile run – 4:17.25 NR (July 1994)
- 2000 metres – 5:25.36 NR (WR 1994–2017) (July 1994)
- 3000 metres – 8:21.64 NR (ER 1994–2002) (July 1994)
- 2 miles – 9:19.56 NR (WR 1998–2007) (June 1998)
- 5000 metres – 14:41.02 NR (September 2000)
- 10,000 metres – 30:47.59 NR (August 2002)
- 10 miles road – 51:00.00 WB (8 September 2002)
- Half marathon – 67:19 (October 2002)
- Marathon – 2:29:01 (April 2005)

== International competitions ==
| Year | Competition | Venue | Position | Event | Time | Notes |
Representing Ireland
| 1988 | World Junior Championships | Sudbury, Canada | Heats | 3000 m | 9:50.31 | |
| 1990 | European Championships | Split, Yugoslavia | 11th | 3000 m | 8:51:33 | |
| 1991 | Universiade | Sheffield, United Kingdom | 1st | 1500 m | 4:12.14 | |
| 1991 | Universiade | Sheffield, United Kingdom | 2nd | 3000 m | 8:56.35 | |
| 1992 | Olympic Games | Barcelona, Spain | 4th | 3000 m | 8:47.41 | |
| 1993 | World Championships | Stuttgart, Germany | 2nd | 1500 m | 4:03.48 | |
| 1993 | World Championships | Stuttgart, Germany | 4th | 3000 m | 8:33.38 | |
| 1994 | European Championships | Helsinki, Finland | 1st | 3000 m | 8:31.84 | |
| 1994 | World Cup | London, United Kingdom | 5th | 1500 m | 4:12.30 | |
| 1995 | World Championships | Gothenburg, Sweden | 1st | 5000 m | 14:46.47 | CR |
| 1996 | Olympic Games | Atlanta, United States | Heats | 1500 m | 4:19.77 | |
| 1996 | Olympic Games | Atlanta, United States | — | 5000 m | DNF | |
| 1997 | World Indoor Championships | Paris, France | 2nd | 3000 m | 8:46.19 | NR |
| 1997 | World Cross Country Championships | Turin, Italy | 9th | 6.6 km | 21:25 | |
| 1997 | World Championships | Athens, Greece | 8th | 1500 m | 4:07.81 | |
| 1997 | World Championships | Athens, Greece | Heats | 5000 m | 15:40.82 | |
| 1998 | World Cross Country Championships | Marrakesh, Morocco | 1st | 4 km | 12:20 | |
| 1998 | World Cross Country Championships | Marrakesh, Morocco | 1st | 8 km | 25:39 | |
| 1998 | European Championships | Budapest, Hungary | 1st | 5000 m | 15:06.50 | CR |
| 1998 | European Championships | Budapest, Hungary | 1st | 10,000 m | 31:29.33 | |
| 1998 | World Cup | Johannesburg, South Africa | 1st | 5000 m | 16:24.52 | |
| 2000 | World Cross Country Championships | Vilamoura, Portugal | 15th | 4.18 km | 13:23 | |
| 2000 | World Cross Country Championships | Vilamoura, Portugal | 7th | 8.08 km | 26:20 | |
| 2000 | Olympic Games | Sydney, Australia | 2nd | 5000 m | 14:41.02 | NR |
| 2000 | Olympic Games | Sydney, Australia | 6th | 10,000 m | 30:53.37 | NR |
| 2001 | World Indoor Championships | Lisbon, Portugal | 9th | 1500 m | 4:19.40 | |
| 2001 | World Indoor Championships | Lisbon, Portugal | 7th | 3000 m | 8:44.37 | NR |
| 2001 | World Cross Country Championships | Ostend, Belgium | — | 4.1 km | DNF | |
| 2002 | World Cross Country Championships | Dublin, Ireland | 7th | 4.208 km | 13:55 | |
| 2002 | World Half Marathon Championships | Brussels, Belgium | 14th | Half marathon | 1:10:04 | PB |
| 2002 | European Championships | Munich, Germany | 2nd | 5000 m | 15:14.85 | SB |
| 2002 | European Championships | Munich, Germany | 2nd | 10,000 m | 30:47.59 | NR |
| 2003 | World Championships | Paris, France | 15th | 5000 m | 15:36.62 | |
| 2003 | European Cross Country Championships | Edinburgh, United Kingdom | 4th | 6.595 km | 22:36 | |
| 2004 | Olympic Games | Athens, Greece | 14th | 5000 m | 16:20.90 | |
| 2004 | World Half Marathon Championships | New Delhi, India | 4th | Half marathon | 1:10:33 | |

== See also ==
- List of people on the postage stamps of Ireland

Awards
| Preceded by (United States) Jackie Joyner-Kersee | Women's Track & Field Athlete of the Year; 1995 | Succeeded by (Russia) Svetlana Masterkova |
Sporting positions
| Preceded by (China) Wang Junxia | Women's 3,000 m Best Year Performance; 1994–1996 | Succeeded by (Romania) Gabriela Szabo |
| Preceded by (South Africa) Elana Meyer | Women's 5,000 m Best Year Performance; 1993 | Succeeded by (Russia) Yelena Romanova |
Olympic Games
| Preceded by Francie Barrett | Flagbearer for Ireland; Sydney 2000 | Succeeded by Niall Griffin |
