= 1998 German Athletics Championships =

- Dates: 3–5 July 1998
- Host city: Berlin, Germany
- Venue: Friedrich-Ludwig-Jahn-Sportpark
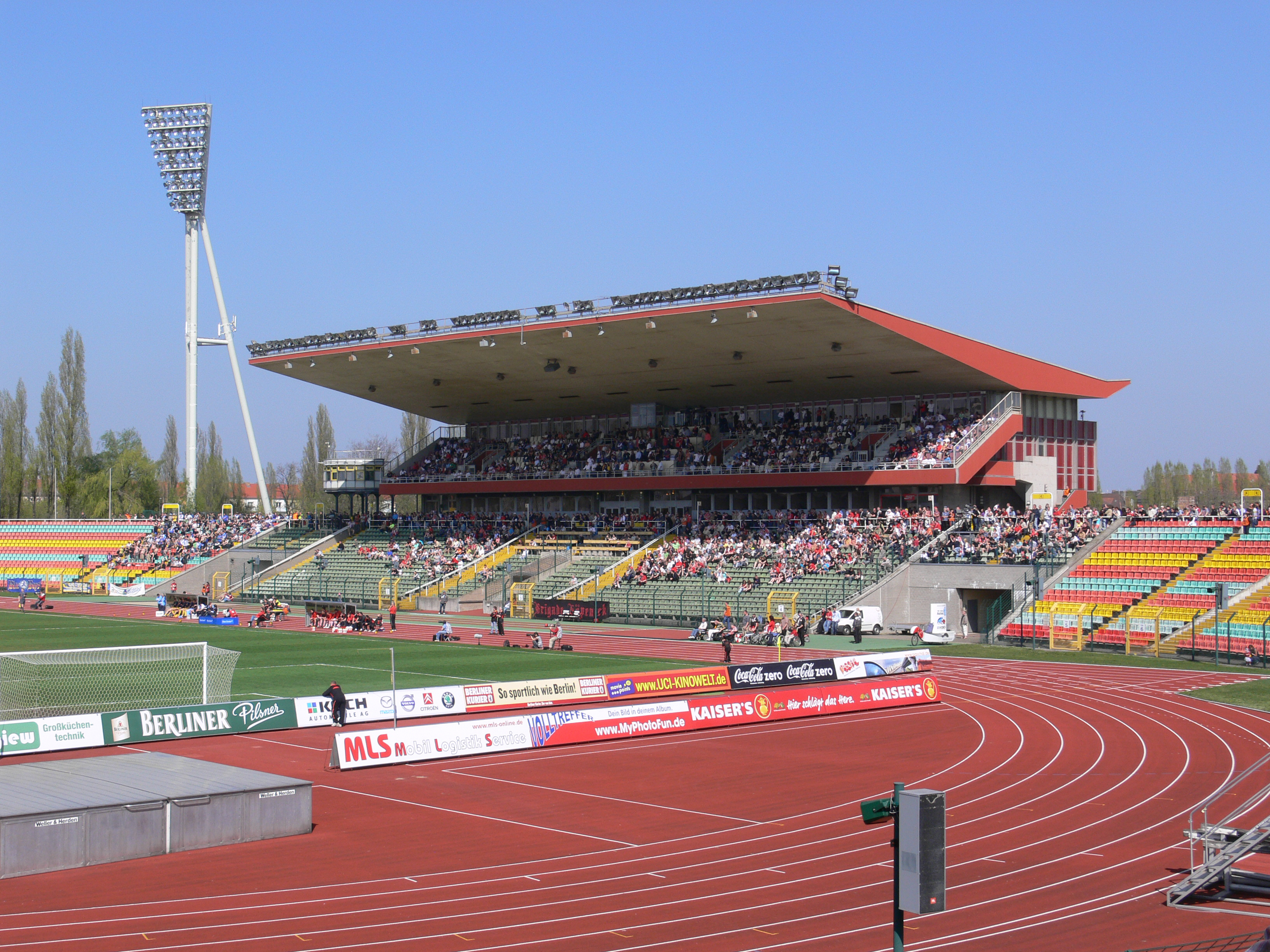
- Records set: 2 Championship Records

The 1998 German Athletics Championships were held at the Friedrich-Ludwig-Jahn-Sportpark in Berlin on 3–5 July 1998.

== Results ==
=== Men ===
Event	Gold	
100 m	Marc Blume	10.58
200 m	Daniel Bittner	20.82
400 m	Stefan Letzelter	46.49
800 m	Nico Motchebon	1:47.99
1500 m	Dieter Baumann	3:42.00
5000 m	Dieter Baumann	13:20.56
110 m hurdles	Falk Balzer	13.27
400 m hurdles	Thomas Goller	50.38
3000 m steeplechase	Damian Kallabis	8:24.62
Triple jump	Charles Friedek	17.27
Long jump	Konstantin Krause	7.93
High jump	Martin Buß	2.30
Pole vault	Tim Lobinger	5.92
Shot put	Oliver-Sven Buder	20.15
Discus throw	Lars Riedel	65.42
Hammer throw	Heinz Weis	79.74
Javelin throw	Boris Henry	88.62
4 × 100 m relay	MTG Mannheim I Schäfer; Crews; Schofer; Weimer	39.51
4 × 400 m relay	Bayer 04 Leverkusen I Oblong; Bittner; Ehrnsperger; Voelkel	3:07.51

=== Women ===
Event	Gold	
100 m	Andrea Philipp	11.24
200 m	Melanie Paschke	22.72
400 m	Uta Rohländer	51.75
800 m	Claudia Gesell	2:03.24
1500 m	Kristina da Fonseca-Wollheim	4:19.58
5000 m	Kristina da Fonseca-Wollheim	15:28.65
100 m hurdles	Caren Sonn	13.20
400 m hurdles	Silvia Rieger	55.58
Triple jump	Petra Lobinger	13.47
Long jump	Heike Drechsler	6.94
High jump	Alina Astafei	1.88
Pole vault	Sabine Schulte	4.25
Shot put	Nadine Kleinert	18.30
Discus throw	Franka Dietzsch	63.62
Hammer throw	Simone Mathes	64.87
Javelin throw	Tanja Damaske	70.10
4 × 100 m relay	LG Olympia Dortmund I Breitbach; Brodbeck; Seidel; Andrea Philipp	45.10
4 × 400 m relay	SC Magdeburg I Ivonne Teichmann; Ulrike Urbansky; Hauke; Grit Breuer	3:34.45
