= Athletics at the 1998 Asian Games – Women's 5000 metres =

Women's 5000 metres at the 1998 Asian Games
- Venue: Thammasat Stadium
- Dates: 18 December 1998
- Competitors: 12 from 11 nations

Medalists
gold medal	Supriyati Sutono	Indonesia
silver medal	Sunita Rani	India
bronze medal	Michiko Shimizu	Japan

The women's 5000 metres competition at the 1998 Asian Games in Bangkok, Thailand was held on 18 December at the Thammasat Stadium. This was the first time that this event was contested at the Asian Games replacing the 3000 metres.

== Schedule ==
All times are Indochina Time (UTC+07:00)

Date	Time	Event
Friday, 18 December 1998	16:10	Final

== Results ==
Rank	Athlete	Time	Notes
1st place, gold medalist(s)	Supriyati Sutono (INA)	15:54.45	GR
2nd place, silver medalist(s)	Sunita Rani (IND)	15:54.47	
3rd place, bronze medalist(s)	Michiko Shimizu (JPN)	15:55.36	
4	Wang Chunmei (CHN)	15:58.21	
5	Megumi Tanaka (JPN)	16:08.14	
6	Maggie Chan (HKG)	16:26.03	
7	Hong Myong-hui (PRK)	16:50.87	
8	Keshani Samarakoon (SRI)	17:44.93	
9	Zainab Bakkour (SYR)	17:56.63	
10	Viliwan Kaampitak (THA)	18:29.05	
11	Anna Markelowa (TKM)	18:54.49	
12	Kanchhi Maya Koju (NEP)	18:56.12	
