= Lyudmila Biktasheva =

Russian long-distance runner

Lyudmila Marsovna Biktasheva (Cyrillic: Людмила Марсовна Бикташева; born 25 July 1974 in Kamensk-Uralsky) is a Russian athlete competing in the long-distance events. She represented her country at the 2000 Summer Olympics in the 10,000 metres finishing 13th in the final. She won the bronze medal in the same event at the 2002 European Championships.

== Competition record ==
Year	Competition	Venue	Position	Event	Notes
Representing Russia
1993	European Junior Championships	San Sebastián, Spain	3rd	10,000 m	34:28.04
1998	European Championships	Budapest, Hungary	10th	10,000 m	32:37.64
1999	World Half Marathon Championships	Palermo, Italy	9th	Half marathon	1:10:35
2000	Olympic Games	Sydney, Australia	13th	10,000 m	31:47.10
2001	World Championships	Edmonton, Canada	10th	10,000 m	32:18.64
2001	Goodwill Games	Brisbane, Australia	4th	10,000 m	31:54.06
2001	World Half Marathon Championships	Bristol, United Kingdom	13th	Half marathon	1:10:31
2002	European Championships	Munich, Germany	3rd	10,000 m	31:04.00
2003	World Half Marathon Championships	Vilamoura, Portugal	7th	Half marathon	1:10:31
2008	World Half Marathon Championships	Rio de Janeiro, Brazil	20th	Half marathon	1:14:33

== Personal bests ==
Outdoor

- 5000 metres – 15:22.98 (Yokohama 2000)
- 10,000 metres – 31:04.00 (Munich 2002)
- 10 kilometres – 32:04 (Cape Elizabeth 2008)
- 15 kilometres – 49:42 (Bristol 2001)
- Half marathon – 1:10:31 (Vilamoura 2003)
- Half marathon – 1:10:31 (Bristol 2001)
- Marathon – 2:29:57 (Baltimore 2011)

Indoor

- 3000 metres – 9:20.0 (Yekaterinburg 1998)

== See also ==
- List of European Athletics Championships medalists (women)
