= Natalya Gorelova =

Russian middle-distance runner

Personal information
- Born: 18 April 1973 (age 53) Moscow, Soviet Union

Sport
- Sport: Track and field
Medal record
Representing Russia
World Championships
Bronze medal – third place	2001 Edmonton	1500m
World Indoor Championships
Bronze medal – third place	2001 Lisbon	1500m

Natalya Borisovna Gorelova, née Natalya Zaytseva (born 18 April 1973) is a Russian middle-distance runner who specialized in the 1500 metres.

== International competitions ==
Year	Competition	Venue	Position	Event	Notes
Representing the Commonwealth of Independent States
1992	World Junior Championships	Seoul, South Korea	4th	800m	2:04.76
1992	World Junior Championships	Seoul, South Korea	7th (h)	4 × 400 m relay	3:39.01
Representing Russia
1999	World Championships	Seville, Spain	6th	800 m	1:57.90 PB
2001	World Indoor Championships	Lisbon, Portugal	3rd	1500 m	4:11.74
2001	World Championships	Edmonton, Canada	3rd	1500 m	4:02.40
2003	World Indoor Championships	Birmingham, United Kingdom	4th	1500 m	4:06.18
2003	World Athletics Final	Monte Carlo, Monaco	12th	1500 m	4:04.31

== Personal bests ==
- 800 metres - 1:57.90 min (1999)
- 1500 metres - 3:59.70 min (2001)
