= Elisa Rea =

Italian middle-distance runner

Personal information
- Nationality: Italian
- Born: 23 March 1968 (age 58) Roccasecca

Sport
- Country: Italy
- Sport: Athletics
- Event: Long-distance running
- Club: G.S. Forestale

Achievements and titles
- Personal bests: 3000 m indoor: 8:51.00 (1998); 5000 m: 15:26.50 (1999)
Medal record
World Military Championships
Silver medal – second place	1999 Zagreb	5000 m
Bronze medal – third place	1995 Rome	3000 m

Elisa Rea (born 23 March 1968) is a retired Italian athlete who competed in middle-distance events. She represented her country at two World Indoor Championships.

== Achievements ==
Year	Competition	Venue	Position	Event	Notes
Representing Italy
1991	Mediterranean Games	Athens, Greece	4th	1500 m	4:12.67
1992	European Indoor Championships	Genoa, Italy	9th (h)	1500 m	4:12.77
1993	World Indoor Championships	Toronto, Canada	11th (h)	1500 m	4:17.44
1993	Mediterranean Games	Narbonne, France	5th	1500 m	4:15.65
1993	Universiade	Buffalo, United States	5th	1500 m	4:14.92
1994	European Indoor Championships	Paris, France	–	3000 m	DNF
1995	World Indoor Championships	Barcelona, Spain	4th	3000 m	8:56.21
1995	Universiade	Fukuoka, Japan	5th	1500 m	4:14.09
1995	Military World Games	Rome, Italy	3rd	3000 m	8:59.03
1996	European Indoor Championships	Stockholm, Sweden	8th	3000 m	8:59.23
1997	Mediterranean Games	Bari, Italy	6th	800 m	2:06.27
1998	European Indoor Championships	Valencia, Spain	11th	3000 m	9:16.14
1999	Military World Games	Zagreb, Croatia	2nd	5000 m	15:32.67

== Personal bests ==
Outdoor

- 800 metres – 2:03.59 (Trento 1997)
- 1500 metres – 4:09.32 (Rome 1998)
- One mile – 4:30.03 (Rome 1993)
- 3000 metres – 8:48.76 (Rome 1999)
- 5000 metres – 15:26.50 (Pescara 1999)

Indoor

- 1500 metres – 4:11.49 (Genoa 1998)
- 3000 metres – 8:51.00 (Genoa 1998)
