= Michiko Shimizu (athlete) =

Japanese long-distance runner

Michiko Shimizu (志水 見千子, Shimizu Michiko; born 22 September 1970 in Amino, Kyoto) is a retired Japanese long-distance runner who mainly competed in the 5000 metres. She finished fourth at the 1996 Summer Olympics in Atlanta.

== Competition record ==
Year	Competition	Venue	Position	Event	Notes
Representing Japan
1995	World Championships	Gothenburg, Sweden	12th	5000 m	15:45.30
1996	Olympic Games	Atlanta, United States	4th	5000 m	15:09.05
1998	Asian Games	Bangkok, Thailand	3rd	5000 m	15:55.36
1999	World Championships	Seville, Spain	15th	5000 m	15:46.28
2000	Olympic Games	Sydney, Australia	33rd (h)	5000 m	15:48.20

== Personal bests ==
- 1500 metres – 4:13.00 (Brisbane 2000)
- 3000 metres – 8:52.06 (Tokyo 1994)
- 5000 metres – 15:09.05 (Atlanta 1996)
