= Yamna Oubouhou =

French long-distance runner

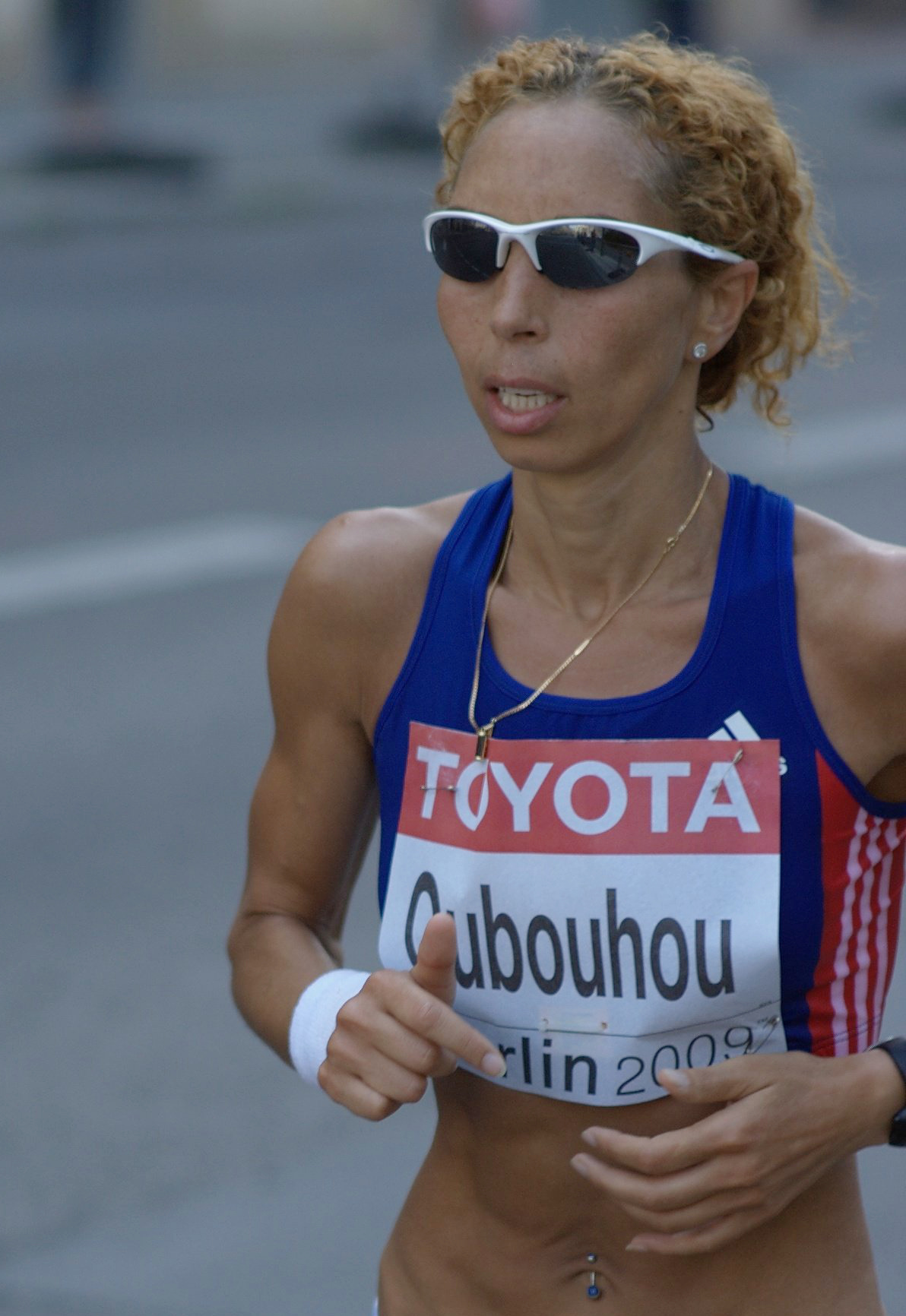

Yamna Oubouhou (formerly using the married name Belkacem; born 20 February 1974 in Hagou, Morocco) is a long-distance runner competing internationally for France. She first competed in the track events before moving up to the marathon.

== Competition record ==
Year	Competition	Venue	Position	Event	Notes
Representing France
1999	World Indoor Championships	Maebashi, Japan	4th	3000 m	8:41.63 min
1999	World Championships	Seville, Spain	8th	5000 m	15:03.47 min
2000	Olympic Games	Sydney, Australia	39th (h)	5000 m	16:08.49 min
2001	World Championships	Edmonton, Canada	8th	10,000 m	32:09.21 min
2004	World Half Marathon Championships	New Delhi, India	29th	Half marathon	1:15:53 h
2008	World Half Marathon Championships	Rio de Janeiro, Brazil	38th	Half marathon	1:18:39 h
2009	World Championships	Berlin, Germany	55th	Marathon	2:50:02 h

== Personal bests ==
Outdoor

- 1500 metres – 4:08.60 (Villeneuve-d'Ascq 1999)
- 2000 metres – 5:39.44 (Nancy 1999)
- 3000 metres – 8:38.13 (Oslo 1999)
- 5000 metres – 14:47.79 (Stockholm 2000)
- 10,000 metres – 32:05.98 (Villeneuve-d'Ascq 2001)
- 10 kilometres – 32:00 (La Courneuve 2001) NR
- Half marathon – 1:12:07 (Cannes 2008)
- Marathon – 2:31:56 (Paris 2008)

Indoor

- 2000 metres – 5:49.36 (Liévin 2000)
- 3000 metres – 8:41.63 (Maebashi 1999) NR
