= Estíbaliz Urrutia =

Spanish long-distance runner

Estíbaliz Urrutia González (born 22 February 1970, in Bilbao) is a retired Spanish long-distance runner who specialized in the 5000 metres.

She finished tenth in 3000 metres at the 1997 World Indoor Championships and thirteenth in 5000 metres at the 1998 European Championships. She also competed one edition of the World Cross Country Championships.

Her personal best times are:

- 800 metres - 2:07.73 min (1996)
- 1500 metres - 4:11.96 min (1996)
- 3000 metres - 9:01.68 min (1997, indoor)
- 5000 metres - 15:19.68 min (1998)
- Half marathon - 1:15:44 hrs (2000)
