= Amy Rudolph =

American runner

Amy Lynn Rudolph (born September 18, 1973) is an American retired middle- and long-distance runner who competed mostly in the 5000 meters. She represented her country at two consecutive Summer Olympics, starting in 1996, as well as four World Championships. She was born in Kane, Pennsylvania and attended Kane Area High School.

Competing for the Providence Friars, Rudolph won the 1994 NCAA Division I Outdoor Track and Field Championships in the 1500 metres. She also won that year's indoor championships in the mile run.

Amy was named associate head women's cross country coach/assistant track and field coach at Iowa State University in August 2018. Rudolph was named an assistant coach in track and field and cross country at Tennessee on August 19, 2024.

== Competition record ==
Year	Competition	Venue	Position	Event	Notes
Representing the United States
1996	Olympic Games	Atlanta, United States	10th	5000 m	15:19.77
1997	World Championships	Athens, Greece	27th (h)	5000 m	16:00.87
1999	World Championships	Seville, Spain	35th (h)	5000 m	16:24.31
2000	Olympic Games	Sydney, Australia	21st (h)	5000 m	15:28.91
2001	World Championships	Edmonton, Canada	29th (h)	5000 m	15:46.77
2005	World Championships	Helsinki, Finland	19th (h)	5000 m	15:32.76
