= Marina Bastos =

Portuguese runner

Marina Bastos Rodrigues (born 7 July 1971 in Albergaria-a-Velha) is a retired Portuguese athlete who specialised in the middle and long-distance events. She represented her country at three outdoor and four indoor World Championships.

== Competition record ==
Year	Competition	Venue	Position	Event	Notes
Representing Portugal
1990	World Junior Championships	Plovdiv, Bulgaria	10th	1500 m	4:20.92
1990	World Junior Championships	Plovdiv, Bulgaria	–	3000 m	DNF
1993	World Indoor Championships	Toronto, Canada	7th	3000 m	9:13.13
1994	European Indoor Championships	Paris, France	–	3000 m	DNF
1994	European Championships	Helsinki, Finland	–	3000 m	DNF
1995	World Indoor Championships	Barcelona, Spain	10th	3000 m	9:16.19
1995	World Championships	Gothenburg, Sweden	38th (h)	5000 m	16:16.78
1997	World Indoor Championships	Paris, France	4th	3000 m	8:52.64
1997	World Championships	Athens, Greece	–	10,000 m	DNF
1998	bero-American Championships	Lisbon, Portugal	7th	5000 m	16:31.38
1999	World Championships	Seville, Spain	24th (h)	5000 m	15:48.51
2001	World Indoor Championships	Lisbon, Portugal	–	3000 m	DNF
2002	European Championships	Munich, Germany	–	5000 m	DNF
2005	European Indoor Championships	Madrid, Spain	16th (h)	3000 m	9:25.64

== Personal bests ==
Outdoor

- 800 metres – 2:05.52 (1992)
- 1000 metres – 2:46.5 (1994)
- 1500 metres – 4:08.92 (Maia 1993)
- One mile – 4:38.00 (Leiria 1999)
- 3000 metres – 8:38.13 (Seville 1999)
- 5000 metres – 15:07.29 (Oslo 1997)
- 10,000 metres – 31:41.38 (Barakaldo 1999)
- 10 kilometres – 32:20 (Amadora 2004)
- Half marathon – 1:12:09 (1997)

Indoor

- 1500 metres – 4:28.62 (Braga 2007)
- 3000 metres – 8:49.55 (Lisbon 2001)
