= Amaia Piedra =

Spanish long-distance runner

Amaia Piedra (born 2 June 1972 in Bilbao) is a retired Spanish athlete who specialized in long-distance running.

She finished ninth over 3000 metres at the 2003 IAAF World Indoor Championships in Birmingham in an indoor personal best time of 8:59.76 minutes.

Piedra was suspended by the IAAF from June 2005 to June 2007 for an anti-doping rule violation. She'd tested positive for EPO.
