= Zhor El Kamch =

Moroccan long-distance runner

Zhor El Kamch (Arabic: زهور الكمش; born 15 March 1973 in Tiflet) is a Moroccan female long-distance runner who competes in distance from 3000 metres up to the marathon. She represented her country at the 2000 Summer Olympics.

== International competitions ==
Year	Competition	Venue	Position	Event	Notes
Representing Morocco
2000	World Cross Country Championships	Vilamoura, Portugal	9th	Short race	
2003	World Indoor Championships	Birmingham, United Kingdom	5th	3000 m	
2003	World Championships	Paris, France	14th	5000 m	
2003	World Athletics Final	Monte Carlo, Monaco	7th	3000 m	
2004	Rotterdam Marathon	Rotterdam, Netherlands	1st	Marathon	
2005	Mediterranean Games	Almería, Spain	1st	Half marathon	
2005	World Championships	Helsinki, Finland	—	Marathon	
2006	World Cross Country Championships	Fukuoka, Japan	7th	Short race	
2006	World Cross Country Championships	Fukuoka, Japan	4th	Team	

== Personal bests ==
- 1500 metres – 4:08.09 (1999)
- 3000 metres – 8:34.85 (2003)
- 5000 metres – 14:42.53 (2003)
- 10,000 metres – 33:01.29 (2001)
- Half marathon – 1:11:47 (2004)
- Marathon – 2:26:10 (2004)
