= Daniela Yordanova =

Bulgarian middle-distance runner

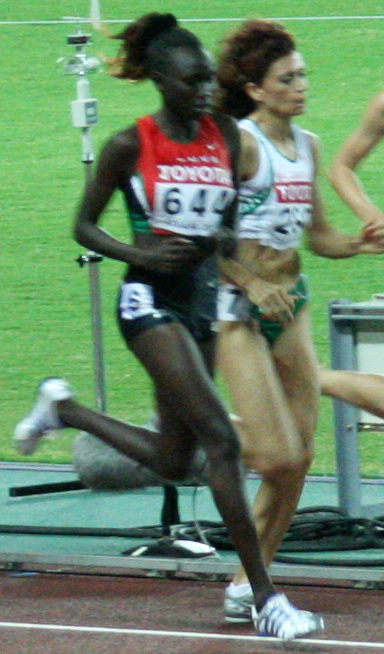

Daniela Yordanova (Bulgarian: Даниела Йорданова) (born 8 March 1976 in Slivnitsa) is a Bulgarian middle-distance runner who specializes in the 1500 metres. She tested positive for testosterone in an out-of-competition doping test in Sofia on 13 June 2008, which eventually got her kicked out of the 2008 Summer Olympics.

== Achievements ==
Year	Competition	Venue	Position	Notes
2000	Olympic Games	Sydney, Australia	10th	5000 m
2001	World Indoor Championships	Lisbon, Portugal	5th	1500 m
2002	European Indoor Championships	Vienna, Austria	5th	1500 m
2002	European Championships	Munich, Germany	5th	1500 m
2003	World Championships	Paris, France	7th	1500 m
2004	World Indoor Championships	Budapest, Hungary	4th	1500 m
2004	Olympic Games	Athens, Greece	5th	1500 m
2006	European Championships	Gothenburg, Sweden	3rd	1500 m
2007	World Championships	Osaka, Japan	3rd	1500 m
2008	World Indoor Championships	Valencia, Spain	3rd	1500 m

=== Personal bests ===
- 800 metres - 2:03.02 s (2001)
- 1500 metres - 3:59.10 s (2004)
- 3000 metres - 8:30.59 s (2001)
- 5000 metres - 14:56.95 s (2000)
- 10,000 metres - 32:40.23 s (2006)
