= Ebru Kavaklıoğlu =

Long-distance runner

Ebru Kavaklıoğlu (born Yelena Kopytova on 14 March 1970 in the Russian SFSR) is a retired long-distance runner who specialized mainly in the 5000 metres.

She initially represented Russia, but became a Turkish citizen by marriage in 1999, changing her name at the same time. She was member of the Fenerbahçe Athletics Club.

== Achievements ==
Year	Competition	Venue	Position	Notes
Representing Unified Team
1992	Olympic Games	Barcelona, Spain	6th	3000 m
Representing Russia
1993	World Championships	Stuttgart, Germany	11th	3000 m
Representing Turkey
1999	World Championships	Seville, Spain	5th	5000 m
2001	Mediterranean Games	Radès, Tunisia	3rd	1500 m
2001	Mediterranean Games	Radès, Tunisia	1st	5000 m

=== Personal bests ===
- 1500 metres - 4:08.45 min (1999)
- 5000 metres - 14:51.69 min (1999)
