= Zahra Ouaziz =

Moroccan long-distance runner

Personal information
- Born: December 20, 1969 (age 56) Oulmes, Morocco
Medal record
Women's Athletics
Representing Morocco
World Championships
| Silver medal – second place | 1999 Seville | 5000 m |
| Bronze medal – third place | 1995 Gothenburg | 5000 m |
African Championships
| Gold medal – first place | 1998 Dakar | 3000 m |

Zahra Ouaziz (Arabic: زهرة واعزيز; born December 20, 1969) is a Moroccan retired long-distance runner. She was the African record holder at 3000 metres and 5000 metres.

== Career ==
Ouaziz broke the 5000 metres African Record in 1998, timing 14:40.19. The record was beaten in September 2000 by Leah Malot of Kenya, the new record was 14:39.83.

Ouaziz found much of her success on the track, but she also won two silver medals at the IAAF World Cross Country Championships and she was the winner of the 1999 Cross Internacional de Itálica.

== Personal bests ==
- 1500 metres – 4:00.60 (1998)
- 3000 metres – 8:26.48 (1999)
- 5000 metres – 14:32.08 (1998)
- 10,000 metres – 34:04.64 (1994)

== Achievements ==
| Year | Tournament | Venue | Result | Distance |
|---|---|---|---|---|
| 1994 | Jeux de la Francophonie | Paris, France | 1st | 10000 metres |
| 1995 | World Championships | Gothenburg, Sweden | 3rd | 5000 metres |
| 1998 | World Cross Country Championships | Marrakesh, Morocco | 2nd | Cross country |
| | African Championships | Dakar, Senegal | 1st | 3000 metres |
| 1999 | World Indoor Championships | Maebashi, Japan | 2nd | 3000 metres |
| | World Championships | Seville, Spain | 2nd | 5000 metres |
| 2000 | World Cross Country Championships | Vilamoura, Portugal | 2nd | Cross country |
