= Mariya Konovalova =

Russian long-distance runner

Medal record

Representing Russia

Women's athletics

European Cross Country Championships
Gold medal – first place	2005 Tilburg	Team
Silver medal – second place	2006 S. G. su Legnano	Individual

Mariya Ivanovna Konovalova (Russian: Мария Ивановна Коновалова; born Mariya Pantyukhova on 14 August 1974 in Angarsk) is a Russian long-distance runner. She has represented Russia in both track running and cross country running and was the silver medallist at the 2006 European Cross Country Championships. She has competed at the World Championships in Athletics on four occasions, and ran for Russia at the 2008 Beijing Olympics.

Konovalova began competing in marathon races in 2010, making her debut at the 2010 London Marathon, but her result there and at all subsequent marathons in her career were annulled following her two-year ban for doping issued in 2015.

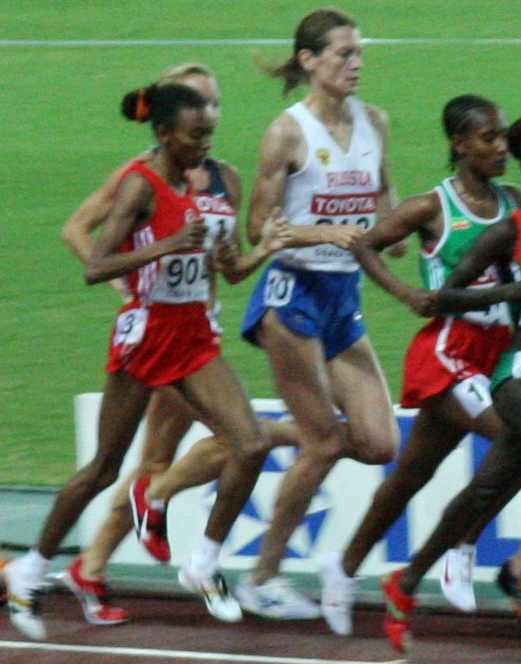
Mariya Konovalova

== Career ==
Born in Angarsk, Konovalova began her athletics career as a 5000 metres track runner. She made her first major appearance over the distance at the 1995 World Championships in Athletics. There, she finished in sixth place in the final with a time of 15:01.23. She had also run over 3000 metres at the 1995 IAAF World Indoor Championships, where she was twelfth overall. She was fifth in that event the following year at the 1996 European Athletics Indoor Championships and won the bronze medal at the 1998 IAAF Grand Prix Final. Fourth in the 5000 m at the 1999 European Cup was followed by a seventh-place finish in the final of the event at the 1999 World Championships in Athletics.

Konovalova progressed into cross country running in the middle of her career. A tenth-place finish at the 2005 European Cross Country Championships was enough to help her Russian teammates (led by Inga Abitova) to the team gold medal. She reached the individual podium the following year at the 2006 European Cross Country Championships, taking the silver medal, although Russia finished fourth in the national team rankings.

Konovalova returned to the competition for a third time at the 2007 European Cross Country Championships but finished in fourth place. Konovalova won at the 2008 Fukuoka International Cross Country meeting in a fast time of 18:54, and she took another circuit win that year at the Almond Blossom Cross Country.

Competing on the track, Konovalova finished eleventh in the 5000 metres at the 2007 World Championships and fifth in the 10,000 metres final at the 2008 Olympic Games, the latter in a new personal best time of 30:35.84 minutes. She returned to the world stage at the 2009 World Championships in Athletics but could only manage eleventh place in the 10,000 m final.

Konovalova opened the 2010 season with a new Russian record in the 2000 metres event at the Yalamov Memorial Meeting. Konovalova made her debut in the marathon at the 2010 London Marathon in April and finished in sixteenth place overall, a result that was later annulled following her 2015 suspension for doping violations. The 2010 European Athletics Championships saw her represent Russia over 5000 m, and she finished in fifth place behind the Ethiopian and Portuguese duos. At the 2010 Chicago Marathon, she reached her first major marathon podium, taking third place with a time of 2:23:50 as her compatriot Liliya Shobukhova won with a national record. This result was also later annulled following her 2015 suspension for doping. She ran at the 2011 London Marathon but could manage only tenth in the fast race, another result that was later annulled following her 2015 suspension for doping.

In 2015, at age 40, Konovalova set a masters marathon world record, running a new marathon personal best as she placed second at the Nagoya Women’s Marathon in Japan in 2:22:27. This result was later annulled following her 2015 suspension for doping. She broke the previous world masters standard of 2:24:54, set by Germany’s Irina Mikitenko at the 2013 Berlin Marathon, but the result was later annulled following her 2015 suspension for doping.

== Doping ==
In November 2015 Konovalova received a two-year competition ban from the Russia Athletic Federation due to irregularities with her biological passport. All of her performances dating back to August 2009 have been annulled. She became eligible to compete again after 26 October 2017.

== Personal bests ==
- 400 metres — 54.53
- 2000 metres — 5:38.98 (2010)
- 3000 metres — 8:30.18 (1999)
- 5000 metres — 14:38.09 (2008)
- 10,000 metres — 30:31.03 (2009)
- Marathon — no valid mark
