= María Cristina Petite =

Spanish long-distance runner

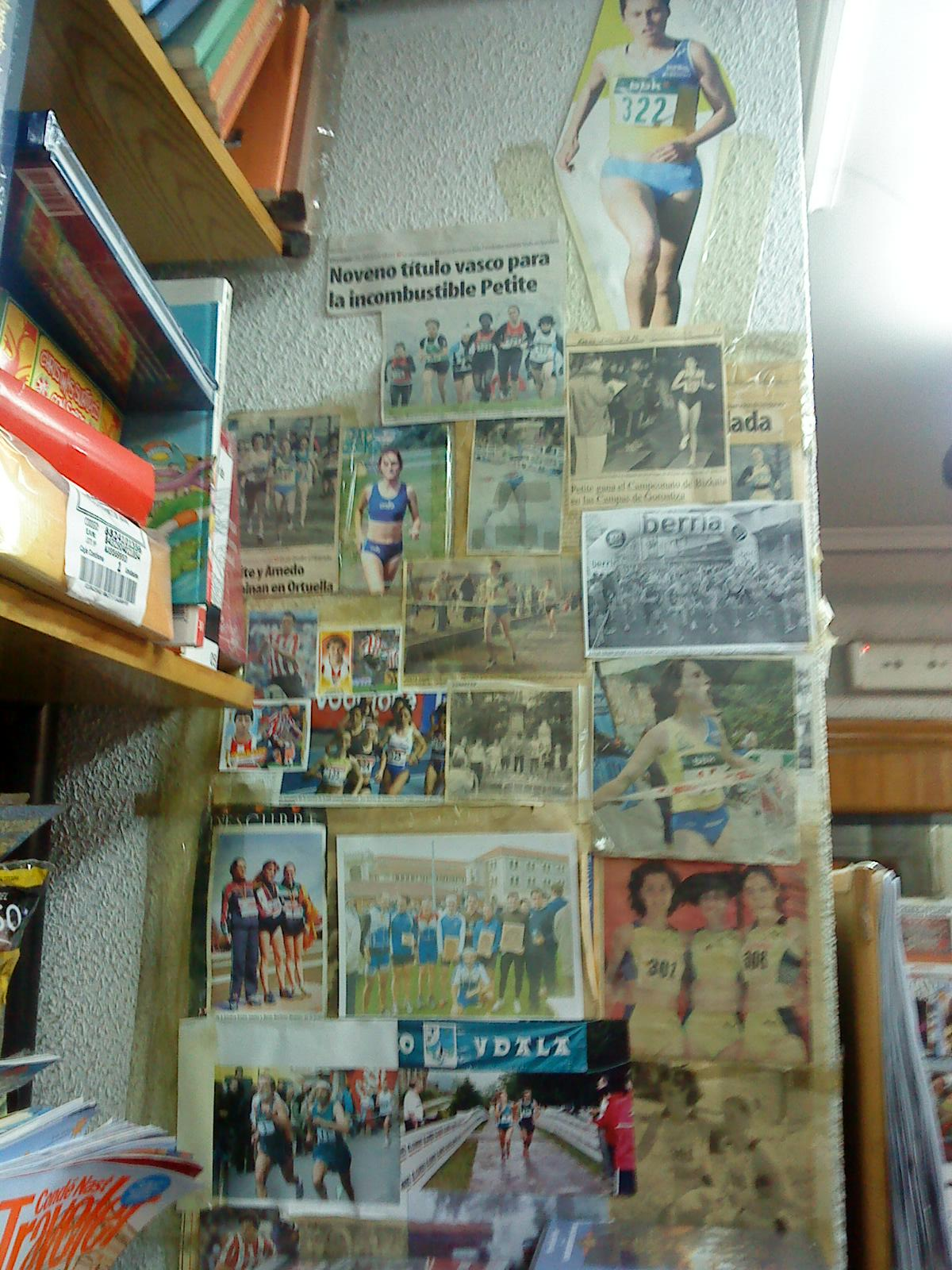
Colashsobrepetite

María Cristina Petite (born 10 May 1972 in Barakaldo) is a retired Spanish long-distance runner who specialized in the 3000 and 5000 metres. She competed in the women's 5000 metres at the 1996 Summer Olympics.

She finished seventh in the 3000 m at the 1999 World Indoor Championships and tenth at the 2002 European Indoor Championships.

== Personal bests ==
- 1500 metres - 4:15.05 min (1996)
- 3000 metres - 8:59.38 min (1998)
- 5000 metres - 15:23.23 min (2001)
- 10,000 metres - 33:32.5 min (2000)
