= Gunhild Haugen =

Norwegian long-distance runner

Gunhild Haugen (née Halle; born 1 June 1972) is a retired Norwegian long-distance runner who specialized in the 5000 and 10,000 metres. She is the daughter of Per Halle, who was her coach as well. Haugen represented IL Runar.

In 5000 m she finished fourteenth at the 1997 World Championships and eighth at the 2002 European Championships. In 10,000 m she finished eighteenth at the 2001 World Championships and eighth at the 2002 European Championships. In addition she competed at the 2000 Summer Olympics without finishing the race. She became Norwegian champion in 1500 m in 1996 and 2000, in 5000 m in 1996, 1997 and 1999-2002 and in 10,000 m in 1999 and 2000.

Haugen retired shortly after the 2002 European Championships.

== Personal bests ==
- 1500 metres - 4:18.47 min (2002)
- 3000 metres - 8:56.71 min (1994)
- 5000 metres - 15:09.00 min (1996) - fourth among Norwegian 10,000 m runners, only behind Ingrid Kristiansen, Susanne Wigene and Grete Waitz.
- 10,000 metres - 31:47.89 min (2000) - third among Norwegian 10,000 m runners, only behind Ingrid Kristiansen and Susanne Wigene.
- Half marathon - 1:11:56 hrs (2002)
