= Helena Javornik =

Slovenian long-distance runner

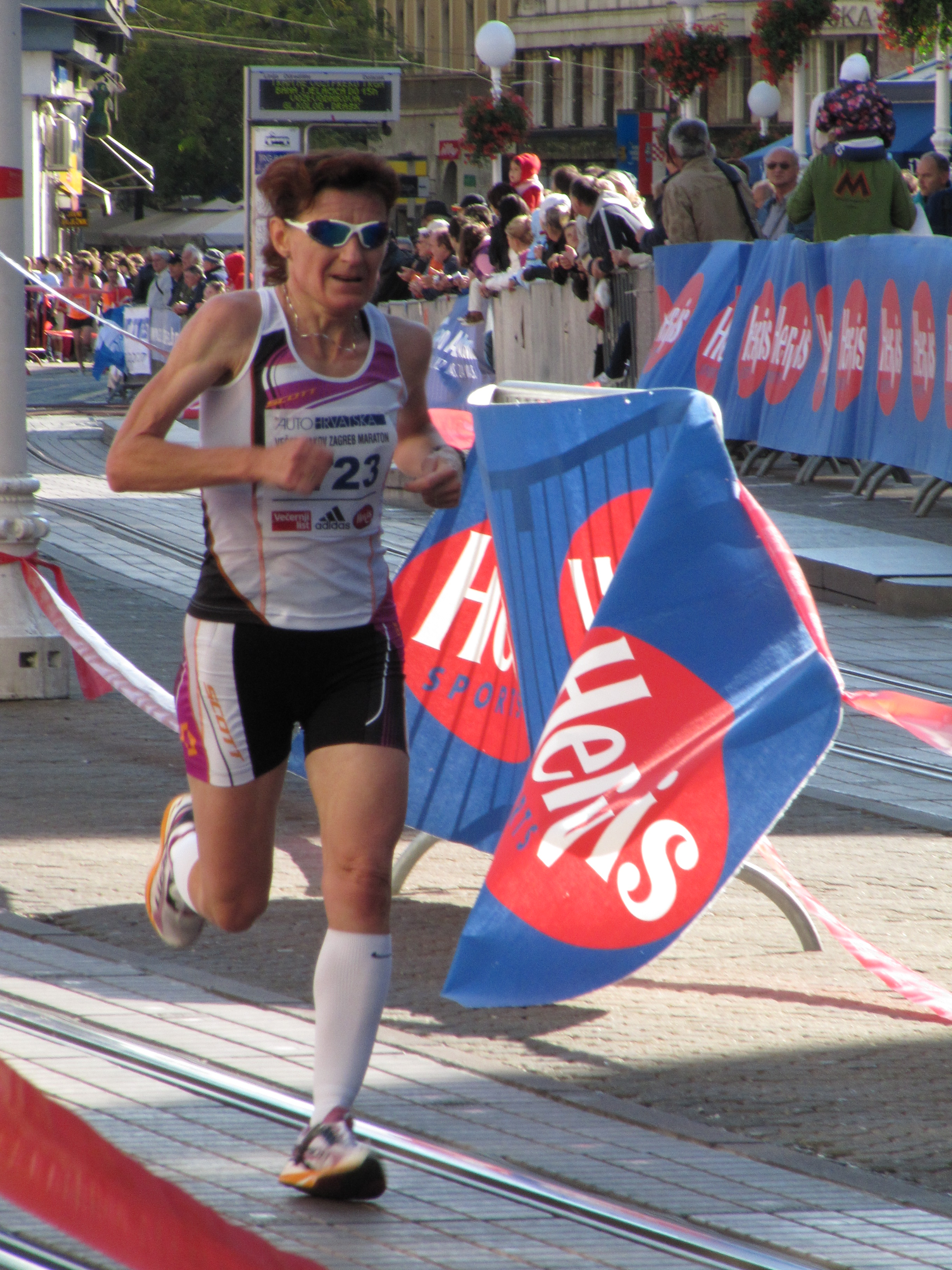
Helena Javornik in the half marathon race at the 2011 Zagreb Marathon.

Helena Javornik (born 26 March 1966, in Celje) is a Slovenian long-distance runner who has specialized in all distances from 1500 metres to the marathon race.

She holds the current national record in 10,000 m with 31:06.63 minutes, achieved at the 2004 Summer Olympics.

She won the Ljubljana Marathon three times consecutively between 1996 and 1998. Her course record of 2:32:33 went unbettered for eleven years.

She tested positive for EPO in March 2008 and was banned for two years by the International Association of Athletics Federations in June 2008. The ban was upheld by the Court of Arbitration for Sport; she became eligible to compete again in June 2010 at the age of 44 years.

== Achievements ==
Year	Competition	Venue	Position	Event	Notes
Representing Slovenia
1993	Mediterranean Games	Narbonne, France	1st	Marathon	2:42:58
1994	European Championships	Helsinki, Finland	—	Marathon	DNF
1995	Vienna Marathon	Vienna, Austria	1st	Marathon	2:36:30
1999	World Indoor Championships	Maebashi, Japan	9th	3000 m	9:00.92
1999	Military World Games	Zagreb, Croatia	1st	1500 m	4:07.34
1999	Military World Games	Zagreb, Croatia	3rd	5000 m	15:37.50
2001	World Indoor Championships	Lisbon, Portugal	8th	1500 m	4:15.76
2001	Mediterranean Games	Radès, Tunisia	6th	1500 m	4:18.51
2001	Mediterranean Games	Radès, Tunisia	4th	5000 m	15:56.67
2002	European Indoor Championships	Vienna, Austria	9th	3000 m	9:04.83
2002	European Championships	Munich, Germany	14th	5000 m	16:06.32
2004	Olympic Games	Athens, Greece	10th	10,000 m	31:06.63 NR
2004	Amsterdam Marathon	Amsterdam, Netherlands	1st	Marathon	2:27:32

=== Personal bests ===
- 1500 metres - 4:06.77 min (2000)
- 3000 metres - 8:50.71 min (2000)
- 5000 metres - 15:15.40 min (1999)
- 10,000 metres - 31:06.63 min (2004)
- Half marathon - 1:09:22 hrs (2004)
- Marathon - 2:27:33 hrs (2004)
