= 1997 World Championships in Athletics – Women's 1500 metres =

These are the results of the Women's 1500 metres event at the 1997 World Championships in Athletics in Athens, Greece. The event was held on 2, 3 and 5 August. The winning margin was 0.39 seconds.

== Medalists ==
Gold	Carla Sacramento; Portugal (POR)
Silver	Regina Jacobs; United States (USA)
Bronze	Anita Weyermann; Switzerland (SUI)

== Results ==
=== Heats ===
First 6 of each Heat (Q) and the next 6 fastest (q) qualified for the semifinals.

Rank	Heat	Name	Nationality	Time	Notes
1	2	Kutre Dulecha	Ethiopia	4:07.70	Q
2	2	Regina Jacobs	United States	4:07.90	Q
3	2	Maite Zúñiga	Spain	4:08.09	Q, SB
4	2	Theresia Kiesl	Austria	4:08.13	Q
5	2	Joanne Pavey	Great Britain	4:08.23	Q
6	2	Anita Weyermann	Switzerland	4:08.30	Q
7	2	Margarita Marusova	Russia	4:08.45	q
8	2	Kathy Butler	Canada	4:08.87	q
9	1	Sonia O'Sullivan	Ireland	4:08.90	Q
10	1	Olga Nelyubova	Russia	4:09.02	Q
11	1	Leah Pells	Canada	4:09.25	Q
12	1	Malin Ewerlöf	Sweden	4:09.28	Q
13	1	Carmen Wustenhagen	Germany	4:09.34	Q
14	2	Andrea Šuldesová	Czech Republic	4:09.49	q
15	3	Suzy Hamilton	United States	4:10.12	Q
16	3	Carla Sacramento	Portugal	4:10.13	Q
17	3	Małgorzata Rydz	Poland	4:10.17	Q, SB
18	3	Svetlana Masterkova	Russia	4:10.22	Q
19	3	Margaret Crowley	Australia	4:10.23	Q
20	3	Patricia Djaté-Taillard	France	4:10.37	Q
21	3	Robyn Meagher	Canada	4:10.44	q
22	3	Sinead Delahunty	Ireland	4:10.45	q
23	3	Natalya Ivanova	Ukraine	4:10.79	q
24	1	Frederique Quentin	France	4:11.10	Q
25	3	Sylvia Kühnemund	Germany	4:11.21	
26	3	Monika Rönnholm-Kinnunen	Finland	4:11.71	
27	1	Karolina Skourti	Greece	4:11.88	
28	2	Tatyana Belovol	Ukraine	4:12.17	
29	1	Nouria Mérah-Benida	Algeria	4:12.21	
30	2	Helena Javornik	Slovenia	4:16.21	
31	1	Sarah Thorsett	United States	4:17.07	
32	1	Samira Raïf	Morocco	4:19.54	
33	3	Shura Hotesa	Ethiopia	4:21.27	
	1	Kelly Holmes	Great Britain	DNF	
	2	Natalia Al Farran	Lebanon	DNS	

=== Semifinals ===
First 5 of each Heat (Q) and the next 2 fastest (q) qualified for the final.

Rank	Heat	Name	Nationality	Time	Notes
1	1	Olga Nelyubova	Russia	4:00.67	Q, PB
2	1	Carla Sacramento	Portugal	4:00.69	Q, SB
3	1	Regina Jacobs	United States	4:00.97	Q
4	1	Sonia O'Sullivan	Ireland	4:05.31	Q, SB
5	1	Anita Weyermann	Switzerland	4:05.71	Q
6	1	Maite Zúñiga	Spain	4:06.66	q, SB
7	2	Malin Ewerlöf	Sweden	4:06.75	Q
8	2	Leah Pells	Canada	4:06.76	Q, SB
9	1	Małgorzata Rydz	Poland	4:06.86	q, SB
10	2	Kutre Dulecha	Ethiopia	4:06.90	Q
11	2	Andrea Šuldesová	Czech Republic	4:07.02	Q, PB
12	2	Robyn Meagher	Canada	4:07.06	Q, SB
13	2	Suzy Hamilton	United States	4:07.19	
14	2	Sinead Delahunty	Ireland	4:07.46	SB
15	1	Kathy Butler	Canada	4:07.68	PB
16	2	Theresia Kiesl	Austria	4:07.89	
17	2	Margaret Crowley	Australia	4:10.37	
18	1	Natalya Ivanova	Ukraine	4:10.39	
19	1	Patricia Djaté-Taillard	France	4:10.85	
20	1	Joanne Pavey	Great Britain	4:11.22	
21	2	Margarita Marusova	Russia	4:14.98	
22	1	Carmen Wustenhagen	Germany	4:15.08	
23	2	Frederique Quentin	France	4:16.15	
24	2	Svetlana Masterkova	Russia	4:22.74	

=== Final ===
Rank	Name	Nationality	Time	Notes
1st place, gold medalist(s)	Carla Sacramento	Portugal	4:04.24	SB
2nd place, silver medalist(s)	Regina Jacobs	United States	4:04.63	
3rd place, bronze medalist(s)	Anita Weyermann	Switzerland	4:04.70	SB
4	Maite Zúñiga	Spain	4:04.80	SB
5	Leah Pells	Canada	4:06.18	SB
6	Andrea Šuldesová	Czech Republic	4:06.33	PB
7	Olga Nelyubova	Russia	4:07.34	
8	Sonia O'Sullivan	Ireland	4:07.81	
9	Kutre Dulecha	Ethiopia	4:08.15	
10	Malin Ewerlöf	Sweden	4:08.68	
11	Robyn Meagher	Canada	4:10.83	
12	Małgorzata Rydz	Poland	4:13.25	
