= 1997 IAAF World Indoor Championships – Women's 1500 metres =

The women's 1500 metres event at the 1997 IAAF World Indoor Championships was held on March 8–9.

== Doping disqualification ==
The silver medal had originally been won by Mary Slaney of the United States, but she was later found guilty of a doping offense and stripped of it.

== Medalists ==
Gold	Silver	Bronze
Yekaterina Podkopayeva; Russia	Patricia Djaté-Taillard; France	Lidia Chojecka; Poland

== Results ==
=== Heats ===
First 4 of each heat (Q) and next 4 fastest (q) qualified for the final.

Rank	Heat	Name	Nationality	Time	Notes
1	2	Patricia Djaté-Taillard	France	4:09.00	Q
	2	Mary Slaney	United States	DQ (4:10.27)	Q for final, but later DQ for doping
2	2	Malin Ewerlöf	Sweden	4:11.02	Q, PB
3	2	Catalina Gheorghiu	Romania	4:11.02	Q, SB
4	1	Yekaterina Podkopayeva	Russia	4:11.23	Q
5	1	Suzy Hamilton	United States	4:11.47	Q
6	1	Carla Sacramento	Portugal	4:11.51	Q
7	1	Lidia Chojecka	Poland	4:11.57	Q, PB
8	1	Kutre Dulecha	Ethiopia	4:11.60	q, AR
9	2	Margarita Marusova	Russia	4:11.73	q
10	2	Mayte Zúñiga	Spain	4:12.15	q
11	1	Sylvia Kühnemund	Germany	4:12.22	q
12	1	Frédérique Quentin	France	4:15.32	
13	1	Shirley Griffiths	Great Britain	4:15.45	
14	2	Jackline Maranga	Kenya	4:15.57	
15	2	Gwen Griffiths	South Africa	4:20.52	
16	2	Niusha Mancilla	Bolivia	4:28.70	SB
	2	Małgorzata Rydz	Poland	DNF	
	1	Sinéad Delahunty	Ireland	DNS	
	1	Gabriela Szabo	Romania	DNS	
	2	Sonia O'Sullivan	Ireland	DNS	

=== Final ===
Rank	Name	Nationality	Time	Notes
1st place, gold medalist(s)	Yekaterina Podkopayeva	Russia	4:05.19	PB
2nd place, silver medalist(s)	Patricia Djaté-Taillard	France	4:06.16	NR
3rd place, bronze medalist(s)	Lidia Chojecka	Poland	4:06.25	NR
4	Carla Sacramento	Portugal	4:06.33	NR
5	Sylvia Kühnemund	Germany	4:06.56	PB
6	Catalina Gheorghiu	Romania	4:07.04	PB
7	Malin Ewerlöf	Sweden	4:09.72	PB
8	Kutre Dulecha	Ethiopia	4:09.76	AR
9	Suzy Hamilton	United States	4:10.82	
10	Mayte Zúñiga	Spain	4:11.56	
11	Margarita Marusova	Russia	4:14.43	
(2)	Mary Slaney	United States	DQ (4:05.22)	Doping
