= 1999 World Championships in Athletics – Women's 1500 metres =

These are the official results of the Women's 1500 metres event at the 1999 IAAF World Championships in Seville, Spain. There were a total number of 29 participating athletes, with two qualifying heats and the final held on Sunday 29 August 1999 at 20:10h. The winning margin was 0.82 seconds.

== Medalists ==
Gold	Svetlana Masterkova; Russia (RUS)
Silver	Regina Jacobs; United States (USA)
Bronze	Kutre Dulecha; Ethiopia (ETH)

== Heats ==
- Held on Friday 27 August 1999

RANK	HEAT 1	TIME
1.	Violeta Beclea-Szekely (ROM)	4:05.00
2.	Ana Amelia Menéndez (ESP)	4:05.21
3.	Carla Sacramento (POR)	4:05.21
4.	Marla Runyan (USA)	4:05.27
5.	Anna Jakubczak (POL)	4:05.71
6.	Hayley Parry-Tullett (GBR)	4:05.72
7.	Olga Nelyubova (RUS)	4:06.01
8.	Malin Ewerlöf (SWE)	4:07.67
9.	Nouria Mérah-Benida (ALG)	4:08.90
10.	Nuria Fernández (ESP)	4:09.39
11.	Leah Pells (CAN)	4:10.76
12.	Judit Varga (HUN)	4:16.66
13.	Stephanie Best (USA)	4:19.87
	Yelena-Ebru Kopytova-Kavaklıoğlu (TUR)	DNS
	Sukhbaatar Erdenetuya (MGL)	DNS

RANK	HEAT 2	TIME
1.	Regina Jacobs (USA)	4:04.75
2.	Svetlana Masterkova (RUS)	4:04.83
3.	Anita Weyermann (SUI)	4:04.88
4.	Kutre Dulecha (ETH)	4:04.93
5.	Elena Buhăianu (ROM)	4:04.97
6.	Jackline Maranga (KEN)	4:04.98
7.	Lidia Chojecka (POL)	4:05.16
8.	Lyudmila Rogachova (RUS)	4:05.72
9.	Maite Zúñiga (ESP)	4:06.75
10.	Robyn Meagher (CAN)	4:06.88
11.	Helen Pattinson (GBR)	4:12.17
12.	Elaine Fitzgerald (IRL)	4:12.77
13.	Frédérique Quentin (FRA)	4:14.76
14.	Julia Sakara (ZIM)	4:19.65

== Final ==
RANK	FINAL	TIME
	Svetlana Masterkova (RUS)	3:59.53
	Regina Jacobs (USA)	4:00.35
	Kutre Dulecha (ETH)	4:00.96
4.	Violeta Beclea-Szekely (ROM)	4:00.98
5.	Carla Sacramento (POR)	4:01.29
6.	Elena Buhăianu (ROM)	4:04.27
7.	Anna Jakubczak (POL)	4:04.40
8.	Ana Amelia Menéndez (ESP)	4:04.72
9.	Lidia Chojecka (POL)	4:05.55
10.	Marla Runyan (USA)	4:06.45
11.	Jackline Maranga (KEN)	4:07.28
12.	Anita Weyermann (SUI)	4:17.86
