= Athletics at the 2000 Summer Olympics – Women's 1500 metres =

Women's 1500 metres at the Games of the XXVII Olympiad
- Venue: Stadium Australia
- Date: 27 September 2000 (heats); 29 September 2000 (semi-finals); 30 September 2000 (final)
- Competitors: 42 from 28 nations
- Winning time: 4:05.10

Medalists
1st place, gold medalist(s)		Nouria Mérah-Benida; Algeria
2nd place, silver medalist(s)		Violeta Szekely; Romania
3rd place, bronze medalist(s)		Gabriela Szabo; Romania

The Women's 1500 metres at the 2000 Summer Olympics as part of the athletics programme was held at Stadium Australia on Wednesday 27 September, Thursday 28 September, and Saturday 30 September 2000. There were a total number of 43 participating athletes.

The winning margin was 0.05 seconds which as of 2023 remains the only time the women's Olympic 1500 metres has been won by less than 0.1 seconds.

The top six runners in each of the initial three heats automatically qualified for the semi-final. The next six fastest runners from across the heats also qualified for the semi-final. The top five runners in each semi-final automatically qualified for the final. The next two fastest runners from across the heats also qualified for the final.

The last lap was the battleground for this final. Going into this lap, Portugal's Carla Sacramento held the lead, with Poland's Lidia Chojecka on the outside and America's Suzy Favor-Hamilton edging ahead on the inside. Over the next 200 metres, Favor-Hamilton edged ahead of Sacramento while a pack of six formed behind, led by Algeria's Nouria Mérah-Benida. Favor-Hamilton held the lead around the turn as Mérah-Benida moved to her shoulder. As the final straightaway neared, Favor-Hamilton looked at her feet expecting her usual final acceleration. It was not there, as first Mérah-Benida went by, followed by the other Polish runner, Anna Jakubczak, and then Chojecka and Romania's Violeta Szekely. After a small gap, Ethiopia's Kutre Dulecha went by Favor-Hamilton, who then crashed to the track untouched. Years later, Favor-Hamilton admitted that the fall was deliberate, as she realised that she was not going to win. As a result, she finished in last place.

At the head of the straightaway, Mérah-Benida opened up a clear lead over the two Polish runners. Moving out to lane 3, Szekely ran around Jakubczak and Chojecka, with Dulecha following in her wake. With speed, suddenly Mérah-Benida's lead started to shrink. The Algerian runner was tiring fast, but she managed to hold off Szekely's furious charge, crossing the line 0.05 seconds ahead. All the way down the straightaway, Dulecha looked like she would hold on for the bronze – but from last place with 200 metres to go, Gabriela Szabo came sprinting down the outside to take the medal, meaning that there were two Romanians on the podium. Only 0.23 seconds separated the first four runners – but none of them were directly battling the others, each taking a different pace and path to the tight finish.

== Records ==
World Record	3:50.46	Yunxia Qu	China	Beijing, China	11 September 1993
Olympic Record	3:53.96	Paula Ivan	Romania	Seoul, South Korea	1 October 1988

== Medals ==
Gold:	Silver:	Bronze:
Nouria Mérah-Benida, Algeria	Violeta Szekely, Romania	Gabriela Szabo, Romania

== Results ==
All times shown are in seconds.

- Q denotes qualification by place in heat.
- q denotes qualification by overall place.
- DNS denotes did not start.
- DNF denotes did not finish.
- DQ denotes disqualification.
- NR denotes national record.
- OR denotes Olympic record.
- WR denotes world record.
- PB denotes personal best.
- SB denotes season best.

== Qualifying heats ==
=== Round 1 ===
Heat 1 of 3 Date: Wednesday 27 September 2000
Place		Athlete	Nation	Lane	Time	Qual.	Record
Heat	Overall	Athlete	Nation	Lane	Time	Qual.	Record
1	1	Suzy Favor Hamilton	United States	15	4:08.08	Q	
2	2	Anna Jakubczak	Poland	1	4:08.13	Q	
3	3	Gabriela Szabo	Romania	14	4:08.33	Q	
4	4	Süreyya Ayhan	Turkey	5	4:08.37	Q	
5	5	Carla Sacramento	Portugal	12	4:08.41	Q	
6	6	Helen Pattinson	Great Britain	7	4:08:80	Q	
7	7	Margaret Crowley	Australia	13	4:08.85	q	
8	8	Anita Weyermann	Switzerland	6	4:09.28	q	
9	9	Lyudmila Rogachova	Russia	9	4:09.81	q	
10	12	Mardrea Hyman	Jamaica	4	4:10.21	q	
11	33	Abebech Negussie	Ethiopia	2	4:15.52		
12	35	Julia Sakara	Zimbabwe	3	4:21.94		
13	36	Tetyana Kryvobok	Ukraine	11	4:22.11		
14	40	Shazia Hidayat	Pakistan	8	5:07.17		
		Leah Pells	Canada	10	DNF		

Heat 2 of 3 Date: Wednesday 27 September 2000
Place		Athlete	Nation	Lane	Time	Qual.	Record
Heat	Overall	Athlete	Nation	Lane	Time	Qual.	Record
1	11	Violeta Szekely	Romania	11	4:10.18	Q	
2	14	Lidia Chojecka	Poland	10	4:10.34	Q	
3	15	Kelly Holmes	Great Britain	6	4:10.38	Q	
4	17	Veerle Dejaeghere	Belgium	2	4:10.68	Q	
5	18	Sabine Fischer	Switzerland	13	4:10.78	Q	
6	19	Seloua Ouaziz	Morocco	8	4:10:82	Q	
7	20	Marla Runyan	United States	3	4:10.83	q	
8	24	Georgie Clarke	Australia	1	4:11.74	q	
9	28	Toni Hodgkinson	New Zealand	9	4:12.59		
10	31	Naomi Mugo	Kenya	7	4:13.18		
11	32	Hareg Sidelil	Ethiopia	5	4:14.05		
12	37	Natalia Rodriguez	Spain	4	4:22.82		
13	38	Daniela Kuleska	Macedonia	14	4:33.50		
		Svetlana Masterkova	Russia	12	DNF		

Heat 3 of 3 Date: Wednesday 27 September 2000
Place		Athlete	Nation	Lane	Time	Qual.	Record
Heat	Overall	Athlete	Nation	Lane	Time	Qual.	Record
1	10	Kutre Dulecha	Ethiopia	4	4:09.88	Q	
2	13	Nouria Mérah-Benida	Algeria	1	4:10.24	Q	
3	16	Hayley Tullett	Great Britain	5	4:10.58	Q	
4	21	Elena Iagăr	Romania	8	4:11.35	Q	
5	22	Nuria Fernandez	Spain	13	4:11.46	Q	
6	23	Irina Krakoviak	Lithuania	6	4:11:57	Q	
7	25	Sinead Delahunty	Ireland	14	4:11.75		
8	26	Fatma Lanouar	Tunisia	11	4:11.87		
9	27	Shayne Culpepper	United States	12	4:12.52		
10	29	Natalya Gorelova	Russia	9	4:12.84		
11	30	Sarah Jamieson	Australia	3	4:12.90		
12	34	Helena Javornik	Slovenia	10	4:18.18		
13	39	Silvia Felipo	Andorra	2	4:45.32		
		Hasna Benhassi	Morocco	7	DNS		

Overall Results Round 1

Round 1 Overall Results
Place	Athlete	Nation	Heat	Lane	Place	Time	Qual.	Record
1	Suzy Favor Hamilton	United States	1	15	1	4:08.08	Q	
2	Anna Jakubczak	Poland	1	1	2	4:08.13	Q	
3	Gabriela Szabo	Romania	1	14	3	4:08.33	Q	
4	Süreyya Ayhan	Turkey	1	5	4	4:08.37	Q	
5	Carla Sacramento	Portugal	1	12	5	4:08.41	Q	
6	Helen Pattinson	Great Britain	1	7	6	4:08.80	Q	
7	Margaret Crowley	Australia	1	13	7	4:08.85	q	
8	Anita Weyermann	Switzerland	1	6	8	4:09.28	q	
9	Lyudmila Rogachova	Russia	1	9	9	4:09.81	q	
10	Kutre Dulecha	Ethiopia	3	4	1	4:09.88	Q	
11	Violeta Szekely	Romania	2	11	1	4:10.18	Q	
12	Mardrea Hyman	Jamaica	1	4	10	4:10.21	q	
13	Nouria Mérah-Benida	Algeria	3	1	2	4:10.24	Q	
14	Lidia Chojecka	Poland	2	10	2	4:10.34	Q	
15	Kelly Holmes	Great Britain	2	6	3	4:10.38	Q	
16	Hayley Tullett	Great Britain	3	5	3	4:10.58	Q	
17	Veerle Dejaeghere	Belgium	2	2	4	4:10.68	Q	
18	Sabine Fischer	Switzerland	2	13	5	4:10.78	Q	
19	Seloua Ouaziz	Morocco	2	8	6	4:10.82	Q	
20	Marla Runyan	United States	2	3	7	4:10.83	q	
21	Elena Iagăr	Romania	3	8	4	4:11.35	Q	
22	Nuria Fernandez	Spain	3	13	5	4:11.46	Q	
23	Irina Krakoviak	Lithuania	3	6	6	4:11.57	Q	
24	Georgie Clarke	Australia	2	1	8	4:11.74	q	
25	Sinead Delahunty	Ireland	3	14	7	4:11.75		
26	Fatma Lanouar	Tunisia	3	11	8	4:11.87		
27	Shayne Culpepper	United States	3	12	9	4:12.62		
28	Toni Hodgkinson	New Zealand	2	9	9	4:12.59		
29	Natalya Gorelova	Russia	3	9	10	4:12.84		
30	Sarah Jamieson	Australia	3	3	11	4:12.90		
31	Naomi Mugo	Kenya	2	7	10	4:13.18		
32	Hareg Sidelil	Ethiopia	2	5	11	4:14.05		
33	Abebech Negussie	Ethiopia	1	2	11	4:15.52		
34	Helena Javornik	Slovenia	3	10	12	4:18:18		
35	Julia Sakara	Zimbabwe	1	3	12	4:21.94		
36	Tetyana Kryvobok	Ukraine	1	11	13	4:22.11		
37	Natalia Rodriguez	Spain	2	4	12	4:22.82		
38	Daniela Kuleska	Macedonia	2	14	13	4:33.50		
39	Silvia Felipo	Andorra	3	2	13	4:45.32		
40	Shazia Hidayat	Pakistan	1	8	14	5:07.17		
	Svetlana Masterkova	Russia	2	12		DNF		
	Leah Pells	Canada	1	10		DNF		
	Hasna Benhassi	Morocco	3	7		DNS		

=== Semi-finals ===
Heat 1 of 2 Date: Thursday 28 September 2000
Place		Athlete	Nation	Lane	Time	Qual.	Record
Heat	Overall	Athlete	Nation	Lane	Time	Qual.	Record
1	1	Nouria Mérah-Benida	Algeria	6	4:05.24	Q	
2	2	Suzy Favor Hamilton	United States	2	4:05.25	Q	
3	3	Hayley Tullett	Great Britain	1	4:05.34	Q	
4	4	Kelly Holmes	Great Britain	10	4:05.35	Q	SB
5	5	Lidia Chojecka	Poland	12	4:05.78	Q	
6	6	Marla Runyan	United States	1	4:06:14	q	SB
7	8	Sabine Fischer	Switzerland	4	4:06.67	q	
8	15	Margaret Crowley	Australia	3	4:09.16		
9	16	Lyudmila Rogachova	Russia	5	4:09.18		
10	19	Nuria Fernandez	Spain	9	4:10.92		
11	22	Irina Krakoviak	Lithuania	8	4:14.57		
12	23	Elena Iagăr	Romania	3	4:21.94		

Heat 2 of 2 Date: Thursday 28 September 2000
Place		Athlete	Nation	Lane	Time	Qual.	Record
Heat	Overall	Athlete	Nation	Lane	Time	Qual.	Record
1	7	Violeta Szekely	Romania	8	4:06.60	Q	
2	9	Kutre Dulecha	Ethiopia	3	4:06.78	Q	
3	10	Anna Jakubczak	Poland	11	4:07.03	Q	SB
4	11	Gabriela Szabo	Romania	12	4:07.38	Q	
5	12	Carla Sacramento	Portugal	7	4:07.65	Q	
6	13	Veerle Dejaeghere	Belgium	2	4:07:87		
7	14	Seloua Ouaziz	Morocco	6	4:09.11		
8	17	Süreyya Ayhan	Turkey	10	4:09.42		
9	18	Helen Pattinson	Great Britain	4	4:09.60		
10	20	Georgie Clarke	Australia	1	4:10.99		
11	21	Mardrea Hyman	Jamaica	5	4:14.20		
12	24	Anita Weyermann	Switzerland	9	4:30.80		

Overall Results Semi-finals

Round 1 Overall Results
Place	Athlete	Nation	Heat	Lane	Place	Time	Qual.	Record
1	Nouria Mérah-Benida	Algeria	1	6	1	4:05.24	Q	
2	Suzy Favor Hamilton	United States	1	2	2	4:05.25	Q	
3	Hayley Tullett	Great Britain	1	1	3	4:05.34	Q	
4	Kelly Holmes	Great Britain	1	10	4	4:05.35	Q	SB
5	Lidia Chojecka	Poland	1	12	5	4:05.78	Q	
6	Marla Runyan	United States	1	11	6	4:16.14	q	SB
7	Violeta Szekely	Romania	2	8	1	4:06.60	Q	
8	Sabine Fischer	Switzerland	1	4	7	4:06.67	q	
9	Kutre Dulecha	Ethiopia	2	3	2	4:06.78	Q	
10	Anna Jakubczak	Poland	2	11	3	4:07.03	Q	SB
11	Gabriela Szabo	Romania	2	12	4	4:07.38	Q	
12	Carla Sacramento	Portugal	2	7	5	4:07.65	Q	
13	Veerle Dejaeghere	Belgium	2	2	6	4:07.87		
14	Seloua Ouaziz	Morocco	2	6	7	4:09.11		
15	Margaret Crowley	Australia	1	3	8	4:09.16		
16	Lyudmila Rogachova	Russia	1	5	9	4:09.18		
17	Süreyya Ayhan	Turkey	2	10	8	4:09.42		
18	Helen Pattinson	Great Britain	2	4	9	4:09.60		
19	Nuria Fernandez	Spain	1	9	10	4:10.92		
20	Georgie Clarke	Australia	2	1	10	4:10.99		
21	Mardrea Hyman	Jamaica	2	5	11	4:14.20		
22	Irina Krakoviak	Lithuania	1	11	8	4:14.57		
23	Elena Iagăr	Romania	1	7	12	4:14.75		
24	Anita Weyermann	Switzerland	2	9	12	4:30.80		

== Final ==
Date: Saturday 30 September 2000
Place	Athlete	Nation	Lane	Time	Record
1st place, gold medalist(s)	Nouria Mérah-Benida	Algeria	8	4:05.10	
2nd place, silver medalist(s)	Violeta Szekely	Romania	4	4:05.15	
3rd place, bronze medalist(s)	Gabriela Szabo	Romania	11	4:05.27	
4	Kutre Dulecha	Ethiopia	5	4:05.33	
5	Lidia Chojecka	Poland	2	4:06.42	
6	Anna Jakubczak	Poland	9	4:06.49	SB
7	Kelly Holmes	Great Britain	12	4:08.02	
8	Marla Runyan	United States	10	4:08.30	
9	Sabine Fischer	Switzerland	7	4:08.84	
10	Carla Sacramento	Portugal	1	4:11.15	
11	Hayley Tullett	Great Britain	6	4:22.29	
12	Suzy Favor Hamilton	United States	3	4:23.05	
