= 1998 European Athletics Championships – Women's 1500 metres =

Women's 1500 metres at the European Athletics Championships

The women's 1500 metres at the 1998 European Athletics Championships was held at the Népstadion on 21 and 23 August.

== Medalists ==
Gold	Svetlana Masterkova; Russia
Silver	Carla Sacramento; Portugal
Bronze	Anita Weyermann; Switzerland

== Results ==
KEY:	q	Fastest non-qualifiers	Q	Qualified	NR	National record	PB	Personal best	SB	Seasonal best

=== Round 1 ===
Qualification: First 4 in each heat (Q) and the next 4 fastest (q) advance to the Final.

Rank	Heat	Name	Nationality	Time	Notes
1	1	Elena Buhăianu	Romania	4:08.11	Q, PB
2	1	Carla Sacramento	Portugal	4:08.33	Q
3	1	Anita Weyermann	Switzerland	4:08.34	Q
4	1	Lidia Chojecka	Poland	4:08.54	Q
5	2	Svetlana Masterkova	Russia	4:08.62	Q
6	1	Judit Varga	Hungary	4:08.83	q, PB
7	2	Violeta Szekely	Romania	4:08.88	Q
8	1	Maite Zúñiga	Spain	4:08.93	q
9	2	Anna Jakubczak	Poland	4:09.36	Q
10	2	Andrea Šuldesová	Czech Republic	4:09.54	Q
11	2	Sinead Delahunty	Ireland	4:09.62	q
12	1	Olga Komyagina	Russia	4:09.81	q
13	1	Luminita Zaituc	Germany	4:10.08	
14	2	Olena Gorodnycheva	Ukraine	4:10.21	
15	2	Olga Nelyubova	Russia	4:11.79	
16	2	Brigitta Tusai	Hungary	4:12.11	
17	2	Frederique Quentin	France	4:17.00	
18	1	Patricia Djaté-Taillard	France	4:17.29	
	1	Malin Ewerlöf	Sweden	DNS	

=== Final ===
Rank	Name	Nationality	Time	Notes
1st place, gold medalist(s)	Svetlana Masterkova	Russia	4:11.91	
2nd place, silver medalist(s)	Carla Sacramento	Portugal	4:12.62	
3rd place, bronze medalist(s)	Anita Weyermann	Switzerland	4:13.06	
4	Anna Jakubczak	Poland	4:13.33	
5	Violeta Szekely	Romania	4:14.66	
6	Lidia Chojecka	Poland	4:15.00	
7	Andrea Šuldesová	Czech Republic	4:15.04	
8	Maite Zúñiga	Spain	4:15.10	
9	Sinead Delahunty	Ireland	4:15.38	
10	Elena Buhăianu	Romania	4:15.48	
11	Olga Komyagina	Russia	4:15.73	
12	Judit Varga	Hungary	4:18.25	
