= 2003 IAAF World Indoor Championships – Women's 1500 metres =

The women's 1500 metres event at the 2003 IAAF World Indoor Championships was held on March 15–16 in Birmingham, United Kingdom.

== Medalists ==
Gold	Silver	Bronze
Regina Jacobs; United States	Kelly Holmes; Great Britain	Yekaterina Rozenberg; Russia

== Results ==
=== Heats ===
First 2 of each heat (Q) and next 3 fastest (q) qualified for the semifinals.

Rank	Heat	Name	Nationality	Time	Notes
1	3	Regina Jacobs	United States	4:09.06	Q
2	3	Elena Antoci	Romania	4:09.34	Q, SB
3	3	Hasna Benhassi	Morocco	4:09.37	q
4	3	Kutre Dulecha	Ethiopia	4:09.65	q
5	2	Alesia Turava	Belarus	4:09.93	Q
6	2	Kelly Holmes	Great Britain	4:09.99	Q
7	2	Natalya Gorelova	Russia	4:10.17	q
8	1	Iryna Lishchynska	Ukraine	4:10.28	Q
9	1	Yekaterina Rozenberg	Russia	4:10.28	Q
10	1	Lidia Chojecka	Poland	4:10.51	
11	3	Nelya Neporadna	Ukraine	4:10.77	
12	3	Zulema Fuentes-Pila	Spain	4:12.03	PB
13	1	Judit Varga	Hungary	4:12.48	
14	1	Abir Nakhli	Tunisia	4:13.83	NR
15	1	Sarah Schwald	United States	4:14.13	
16	2	Maria Cioncan	Romania	4:14.52	
17	1	Hayley Ovens	Great Britain	4:15.25	
18	2	Emmanuelle Bossert	France	4:15.82	
19	2	Seloua Ouaziz	Morocco	4:16.53	PB
20	1	Aurélie Coulaud	France	4:16.72	
21	2	Konstadina Efedaki	Greece	4:17.15	
22	2	Sonja Roman	Slovenia	4:18.09	
23	3	Fatma Lanouar	Tunisia	4:18.45	
24	3	Anna Jakubczak	Poland	4:18.56	
25	1	Maria Lynch	Ireland	4:21.44	
26	2	Eva Arias	Spain	4:21.58	
	3	Niusha Mancilla	Bolivia	DNS	

=== Final ===
Rank	Name	Nationality	Time	Notes
1st place, gold medalist(s)	Regina Jacobs	United States	4:01.67	CR
2nd place, silver medalist(s)	Kelly Holmes	Great Britain	4:02.66	NR
3rd place, bronze medalist(s)	Yekaterina Rozenberg	Russia	4:02.80	
4	Natalya Gorelova	Russia	4:06.18	
5	Iryna Lishchynska	Ukraine	4:07.19	PB
6	Elena Antoci	Romania	4:07.44	SB
7	Alesia Turava	Belarus	4:08.20	
8	Hasna Benhassi	Morocco	4:09.03	
9	Kutre Dulecha	Ethiopia	4:11.15	
