= 1998 European Athletics Indoor Championships – Women's 1500 metres =

The women's 1500 metres event at the 1998 European Athletics Indoor Championships was held on 27–28 February.

== Medalists ==
Gold	Silver	Bronze
Theresia Kiesl; Austria	Lidia Chojecka; Poland	Violeta Szekely; Romania

== Results ==
=== Heats ===
First 3 from each heat (Q) and the next 3 fastest (q) qualified for the final.

Rank	Heat	Name	Nationality	Time	Notes
1	2	Luminita Gogîrlea	Romania	4:17.12	Q
2	2	Lidia Chojecka	Poland	4:17.17	Q
3	2	Sylvia Kühnemund	Germany	4:17.27	Q
4	2	Maite Zúñiga	Spain	4:17.56	q
5	1	Theresia Kiesl	Austria	4:17.59	Q
6	1	Frédérique Quentin	France	4:17.90	Q
7	1	Violeta Szekely	Romania	4:18.05	Q
8	2	Freda Davoren	Ireland	4:18.21	q
9	1	Brigitta Tusai	Hungary	4:18.42	q
10	1	Olga Komyagina	Russia	4:18.60	
11	2	Lale Öztürk	Turkey	4:25.21	
12	1	Ljiljana Ćulibrk	Croatia	4:35.03	

=== Final ===
Rank	Name	Nationality	Time	Notes
1st place, gold medalist(s)	Theresia Kiesl	Austria	4:13.62	
2nd place, silver medalist(s)	Lidia Chojecka	Poland	4:14.93	
3rd place, bronze medalist(s)	Violeta Szekely	Romania	4:15.54	
4	Sylvia Kühnemund	Germany	4:15.64	
5	Luminita Gogîrlea	Romania	4:16.68	
6	Maite Zúñiga	Spain	4:18.41	
7	Brigitta Tusai	Hungary	4:18.44	
8	Frédérique Quentin	France	4:18.94	
9	Freda Davoren	Ireland	4:19.79	
