= 1996 European Athletics Indoor Championships – Women's 1500 metres =

The women's 1500 metres event at the 1996 European Athletics Indoor Championships was held in Stockholm Globe Arena on 9–10 March.

== Medalists ==
Gold	Silver	Bronze
Carla Sacramento; Portugal	Yekaterina Podkopayeva; Russia	Małgorzata Rydz; Poland

== Results ==
=== Heats ===
First 3 from each heat (Q) and the next 3 fastest (q) qualified for the final.

Rank	Heat	Name	Nationality	Time	Notes
1	1	Theresia Kiesl	Austria	4:14.20	Q
2	1	Małgorzata Rydz	Poland	4:14.35	Q
3	1	Catalina Gheorghiu	Romania	4:14.40	Q
4	1	Yekaterina Podkopayeva	Russia	4:14.44	q
5	2	Carla Sacramento	Portugal	4:15.75	Q
6	1	Mayte Zúñiga	Spain	4:16.06	q
7	2	Simona Ionescu	Romania	4:16.15	Q
8	2	Frédérique Quentin	France	4:16.71	Q
9	1	Sylvia Kühnemund	Germany	4:17.82	q
10	2	Yelena Bychukovskaya	Belarus	4:18.05	
11	2	Cristina Petite	Spain	4:18.31	
12	2	Debbie Gunning	Great Britain	4:18.32	
13	2	Freda Davoren	Ireland	4:20.54	
14	1	Anila Kasati-Mekshi	Albania	4:24.18	

=== Final ===
Rank	Name	Nationality	Time	Notes
1st place, gold medalist(s)	Carla Sacramento	Portugal	4:08.95	
2nd place, silver medalist(s)	Yekaterina Podkopayeva	Russia	4:09.65	
3rd place, bronze medalist(s)	Małgorzata Rydz	Poland	4:10.50	
4	Catalina Gheorghiu	Romania	4:10.56	
5	Theresia Kiesl	Austria	4:12.61	
6	Sylvia Kühnemund	Germany	4:13.34	
7	Frédérique Quentin	France	4:13.92	
8	Simona Ionescu	Romania	4:16.19	
	Mayte Zúñiga	Spain	DNF	
