= 2000 European Athletics Indoor Championships – Women's 1500 metres =

The women's 1500 metres event at the 2000 European Athletics Indoor Championships was held on February 25–26.

== Medalists ==
Gold	Silver	Bronze
Violeta Szekely; Romania	Olga Kuznetsova; Russia	Yuliya Kosenkova; Russia

== Results ==
=== Heats ===
First 3 of each heat (Q) and the next 3 fastest (q) qualified for the final.

Rank	Heat	Name	Nationality	Time	Notes
1	2	Yuliya Kosenkova	Russia	4:13.28	Q
2	2	Sinead Delahunty	Ireland	4:13.94	Q
3	1	Violeta Szekely	Romania	4:15.11	Q
4	1	Olga Kuznetsova	Russia	4:15.25	Q
5	1	Kathleen Friedrich	Germany	4:15.43	Q
6	2	Lyubov Kremlyova	Russia	4:15.88	Q
7	1	Patricia Djaté-Taillard	France	4:16.32	q
8	2	Aysen Barak	Turkey	4:17.12	q
9	2	Dorina Briand-Calenic	France	4:17.18	q, PB
10	1	Elena Buhăianu-Iagăr	Romania	4:17.64	
11	1	Sara Palmas	Italy	4:18.28	PB
	1	Rocío Rodríguez	Spain	DNF	
	2	Lidia Chojecka	Poland	DNF	
	2	Carmen Wüstenhagen	Germany	DNF	
	2	Gabriela Szabo	Romania	DNS	

=== Final ===
Rank	Name	Nationality	Time	Notes
1st place, gold medalist(s)	Violeta Szekely	Romania	4:12.82	
2nd place, silver medalist(s)	Olga Kuznetsova	Russia	4:13.45	
3rd place, bronze medalist(s)	Yuliya Kosenkova	Russia	4:13.60	
4	Sinead Delahunty	Ireland	4:15.87	
5	Patricia Djaté-Taillard	France	4:17.69	
5	Dorina Briand-Calenic	France	4:18.70	
6	Aysen Barak	Turkey	4:19.21	
	Kathleen Friedrich	Germany	DNF	
	Lyubov Kremlyova	Russia	DNF	
