= 1999 IAAF World Indoor Championships – Women's 1500 metres =

The women's 1500 metres event at the 1999 IAAF World Indoor Championships was held on March 5–6.

== Medalists ==
Gold	Silver	Bronze
Gabriela Szabo; Romania	Violeta Beclea-Szekely; Romania	Lidia Chojecka; Poland

== Results ==
=== Heats ===
First 3 of each heat (Q) and next 3 fastest (q) qualified for the final.

Rank	Heat	Name	Nationality	Time	Notes
1	1	Violeta Beclea-Szekely	Romania	4:07.66	Q
2	1	Olga Komyagina	Russia	4:08.49	Q
3	1	Lidia Chojecka	Poland	4:08.71	Q
4	1	Andrea Šuldesová	Czech Republic	4:09.00	q, PB
5	1	Rocío Rodríguez	Spain	4:13.63	q, PB
6	1	Sylvia Kühnemund	Germany	4:14.31	q
7	2	Gabriela Szabo	Romania	4:14.99	Q
8	2	Kutre Dulecha	Ethiopia	4:15.54	Q
9	2	Svetlana Kanatova	Russia	4:15.76	Q
10	2	Judit Varga	Hungary	4:15.99	
11	2	Maite Zúñiga	Spain	4:18.70	
12	1	Yelena Gorodnicheva	Ukraine	4:19.20	
13	2	Alisa Harvey-Hill	United States	4:20.09	
14	2	Niusha Mancilla	Bolivia	4:20.16	NR
15	2	Minori Hayakari	Japan	4:25.03	

=== Final ===
Rank	Name	Nationality	Time	Notes
1st place, gold medalist(s)	Gabriela Szabo	Romania	4:03.23	CR
2nd place, silver medalist(s)	Violeta Beclea-Szekely	Romania	4:03.53	PB
3rd place, bronze medalist(s)	Lidia Chojecka	Poland	4:05.86	NR
4	Olga Komyagina	Russia	4:06.18	PB
5	Svetlana Kanatova	Russia	4:06.20	PB
6	Andrea Šuldesová	Czech Republic	4:06.37	PB
7	Rocío Rodríguez	Spain	4:10.17	PB
8	Kutre Dulecha	Ethiopia	4:11.91	
9	Sylvia Kühnemund	Germany	4:26.35	
