= 1993 IAAF World Indoor Championships – Women's 1500 metres =

The women's 1500 metres event at the 1993 IAAF World Indoor Championships was held on 13 and 14 March.

== Medalists ==
Gold	Silver	Bronze
Yekaterina Podkopayeva; Russia	Violeta Beclea; Romania	Sandra Gasser; Switzerland

== Results ==
=== Heats ===
First 4 of each heat (Q) and next 2 fastest (q) qualified for the final.

Rank	Heat	Name	Nationality	Time	Notes
1	1	Sandra Gasser	Switzerland	4:11.42	Q
2	1	Carla Sacramento	Portugal	4:11.93	Q, NR
3	1	Paula Schnurr	Canada	4:11.97	Q
4	1	Alisa Hill	United States	4:12.04	Q
5	1	Maite Zúñiga	Spain	4:12.04	q
6	1	Małgorzata Rydz	Poland	4:12.94	q
7	2	Yekaterina Podkopayeva	Russia	4:14.81	Q
8	2	Violeta Beclea	Romania	4:14.95	Q
9	2	Anna Brzezińska	Poland	4:15.01	Q
10	2	Maria Akraka	Sweden	4:15.06	Q
11	2	Theresia Kiesl	Austria	4:16.02	
11	2	Elisa Rea	Italy	4:17.44	
12	2	Jasmin Jones	United States	4:22.34	
	1	Lyudmila Derevyankina	Kyrgyzstan	DNF	

=== Final ===
Rank	Name	Nationality	Time	Notes
1st place, gold medalist(s)	Yekaterina Podkopayeva	Russia	4:09.29	
2nd place, silver medalist(s)	Violeta Beclea	Romania	4:09.41	
3rd place, bronze medalist(s)	Sandra Gasser	Switzerland	4:10.99	
4	Anna Brzezińska	Poland	4:11.15	
5	Maite Zúñiga	Spain	4:12.67	
6	Maria Akraka	Sweden	4:13.10	
7	Carla Sacramento	Portugal	4:13.41	
8	Paula Schnurr	Canada	4:23.66	
9	Alisa Hill	United States	4:29.67	
	Małgorzata Rydz	Poland	DNF	
