= Athletics at the 1996 Summer Olympics – Women's 1500 metres =

Women's 1500 metres at the Games of the XXVI Olympiad
- Venues: Centennial Olympic Stadium
- Dates: July 31 (heats); August 1 (semi-finals); August 3 (final)
- Competitors: 32 from 23 nations
- Winning time: 4:00.83

Medalists
1st place, gold medalist(s)		Svetlana Masterkova; Russia
2nd place, silver medalist(s)		Gabriela Szabo; Romania
3rd place, bronze medalist(s)		Theresia Kiesl; Austria

These are the official results of the women's 1,500 metres event at the 1996 Summer Olympics in Atlanta, Georgia. There were a total of 32 competitors.

== Medalists ==
Gold	Svetlana Masterkova; Russia
Silver	Gabriela Szabo; Romania
Bronze	Theresia Kiesl; Austria

== Results ==
=== Heats ===
Qualification: First 6 in each heat (Q) and the next 6 fastest (q) qualified to the semifinals.

Rank	Heat	Name	Nationality	Time	Notes
1	3	Gabriela Szabo	Romania	4:07.32	Q
2	3	Kelly Holmes	Great Britain	4:07.36	Q
3	3	Regina Jacobs	United States	4:07.41	Q
4	3	Margaret Crowley	Australia	4:07.51	Q
5	3	Małgorzata Rydz	Poland	4:07.51	Q
6	3	Lyudmila Rogachova	Russia	4:07.61	Q
7	3	Kutre Dulecha	Ethiopia	4:07.69	q
8	3	Malin Ewerlöf	Sweden	4:09.06	q
9	1	Theresia Kiesl	Austria	4:09.24	Q
10	1	Svetlana Masterkova	Russia	4:09.88	Q
11	1	Hassiba Boulmerka	Algeria	4:09.96	Q
12	1	Carmen Wüstenhagen	Germany	4:10.06	Q
13	1	Sinead Delahunty	Ireland	4:10.20	Q
14	1	Gwen Griffiths	South Africa	4:10.80	Q
15	1	Anna Brzezińska	Poland	4:11.06	q
16	1	Leah Pells	Canada	4:13.17	q
17	2	Lyudmila Borisova	Russia	4:13.29	Q
18	2	Naomi Mugo	Kenya	4:13.35	Q
19	2	Carla Sacramento	Portugal	4:13.57	Q
20	2	Cătălina Gheorghiu	Romania	4:13.82	Q
21	2	Blandine Bitzner-Ducret	France	4:13.83	Q
22	2	Maite Zúñiga	Spain	4:14.05	Q
23	2	Sylvia Kühnemund	Germany	4:14.35	q
24	2	Natasha Dukhnova	Belarus	4:14.75	q
25	2	Vicki Huber	United States	4:14.82	
26	3	Marta Domínguez	Spain	4:15.00	
27	1	Frédérique Quentin	France	4:15.95	
28	2	Sonia O'Sullivan	Ireland	4:19.77	
29	2	Petya Strashilova	Bulgaria	4:26.66	
30	1	Juli Henner	United States	4:27.14	
31	3	Paula Schnurr	Canada	4:29.67	
32	1	Khin Khin Htwe	Myanmar	4:30.64	

=== Semifinals ===
Qualification: First 4 in each heat (Q) and the next 2 fastest (q) qualified to the final.

Rank	Heat	Name	Nationality	Time	Notes
1	2	Kelly Holmes	Great Britain	4:05.88	Q
2	2	Regina Jacobs	United States	4:06.13	Q
3	2	Margaret Crowley	Australia	4:06.21	Q
4	2	Leah Pells	Canada	4:06.26	Q
5	2	Carla Sacramento	Portugal	4:06.70	Q
6	2	Lyudmila Borisova	Russia	4:06.89	q
7	2	Anna Brzezińska	Poland	4:07.17	q
8	2	Kutre Dulecha	Ethiopia	4:09.03	
9	1	Theresia Kiesl	Austria	4:09.44	Q
10	1	Gabriela Szabo	Romania	4:09.83	Q
11	1	Svetlana Masterkova	Russia	4:10.35	Q
12	1	Małgorzata Rydz	Poland	4:10.77	Q
13	1	Gwen Griffiths	South Africa	4:11.12	Q
14	1	Natasha Dukhnova	Belarus	4:11.43	
15	1	Carmen Wüstenhagen	Germany	4:11.47	
16	1	Blandine Bitzner-Ducret	France	4:12.27	
17	1	Sinead Delahunty	Ireland	4:12.52	
18	2	Malin Ewerlöf	Sweden	4:13.85	
19	1	Maite Zúñiga	Spain	4:14.10	
20	1	Lyudmila Rogachova	Russia	4:14.54	
21	2	Sylvia Kühnemund	Germany	4:16.85	
22	2	Naomi Mugo	Kenya	4:20.01	
23	1	Hassiba Boulmerka	Algeria	4:23.86	
	2	Cătălina Gheorghiu	Romania	DQ	

=== Final ===
Rank	Name	Nationality	Time	Notes
1st place, gold medalist(s)	Svetlana Masterkova	Russia	4:00.83	
2nd place, silver medalist(s)	Gabriela Szabo	Romania	4:01.54	
3rd place, bronze medalist(s)	Theresia Kiesl	Austria	4:03.02	
4	Leah Pells	Canada	4:03.56	
5	Margaret Crowley	Australia	4:03.79	
6	Carla Sacramento	Portugal	4:03.91	
7	Lyudmila Borisova	Russia	4:03.56	
8	Małgorzata Rydz	Poland	4:05.92	
9	Gwen Griffiths	South Africa	4:06.33	
10	Regina Jacobs	United States	4:07.21	
11	Kelly Holmes	Great Britain	4:07.46	
12	Anna Brzezińska	Poland	4:08.27	

== See also ==
- Men's 1500 metres
