= Athletics at the 2004 Summer Olympics – Women's 1500 metres =

Women's 1500 metres at the Games of the XXVIII Olympiad
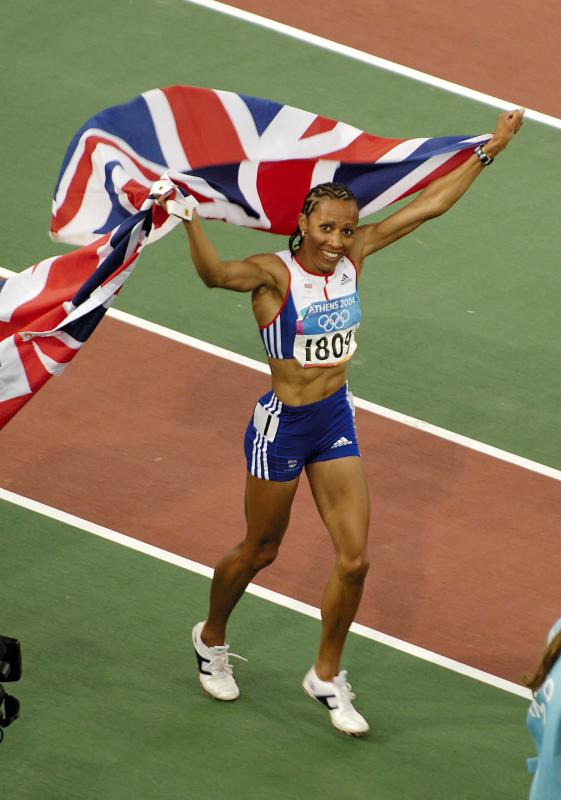
- Winner Kelly Holmes.
- Venue: Athens Olympic Stadium
- Dates: 24–28 August
- Competitors: 48 from 25 nations
- Winning time: 3:57.90 NR

Medalists
| 1st place, gold medalist(s) | | Kelly Holmes | Great Britain |
| 2nd place, silver medalist(s) | | Tatyana Tomashova | Russia |
| 3rd place, bronze medalist(s) | | Maria Cioncan | Romania |

The women's 1500 metres at the 2004 Summer Olympics as part of the athletics program were held at the Athens Olympic Stadium from August 24 to 28.

The first round comprised three heats with the first five gaining a direct qualification and then the next nine fastest across all heats progressing to the semifinals. The top five runners in each of the two semifinal heats moved on directly to the final, and they were immediately joined by the next two fastest from any of the semifinals.

The final started out quickly with the fastest qualifier Natalya Yevdokimova taking an insurmountable lead for the Russians alongside her teammates Olga Yegorova and reigning world champion Tatyana Tomashova. Great Britain's Kelly Holmes, who had earlier won the gold medal in the 800 metres, was expected to challenge her Russian rivals and the rest of the field for a possible Olympic double. Throughout the race, Holmes stayed calmly at the back of the field, lying eighth at the bell. With only one more lap to go, she bided her time to pull away from the rest of the runners through the curve, keeping an eye on the leaders. Holmes made a wider move with only 100 metres remaining to pass the leader Tomashova and sprinted down the home stretch to take the gold medal, setting a new British record of 3:57.90. Tomashova closed the race quickly to get the silver, while Romania's Maria Cioncan could not reach further to chase the leaders on a tight sprint finish, ending her up with a bronze.

Holmes' feat made her one of Great Britain's most successful athletes in Olympic history, and the first to achieve an Olympic middle-distance double by either a male or a female, for 84 years, a feat not accomplished by the 1980s running legends Sebastian Coe, Steve Ovett, and Steve Cram.

== Records ==
Prior to the competition, the existing World record, Olympic record, and world leading time were as follows:

| World record | Qu Yunxia (CHN) | 3:50.46 | Beijing, China | 11 September 1993 |
| Olympic record | Paula Ivan (ROM) | 3:53.96 | Seoul, South Korea | 1 October 1988 |
| World Leading | Elvan Abeylegesse (TUR) | 3:58.28 | Moscow, Russia | 30 May 2004 |

No new records were set during the competition.

== Qualification ==
The qualification period for athletics was 1 January 2003 to 9 August 2004. For the women's 1500 metres, each National Olympic Committee was permitted to enter up to three athletes that had run the race in 4:05.80 or faster during the qualification period. If an NOC had no athletes that qualified under that standard, one athlete that had run the race in 4:07.15 or faster could be entered.

== Schedule ==
All times are Eastern European Summer Time (UTC+3)

| Date | Time | Round |
|---|---|---|
| Tuesday, 24 August 2004 | 20:30 | Round 1 |
| Thursday, 26 August 2004 | 20:30 | Semifinals |
| Saturday, 28 August 2004 | 20:30 | Final |

== Results ==
=== Round 1 ===
Qualification rule: The first five finishers in each heat (Q) plus the next nine fastest overall runners (q) advanced to the semifinals.

==== Heat 1 ====
| Rank | Athlete | Nation | Time | Notes |
|---|---|---|---|---|
| 1 | Tatyana Tomashova | Russia | 4:06.06 | Q |
| 2 | Nataliya Tobias | Ukraine | 4:06.06 | Q |
| 3 | Nuria Fernández | Spain | 4:06.29 | Q |
| 4 | Anna Jakubczak | Poland | 4:06.37 | Q |
| 5 | Elvan Abeylegesse | Turkey | 4:06.42 | Q |
| 6 | Carrie Tollefson | United States | 4:06.46 | q |
| 7 | Hayley Tullett | Great Britain | 4:07.27 | q |
| 8 | Carla Sacramento | Portugal | 4:07.73 | q |
| 9 | Courtney Babcock | Canada | 4:08.18 | |
| 10 | Latifa Essarokh | France | 4:09.08 | |
| 11 | Mestawat Tadesse | Ethiopia | 4:11.78 | |
| 12 | Elena Iagăr | Romania | 4:11.48 | |
| 13 | Silvia Felipo | Andorra | 4:44.40 | SB |
| 14 | Sloan Siegrist | Guam | 4:44.53 | |
| | Bouchra Ghezielle | Morocco | DNS | |
| | Nouria Merah Benida | Algeria | DNS | |

==== Heat 2 ====
| Rank | Athlete | Nation | Time | Notes |
|---|---|---|---|---|
| 1 | Natalya Yevdokimova | Russia | 4:05.55 | Q |
| 2 | Kelly Holmes | Great Britain | 4:05.58 | Q |
| 3 | Daniela Yordanova | Bulgaria | 4:05.87 | Q, SB |
| 4 | Maria Martins | France | 4:05.95 | Q |
| 5 | Hasna Benhassi | Morocco | 4:05.98 | Q |
| 6 | Lidia Chojecka | Poland | 4:06.13 | q |
| 7 | Iris Fuentes-Pila | Spain | 4:06.32 | q |
| 8 | Nahida Touhami | Algeria | 4:06.41 | q |
| 9 | Konstadina Efedaki | Greece | 4:06.73 | q |
| 10 | Malindi Elmore | Canada | 4:09.81 | |
| 11 | Jasminka Guber | Bosnia and Herzegovina | 4:17.75 | PB |
| 12 | Meskerem Legesse | Ethiopia | 4:18.03 | |
| 13 | Alina Cucerzan | Romania | 4:18.07 | |
| 14 | Elena Guerra | Uruguay | 4:35.31 | |
| 15 | Kanchhi Maya Koju | Nepal | 4:38.17 | PB |
| | Iryna Lishchynska | Ukraine | DNF | |

==== Heat 3 ====
| Rank | Athlete | Nation | Time | Notes |
|---|---|---|---|---|
| 1 | Maria Cioncan | Romania | 4:06.68 | Q |
| 2 | Carmen Douma-Hussar | Canada | 4:06.90 | Q |
| 3 | Wioletta Janowska | Poland | 4:06.91 | Q |
| 4 | Nancy Jebet Lagat | Kenya | 4:06.94 | Q |
| 5 | Kutre Dulecha | Ethiopia | 4:06.95 | Q |
| 6 | Olga Yegorova | Russia | 4:07.14 | q |
| 7 | Natalia Rodríguez | Spain | 4:07.19 | q |
| 8 | Hind Dehiba | France | 4:07.96 | |
| 9 | Nelya Neporadna | Ukraine | 4:08.60 | |
| 10 | Trine Pilskog | Norway | 4:08.61 | |
| 11 | Sarah Jamieson | Australia | 4:09.25 | |
| 12 | Judit Varga | Hungary | 4:09.36 | |
| 13 | Joanne Pavey | Great Britain | 4:12.50 | |
| 14 | Tatiana Borisova | Kyrgyzstan | 4:13.36 | |
| 15 | Sumaira Zahoor | Pakistan | 4:49.33 | |
| | Rosa Saul | Angola | DNS | |

=== Semifinals ===
Qualification rule: The top five finishers in each heat (Q) plus the next two fastest overall runners (q) advanced to the final.

==== Semifinal 1 ====
| Rank | Athlete | Nation | Time | Notes |
|---|---|---|---|---|
| 1 | Maria Cioncan | Romania | 4:06.69 | Q |
| 2 | Anna Jakubczak | Poland | 4:06.77 | Q |
| 3 | Tatyana Tomashova | Russia | 4:06.80 | Q |
| 4 | Elvan Abeylegesse | Turkey | 4:07.10 | Q |
| 5 | Hasna Benhassi | Morocco | 4:07.39 | Q |
| 6 | Nataliya Tobias | Ukraine | 4:07.55 | |
| 7 | Nancy Jebet Lagat | Kenya | 4:07.57 | |
| 8 | Kutre Dulecha | Ethiopia | 4:07.63 | |
| 9 | Nuria Fernández | Spain | 4:07.68 | |
| 10 | Iris Fuentes-Pila | Spain | 4:07.69 | |
| 11 | Hayley Tullett | Great Britain | 4:08.92 | |
| 12 | Konstadina Efedaki | Greece | 4:09.37 | |

==== Semifinal 2 ====
| Rank | Athlete | Nation | Time | Notes |
|---|---|---|---|---|
| 1 | Natalya Yevdokimova | Russia | 4:04.66 | Q |
| 2 | Kelly Holmes | Great Britain | 4:04.77 | Q |
| 3 | Lidia Chojecka | Poland | 4:04.83 | Q |
| 4 | Natalia Rodríguez | Spain | 4:04.91 | Q |
| 5 | Daniela Yordanova | Bulgaria | 4:04.94 | Q, SB |
| 6 | Carmen Douma-Hussar | Canada | 4:05.09 | q |
| 7 | Olga Yegorova | Russia | 4:05.57 | q |
| 8 | Nahida Touhami | Algeria | 4:07.21 | |
| 9 | Carrie Tollefson | United States | 4:08.55 | |
| 10 | Carla Sacramento | Portugal | 4:10.85 | |
| 11 | Wioletta Janowska | Poland | 4:11.41 | |
| 12 | Maria Martins | France | 4:12.76 | |

=== Final ===
| Rank | Athlete | Nation | Time | Notes |
|---|---|---|---|---|
| 1st place, gold medalist(s) | Kelly Holmes | Great Britain | 3:57.90 | NR |
| 2nd place, silver medalist(s) | Tatyana Tomashova | Russia | 3:58.12 | PB |
| 3rd place, bronze medalist(s) | Maria Cioncan | Romania | 3:58.39 | PB |
| 4 | Natalya Yevdokimova | Russia | 3:59.05 | PB |
| 5 | Daniela Yordanova | Bulgaria | 3:59.10 | PB |
| 6 | Lidia Chojecka | Poland | 3:59.27 | SB |
| 7 | Anna Jakubczak | Poland | 4:00.15 | PB |
| 8 | Elvan Abeylegesse | Turkey | 4:00.67 | |
| 9 | Carmen Douma-Hussar | Canada | 4:02.31 | PB |
| 10 | Natalia Rodríguez | Spain | 4:03.01 | SB |
| 11 | Olga Yegorova | Russia | 4:05.65 | |
| 12 | Hasna Benhassi | Morocco | 4:12.90 | |
