= 1995 IAAF World Indoor Championships – Women's 1500 metres =

The women's 1500 metres event at the 1995 IAAF World Indoor Championships was held on 12 March.

== Doping disqualifications ==
Lyubov Kremlyova of Russia, who originally finished third, and Violeta Beclea (ROU), who originally finished fourth, were both disqualified for doping.

The bronze medal was awarded to Maite Zúñiga of Spain.

== Results ==
Rank	Name	Nationality	Time	Notes
1st place, gold medalist(s)	Regina Jacobs	United States	4:12.61	
2nd place, silver medalist(s)	Carla Sacramento	Portugal	4:13.02	
3rd place, bronze medalist(s)	Maite Zúñiga	Spain	4:16.63	
4	Kristen Seabury	United States	4:16.77	
5	Yvonne van der Kolk	Netherlands	4:17.00	
6	Paula Schnurr	Canada	4:19.26	
7	Lynn Gibson	Great Britain	4:20.85	
8	Carmen Arrúa	Argentina	4:31.15	
9	Lilian López	Paraguay	5:05.10	NR
	Marina Bastos	Portugal	DNS	
(3)	Lyubov Kremlyova	Russia	DQ (4:13.19)	Doping
(4)	Violeta Beclea	Romania	DQ (4:16.32)	Doping
