= Athletics at the 1997 Summer Universiade – Women's 1500 metres =

The women's 1500 metres event at the 1997 Summer Universiade was held on 30 and 31 August at the Stadio Cibali in Catania, Italy.

== Medalists ==
Gold	Silver	Bronze
Gabriela Szabo; Romania	Carla Sacramento; Portugal	Lidia Chojecka; Poland

== Results ==
=== Heats ===
Rank	Heat	Athlete	Nationality	Time	Notes
1	2	Gabriela Szabo	Romania	4:12.59	Q
2	2	Lidia Chojecka	Poland	4:12.82	Q
3	2	Kathy Butler	Canada	4:13.13	Q
4	2	Miesha Marzell	United States	4:13.38	Q
5	2	Carlien Cornelissen	South Africa	4:13.54	Q
6	2	Kumiko Okamoto	Japan	4:16.94	q
7	1	Luminiţa Gogârlea	Romania	4:19.01	Q
8	1	Carla Sacramento	Portugal	4:19.24	Q
9	1	Hayley Parry	United Kingdom	4:19.56	Q
10	1	Mélanie Choinière	Canada	4:19.70	Q
11	1	Marjana Zajfrid	Slovenia	4:20.43	Q
12	2	Veslemøy Hausken	Norway	4:20.51	q
13	1	Samira Raïf	Morocco	4:21.02	
14	2	Svetlana Svekla	Moldova	4:22.62	
15	2	Susana Estiveira	Portugal	4:23.31	
16	2	Chan-Ropper Man Yee	Hong Kong	4:25.39	
17	1	Sylvia Kühnemund	Germany	4:27.83	
18	2	Susana Rebolledo	Chile	4:28.79	
19	1	Natalia Cercheș	Moldova	4:30.30	
20	2	Niamh Beirne	Ireland	4:31.09	
21	1	Mari-Luise Henning	South Africa	4:35.83	
22	2	Marques Sylla Kensa	Guinea	5:46.22	
	?	Stine Larsen	Norway	DNF	

=== Final ===
Rank	Athlete	Nationality	Time	Notes
1st place, gold medalist(s)	Gabriela Szabo	Romania	4:10.31	
2nd place, silver medalist(s)	Carla Sacramento	Portugal	4:10.40	
3rd place, bronze medalist(s)	Lidia Chojecka	Poland	4:12.38	
4	Hayley Parry	United Kingdom	4:13.26	
5	Kathy Butler	Canada	4:13.27	
6	Luminiţa Gogârlea	Romania	4:13.44	
7	Miesha Marzell	United States	4:13.62	
8	Mélanie Choinière	Canada	4:14.71	
9	Carlien Cornelissen	South Africa	4:16.20	
10	Kumiko Okamoto	Japan	4:17.32	
11	Marjana Zajfrid	Slovenia	4:18.08	
12	Veslemøy Hausken	Norway	4:29.19	
