= Maria Cioncan =

Romanian middle-distance runner

Medal record

Women's athletics

Representing Romania

2004 Olympic Games
Bronze medal – third place	Women's 1,500 metres	1500 m

Maria Cioncan (19 June 1977 – 21 January 2007) was a middle-distance runner from Romania, best known for winning a bronze medal in the 1500 metres event at the 2004 Summer Olympics.

== Life ==
Born in Maieru, she set personal bests in both 800 and 1500 metres during the games. Her 2005 season was cut short, and her only notable competition appearance was at the SPAR European Cup in Firenze, Italy where she won the 800 (2:00.88) and placed second in the 1500 (4:07.39). Cioncan's last competition on the top international level was the 2006 World Indoor Championships, where she failed to progress past the first heat of the 800m. Earlier that indoor season she ran an indoor personal best of 2:01.70.

On 21 January 2007 Cioncan died in a car accident near Pleven, Bulgaria. She was returning from a training camp in Greece when her vehicle flipped over and struck a tree, killing her instantly. The cause of the accident was a double blowout in the right front tire, the car not going more than 90 km/h.

== Achievements ==
Year	Competition	Venue	Position	Event	Notes
Representing Romania
1999	European U23 Championships	Gothenburg, Sweden	–	800 m	DNF
1999	European U23 Championships	Gothenburg, Sweden	7th	1500 m	4:14.00
2001	World Indoor Championships	Lisbon, Portugal	16th (h)	1500 m	4:17.47
2002	European Indoor Championships	Vienna, Austria	11th	3000 m	9:08.07
2003	World Indoor Championships	Birmingham, United Kingdom	16th (h)	1500 m	4:14.52
2003	World Championships	Paris, France	9th (sf)	800 m	2:00.72
2003	World Championships	Paris, France	9th	1500 m	4:02.80
2004	Olympic Games	Athens, Greece	7th	800 m	1:59.62
2004	Olympic Games	Athens, Greece	3rd	1500 m	3:58.39
2004	World Athletics Final	Monte Carlo, Monaco	8th	800 m	2:04.55
2004	World Athletics Final	Monte Carlo, Monaco	10th	1500 m	4:08.09
2006	World Indoor Championships	Moscow, Russia	16th (h)	800 m	2:05.17

=== Personal bests ===
- 800 metres - 1:59.44 min (2004)
- 1500 metres - 3:58.39 min (2004)
- 3000 metres - 8:57.71 min (2002)
