= 1999 European Athletics U23 Championships – Women's 1500 metres =

The women's 1500 metres event at the 1999 European Athletics U23 Championships was held in Gothenburg, Sweden, at Ullevi on 29 and 31 July 1999.

== Medalists ==
Gold	Lidia Chojecka; Poland
Silver	Yelena Zadorozhnaya; Russia
Bronze	Anca Safta; Romania

== Results ==
=== Final ===
31 July

Rank	Name	Nationality	Time	Notes
1st place, gold medalist(s)	Lidia Chojecka	Poland	4:07.86	CR
2nd place, silver medalist(s)	Yelena Zadorozhnaya	Russia	4:09.03	
3rd place, bronze medalist(s)	Anca Safta	Romania	4:09.78	
4	Natalia Rodríguez	Spain	4:10.65	
5	Alesya Turova	Belarus	4:13.79	
6	Cristina Valcarcel	Spain	4:13.93	
7	Maria Cioncan	Romania	4:14.00	
8	Rocío Rodríguez	Spain	4:15.61	
9	Kristin Ahlepil	Sweden	4:17.63	
10	Brigitta Tusai	Hungary	4:19.00	
	Kathleen Friedrich	Germany	DNF	
	Yuliya Kumpan	Ukraine	DNF	

=== Heats ===
29 July
Qualified: first 4 in each heat and 4 best to the Final

==== Heat 1 ====
Rank	Name	Nationality	Time	Notes
1	Lidia Chojecka	Poland	4:15.67	Q
2	Kathleen Friedrich	Germany	4:16.10	Q
3	Anca Safta	Romania	4:17.19	Q
4	Natalia Rodríguez	Spain	4:17.61	Q
5	Yuliya Kumpan	Ukraine	4:17.79	q
6	Cristina Valcarcel	Spain	4:18.36	q
7	Rasa Michniovaitė	Lithuania	4:20.38	
8	Endija Rezgale	Latvia	4:21.93	
9	Maria Lynch	Ireland	4:22.01	

==== Heat 2 ====
Rank	Name	Nationality	Time	Notes
1	Yelena Zadorozhnaya	Russia	4:14.85	Q
2	Alesya Turova	Belarus	4:14.99	Q
3	Maria Cioncan	Romania	4:15.37	Q
4	Rocío Rodríguez	Spain	4:16.08	Q
5	Kristin Ahlepil	Sweden	4:16.80	q
6	Brigitta Tusai	Hungary	4:16.98	q
7	Süreyya Ayhan	Turkey	4:20.28	
8	Susan Scott	Great Britain	4:21.44	

== Participation ==
According to an unofficial count, 17 athletes from 14 countries participated in the event.

- Belarus (1)
- Germany (1)
- Great Britain (1)
- Hungary (1)
- Ireland (1)
- Latvia (1)
- Lithuania (1)
- Poland (1)
- Romania (2)
- Russia (1)
- Spain (3)
- Sweden (1)
- Turkey (1)
- Ukraine (1)
