= Cătălina Gheorghiu =

Romanian middle-distance runner

Personal information
- Nationality: Romanian
- Born: 21 June 1969 (age 57)
- Height: 1.76 m (5 ft 9 in)

Sport
- Sport: Middle-distance running
- Events: 800 metres (early); 1500 metres (later)

Cătălina Gheorghiu (born 21 June 1969) is a Romanian middle-distance runner. She competed in the at the 1996 Summer Olympics.

Specializing in the 800 metres at a young age, she won the silver medals at both the 1987 European Athletics Championships and the 1988 World Junior Championships. She also competed individually at the 1987 World Championships without reaching the final, and was on the team that finished sixth in the 4 × 400 metres relay at the 1988 World Junior Championships. In 1989 she recorded lifetime bests of 2:00.02 minutes in the 800 metres and 4:06.94 minutes in the 1500 metres, both achieved in June and July in Bucureşti.

Over the next years, she competed less on the highest international level, but finished sixth at the 1991 Summer Universiade and also competed at the 1995 Summer Universiade.

Gheorghiu then returned to the world elite and finished fourth at the 1996 European Athletics Championships, reached the semi-final at the 1996 Summer Olympics and finished sixth at the 1997 World Indoor Championships.

Domestically and regionally, Gheorghiu won the Romanian championships in the 800 metres (1995) and 3000 metres steeplechase (1991, 1992). She won the 1500 metres at the 1989 Balkan Championships as well as at the 1996 and 1997 Balkan Indoor Championships.
