= Lidia Chojecka =

Polish middle-distance runner

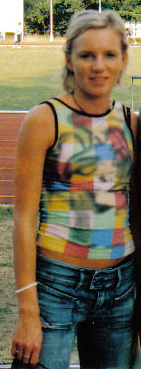
- Chojecka in 2007

Personal information
- Born: 25 January 1977 (age 49) Siedlce, Poland

Sport
- Country: Poland
- Sport: Track and field
- Events: 1500 metres, 3000 metres
- Retired: 2013
Medal record
Women's athletics
Representing Poland
World Indoor Championships
Bronze medal – third place	1997 Paris	1500 m
Bronze medal – third place	1999 Maebashi	1500 m
Bronze medal – third place	2006 Moscow	3000 m
European Indoor Championships
Gold medal – first place	2005 Madrid	3000 m
Gold medal – first place	2007 Birmingham	1500 m
Gold medal – first place	2007 Birmingham	3000 m
Silver medal – second place	1998 Valencia	1500 m
Silver medal – second place	2000 Ghent	3000 m
Silver medal – second place	2011 Paris	3000 m
European U23 Championships
Gold medal – first place	1999 Gothenburg	1500 m
Silver medal – second place	1997 Turku	1500 m
European U20 Championships
Gold medal – first place	1995 Nyíregyháza	1500 m

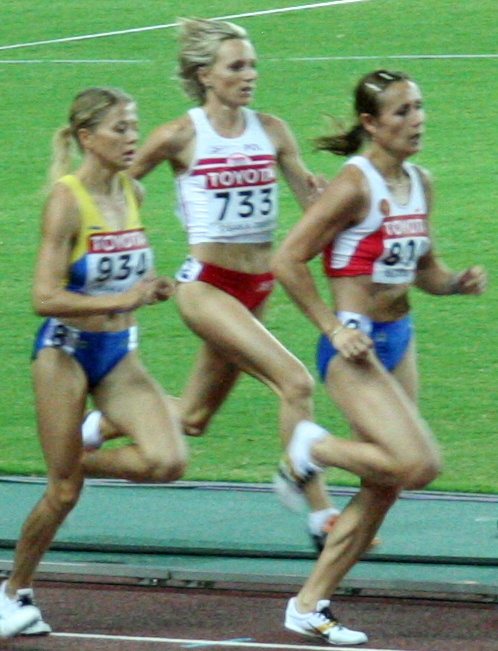
Chojecka (center) races in the 1500 m final of the 2007 World Championships in Osaka, with Nataliya Tobias (L) and Yuliya Fomenko (R).

Lidia Chojecka-Leandro (born 25 January 1977) is a retired Polish middle- and long-distance runner who mainly competed in the 1500 metres and 3000 metres. She won bronze medals in the 1500 m at the 1997 and 1999 World Indoor Championships, and the 3000 m at the 2006 World Indoor Championships. Chojecka is a six-time European Indoor Championships medallist in the 1500 m and 3000 m events, earning three golds and three silvers. She took the double at the 2007 European Indoor Championships, becoming the first runner, male or female, to win both events at the same championships. She had been one of the most consistent middle-distance runners in Europe throughout the 1990s, and finished fifth and sixth in back-to-back Olympic 1500 m finals in 2000 and 2004.

As an 18-year old, Chojecka won the 1500 m at the 1995 European Under-20 Championships. She placed second in the event at the 1997 European U23 Championships and took gold two years later. As of 2022 Chojecka held eight Polish national records in distances ranging from 1000 to 5000 metres (1000 m indoor, 1500 m out and indoor, one mile indoor, 2000 m, 3000 m out and indoor and 5000 m). She won five Polish outdoor (1500 m, 5000 m, 10,000 m) and 13 indoor (800 m, 1500 m, 3000 m) titles.

Her husband and former coach is a Gabonese-born runner, Jean-Marc Léandro.

== Achievements ==
=== Personal bests ===
- 800 metres – 1:59.97 (Nuremberg 1999)
  - 800 metres indoor – 1:59.99 (Birmingham 1999)
- 1000 metres – 2:42.89 (Sopot 1994) NU18R
  - 1000 metres indoor – 2:36.97 (Liévin 2003) NR
- 1500 metres – 3:59.22 (Oslo 2000) NR
  - 1500 metres indoor – 4:03.58 (Birmingham 2003) NR
- One mile – 4:25.18 (Lausanne 1998)
  - One mile indoor – 4:24.44 (Stuttgart 2000) NR
- 2000 metres – 5:38.44 (Brussels 2009) NR
- 3000 metres – 8:31.69 (Brussels 2002) NR
  - 3000 metres indoor – 8:38.21 (Stuttgart 2007) NR
- 5000 metres – 15:04.88 (Berlin 2002) NR
- 10,000 metres – 32:55.10 (Warsaw 2007)

=== National titles ===
- Polish Athletics Championships
  - 1500 m: 1999, 2000, 2002
  - 5000 m: 2011
  - 10,000 m: 2007
- Polish Indoor Athletics Championships
  - 800 m: 1999, 2004
  - 1500 m: 1998, 1999, 2000, 2004, 2006, 2009
  - 3000 m: 2000, 2001, 2003, 2005, 2007

=== International competitions ===
Representing Poland
Year	Competition	Venue	Position	Event	Result
1994	World Junior Championships	Lisbon, Portugal	7th	1500 m	4:18.70
1995	European Junior Championships	Nyíregyháza, Hungary	1st	1500 m	4:17.29
1996	World Junior Championships	Sydney, Australia	5th	1500 m	4:11.36
1997	World Indoor Championships	Paris, France	3rd	1500 m	4:06.25
1997	European U23 Championships	Turku, Finland	2nd	1500 m	4:14.70
1997	Universiade	Catania, Italy	3rd	1500 m	4:12.38
1998	European Indoor Championships	Valencia, Spain	2nd	1500 m	4:14.93
1998	European Championships	Budapest, Hungary	6th	1500 m	4:15.00
1999	World Indoor Championships	Maebashi, Japan	3rd	1500 m	4:05.86
1999	European U23 Championships	Gothenburg, Sweden	1st	1500 m	4:07.86
1999	World Championships	Seville, Spain	9th	1500 m	4:05.55
2000	European Indoor Championships	Ghent, Belgium	–	1500 m	DNF
2000	European Indoor Championships	Ghent, Belgium	2nd	3000 m	8:42.42
2000	Olympic Games	Sydney, Australia	5th	1500 m	4:06.42
2001	World Championships	Edmonton, Canada	5th	1500 m	4:06.70
2001	Goodwill Games	Brisbane, Australia	4th	Mile	4:39.96
2002	European Championships	Munich, Germany	9th	1500 m	4:10.56
2003	World Indoor Championships	Birmingham, United Kingdom	10th (h)	1500 m	4:10.51
2004	World Indoor Championships	Budapest, Hungary	8th	1500 m	4:10.32
2004	Olympic Games	Athens, Greece	6th	1500 m	3:59.27
2004	World Athletics Final	Monte Carlo, Monaco	7th	1500 m	4:06.62
2004	World Athletics Final	Monte Carlo, Monaco	2nd	3000 m	8:39.16
2005	European Indoor Championships	Madrid, Spain	1st	3000 m	8:43.76
2006	World Indoor Championships	Moscow, Russia	3rd	3000 m	8:42.59
2006	European Championships	Gothenburg, Sweden	5th	1500 m	4:01.43
2006	World Athletics Final	Stuttgart, Germany	6th	1500 m	4:07.20
2006	World Cup	Athens, Greece	5th	1500 m	4:06.52
2006	World Cup	Athens, Greece	2nd	3000 m	8:39.69
2007	European Indoor Championships	Birmingham, United Kingdom	1st	1500 m	4:05.13
2007	European Indoor Championships	Birmingham, United Kingdom	1st	3000 m	8:43.25
2007	World Championships	Osaka, Japan	8th	1500 m	4:08.64
2008	Olympic Games	Beijing, China	31st (h)	1500 m	4:19.57
2009	European Indoor Championships	Turin, Italy	6th	1500 m	4:15.90
2009	European Indoor Championships	Turin, Italy	–	3000 m	DNF
2009	World Championships	Berlin, Germany	7th	1500 m	4:07.17
2010	World Indoor Championships	Doha, Qatar	11th	3000 m	9:07.80
2010	European Championships	Barcelona, Spain	–	5000 m	DNF
2011	European Indoor Championships	Paris, France	2nd	3000 m	8:58.30
2012	World Indoor Championships	Istanbul, Turkey	6th	3000 m	8:56.86
2012	European Championships	Helsinki, Finland	25th (h)	1500 m	4:20.66

== See also ==
- Polish records in athletics
