= 1997 European Athletics U23 Championships – Women's 1500 metres =

The women's 1500 metres event at the 1997 European Athletics U23 Championships was held in Turku, Finland, on 12 July 1997.

== Medalists ==
Gold	Andrea Šuldesová; Czech Republic
Silver	Lidia Chojecka; Poland
Bronze	Natalya Chernyshova; Ukraine

== Results ==
=== Final ===
12 July

Rank	Name	Nationality	Time	Notes
1st place, gold medalist(s)	Andrea Šuldesová	Czech Republic	4:13.92	
2nd place, silver medalist(s)	Lidia Chojecka	Poland	4:14.70	
3rd place, bronze medalist(s)	Natalya Chernyshova	Ukraine	4:15.43	
4	Oksana Zheleznyak	Russia	4:16.20	
5	Marta Domínguez	Spain	4:16.95	
6	Brigitta Tusai	Hungary	4:17.17	
7	Doreen Walter	Germany	4:17.48	
8	Céline Rajot	France	4:18.03	
9	Cristina Grosu	Romania	4:19.48	
10	Rocío Rodríguez	Spain	4:19.68	
11	Anna Łopaciuch	Poland	4:19.85	
12	Maria Ungureanu	Romania	4:20.07	
13	Hanne Lyngstad	Norway	4:20.93	
14	Micaela Allen	Italy	4:21.05	
15	Sara Palmas	Italy	4:24.00	
16	Rashida Khayrutdinova	Russia	4:24.78	

== Participation ==
According to an unofficial count, 16 athletes from 11 countries participated in the event.

- Czech Republic (1)
- France (1)
- Germany (1)
- Hungary (1)
- Italy (2)
- Norway (1)
- Poland (2)
- Romania (2)
- Russia (2)
- Spain (2)
- Ukraine (1)
