= 1990 World Junior Championships in Athletics – Women's 1500 metres =

The women's 1500 metres event at the 1990 World Junior Championships in Athletics was held in Plovdiv, Bulgaria, at Deveti Septemvri Stadium on 11 and 12 August.

== Medalists ==
Gold	Qu Yunxia; China
Silver	Claudia Mirela Bortoi; Romania
Bronze	Malin Ewerlöf; Sweden

== Results ==
=== Final ===
12 August

Rank	Name	Nationality	Time	Notes
1st place, gold medalist(s)	Qu Yunxia	China	4:13.67	
2nd place, silver medalist(s)	Claudia Mirela Bortoi	Romania	4:14.19	
3rd place, bronze medalist(s)	Malin Ewerlöf	Sweden	4:14.61	
4	Carla Sacramento	Portugal	4:15.29	
5	Liu Li	China	4:17.81	
6	Céline Martin	France	4:18.04	
7	Yelena Mostovaya	Soviet Union	4:18.10	
8	Suzy Walsham	Australia	4:19.23	
9	Olga Yegorova	Soviet Union	4:19.90	
10	Marina Bastos	Portugal	4:20.92	
11	Caroline Kwambai	Kenya	4:22.08	
12	Egigayehu Worku	Ethiopia	4:22.89	
13	Natalie Tait	United Kingdom	4:28.80	
14	Anna Gunasekera	Canada	4:31.50	
15	Najat Ouali	Morocco	4:34.72	

=== Heats ===
11 August

==== Heat 1 ====
Rank	Name	Nationality	Time	Notes
1	Liu Li	China	4:22.53	Q
2	Claudia Mirela Bortoi	Romania	4:22.60	Q
3	Marina Bastos	Portugal	4:23.27	Q
4	Suzy Walsham	Australia	4:23.66	Q
5	Egigayehu Worku	Ethiopia	4:23.89	q
6	Claire Forbes	United Kingdom	4:24.36	
7	Olga Sheleva	Bulgaria	4:24.72	
8	Christine Stief	West Germany	4:25.24	
9	Maria Teresa Tonziello	Italy	4:31.23	
10	Melrose Mansaray	Sierra Leone	4:46.03	
11	Khadija Mohamed	Somalia	5:02.16	

==== Heat 2 ====
Rank	Name	Nationality	Time	Notes
1	Céline Martin	France	4:22.15	Q
2	Qu Yunxia	China	4:22.44	Q
3	Yelena Mostovaya	Soviet Union	4:22.50	Q
4	Carla Sacramento	Portugal	4:22.82	Q
5	Najat Ouali	Morocco	4:23.96	q
6	Caroline Kwambai	Kenya	4:24.19	q
7	Sinéad Delahunty	Ireland	4:27.15	
8	Emebet Shiferaw	Ethiopia	4:31.00	
9	Elizabeth Tungaraza	Tanzania	4:49.89	

==== Heat 3 ====
Rank	Name	Nationality	Time	Notes
1	Natalie Tait	United Kingdom	4:25.98	Q
2	Malin Ewerlöf	Sweden	4:26.01	Q
3	Olga Yegorova	Soviet Union	4:26.29	Q
4	Anna Gunasekera	Canada	4:27.28	Q
5	Lina Chesire	Kenya	4:27.30	
6	Katja Kowald	West Germany	4:27.35	
7	Liliana Salageanu	Romania	4:29.39	
8	Irma Betancourt	Mexico	4:29.60	
9	Yumi Osaki	Japan	4:29.66	
10	Alena Gresaková	Czechoslovakia	4:30.89	
11	Monica Samila	Tanzania	4:54.22	

== Participation ==
According to an unofficial count, 31 athletes from 22 countries participated in the event.

- Australia (1)
- Bulgaria (1)
- Canada (1)
- China (2)
- Czechoslovakia (1)
- Ethiopia (2)
- France (1)
- Ireland (1)
- Italy (1)
- Japan (1)
- Kenya (2)
- Mexico (1)
- Morocco (1)
- Portugal (2)
- Romania (2)
- Sierra Leone (1)
- Somalia (1)
- Soviet Union (2)
- Sweden (1)
- Tanzania (2)
- United Kingdom (2)
- West Germany (2)
