= Paula Schnurr =

Canadian middle-distance runner

Personal information
- Born: January 15, 1964 (age 62) Kirkland Lake, Ontario, Canada
- Height: 1.60 m (5 ft 3 in)
- Weight: 54 kg (119 lb)

Sport
- Sport: Athletics
- Event: 1500 m
- Club: HOC
Medal record
Representing Canada
Commonwealth Games
Silver medal – second place	1994 Victoria	1500 m

Paula Schnurr (born January 15, 1964) is a retired Canadian middle-distance runner who competed primarily in the 1500 meters. She represented her country at the 1992 and 1996 Summer Olympics as well as two indoor World Championships. In addition, she won the silver medal at the 1994 Commonwealth Games.

== Competition record ==
Year	Competition	Venue	Position	Event	Notes
Representing Canada
1989	Jeux de la Francophonie	Casablanca, Morocco	3rd	1500 m	4:16.12
1989	Universiade	Duisburg, West Germany	14th	3000 m	9:17.57
1992	Olympic Games	Barcelona, Spain	13th (sf)	1500 m	4:04.80
1993	World Indoor Championships	Toronto, Ontario, Canada	8th	1500 m	4:23.66
1994	Commonwealth Games	Victoria, British Columbia, Canada	2nd	1500 m	4:09.65
1995	World Indoor Championships	Barcelona, Spain	6th	1500 m	4:19.26
1996	Olympic Games	Atlanta, United States	31st (h)	1500 m	4:29.67

== Personal bests ==
Outdoor

- 800 meters – 2:03.00 (Windsor 1996)
- 1500 meters – 4:04.80 (Barcelona 1992)
- One mile – 4:30.62 (Gateshead 1994)
- 3000 meters – 9:05.47 (Ottawa 1989)

Indoor

- 1000 meters – 2:41.70 (North York 1993)
- 1500 meters – 4:11.80 (Hamilton 1994)
- One mile – 4:33.95 (New York 1993)
