= Carla Sacramento =

Portuguese middle-distance runner (born 1971)

Personal information
- Born: 10 December 1971 (age 54) São Sebastião da Pedreira, Portugal

Sport
- Sport: Track and field
Medal record
Representing Portugal
World Championships
Gold medal – first place	1997 Athens	1500 m
Bronze medal – third place	1995 Gothenburg	1500 m
European Championships
Silver medal – second place	1998 Budapest	1500 m
Summer Universiade
Silver medal – second place	1997 Catania	1500 m

Carla Cristina Paquete Sacramento OIH (born 10 December 1971) is a middle-distance runner from Portugal.

== Biography ==
Sacramento won medals at a variety of distances but her speciality is the 1500 m. She won the IAAF World Championships in Athletics in 1997 in Athens after having won a bronze medal in the 1995 championships.

Sacramento won her first national title in 1986 when she was only fifteen years old. She and Fernanda Ribeiro both excelled at a national level as young girls and have dominated Portuguese middle and long-distance running since. Sacramento has run under 2 minutes for 800 m and 4 minutes for 1500 m many times, both of which marks are thought of as benchmarks of world class running.

Sacramento competes for the Portuguese club Maratona Clube de Portugal but lives in Madrid. Her family is of Sao Tome origin. A track was named in her honour in Portugal.

Sacramento won the inaugural edition of the Oeiras International Cross Country race in 2000.

== Major achievements ==
Year	Competition	Venue	Position	Event	Notes
Representing Portugal
1988	World Junior Championships	Sudbury, Canada	11th (sf)	800 m	2:07.24
1989	European Junior Championships	Varaždin, Yugoslavia	4th	800 m	2:04.58
1989	European Junior Championships	Varaždin, Yugoslavia	9th (h)	4 × 400 m relay	3:43.68
1990	World Junior Championships	Plovdiv, Bulgaria	4th	800 m	2:04.83
1990	World Junior Championships	Plovdiv, Bulgaria	4th	1500 m	4:15.29
1990	Ibero-American Championships	Manaus, Brazil	4th	800m	2:04.85
1990	Ibero-American Championships	Manaus, Brazil	3rd	1500m	4:15.06
1992	European Indoor Championships	Genoa, Italy	4th	800 m	2:02.90
1992	European Indoor Championships	Genoa, Italy	–	1500 m	DNF
1992	Olympic Games	Barcelona, Spain	14th (sf)	800 m	2:02.85
1992	Olympic Games	Barcelona, Spain	16th (sf)	1500 m	4:05.54
1993	World Indoor Championships	Toronto, Canada	7th	1500 m	4:13.41
1993	World Championships	Gothenburg, Sweden	26th (h)	800 m	2:03.74
1993	World Championships	Gothenburg, Sweden	11th	1500 m	4:09.15
1994	European Indoor Championships	Paris, France	3rd	800 m	2:01.12
1994	European Championships	Helsinki, Finland	6th	800m	2:00.01
1994	European Championships	Helsinki, Finland	6th	1500m	4:20.62
1995	World Indoor Championships	Barcelona, Spain	2nd	1500 m	4:13.02
1995	World Championships	Gothenburg, Sweden	3rd	1500 m	4:03.79
1996	European Indoor Championships	Stockholm, Sweden	1st	1500 m	4:08.95
1996	Olympic Games	Atlanta, United States	6th	1500 m	4:03.91
1997	World Indoor Championships	Paris, France	5th	1500 m	4:06.33
1997	World Championships	Athens, Greece	1st	1500 m	4:04.24
1997	Summer Universiade	Catania, Italy	2nd	1500 m	4:10.40
1998	Ibero-American Championships	Lisbon, Portugal	1st	1500 m	4:17.43
1998	European Championships	Budapest, Hungary	2nd	1500 m	4:12.62
1999	World Championships	Seville, Spain	5th	1500 m	4:01.29
2000	Olympic Games	Sydney, Australia	10th	1500 m	4:11.15
2001	World Indoor Championships	Lisbon, Portugal	4th	1500 m	4:11.76
2001	World Championships	Edmonton, Canada	4th	1500 m	4:03.96
2001	Goodwill Games	Brisbane, Australia	3rd	Mile	4:39.18
2002	European Indoor Championships	Vienna, Austria	2nd	3000 m	8:53.96
2002	European Championships	Munich, Germany	12th	1500 m	4:17.01
2003	World Championships	Paris, France	21st (sf)	1500 m	4:13.14
2004	Olympic Games	Athens, Greece	22nd (sf)	1500 m	4:10.85

- In addition, she finished in the top ten at the World Cross Country Championships.

== Personal bests ==
- 400 m 54.07 (1997)
- 800 m 1:58.94 (1997)
- 1500 m 3:57.71 (1998)
- 3000 m 8:30.22 (1999)
- 5000 m 15:52.54 (2000)
- 10 km 33:46(1997)
