= Natalia Rodríguez (runner) =

Spanish middle-distance runner

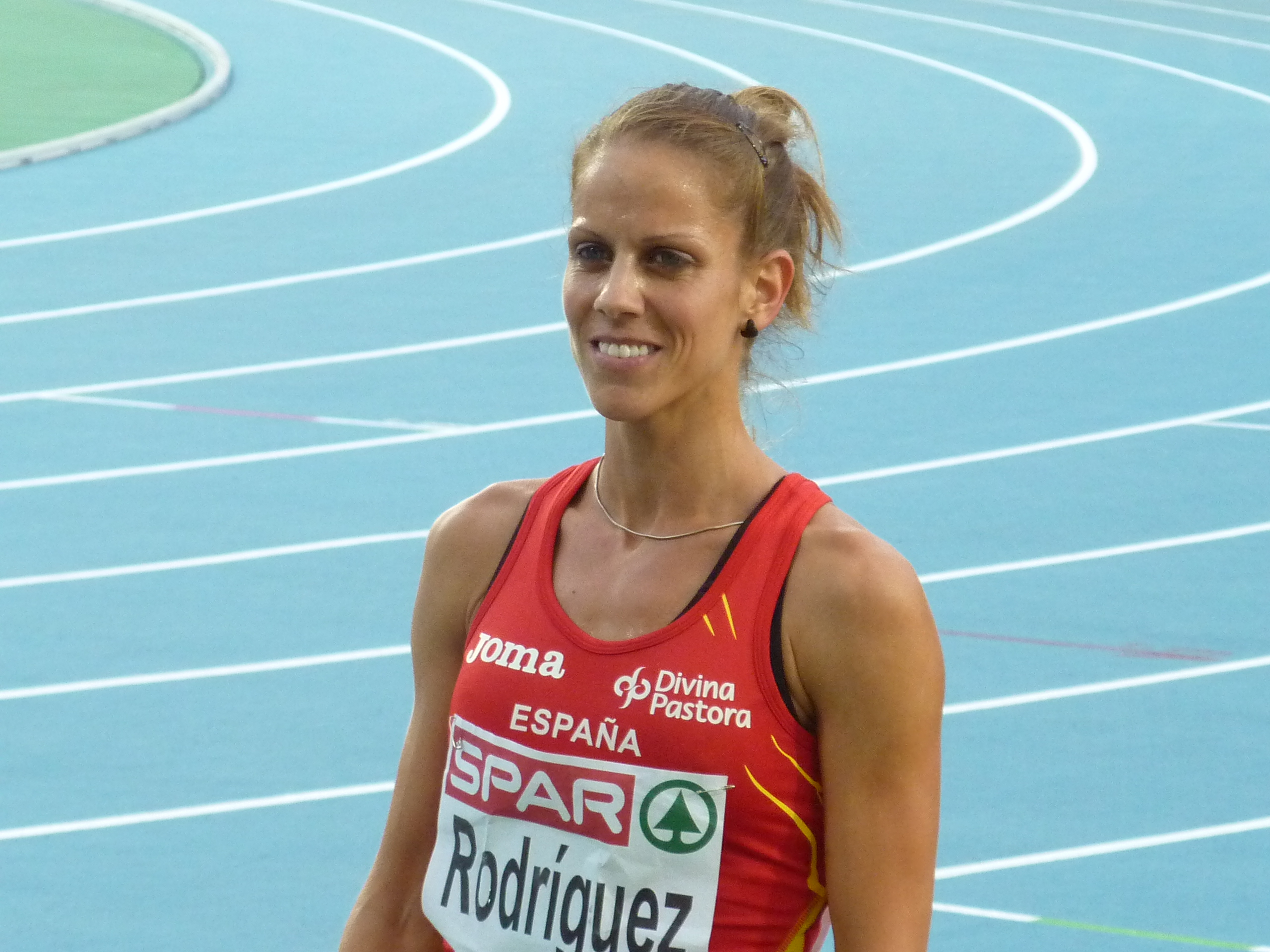
- Natalia Rodríguez in Barcelona 2010

Medal record

Women's athletics

Representing Spain

World Championships
Bronze medal – third place	2011 Daegu	1500 m

European Championships
Bronze medal – third place	2010 Barcelona	1500 m

World Indoor Championships
Silver medal – second place	2010 Doha	1500 m

European Indoor Championships
Gold medal – first place	2009 Torino	1500 m

Natalia Rodríguez Martínez (born 2 June 1979) is a Spanish middle-distance runner, who specializes in the 1500 metres. She was born in Tarragona, and represented Spain at the Summer Olympics in 2000, 2004, 2008 and 2012.

At the 2009 IAAF World Championships, Rodríguez initially finished first in the 1500 m, but was disqualified for tripping Gelete Burka. With 200 meters to go, Rodríguez thought she had a clear path to pass the Ethiopian runner on the inside, but when she attempted the pass, the pair collided and Burka crashed to the track.

Rodríguez won the silver medal at the 2010 IAAF World Indoor Championships, before going on to take the bronze medal outdoor at the 2010 European Athletics Championships.

She won the 2011 Cursa Bombers 10K race in Barcelona, although hot weather and a Catalan-only rule meant the race was uncompetitive.

== Achievements ==
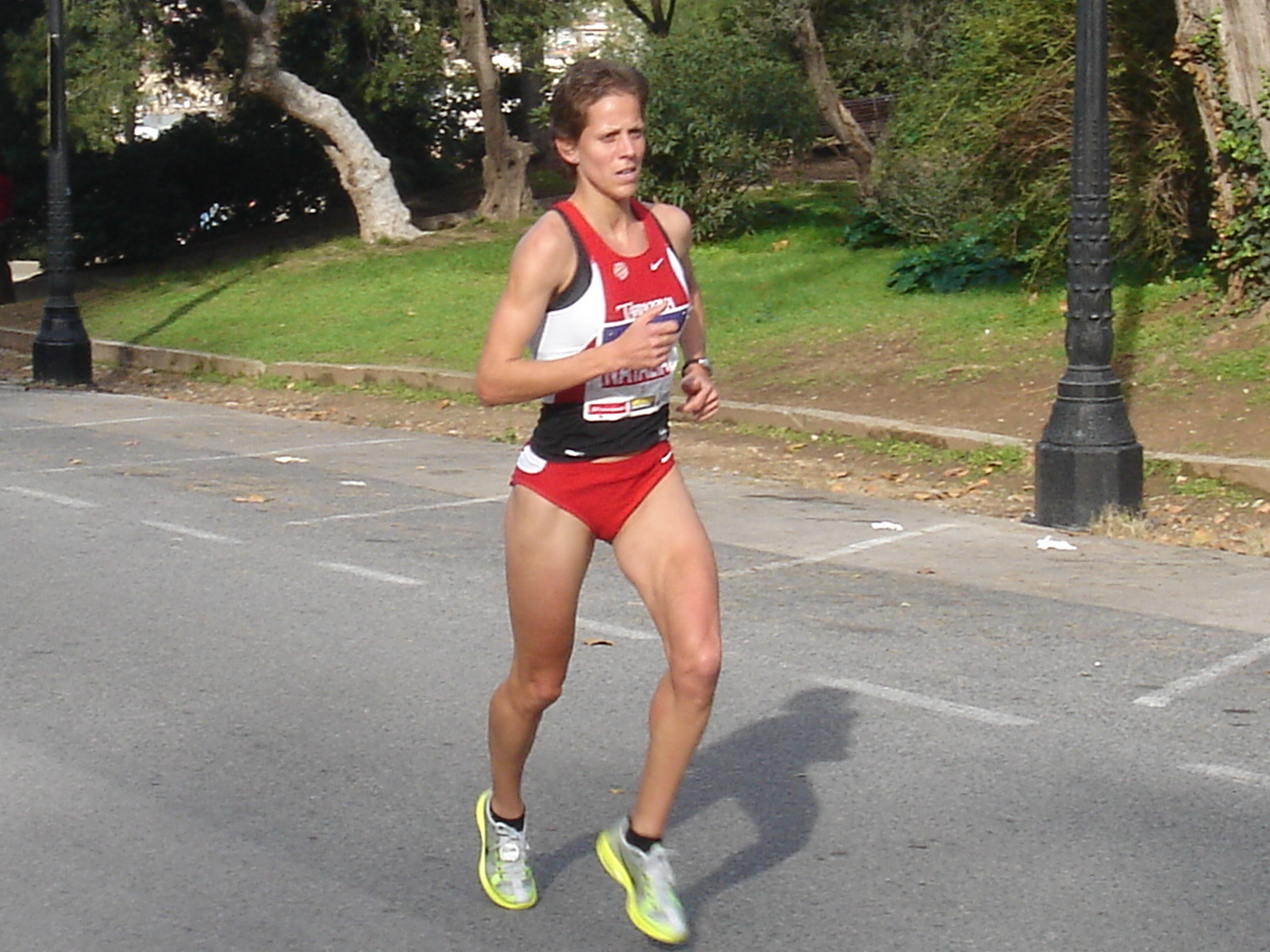
Rodríguez at the Jean Bouin road race in 2008

Year	Competition	Venue	Position	Event	Notes
Representing Spain
1996	World Junior Championships	Sydney, Australia	16th (h)	800m	2:09.09
1998	World Junior Championships	Annecy, France	6th	1500 m	4:16.20
1999	European U23 Championships	Gothenburg, Sweden	4th	1500m	4:10.65
2000	Olympic Games	Sydney, Australia	12th (heats)	1500 m	4:22.82
2001	European U23 Championships	Amsterdam, Netherlands	2nd	1500m	4:11.20
2001	World Championships	Edmonton, Canada	6th	1500 m	4:07.10
2002	European Championships	Munich, Germany	6th	1500 m	4:06.15
2003	World Championships	Paris, France	11th (semis)	1500 m	4:08.80
2004	World Indoor Championships	Budapest, Hungary	5th (heats)	1500 m	4:13.52
2004	Olympic Games	Athens, Greece	10th	1500 m	4:03.01
2004	World Athletics Final	Monte Carlo, Monaco	4th	1500 m	4:05.72
2005	World Championships	Helsinki, Finland	6th	1500 m	4:03.06
2005	World Athletics Final	Monte Carlo, Monaco	8th	1500 m	4:03.72
2008	Olympic Games	Beijing, People's Republic of China	6th	1500 m	4:03.19
2009	European Indoor Championships	Turin, Italy	1st	1500 m	4:08.72
2009	World Championships	Berlin, Germany	—	1500 m	DQ
2010	World Indoor Championships	Doha, Qatar	2nd	1500m	4:08.30
2010	European Championships	Barcelona, Spain	3rd	1500m	4:01.30
2011	World Championships	Daegu, South Korea	3rd	1500m	4:05.87
2012	Olympic Games	London, United Kingdom	13th (heats)	1500 m	4:16.18
2013	European Indoor Championships	Gothenburg, Sweden	—	1500 m	DNS (final)
2013	World Championships	Moscow, Russia	8th (heats)	1500 m	4:09.18

=== Personal bests ===
- 800 metres – 2:01.35 (2001)
- 1500 metres – 3:59.51 (2005)
- Mile – 4:21.92 (2008)
- 3000 metres – 8:35.86 (2009)
- 5000 metres – 16:15.21 (2011)
