= Olga Nelyubova =

Russian middle-distance runner

Medal record

Women's athletics

Representing the Soviet Union

European Indoor Championships
Silver medal – second place	1988 Budapest	800 m

Olga Nelyubova (Russian: Ольга Нелюбова; born 12 July 1964) is a Russian female former track and field athlete who competed in middle-distance running events. Her sole international medal came at the 1988 European Athletics Indoor Championships, where she was the 800 metres silver medallist behind West Germany's Sabine Zwiener.

She was a one-time national champion, winning the 1500 metres at the Russian Championships in 1998. She competed at three editions of the World Championships in Athletics, with her best performance being seventh in the final in 1997.

== International competitions ==
Year	Competition	Venue	Position	Event	Notes
1988	European Indoor Championships	Budapest, Hungary	2nd	800 m	2:01.61
1997	World Championships	Athens, Greece	7th	1500 m	4:07.34
1998	European Championships	Budapest, Hungary	15th (q)	1500 m	4:11.79
1999	World Championships	Seville, Spain	15th (q)	1500 m	4:06.01
2001	World Championships	Edmonton, Canada	— (semis)	1500 m	DNS

== National titles ==
- Russian Athletics Championships
  - 1500 m: 1998

== Personal bests ==
- 800 metres – 1:59.29 min (1997)
- 1000 metres – 2:39.23 min (1996)
- 1500 metres – 4:01.42 min (1998)
- Mile run – 4:29.28 min (2002)
- 3000 metres – 8:47.90 min (2002)

== See also ==
- List of European Athletics Indoor Championships medalists (women)
