= Andrea Šuldesová =

Andrea Šuldesová (born 11 February 1975 in Valtice) is a retired Czech athlete who specialised in the 1500 metres. She finished sixth at the 1997 World Championships in Athens.

== Competition record ==
Year	Competition	Venue	Position	Event	Notes
Representing Czechoslovakia
1992	World Junior Championships	Seoul, South Korea	13th (sf)	800 m	2:08.30
1992	World Junior Championships	Seoul, South Korea	9th (h)	4 × 400 m relay	3:42.02
Representing the Czech Republic
1994	World Junior Championships	Lisbon, Portugal	20th (h)	800 m	2:08.23
1995	World Indoor Championships	Barcelona, Spain	11th (sf)	800 m	2:07.25
1997	European U23 Championships	Turku, Finland	1st	1500 m	4:13.92
1997	European U23 Championships	Turku, Finland	3rd	4 × 400 m relay	3:33.83
1997	World Championships	Athens, Greece	6th	1500 m	4:06.33
1998	European Championships	Budapest, Hungary	7th	1500 m	4:15.04
1999	World Indoor Championships	Maebashi, Japan	6th	1500 m	4:06.37
1999	World Indoor Championships	Maebashi, Japan	–	3000 m	DNF
2001	World Indoor Championships	Lisbon, Portugal	13th (h)	1500 m	4:15.57

== Personal bests ==
Outdoor

- 800 metres – 2:01.22 (Malmö 1997)
- 1000 metres – 2:43.81 (Nove Mesto nad Metuji 2003)
- 1500 metres – 4:06.13 (Hengelo 1998)
- One mile – 4:33.65 (Sheffield 1998)
- 2000 metres – 5:44.98 (Ostrava 2003) NR
- 3000 metres – 8:52.05 (Rieti 1998)

Indoor

- 800 metres – 2:03.39 (Prague 2004)
- 1500 metres – 4:06.37 (Maebashi 1999)
- 2000 metres – 5:55.98 (Chemnitz 2001)
- 3000 metres – 8:49.15 (Erfurt 1999)
