= 2007 European Athletics Indoor Championships – Women's 3000 metres =

The Women's 3000 metres event at the 2007 European Athletics Indoor Championships was held on March 4.

== Medalists ==
Gold	Silver	Bronze
Lidia Chojecka; Poland	Marta Domínguez; Spain	Silvia Weissteiner; Italy

== Results ==
Rank	Name	Nationality	Time	Notes
1st place, gold medalist(s)	Lidia Chojecka	Poland	8:43.25	
2nd place, silver medalist(s)	Marta Domínguez	Spain	8:44.40	SB
3rd place, bronze medalist(s)	Silvia Weissteiner	Italy	8:44.81	NR
4	Sabrina Mockenhaupt	Germany	8:45.77	PB
5	Lisa Dobriskey	Great Britain	8:47.25	PB
6	Jo Pavey	Great Britain	8:54.94	
7	Mary Cullen	Ireland	9:00.42	
8	Dolores Checa	Spain	9:04.83	
9	Yuliya Vinokurova	Russia	9:07.03	
10	Dobrinka Shalamanova	Bulgaria	9:13.75	
11	Ancuta Bobocel	Romania	9:18.76	
12	Regina Rakhimkulova	Russia	9:26.81	
	Iris Fuentes-Pila	Spain	DNF	
