= 2002 European Athletics Indoor Championships – Women's 3000 metres =

The women's 3000 metres event at the 2002 European Athletics Indoor Championships was held on March 3.

== Results ==
Rank	Name	Nationality	Time	Notes
1st place, gold medalist(s)	Marta Domínguez	Spain	8:53.87	
2nd place, silver medalist(s)	Carla Sacramento	Portugal	8:53.96	
3rd place, bronze medalist(s)	Yelena Zadorozhnaya	Russia	8:58.36	
4	Susanne Pumper	Austria	8:59.93	
5	Liliya Volkova	Russia	9:02.48	
6	Maria Cristina Grosu-Mazilu	Romania	9:02.99	
7	María Luisa Larraga	Spain	9:03.45	
8	Sabrina Mockenhaupt	Germany	9:03.82	
9	Helena Javornik	Slovenia	9:04.83	
10	María Cristina Petite	Spain	9:05.25	
11	Maria Cioncan	Romania	9:08.07	
12	Krisztina Papp	Hungary	9:13.14	
13	Lívia Tóth	Hungary	9:14.58	
14	Oksana Belyakova	Russia	9:18.31	
15	Tatyana Kryvobok	Ukraine	9:23.86	
16	Inês Monteiro	Portugal	9:24.87	
17	Silvia Felipo	Andorra	10:16.31	
