= Yelena Zadorozhnaya =

Russian runner (born 1977)

Yelena Anatolyevna Zadorozhnaya
Personal information
- Nationality: Russian
- Born: 3 December 1977 (age 47) Ust-Kut, Russian SFSR, Soviet Union (now Russia)

Sport
- Sport: Athletics
- Event(s): 3000 metres 3000 metres steeplechase 5000 metres

Yelena Anatolyevna Zadorozhnaya (Russian: Елена Анатольевна Задорожная, born 3 December 1977 in Ustkut) is a Russian runner who specializes in the 3000 metres, 5000 metres and 3000 metres steeplechase.

== International competitions ==
Representing Russia
Year	Competition	Venue	Position	Event	Notes
1999	European U23 Championships	Gothenburg, Sweden	2nd	1500 m	4:09.03
1999	Military World Games	Zagreb, Croatia	2nd	1500 m	4:09.03
2001	World Indoor Championships	Lisbon, Portugal	3rd	3000 m	8:40.15
2001	World Championships	Edmonton, Canada	6th	5000 m	15:16.15
2002	European Indoor Championships	Vienna, Austria	3rd	3000 m	8:58.36
2002	European Championships	Munich, Germany	3rd	5000 m	15:15.22
2002	Grand Prix Final	Paris, France	1st	1500 m	4:00.63
2003	World Championships	Paris, France	8th	1500 m	4:02.46
2003	World Championships	Paris, France	4th	5000 m	14:52.36
2003	World Athletics Final	Monte Carlo, Monaco	9th	1500 m	4:03.71
2003	World Athletics Final	Monte Carlo, Monaco	2nd	3000 m	8:37.40
2004	World Indoor Championships	Budapest, Hungary	6th	3000 m	9:13.70
2004	Olympic Games	Athens, Greece	4th	5000 m	14:55.52
2004	World Athletics Final	Monte Carlo, Monaco	3rd	1500 m	4:05.71
2004	World Athletics Final	Monte Carlo, Monaco	2nd	3000 m	8:37.65
2005	World Championships	Helsinki, Finland	6th	3000 m s'chase	9:37.91
2005	World Athletics Final	Monte Carlo, Monaco	5th	3000 m s'chase	9:32.41 PB
2008	Olympic Games	Beijing, China	—	5000 m	DNF
2011	European Indoor Championships	Paris, France	7th	3000 m	9:06.44

== Personal bests ==
- 800 metres - 2:02.31 min (1999)
- 1500 metres - 3:59.94 min (2002)
- Mile run - 4:21.57 min (2004)
- 3000 metres - 8:25.40 min (2001)
- 5000 metres - 14:40.47 min (2001)
- 3000 metres steeplechase - 9:32.41 min (2005)
