= Jasminka Guber =

Bosnian middle-distance runner

Personal information
- Nationality: Bosnian
- Born: 10 August 1985 (age 40)

Sport
- Sport: Middle-distance running
- Event: 1500 metres

Jasminka Guber (born 10 August 1985) is a Bosnian middle-distance runner. She competed in the women's 1500 metres at the 2004 Summer Olympics.
