= Anna Jakubczak =

Polish middle-distance runner

Personal information
- Full name: Anna Jakubczak-Pawelec
- Born: 2 February 1973 (age 53) Zamość, Poland
- Height: 168 cm (5 ft 6 in)

Sport
- Country: Poland
- Sport: Middle-distance running

Anna Jakubczak-Pawelec (born 2 February 1973 in Zamość) is a Polish middle distance runner who specializes in the 1500 metres.

== Competition record ==
Year	Competition	Venue	Position	Event	Notes
Representing Poland
1992	World Cross Country Championships	Boston, United States	68th	Junior race	
1998	European Championships	Budapest, Hungary	4th	1500 m	4:13.33
1999	World Championships	Seville, Spain	7th	1500 m	4:04.40
2000	Olympic Games	Sydney, Australia	6th	1500 m	4:06.49
2003	World Indoor Championships	Birmingham, United Kingdom	24th (h)	1500 m	4:18.56
2004	Olympic Games	Athens, Greece	7th	1500 m	4:00.15
2005	World Championships	Helsinki, Finland	7th	1500 m	4:03.38
2006	European Championships	Gothenburg, Sweden	23rd (h)	1500 m	4:14.40
2008	Olympic Games	Sydney, Australia	12th (h)	1500 m	4:07.33

=== Personal bests ===
- 800 metres - 2:00.78 min (1999)
- 1500 metres - 4:00.15 min (2004)
- 3000 metres - 9:17.75 min (1998)
