= Frédérique Quentin =

French middle-distance runner

Personal information
- Nationality: French
- Born: 22 December 1969 (age 56) Sibiville, France
- Years active: 1990-1999

Sport
- Events: 800 m, 1500 m
- Club: ASPTT Lille
Medal record
Representing France
Mediterranean Games
Gold medal – first place	1993 Narbonne	1500m
Silver medal – second place	1991 Athens	800m

Frédérique Quentin (born 22 December 1969) is a retired French athlete who specialised in the middle-distance events. She represented her country at the 1996 Summer Olympics, as well as three World Championships, without qualifying to the final.

She is the national record holder in the mile run.

== Competition record ==
Year	Competition	Venue	Position	Event	Notes
Representing France
1991	Mediterranean Games	Athens, Greece	2nd	800 m	2:01.51
1993	Mediterranean Games	Narbonne, France	1st	1500 m	4:11.09
1994	European Indoor Championships	Paris, France	8th	1500 m	4:13.44
1994	European Championships	Helsinki, Finland	13th (h)	1500 m	4:11.91
1995	World Championships	Gothenburg, Sweden	16th (sf)	1500 m	4:11.66
1995	Universiade	Fukuoka, Japan	10th	1500 m	4:19.60
1996	European Indoor Championships	Stockholm, Sweden	7th	1500 m	4:13.92
1996	Olympic Games	Atlanta, United States	27th (h)	1500 m	4:15.95
1997	World Indoor Championships	Paris, France	13th (h)	1500 m	4:15.32
1997	World Championships	Athens, Greece	23rd (sf)	1500 m	4:16.15
1998	European Indoor Championships	Valencia, Spain	8th	1500 m	4:18.94
1998	European Championships	Budapest, Hungary	17th (h)	1500 m	4:17.00
1999	World Championships	Seville, Spain	24th (h)	1500 m	4:14.76

== Personal bests ==
Outdoor

- 800 metres – 2:02.28 (Frankfurt 1991)
- 1000 metres – 2:42.54 (Toulouse 1997)
- 1500 metres – 4:05.58 (Monaco 1999)
- One mile – 4:27.43 (1996)
- 2000 metres – 5:51.15 (Nancy 1999)

Indoor'

- 800 metres – 2:09.41 (Frankfurt 1996)
- 1000 metres – 2:42.62 (Liévin 1994)
- 1500 metres – 4:12.31 (Stuttgart 1997)

== French National Championships ==
- French Champion in 1,500 m in 1992, 1995, 1996, 1997 and 1998.
- French Champion Indoors in 1,500 m in 1994, 1995, 1996, 1997 and 1998
