= Sylvia Kühnemund =

German middle-distance runner

Personal information
- Born: 25 July 1974 (age 52) Sangerhausen, West Germany

Sport
- Sport: Track and field

Sylvia Thier (née Kühnemund; born 25 July 1974) is a retired German athlete who competed primarily in the 1500 metres events. She represented her country at the 1996 Summer Olympics and 1997 World Championships without qualifying for the final. Most of her successes came indoors where she made it to the final at the 1997 and 1999 World Indoor Championships, as well as at the 1996 and 1998 European Indoor Championships.

== Competition record ==
Year	Competition	Venue	Position	Event	Notes
Representing Germany
1996	European Indoor Championships	Stockholm, Sweden	6th	1500 m	4:13.34
1996	Olympic Games	Atlanta, United States	21st (sf)	1500 m	4:16.85
1997	World Indoor Championships	Paris, France	6th	1500 m	4:06.56
1997	World Championships	Athens, Greece	25th (h)	1500 m	4:11.21
1998	European Indoor Championships	Stockholm, Sweden	4th	1500 m	4:15.64
1999	World Indoor Championships	Maebashi, Japan	9th	1500 m	4:26.35

== Personal bests ==
Outdoor

- 1500 metres – 4:05.96 (Hengelo 1998)
- One mile – 4:33.28 (Lausanne 1997)
- 3000 metres steeplechase – 10:25.38 (Hamburg 2002)

Indoor

- 1500 metres – 4:06.56 (Paris 1997)
- 3000 metres – 9:12.50 (Karlsruhe 1999)
