= Gwen Griffiths =

South African runner

Personal information
- Born: Durban, South Africa
- Height: 1.74 m (5 ft 9 in)
- Weight: 50 kg (110 lb)

Sport
- Country: South Africa
- Sport: Athletics
- Events: 1500 m, 3000 m, 5000 m

Achievements and titles
- Personal bests: 1500 m: 4:04.73; 3000 m: 8:44.64; 5000 m: 15:08.05
Medal record
Women's athletics
Representing South Africa
African Championships
Gold medal – first place	1993 Durban	3000 m
Silver medal – second place	1992 Belle Vue Harel	1500 m
Silver medal – second place	1992 Belle Vue Harel	3000 m
Silver medal – second place	1993 Durban	1500 m

Gwendoline "Gwen" Griffiths is a South African runner who specialized in the 1500 and 5000 metres, later the marathon.

She was born in Durban with the surname van Rensburg, then was married Griffiths and later van Lingen

She took the bronze medals in 1500 and 3000 metres at the 1992 African Championships, and a 1500 silver and 3000 gold at the 1993 African Championships. She was selected as Africa's representative in 1500 metres at the 1992 World Cup, and finished fifth there. In 1993 she ran in the heats at the World Championships, both 1500 and 3000 metres. The next year she won a 1500 metres bronze medal at the 1994 Commonwealth Games. She also placed lowly at the 1993, 1995 and 1996 World Cross Country Championships. However, in the team competition, South Africa places as high as fourth in 1993; Griffiths was the fourth runner behind Zola Pieterse, Elana Meyer and Colleen de Reuck.

Griffiths reached a high point in global events as she finished eighth in the 5000 metres at the 1995 World Championships and ninth in the 1500 metres at the 1996 Olympic Games. She also competed at the 1997 World Indoor Championships without reaching the final. She became South African 1500 metres champion in 1993, 1995 and 1996. In 1998 she changed to the 10,000 metres and half marathon and became South African champion in both events (she formerly also won the 10,000 metres in 1990); she then won the marathon in 1999, 2000 and 2001.

In the middle distances, her personal best times were 4:04.73 minutes in the 1500 metres, achieved in August 1993 in Monaco; and 4:34.39 minutes in the mile run, achieved in July 1994 in Gateshead. In the long distances she had 8:44.64 minutes in the 3000 metres, achieved in June 1995 in Rome; and 15:08.05 minutes in the 5000 metres, achieved at the 1995 World Championships in Gothenburg. Her best marathon time was 2:36:25 hours from the 1999 South African Championships in Cape Town.
