= Margaret Crowley (runner) =

Australian middle-distance runner

Margaret Crowley (born 24 May 1967) is a retired Australian runner who specialized in the 1500 metres.

She finished fifth at the 1996 Olympic Games. She also competed at the 1997 World Championships and the 2000 Olympic Games without reaching the final.

Her personal best time was 4:01.34 minutes, achieved in July 1996 in Oslo. She also had 1:59.73 minutes in the 800 metres, achieved in July 1996 in Durham; and 4:25.84 minutes in the mile run, achieved in August 1996 in Monte Carlo.
