= Yekaterina Rozenberg =

Russian middle-distance runner

Yekaterina Rozenberg, née Noskova (Russian: Екатерина Розенберг, born 23 January 1980) is a retired Russian runner who specialized in the 1500 metres. She won the bronze medal at the 2003 IAAF World Indoor Championships, but has not competed since the 2003 season. Her personal bests were both set that season, with 1:59.98 min over 800 metres and 4:00.07 min over 1500 metres.

== Achievements ==
Year	Competition	Venue	Position	Event	Notes
Representing Russia
1999	European Junior Championships	Riga, Latvia	3rd	1.500 m	4:16.56
2003	World Indoor Championships	Birmingham, Great Britain	3rd	1.500 m	4:02.80
2003	World Championships	Paris, France	4th	1.500 m	4:00.59
2003	World Athletics Final	Monte Carlo, Monaco	8th	1.500 m	4:02.82
