= Sinéad Delahunty =

Irish middle-distance runner (born 1971)

Personal information
- Born: 12 February 1971 (age 55) County Kilkenny

Sport
- Country: Ireland
- Sport: Athletics
- Event(s): 1500, 3000, 5000 metres, One mile

Sinéad Delahunty-Evans (born 12 February 1971 in Kilkenny) is a retired Irish middle-distance runner who competed primarily in the 1500 metres.

Delahunty competed for the Providence Friars track and field team in the NCAA. She represented her country at the 1996 and 2000 Summer Olympics, as well as two World Championships. As of June 2023 she has resigned as the head coach of Cross Country/Track & Field at Brandeis University in Waltham, Massachusetts, United States.

== Competition record ==
Year	Competition	Venue	Position	Event	Notes
Representing Ireland
1990	World Junior Championships	Plovdiv, Bulgaria	18th (h)	1500 m	4:27.15
1994	European Championships	Helsinki, Finland	16th (h)	1500 m	4:12.20
1995	World Indoor Championships	Barcelona, Spain	9th	3000 m	9:04.16
1995	World Championships	Athens, Greece	39th (h)	5000 m	16:18.81
1996	Olympic Games	Atlanta, United States	14th (sf)	1500 m	4:12.52
1997	World Indoor Championships	Paris, France	15th	3000 m	9:19.93
1997	World Championships	Athens, Greece	14th (sf)	1500 m	4:07.46
1998	European Championships	Budapest, Hungary	9th	1500 m	4:15.38
2000	European Indoor Championships	Ghent, Belgium	4th	1500 m	4:15.87
2000	Olympic Games	Sydney, Australia	25th (h)	1500 m	4:11.75

== Personal bests ==
Outdoor

- 1500 metres – 4:04.22 (Brussels 1998)
- One mile – 4:27.38 (Nice 1997)
- 3000 metres – 8:58 (Cambridge 1995)
- 5000 metres – 15:33.34 (Belgium 1995)

Indoor

- 1500 metres – 4:11.06+ (New York 2000)
- One mile – 4:30.41 (New York 2000)
- 3000 metres – 8:58.58 (Atlanta 1995)
