= Seloua Ouaziz =

Moroccan middle-distance runner

Personal information
- Nationality: Moroccan
- Born: 27 July 1974 (age 52)

Sport
- Sport: Middle-distance running
- Event: 1500 metres

Seloua Ouaziz (born 27 July 1974) is a Moroccan middle-distance runner. She competed in the women's 1500 metres at the 2000 Summer Olympics.
