= Patricia Djaté-Taillard =

French middle-distance runner

Medal record

Women's athletics

World Indoor Championships
Silver medal – second place	1997 Paris	1500 m

European Indoor Championships
Gold medal – first place	1996 Stockholm	800 m

Patricia Djaté-Taillard (born 3 January 1971) is a retired French middle-distance runner who specialized in the 800 and 1500 metres.

She was born in Paris and represented the club SA Pamiers Basse Ariège. As a junior, she finished eighth in the relay at the 1988 World Junior Championships and eighth in 800 metres at the 1990 World Junior Championships. She also competed at the 1989 European Junior Championships.

As a senior, she finished seventh at the 1994 European Championships, fourth at the 1995 World Championships, and sixth at the 1996 Olympic Games, and won the gold medal at the 1996 European Indoor Championships. She also competed at the 1994 European Indoor Championships and the 1995 World Indoor Championships without reaching the final.

From 1997 she competed in the 1500 metres, winning a bronze medal at the 1997 World Indoor Championships, which was upgraded to silver when the IAAF retroactively disqualified second-place finisher Mary Slaney after an arbitration panel upheld her positive result in a 1996 testosterone test. She competed at the 1997 World Championships and the 1998 European Championships without reaching the final. She later finished sixth at the 2000 European Indoor Championships.

She became French 800 metres champion in 1994 and 1999. She became French indoor 800 metres champion in 1994, 1995, 1996, 1997 and 1999 and 1500 champion in 2000. Rivals were Viviane Dorsile, Laetitia Valdonado, Virginie Fouquet, Frédérique Quentin and Latifa Essarokh. Her personal best times were 1:56.53 minutes in the 800 metres, achieved in September 1995 in Monaco; 4:02.26 minutes in the 1500 metres, achieved in August 1996 in Brussels; and 4:27.58 minutes in the mile run, achieved in July 1997 in Nice.
