= Malin Ewerlöf-Krepp =

Swedish middle-distance runner

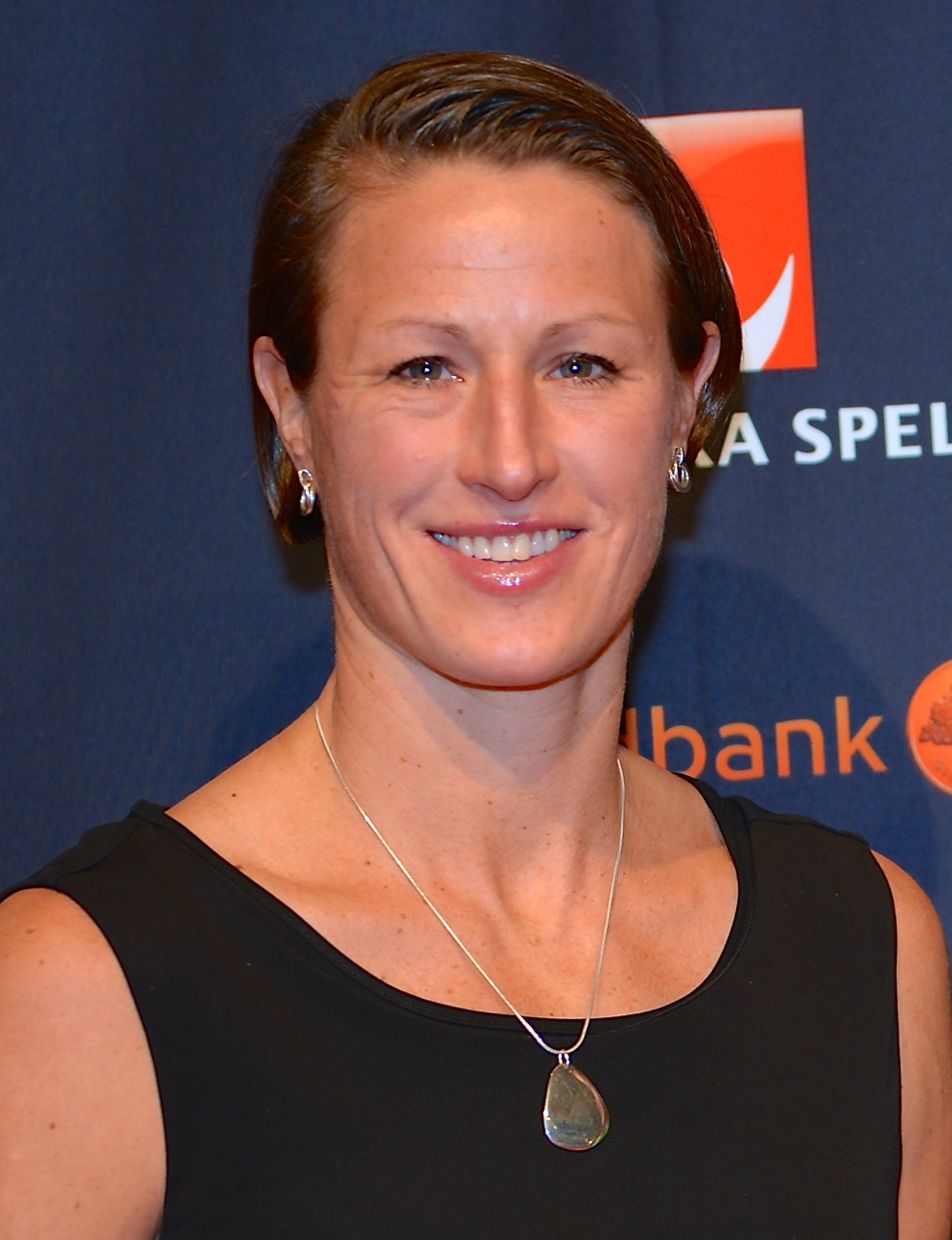

Medal record

Women's athletics

Representing Sweden

European Championships
Silver medal – second place	1998 Budapest	800 m

Malin Ewerlöf-Krepp (born 2 June 1972 in Gävle) is retired Swedish athlete who competed in the middle-distance events. She represented her country at the 1996 Summer Olympics in both 800 and 1500 metres, reaching semifinals in the latter. She won the 800 metres silver medal at the 1998 European Championships.

== Competition record ==
Year	Competition	Venue	Position	Event	Notes
Representing Sweden
1988	World Junior Championships	Sudbury, Canada	7th	3000 m	9:23.37
1989	European Indoor Championships	The Hague, Netherlands	8th	1500 m	4:11.70
1990	World Junior Championships	Plovdiv, Bulgaria	3rd	1500 m	4:14.61
1991	European Junior Championships	Thessaloniki, Greece	1st	1500 m	4:15.43
1994	European Championships	Helsinki, Finland	15th (sf)	800 m	2:02.28
1995	World Championships	Gothenburg, Sweden	23rd (h)	800 m	2:02.28
1996	Olympic Games	Atlanta, United States	22nd (h)	800 m	2:01.61
1996	Olympic Games	Atlanta, United States	18th (sf)	1500 m	4:13.85
1997	World Indoor Championships	Paris, France	5th (sf)	1500 m	4:09.72
1997	World Championships	Athens, Greece	10th	1500 m	4:08.68
1998	European Indoor Championships	Valencia, Spain	2nd	800 m	2:03.61
1998	European Championships	Budapest, Hungary	2nd	800 m	1:59.61
1999	World Indoor Championships	Maebashi, Japan	5th (sf)	800 m	2:01.93
1999	World Championships	Seville, Spain	18th (h)	1500 m	4:07.67

== Personal bests ==
Outdoor

- 800 metres – 1:59.44 (Budapest 1998)
- 1000 metres – 2:41.72 (Stockholm 1995)
- 1500 metres – 4:05.49 (Luzern 1997)
- One mile – 4:25.34 (Bellinzona 1997) NR
- 3000 metres – 9:23.37 (Sudbury 1988)
- Marathon – 2:44:38 (Stockholm 2005)

Indoor

- 800 metres – 2:01.31 (Stockholm 1997)
- 1000 metres – 2:38.11 (Stockholm 1999) NR
- 1500 metres – 4:09.72 (Paris 1997)
