= Carmen Wüstenhagen =

German middle-distance runner

Personal information
- Nationality: German
- Born: 15 August 1973 (age 52)

Sport
- Sport: Middle-distance running
- Event: 1500 metres

Carmen Wüstenhagen (born 15 August 1973) is a German middle-distance runner. She competed in the women's 1500 metres at the 1996 Summer Olympics.
