= Svetlana Masterkova =

Russian middle-distance runner (born 1968)

Personal information
- Full name: Svetlana Aleksandrovna Masterkova
- Nationality: Russian
- Born: 17 January 1968 (age 58) Achinsk, Russian SFSR, Soviet Union (now Russia)
- Height: 1.72 m (5 ft 7 1/2 in)
- Weight: 59 kg (130 lb)

Sport
- Country: Russia
- Sport: Women's athletics

Achievements and titles
- Personal bests: 800 m: 1:55.87 1000 m: 2:28.98 WR; 1500 m: 3:56.77 1 mile: 4:12.56 NR
Medal record
Women's athletics
Representing Russia
Olympic Games
Gold medal – first place	1996 Atlanta	800 m
Gold medal – first place	1996 Atlanta	1500 m
World Championships
Gold medal – first place	1999 Seville	1500 m
Bronze medal – third place	1999 Seville	800 m
European Championships
Gold medal – first place	1998 Budapest	1500 m

Svetlana Aleksandrovna Masterkova (Russian: Светлана Александровна Мастеркова; born 17 January 1968) is a Russian former middle-distance runner and former women's world record holder for the mile and the current 1000 metres world record. At the 1996 Summer Olympics, she won the gold medal in both the 800 metres and 1500 metres.

== Career ==
Born in Achinsk (Siberia), Masterkova started out as an 800 metres runner. She first appeared internationally at the 1985 European Athletics Junior Championships, taking 6th place in the 800 metres. Her breakthrough came in 1991, winning the national championships of the Soviet Union, which also qualified her for the World Championships. In Tokyo, she placed eighth in the final. During the following seasons, she had some minor successes (silver at the IAAF World Indoor Championships in 1993), but also suffered from injuries. In 1994 and 1995, she took a break from running, giving birth to a daughter (Anastasia).

In 1996, she returned to athletics. Instead of only running the 800 m, Masterkova also decided to compete in the 1500 metres, a distance she had not competed in four years. At the Russian Championships, she won both distances in top times. However, she was not considered as a real favourite for the 800 m Olympic gold; Maria Mutola and Ana Fidelia Quirot were expected to fight for the title in Atlanta. Masterkova took the lead from the start, and led the entire race to become Olympic champion. After this surprise, Masterkova caused a major upset by also winning the 1500 m in a similar fashion, thereby equaling Tatyana Kazankina's performance at the 1976 Olympics (Kelly Holmes would repeat the performance in 2004). She completed her season by also setting two new world records at the 1000 metre and mile distances.

Masterkova was not able to repeat her feat at the World Championships the next year, as an achilles tendon injury caused her to drop out in the heats of the 1500 metres. Her 1998 season was great again, crowned by a win in the 1500 m at the European Championships. At the 1999 World championships, Masterkova again contested both middle distance events. She won bronze in the 800 m won by Ludmila Formanová but comprehensively won the 1500 metres title. This would be her last major success. Although Masterkova participated in the Sydney Olympics, she abandoned her 1500 metres heat. She announced her retirement at Znamensky Indoor stadium on 7 January 2003.

== Personal life ==
Svetlana married Russian professional road racing cyclist Asiat Saitov in 1994. Their daughter Anastasiya Saitova is a professional tennis player, taking her first singles title in Sharm El Sheikh and ranked number 511 in the world in 2014.

== Records ==
Distance	Time	Date	Place
800 metres	1:55.87	18 June 1999	Moskva
1000 metres	2:28.98 WR	23 August 1996	Bruxelles
1500 metres	3:57.11	8 August 1988	Monaco
1 Mile	4:12.56 NR	14 August 1996	Zürich

== Honours and awards ==
- Order of Merit for the Fatherland, 3rd class (26 August 1996) - for services to the State and outstanding achievements in sport
- Honoured Master of Sports of Russia
- IAAF World Athlete of the Year (1996)
- European Sportsperson of the Year (1996)

== See also ==
- List of Olympic medalists in athletics (women)
- List of 1996 Summer Olympics medal winners
- List of World Athletics Championships medalists (women)
- List of IAAF World Indoor Championships medalists (women)
- List of European Athletics Championships medalists (women)
- List of European Athletics Indoor Championships medalists (women)
- List of Russian sportspeople
- 800 metres at the Olympics
- 1500 metres at the Olympics
- 800 metres at the World Championships in Athletics
- 1500 metres at the World Championships in Athletics

Records
Preceded by Paula Ivan	Women's Mile World Record Holder; August 14, 1996 – July 12, 2019	Succeeded by Sifan Hassan
Preceded by Maria Mutola	Women's 1000 m World Record Holder; August 23, 1996 – present	Succeeded by Incumbent
Awards and achievements
Preceded by Sonia O'Sullivan	Women's European Athlete of the Year; 1996	Succeeded by Astrid Kumbernuss
Preceded by Sonia O'Sullivan	Women's Track & Field Athlete of the Year; 1996	Succeeded by Marion Jones
