= Anita Weyermann =

Swiss runner (born 1977)

Personal information
- Nationality: Switzerland
- Born: 8 December 1977 (age 48) Wynigen, Switzerland
- Height: 1.65 m (5 ft 5 in)
- Weight: 50 kg (110 lb)

Sport
- Sport: Athletics
- Event(s): 1500 metres, 3000 metres, 5000 metres, Cross country running
Medal record
Women's athletics
Representing Switzerland
World Championships
Bronze medal – third place	1997 Athens	1500 m
European Championships
Bronze medal – third place	1998 Budapest	1500 m
European Cross Country Championships
Gold medal – first place	1999 Velenje	Individual
World Junior Championships
Gold medal – first place	1994 Lisbon	1500 m
Gold medal – first place	1996 Sydney	3000 m

Anita Weyermann (born 8 December 1977) is a Swiss former middle- and long-distance runner.

She won the 1998 Eurocross meeting. In the 1999 season she began with a win at the Belfast International Cross Country and went on to take the gold at the European Cross Country Championships.

Weyermann retired from professional sports on 5 March 2008. She works as a radio journalist for a Bernese local radio station, Radio BEO, and as a running trainer.

== Personal bests ==
- 800 metres: 2:02.73 min, 5 July 1998 in Frauenfeld
- 1500 metres: 3:58.20 min, 8 August 1998 in Monaco, Swiss record
- 3000 metres: 8:35.83 min, 7 July 1999 in Rome
- 5000 metres: 14:59.28 min, 5 June 1996 in Rome

Awards
Preceded by Natascha Badmann	Swiss Sportswoman of the Year; 1999	Succeeded by Brigitte McMahon
