= Suzy Favor Hamilton =

American middle-distance runner

Suzy Favor
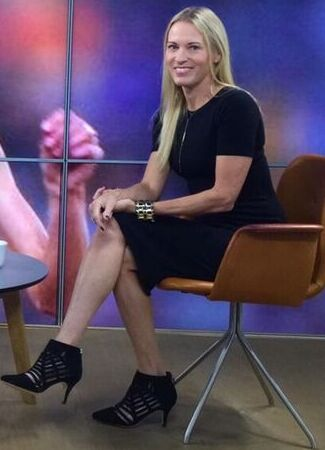
- Favor in 2016

Personal information
- Full name: Suzy Favor Hamilton
- Nationality: American
- Born: August 8, 1968 (age 58) Stevens Point, Wisconsin, U.S.
- Height: 5 ft 3 3/4 in (1.62 m)
- Weight: 110 lb (50 kg)
- Spouse: Mark Hamilton (m. 1991; div.2021)
- Children: 1

Sport
- Sport: Running
- Event: Middle-distance running
- College team: University of Wisconsin

Achievements and titles
- Personal bests: 800 m: 1:58.10 (2000); 1500 m: 3:57.40 (2000); Mile: 4:22.93 (1998); 5000 m: 15:06.48 (2000)
Medal record
Women's Athletics
Representing the United States
Universiade
Silver medal – second place	1989 Duisburg	1500 m
Pan American Junior Championships
Gold medal – first place	1984 Nassau	1500 m
Gold medal – first place	1986 Winter Park	1500 m

Suzy Favor Hamilton (born August 8, 1968) is an American former middle-distance runner and escort. She competed in the 1992, 1996, and 2000 Summer Olympics.

== Early life and education ==
Suzy Favor was born in 1968 to Conrad and Rachel (Skundberg) Favor in Stevens Point, Wisconsin. She graduated from the University of Wisconsin–Madison in 1991.

== Career ==
=== Running ===
Favor began running at age nine. She attended and competed at Stevens Point Area Senior High, graduating in 1986. She was the US Junior Record Holder at 1500m and won 3 National Junior Titles in High School. She was named by Scholastic Sports magazine as one of the top 100 High School Athletes of the Century and was inducted into the US National High School Sports Hall of Fame in 2010.

At the University of Wisconsin, she won the Honda Cup and Babe Zaharias Awards for Top Female Collegiate Athlete in the country. She was named by the Big Ten Conference as the top Female Athlete in Conference History. Coached by Peter Tegen, she became one of the top middle-distance runners in the US in the 1990s. She won a record nine NCAA championships, 32 Big-Ten championships and a silver medal in the 1989 World University Games. She won four USA Outdoor Track and Field Championships and three USA Indoor Track and Field Championships all in the 1500 meters.

In 1990, she won the Honda Sports Award as the nation's best female collegiate track and field athlete. In 1991, she won the Honda Sports Award in the top female cross country runner category. In addition, she was awarded the Honda-Broderick Cup, given to the nation's best overall female collegiate athlete.

In 1991 and 1992, Favor was a volunteer assistant cross country coach at Pepperdine University in Malibu, California.

Competing professionally, Favor competed in the Summer Olympics in 1992, 1996 and 2000, finishing 11th in her qualifying round race in the 1500 meters in 1992, and 4th in her qualifying race in the 800 meters in 1996. She made the finals of the 1500 meters in 2000 with the second best qualifying time (1/100 of a second slower than the best by the eventual winner). Though she led into the last lap of the final, she later revealed that she deliberately tripped on the track after fading in the stretch.

=== Prostitution ===
In December 2012, after being confronted by a reporter, Favor Hamilton admitted that she had worked as an escort. Favor has said that her decision to become an escort was made under the influence of her antidepressant medication, a misdiagnosis of her bipolar disorder, and with the full involvement of her now-ex-husband. She cited the effects of the suicide of her brother, Dan, in 1999, on her condition. She had learned from her therapist that the antidepressant she was taking had put her in a manic state, saying "It wasn't Suzy. I keep trying to emphasize that wasn't me. It was the disease." In the immediate aftermath of her escorting becoming public, the Big Ten renamed its award for Female Athlete of the Year which had previously carried her name. Favor Hamilton also lost several sponsorships and athletic business relationships, including with Nike. However, Favor subsequently was inducted into the inaugural class of the Collegiate Athletics Hall of Fame, along with athletes such as Carl Lewis, Jackie Joyner-Kersee, and Steve Prefontaine. She is now an artist and wrote her memoir Fast Girl about healing from bipolar disorder.

== Personal life ==
Favor married Mark Hamilton, then a pitcher on the university baseball team in 1991; they were divorced in 2021. Favor has one daughter. Favor lives in Hermosa Beach, California.

In November 2026, Favor Hamilton announced she had been diagnosed with stage-four neuroendocrine cancer.

== Publications ==
=== Books ===
- Fast Track: Training and Nutrition Secrets from America’s Top Female Runner, 2004. ISBN 9781594860133.
- Fast Girl: A Life Spent Running from Madness, 2016. ISBN 9780062346209.
