= Olga Komyagina =

Russian middle-distance runner

Olga Komyagina (born 10 February 1974) is a Russian middle-distance runner who specializes in the 1500 metres. She gained fame acting as a pacemaker/rabbit in races, and is widely considered to be the best pacemaker in the history of athletics.

== Achievements ==
Year	Competition	Venue	Position	Notes
1999	World Indoor Championships	Maebashi, Japan	4th	1500 m
2002	European Indoor Championships	Vienna, Austria	6th	1500 m
2006	World Cross Country Championships	Fukuoka, Japan	16th	Short race
2008	World Indoor Championships	Valencia, Spain	5th	3000 m

=== Personal bests ===
- 800 metres – 2:00.64 min (1999)
- 1500 metres – 4:02.32 min (2000)
- Mile run – 4:25.71 min (1999), indoor: 4:23.49 min (2008)
- 3000 metres – 8:42.58 min (1999), indoor: 8:35.67 min (2006)
