= Leah Pells =

Canadian middle-distance runner

Personal information
- Full name: Leah Marlee Pells
- Born: November 9, 1964 (age 61) Vancouver, British Columbia
- Height: 170 cm (5 ft 7 in)
- Weight: 55 kg (121 lb)
Medal record
Women's athletics
Representing Canada
Pan American Games
Silver medal – second place	1999 Winnipeg	1500 metres

Leah Marlee Pells (born November 9, 1964, in Vancouver, British Columbia) is a retired female track and field athlete from Canada who competed in the middle distance events and was once ranked first in the world in the 1500 metres. She represented Canada at three consecutive Summer Olympics from 1992 to 2000. Pells finished fourth in the 1500 metre race in Atlanta. Pells won the silver medal in the women's 1500 metres at the 1999 Pan American Games in Winnipeg.

Pells published her autobiography Not About the Medal in 2012. In the book, she writes about being the daughter of an alcoholic, experiencing abuse and growing up impoverished.

Pells has one son and now works as a trained counsellor.

== See also ==
- Canadian records in track and field
