= Theresia Kiesl =

Austrian middle-distance runner

Personal information
- Born: October 26, 1963 (age 62) Sarleinsbach, Austria

Sport
- Country: Austria
- Sport: Athletics
- Event: Middle-distance running

Olympic medal record

Women's Athletics
Bronze medal – third place	1996 Atlanta	1500 m

Theresia Kiesl (née Stöbich; born 26 October 1963 in Sarleinsbach) is a retired Austrian middle-distance runner who specialized in the 1500 metres. She was implicated in a 2006 doping scandal which also involved Stefan Matschiner, a friend of her husband; doping was confiscated in her home in 2007.

== Achievements ==
Year	Tournament	Venue	Result	Extra
1992	European Indoor Championships	Genoa, Italy	5th	1500 m
1993	World Championships	Stuttgart, Germany	6th	1500 m
1996	Olympic Games	Atlanta, United States	3rd	1500 m
1998	European Indoor Championships	Valencia, Spain	1st	1500 m

=== Personal bests ===
- 800 metres - 2:00.75 min (1993)
- 1500 metres - 4:03.02 min (1996) - Austrian record
- 3000 metres - 8:55.56 min (1993) - Austrian record

Awards
Preceded by (Austria) Ursula Profanter	Austrian Sportswoman of the year 1996	Succeeded by (Austria) Renate Götschl
