= Regina Jacobs =

American middle-distance runner

Medal record

Women's Athletics

Representing the United States

World Championships
Silver medal – second place	1997 Athens	1500 m
Silver medal – second place	1999 Seville	1500 m

Regina Jacobs (born August 28, 1963, in Los Angeles) is an American former middle-distance runner from Los Angeles. She had an extended career that included two IAAF World Championships in Athletics silver medals and an indoor world championship at the age of 39. Three months later, her career ended after winning what would have been a fifth straight National Championship in the 1500 meters when she was disqualified and banned for doping related to the BALCO scandal.

== Track & field career ==
Jacobs was an All-American runner for the Stanford Cardinal track and field team, finishing 4th in the 800 m at the 1982 NCAA Division I Outdoor Track and Field Championships and 6th in the 1500 m at the 1985 championships. After graduating from Stanford, Jacobs represented the US in three consecutive Summer Olympics starting in 1988 in Seoul, South Korea.

Jacobs took second place in the 1500 m race at the 6th World Championships in Athletics in Athens (4:04.63) in 1997, and again won the silver medal in the 1500 m at the World Championships in Sevilla in 1999 (4:00.35). In her years of running she won 25 national titles. On February 1, 2003, Jacobs set a world record in the indoor 1500 m with a time of 3:59.98, becoming the first woman to break 4 minutes in the event. Months later, she was officially banned for doping but her American record technically stood until March 2, 2025, when Heather MacLean ran 3:59.60 to set a new American record.

In her final years of competition, she was coached by her husband, Tom Craig.

In 2003, she retired after she tested positive for BALCO's 'designer' steroid THG and was suspended from competing in track & field for four years by the United States Anti-Doping Agency.

== Real estate career ==
Following her ban and subsequent retirement, Jacobs became a real estate agent in the Oakland, California, area. She earned an MBA from the University of California, Berkeley. She currently works for The Grubb Co. Realtors, with her husband on her team.
