= Maite Zúñiga =

Spanish middle-distance runner

María Teresa "Maite" Zúñiga Domínguez (born 28 December 1964 in Eibar) is a retired Basque Spanish middle-distance runner.

== International competitions ==
Year	Competition	Venue	Position	Event	Notes
Representing Spain
1983	Mediterranean Games	Casablanca, Morocco	8th	800 m	2:17.02
1983	Mediterranean Games	Casablanca, Morocco	5th	1500 m	4:27.56
1983	Ibero-American Championships	Barcelona, Spain	3rd	800 m	2:05.41
1983	Ibero-American Championships	Barcelona, Spain	2nd	4 × 400 m relay	3:41.30
1985	European Indoor Championships	Piraeus, Greece	9th (h)	800 m	2:06.21
1986	European Indoor Championships	Madrid, Spain	9th (h)	800 m	2:09.39
1986	Ibero-American Championships	Havana, Cuba	6th	800 m	2:06.83
1987	European Indoor Championships	Liévin, France	9th	1500 m	4:24.13
1988	European Indoor Championships	Budapest, Hungary	5th	1500 m	4:11.31
1988	Olympic Games	Barcelona, Spain	7th	800 m	1:59.82
1989	European Indoor Championships	The Hague, Netherlands	4th	800 m	2:02.77
1989	World Indoor Championships	Budapest, Hungary	9th (h)	800 m	2:03.65
1989	World Cup	Barcelona, Spain	5th	800 m	1:58.49
1989	World Cup	Barcelona, Spain	8th	4 × 400 m relay	3:36.50
1990	European Indoor Championships	Glasgow, United Kingdom	8th (sf)	800 m	2:05.26
1990	European Championships	Split, Yugoslavia	13th (sf)	800 m	2:01.81
1990	Ibero-American Championships	Manaus, Brazil	1st	800 m	2:02.22
1992	Olympic Games	Barcelona, Spain	6th	1500 m	4:00.59
1993	World Indoor Championships	Toronto, Canada	5th	1500 m	4:12.67
1994	European Indoor Championships	Paris, France	6th	1500 m	4:10.99
1994	European Championships	Helsinki, Finland	8th	1500 m	4:20.83
1995	World Indoor Championships	Barcelona, Spain	3rd	1500 m	4:16.63
1995	World Championships	Gothenburg, Sweden	8th	1500 m	4:07.27
1996	Olympic Games	Atlanta, United States	17th (sf)	1500 m	4:14.10
1997	World Championships	Athens, Greece	4th	1500 m	4:04.80
1997	Mediterranean Games	Bari, Italy	3rd	1500 m	4:11.63
