= Elena Antoci =

Romanian middle-distance runner

Personal information
- Born: 16 January 1975 (age 51) Braşov, Romania

Sport
- Sport: Track and field
Medal record
Representing Romania
Summer Universiade
Gold medal – first place	1999 Palma de Mallorca	1500m
Silver medal – second place	1999 Palma de Mallorca	800m
European Indoor Championships
Gold medal – first place	2005 Madrid	1500m
Silver medal – second place	2002 Vienna	1500m

Elena Antoci (née Buhăianu, divorced Iagăr; born 16 January 1975) is a Romanian middle distance runner who specializes in the 1500 metres.

She was European champion at European Indoor Championships in the 1500m event (2005) and European vicechampion at European Indoor Championships in the 1500m event (2002).

== Achievements ==
Year	Competition	Venue	Position	Notes
Representing Romania
1999	World Championships	Seville, Spain	6th	3000 m
2001	Universiade	Beijing, China	8th	1500 m
2001	Jeux de la Francophonie	Ottawa-Hull, Canada	1st	1500 m
2002	European Indoor Championships	Vienna, Austria	2nd	1500 m
2003	World Indoor Championships	Birmingham, England	6th	1500 m
2005	European Indoor Championships	Madrid, Spain	1st	1500 m

=== Personal bests ===
- 800 metres - 1:59.43 min (2004)
- 1500 metres - 4:02.90 min (2002)
