= 2016 in the sport of athletics =

2016 in athletics
- Major world events: 2016 Olympic Games

In 2016, the foremost athletics events will be staged at the Olympic Games in Rio de Janeiro. The two other major global level competitions in 2016 are the World Indoor Championships and World Half Marathon Championships.

A new addition to the continental tournament schedule came in the form of the 2016 European Athletics Youth Championships. Two long-running competitions were renamed and held under new titles in 2016. The World Junior Championships in Athletics became the 2016 IAAF World U20 Championships and the IAAF World Race Walking Cup was held as the 2016 IAAF World Race Walking Team Championships.

The hosting of the two above events had to be reopened as they were affected by the suspension of the All-Russia Athletic Federation as a result of contraventions of the World Anti-Doping Code. As a major nation in athletics, Russia's ban meant the absence of many world class athletes from competition. Kenya – another prominent country – was subject to a World Anti-Doping Agency plan to improve its own anti-doping infrastructure, on pain of exclusion from international events.

== Major championships ==
=== World ===
- Olympic Games
- Paralympic Games
- World Indoor Championships
- World Race Walking Team Championships
- World Half Marathon Championships
- World U20 Championships
- World Mountain Running Championships
- WMA World Masters Indoor Championships
- FISU Cross Country Championships
- IAU 24 Hour World Championships
- IAU 100 km World Championships

=== Regional ===
- African Championships
- African Cross Country Championships
- Arab Cross Country Championships
- Arab Junior Championships
- Asian Indoor Championships
- Asian Junior Championships
- Asian Cross Country Championships
- Asian Race Walking Championships
- South Asian Games
- European Athletics Championships
- European Athletics U18 Championships
- European Cross Country Championships
- European Throwing Cup
- European Mountain Running Championships
- Mediterranean U23 Championships in Athletics
- Ibero-American Championships
- NACAC Under-23 Championships
- CARIFTA Games
- South American U23 Championships
- South American Youth Championships
- South American Cross Country Championships
- Pan American Combined Events Cup
- Pan American Cross Country Cup

== Seasonal events ==
- Diamond League
- IAAF Hammer Throw Challenge
- IAAF Combined Events Challenge
- IAAF Race Walking Challenge
- World Marathon Majors
  - Tokyo
  - Boston
  - London
  - Berlin
  - Chicago
  - New York City
- IAAF Label Road Races

== World records ==
=== Indoor ===
Event	Athlete	Nation	Result	Location	Date
Men's 500 metres	Abdelalelah Haroun	Qatar	59.83	Stockholm, Sweden	17 February
Men's 1000 metres	Ayanleh Souleiman	Djibouti	2:14.20	Stockholm, Sweden	17 February
Women's mile run	Genzebe Dibaba	Ethiopia	4:13.31	Stockholm, Sweden	17 February
Women's pole vault	Jennifer Suhr	United States	5.03 m	Brockport, United States	23 February

=== Outdoor ===
Event	Athlete	Nation	Result	Location	Date
Men's 400 metres	Wayde van Niekerk	South Africa	43.03	Rio de Janeiro, Brazil	14 August
Women's 10,000 metres	Almaz Ayana	Ethiopia	29:17.45	Rio de Janeiro, Brazil	12 August
Women's 100 m hurdles	Kendra Harrison	United States	12.20	London, United Kingdom	22 July
Women's 3000 m steeplechase	Ruth Jebet	Bahrain	8:52.78	Paris, France	27 August
Women's hammer throw	Anita Włodarczyk	Poland	82.98 m	Warsaw, Poland	28 August

== Awards ==
=== Men ===
Award	Winner
IAAF World Athlete of the Year	Usain Bolt (JAM)
Track & Field News Athlete of the Year	Wayde van Niekerk (RSA)
European Athlete of the Year	Mo Farah (GBR)
European Athletics Rising Star	Max Heß (GER)
The Bowerman	Jarrion Lawson (USA)

=== Women ===
Award	Winner
IAAF World Athlete of the Year	Almaz Ayana (ETH)
Track & Field Athlete of the Year	Anita Włodarczyk (POL)
European Athlete of the Year	Ruth Beitia (ESP)
European Athletics Rising Star	Nafissatou Thiam (BEL)
The Bowerman	Courtney Okolo (USA)

== Doping ==
Among the first doping suspensions of the year was Kazakhstan hurdler Anastasiya Soprunova, who had won the Asian indoor title. Retests of samples taken at the 2008 Summer Olympics and 2012 Summer Olympics using new methods revealed several high-profile track athletes had given positive results, including major medallists for Russia.

== Results ==
=== 2016 Summer Olympics (IAAF) ===
- May 14 – 16: 2016 Ibero-American Championships in Athletics (Aquece Rio Athletics 2016) in Rio de Janeiro (Olympic Test Event)
  - Brazil won both the gold and overall medal tallies.
- August 12–21: 2016 Summer Olympics in (Brazil) Rio de Janeiro at the Estádio Olímpico João Havelange
  - Men
  - Men's 100m: (gold) (Jamaica) Usain Bolt; (silver) (United States) Justin Gatlin; (bronze) (Canada) Andre De Grasse
  - Men's 200m: (gold) (Jamaica) Usain Bolt; (silver) (Canada) Andre De Grasse; (bronze) (France) Christophe Lemaitre
  - Men's 400m: (gold) (South Africa) Wayde van Niekerk (WR); (silver) (Grenada) Kirani James; (bronze) (United States) LaShawn Merritt
  - Men's 800m: (gold) (Kenya) David Rudisha; (silver) (Algeria) Taoufik Makhloufi; (bronze) (United States) Clayton Murphy
  - Men's 1,500m: (gold) (United States) Matthew Centrowitz Jr.; (silver) (Algeria) Taoufik Makhloufi; (bronze) (New Zealand) Nick Willis
  - Men's 5,000m: (gold) (United Kingdom) Mo Farah; (silver) (United States) Paul Kipkemoi Chelimo; (bronze) (Ethiopia) Hagos Gebrhiwet
  - Men's 10,000m: (gold) (United Kingdom) Mo Farah; (silver) (Kenya) Paul Tanui; (bronze) (Ethiopia) Tamirat Tola
  - Men's 110m Hurdles: (gold) (Jamaica) Omar McLeod; (silver) (Spain) Orlando Ortega; (bronze) (France) Dimitri Bascou
  - Men's 400m Hurdles: (gold) (United States) Kerron Clement; (silver) (Kenya) Boniface Mucheru Tumuti; (bronze) (Turkey) Yasmani Copello
  - Men's 3,000m Steeplechase: (gold) (Kenya) Conseslus Kipruto (OR); (silver) (United States) Evan Jager; (bronze) (France) Mahiedine Mekhissi-Benabbad
  - Men's 20 km Walk: (gold) (China) Wang Zhen; (silver) (China) Cai Zelin; (bronze) (Australia) Dane Bird-Smith
  - Men's 50 km Walk: (gold) (Slovakia) Matej Tóth; (silver) (Australia) Jared Tallent; (bronze) (Japan) Hirooki Arai
  - Men's High Jump: (gold) (Canada) Derek Drouin; (silver) (Qatar) Mutaz Essa Barshim; (bronze) (Ukraine) Bohdan Bondarenko
  - Men's Pole Vault: (gold) (Brazil) Thiago Braz da Silva (OR); (silver) (France) Renaud Lavillenie; (bronze) (United States) Sam Kendricks
  - Men's Long Jump: (gold) (United States) Jeff Henderson; (silver) (South Africa) Luvo Manyonga; (bronze) (United Kingdom) Greg Rutherford
  - Men's Triple Jump: (gold) (United States) Christian Taylor; (silver) (United States) Will Claye; (bronze) (China) Dong Bin
  - Men's Shot Put: (gold) (United States) Ryan Crouser (OR); (silver) (United States) Joe Kovacs; (bronze) (New Zealand) Tomas Walsh
  - Men's Discus Throw: (gold) (Germany) Christoph Harting; (silver) (Poland) Piotr Małachowski; (bronze) (Germany) Daniel Jasinski
  - Men's Hammer Throw: (gold) (Tajikistan) Dilshod Nazarov; (silver) (Belarus) Ivan Tsikhan; (bronze) (Poland) Wojciech Nowicki
  - Men's Javelin Throw: (gold) (Germany) Thomas Röhler; (silver) (Kenya) Julius Yego; (bronze) (Trinidad and Tobago) Keshorn Walcott
  - Men's Decathlon: (gold) (United States) Ashton Eaton (OR); (silver) (France) Kévin Mayer; (bronze) (Canada) Damian Warner
  - Men's 4 × 100 metres Relay: (gold) Jamaica; (silver) Japan; (bronze) Canada
  - Men's 4 × 400 metres Relay: (gold) United States; (silver) Jamaica; (bronze) Bahamas
  - Men's Marathon: (gold) (Kenya) Eliud Kipchoge; (silver) (Ethiopia) Feyisa Lilesa; (bronze) (United States) Galen Rupp
  - Women
  - Women's 100m: (gold) (Jamaica) Elaine Thompson; (silver) (United States) Tori Bowie; (bronze) (Jamaica) Shelly-Ann Fraser-Pryce
  - Women's 200m: (gold) (Jamaica) Elaine Thompson; (silver) (Netherlands) Dafne Schippers; (bronze) (United States) Tori Bowie
  - Women's 400m: (gold) (The Bahamas) Shaunae Miller; (silver) (United States) Allyson Felix; (bronze) (Jamaica) Shericka Jackson
  - Women's 800m: (gold) (South Africa) Caster Semenya; (silver) (Burundi) Francine Niyonsaba; (bronze) (Kenya) Margaret Wambui
  - Women's 1,500m: (gold) (Kenya) Faith Kipyegon; (silver) (Ethiopia) Genzebe Dibaba; (bronze) (United States) Jennifer Simpson
  - Women's 5,000m: (gold) (Kenya) Vivian Cheruiyot (OR); (silver) (Kenya) Hellen Onsando Obiri; (bronze) (Ethiopia) Almaz Ayana
  - Women's 10,000m: (gold) (Ethiopia) Almaz Ayana (WR); (silver) (Kenya) Vivian Cheruiyot; (bronze) (Ethiopia) Tirunesh Dibaba
  - Women's 100m Hurdles: (gold) (United States) Brianna Rollins; (silver) (United States) Nia Ali; (bronze) (United States) Kristi Castlin
  - Women's 400m Hurdles: (gold) (United States) Dalilah Muhammad; (silver) (Denmark) Sara Petersen; (bronze) (United States) Ashley Spencer
  - Women's 3,000m Steeplechase: (gold) (Bahrain) Ruth Jebet; (silver) (Kenya) Hyvin Jepkemoi; (bronze) (United States) Emma Coburn
  - Women's 20 km Walk: (gold) (China) Liu Hong; (silver) (Mexico) María Guadalupe González; (bronze) (China) Lü Xiuzhi
  - Women's High Jump: (gold) (Spain) Ruth Beitia; (silver) (Bulgaria) Mirela Demireva; (bronze) (Croatia) Blanka Vlašić
  - Women's Pole Vault: (gold) (Greece) Ekaterini Stefanidi; (silver) (United States) Sandi Morris; (bronze) (New Zealand) Eliza McCartney
  - Women's Long Jump: (gold) (United States) Tianna Bartoletta; (silver) (United States) Brittney Reese; (bronze) (Serbia) Ivana Španović
  - Women's Triple Jump: (gold) (Colombia) Caterine Ibargüen; (silver) (Venezuela) Yulimar Rojas; (bronze) (Kazakhstan) Olga Rypakova
  - Women's Shot Put: (gold) (United States) Michelle Carter; (silver) (New Zealand) Valerie Adams; (bronze) (Hungary) Anita Márton
  - Women's Discus Throw: (gold) (Croatia) Sandra Perković; (silver) (France) Mélina Robert-Michon; (bronze) (Cuba) Denia Caballero
  - Women's Hammer Throw: (gold) (Poland) Anita Włodarczyk (WR); (silver) (China) Zhang Wenxiu; (bronze) (United Kingdom) Sophie Hitchon
  - Women's Javelin Throw: (gold) (Croatia) Sara Kolak; (silver) (South Africa) Sunette Viljoen; (bronze) (Czech Republic) Barbora Špotáková
  - Women's Heptathlon: (gold) (Belgium) Nafissatou Thiam; (silver) (United Kingdom) Jessica Ennis-Hill; (bronze) (Canada) Brianne Theisen-Eaton
  - Women's 4 × 100 metres Relay: (gold) United States; (silver) Jamaica; (bronze) Great Britain
  - Women's 4 × 400 metres Relay: (gold) United States; (silver) Jamaica; (bronze) Great Britain;
  - Women's Marathon: (gold) (Kenya) Jemima Sumgong; (silver) (Bahrain) Eunice Kirwa; (bronze) (Ethiopia) Mare Dibaba

=== World athletics championships ===
- March 11–13: 2016 World University Cross Country Championships in (Italy) Cassino
  - Men's 10.7 km winner: (Morocco) Hicham Amghar
  - Women's 6.2 km winner: (Turkey) Sevilay Eytemis
- March 17–20: 2016 IAAF World Indoor Championships in Portland, Oregon
  - The United States won both the gold and overall medal tallies.
- March 26: 2016 IAAF World Half Marathon Championships in (United Kingdom) Cardiff
  - Men's winner: (Kenya) Geoffrey Kipsang Kamworor
  - Women's winner: (Kenya) Peres Jepchirchir
  - Men's team winners: Kenya
  - Women's team winners: Kenya
- May 7 & 8: 2016 IAAF World Race Walking Team Championships in (Italy) Rome
  - Note: This event was taken away from Cheboksary, due to WADA and the IAAF report and votes against ARAF.
  - China won both the gold and overall medal tallies.
- July 19–24: 2016 IAAF World U20 Championships in (Poland) Bydgoszcz
  - Note: This event was taken away from Kazan, due to WADA and the IAAF report and votes against ARAF.
  - The United States won both the gold and overall medal tallies.

=== 2016 World Marathon Majors ===
- February 28: 2016 Tokyo Marathon
  - Winners: (Ethiopia) Feyisa Lilesa (m) / (Kenya) Helah Kiprop (f)
- April 18: 2016 Boston Marathon
  - Winners: (Ethiopia) Lemi Berhanu Hayle (m) / (Ethiopia) Atsede Baysa (f)
- April 24: 2016 London Marathon
  - Winners: (Kenya) Eliud Kipchoge (m) / (Kenya) Jemima Sumgong (f)
- September 25: 2016 Berlin Marathon
  - Winners: (Ethiopia) Kenenisa Bekele (m) / (Ethiopia) Aberu Kebede (f)
- October 9: 2016 Chicago Marathon
  - Winners: (Kenya) Abel Kirui (m) / (Kenya) Florence Kiplagat (f)
- November 6: 2016 New York City Marathon (final)
  - Winners: (Eritrea) Ghirmay Ghebreslassie (m) / (Kenya) Mary Jepkosgei Keitany (f)

=== 2016 IAAF Road Race Label Events (Gold) ===
- January 2: (China) Xiamen International Marathon
  - Winners: (Kenya) Vincent Kipruto (m) / (Ethiopia) Worknesh Edesa (f)
- January 17: Hong Kong Marathon
  - Winners: (Kenya) Mike Kiprotich Mutai (m) / (Ethiopia) Letebrhan Haylay Gebreslasea (f)
- January 22: (United Arab Emirates) Dubai Marathon
  - Winners: (Ethiopia) Tesfaye Abera (m) / (Ethiopia) Tirfi Tsegaye (f)
- February 28: (Puerto Rico) World's Best 10K
  - Winners: (Kenya) Bedan Karoki (m) / (Kenya) Mary Wacera Ngugi (f)
- March 6: (Japan) Lake Biwa Marathon (men only)
  - Winner: (Kenya) Lucas Rotich
- March 13: (Italy) Roma-Ostia Half Marathon
  - Winners: (Kenya) Solomon Kirwa Yego (m) / (Ethiopia) Workenesh Degefa (f)
- March 13: (Japan) Nagoya Women's Marathon (women only)
  - Winner: (Bahrain) Eunice Kirwa
- March 20: (South Korea) Seoul International Marathon
  - Winners: (Kenya) Wilson Loyanae (m) / (Kenya) Rose Chelimo (f)
- March 20: (Portugal) Lisbon Half Marathon
  - Winners: (Kenya) Sammy Kitwara (m) / (Ethiopia) Ruti Aga (f)
- April 2: (Czech Republic) Prague Half Marathon
  - Winners: (Kenya) Daniel Wanjiru (m) / (Kenya) Violah Jepchumba (f)
- April 3: (France) Paris Marathon
  - Winners: (Kenya) Cyprian Kimurgor Kotut (m) / (Kenya) Visiline Jepkesho (f)
- April 10: (Italy) Rome Marathon
  - Winners: (Kenya) Amos Kipruto (m) / (Ethiopia) Rahma Tusa (f)
- April 10: (Austria) Vienna City Marathon
  - Winners: (Kenya) Robert Chemosin (m) / (Ethiopia) Shuko Genemo (f)
- April 10: (Netherlands) Rotterdam Marathon
  - Winners: (Kenya) Marius Kipserem (m) / (Ethiopia) Letebrhan Haylay Gebreslasea (f)
- April 24: (China) Yangzhou Jianzhen International Half Marathon
  - Winners: (Ethiopia) Mosinet Geremew (m) / (Kenya) Peres Jepchirchir (f)
- May 8: (Czech Republic) Prague Marathon
  - Winners: (Kenya) Lawrence Cherono (m) / (Kenya) Lucy Karimi (f)
- May 21: (Czech Republic) Karlovy Vary Half Marathon
  - Winners: (Kenya) Abraham Akopesha (m) / (Kenya) Joyceline Jepkosgei (f)
- May 22: (United Kingdom) Great Manchester Run
  - Winners: (Ethiopia) Kenenisa Bekele (m) / (Ethiopia) Tirunesh Dibaba (f)
- May 28 & 29: (Canada) Ottawa Race Weekend
  - Men's 10K winner: (Morocco) Mohammed Ziani
  - Women's 10K winner: (Kenya) Peres Jepchirchir
  - Men's Marathon winner: (Ethiopia) Dino Sefir
  - Women's Marathon winner: (Ethiopia) Koren Jelela
- June 4: (Czech Republic) České Budějovice Half Marathon
  - Winners: (Kenya) Barselius Kipyego (m) / (Ethiopia) Ashete Bekere (f)
- June 25: (Czech Republic) Olomouc Half Marathon
  - Winners: (Kenya) Stanley Biwott (m) / (Kenya) Mary Jepkosgei Keitany (f)
- July 3: (Australia) Gold Coast Marathon
  - Winners: (Kenya) Kenneth Mburu Mungara (m) / (Japan) Misato Horie (f)
- July 31: (Colombia) Bogotá Half Marathon
  - Winners: (Ethiopia) Tadese Tola (m) / (Kenya) Purity Rionoripo (f)
- September 10: (Czech Republic) Prague Grand Prix
  - Winners: (Kenya) Abraham Kipyatich (m) / (Kenya) Violah Jepchumba (f)
- September 17: (Czech Republic) Ústí nad Labem Half Marathon
  - Winners: (Kenya) Barselius Kipyego (m) / (Kenya) Peres Jepchirchir (f)
- September 17: (China) Beijing Marathon
  - Winners: (Ethiopia) Mekuant Ayenew (m) / (Ethiopia) Meseret Mengistu (f)
- September 18: (Australia) Sydney Marathon
  - Winners: (Japan) Tomohiro Tanigawa (m) / (Ethiopia) Makda Harun (f)
- October 2: (Portugal) Lisbon Marathon
  - Winners: (Kenya) Alfred Kering (m) / (Kenya) Sarah Chepchirchir (f)
- October 2: Portugal Half Marathon
  - Winners: (Eritrea) Nguse Tesfaldet (m) / (Ethiopia) Genet Yalew (f)
- October 16: (Netherlands) Amsterdam Marathon
  - Winners: (Kenya) Daniel Wanjiru (m) / (Ethiopia) Meselech Melkamu (f)
- October 16: (Canada) Toronto Waterfront Marathon
  - Winners: (Kenya) Philemon Rono (m) / (Ethiopia) Shure Demise (f)
- October 23: (Spain) Valencia Half Marathon
  - Winners: (Kenya) Stephen Kosgei Kibet (m) / (Kenya) Peres Jepchirchir (f)
- October 30: (Germany) Frankfurt Marathon
  - Winners: (Kenya) Mark Korir (m) / (Ethiopia) Mamitu Daska (f)
- October 30: (China) Shanghai Marathon
  - Winners: (South Africa) Stephen Mokoka (m) / (Ethiopia) Roza Dereje (f)
- November 13: (Turkey) Istanbul Marathon
  - Winners: (Turkey) Ali Kaya (m) / (Kenya) Violah Jepchumba (f)
- November 20: (Spain) Maraton Valencia Trinidad Alfonso
  - Winners: (Kenya) Victor Kipchirchir (m) / (Kenya) Valary Jemeli Aiyabei (f)
- December 4: (Japan) Fukuoka Marathon (co-final & men only)
  - Winner: (Ethiopia) Yemane Tsegay
- December 4: Singapore Marathon (co-final)
  - Winners: (Kenya) Felix Kiptoo Kirwa (m) / (Kenya) Rebecca Kangogo Chesir (f)

=== 2016 IAAF Road Race Label Events (Silver) ===
- January 31: (Japan) Osaka International Ladies Marathon (women only)
  - Winner: (Japan) Kayoko Fukushi
- February 7: (Japan) Kagawa Marugame Half Marathon
  - Winners: (Eritrea) Goitom Kifle (m) / (Bahrain) Eunice Kirwa (f)
- April 3: (South Korea) Daegu Marathon
  - Winners: (Kenya) James Kwambai (m) / (Kenya) Caroline Kilel (f)
- April 10: (Republic of Ireland) Great Ireland Run
  - Winners: (United Kingdom) Andy Maud (m) / (Republic of Ireland) Fionnuala McCormack (f)
- April 10: (Germany) Hannover Marathon
  - Winners: (South Africa) Lusapho April (m) / (Kenya) Edinah Kwambai (f)
- April 17: (Poland) DOZ Marathon Łódź with PZU
  - Winners: (Ethiopia) Abraraw Misganaw (m) / (Kenya) Racheal Mutgaa (f)
- April 24: (Spain) Madrid Marathon
  - Winners: (Kenya) Peter Kiplagat Chebet (m) / (Ethiopia) Askale Alemayehu (f)
- April 24: (Poland) Warsaw Marathon
  - Winners: (Poland) Artur Kozłowski (m) / (Ethiopia) Kumesci Sichala (f)
- May 8: (China) Yellow River Estuary International Marathon
  - Winners: (Kenya) Dickson Kipsang Tuwei (m) / (Bahrain) Eunice Chumba (f)
- May 15: (Japan) Gifu Seiryu Half Marathon
  - Winners: (Kenya) Patrick Mwaka (m) / (Bahrain) Eunice Kirwa (f)
- September 18: (South Africa) Cape Town Marathon
  - Winners: (Ethiopia) Asefa Mengstu Negewo (m) / (United Kingdom) Tish Jones (f)
- September 18: (Netherlands) Dam tot Damloop
  - Winners: (Kenya) Edwin Kiptoo (m) / (Kenya) Alice Aprot Nawowuna (f)
- September 18: (Denmark) Copenhagen Half Marathon
  - Winners: (Kenya) James Mwangi Wangari (m) / (Ethiopia) Hiwot Gebrekidan (f)
- October 30: (France) Marseille-Cassis 20km
  - Winners: (Kenya) Henry Kiplagat (m) / (Kenya) Joyline Jepkosgei (f)
- November 13: (Japan) Saitama International Marathon (women only)
  - Winner: (Kenya) Flomena Cheyech Daniel
- November 13: (Lebanon) Beirut Marathon
  - Winners: (Kenya) Edwin Kibet Kiptoo (m) / (Ethiopia) Tigist Girma (f)
- December 18: (France) Corrida de Houilles
  - Winners: (Kenya) Cornelius Kangogo (m) / (Kenya) Viola Kibiwot (f)
- December 31: (Spain) San Silvestre Vallecana (final)
  - Winners: (Eritrea) Nguse Tesfaldet (m) / (Kenya) Brigid Chepchirchir Kosgei (f)

=== 2016 IAAF Road Race Label Events (Bronze) ===
- January 17: (United States) Houston Marathon
  - Winners: (Ethiopia) Gebo Burka (m) / (Ethiopia) Biruktayit Degefa Eshetu (f)
- February 14: (Spain) Mitja Marató de Barcelona
  - Winners: (Kenya) Vincent Kipruto (m) / (Kenya) Florence Kiplagat (f)
- February 21: (Spain) Seville Marathon
  - Winners: (Kenya) Cosmas Kiplimo Lagat (m) / (Spain) Paula González (f)
- March 13: (Spain) Barcelona Marathon
  - Winners: (Ethiopia) Dino Sefir (m) / (Kenya) Valerie Aiyabei (f)
- March 20: (Chinese Taipei) Taipei International Marathon
  - Winners: (Kenya) William Chebon Chebor (m) / (Ukraine) Olha Kotovska (f)
- March 20: (China) Chongqing International Marathon
  - Winners: (Ethiopia) Kelkile Gezahegn (m) / (China) Liu Ruihuan (f)
- April 3: (Italy) Milano City Marathon
  - Winners: (Kenya) Ernest Kiprono Ngeno (m) / (Kenya) Brigid Kosgei (f)
- April 17: (Japan) Nagano Olympic Commemorative Marathon
  - Winners: (Kenya) Jairus Chanchima (m) / (Ethiopia) Shasho Insermu (f)
- April 17: (United Kingdom) Brighton Marathon
  - Winners: (Kenya) Duncan Maiyo (m) / (Kenya) Grace Momanyi (f)
- April 24: (Turkey) Istanbul Half Marathon
  - Winners: (Turkey) Ali Kaya (m) / (Kenya) Violah Jepchumba (f)
- May 7: (Nigeria) Okpekpe International 10 km Road Race
  - Winners: (Kenya) Simon Cheprot (m) / (Kenya) Polline Njeru (f)
- May 8: (Switzerland) Geneva Marathon
  - Winners: (Kenya) Julius Chepkwony (m) / (Kenya) Jane Kiptoo (f)
- May 15: (Latvia) Riga Marathon
  - Winners: (Kenya) Dominic Kangor (m) / (Ethiopia) Shitaye Gemechu (f)
- May 29: (United Kingdom) Edinburgh Marathon
  - Winners: (Kenya) Boaz Kiprono (m) / (Kenya) Eddah Jepkosgei (f)
- June 11: (China) Lanzhou International Marathon
  - Winners: (Kenya) Robert Kwambai (m) / (Ethiopia) Tsehay Desalegn (f)
- June 18: (France) Corrida de Langueux
  - Winners: (Kenya) Robert Kaptingei (m) / (Ethiopia) Meskerem Amare (f)
- June 26: (United States) B.A.A. 10K
  - Winners: (Kenya) Daniel Kipchumba Chebii (m) / (United States) Shalane Flanagan (f)
- August 28: Mexico City Marathon
  - Winners: (Kenya) Emmanuel Mnangat Chamer (m) / (Lithuania) Diana Lobačevskė (f)
- September 25: (Poland) Warsaw Marathon
  - Winners: (Kenya) Ezekiel Omullo (m) / (Bahrain) Gladys Kibiwot (f)
- October 2: (United Kingdom) Bournemouth Marathon
  - Winners: (Kenya) Stanley Kiprotich Bett (m) / (Kenya) Eddah Jepkosgei (f)
- October 2: (Slovakia) Košice Peace Marathon
  - Winners: (Kenya) David Kemboi Kiyeng (m) / (Ethiopia) Chaltu Tafa Waka (f)
- October 2: (United Kingdom) Cardiff Half Marathon
  - Winners: (Kenya) Shedrack Korir (m) / (Kenya) Violah Jepchumba (f)
- October 23: (Italy) Venice Marathon
  - Winners: (Kenya) Julius Chepkwony Rotich (m) / (Kenya) Priscah Jepleting Cherono (f)
- November 13: (France) French Riviera Marathon
  - Winners: (Kenya) Elisha Kipchirchir (m) / (Ethiopia) Konjit Tilahun (f)
- November 20: (France) Boulogne-Billancourt Half Marathon
  - Winners: (Kenya) Morris Munene (m) / (Ethiopia) Gebeyanesh Ayele (f)
- November 20: (India) Delhi Half Marathon
  - Winners: (Kenya) Eliud Kipchoge (m) / (Ethiopia) Worknesh Degefa (f)
- December 11: (China) Guangzhou Marathon (final)
  - Winners: (Morocco) Salah-Eddine Bounasr (m) / (Ethiopia) Aynalem Kassahun

=== European Athletics Association (EAA) ===
- July 6–10: 2016 European Athletics Championships in (Netherlands) Amsterdam
  - Poland won the gold medal tally. Germany and Great Britain won 16 overall medals each.
- July 14–17: 2016 European Athletics Youth Championships in (Georgia (country)) Tbilisi (debut event)
  - Great Britain won both the gold and overall medal tallies.
- December 11: 2016 European Cross Country Championships in Chia, Italy
  - Men's winner: (Turkey) Aras Kaya
  - Women's winner: (Turkey) Yasemin Can

=== Confederation of African Athletics (CAA) ===
- March 12: 2016 African Cross Country Championships in (Cameroon) Yaoundé
  - Senior Men: (Kenya) James Gitahi Rungaru
  - Senior Women: (Kenya) Alice Aprot Nawowuna
  - Junior Men: (Kenya) Isaac Kipsang
  - Junior Women: (Kenya) Miriam Cherop
- June 20–26: 2016 African Championships in Athletics in Durban
  - South Africa won both the gold and overall medal tallies.

=== NACAC ===
- March 4 & 5: 2016 NACAC Cross Country Championships in (Venezuela) Vargas
  - Men's winner: (United States) Donald Cowart
  - Women's winner: (United States) Allison Grace Morgan
- June 17–19: 2016 Central American Championships in Athletics in San Salvador
  - Overall winners: Guatemala (110.50 points), 2. Costa Rica (102.50 points), 3. El Salvador (86 points)
- July 13–18: 2016 NACAC Under-23 Championships in Athletics in (El Salvador) San Salvador
  - The United States won both the gold and overall medal tallies.

=== CONSUDATLE ===
- April 10: 2016 South American Marathon Championships in (Uruguay) Montevideo
  - Men's winner: (Uruguay) Aguelmis Rojas
  - Women's winner: (Peru) Gladys Machacuay
- May 29: 2016 South American Half Marathon Championships in (Paraguay) Asunción
  - Men's winner: (Peru) Ferdinan Pacheco
  - Women's winner: (Brazil) Joziane da Silva
- September 24 & 25: 2016 South American Under-23 Championships in Athletics in (Peru) Lima
  - Brazil won both the gold and overall medal tallies.
- November 12 & 13: 2016 South American Youth Championships in Athletics in (Argentina) Concordia, Entre Ríos
  - Brazil won both the gold and overall medal tallies.

=== Asian Athletics Association (AAA) ===
- February 19 – 21: 2016 Asian Indoor Athletics Championships in Doha
  - Qatar won the gold medal tally. China won the overall medal tally.
- February 29: 2016 Asian Cross Country Championships in (Bahrain) Manama
  - Men: (Bahrain) Albert Kibichii Rop
  - Women: (Bahrain) Eunice Chumba
  - Junior Men: (Bahrain) Ali Abdi
  - Junior Women: (Bahrain) Dalila Abdulkadir
- June 2–6: 2016 Asian Junior Athletics Championships in (Vietnam) Ho Chi Minh City
  - Japan won both the gold and overall medal tallies.

=== Oceania Athletics Association (OAA) ===
- Note: The Oceania Athletics Championships were divided into Polynesian, Micronesian, and Melanesian regional athletics championships.
- April 7 – 9: 2016 Polynesian Regional Championships in Athletics in (French Polynesia) Papeete (indoor)
  - For results, click here.
- June 3–5: 2016 Micronesian Regional Championships in Athletics in (Federated States of Micronesia) Pohnpei
  - For results, click here.
- July 2 & 3: 2016 Oceania Marathon and Half Marathon Championships in (Australia) Gold Coast, Queensland
  - For the regular marathon results, click here.
  - Men's Half Marathon winner: (Australia) Duer Yoa
  - Women's Half Marathon winner: (Australia) Cassie Fien
- July 7–9: 2016 Melanesian Championships in Athletics in (Fiji) Suva
  - Australia won both the gold and overall medal tallies.
- August 7: 2016 Oceania Cross Country Championships in (New Zealand) Auckland
  - Men's 10 km CC: (Australia) Nicholas Wightman
  - Women's 10 km CC: (New Zealand) Laura Nagel

=== 2016 IAAF Diamond League ===
- Note: The Adidas Grand Prix event in New York City has been replaced by Rabat here.
- May 6: Qatar Athletic Super Grand Prix in Doha
  - The United States won the gold medal tally. Kenya won the overall medal tally.
- May 14: Shanghai Golden Grand Prix in China
  - China, Kenya, and the United States won 3 gold medals each. China won the overall medal tally.
- May 22: Meeting International Mohammed VI d'Athlétisme de Rabat in Morocco (debut event)
  - Ethiopia, Kenya, South Africa, the United States, and Jamaica won 2 gold medals each. Kenya won the overall medal tally.
- May 28: Prefontaine Classic in Eugene, Oregon
  - The United States won both the gold and overall medal tallies.
- June 2: Golden Gala in (Italy) Rome
  - South Africa won the gold medal tally. Kenya won the overall medal tally.
- June 5: British Grand Prix in (United Kingdom) Birmingham
  - The United States won both the gold and overall medal tallies.
- June 9: Bislett Games in (Norway) Oslo
  - Kenya won the gold medal tally. The United States won the overall medal tally.
- June 16: Stockholm Bauhaus Athletics in Sweden
  - Sweden won both the gold and overall medal tallies.
- July 15: Herculis in Fontvieille, Monaco
  - Kenya won both the gold and overall medal tallies.
- July 22 & 23: London Grand Prix in Great Britain
  - Great Britain won the gold medal tally. The United States won the overall medal tally.
- August 25: Athletissima in (Switzerland) Lausanne
  - The United States won both the gold and overall medal tallies.
- August 27: Meeting Areva in (France) Saint-Denis
  - The United States won both the gold and overall medal tallies.
- September 1: Weltklasse Zürich in Switzerland
  - The United States won both the gold and overall medal tallies.
- September 9: Memorial Van Damme (final) in (Belgium) Brussels
  - The United States won both the gold and overall medal tallies.

=== 2016 IAAF World Indoor Tour ===
- Note: The Russian Winter Meeting event, scheduled for February 14, has been suspended, due to WADA's reports and the IAAF votes against the ARAF.
- February 6: Weltklasse in Karlsruhe in Germany
  - The United States won both the gold and overall medal tallies.
- February 14: New Balance Indoor Grand Prix in Roxbury, Boston
  - The United States won both the gold and overall medal tallies.
- February 17: XL Galan in (Sweden) Stockholm
  - Eight nations won a gold medal each. Ethiopia won the overall medal tally.
- February 20: Sainsbury's Glasgow Indoor Grand Prix (final) in Great Britain
  - Great Britain won both the gold and overall medal tallies.

=== 2016 IAAF Cross Country Permit ===
- November 15, 2015: Cross de Atapuerca in (Spain) Atapuerca, province of Burgos
  - Winners: (Ethiopia) Imane Merga (m) / (Ethiopia) Belaynesh Oljira (f)
- January 6: Campaccio in (Italy) San Giorgio su Legnano
  - Winners: (Ethiopia) Imane Merga (m) / (Kenya) Alice Aprot (f)
- January 16: Antrim International Cross Country in (United Kingdom) Antrim, County Antrim
  - Winners: (Bahrain) Aweke Ayalew (m) / (Kenya) Alice Aprot (f)
- January 17: Cross Internacional de Itálica in (Spain) Seville
  - Winners: (Ethiopia) Tamirat Tola (m) / (Kenya) Faith Kipyegon (f)
- January 24: Cross Internacional Juan Muguerza in (Spain) Elgoibar
  - Winners: (Bahrain) Aweke Ayalew (m) / (Kenya) Irene Chepet Cheptai (f)
- January 31: Cinque Mulini in (Italy) San Vittore Olona
  - Winners: (Kenya) Jairus Birech (m) / (Kenya) Faith Kipyegon (f)
- February 13: IAAF Permit/Athletics Kenya Cross Country in Nairobi
  - Winners: (Kenya) Geoffrey Kipsang (m) / (Kenya) Alice Aprot (f)
- March 13: Almond Blossom Cross Country (final) in (Portugal) Albufeira
  - Winners: (Cape Verde) Nelson Cruz (m) / (Portugal) Carla Salome Rocha (f)

=== 2016 IAAF Race Walking Challenge ===
- February 21: Oceania 20 km Race Walk Championships in (Australia) Adelaide
  - Men's winner: (Australia) Dane Bird-Smith
  - Women's winner: (Australia) Rachel Tallent
- March 6: Circuito Internacional de Marcha 2016 in (Mexico) Ciudad Juárez
  - Men's 50 km walk winner: (Ecuador) Andrés Chocho
  - Men's 20 km walk winner: (Mexico) Horacio Nava
  - Men's 10 km walk winner: (Mexico) Andrés Olivas
  - Women's 20 km walk winner: (Mexico) María Guadalupe González
  - Women's 10 km walk winner: (Mexico) Valeria Ortuño
- March 19: IAAF Race Walking Challenge Permit Meeting Dudinska 50 in (Slovakia) Dudince
  - Men's 50 km walk winner: (Poland) Rafał Augustyn
  - Men's 20 km walk winner: (United Kingdom) Tom Bosworth
  - Women's 20 km walk winner: (Italy) Eleonora Giorgi
- March 20: Asian 20 km Race Walking Championships in (Japan) Nomi, Ishikawa
  - Men's winner: (Japan) Daisuke Matsunaga
  - Women's winner: (China) Wang Na
- April 3: South American Race Walking Cup in (Ecuador) Guayaquil
  - Men's winner: (Ecuador) Andrés Chocho
  - Women's winner: (Brazil) Érica de Sena
- April 9: 25º Grande Prémio Internacional de Rio Maior em Marcha Atlética in Portugal
  - Men's winner: (Spain) Álvaro Martín
  - Women's winner: (China) Qieyang Shenjie
- April 23: 2016 IAAF Race Walking Challenge in (China) Taicang
  - Men's winner: (Mexico) Pedro Daniel Gomez
  - Women's winner: (China) Wang Yingliu
- May 28: XXX Gran Premio Cantones de La Coruña in Spain
  - Men's winner: (China) Wang Zhen
  - Women's winner: (China) Liu Hong
- June 22–26: Part of the 2016 African Championships in Athletics (final) in (South Africa) Durban
  - Men's winner: (Kenya) Samuel Ireri Gathimba
  - Women's winner: (Kenya) Grace Wanjiru

=== 2016 IAAF Combined Events Challenge ===
- March 31 & April 1: Oceania Combined Events Championships in (Australia) Sydney
  - Decathlon winner: (Australia) Cedric Dubler (8,114 points)
  - Heptathlon winner: (Australia) Sophie Stanwell (5,572 points)
- April 2 & 3: African Combined Events Championships in (Mauritius) Moka (Réduit)
  - Decathlon winner: (Mauritius) Guillaume Thierry (7,481 points)
  - Heptathlon winner: (Burkina Faso) Marthe Koala (5,771 points)
- April 29 & 30: 29th Multistars – Trofeo Zerneri Acciai in (Italy) Florence
  - Decathlon winner: (Norway) Lars Vikan Rise (7,868 points)
  - Heptathlon winner: (Brazil) Vanessa Spínola (6,100 points)
- May 28 & 29: 42nd Hypo-Meeting in (Austria) Götzis
  - Decathlon winner: (Canada) Damian Warner (8,523 points)
  - Heptathlon winner: (Canada) Brianne Theisen-Eaton (6,765 points)
- June 10 & 11: 10th TNT Express Meeting in (Czech Republic) Kladno
  - Decathlon winner: (Norway) Lars Vikan Rise (7,925 points)
  - Heptathlon winner: (Czech Republic) Kateřina Cachová (6,328 points)
- June 17–19: 2016 Pan American Combined Events Cup in (Canada) Ottawa
  - Decathlon winner: (United States) Filip Scott (7,726 points)
  - Heptathlon winner: (United States) Quintunya Chapman (6,035 points)
- June 25 & 26: 20th Mehrkampf-Meeting Ratingen in Germany
  - Decathlon winner: (Germany) Arthur Abele (8,605 points)
  - Heptathlon winner: (United Kingdom) Jessica Ennis-Hill (6,733 points)
- July 1–10: Part of the U.S. Olympic Trials in (United States) Eugene, Oregon
  - Decathlon winner: (Oregon) Ashton Eaton (8,750 points)
  - Heptathlon winner: (California) Barbara Nwaba (6,494 points)
- July 6–10: Part of the 2016 European Athletics Championships in (Netherlands) Amsterdam
  - Decathlon winner: (Belgium) Thomas Van der Plaetsen (8,218 points)
  - Heptathlon winner: (Netherlands) Anouk Vetter (6,626 points)
- September 17 & 18: Décastar (final) in (France) Talence
  - Decathlon winner: (Ukraine) Oleksiy Kasyanov (8,077 points)
  - Heptathlon winner: (Netherlands) Nadine Broersen (6,377 points)

=== 2016 IAAF World Challenge & IAAF Hammer Throw Challenge ===
- Note: The event for Rabat here has been promoted to the 2016 IAAF Diamond League.
- March 5: Melbourne Track Classic in Australia
  - World Challenge: Australia won both the gold and overall medal tallies.
  - Hammer Throw winner: (Australia) Matthew Denny
- May 7: Jamaica International Invitational in Kingston, Jamaica
  - World Challenge: The United States won both the gold and overall medal tallies.
  - Hammer Throw winner: (United States) Gwen Berry
- May 8: Golden Grand Prix in Kawasaki, Kanagawa (World Challenge only)
  - World Challenge: The United States won the gold medal tally. Japan won the overall medal tally.
- May 18: IAAF World Challenge Beijing in China
  - World Challenge: China won both the gold and overall medal tallies.
  - Hammer Throw winner: (China) Zhang Wenxiu
- May 19 & 20: Golden Spike Ostrava in the Czech Republic
  - World Challenge: Poland won both the gold and overall medal tallies.
  - Men's Hammer Throw winner: (Poland) Paweł Fajdek
  - Women's Hammer Throw winner: (Poland) Anita Włodarczyk
- May 22: Fanny Blankers-Koen Games in Hengelo (World Challenge only)
  - World Challenge: China and Ethiopia won 3 gold medals each. The Netherlands won the overall medal tally.
- May 25: Meeting Grand Prix IAAF de Dakar in Senegal
  - World Challenge: The United States won the gold medal tally. The United States and South Africa won 5 overall medals each.
  - Men's Hammer Throw winner: (Belarus) Pavel Bareisha
  - Women's Hammer Throw winner: (Moldova) Zalina Marghieva
- June 18: Janusz Kusociński Memorial in (Poland) Szczecin (Hammer Throw Challenge only)
  - Men's Hammer Throw winner: (Poland) Paweł Fajdek
  - Women's Hammer Throw winner: (Poland) Anita Włodarczyk
- June 19: Grande Premio Brasil Caixa de Atletismo in São Bernardo do Campo
  - World Challenge: Brazil won both the gold and overall medal tallies.
  - Women's Hammer Throw winner: (Argentina) Jennifer Dahlgren
- June 23: Meeting de Atletismo Madrid in Spain (World Challenge only)
  - World Challenge: Spain won both the gold and overall medal tallies.
- June 29: Paavo Nurmi Games in (Finland) Turku (Hammer Throw Challenge only)
  - Men's Hammer Throw winner: (Poland) Paweł Fajdek
- July 18: István Gyulai Memorial in (Hungary) Székesfehérvár (Hammer Throw Challenge only)
  - Women's Hammer Throw winner: (Poland) Anita Włodarczyk
- September 3: ISTAF Berlin in Germany (World Challenge only)
  - World Challenge: Germany won both the gold and overall medal tallies.
- September 6: Hanžeković Memorial (final) in (Croatia) Zagreb (World Challenge only)
  - World Challenge: The United States won both the gold and overall medal tallies.
- September 11: Rieti Meeting in Italy
  - Event cancelled.

== Deaths ==
Athlete	Nation	Occupation	Age	Date	Ref
John Disley	United Kingdom	Steeplechaser	87	February 8	
Yuriy Dumchev	Russia	Discus thrower	57	February 10	
Dick Brown	United States	Coach	78	February 27	
Iolanda Balas	Romania	High jumper	79	March 11	
Edmund Piątkowski	Poland	Discus thrower	80	March 28	
Carlo Monti	Italy	Sprinter	96	April 7	
Ferenc Paragi	Hungary	Javelin thrower	62	April 21	
Mike Agostini	Trinidad and Tobago	Sprinter	81	May 12	
Mark Ouma	Uganda	Journalist	55	July 10	
John Holt	United Kingdom	Athlete and administrator	77	November 17	
Cecil Smith	Canada	Administrator	80	December 2	
Miruts Yifter	Ethiopia	Distance runner	72	December 22	
