= 2004 Asian Cross Country Championships =

The 7th Asian Cross Country Championships took place 2004 in Pune, India. Team rankings were decided by a combination of each nation's top three athletes finishing positions.

== Medalists ==
Event	Gold	Silver	Bronze
Senior Men Individual	Han Gang (CHN)	Chen Mingfu (CHN)	Deng Haiyang (CHN)
Senior Men Team	China (CHN)	India (IND)	Iran (IRI)
Junior Men Individual	Satoru Kitamura (JPN)	Yuki Sato (JPN)	Yuichiro Ueno (JPN)
Junior Men Team	Japan (JPN)	India (IND)	Iran (IRI)
Senior Women Individual	Yumi Sato (JPN)	Ayako Suzuki (JPN)	Shi Hongjuan (CHN)
Senior Women Team	Japan (JPN)	India (IND)	None (25x17px)
Junior Women Individual	Bao Guiying (CHN)	Misaki Katsumata (JPN)	Zhu Yanmei (CHN)
Junior Women Team	Japan (JPN)	India (IND)	Singapore (SIN)

== Medal table ==
Rank	Nation	Gold	Silver	Bronze	Total
1	Japan (JPN)	5	3	1	9
2	China (CHN)	3	1	3	7
3	India (IND)	0	4	0	4
4	Iran (IRI)	0	0	2	2
5	Singapore (SIN)	0	0	1	1
Totals (5 entries)		8	8	7	23
