= Asian Cross Country Championships =

Biennial running competition

- Status: Active
- Genre: Cross country running Event
- Date: Midyear
- Frequency: Biannual
- Years active: 1991-ongoing
- Inaugurated: 1991 Fukuoka
- Next event: 2024
- Organiser: AAA
- Website: www.athleticsasia.org
- 2023 Kathmandu

The Asian Cross Country Championships is a biennial regional cross country running competition for athletes from Asia. It is organised by the Asian Athletics Association and was first held in 1991 in Fukuoka, Japan. The competition has been held every two years since then, although the 2003 edition was postponed due to political conflicts within the region.

The championships comprises four races: separate senior races for men and for women, and two corresponding junior races for the sexes. Furthermore, in each of the four races athletes compete simultaneously for both individual medals and team medals. For the team competitions, the final positions of the best finishing runners from each country are combined and the team with the lowest points total wins.

Athletes and teams of Japan, China and Iran have historically been the most successful of the championships. However, Qatar and Bahrain have become increasingly dominant since 2005, led by a number of East African-born athletes who have transferred allegiance to the small Middle-Eastern states.

The 2011 edition, set for February in Kathmandu, was postponed after the Nepalese government did not provide the requisite funds needed to host the event. China took over the hosting rights and held the 11th edition the following year in Qingzhen.

The 2020 edition of the race, originally set for March in Hong Kong, was postponed due to the coronavirus pandemic.

== Editions ==
Edition	Year	Venue	City	Country	Events
1	1991		Fukuoka	Japan	8
2	1993		Jakarta	Indonesia	8
3	1995	Chiba International Cross Country	Chiba	Japan	8
4	1997	Chiba International Cross Country	Chiba	Japan	8
5	1999	Enghelab Sport Complex (Men)	Tehran	Iran	4
5	1999	(Women)	Hong Kong	Hong Kong	4
6	2001		Kathmandu	Nepal	8
7	2004		Pune	India	8
8	2005		Guiyang	China	8
9	2007	Al Bisharat Golf Club	Amman	Jordan	8
10	2009	Al-Rafah Bahrain Hippodrome	Manama	Bahrain	8
–	2011	Not held	Kathmandu	Nepal	8
11	2012		Qingzhen	China	8
12	2014	Fukuoka International Cross Country	Fukuoka	Japan	8
13	2016		Manama	Bahrain	8
14	2018		Guiyang	China	8
15	2020	Cancelled due to COVID-19 pandemic			
16	2023	Gokarna Forest Resort	Kathmandu	Nepal	8
17	2024	Fanling Golf Park	Hong Kong	Hong Kong	8
18	2026		Fukuoka	Japan	

== Champions ==
http://www.gbrathletics.com/ic/cxc.htm#AS

=== Senior ===
Year	Men's senior race		Women's senior race	
Year	Individual	Team	Individual	Team
1991	Shozo Shimoju (JPN)	Japan (JPN)	Mun Gyong-Ae (PRK)	North Korea (PRK)
1993	Hamid Sajjadi (IRI)	India (IND)	Minori Hayakari (JPN)	Japan (JPN)
1995	Seiichi Miyajima (JPN)	Japan (JPN)	Atsumi Yashima (JPN)	Japan (JPN)
1997	Saad Shaddad Al-Asmari (KSA)	Saudi Arabia (KSA)	Chiemi Takahashi (JPN)	Japan (JPN)
1999	Ahmad Zarekar (IRI)	Japan (JPN)	Mizuki Noguchi (JPN)	Japan (JPN)
2001	Jafar Babakhani (IRI)	Sri Lanka (SRI)	Yasuyo Iwamoto (JPN)	Japan (JPN)
2004	Han Gang (CHN)	China (CHN)	Yumi Sato (JPN)	Japan (JPN)
2005	Han Gang (CHN)	Qatar (QAT)	Li Helan (CHN)	China (CHN)
2007	Ahmed Hassan Abdullah (QAT)	Qatar (QAT)	Maryam Yusuf Jamal (BHR)	Bahrain (BHR)
2009	Ahmed Hassan Abdullah (QAT)	Qatar (QAT)	Maryam Yusuf Jamal (BHR)	Japan (JPN)
2012	Alemu Bekele (BHR)	Bahrain (BHR)	Shitaye Eshete (BHR)	Bahrain (BHR)
2014	Aweke Yimer (BHR)	Bahrain (BHR)	Tejitu Chalchissa (BHR)	Bahrain (BHR)
2016	Albert Rop (BHR)	Bahrain (BHR)	Eunice Chumba (BHR)	Bahrain (BHR)
2018	Peng Jianhua (CHN)	Japan (JPN)	Li Dan (CHN)	Japan (JPN)
2023	Deepak Adhikari (NEP)	Nepal (NEP)	Yua Sarumida (JPN)	India (IND)
2024	Gulveer Singh (IND)	India (IND)	Seema (IND)	India (IND)

=== Junior ===
Year	Men's junior race		Women's junior race	
Year	Individual	Team	Individual	Team
1991	Yasuyuki Watanabe (JPN)	Japan (JPN)	Qu Yunxia (CHN)	China (CHN)
1993	Awad Saleh Nasser (YEM)	Yemen (YEM)	Noriko Wada (JPN)	Japan (JPN)
1995	Tadayuki Ojima (JPN)	Japan (JPN)	Chiemi Takahashi (JPN)	Japan (JPN)
1997	Mohamed Al-Shinan (KSA)	Japan (JPN)	Kumiko Hiyama (JPN)	Japan (JPN)
1999	Zhong Haibo (CHN)	Japan (JPN)	Kaori Yoshida (JPN)	Japan (JPN)
2001	Tomohiro Uemura (JPN)	Japan (JPN)	Mika Okunaga (JPN)	Japan (JPN)
2004	Satoru Kitamura (JPN)	Japan (JPN)	Bao Guiying (CHN)	Japan (JPN)
2005	Lin Xiangqian (CHN)	China (CHN)	Zhu Yanmei (CHN)	China (CHN)
2007	Thamer Kamal Ali (QAT)	Qatar (QAT)	Monica Raut (IND)	India (IND)
2009	Alemu Bekele (BHR)	Bahrain (BHR)	Shitaye Eshete (BHR)	Bahrain (BHR)
2012	Shota Baba (JPN)	Japan (JPN)	Miyuki Uehara (JPN)	Japan (JPN)
2014	Kazuto Kawabata (JPN)	Japan (JPN)	Yuka Kobayashi (JPN)	Japan (JPN)
2016	Ali Abdi (BHR)	Bahrain (BHR)	Dalila Abdulkadir (BHR)	Bahrain (BHR)
2018	Suolang Cairen (CHN)	Japan (JPN)	Yuna Wada (JPN)	Japan (JPN)
2023	Samir Eghbalighahyazi (IRI)	India (IND)	Srushti Shridhar Redekar (IND)	India (IND)
2024	Vinod Singh (IND)	India (IND)	Li Yuan (CHN)	India (IND)

== All time medal table ==
As 2018

Rank	Nation	Gold	Silver	Bronze	Total
1	Japan	53	45	30	128
2	Bahrain	23	14	9	46
3	China	16	23	12	51
4	India	7	15	13	35
5	Qatar	6	2	5	13
6	Iran	4	7	16	27
7	Saudi Arabia	3	1	2	6
7	Yemen	3	1	2	6
9	Nepal	2	4	3	9
10	North Korea	2	1	2	5
11	Sri Lanka	1	1	2	4
12	South Korea	0	1	5	6
13	Jordan	0	1	2	3
14	Pakistan	0	1	1	2
15	United Arab Emirates	0	1	0	1
16	Singapore	0	0	2	2
16	Vietnam	0	0	2	2
18	Hong Kong	0	0	1	1
18	Indonesia	0	0	1	1
18	Thailand	0	0	1	1
Totals (20 entries)		120	118	111	349
