= 2005 Asian Cross Country Championships =

The 8th Asian Cross Country Championships took place on March 12, 2005, in Guiyang, China. Team rankings were decided by a combination of each nation's top three athletes finishing positions.

== Medalists ==
| Event | Gold | Silver | Bronze |
|---|---|---|---|
| Senior Men Individual | Han Gang (CHN) | Zhang Yunshan (CHN) | Ahmad Juma Jaber (QAT) |
| Senior Men Team | Qatar (QAT) | China (CHN) | Iran (IRI) |
| Junior Men Individual | Lin Xiangqian (CHN) | Zhang Wenliang (CHN) | Yuji Saito (JPN) |
| Junior Men Team | China (CHN) | Japan (JPN) | Iran (IRI) |
| Senior Women Individual | Li Helan (CHN) | Rina Fujioka (JPN) | Chen Xiaofang (CHN) |
| Senior Women Team | China (CHN) | Japan (JPN) | India (IND) |
| Junior Women Individual | Zhu Yanmei (CHN) | Akie Oshiyama (JPN) | Wang Shijuan (CHN) |
| Junior Women Team | China (CHN) | Japan (JPN) | Singapore (SIN) |

== Medal table ==
| Rank | Nation | Gold | Silver | Bronze | Total |
|---|---|---|---|---|---|
| 1 | China (CHN) | 7 | 3 | 2 | 12 |
| 2 | Qatar (QAT) | 1 | 0 | 1 | 2 |
| 3 | Japan (JPN) | 0 | 5 | 1 | 6 |
| 4 | Iran (IRI) | 0 | 0 | 2 | 2 |
| 5 | India (IND) | 0 | 0 | 1 | 1 |
| 5 | Singapore (SIN) | 0 | 0 | 1 | 1 |
| Totals (6 entries) | | 8 | 8 | 8 | 24 |
