= 1995 Asian Cross Country Championships =

Sports event

The 3rd Asian Cross Country Championships took place 1995 in Chiba, Japan. Team rankings were decided by a combination of each nation's top three athletes finishing positions.

== Medalists ==
Event	Gold	Silver	Bronze
Senior Men Individual	Seiichi Miyajima (JPN)	Yoshinori Yokota (JPN)	Hamid Sadjadi Hezaveh (IRI)
Senior Men Team	Japan (JPN)	Iran (IRI)	China (CHN)
Junior Men Individual	Tadayuki Ojima (JPN)	Akira Kiniwa (JPN)	Yukihiro Yoshida (JPN)
Junior Men Team	Japan (JPN)	China (CHN)	Republic of Korea (KOR)
Senior Women Individual	Atsumi Yashima (JPN)	Michiko Shimizu (JPN)	Yasuko Kimura (JPN)
Senior Women Team	Japan (JPN)	China (CHN)	Hong Kong (HKG)
Junior Women Individual	Chiemi Takahashi (JPN)	Miwa Sugawara (JPN)	Rie Ueno (JPN)
Junior Women Team	Japan (JPN)	China (CHN)	Republic of Korea (KOR)

== Medal table ==
Rank	Nation	Gold	Silver	Bronze	Total
1	Japan (JPN)	8	4	3	15
2	China (CHN)	0	3	1	4
3	Iran (IRI)	0	1	1	2
4	South Korea (KOR)	0	0	2	2
5	Hong Kong (HKG)	0	0	1	1
Totals (5 entries)		8	8	8	24
