= 1997 Asian Cross Country Championships =

The 4th Asian Cross Country Championships took place 1997 in Chiba, Japan.

== Medalists ==
Event	Gold	Silver	Bronze
Senior Men Individual	Saad Shadad Al-Asmari (KSA)	Jafar Babakhani (IRI)	Osamu Nara (JPN)
Senior Men Team	Saudi Arabia (KSA)	Iran (IRI)	Japan (JPN)
Junior Men Individual	Mohammed Alshinan Safed (KSA)	Shinichiro Okuda (JPN)	Yoshitaka Iwamizu (JPN)
Junior Men Team	Japan (JPN)	Saudi Arabia (KSA)	China (CHN)
Senior Women Individual	Chiemi Takahashi (JPN)	Yang Siyu (CHN)	Sachie Ozaki (JPN)
Senior Women Team	Japan (JPN)	China (CHN)	India (IND)
Junior Women Individual	Kumiko Hiyama (JPN)	Emiko Kojima (JPN)	Yuko Manabe (JPN)
Junior Women Team	Japan (JPN)	China (CHN)	Republic of Korea (KOR)

== Medal table ==
Rank	Nation	Gold	Silver	Bronze	Total
1	Japan (JPN)	5	2	5	12
2	Saudi Arabia (KSA)	3	1	0	4
3	China (CHN)	0	3	1	4
4	Iran (IRI)	0	2	0	2
5	India (IND)	0	0	1	1
5	South Korea (KOR)	0	0	1	1
Totals (6 entries)		8	8	8	24
