= 2014 Asian Cross Country Championships =

International running competition

The 12th Asian Cross Country Championships took place on February 22, 2014, in Fukuoka, Japan.

== Medalists ==
Event	Gold	Silver	Bronze
Senior Men Individual	Aweke Yimer (BHR)	Isaac Korir (BHR)	Alemu Bekele (BHR)
Senior Men Team	Bahrain (BHR)	Japan (JPN)	Iran (IRI)
Junior Men Individual	Kazuto Kawabata (JPN)	Kento Hanazawa (JPN)	Yuichi Yasui (JPN)
Junior Men Team	Japan (JPN)	Iran (IRI)	Qatar (QAT)
Senior Women Individual	Tejitu Chalchissa (BHR)	Alia Saeed (UAE)	Mimi Gebreiorges (BHR)
Senior Women Team	Bahrain (BHR)	Japan (JPN)	China (CHN)
Junior Women Individual	Yuka Kobayashi (JPN)	Maki Izumida (JPN)	Kotona Oota (JPN)
Junior Women Team	Japan (JPN)	None	None

== Medal table ==
Rank	Nation	Gold	Silver	Bronze	Total
1	Japan (JPN)	4	4	2	10
2	Bahrain (BHR)	4	1	2	7
3	Iran (IRI)	0	1	1	2
4	United Arab Emirates (UAE)	0	1	0	1
5	China (CHN)	0	0	1	1
5	Qatar (QAT)	0	0	1	1
Totals (6 entries)		8	7	7	22
