= 2009 Asian Cross Country Championships =

The 10th Asian Cross Country Championships took place on March 1, 2009 in Manama, Bahrain. Team rankings were decided by a combination of each nation's top three athletes finishing positions.

== Medalists ==
Event	Gold	Silver	Bronze
Senior Men Individual	Ahmad Hassan Abdullah (QAT)	Essa Ismail Rahed (QAT)	Felix Kikway Kibore (QAT)
Senior Men Team	Qatar (QAT)	Bahrain (BHR)	India (IND)
Junior Men Individual	Gebre Alemu Bekele (BHR)	Edwin Chebii Kimurer (BHR)	Syota Hattory (JPN)
Junior Men Team	Bahrain (BHR)	Japan (JPN)	Yemen (YEM)
Senior Women Individual	Maryam Yusuf Jamal (BHR)	Mimi Belete (BHR)	Aya Nagata (JPN)
Senior Women Team	Japan (JPN)	Bahrain (BHR)	India (IND)
Junior Women Individual	Shitaye Eshete Habtegebrel (BHR)	Tejito Daba Chalchissa (BHR)	Aki Odagiri (JPN)
Junior Women Team	Bahrain (BHR)	Japan (JPN)	India (IND)

== Medal table ==
Rank	Nation	Gold	Silver	Bronze	Total
1	Bahrain (BHR)	5	5	0	10
2	Qatar (QAT)	2	1	1	4
3	Japan (JPN)	1	2	3	6
4	India (IND)	0	0	3	3
5	Yemen (YEM)	0	0	1	1
Totals (5 entries)		8	8	8	24
