= 1991 Asian Cross Country Championships =

The 1st Asian Cross Country Championships took place 1991 in Fukuoka, Japan.

== Medalists ==
| Event | Gold | Silver | Bronze |
|---|---|---|---|
| Senior Men Individual | Shozo Shimoju (JPN) | Zhang Fukui (CHN) | Han Zongmin (CHN) |
| Senior Men Team | Japan (JPN) | China (CHN) | Qatar (QAT) |
| Junior Men Individual | Yasuyuki Watanabe (JPN) | Katsuhiro Kawauchi (JPN) | Takaomi Kawanami (JPN) |
| Junior Men Team | Japan (JPN) | Republic of Korea (KOR) | Qatar (QAT) |
| Senior Women Individual | Mun Gyong-Ae (PRK) | Kim Ryon-Sun (PRK) | Kim Chun-Mae (PRK) |
| Senior Women Team | North Korea (PRK) | Japan (JPN) | India (IND) |
| Junior Women Individual | Qu Yunxia (CHN) | Li (CHN) | Azumi Miyazaki (JPN) |
| Junior Women Team | China (CHN) | Japan (JPN) | North Korea (PRK) |

== Medal table ==
| Rank | Nation | Gold | Silver | Bronze | Total |
|---|---|---|---|---|---|
| 1 | Japan (JPN) | 4 | 3 | 2 | 9 |
| 2 | China (CHN) | 2 | 3 | 1 | 6 |
| 3 | North Korea (PRK) | 2 | 1 | 2 | 5 |
| 4 | South Korea (KOR) | 0 | 1 | 0 | 1 |
| 5 | Qatar (QAT) | 0 | 0 | 2 | 2 |
| 6 | India (IND) | 0 | 0 | 1 | 1 |
| Totals (6 entries) | | 8 | 8 | 8 | 24 |
