= 1993 Asian Cross Country Championships =

The 2nd Asian Cross Country Championships took place 1993 in Jakarta, Indonesia. Team rankings were decided by a combination of each nation's top three athletes finishing positions.

== Medalists ==
Event	Gold	Silver	Bronze
Senior Men Individual	Hamid Sadjadi Hezaveh (IRI)	Dinesh Kumar (IND)	Fumio Ichi (JPN)
Senior Men Team	India (IND)	Sri Lanka (SRI)	Indonesia (INA)
Junior Men Individual	Awadh Saleh Nasser (YEM)	Anwar Omar Mohammed (YEM)	Gheibali Mohebbi (IRI)
Junior Men Team	Yemen (YEM)	India (IND)	Iran (IRI)
Senior Women Individual	Minori Hayakari (JPN)	Junko Tsukamoto (JPN)	Kayoko Ogiwara (JPN)
Senior Women Team	Japan (JPN)	India (IND)	Vietnam (VIE)
Junior Women Individual	Noriko Wada (JPN)	Kanako Haginaga (JPN)	Keiko Hatanaka (JPN)
Junior Women Team	Japan (JPN)	India (IND)	Vietnam (VIE)

== Medal table ==
Rank	Nation	Gold	Silver	Bronze	Total
1	Japan (JPN)	4	2	3	9
2	Yemen (YEM)	2	1	0	3
3	India (IND)	1	4	0	5
4	Iran (IRI)	1	0	2	3
5	Sri Lanka (SRI)	0	1	0	1
6	Vietnam (VIE)	0	0	2	2
7	Indonesia (INA)	0	0	1	1
Totals (7 entries)		8	8	8	24
