= 2001 Asian Cross Country Championships =

The 6th Asian Cross Country Championships took place 2001 in Kathmandu, Nepal. Team rankings were decided by a combination of each nation's top three athletes finishing positions.

== Medalists ==
Event	Gold	Silver	Bronze
Senior Men Individual	Jafar Babakhani (IRI)	Makoto Otsu (JPN)	Anuradha Indrajith Cooray (SRI)
Senior Men Team	Sri Lanka (SRI)	India (IND)	Iran (IRI)
Junior Men Individual	Tomohiro Uemura (JPN)	Kazuya Masuyama (JPN)	Yuya Shiokawa (JPN)
Junior Men Team	Japan (JPN)	India (IND)	Iran (IRI)
Senior Women Individual	Yasuyo Iwamoto (JPN)	Hisae Yoshimatsu (JPN)	Rika Nakamura (JPN)
Senior Women Team	Japan (JPN)	India (IND)	Sri Lanka (SRI)
Junior Women Individual	Mika Okunaga (JPN)	Rina Fujioka (JPN)	Yasuko Owatari (JPN)
Junior Women Team	Japan (JPN)	India (IND)	Nepal (NEP)

== Medal table ==
Rank	Nation	Gold	Silver	Bronze	Total
1	Japan (JPN)	6	4	3	13
2	Iran (IRI)	1	0	2	3
2	Sri Lanka (SRI)	1	0	2	3
4	India (IND)	0	4	0	4
5	Nepal (NEP)	0	0	1	1
Totals (5 entries)		8	8	8	24
