= Muhammad Sadaqat =

Pakistani sprinter (born 1968)

Personal information
- Nationality: Pakistani
- Born: 2 April 1968 (age 58)

Sport
- Sport: Sprinting
- Events: 400 metres, 4 × 400 metres relay
Medal record
Men's athletics
Representing Pakistan
South Asian Games
Gold medal – first place	1991 Colombo	400m
Gold medal – first place	1991 Colombo	4×400m
Gold medal – first place	1989 Islamabad	400m
Gold medal – first place	1989 Islamabad	4×400m
Gold medal – first place	1987 Calcutta	4×400m
Silver medal – second place	1993 Dhaka	400m
Bronze medal – third place	1995 Madras	400m
Bronze medal – third place	1995 Madras	4×400m
Asian U20 Championships
Silver medal – second place	1988 Singapore	400m

Muhammad Sadaqat (born 2 April 1968) is a Pakistani sprinter. He competed in the men's 4 × 400 metres relay at the 1988 Summer Olympics.

== See also ==
- List of Pakistani records in athletics
- Athletics in Pakistan
- Pakistan at the Olympics
