= 2023 Asian Cross Country Championships =

The 16th Asian Cross Country Championships took place on 7 March 2023 in Kathmandu, Nepal. The venue was Gokarna Forest Resort in Kathmandu.

== Participating Nations ==
- Bangladesh (4)
- Chinese Taipei (3)
- Hong Kong (2)
- India (12)
- Iran (8)
- Japan (2)
- Kazakhstan (1)
- Maldives (3)
- Nepal (20) (Host)
- Pakistan (3)
- Thailand (3)

== Medallists ==
=== Senior ===
10 km

Event	Gold	Silver	Bronze
Men's Individual	Deepak Adhikari (NEP)	Daichi Kamino (JPN)	Mukesh Bahadur Rai (NEP)
Men's Team	Deepak Adhikari; Mukesh Bahadur Rai; Dipak Suhang; Rajan Rokaya (NEP)	Mohammadhossein Tayebi; Morteza Beiranvand; Mansoor Bayat; Seyedamir Zamanpour (IRN)	Hemraj Gurjar; Anand Singh; Nitesh Kumar Rathwa; Balram (IND)
Women's Individual	Yua Sarumida (JPN)	Rajpura Pachhai (NEP)	Sonika (IND)
Women's Team	Sonika; Munni Devi; Chhavi Devi; Sanjivni Devi Jadhav (IND)	Rajpura Pachhai; Pushpa Bhandari; Bindra Shreshtha; Phulmati Rana; Rekha Bishta (NEP)	Linda Janthachit; Natthaya Thanaronnawat; Suneeka Prichaprong (THA)

=== Junior ===
8 km

Event	Gold	Silver	Bronze
Boys' Individual	Samir Eghbalighahyazi (IRN)	Shivaji Madappagoudra (IND)	Pouria Eshaghinezhad (IRN)
Boys' Team	Shivaji Madappagoudra; Subhashis Ghosh; Vijay Savartkar; Divyansh Kumar (IND)	Samir Eghbalighahyazi; Pouria Eshaghinezhad; Martin Shahbazi; Amirhossein Shahsavani (IRN)	Ser Bahadur Adhikari; Sanjay Damai; Bikesh Ghimire; Dipendra Bohora (NEP)

6 km

Event	Gold	Silver	Bronze
Girls' Individual	Srushti Shridhar Redekar (IND)	Ram Maya Budha (NEP)	Beby (IND)
Girls' Team	Srushti Shridhar Redekar; Beby; Priyanka C. Bhumeshwory Devi Huidrom (IND)	Ram Maya Budha; Rajyalakshmi Raval; Bimala Karki; Anju Khadka (NEP)	Not awarded

== Medal table ==
* Host nation (Nepal)

Rank	Nation	Gold	Silver	Bronze	Total
1	India (IND)	4	1	3	8
2	Nepal (NEP)	2	4	2	8
3	Iran (IRI)	1	2	1	4
4	Japan (JPN)	1	1	0	2
5	Thailand (THA)	0	0	1	1
Totals (5 entries)		8	8	7	23

- Bronze medal in 6 km Girls' team was not awarded due to lack of participants
