= 2016 Pan American Cross Country Cup =

- Organisers: Association of Panamerican Athletics; North American, Central American and Caribbean Athletic Association
- Edition: 2nd
- Date: March 4
- Host city: Caraballeda, Venezuela
- Venue: Campo de Golf de Caraballeda
- Events: 4
- Distances: 10 km – Senior men 8 km – Junior men (U20); 8 km – Senior women 6 km – Junior women (U20)
- Participation: 20 countries nations

The 2016 Pan American Cross Country Cup took place on March 4, 2016. in Caraballeda, Venezuela.

The competition incorporated the 2016 NACAC Cross Country Championships and 2016 South American Cross Country Championships.

== Medalists ==
| Event | Gold | Silver | Bronze |
|---|---|---|---|
Individual
| Senior men (10 km) | | | |
| Junior (U20) men (8 km) | | | |
| Senior women (8 km) | | | |
| Junior (U20) women (6 km) | | | |
Team
| Senior men | | | |
| Junior (U20) men | | | |
| Senior women | | | |
| Junior (U20) women | | | |

== Race results ==
=== Senior men's race (10 km) ===
Individual race
| Rank | Athlete | Country | Time |
|---|---|---|---|
| 1st place, gold medalist(s) | | | |
| 2nd place, silver medalist(s) | | | |
| 3rd place, bronze medalist(s) | | | |
| 4 | | | |
| 5 | | | |
| 6 | | | |
| 7 | | | |
| 8 | | | |
| 9 | | | |
| 10 | | | |
| 11 | | | |
| 12 | | | |
| 13 | | | |
| 14 | | | |

Teams
| Rank | Team | Points |
|---|---|---|
| 1st place, gold medalist(s) | | |
| 2nd place, silver medalist(s) | | |
| 3rd place, bronze medalist(s) | | |
| 4 | | |
| 5 | | |
| 6 | | |
| 7 | | |

=== Junior (U20) men's race (8 km) ===
Individual race
| Rank | Athlete | Country | Time |
|---|---|---|---|
| 1st place, gold medalist(s) | | | |
| 2nd place, silver medalist(s) | | | |
| 3rd place, bronze medalist(s) | | | |
| 4 | | | |
| 5 | | | |
| 6 | | | |
| 7 | | | |
| 8 | | | |
| 9 | | | |
| 10 | | | |
| 11 | | | |
| 12 | | | |
| 13 | | | |
| 14 | | | |

Teams
| Rank | Team | Points |
|---|---|---|
| 1st place, gold medalist(s) | | |
| 2nd place, silver medalist(s) | | |
| 3rd place, bronze medalist(s) | | |
| 4 | | |
| 5 | | |
| 6 | | |
| 7 | | |

=== Senior women's race (8 km) ===
Individual race
| Rank | Athlete | Country | Time |
|---|---|---|---|
| 1st place, gold medalist(s) | | | |
| 2nd place, silver medalist(s) | | | |
| 3rd place, bronze medalist(s) | | | |
| 4 | | | |
| 5 | | | |
| 6 | | | |
| 7 | | | |
| 8 | | | |
| 9 | | | |
| 10 | | | |
| 11 | | | |
| 12 | | | |
| 13 | | | |
| 14 | | | |

Teams
| Rank | Team | Points |
|---|---|---|
| 1st place, gold medalist(s) | | |
| 2nd place, silver medalist(s) | | |
| 3rd place, bronze medalist(s) | | |
| 4 | | |
| 5 | | |
| 6 | | |
| 7 | | |

=== Junior (U20) women's race (6 km) ===
Individual race
| Rank | Athlete | Country | Time |
|---|---|---|---|
| 1st place, gold medalist(s) | | | |
| 2nd place, silver medalist(s) | | | |
| 3rd place, bronze medalist(s) | | | |
| 4 | | | |
| 5 | | | |
| 6 | | | |
| 7 | | | |
| 8 | | | |
| 9 | | | |
| 10 | | | |
| 11 | | | |
| 12 | | | |
| 13 | | | |
| 14 | | | |

Teams
| Rank | Team | Points |
|---|---|---|
| 1st place, gold medalist(s) | | |
| 2nd place, silver medalist(s) | | |
| 3rd place, bronze medalist(s) | | |
| 4 | | |
| 5 | | |
| 6 | | |
| 7 | | |

== Medal table (unofficial) ==
* Host nation (Venezuela)

| Rank | Nation | Gold | Silver | Bronze | Total |
|---|---|---|---|---|---|
| 1 | Brazil | 0 | 0 | 0 | 0 |
| 1 | Canada | 0 | 0 | 0 | 0 |
| 1 | Colombia | 0 | 0 | 0 | 0 |
| 1 | Ecuador | 0 | 0 | 0 | 0 |
| 1 | Peru | 0 | 0 | 0 | 0 |
| 1 | United States | 0 | 0 | 0 | 0 |
| 1 | Venezuela* | 0 | 0 | 0 | 0 |
| Totals (7 entries) | | 0 | 0 | 0 | 0 |

- Note: Totals include both individual and team medals, with medals in the team competition counting as one medal.

== Participation ==
According to an unofficial count, athletes from 20 countries participated.

- Argentina (0)
- Bermuda (0)
- Bolivia (0)
- Brazil (0)
- Canada (0)
- Chile (0)
- Colombia (0)
- Costa Rica (0)
- Cuba (0)
- Ecuador (0)
- El Salvador (0)
- Jamaica (0)
- Mexico (0)
- Paraguay (0)
- Peru (0)
- Puerto Rico (0)
- Trinidad and Tobago (0)
- Uruguay (0)
- United States (0)
- U.S. Virgin Islands (0)
- Venezuela (0)

== See also ==
- 2016 in athletics (track and field)
