= 2012 Asian Cross Country Championships =

The 11th Asian Cross Country Championships took place on March 24, 2012, in Qingzhen, China. Team rankings were decided by a combination of each nation's top three athletes finishing positions. The same city went on to hold the 2015 IAAF World Cross Country Championships three years later.

== Medalists ==
Event	Gold	Silver	Bronze
Senior Men Individual	Gebre Alemu Bekele (BHR)	Mootumaa D. Regassa (BHR)	Gelasa Bilisuaa Shuii (BHR)
Senior Men Team	Bahrain (BHR)	Japan (JPN)	Saudi Arabia (KSA)
Junior Men Individual	Baba Shota (JPN)	Yamamoto Yudai (JPN)	Machizawa Taiga (JPN)
Junior Men Team	Japan (JPN)	China (CHN)	Saudi Arabia (KSA)
Senior Women Individual	Habtegebrel S. Eshete (BHR)	Chalchissa Tejitu Daba (BHR)	Regasa Genzeb Shumi (BHR)
Senior Women Team	Bahrain (BHR)	China (CHN)	Japan (JPN)
Junior Women Individual	Uehara Miyuki (JPN)	Yano Shiori (JPN)	Akiyama Momoko (JPN)
Junior Women Team	Japan (JPN)	China (CHN)	—N/a

== Medal table ==
Rank	Nation	Gold	Silver	Bronze	Total
1	Japan (JPN)	4	3	3	10
2	Bahrain (BHR)	4	2	2	8
3	China (CHN)	0	3	0	3
4	Saudi Arabia (KSA)	0	0	2	2
Totals (4 entries)		8	8	7	23
