= Atsumi Yashima =

Japanese runner

Personal information
- Nationality: Japanese
- Born: 八嶋あつみ; 28 June 1975 (age 50)

Sport
- Country: Japan
- Sport: Athletics
- Event(s): 5000 metres Cross country running

Achievements and titles
- National finals: 5000 m Japanese champion (1995)
Medal record
Asian Cross Country Championships
Gold medal – first place	1995 Chiba	Senior race

Atsumi Yashima (Japanese: 八嶋 あつみ; born 28 June 1975) is a Japanese former long-distance runner who competed in track and cross country running.

Yashima received her first international medal at the 1994 World Junior Championships in Athletics, where she placed third in the women's 1500 metres closely behind Anita Weyermann and Marta Domínguez. She entered the senior ranks the following year and led the Japanese team to victory at the 1995 Asian Cross Country Championships, with Yashima and her team mates Michiko Shimizu and Yasuko Kimura sweeping the podium at the event on home turf in Chiba. This performance earned her selection for the 1995 IAAF World Cross Country Championships, where she finished 69th overall.

She won her first national title at the Japan Championships in Athletics in 1995, topping the podium in the 5000 metres with a time of 15:14.77 minutes, which was a Japanese record for the event. Yashima was chosen to represent Japan in the 5000 m at the 1995 World Championships in Athletics, but she failed to maintain her level of performance and was eliminated in the first round after finishing sixth in a slow, tactical heat.

Yashima also represented her country in ekiden road relays, winning on two occasions: she won her leg at the International Chiba Ekiden in 1994 and finished second in her leg of the 1995 Beijing International Women's Ekiden. She did not compete again at a high level after the 1995 season.

== International competitions ==
Representing Japan
Year	Competition	Venue	Position	Event	Result	Notes
1994	World Junior Championships	Lisbon, Portugal	3rd	1500 m	4:15.84	
1995	Asian Cross Country Championships	Chiba, Japan	1st	Senior race	19:24	
1995	Asian Cross Country Championships	Chiba, Japan	1st	Senior team	6 pts	
1995	World Cross Country Championships	Durham, United Kingdom	69th	Senior race	21:55	
1995	World Cross Country Championships	Durham, United Kingdom	4th	Senior team	102 pts	Non-point scoring member
1995	World Championships	Gothenburg, Sweden	23rd	5000 m	15:40.02	6th in heat 1

== National titles ==
- Japan Championships in Athletics
  - 5000 metres: 1995

== See also ==
- List of 5000 metres national champions (women)
