= 1988 Asian Junior Athletics Championships =

2nd Asian Junior Championships
- Dates: 8 – 11 September
- Host city: Singapore
- Level: Junior (under-20)
- Events: 40

The 1988 Asian Junior Athletics Championships was the second edition of the international athletics competition for Asian under-20 athletes, organised by the Asian Athletics Association. It took place from 8–11 September in Singapore. A total of 40 events were contested, 22 for male athletes and 18 for female athletes.

== Medal summary ==
=== Men ===
Event	Gold		Silver		Bronze	
100 metres	Tatsuo Sugimoto (JPN)	10.53	Takayuki Nakamichi (JPN)	10.65	Wu Jianhui (CHN)	10.78
200 metres	Yoshiyuki Okuyama (JPN)	21.03 CR	Chainarong Wangganont (THA)	21.45	Yoshihiro Kato (JPN)	21.70
400 metres	Ibrahim Ismail Muftah (QAT)	46.59 CR	Muhammad Sadaqat (PAK)	47.74	Yang Chung-Fu (TPE)	47.86
800 metres	Yoshikazu Tachi (JPN)	1:48.43 CR	Lin Kuang-Liang (TPE)	1:50.52	Hamid Sajjadi (IRI)	1:51.05
1500 metres	Mohamed Suleiman (QAT)	3:44.00 CR	Hiroshi Fukaya (JPN)	3:46.23	Hamid Sajjadi (IRI)	3:46.77
5000 metres	Han Zongmin (CHN)	14:31.99	Li Gyong-Ho (PRK)	14:41.69	Kazuhito Kumagai (JPN)	14:44.74
10,000 metres	Jun Hiratsuka (JPN)	30:18.74	Oh Jong-Ho (PRK)	30:20.27	Masaki Yamamoto (JPN)	30:37.64
110 metres hurdles	Ziad Al-Khader (KUW)	14.49	Fouad Ghanem (BHR)	14.50	Masamutsu Hiraishi (JPN)	14.68
400 metres hurdles	Atsushi Yamamoto (JPN)	51.40	Shigeru Yamaguchi (JPN)	51.53	Fouad Ghanem (BHR)	51.59
2000 metres steeplechase	Hiroyuki Itabashi (JPN)	5:44.15 CR	Hamid Sajjadi (IRI)	5:44.52	Mohamed Suleiman (QAT)	5:47.25
4×100 m relay	Japan (JPN)	39.99 CR	Chinese Taipei (TPE)	40.49	Thailand (THA)	41.05
4×400 m relay	Japan (JPN)	3:10.71	Malaysia (MAS)	3:12.45	Chinese Taipei (TPE)	3:12.59
10,000 metres walk	Kong Tao (CHN)	44:49.2 CR	Balay Thirukumaran (MAS)	51:40.6	Subramanian Thanigasalam (SIN)	53:03.3
High jump	Park Jae-Hong (KOR)	2.16 m CR	Hiroyuki Sakaida (JPN)	2.16 m	Saleh Zaid Al-Mass (BHR)	2.09 m
Pole vault	Toshiaki Takahashi (JPN)	5.00 m CR	Wu Chien-Kuo (TPE)	4.40 m	Ahmed Hamdan (KUW)	4.20 m
Long jump	Nai Hui-fang (TPE)	7.84 m	Zhou Ming (CHN)	7.68 m	Benny Fernando (SRI)	7.33 m
Triple jump	Nai Hui-fang (TPE)	16.48 m CR	Sun Xiao (CHN)	15.77 m	Saleh Zaid Al-Mass (BHR)	15.18 m
Shot put	Zhang Yan (CHN)	16.12 m	Hussein Ali Al-Sayed (KUW)	15.14 m	Chen Yi-Shu (TPE)	14.67 m
Discus throw	Li Jing (CHN)	50.12 m CR	Kim Yong-Nam (PRK)	46.36 m	Upkar Singh (IND)	45.74 m
Hammer throw	Satoshi Yamamoto (JPN)	55.12 m	Sudhir Singh Kumar (IND)	52.40 m	Adel Al-Qatami (QAT)	51.14 m
Javelin throw	Kimio Morisawa (JPN)	68.40 m	Park Yong-Young (KOR)	65.60 m	Yang Hongtao (CHN)	64.96 m
Decathlon	Takashi Kiyokawa (JPN)	7009 pts CR	Wu Wen-Jih (TPE)	6628 pts	Ju Jun-Shoei (TPE)	6424 pts

=== Women ===
Event	Gold		Silver		Bronze	
100 metres	Qi Hong (CHN)	12.04	Chen Ya-Li (TPE)	12.14	Toshie Kitada (JPN)	12.29
200 metres	Chen Ya-Li (TPE)	24.24 CR	Toshie Kitada (JPN)	24.66	Ooi Juat Khoon (MAS)	24.73
400 metres	Zhao Min (CHN)	54.51 CR	Kutty Saramma (IND)	55.40	Sriprai Chaikaew (THA)	55.51
800 metres	Zhu Xiuying (CHN)	2:10.06	Jeon Yong-Im (KOR)	2:10.17	Huang Chuen-Li (TPE)	2:10.77
1500 metres	Chong Yeong-Wi (KOR)	4:25.09 CR	Choi Ok-Soon (PRK)	4:26.38	Tomoko Nagao (JPN)	4:26.78
3000 metres	Kim Song-Hwa (PRK)	9:46.16 CR	Tomoko Nagao (JPN)	9:46.48	Paek Do-Jong (PRK)	9:47.39
5000 metres	Paek Do-Jong (PRK)	17:05.79	Betty Sarmiyati (INA)	17:13.18	Kim Gwang-Ok (PRK)	17:31.28
100 metres hurdles	Zhang Aimei (CHN)	14.05	Wang Shu-Hua (TPE)	14.10	Chan Sau Ying (HKG)	14.46
400 metres hurdles	Nozomi Higashida (JPN)	60.40	Su Huei-Chun (TPE)	61.19	Hsieh Shio-Yin (TPE)	62.20
4×100 m relay	Chinese Taipei (TPE)	46.15 CR	Japan (JPN)	47.17	Malaysia (MAS)	47.90
4×400 m relay	Chinese Taipei (TPE)	3:44.04 CR	Japan (JPN)	3:44.82	Malaysia (MAS)	3:55.65
5000 metres walk	Fan Xiaoling (CHN)	24:48.4 CR	Chiyoko Terui (JPN)	25:02.8	Kavita Garari (IND)	27:15.1
High jump	Zhang Tong (CHN)	1.82 m CR	Su Chun-Yueh (TPE)	1.82 m	Baek Gyeong-Seok (KOR)	1.69 m
Long jump	Wang Chunfang (CHN)	6.34 m CR	Wang Shu-Hua (TPE)	6.06 m (w)	Chu Je-Wen (TPE)	5.92 m
Shot put	Wang Shujie (CHN)	14.26 m	Huang Chia-Huei (TPE)	12.93 m	Mun Hye-Ran (KOR)	12.92 m
Discus throw	Tian Liping (CHN)	50.98 m CR	Lee Hsieh-Hua (TPE)	45.04 m	Kau Chuen-Mei (TPE)	44.18 m
Javelin throw	Wang Lianyun (CHN)	55.52 m	Shiny Verghese (IND)	50.58 m	Akiko Adachi (JPN)	46.50 m
Heptathlon	Hsu Huei-Ying (TPE)	5364 pts	Ma Chun-Ping (TPE)	5192 pts	Hong Xiao Jing (SIN)	5132 pts

== Medals ==
Rank	Nation	Gold	Silver	Bronze	Total
1	China (CHN)	14	2	2	18
2	Japan (JPN)	13	9	7	29
3	Chinese Taipei (TPE)	6	12	8	26
4	North Korea (PRK)	2	4	2	8
5	South Korea (KOR)	2	2	2	6
6	Qatar (QAT)	2	0	2	4
7	Kuwait (KUW)	1	1	1	3
8	India (IND)	0	3	2	5
9	Malaysia (MAS)	0	2	3	5
10	Bahrain (BHR)	0	1	3	4
11	Iran (IRI)	0	1	2	3
11	Thailand (THA)	0	1	2	3
13	Indonesia (INA)	0	1	0	1
13	Pakistan (PAK)	0	1	0	1
15	Singapore (SIN)	0	0	2	2
16	Hong Kong (HKG)	0	0	1	1
16	Sri Lanka (SRI)	0	0	1	1
Totals (17 entries)		40	40	40	120
