= 1994 World Junior Championships in Athletics – Women's 1500 metres =

The women's 1500 metres event at the 1994 World Junior Championships in Athletics was held in Lisbon, Portugal, at Estádio Universitário de Lisboa on 23 and 24 July.

== Medalists ==
Gold	Anita Weyermann; Switzerland
Silver	Marta Domínguez; Spain
Bronze	Atsumi Yashima; Japan

== Results ==
=== Final ===
24 July

Rank	Name	Nationality	Time	Notes
1st place, gold medalist(s)	Anita Weyermann	Switzerland	4:13.97	
2nd place, silver medalist(s)	Marta Domínguez	Spain	4:14.59	
3rd place, bronze medalist(s)	Atsumi Yashima	Japan	4:15.84	
4	Rose Cheruiyot	Kenya	4:17.12	
5	Kutre Dulecha	Ethiopia	4:17.39	
6	Irina Nedelenko	Ukraine	4:18.47	
7	Lidia Chojecka	Poland	4:18.70	
8	Heather DeGeest	Canada	4:19.07	
9	Christiane Soeder	Germany	4:23.43	
10	Oksana Zhelezniak	Russia	4:25.50	
11	Natalie Harvey	Australia	4:25.90	
12	Yoshiko Ichikawa	Japan	4:28.36	

=== Heats ===
23 July

==== Heat 1 ====
Rank	Name	Nationality	Time	Notes
1	Yoshiko Ichikawa	Japan	4:22.78	Q
2	Irina Nedelenko	Ukraine	4:22.93	Q
3	Heather DeGeest	Canada	4:23.23	Q
4	Oksana Zhelezniak	Russia	4:23.34	Q
5	Verena Karstens	Germany	4:23.70	
6	Helen Kimutai	Kenya	4:23.79	
7	Sarah Jamieson	Australia	4:25.32	
8	Brigitta Tusai	Hungary	4:27.12	
9	Shura Hotesa	Ethiopia	4:33.95	
10	Miesha Marzell	United States	4:33.98	
11	Mercy Kaunda	Malawi	5:11.14	
	Grazyna Penc	Poland	DNF	

==== Heat 2 ====
Rank	Name	Nationality	Time	Notes
1	Kutre Dulecha	Ethiopia	4:15.59	Q
2	Anita Weyermann	Switzerland	4:16.24	Q
3	Marta Domínguez	Spain	4:16.38	Q
4	Rose Cheruiyot	Kenya	4:16.41	Q
5	Atsumi Yashima	Japan	4:16.44	q
6	Lidia Chojecka	Poland	4:19.11	q
7	Christiane Soeder	Germany	4:21.05	q
8	Natalie Harvey	Australia	4:21.52	q
9	Angie Froese	Canada	4:25.98	
10	Miriam Achote	Ecuador	4:47.45	
11	Rachida Mahamane	Niger	5:18.90	

== Participation ==
According to an unofficial count, 23 athletes from 16 countries participated in the event.

- Australia (2)
- Canada (2)
- Ecuador (1)
- Ethiopia (2)
- Germany (2)
- Hungary (1)
- Japan (2)
- Kenya (2)
- Malawi (1)
- Niger (1)
- Poland (2)
- Russia (1)
- Spain (1)
- Switzerland (1)
- Ukraine (1)
- United States (1)
