= 2007 Asian Cross Country Championships =

The 9th Asian Cross Country Championships took place on March 10, 2007, in Amman, Jordan. Team rankings were decided by a combination of each nation's top three athletes finishing positions.

== Medalists ==
Event	Gold	Silver	Bronze
Senior Men Individual	Abdullah Ahmad Hassan (QAT)	Surendra Singh Kumar (IND)	Khaled Kamal Khaled (BHR)
Senior Men Team	Qatar (QAT)	Bahrain (BHR)	None
Junior Men Individual	Kamal Ali Thamer (QAT)	Nasser Jamal Nasser (QAT)	Mujahid Al-Ommal (YEM)
Junior Men Team	Yemen (YEM)	None	None
Senior Women Individual	Maryam Yusuf Jamal (BHR)	Karima Saleh Jassem (BHR)	Nadia Ejjafini (BHR)
Senior Women Team	Bahrain (BHR)	Japan (JPN)	China (CHN)
Junior Women Individual	Monika Raut (IND)	Rohini Raut (IND)	Bara'a Awadallah Marouane (JOR)
Junior Women Team	India (IND)	Jordan (JOR)	Singapore (SIN)

== Medal table ==
Rank	Nation	Gold	Silver	Bronze	Total
1	Qatar (QAT)	3	1	0	4
2	Bahrain (BHR)	2	2	2	6
3	India (IND)	2	2	0	4
4	Yemen (YEM)	1	0	1	2
5	Jordan (JOR)	0	1	1	2
6	Japan (JPN)	0	1	0	1
7	China (CHN)	0	0	1	1
Totals (7 entries)		8	7	5	20
