= 1999 Asian Cross Country Championships =

The 5th Asian Cross Country Championships took place 1999 in Tehran, Iran for Men and in Hong Kong for Women. Team rankings were decided by a combination of each nation's top three athletes finishing positions.

== Medalists ==
Event	Gold	Silver	Bronze
Senior Men Individual	Ahmad Zarekar (IRI)	Toshinari Fujimoto (JPN)	Noriyoshi Takasu (JPN)
Senior Men Team	Japan (JPN)	Iran (IRI)	China (CHN)
Junior Men Individual	Zhong Haibo (CHN)	Hidenori Noguchi (JPN)	Jalal Uddin (PAK)
Junior Men Team	Japan (JPN)	Pakistan (PAK)	Iran (IRI) & India (IND)
Senior Women Individual	Mizuki Noguchi (JPN)	Miwako Yamanaka (JPN)	Li Meihua (CHN)
Senior Women Team	Japan (JPN)	China (CHN)	India (IND)
Junior Women Individual	Kaori Yoshida (JPN)	Ritsuko Tankiku (JPN)	Kang Young-Ran (KOR)
Junior Women Team	Japan (JPN)	China (CHN)	Republic of Korea (KOR)

== Medal table ==
Rank	Nation	Gold	Silver	Bronze	Total
1	Japan (JPN)	6	4	1	11
2	China (CHN)	1	2	2	5
3	Iran (IRI)	1	1	1	3
4	Pakistan (PAK)	0	1	1	2
5	India (IND)	0	0	2	2
5	South Korea (KOR)	0	0	2	2
Totals (6 entries)		8	8	9	25
