= 2016 Asian Cross Country Championships =

The 13th Asian Cross Country Championships took place on February 29, 2016 in Manama, Bahrain.

== Medalists ==
| Event | Gold | Silver | Bronze |
|---|---|---|---|
| Senior Men Individual | Albert Rop (BHR) | Isaac Korir (BHR) | Aweke Ayalew (BHR) |
| Senior Men Team | Bahrain (BHR) | Japan (JPN) | Iran (IRI) |
| Junior Men Individual | Abdi Ali (BHR) | Derara Desalegn (BHR) | Abdi Ibrahim (BHR) |
| Junior Men Team | Bahrain (BHR) | Japan (JPN) | Iran (IRI) |
| Senior Women Individual | Eunice Chumba (BHR) | Ruth Jebet (BHR) | Mimi Belete (BHR) |
| Senior Women Team | Bahrain (BHR) | China (CHN) | None |
| Junior Women Individual | Dalila Abdulkadir (BHR) | Desi Mokonin (BHR) | Yuka Mukai (JPN) |
| Junior Women Team | Bahrain (BHR) | Japan (JPN) | Jordan (JOR) |

== Medal table ==
| Rank | Nation | Gold | Silver | Bronze | Total |
|---|---|---|---|---|---|
| 1 | Bahrain (BHR) | 8 | 4 | 3 | 15 |
| 2 | Japan (JPN) | 0 | 3 | 1 | 4 |
| 3 | China (CHN) | 0 | 1 | 0 | 1 |
| 4 | Iran (IRI) | 0 | 0 | 2 | 2 |
| 5 | Jordan (JOR) | 0 | 0 | 1 | 1 |
| Totals (5 entries) | | 8 | 8 | 7 | 23 |
