= Hamid Sajjadi =

Iranian politician (born 1969)

Seyyed Hamid Sajjadi
- حمید سجادی
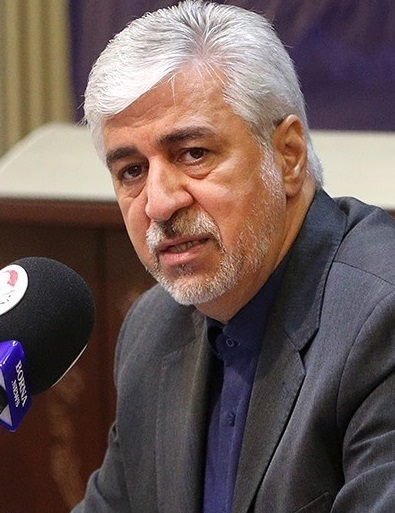
- Sajjadi in 2022

Minister of Sport and Youth
- In office 25 August 2021 – 1 August 2023
- President: Ebrahim Raisi
- Preceded by: Masoud Soltanifar
- Succeeded by: Kioumars Hashemi

Personal details
- Born: Seyed Hamid Sajjadi Hazaveh; 21 March 1969 (age 57) Tehran, Imperial State of Iran
- Sports career
- Country: Iran
- Sport: Men's athletics
- Events: 3000 metres steeplechase, 5000 metres, 10,000 metres

Sports achievements and titles
- Personal bests: 1500 metres: 3:41.66; 3000-m steeplechase: 8:33.89; 5000 metres: 13:53.40; 10,000 metres: 29:22.65
Medal record
Asian Games
Silver medal – second place	1998 Bangkok	3000 m st.
Asian Championships
Gold medal – first place	1991 Kuala Lumpur	3000 m st.
Bronze medal – third place	1993 Manila	3000 m st.
Bronze medal – third place	1995 Jakarta	3000 m st.
Bronze medal – third place	1998 Fukuoka	3000 m st.
Bronze medal – third place	2000 Jakarta	3000 m st.
Asian Cross Country Championships
Gold medal – first place	1993 Jakarta	Senior Men Individual
Asian Junior Championships
Silver medal – second place	1988 Singapore	2000 m st.
Bronze medal – third place	1988 Singapore	1500 m.
Bronze medal – third place	1988 Singapore	800 m.

Hamid Sajjadi Hazaveh (Persian: حمید سجادی هزاوه; born 21 March 1969) was the Minister of Sport and Youths of Iran, from August 25, 2021 to August 1, 2023. He is also an Iranian retired middle distance and long distance runner. He represented Iran at the 1992 Summer Olympics and 1996 Summer Olympics. Sajjadi holds multiple indoor and outdoor national track records for Iran.

== Running career ==
Sajjadi ran the men's 5,000 m race at the 1992 Summer Olympics, although he did not qualify past the preliminaries with a time of 14:04.54 (min:sec). Sajjadi also ran the men's 10,000 metres at the 1996 Summer Olympics, finishing in 29:22.65. Throughout the 1990s, he was a prolific steeplechaser, specializing in the 3000 metres steeplechase in which he finished in first place at the 1991 Asian Athletics Championships.

== Academic and administrative career ==
Sajjadi has a PhD in physiology and is also a lecturer at Azad University. He was at one point nominated by Mahmoud Ahmadinejad to be Iran's sports minister, but he never took up the job. He is currently number two of the Iranian sport organization.

On February 23, 2023, a helicopter that was carrying him and 17 other people crashed while trying to land in Baft. Sajjadi survived the crash, but one of his aides was killed.
