= Mark Ouma =

Kenyan athletics journalist and philosophy academic

Mark Muga Ouma
- Born: 10 September 1960; Kampala, Uganda
- Died: 10 July 2016 (aged 55); Durban, South Africa
- Education: Bachelor's degree in Philosophy
- Alma mater: Makerere University
- Occupations: Athletics journalist, Philosophy academic
- Years active: 1980s–2016
- Known for: Reporting on African athletics
- Notable work: African Athletics website
- Parent(s): Bernadette and Joseph Ouma

Mark Muga Ouma (10 September 1960 – 10 July 2016) was a Ugandan-born Kenyan athletics journalist and philosophy academic.

== Early life ==
Born in Kampala, Uganda, to Bernadette and Joseph Ouma (an academic), Mark Ouma grew up studying in his birthplace, Kenya, and also in Sydney, Australia. He completed a bachelor's degree in philosophy at Makerere University and went on to teach Advanced Logic at his alma mater in the 1980s. A Kenyan citizen, he taught there at Egerton University in the early 1990s.

== Career ==
He chose to focus on his passion, sports journalism, after 1995 and took up a position at the South African Broadcasting Corporation as an international correspondent. He joined the Daybreak Africa News team for Voice of America, remaining in South Africa and serving as the sports editor there. A writer and a photographer, he increasingly focused more on athletics writing, becoming a regular correspondent from 1998 for the International Association of Athletics Federations, the sport's governing body. He became one of Africa's foremost athletics journalists and frequently reported from the African Championships in Athletics – the continent's biennial tournament. Freelancing, Ouma launched African Athletics, a website dedicated to athletics journalism for Africa. While reporting from the 2016 African Championships in Athletics he took ill and died shortly after at King Edward VIII Hospital in Durban. Aleck Skhosana, chairman of Athletics South Africa paid tribute to Ouma's work: "[he] will always be remembered as an advocate of African athletics and a professional in his work. I met Mark all over the world doing what he loved best, promoting African athletics."
