= Zhu Yanmei =

Chinese long-distance runner

Zhu Yanmei (born 16 October 1986 in Yuyang District, Shaanxi) is a female Chinese athletics long-distance runner. She represented her native country at the 3,000 m steeplechase event at the 2008 Summer Olympics. She also ran at the 2007 World Championships in Athletics.

== Personal best ==
- 2008 China Open - 1st 3000m steeplechase
