= Han Gang (athlete) =

Chinese long-distance runner

Han Gang 韓剛
Personal information
- Nationality: Chinese
- Born: 10 November 1978 (age 47)

Sport
- Sport: Long-distance running
- Event: Marathon

Han Gang (born 10 November 1978) is a Chinese long-distance runner. He competed in the men's marathon at the 2004 Summer Olympics.
