= Bermuda at the World Athletics Championships =

- WA code: BER
- National federation: Bermuda Athletic Federation
- Medals: Gold 0 Silver 1 Bronze 0 Total 1

World Athletics Championships appearances (overview)
- 1983; 1987; 1991; 1993; 1995; 1997; 1999; 2001; 2003–2007; 2009; 2011; 2013; 2015; 2017; 2019; 2022; 2023; 2025

Bermuda has competed at the World Athletics Championships on thirteen occasions, and did not send a delegation from 2003 to 2007. Its competing country code is BER. The country has won one silver medal at the competition, through Brian Wellman's performance at the 1995 World Championships in Athletics men's triple jump. Bermudan athletes have placed in the top eight of an event on six occasions.

== Medals by World Championships ==
| medal | Gold | Silver | Bronze | Total |
|---|---|---|---|---|
| 1995 Gothenburg | 0 | 1 | 0 | 1 |
| Totals (1 entries) | 0 | 1 | 0 | 1 |
