= List of Bermudian records in athletics =

The following are the national records in athletics in Bermuda maintained by its national athletics federation: Bermuda National Athletics Association (BNAA).

== Outdoor ==
Key to tables: Awaiting ratification Record not kept by BNAA Not ratified or later rescinded by BNAA

=== Men ===
Event	Record	Athlete	Date	Meet	Place	Ref.
100 m	10.27 (+0.4 m/s)	DeVon Bean	11 May 1996		Glendora, United States	
200 m	20.30 (+1.2 m/s)	Troy Douglas	22 August 1997	Memorial Van Damme	Brussels, Belgium	
400 m	45.26	Troy Douglas	27 July 1996	Olympic Games	Atlanta, United States	
800 m	1:46.26	Aaron Evans	28 May 2010	NCAA East Preliminary Round	Greensboro, United States	
1500 m	3:41.24	Dage Minors	23 July 2022		Manchester, United Kingdom	
Mile	4:01.55	Dage Minors	25 August 2024	The Monument Mile Classic	Stirling, United Kingdom	
3000 m	8:05.88	Lamont Marshall	20 May 2017	Jamaica International Invitational	Kingston, Jamaica	
5000 m	14:23.35	Lamont Marshall	24 March 2017	Raleigh Relays	Raleigh, United States	
10,000 m	30:04.66	Christopher Estwanik	3 July 2015	Island Games	Saint Clement, Jersey	
Half marathon	1:07:16	Christopher Estwanik	28 June 2015	Island Games	Saint Clement, Jersey	
Marathon	2:21:47	Tyler Butterfield	10 March 2019	Lake Biwa Marathon	Ōtsu, Japan	
Marathon	2:19:55	Christopher Estwanik	15 April 2013	Boston Marathon	Boston, United States	
110 m hurdles	14.56 (+1.6 m/s)	Tristan Joynes	13 April 2013		Lake Charles, United States	
400 m hurdles	53.03	Clarence Saunders	24 June 1994		Dedham, United States	
400 m hurdles	52.5 h Mx	Clarence Saunders	1995		Hamilton, Bermuda	
3000 m steeplechase	8:49.71	Lamont Marshall	10 June 2017	Music City Distance Carnival	Nashville, United States	
High jump	2.36 m	Clarence Saunders	1 February 1990	Commonwealth Games	Auckland, New Zealand	
Pole vault	3.86 m	Brooke Onley	15 May 1987		Tuscaloosa, United States	
Long jump	8.34 m (+2.0 m/s)	Tyrone Smith	5 May 2017	Tom Tellez Invitational	Houston, United States	
Triple jump	17.62 m (+0.1 m/s)	Brian Wellman	15 April 1995		El Paso, United States	
Shot put	14.18 m	Charles Trott	22 June 1962		Hamilton, Bermuda	
Discus throw	45.14 m	Dilton Woodley	25 March 1979		Hamilton, Bermuda	
Hammer throw	51.94 m	Gabriel Wilkinson	10 July 2005	Central American and Caribbean Championships	Nassau, The Bahamas	
Javelin throw	62.12 m	Brooke Onley	15 May 1987		Tuscaloosa, United States	
Decathlon	6909 pts	Brooke Onley	15 May 1987		Tuscaloosa, United States	
Decathlon	100m (wind) / Long jump (wind) / Shot put / High jump / 400m / 110m H (wind) / Discus / Pole vault / Javelin / 1500m; 11.24 / 6.41 m / 12.68 m / 1.85 m / 51.30 / 15.77 / 35.68 m / 3.86 m / 62.12 m / 4:42.44					
20 km walk (road)						
50 km walk (road)						
4 × 100 m relay	39.75	Bermuda; Michael Sharpe; Dennis Trott; Calvin Dill; Gregory Simons	27 June 1976	Olympic Games	Montreal, Canada	
4 × 400 m relay	3:11.30	Bermuda; Troy Douglas; Gerald Bean; Williams Trott; Devoe Whaley	16 August 1987	Pan American Games	Indianapolis, United States	
4 × 800 m relay	7:21.87	Bermuda; Shaquille Dill; Aaron Evans; Lamont Marshall; Trey Simons	24 May 2014	IAAF World Relays	Nassau, Bahamas	

=== Women ===
Event	Record	Athlete	Date	Meet	Place	Ref.
100 m	11.46 NWI	Debbie Jones	15 April 1977		Knoxville, United States	
100 m	11.28 NWI (Note: ratified by BNAA but not recognized by World Athletics)	Raneika Bean	1998	CARIFTA Games	Port of Spain, Trinidad and Tobago	
200 m	23.05	Debbie Jones	10 June 1977		Los Angeles, United States	
400 m	51.11	Caitlyn Bobb	17 May 2025	ACC Championships	Winston-Salem, United States	
800 m	2:04.40	Tamika Williams	30 April 2004		Palo Alto, United States	
1500 m	4:10.48	Ashley Couper	21 March 2006	Commonwealth Games	Melbourne, Australia	
3000 m	9:42.25 Mx (Note: by World Athletics source; ratified by BNAA but not recognized by World Athletics)	Ashley Berry	3 June 2015	Watford Open Graded Meeting	Watford, Great Britain	
3000 m	9:48.65 (Note: recognized by World Athletics)	Merernette Bean	12 July 1981		Santo Domingo, Dominican Republic	
5000 m	16:40.31	Ashley Estwanik	15 June 2012		Hamilton, Bermuda	
10,000 m	38:47.61	Ashley Estwanik	15 July 2013	Island Games	Devonshire Parish, Bermuda	
10,000 m	37:44.9 h Mx	Anna Eatherley	4 July 1993		Hamilton, Bermuda	
10 km (road)	34:49	Merernette Bean	November 1982		Ohio, United States	
15 km (road)	55:37+	Ashley Estwanik	20 March 2016	New York City Half Marathon	New York City, United States	
20 km (road)	1:14:11+	Ashley Estwanik	20 March 2016	New York City Half Marathon	New York City, United States	
Half marathon	1:18:19	Ashley Estwanik	20 March 2016	New York City Half Marathon	New York City, United States	
Marathon	2:54:18	Deborah Butterfield	14 January 1990		Hamilton, Bermuda	
100 m hurdles	14.27 A (+0.3 m/s)	Shianne Smith	5 July 2013	CAC Championships	Morelia, Mexico	
400 m hurdles	59.03	Shianne Smith	10 June 2016	Meeting National	Colmar, France	
3000 m steeplechase	10:27.50	Ashley Berry	16 May 2014		Atlanta, United States	
High jump	1.89 m	Sakari Famous	7 August 2026	CAC Games	Santo Domingo, Dominican Republic	
Pole vault						
Long jump	6.50 m (+2.0 m/s)	Arantxa King	31 March 2012		Austin, United States	
Long jump	6.59 m (+0.4 m/s) (Note: was only 5.59 m)	Zindzi Swan	6 April 2007		Gainesville, United States	
Triple jump	13.08 m (+1.4 m/s)	Jasmine Brunson	24 March 2012	UCF Invitational	Orlando, United States	
Shot put	14.30 m	Tiara DeRosa	30 March 2019		Hattiesburg, United States	
Discus throw	48.91 m	Tiara DeRosa	26 April 2018		Philadelphia, United States	
Hammer throw						
Javelin throw	40.39 m	Shianne Smith	18 October 2024		Colomiers, France (Note: by World Athletics source; Colombia by BNAA source, probably a typo)	
Javelin throw	55.98 m (Old design)	Sonia Smith	1984			
Heptathlon	5400 pts	Shianne Smith	1–2 May 2015	Championship of Provence	Aubagne, France	
Heptathlon	100m H (wind) / High jump / Shot put / 200m (wind) / Long jump (wind) / Javelin / 800m; 14.42 (+0.5 m/s) / 1.54 m / 11.12 m / 24.94 (+1.2 m/s) / 5.81 m (+1.6 m/s) / 37.89 m / 2:14.50					
20 km walk (road)						
50 km walk (road)						
4 × 100 m relay	45.6 h	Bermuda; A. Trott; B. Wilson; D. Burgess; Debbie Jones	23 April 1976	Penn Relays	Philadelphia, United States	
4 × 400 m relay	3:47.5 h	Bermuda; B. Wilson; Donna Bean; V. Richards; Debbie Jones	24 April 1976	Penn Relays	Philadelphia, United States	

== Indoor ==
=== Men ===
Event	Record	Athlete	Date	Meet	Place	Ref.
60 m	6.69	William Trott	6 March 1987	World Championships	Indianapolis, United States	
200 m	20.77	Troy Douglas	7 March 1997	World Championships	Paris, France	
400 m	47.15	Troy Douglas	8 March 1994		Stockholm, Sweden	
400 m	46.23 A OT	Troy Douglas	22 February 1992		Flagstaff, United States	
600 m	1:21.35	Dage Minors	December 2015	Smith Winter Classic	Northampton, United States	
800 m	1:47.98	Dage Minors	9 February 2018	BU David Hemery Valentine Invitational	Boston, United States	
800 m	1:47.88 OT	Aaron Evans	11 February 2012	UW Husky Classic	Seattle, United States	
1000 m	2:24.37	Dage Minors	January 2015	Terrier Classic	Boston, United States	
1500 m	3:46.75 (Note: ratified by federation but not recognised by IAAF)	Terrance Armstrong	1998			
Mile	4:03.24 (Note: ratified by federation but not recognised by IAAF)	Terrance Armstrong	1998			
3000 m	8:08.69	LaMont Marshall	11 February 2017	BU David Hemery Valentine Invitational	Boston, United States	
5000 m	14:16.67	LaMont Marshall	26 January 2019	Terrier Classic	Boston, United States	
60 m hurdles	8.53 m (Note: record set during heptathlon competition)	Grant Rivers	22 February 2019	ACC Championships	Blacksburg, United States	
High jump	2.35 m # (Note: not ratified by federation but recognised by IAAF)	Clarence Saunders	13 January 1989		Hamilton, Bermuda	
High jump	2.25 m	Jah-Nhai Perinchief	23 February 2019	Big 12 Championships	Lubbock, United States	
Pole vault	4.40 m	Grant Rivers	16 February 2019	Virginia Tech Elite	Blacksburg, United States	
Pole vault	4.40 m (Note: record set during heptathlon competition)	Grant Rivers	21–22 February 2019	ACC Championships	Blacksburg, United States	
Long jump	7.83 m	Tyrone Smith	18 February 2017	Birmingham Indoor Grand Prix	Birmingham, United Kingdom	
Triple jump	17.72 m (Note: outdoor mark ratified as absolute record)	Brian Wellman	12 March 1995	World Championships	Barcelona, Spain	
Shot put	12.45 m (Note: record set during heptathlon competition)	Grant Rivers	21 February 2019	ACC Championships	Blacksburg, United States	
Heptathlon	5177 pts	Grant Rivers	21–22 February 2019	ACC Championships	Blacksburg, United States	
Heptathlon	60m / Long jump / Shot put / High jump / 60m H / Pole vault / 1000m; 7.44 / 6.64 m / 12.45 m / 1.99 m / 8.53 / 4.40 m / 2:56.01					
5000 m walk						
4 × 100 m relay						

=== Women ===
Event	Record	Athlete	Date	Meet	Place	Ref.
60 m	7.51 A	Keesha Miller	7 December 2017	BYU December Invite	Provo, United States	
200 m	24.23	Debbie Jones	29 February 1980		New York City, United States	
300 m	38.93	Caitlyn Bobb	17 February 2020	MPSSAA 2A State Championships	Landover, United States	
400 m	52.69	Caitlyn Bobb	3 March 2025 (Note: by World Athletics source; February 2022 by BNAA source, a typo)	ACC Championships	Louisville, United States	
500 m	1:10.54	Caitlyn Bobb	8 February 2025	Doc Hale Invitational	Blacksburg, United States	
600 m	1:36.97	Taylor Ashley-Bean	December 2014	CNU Holiday Open	Newport News, United States	
800 m	2:06.29	Tamika Williams	14 February 2004		New York, United States	
800 m	2:05.08 OT	Tamika Williams	15 February 2003		Seattle, United States	
1000 m	3:01.94	Taylor Ashley-Bean	February 2014	Patriot Games	Fairfax, United States	
1500 m	4:21.53	Ashley Couper	13 February 2004		New York City, United States	
Mile	4:35.91	Ashley Couper	February 2006	Tyson Invitational	Fayetteville, United States	
3000 m	9:52.94	Ashley Berry	January 2014	UNC Challenge	Chapel Hill, United States	
3000 m	9:52.20 (Note: recognized by IAAF but not ratified by federation)	Ashley Berry	22 February 2015		Sheffield, United Kingdom	
5000 m	17:11.08	Ashley Berry	28 February 2014	ACC Championships	Clemson, United States	
60 m hurdles	8.96	Shianne Smith	29 January 2010		Seattle, United States	
High jump	1.77 m	Sakari Famous	11 January 2019	UAB Blazer Invitational	Birmingham, United States	
Pole vault						
Long jump	6.42 m	Arantxa King	29 February 2008		Seattle, United States	
Long jump	6.42 m	Arantxa King	27 January 2012	Razorback Invitational	Fayetteville, United States	
Triple jump	13.19 m	Jasmine Brunson	25 February 2012	ACC Championships	Boston, United States	
Shot put	14.72 m	Branwen Smith	11 March 1978		Princeton, United States	
Pentathlon	3613 pts	Shianne Smith	3 February 2019	French Championships	Rennes, France	
Pentathlon	60m H / High jump / Shot put / Long jump / 800m; 9.06 / 1.52 m / 11.27 m / 5.38 m / 2:22.00					
3000 m walk						
4 × 100 m relay						
