= Bermuda at the 2025 World Athletics Championships =

- Flag of Bermuda
- WA code: BER

in Tokyo, Japan 13 September 2025 – 21 September 2025
- Competitors: 1 (0 men and 1 woman)
- Medals: Gold 0 Silver 0 Bronze 0 Total 0

World Athletics Championships appearances (overview)
- 1983; 1987; 1991; 1993; 1995; 1997; 1999; 2001; 2003–2007; 2009; 2011; 2013; 2015; 2017; 2019; 2022; 2023; 2025

Bermuda competed at the 2025 World Athletics Championships in Tokyo, Japan, which were held from 13 to 21 September 2025. The athlete delegation of the territory consisted of one athlete, sprinter Caitlyn Bobb. Triple jumper Jah-Nhai Perinchief was also selected to compete but dropped out after he had suffered from an injury. Bobb competed in the women's 400 metres and failed to make it past the heats.

== Background ==
The 2025 World Athletics Championships in Tokyo, Japan, were held from 19 to 27 August 2023. The Championships were held at the Japan National Stadium. To qualify for the World Championships, athletes had to reach an entry standard (e.g. time or distance), place in a specific position at select competitions, be a wild card entry, or qualify through their World Athletics Ranking at the end of the qualification period.

The athlete delegation of Bermuda consisted of one athlete, sprinter Caitlyn Bobb. Bobb qualified through her world ranking of 63rd in the world after the top three of each directly qualified nation was selected, with spots available for the next highest ranking athletes. Prior to the World Championships, she had a personal best in the women's 400 metres at 51.11 seconds, which was near the qualifying standard of 50.95 seconds. Triple jumper Jah-Nhai Perinchief was also selected to compete for the team but dropped out after he had suffered from an injury. Bobb would be the first female Bermudian athlete to represent the team at the World Athletics Championships since long jumper Arantxa King competed in 2013.

== Results ==
Key

- Q = Qualified for the next round
- q = Qualified for the next round as a fastest loser or, in field events, by position without achieving the qualifying target
- NR = National record
- PB = Personal best
- SB = Season best
- N/A = Round not applicable for the event

=== Women ===
Bobb competed in the qualifying heats of the women's 400 metres on 14 September 2025 in the third heat against eight other competitors. There, she recorded a time of 51.72 seconds and placed fifth, failing to advance to the semifinals as the top three of each heat and the next six fastest athletes would only be able to do so.

Track and road events

Athlete	Event	Heat		Semifinal		Final	
Athlete	Event	Result	Rank	Result	Rank	Result	Rank
Caitlyn Bobb	400 metres	51.72	5	Did not advance			
