= Bermuda at the 2022 World Athletics Championships =

- Flag of Bermuda
- WA code: BER

in Eugene, United States 15 July 2022 – 24 July 2022
- Competitors: 1 (1 man)
- Medals: Gold 0 Silver 0 Bronze 0 Total 0

World Athletics Championships appearances (overview)
- 1983; 1987; 1991; 1993; 1995; 1997; 1999; 2001; 2003–2007; 2009; 2011; 2013; 2015; 2017; 2019; 2022; 2023; 2025

Bermuda competed at the 2022 World Athletics Championships in Eugene, Oregon, United States, which were held from 15 to 24 July 2022. The athlete delegation of the country was composed of one competitor, triple jumper Jah-Nhai Perinchief. During the qualifiers of the men's triple jump, Perinchief placed 22nd and failed to advance to the finals.

== Background ==
The 2022 World Athletics Championships in Eugene, Oregon, United States, were held from 15 to 24 July 2022. To qualify for the World Championships, athletes had to reach an entry standard (e.g. time and distance), place in a specific position at select competitions, be a wild card entry, or qualify through their World Athletics Ranking at the end of the qualification period.

As the Bermuda did not meet any of the four standards, they could send either one male or one female athlete in one event of the Championships who has not yet qualified. The Bermuda National Athletics Association selected triple jumper Jah-Nhai Perinchief. Prior to the Championships, Perinchief was the 2021 Bermuda Male Athlete of the Year. Former triple jumper Brian Wellman commented that he was hopeful about Perinchief's performance at the World Championships.

== Results ==
Key

- Q = Qualified for the next round
- q = Qualified for the next round as a fastest loser or, in field events, by position without achieving the qualifying target
- NR = National record
- PB = Personal best
- SB = Season best
- N/A = Round not applicable for the event

=== Men ===
Perinchief competed in the qualifiers of the event on 21 July 2022 in Group B. His first attempt marked 16.38 metres, his second failed to register a mark, and his third marked 16.26 metres. With his highest distance of 16.38 metres, he placed 22nd and failed to advance to the finals as he was outside of the top 12 best performers.

Field events

| Athlete | Event | Qualification | | Final | |
| Athlete | Event | Distance | Position | Distance | Position |
|---|---|---|---|---|---|
| Jah-Nhai Perinchief | Triple jump | 16.38 (+0.8) | 22 | did not advance | |
