= Athletics at the 2002 Commonwealth Games – Women's 1500 metres =

Women's 1500 metres at the Commonwealth Games

The women's 1500 metres event at the 2002 Commonwealth Games was held on 30–31 July.

== Medalists ==
Gold	Silver	Bronze
Kelly Holmes; England	Hayley Tullett; Wales	Helen Pattinson; England

== Results ==
=== Heats ===
Qualification: First 4 of each heat (Q) and the next 4 fastest (q) qualified for the final.

Rank	Heat	Name	Nationality	Time	Notes
1	2	Kelly Holmes	England	4:11.27	Q
2	2	Naomi Mugo	Kenya	4:12.60	Q, SB
3	2	Sarah Jamieson	Australia	4:12.63	Q
4	2	Mardrea Hyman	Jamaica	4:12.75	Q
5	2	Diane Cummins	Canada	4:12.96	q
6	2	Rachel Newcombe	Wales	4:15.18	q
7	2	Hayley Ovens	Scotland	4:15.39	q
8	1	Jackline Maranga	Kenya	4:17.23	Q
9	1	Hayley Tullett	Wales	4:17.36	Q
10	1	Helen Pattinson	England	4:17.39	Q
11	1	Kerry Gillibrand	England	4:18.29	Q
12	2	Kelly McNeice	Northern Ireland	4:18.45	q, PB
13	1	Anna Ndege	Tanzania	4:20.88	
14	1	Natalie Lewis	Wales	4:23.45	
15	1	Benita Johnson	Australia	4:24.43	
16	1	Grace Ebor	Nigeria	4:29.16	
17	2	Addeh Mwamba	Zambia	4:35.76	
	1	Susan Scott	Scotland	DNS	
	1	Maria Mutola	Mozambique	DNS	
	2	Lwiza John	Tanzania	DNS	

=== Final ===
Rank	Name	Nationality	Time	Notes
1st place, gold medalist(s)	Kelly Holmes	England	4:05.99	
2nd place, silver medalist(s)	Hayley Tullett	Wales	4:07.52	SB
3rd place, bronze medalist(s)	Helen Pattinson	England	4:07.62	
4	Jackline Maranga	Kenya	4:08.47	SB
5	Sarah Jamieson	Australia	4:09.38	
6	Mardrea Hyman	Jamaica	4:10.47	SB
7	Naomi Mugo	Kenya	4:11.47	SB
8	Rachel Newcombe	Wales	4:13.56	
9	Diane Cummins	Canada	4:14.83	
10	Kerry Gillibrand	England	4:15.54	
11	Kelly McNeice	Northern Ireland	4:16.46	PB
12	Hayley Ovens	Scotland	4:16.95	
