= Bermuda at the 2023 World Athletics Championships =

- Flag of Bermuda
- WA code: BER

in Budapest, Hungary 19 August 2023 – 27 August 2023
- Competitors: 1 (1 man and 0 women)
- Medals: Gold 0 Silver 0 Bronze 0 Total 0

World Athletics Championships appearances (overview)
- 1983; 1987; 1991; 1993; 1995; 1997; 1999; 2001; 2003–2007; 2009; 2011; 2013; 2015; 2017; 2019; 2022; 2023; 2025

Bermuda competed at the 2023 World Athletics Championships in Budapest, Hungary, which were held from 19 to 27 August 2023. The athlete delegation of the country was composed of one competitor, Jah-Nhai Perinchief who would compete in the men's triple jump. He qualified for the Championships after he ranked 23rd in the World Athletics Rankings. In the qualification round of the event, he failed to record a mark and subsequently did not qualify for the finals.

== Background ==
The 2023 World Athletics Championships in Budapest, Hungary, were held from 19 to 27 August 2023. The Championships were held at the National Athletics Centre. To qualify for the World Championships, athletes had to reach an entry standard (e.g. time or distance), place in a specific position at select competitions, be a wild card entry, or qualify through their World Athletics Ranking at the end of the qualification period.

Triple jumper Jah-Nhai Perinchief would be the sole representative for the nation at the championships. He qualified after he ranked 23rd in the World Athletics Rankings for the men's triple jump. In the lead-up to the Championships, he was hoping for his teammate middle-distance runner Dage Minors to qualify. Previously, Perinchief had competed for Bermuda at the 2022 World Athletics Championships.

== Results ==
Key

- Q = Qualified for the next round
- q = Qualified for the next round as a fastest loser or, in field events, by position without achieving the qualifying target
- NR = National record
- PB = Personal best
- SB = Season best
- N/A = Round not applicable for the event

=== Men ===
Perinchief competed in the qualification round of the event on 19 August in Group A against 20 other athletes. There, he would fail to record a mark on his first attempt before retiring from the competition, thus not qualifying for the finals.

Field events

Athlete	Event	Qualification		Final	
Athlete	Event	Distance	Position	Distance	Position
Jah-Nhai Perinchief	Triple jump	NM		Did not advance	
