= Bermuda at the 2019 World Athletics Championships =

- WA code: BER

in Doha, Qatar
- Competitors: 1
- Medals: Gold 0 Silver 0 Bronze 0 Total 0

World Athletics Championships appearances (overview)
- 1983; 1987; 1991; 1993; 1995; 1997; 1999; 2001; 2003–2007; 2009; 2011; 2013; 2015; 2017; 2019; 2022; 2023; 2025

Bermuda competed at the 2019 World Athletics Championships in Doha, Qatar, which were held from 27 September to 6 October 2019. The athlete delegation of the country was composed of one competitor, long jumper Tyrone Smith who was selected by the Bermuda National Athletics Association. He competed in the qualification round of the Long jump and placed 25th overall. Thus, he failed to qualify for the finals.

== Background ==
The 2019 World Athletics Championships in Doha, Qatar, were held from 27 September to 6 October 2019. The Championships were held at the Khalifa International Stadium. To qualify for the World Championships, athletes had to reach an entry standard (e.g. time or distance), place in a specific position at select competitions, be a wild card entry, or qualify through their World Athletics Ranking at the end of the qualification period.

As Bermuda did not meet any of the four standards, they could send either one male or one female athlete in one event of the Championships who has not yet qualified. The Bermuda National Athletics Association selected long jumper Tyrone Smith. In the lead-up to the Championships, Smith held a personal best of 8.34 metres and a season's best of 7.96 metres in the event.

== Results ==
=== Men ===
Smith competed in the qualifiers of the men's long jump on 27 September 2019. He competed in Group B in the qualification round against 13 other long jumpers. He recorded a distance of 7.45 metres for his first attempt, 7.40 metres for his second attempt, and his longest of 7.49 metres for his third attempt. With his third attempt mark, he placed 25th out of the 26 long jumpers in the qualifiers that recorded a mark. He failed to qualify for the finals as only the athletes attaining a mark of at least 8.15 metres or at least the 12 best performers would be able to do so.

Field events

| Athlete | Event | Qualification | | Final | |
| Athlete | Event | Result | Rank | Result | Rank |
|---|---|---|---|---|---|
| Tyrone Smith | Long jump | 7.49 | 25 | did not advance | |
