= Athletics at the 2003 All-Africa Games – Women's 1500 metres =

The women's 1500 metres at the 2003 All-Africa Games were held on October 13.

== Results ==
Rank	Name	Nationality	Time	Notes
1st place, gold medalist(s)	Kutre Dulecha	Ethiopia	4:21.63	
2nd place, silver medalist(s)	Jackline Maranga	Kenya	4:22.69	
3rd place, bronze medalist(s)	Naomi Mugo	Kenya	4:24.33	
4	Berhane Herpassa	Ethiopia	4:24.84	
5	Mestawot Tadesse	Ethiopia	4:26.52	
6	Rosa Albana Saúl	Angola	4:32.04	
7	Simret Sultan	Eritrea	4:32.43	
8	Euridice Borges Semedo	São Tomé and Príncipe	4:34.46	
9	Lamberte Nyabamikazi	Rwanda	4:34.68	
10	Mashair Ali	Sudan	4:35.37	
	Nahida Touhami	Algeria	DNS	
	Aicha Syvane	Guinea	DNS	
