= Athletics at the 2006 Commonwealth Games – Women's 1500 metres =

Women's 1500 metres at the Commonwealth Games

The women's 1500 metres event at the 2006 Commonwealth Games was held on March 20–21.

== Medalists ==
Gold	Silver	Bronze
Lisa Dobriskey; England	Sarah Jamieson; Australia	Hayley Tullett; Wales

== Results ==
=== Heats ===
Qualification: First 4 of each heat (Q) and the next 4 fastest (q) qualified for the final.

Rank	Heat	Name	Nationality	Time	Notes
1	1	Hayley Tullett	Wales	4:09.59	Q, SB
2	1	Carmen Hussar	Canada	4:09.98	Q
3	1	Lisa Dobriskey	England	4:10.02	Q
4	1	Suzanne Walsham	Australia	4:10.38	Q
5	1	Hayley Ovens	Scotland	4:10.52	q, SB
6	1	Ashley Couper	Bermuda	4:11.03	q, PB
7	2	Helen Clitheroe	England	4:11.05	Q
8	2	Lisa Corrigan	Australia	4:11.21	Q
9	2	Hilary Stellingwerff	Canada	4:11.75	Q
10	2	Sarah Jamieson	Australia	4:11.85	Q
11	1	Viola Kibiwot	Kenya	4:12.33	q, SB
12	2	Malindi Elmore	Canada	4:12.51	q, SB
13	2	Natalie Lewis	Wales	4:15.22	
14	2	Orchatteri Jaisha	India	4:15.58	
15	2	Lebogang Phalula	South Africa	4:18.31	PB
16	1	Morag MacLarty	Scotland	4:20.79	
17	1	Dina Phalula	South Africa	4:29.28	
	2	Marlene Breytenbach	South Africa	DNF	

=== Final ===
Rank	Name	Nationality	Time	Notes
1st place, gold medalist(s)	Lisa Dobriskey	England	4:06.21	
2nd place, silver medalist(s)	Sarah Jamieson	Australia	4:06.64	
3rd place, bronze medalist(s)	Hayley Tullett	Wales	4:06.76	SB
4	Helen Clitheroe	England	4:06.81	
5	Carmen Hussar	Canada	4:07.48	
6	Suzanne Walsham	Australia	4:08.42	SB
7	Viola Kibiwot	Kenya	4:08.74	SB
8	Malindi Elmore	Canada	4:09.06	SB
9	Ashley Couper	Bermuda	4:10.48	NR
10	Hayley Ovens	Scotland	4:10.75	
11	Hilary Stellingwerff	Canada	4:11.48	
12	Lisa Corrigan	Australia	4:15.05	
