= Hilary Stellingwerff =

Canadian middle-distance runner

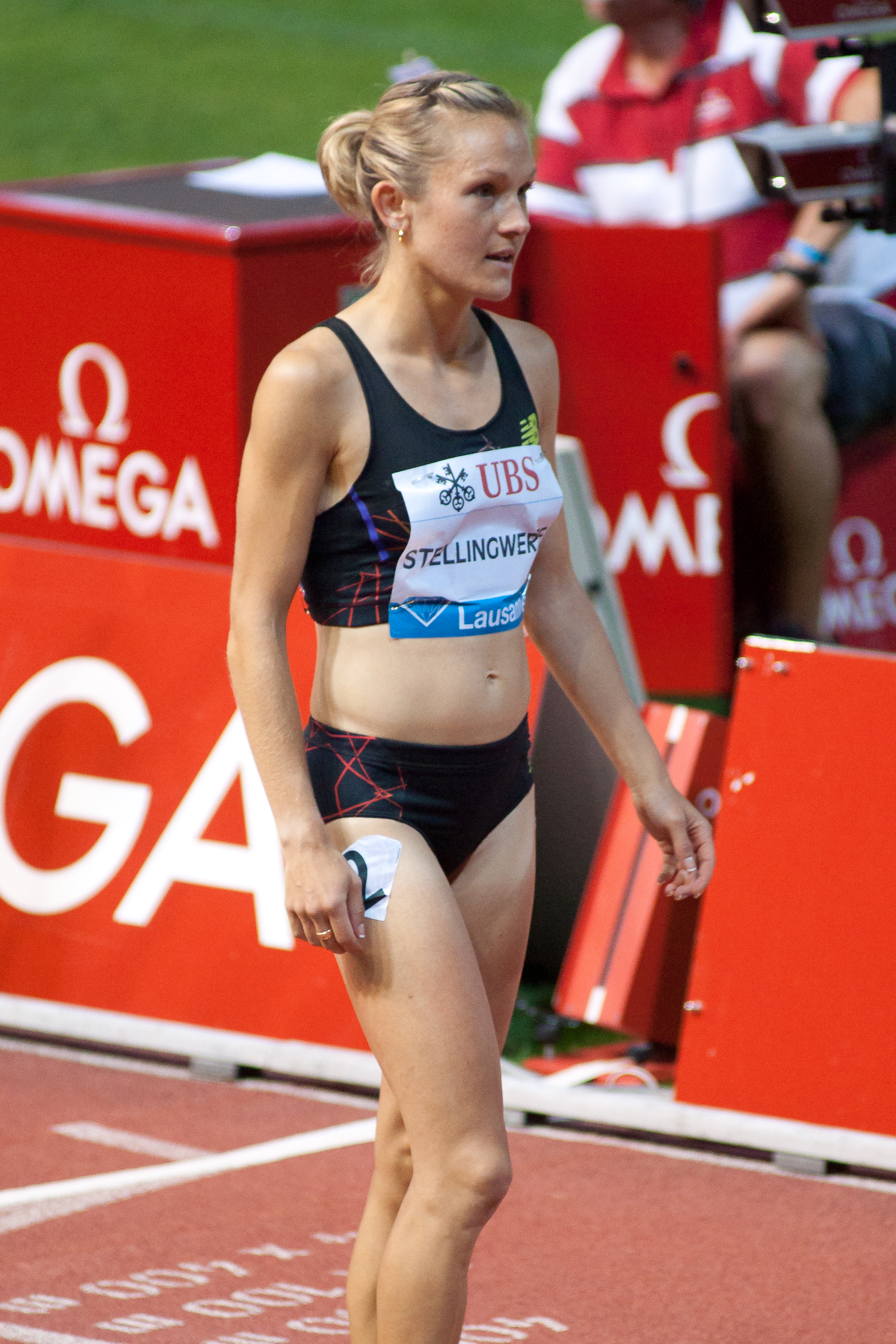
Hilary Stellingwerff in 2012

Hilary Stellingwerff (née Edmondson; born August 7, 1981 in Sarnia) is a Canadian track and field middle-distance runner. She competed in the 1500m event at the 2012 Summer Olympics, reaching the semifinals. She personal best for the 1500 metres is 4:05.08 minutes, set in 2012.

Stellingwerff was an All-American runner for the Wisconsin Badgers track and field team, finishing 4th in the mile run at the 2004 NCAA Division I Indoor Track and Field Championships.

She was runner-up at the Canadian Track and Field Championships in 2012, where she achieved the Olympic qualifying standard.

In July 2016 she was officially named to Canada's Olympic team.

== International competitions ==
Year	Competition	Venue	Position	Event	Notes
2005	World Cross Country Championships	Saint-Galmier, France	59th	Short race	14:44
2005	Universiade	İzmir, Turkey	7th	1500 m	4:16.78
2006	Commonwealth Games	Melbourne, Australia	11th	1500 m	4:11.48
2007	World Championships	Osaka, Japan	16th (h)	1500 m	4:15.99
2008	World Indoor Championships	Valencia, Spain	18th (h)	1500 m	4:18.26
2010	Commonwealth Games	New Delhi, India	11th	1500 m	4:12.87
2012	Olympic Games	London, United Kingdom	14th (sf)	1500 m	4:05.57
2016	Olympic Games	Rio de Janeiro, Brazil	31st (h)	1500 m	4:12.00
