= Séverine Foulon =

French middle-distance runner (1973–2024)

Personal information
- Nationality: French
- Born: 8 December 1973 Lille, France
- Died: 29 January 2024 (aged 50)
- Years active: 1990–2000
- Height: 1.70 m (5 ft 7 in)
- Weight: 55 kg (121 lb)

Sport
- Event(s): Middle distance running: 800 m, 1 500 m, Cross-country
- Club: AL Auxi-le-Château, Touquet AC, RC ARRAS
- Coached by: Jacques Dannely, José Marajo

Séverine Foulon (8 December 1973 – 29 January 2024) was a French athlete, who specialised in the middle distances. She made 21 appearances for France Athletics – 8 youth and 13 international.

== Career ==
In age-specific competitions, Foulon won the gold medal at the 1990 Gymnasiade and the bronze medal at the 1991 European Junior Championships in Thessaloniki. She also competed at the 1990 World Junior Championships without reaching the final, was disqualified from the final race at the 1992 World Junior Championships and competed in the junior race at the 1992 World Cross Country Championships.

In 1990, she set a French junior record in the 800m with 2:05.00 minutes, achieved in Dôle. She set another French junior record in the 1500m indoor with 4:28.03 in Liévin in 1992.

She won the silver medal at the Jeux de la Francophonie and the bronze medal at 1997 Mediterranean Games. She finished sixth at the 1997 European Cup Super League meet and competed at the 1997 World Indoor Championships without reaching the final.

Domestically, Foulon won the French national 800 meters title during the 1995 French Championships at Charléty Stadium in Paris. Her personal best time in the 800 metres was 2:01.41 minutes, achieved in July 1997 in Hechtel. In the 1500 metres she ran in 4:17.36 minutes in May 1997 in Koblenz.

== Death ==
Foulon died on 29 January 2024, at the age of 50.
