= 1996 World Junior Championships in Athletics – Women's 1500 metres =

The women's 1500 metres event at the 1996 World Junior Championships in Athletics was held in Sydney, Australia, at International Athletic Centre on 23 and 25 August. The first of these championships was won by anna lopaciuch

== Medalists ==
Gold	Kutre Dulecha; Ethiopia
Silver	Jackline Maranga; Kenya
Bronze	Shura Hotesa; Ethiopia

== Results ==
=== Final ===
25 August

Rank	Name	Nationality	Time	Notes
1st place, gold medalist(s)	Kutre Dulecha	Ethiopia	4:08.65	
2nd place, silver medalist(s)	Jackline Maranga	Kenya	4:08.98	
3rd place, bronze medalist(s)	Shura Hotesa	Ethiopia	4:09.49	
4	Rose Kosgei	Kenya	4:10.64	
5	Lidia Chojecka	Poland	4:11.36	
6	Brigitta Tusai	Hungary	4:13.59	
7	Anita Weyermann	Switzerland	4:13.67	
8	Lavinia Miroiu	Romania	4:14.68	
9	Rocío Rodríguez	Spain	4:17.46	
10	Claudia Colita	Romania	4:18.65	
11	Bouchra Benthami	Morocco	4:18.82	
12	Svetlana Berdysheva	Russia	4:22.61	

=== Heats ===
23 August

==== Heat 1 ====
Rank	Name	Nationality	Time	Notes
1	Jackline Maranga	Kenya	4:20.17	Q
2	Shura Hotesa	Ethiopia	4:20.20	Q
3	Lidia Chojecka	Poland	4:20.46	Q
4	Anita Weyermann	Switzerland	4:20.76	Q
5	Claudia Colita	Romania	4:21.63	q
6	Zhang Jinqing	China	4:24.31	
7	Vanessa Galán	Spain	4:25.06	
8	Sonja Roman	Slovenia	4:26.14	
9	Kristine Jost	United States	4:26.78	
10	Tania Fransissi	Luxembourg	4:28.44	
11	Jane Morapedi	Botswana	4:58.74	
	Heather DeGeest	Canada	DNF	

==== Heat 2 ====
Rank	Name	Nationality	Time	Notes
1	Kutre Dulecha	Ethiopia	4:17.94	Q
2	Rose Kosgei	Kenya	4:18.29	Q
3	Lavinia Miroiu	Romania	4:18.83	Q
4	Brigitta Tusai	Hungary	4:19.04	Q
5	Svetlana Berdysheva	Russia	4:19.05	q
6	Bouchra Benthami	Morocco	4:19.93	q
7	Rocío Rodríguez	Spain	4:20.28	q
8	Anna Lopaciuch	Poland	4:27.27	
9	Jessica Totaro	United States	4:28.77	
10	Aurélie Roux	France	4:29.56	
11	Nao Takenaka	Japan	4:29.79	
12	Veronique Bingouma	Gabon	5:06.55	

== Participation ==
According to an unofficial count, 24 athletes from 18 countries participated in the event.

- Botswana (1)
- Canada (1)
- China (1)
- Ethiopia (2)
- France (1)
- Gabon (1)
- Hungary (1)
- Japan (1)
- Kenya (2)
- Luxembourg (1)
- Morocco (1)
- Poland (2)
- Romania (2)
- Russia (1)
- Slovenia (1)
- Spain (2)
- Switzerland (1)
- United States (2)
