= Bermuda at the 2011 World Championships in Athletics =

- WA code: BER
- National federation: Bermuda Track & Field Association

in Daegu
- Competitors: 1
- Medals: Gold 0 Silver 0 Bronze 0 Total 0

World Championships in Athletics appearances
- 1983; 1987; 1991; 1993; 1995; 1997; 1999; 2001; 2003–2007; 2009; 2011; 2013; 2015; 2017; 2019; 2022; 2023; 2025

Bermuda competed at the 2011 World Championships in Athletics from August 27 to September 4 in Daegu, South Korea. One athlete, long jumper Tyrone Smith, was announced to represent the country in the event.

== Results ==
=== Men ===
Athlete	Event	Preliminaries		Heats		Semifinals		Final	
Athlete	Event	Time Width Height	Rank	Time Width Height	Rank	Time Width Height	Rank	Time Width Height	Rank
Tyrone Smith	Long jump	7.91	19					Did not advance	
