= Bermuda at the 2017 World Championships in Athletics =

- Flag of Bermuda
- WA code: BER
- National federation: Bermuda National Athletics Association
- Website: athleticsbda.com

in London, United Kingdom 4–13 August 2017
- Competitors: 1 (1 man) in 1 event
- Medals: Gold 0 Silver 0 Bronze 0 Total 0

World Championships in Athletics appearances
- 1983; 1987; 1991; 1993; 1995; 1997; 1999; 2001; 2003–2007; 2009; 2011; 2013; 2015; 2017; 2019; 2022; 2023; 2025

Bermuda competed at the 2017 World Championships in Athletics in London, United Kingdom, 4–13 August 2017.

== Results ==
=== Men ===
Field events

Athlete	Event	Qualification		Final	
Athlete	Event	Distance	Position	Distance	Position
Tyrone Smith	Long jump	7.88	13	Did not advance	
