= Jackline Maranga =

Kenyan middle-distance runner

Medal record

Women's athletics

Representing Kenya

African Championships
Gold medal – first place	1998 Dakar	1500 m
Gold medal – first place	2002 Radès	1500 m

Jackline Maranga (born 16 December 1977 in Nyanturago) is a Kenyan retired middle-distance runner. She won a silver medal at the World Junior Championships at the age of 15, and also won silver medals in the two following Championships, being the only athlete to do so.

She is perhaps best known for winning the 1500 metres gold at the 1998 Commonwealth Games. Together with 10000 metres winner Esther Wanjiru, she became the first Kenyan woman to win Commonwealth Games gold medal.

She is also a world champion in cross-country running as she won the women's short course at the 1999 IAAF World Cross Country Championships.

Maranga is married to Tom Nyariki.

== Achievements ==
Year	Competition	Venue	Position	Event	Notes
Representing Kenya
1992	World Junior Championships	Seoul, South Korea	—	800m	DQ
1992	World Junior Championships	Seoul, South Korea	2nd	1500m	4:08.79
1994	World Junior Championships	Lisbon, Portugal	2nd	800 metres	2:05.05
1996	World Junior Championships	Sydney, Australia	2nd	1500 metres	4:08.98
1998	Commonwealth Games	Kuala Lumpur, Malaysia	1st	1500 metres	4:05.27
1998	African Championships	Dakar, Senegal	1st	1500 metres	4:11.75
1998	IAAF World Cup	Johannesburg, South Africa	2nd	1500m	4:10.30
1999	World Cross Country Championships	Belfast, United Kingdom	1st	Short race (4.236 km)	15:09
1999	All-Africa Games	Johannesburg, South Africa	3rd	1500 metres	4:19.31
2002	Commonwealth Games	Manchester, United Kingdom	4th	1500 metres	4:08.47
2002	African Championships	Radès, Tunisia	1st	1500 metres	4:18.91
2003	All-Africa Games	Abuja, Nigeria	2nd	1500 metres	4:22.69
2003	World Athletics Final	Monte Carlo, Monaco	2nd	1500 metres	4:01.48
