= Salina Kosgei =

Kenyan long-distance runner

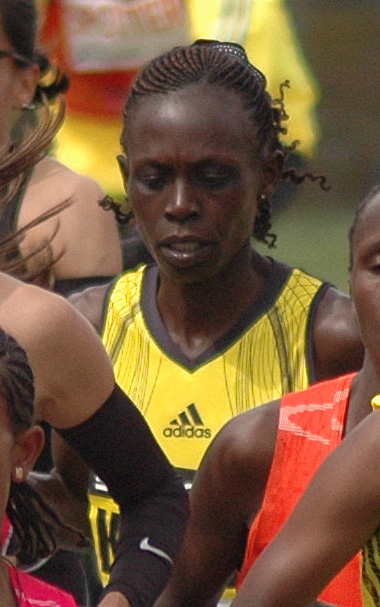
- Salina Kosgei on the way to winning the 2009 Boston Marathon

Personal information
- Nationality: Kenyan
- Born: 16 November 1976 (age 49)

Sport
- Sport: Athletics
- Event: Long-distance running
Medal record
Women's athletics
Representing the Kenya
Gold medal – first place	2009 Boston	Marathon
Bronze medal – third place	2010 Boston	Marathon

Salina Jebet Kosgei (born 16 November 1976 in Simotwo, Keiyo District) is a long distance runner from Kenya. She is a Commonwealth Games gold medalist, has competed at the Olympics and has won various marathons, including the 2009 Boston Marathon.

== Career ==
She began her athletics career while at Simotwo Primary School. She moved to Kapkenda Girls High School and won several national high school titles in heptathlon, 800 metres and 200 metres. She graduated in 1993 and was subsequently recruited by the Kenya Prisons Service.

She competed at the 1994 Commonwealth Games, finishing fifth over 800 metres. After giving birth to her first child in 1996, she decided to try longer distances.

Kosgei won the women's 10,000 metres race at the 2002 Commonwealth Games. Her time, 31:27.83, was a new Commonwealth Games Record.

She competed at the 2003 IAAF World Half Marathon Championships in Vilamoura, Spain, but did not finish better than 41st. Kosgei competed for Kenya at the 2008 Summer Olympics in the marathon, finishing tenth.

On 20 April she won the 2009 Boston Marathon timing 2:32:16, a second ahead of Dire Tune of Ethiopia. She attempted to defend her title the following year's race but the honours went to Teyba Erkesso while Kosgei finished in third place. She had two other marathon races in 2009, coming third at the Grottazzolina Marathon and 15th at the 2010 New York City Marathon. She also won the Florence Half Marathon.

In 2011, she was in the top ten at the Lisbon Half Marathon, Portugal Half Marathon and Yokohama Women's Marathon. Her best result that year was a run of 2:32:06 hours for fifth at the San Diego Marathon. She did not compete in 2012 and made only two appearances in 2013, coming fourth at the Stockholm Marathon and winning the Marathon des Alpes-Maritimes.

== Personal life ==
She is married to hurdler Barnabas Kinyor. They have a son and a daughter, Billy and Ruth, born in 1996 and 2001, respectively.

== Achievements ==
=== Major international competitions ===
Year	Competition	Venue	Position	Event	Notes
Representing Kenya
1992	World Junior Championships	Seoul, South Korea	8th	800 m	2:13.48
1994	World Junior Championships	Lisbon, Portugal	33rd (h)	800m	2:13.24
1994	Commonwealth Games	Vancouver, Canada	5th	800 m	2:03,78
2002	Commonwealth Games	Manchester, United Kingdom	1st	10,000 m	31:27.83
2003	World Championships	Paris, France	19th	10,000 m	32:09.15
2008	Olympic Games	Beijing, China	10th	Marathon	2:29:28

=== Road races ===
Year	Competition	Venue	Position	Event	Notes
2004	Paris Marathon	Paris, France	1st	Marathon	2:24:32
2005	Prague International Marathon	Prague, Czech Republic	1st	Marathon	2:28:42
2005	Virginia Beach Rock 'n' Roll Half Marathon	Virginia Beach, VA, United States	2nd	Half marathon	
2006	Lisbon Half Marathon	Lisbon, Portugal	1st	Half marathon	1:07:52
2006	Singapore Marathon	Singapore	1st	Marathon	2:31:55
2007	Tokyo Marathon	Tokyo, Japan	2nd	Marathon	2:23:31
2007	London Marathon	London, United Kingdom	4th	Marathon	2:24:13
2008	Ras Al Khaimah Half Marathon	Ras Al Khaimah, UAE	1st	Half marathon	1:12:29
2008	Lisbon Half Marathon	Lisbon, Portugal	1st	Half marathon	1:09:57
2009	Boston Marathon	Boston, United States	1st	Marathon	2:32:16
