= Lü Yi (runner) =

Chinese middle-distance runner (born 1974)

Lü Yi (Chinese: 吕亿) (born 10 April 1974) is a retired female Chinese middle-distance runner who specialized in the 800 and 1500 metres.

== Achievements ==
Year	Competition	Venue	Position	Event	Notes
Representing China
1992	World Junior Championships	Seoul, South Korea	1st	800 m	2:02.91
1993	World Championships	Stuttgart, Germany	4th	1500 m	4:06.06
1993	East Asian Games	Shanghai, China	2nd	800 m	2:03.38
