= Athletics at the 2002 Commonwealth Games – Women's 10,000 metres =

Women's 10,000 metres at the Commonwealth Games

The women's 10,000 metres event at the 2002 Commonwealth Games was held on 30 July.

== Results ==
Rank	Name	Nationality	Time	Notes
1st place, gold medalist(s)	Salina Kosgei	Kenya	31:27.83	GR
2nd place, silver medalist(s)	Susan Chepkemei	Kenya	31:32.04	PB
3rd place, bronze medalist(s)	Susie Power	Australia	31:32.20	
4	Liz Yelling	England	31:58.39	PB
5	Hayley Yelling	England	32:29.73	PB
6	Jo Wilkinson	England	33:36.60	PB
7	Allison Higgins	Scotland	33:58.69	
8	Gillian Palmer	Scotland	34:25.50	
	Christiana Augustine	Nigeria	DNS	
	Restituta Kemi	Tanzania	DNS	
	Kerryn McCann	Australia	DNS	
