= 1992 World Junior Championships in Athletics – Women's 800 metres =

The women's 800 metres event at the 1992 World Junior Championships in Athletics was held in Seoul, South Korea, at Olympic Stadium on 16, 17 and 18 September.

== Medalists ==
| Gold | Lu Yi; China |
| Silver | Chen Yumei; China |
| Bronze | Kati Kovacs; Germany |

== Results ==
=== Final ===
18 September

| Rank | Name | Nationality | Time | Notes |
|---|---|---|---|---|
| 1st place, gold medalist(s) | Lu Yi | China | 2:02.91 | |
| 2nd place, silver medalist(s) | Chen Yumei | China | 2:03.14 | |
| 3rd place, bronze medalist(s) | Kati Kovacs | Germany | 2:03.81 | |
| 4 | Natalya Zaytseva | Commonwealth of Independent States | 2:04.76 | |
| 5 | Monica Lundgren | Sweden | 2:05.33 | |
| 6 | Melissa Baker | Australia | 2:05.34 | |
| 7 | Salina Kosgei | Kenya | 2:13.48 | |
| | Séverine Foulon | France | DQ | |

=== Semifinals ===
17 September

==== Semifinal 1 ====
| Rank | Name | Nationality | Time | Notes |
|---|---|---|---|---|
| 1 | Chen Yumei | China | 2:04.27 | Q |
| 2 | Kati Kovacs | Germany | 2:04.39 | Q |
| 3 | Séverine Foulon | France | 2:04.46 | Q |
| 4 | Melissa Baker | Australia | 2:04.49 | Q |
| 5 | Emma James | New Zealand | 2:04.58 | |
| 6 | Michelle Wilkinson | United Kingdom | 2:06.71 | |
| 7 | Mariana Florea | Romania | 2:08.00 | |
| 8 | Irina Bezmenova | Commonwealth of Independent States | 2:09.32 | |

==== Semifinal 2 ====
| Rank | Name | Nationality | Time | Notes |
|---|---|---|---|---|
| 1 | Lu Yi | China | 2:03.96 | Q |
| 2 | Natalya Zaytseva | Commonwealth of Independent States | 2:06.68 | Q |
| 3 | Salina Kosgei | Kenya | 2:06.86 | Q |
| 4 | Monica Lundgren | Sweden | 2:06.93 | Q |
| 5 | Aurica Rautu | Romania | 2:07.22 | |
| 6 | Andrea Šuldesová | Czechoslovakia | 2:08.30 | |
| 7 | Kim Hae-Yeong | South Korea | 2:08.80 | |
| 8 | Rachael Rowberry | New Zealand | 2:17.17 | |

=== Heats ===
16 September

==== Heat 1 ====
| Rank | Name | Nationality | Time | Notes |
|---|---|---|---|---|
| 1 | Kati Kovacs | Germany | 2:04.98 | Q |
| 2 | Séverine Foulon | France | 2:06.19 | Q |
| 3 | Melissa Baker | Australia | 2:06.21 | Q |
| 4 | Andrea Šuldesová | Czechoslovakia | 2:08.15 | q |
| 5 | Michelle Wilkinson | United Kingdom | 2:08.56 | q |
| 6 | Rachael Rowberry | New Zealand | 2:09.77 | q |

==== Heat 2 ====
| Rank | Name | Nationality | Time | Notes |
|---|---|---|---|---|
| 1 | Chen Yumei | China | 2:11.18 | Q |
| 2 | Emma James | New Zealand | 2:12.39 | Q |
| 3 | Mariana Florea | Romania | 2:13.05 | Q |
| 4 | Yumiko Tokuda | Japan | 2:14.19 | |
| 5 | Fátima dos Santos | Brazil | 2:14.60 | |

==== Heat 3 ====
| Rank | Name | Nationality | Time | Notes |
|---|---|---|---|---|
| 1 | Salina Kosgei | Kenya | 2:07.57 | Q |
| 2 | Natalya Zaytseva | Commonwealth of Independent States | 2:08.53 | Q |
| 3 | Monica Lundgren | Sweden | 2:09.04 | Q |
| 4 | Kim Hae-Yeong | South Korea | 2:09.95 | q |
| 5 | Ludmila Formanová | Czechoslovakia | 2:22.34 | |
| 6 | Alison Cano | Gibraltar | 2:22.68 | |

==== Heat 4 ====
| Rank | Name | Nationality | Time | Notes |
|---|---|---|---|---|
| 1 | Lu Yi | China | 2:03.75 | Q |
| 2 | Irina Bezmenova | Commonwealth of Independent States | 2:08.11 | Q |
| 3 | Aurica Rautu | Romania | 2:09.80 | Q |
| 4 | Plamena Aleksandrova | Bulgaria | 2:15.90 | |
| 5 | Jowanna McMullen | United States | 2:16.24 | |
| | Jackline Maranga | Kenya | DQ | |

== Participation ==
According to an unofficial count, 23 athletes from 17 countries participated in the event.

- Australia (1)
- Brazil (1)
- Bulgaria (1)
- China (2)
- Commonwealth of Independent States (2)
- Czechoslovakia (2)
- France (1)
- Germany (1)
- Gibraltar (1)
- Japan (1)
- Kenya (2)
- New Zealand (2)
- Romania (2)
- South Korea (1)
- Sweden (1)
- United Kingdom (1)
- United States (1)
