= 1994 World Junior Championships in Athletics – Women's 800 metres =

The women's 800 metres event at the 1994 World Junior Championships in Athletics was held in Lisbon, Portugal, at Estádio Universitário de Lisboa on 20, 21 and 22 July.

== Medalists ==
| Gold | Mioara Cosuleanu; Romania |
| Silver | Jackline Maranga; Kenya |
| Bronze | Kutre Dulecha; Ethiopia |

== Results ==
=== Final ===
22 July

| Rank | Name | Nationality | Time | Notes |
|---|---|---|---|---|
| 1st place, gold medalist(s) | Mioara Cosuleanu | Romania | 2:04.95 | |
| 2nd place, silver medalist(s) | Jackline Maranga | Kenya | 2:05.05 | |
| 3rd place, bronze medalist(s) | Kutre Dulecha | Ethiopia | 2:05.17 | |
| 4 | Grazyna Penc | Poland | 2:05.66 | |
| 5 | Lyudmila Voronicheva | Russia | 2:06.66 | |
| 6 | Kumiko Okamoto | Japan | 2:07.09 | |
| 7 | Eleonora Berlanda | Italy | 2:07.26 | |
| 8 | Szilvia Csoszánszky | Hungary | 2:10.75 | |

=== Semifinals ===
21 July

==== Semifinal 1 ====
| Rank | Name | Nationality | Time | Notes |
|---|---|---|---|---|
| 1 | Kutre Dulecha | Ethiopia | 2:06.26 | Q |
| 2 | Grazyna Penc | Poland | 2:06.63 | Q |
| 3 | Eleonora Berlanda | Italy | 2:06.67 | Q |
| 3 | Lyudmila Voronicheva | Russia | 2:06.67 | Q |
| 5 | Lavinia Miroiu | Romania | 2:06.78 | |
| 6 | Romana Sanigová | Czech Republic | 2:07.40 | |
| 7 | Jolanda Steblovnik | Slovenia | 2:09.35 | |
| 8 | Nuria Fernández | Spain | 2:11.38 | |

==== Semifinal 2 ====
| Rank | Name | Nationality | Time | Notes |
|---|---|---|---|---|
| 1 | Jackline Maranga | Kenya | 2:04.07 | Q |
| 2 | Mioara Cosuleanu | Romania | 2:04.73 | Q |
| 3 | Kumiko Okamoto | Japan | 2:05.19 | Q |
| 4 | Szilvia Csoszánszky | Hungary | 2:06.41 | Q |
| 5 | Yekaterina Fedotova | Russia | 2:06.44 | |
| 6 | Mayte Martínez | Spain | 2:07.00 | |
| 7 | Tytti Reho | Finland | 2:09.52 | |
| 8 | Shura Hotesa | Ethiopia | 2:15.08 | |

=== Heats ===
20 July

==== Heat 1 ====
| Rank | Name | Nationality | Time | Notes |
|---|---|---|---|---|
| 1 | Kutre Dulecha | Ethiopia | 2:06.74 | Q |
| 2 | Mioara Cosuleanu | Romania | 2:06.75 | Q |
| 3 | Tytti Reho | Finland | 2:07.22 | q |
| 4 | Jolanda Steblovnik | Slovenia | 2:07.63 | q |
| 5 | Vicki Freeborn | Australia | 2:07.68 | |
| 6 | Marie-Louise Henning | South Africa | 2:07.81 | |
| 7 | Jeina Mitchell | United Kingdom | 2:12.68 | |
| 8 | Mercy Kaunda | Malawi | 2:14.75 | |

==== Heat 2 ====
| Rank | Name | Nationality | Time | Notes |
|---|---|---|---|---|
| 1 | Lavinia Miroiu | Romania | 2:06.74 | Q |
| 2 | Eleonora Berlanda | Italy | 2:06.75 | Q |
| 3 | Shura Hotesa | Ethiopia | 2:07.22 | q |
| 4 | Nuria Fernández | Spain | 2:07.63 | q |
| 5 | Dorothea Lee | United Kingdom | 2:07.68 | |
| 6 | Heather DeGeest | Canada | 2:07.81 | |
| 7 | Tatyana Borisova | Kyrgyzstan | 2:12.68 | |
| 8 | Liu Huirong | China | 2:14.75 | |

==== Heat 3 ====
| Rank | Name | Nationality | Time | Notes |
|---|---|---|---|---|
| 1 | Jackline Maranga | Kenya | 2:05.22 | Q |
| 2 | Romana Sanigová | Czech Republic | 2:06.25 | Q |
| 3 | Szilvia Csoszánszky | Hungary | 2:06.48 | q |
| 4 | Yekaterina Fedotova | Russia | 2:07.52 | q |
| 5 | Martina Hauke | Germany | 2:09.35 | |
| 6 | Sandra Stals | Belgium | 2:21.94 | |
| 7 | Natalia Estefania | Angola | 2:23.01 | |
| 8 | Jowanna McMullen | United States | 2:24.55 | |

==== Heat 4 ====
| Rank | Name | Nationality | Time | Notes |
|---|---|---|---|---|
| 1 | Grazyna Penc | Poland | 2:07.75 | Q |
| 2 | Mayte Martínez | Spain | 2:08.11 | Q |
| 3 | Andrea Šuldesová | Czech Republic | 2:08.23 | |
| 4 | Anda Vukadinovic | Yugoslavia | 2:09.68 | |
| 5 | Julian Reynolds | United States | 2:09.85 | |
| 6 | Michelle Ballentine | Jamaica | 2:10.65 | |
| 7 | Miriam Maseková | Slovakia | 2:11.54 | |
| 8 | Dithapelo Molefi | Botswana | 2:12.96 | |

==== Heat 5 ====
| Rank | Name | Nationality | Time | Notes |
|---|---|---|---|---|
| 1 | Lyudmila Voronicheva | Russia | 2:07.87 | Q |
| 2 | Kumiko Okamoto | Japan | 2:08.42 | Q |
| 3 | Jelena Stanisavljevic | Yugoslavia | 2:09.70 | |
| 4 | Sarah Jamieson | Australia | 2:10.14 | |
| 5 | Plamena Zhekova | Bulgaria | 2:10.51 | |
| 6 | Salina Kosgei | Kenya | 2:13.24 | |
| 7 | Mairelín Fuentes | Cuba | 2:13.46 | |

== Participation ==
According to an unofficial count, 39 athletes from 29 countries participated in the event.

- Angola (1)
- Australia (2)
- Belgium (1)
- Botswana (1)
- Bulgaria (1)
- Canada (1)
- China (1)
- Cuba (1)
- Czech Republic (2)
- Ethiopia (2)
- Finland (1)
- Germany (1)
- Hungary (1)
- Italy (1)
- Jamaica (1)
- Japan (1)
- Kenya (2)
- Kyrgyzstan (1)
- Malawi (1)
- Poland (1)
- Romania (2)
- Russia (2)
- Slovakia (1)
- Slovenia (1)
- South Africa (1)
- Spain (2)
- United Kingdom (2)
- United States (2)
- Yugoslavia (2)
