= 2002 African Championships in Athletics – Women's 1500 metres =

The women's 1500 metres event at the 2002 African Championships in Athletics was held in Radès, Tunisia on August 10.

== Results ==
Rank	Name	Nationality	Time	Notes
1st place, gold medalist(s)	Jackline Maranga	Kenya	4:18.91	
2nd place, silver medalist(s)	Abir Nakhli	Tunisia	4:19.02	
3rd place, bronze medalist(s)	Hasna Benhassi	Morocco	4:20.15	
4	Meskerem Legesse	Ethiopia	4:20.29	
5	Margaret Chirchir	Kenya	4:21.56	
6	Berhane Herpassa	Ethiopia	4:23.47	
7	Seloua Ouaziz	Morocco	4:23.51	
8	Amel Tlili	Tunisia	4:24.02	
9	Nahida Touhami	Algeria	4:25.50	
10	Lemlem Bereket	Eritrea	4:26.32	
11	Hind Musa	Sudan	4:27.68	
12	Kedjidja Touati	Algeria	4:27.85	
13	Sonia Boubaker	Tunisia	4:28.01	
14	Lamberte Nyabamikazi	Burundi	4:36.23	
15	Bentille Alassane	Benin	4:40.97	
16	Sonia Lopes	Cape Verde	4:56.92	
