= Nyanturago =

Nyanturago is a town in Kisii County, Kenya. It is part of Gusii County council and Masaba south sub-county district. It is about 37 Km southeast of Kisii, and takes roughly 50 minutes to drive there.

It is the birthplace of famous runner Jackline Maranga.

== Climate ==
Climate data for Nyanturago, Kenya
Month	Jan	Feb	Mar	Apr	May	Jun	Jul	Aug	Sep	Oct	Nov	Dec	Year
Mean daily maximum °F	76	77	77	73	73	71	69	71	74	75	73	74	74
Mean daily minimum °F	51	53	53	55	53	51	50	50	49	52	53	52	52
Mean daily maximum °C	24	25	25	23	23	22	21	22	23	24	23	23	23
Mean daily minimum °C	11	12	12	13	12	11	10	10	9	11	12	11	11
