= Hayley Ovens =

British athletics competitor

Personal information
- Nationality: British (Scottish)
- Born: 5 December 1975 (age 49) Edinburgh, Scotland
- Height: 168 cm (5 ft 6 in)
- Weight: 54 kg (119 lb)

Sport
- Sport: Athletics
- Event: middle-distance
- Club: Edinburgh Woollen Mill AC
- Retired: 2006

Hayley Ovens (born 5 December 1975) is a British retired athlete who competed in the 400m, 800m, 1500m and 3000m.

== Biography ==
Ovens was a finalist in the 2002 Commonwealth Games in Manchester, where she finished in 12th place. In 2003, she competed for Great Britain and Northern Ireland in the World Indoor Championships, exiting at the semi-final stage and finished second behind Hayley Tullett in the 1500 metres event at the 2003 AAA Championships.

In 2006, she was a finalist in the 1500m at the Melbourne Commonwealth Games, finishing 10th. She is a multiple Scottish and UK Champion both indoors and out. Her personal best for the 1500m is 4:10:34 and for the 800m is 2:03:19.

Ovens retired from competitive athletics in 2006.
