= Bermuda at the 2009 World Championships in Athletics =

- WA code: BER

in Berlin
- Competitors: 1
- Medals: Gold 0 Silver 0 Bronze 0 Total 0

World Championships in Athletics appearances
- 1983; 1987; 1991; 1993; 1995; 1997; 1999; 2001; 2003–2007; 2009; 2011; 2013; 2015; 2017; 2019; 2022; 2023; 2025

Bermuda competed at the 2009 World Championships in Athletics in Berlin, Germany, which were held from 15 to 23 August 2009. The athlete delegation consisted of one competitor, long jumper Tyrone Smith. Competing in the men's long jump, Smith had his second attempt at 7.72 metres as his best attempt and placed 31st overall in the qualification round, failing to qualify for the finals of the event.

== Background ==
The 2009 World Championships in Athletics were held at the Olympiastadion in Berlin, Germany. Under the auspices of the International Amateur Athletic Federation, this was the twelfth edition of the World Championships. It was held from 15 to 23 August 2009 and had 47 different events. Among the competing teams was the British Overseas Territory of Bermuda. For this edition of the World Championships in Athletics, long jumper Tyrone Smith was the sole athlete of the territory. This edition of the World Championships marked Smith's first appearance, with five more participations in future editions of the Championships.

== Results ==
=== Men ===
Smith competed in the qualification round of the men's long jump on 20 August 2009 in Group B against 21 other long jumpers. There, he recorded attempts of 7.62 metres for his first, 7.72 for his second and longest distance, and 7.71 metres for his last. Overall, he finished 31st in the qualification round and did not qualify for the finals held the next day as only long jumpers who have jumped 8.15 metres or higher and at least twelve best performers would only be able to do so.

Event	Athletes	Qualification		Final	
Event	Athletes	Result	Rank	Result	Rank
Long jump	Tyrone Smith	7.72	31	did not advance	
