= Hayley Tullett =

Welsh middle-distance runner

Hayley Tullett née Parry
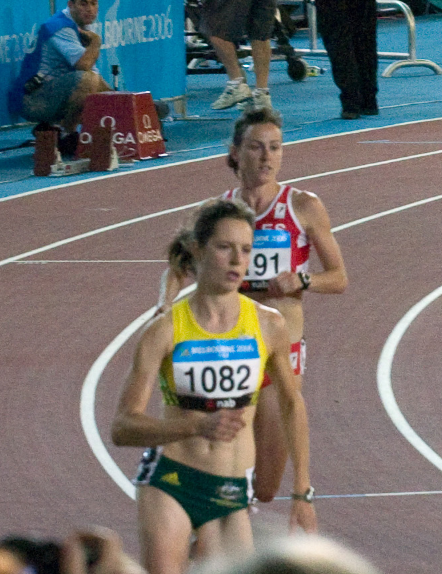
- Tullett (right) 2006 Commonwealth Games 800 metres semi-final

Personal information
- Nationality: British (Welshh)
- Born: 17 February 1973 (age 53) Swansea, Wales
- Height: 165 cm (5 ft 5 in)
- Weight: 55 kg (121 lb)

Sport
- Sport: Athletics
- Event: middle-distance
- Club: Swansea Harriers
Medal record
Representing Great Britain
Athletics
World Championships
Bronze medal – third place	2003 Paris	1500 m
Representing Wales
Commonwealth Games
Silver medal – second place	2002 Manchester	1500 m
Bronze medal – third place	2006 Melbourne	1500 m

Hayley Tullett (née Parry, born 17 February 1973) is a Welsh former middle-distance runner who competed at two Olympic Games.

== Biography ==
Born Hayley Parry in Swansea in 1973, she married pole vaulter Ian Tullett in 1999. During the same year, she became the British 1500 metres champion after winning the British AAA Championships title at the 1999 AAA Championships.

Tullett retained her AAA title at the 2000 AAA Championships before representing Great Britain at the 2000 Olympic Games in Sydney.

Tullett regained the 1500 AAA title at the 2003 AAA Championships, the same year that she won a bronze medal in the 1500m final at the 2003 World Championships. Further success arrived the following year with her fourth AAA Title before she appeared in her second Olympic Games, where Tullett competed in the 1500 metres again representing Great Britain at the 2004 Olympic Games in Athens.

Tullett won a silver medal behind Kelly Holmes at the 2002 Commonwealth Games and a bronze medal for Wales at the 2006 Commonwealth Games in Melbourne.

== Personal bests ==
- 800 metres – 2:00.49 (2003)
- 1500 metres – 3:59.95 (2004)
- 3000 metres – 8:45.39 (2000)

== Achievements ==
Year	Competition	Venue	Position	Event	Notes
2000	Olympic Games	Sydney, Australia	11th (fell)	1500 m	4:22.35
2002	Commonwealth Games	Manchester, England	2nd	1500 m	4:07.52
2003	World Championships	Paris, France	3rd	1500 m	3:59.95
2003	World Athletics Final	Monte Carlo, Monaco	3rd	1500 m	4:01.60
2004	Olympic Games	Athens, Greece	20th (sf)	1500 m	4:08.92
2006	Commonwealth Games	Melbourne, Australia	3rd	1500 m	4:06.76
