= Kutre Dulecha =

Ethiopian middle-distance runner

Kutre Dulecha (born August 22, 1978, in Sidamo) is an Ethiopian middle distance runner. She mainly competes in 1500 metres, where she set a world junior record in 1997. She became world indoor champion in 2004, Ethiopia's first ever women's 1500 m medalist at the championships. She won the women's short course at the 2000 IAAF World Cross Country Championships.

== International competitions ==
Year	Competition	Venue	Position	Event	Notes
Representing Ethiopia
1994	World Junior Championships	Lisbon, Portugal	3rd	800m	2:05.17
1994	World Junior Championships	Lisbon, Portugal	5th	1500m	4:17.39
1995	All-Africa Games	Harare, Zimbabwe	1st	1500 metres	4:18.32
1995	All-Africa Games	Harare, Zimbabwe	3rd	800 metres	2:02.26
1996	World Junior Championships	Sydney, Australia	1st	1500m	4:08.65
1998	World Cross Country Championships	Marrakesh, Morocco	3rd	Short race (4 km)	12:37
1999	World Championships	Seville, Spain	3rd	1500 metres	4:00.96
1999	All-Africa Games	Johannesburg, South Africa	1st	1500 metres	4:18.33
2000	World Cross Country Championships	Vilamoura, Portugal	1st	Short race (4.18 km)	13:00
2000	Summer Olympics	Sydney, Australia	4th	1500 metres	4:05.33
2000	IAAF Grand Prix Final	Doha, Qatar	2nd	1500 metres	4:15.75
2003	All-Africa Games	Abuja, Nigeria	1st	1500 metres	4:21.63
2004	World Indoor Championships	Budapest, Hungary	1st	1500 metres	4:06.40
2005	Amsterdam Marathon	Amsterdam, Netherlands	1st	Marathon	2:30:05

== Personal bests ==
- 800 metres – 1:59.37 (1999)
- 1000 metres – 2:37.82 (1999)
- 1500 metres – 3:58.43 (1998)
- One mile – 4:39.04 (1997)
- 15 kilometres – 50:28 (2005)
- Half marathon – 1:10:54 (2005)
- Marathon – 2:32:29 (2005)
