= Sarah Jamieson (runner) =

Australian middle-distance runner

Personal information
- Born: 24 March 1975 (age 51) Perth, Western Australia, Australia

Sport
- Sport: Track and field
Medal record
Representing Australia
Commonwealth Games
Silver medal – second place	2006 Melbourne	1500m

Sarah Louise Jamieson (born 24 March 1975) is an Australian middle-distance runner.

Jamieson represented Australia at the Summer Olympics on three occasions - in 2000, 2004 and 2008.

Jamieson won a silver medal at the 2006 Commonwealth Games.

In 2006, she became the Australian 1500m record-holder with a time of 4:00.93. It was beaten in 2018 by Linden Hall, whom Jamieson had previously coached.

== Achievements ==
Year	Competition	Venue	Position	Event	Notes
Representing Australia
1994	World Junior Championships	Lisbon, Portugal	26th (h)	800m	2:10.14
1994	World Junior Championships	Lisbon, Portugal	15th (h)	1500m	4:25.32
2002	World Cup	Madrid, Spain	8th	1500 m	4:12.33
2004	World Cross Country Championships	Brussels, Belgium	15th	Short race (4 km)	13:40
2005	World Cross Country Championships	St Etienne, France	13th	Short race (4.196 km)	13:44
2006	Commonwealth Games	Melbourne, Australia	2nd	1500 m	4:06.64
2006	Commonwealth Games	Melbourne, Australia	5th	5000 m	15:02.90 PB
2006	World Athletics Final	Stuttgart, Germany	4th	1500 m	4:04.32
2006	World Cup	Athens, Greece	3rd	1500 m	4:02.82
2007	World Championships	Osaka, Japan	17th (sf)	1500 m	4:16.20
2007	World Athletics Final	Stuttgart, Germany	3rd	1500 m	4:05.43
2008	Olympics	Beijing, PR China	10th (h)	1500 m	4:06.64
2008	World Athletics Final	Stuttgart, Germany	9th	1500 m	4:09.21

=== Personal bests ===
- 800 metres – 2:02.81 (1999)
- 1500 metres – 4:00.93 (2006)
- One mile run – 4:23.40 (2007)
- 3000 metres – 8:48.41 (2007)
- 5000 metres – 15:02.90 (2006)
