= Caitlyn Bobb =

Bermudan athlete (born 2003)

Personal information
- Born: 23 April 2003 (age 23)

Sport
- Sport: Athletics
- Event: Sprint

Achievements and titles
- Personal bests: 200m: 23.30 (2024); 400m: 51.11 (2025) NR; Indoors; 200m: 23.95 (2024) NR; 400m: 52.69 (2025) NR
Medal record
Women's athletics
Representing Bermuda
Junior Pan American Games
Silver medal – second place	2025 Asunción	400 m
CARIFTA Games Junior (U20)
Bronze medal – third place	2022 Kingston	400 m

Caitlyn Bobb (born 23 April 2003) is a Bermudan sprinter who primarily competes over 400 metres, in which she is the national record holder, both indoors and outdoors. She is also the national record holder over 200 metres indoors.

== Biography ==
Bobb grew up in Maryland in the United States, where her father David, the 100 metres NCAA Outdoor Championship runner-up in 1996, worked as a coach in track and field; although never directly her coach. She converted to Islam in 2022. That year, she represented Bermuda at the 2022 Commonwealth Games in Birmingham, England.

She competed in the collegiate system in the United States for the University of Maryland before transferring to Virginia Tech in 2024. She ran a Bermuda record of 51.11 for the 400 metres in winning tho Atlantic Conference Championship in May 2025. She proceeded to qualify for the 2025 NCAA Championships in Eugene, Oregon, where she was a semi-finalist in the 400 metres. She graduated from college that summer with the intention of pursuing a professional running career.

Bobb reached the final of the 400 metres at the 2025 NACAC Championships in Freeport, The Bahamas in August 2025 but could not compete in the final. Later that month, she won the silver medal over 400 metres behind Dianna Proctor of Canada at the 2025 Pan American Junior Games in Asunción, Paraguay in August 2025 in 52.14 seconds.

Bobb became the first Bermudan woman to compete at the World Championships since Arantxa King in 2013 when she ran at the 2025 World Athletics Championships in Tokyo, Japan, in September 2025, running the women's 400 metres in a time of 51.74 seconds to place fifth in her heat, which was won by Sydney McLaughlin-Levrone.

Bobb competed over 400 metres at the 2026 World Athletics Indoor Championships in Toruń, Poland. In July, she was a semi-finalist in the 400 metres at the 2026 Commonwealth Games in Glasgow, Scotland.
