= Bermuda at the 1983 World Championships in Athletics =

- Flag of Bermuda
- WA code: BER

in Helsinki, Finland August 7–14, 1983
- Competitors: 4 (3 men and 1 woman) in 4 events
- Medals: Gold 0 Silver 0 Bronze 0 Total 0

World Championships in Athletics appearances
- 1983; 1987; 1991; 1993; 1995; 1997; 1999; 2001; 2003–2007; 2009; 2011; 2013; 2015; 2017; 2019; 2022; 2023; 2025

Bermuda competed at the 1983 World Championships in Athletics in Helsinki, Finland, from August 7 to 14, 1983.

== Men ==
Track and road events

Athlete	Event	Heat		Quarterfinal		Semifinal		Final	
Athlete	Event	Result	Rank	Result	Rank	Result	Rank	Result	Rank
Gregory Simons	100 metres	10.78	43	Did not advance					
Raymond Swan	Marathon	—N/a						2:33:20	58

Field events

Athlete	Event	Qualification		Final	
Athlete	Event	Distance	Position	Distance	Position
Clarence Saunders	High jump	2.15	=20	Did not advance	

== Women ==
Track and road events

Athlete	Event	Heat		Semifinal		Final	
Athlete	Event	Result	Rank	Result	Rank	Result	Rank
Jennifer Bean	800 metres	2:13.80	16 q	2:12.93	16	Did not advance	
