= Bermuda National Athletics Association =

Governing body for athletics in Bermuda

- Sport: Athletics
- Jurisdiction: Association
- Abbreviation: BNAA
- Founded: 1946
- Affiliation: IAAF
- Affiliation date: 1974
- Regional affiliation: NACAC
- Headquarters: Hamilton
- President: Dr. Freddie Evans
- Secretary: Mia Bean
- Other key staff: DeVon Bean
- Replaced: Bermuda Track & Field Association

Official website
- www.athleticsbda.com
- (Bermuda)

The Bermuda National Athletics Association (BNAA) is the governing body for the sport of athletics in Bermuda. Current president is Dr. Freddie Evans. He was elected for the first time in 2021.

== History ==
Former logo of BTFA.

BNAA was founded in 1946 as Bermuda Track & Field Association (BTFA) and was affiliated to the IAAF in 1974. In 2012, the name was changed to Bermuda National Athletics Association (BNAA).

== Affiliations ==
BNAA is the national member federation for Bermuda in the following international organisations:

- International Association of Athletics Federations (IAAF)
- North American, Central American and Caribbean Athletic Association (NACAC)
- Association of Panamerican Athletics (APA)
- Central American and Caribbean Athletic Confederation (CACAC)

Moreover, it is part of the following national organisations:

- Bermuda Olympic Association (BOA)

== Members ==
BNAA comprises eight Affiliated Clubs.

== National records ==
BNAA maintains the Bermudian records in athletics.
