= Arantxa King =

Bermudian athlete

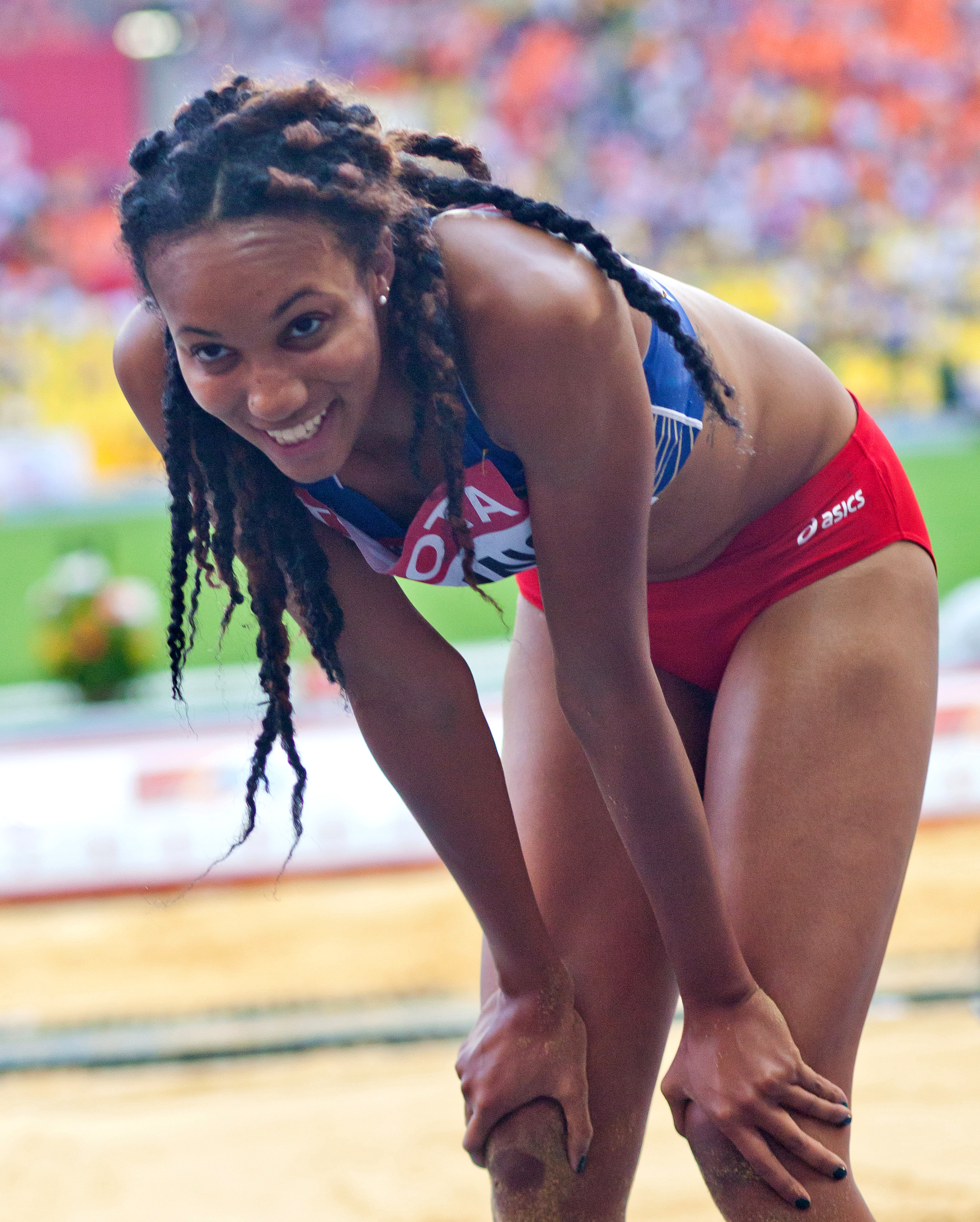
- Arantxa King during the 2013 World Championships in Athletics in Moscow

Personal information
- Born: 27 November 1989 (age 36) Paget Parish, Bermuda
- Height: 1.80 m (5 ft 11 in)
- Weight: 70 kg (154 lb)

Sport
- Country: Bermuda
- Sport: Athletics
- Event: Long Jump

Arantxa King (born 27 November 1989) is a Bermudian athlete competing in the long jump.

== Biography ==
King was born in Paget Parish, Bermuda on 27 November 1989. Her mother, Branwen Smith-King, is a former Bermuda national track and field team member while her father Adrian King is a former international cricket player. Her sister Akilah was also an accomplished athlete at Brown University.

King competed at the 2005 IAAF World Youth Championships in Marrakesh, Morocco. With a best jump of 6.39 m, she won the World Youth title in women's Long Jump. She competed at the 11th IAAF World Junior Championships in Beijing, China, in 2006, and the 12th IAAF World Junior Championships in Bydgoszcz, Poland, in 2008. She also competed for Bermuda at the 2008 Summer Olympics in Beijing, and in 2006, she also competed at the 2006 Commonwealth Games. She has competed at the XXX Olympic Games in London, England, in 2012, at the 14th IAAF World Championships in Moscow, Russia, in 2013, and the Commonwealth Games in Scotland, in 2014.

Internationally, King has won a silver medal in long jump at the 2011 Central American and Caribbean Championships in Mayaguez, Puerto Rico, and multiple junior medals in Carifta, Pan American Games, and Central American and Caribbean games.

King competed for Stanford University, where she was a two-time All-American and finished as a runner-up at the 2010 NCAA Outdoor Championships. She completed a degree in Political Science in 2011 and a master's degree in 2012 at Stanford.

== National records ==
She holds the Bermuda national record for the women's long jump, both outdoors and indoors.

Event	Performance	Place, date
100 Metres	11.88 (+0.4 m/s)	Mexico, June 2013
Long Jump	6.50 m (+2.0 m/s)	Austin, United States, 31 March 2012
Triple Jump	13.28 m (+1.5 m/s)	Des Moines, United States, June 2012
