= Jah-Nhai Perinchief =

Bermudian triple jumper

Personal information
- Born: 13 December 1997 (age 28) Paget, Bermuda

Sport
- Country: Bermuda
- Sport: Athletics
- Event: Triple jump
Medal record
Men's athletics
Representing Bermuda
Commonwealth Games
Bronze medal – third place	2022 Birmingham	Triple jump

Jah-Nhai Perinchief (born 13 December 1997) is a Bermudian triple jumper. He competed at the 2021 NCAA Division I Outdoor Track and Field Championships for the Tennessee Volunteers track and field team, winning the silver medal in the triple jump event. He also competed at the 2022 Commonwealth Games, winning the bronze medal in the men's triple jump event.

Olympic Games
Preceded by Dara Alizadeh	Flagbearer for Bermuda; Paris 2024 with Adriana Penruddocke	Succeeded by Incumbent
