= 2024 European Athletics Championships – Women's 1500 metres =

Women's 1500 metres at the 2024 European Athletics Championships
- Venue: Stadio Olimpico
- Location: Rome
- Dates: 7 June (round 1); 9 June (final)
- Competitors: 29 from 18 nations
- Winning time: 4:04.66

Medalists
gold medal	Ciara Mageean	Ireland
silver medal	Georgia Bell	Great Britain
bronze medal	Agathe Guillemot	France

The women's 1500 metres at the 2024 European Athletics Championships took place at the Stadio Olimpico on 7 and 9 June.

== Records ==
Standing records prior to the 2024 European Athletics Championships
World record	Faith Kipyegon (KEN)	3:49.11	Firenze, Italy	2 June 2023
European record	Sifan Hassan (NED)	3:51.95	Doha, Qatar	5 October 2019
Championship record	Tatyana Tomashova (RUS)	3:56.91	Gothenburg, Sweden	13 August 2006
World Leading	Gudaf Tsegay (ETH)	3:50.30	Xiamen, China	20 April 2024
Europe Leading	Laura Muir (GBR)	3:56.35	Eugene, United States	25 May 2024

== Schedule ==
Date	Time	Round
7 June 2024	11:45	Round 1
9 June 2024	22:36	Final

All times are local times (UTC+2)

== Results ==
=== Round 1 ===
The first 6 of each heat (Q) advance to the final.

Rank	Heat	Name	Nationality	Time	Note
1	1	Jemma Reekie	Great Britain	4:06.68	Q
2	1	Ludovica Cavalli	Italy	4:06.76	Q
3	1	Ciara Mageean	Ireland	4:06.81	Q
4	1	Salomé Afonso	Portugal	4:06.83	Q
5	1	Yolanda Ngarambe	Sweden	4:06.96	Q
6	1	Esther Guerrero	Spain	4:07.01	Q
7	1	Sara Lappalainen	Finland	4:07.39	SB
8	1	Vera Hoffmann	Luxembourg	4:10.43	
9	1	Elise Vanderelst	Belgium	4:11.03	
10	1	Sintayehu Vissa	Italy	4:11.22	
11	2	Agathe Guillemot	France	4:11.92	Q
12	2	Georgia Bell	Great Britain	4:12.01	Q
13	2	Katie Snowden	Great Britain	4:12.17	Q
14	2	Sarah Healy	Ireland	4:12.30	Q
15	2	Aleksandra Płocińska	Poland	4:12.53	Q
16	2	Marta Pérez	Spain	4:12.63	Q
17	1	Ingeborg Østgård	Norway	4:12.73	
18	2	Kristiina Sasínek Mäki	Czech Republic	4:12.76	
19	2	Marissa Damink	Netherlands	4:13.16	
20	2	Hanna Hermansson	Sweden	4:13.34	
21	1	Sofia Ennaoui	Poland	4:13.71	
22	1	Joceline Wind	Switzerland	4:15.06	
23	2	Martyna Galant	Poland	4:15.31	
24	2	Amalie Sæten	Norway	4:16.07	
25	2	Sivan Auerbach	Israel	4:16.15	
26	2	Nele Weßel	Germany	4:16.54	qR
27	1	Lenuta Simiuc	Romania	4:23.56	
	2	Marta Zenoni	Italy	DQ	
	1	Berenice Cleyet-Merle	France	DNF	

=== Final ===
The final started on 9 June at 22:40.

Rank	Name	Nationality	Time	Note
1st place, gold medalist(s)	Ciara Mageean	Ireland	4:04.66	
2nd place, silver medalist(s)	Georgia Bell	Great Britain	4:05.33	
3rd place, bronze medalist(s)	Agathe Guillemot	France	4:05.69	
4	Esther Guerrero	Spain	4:06.03	
5	Jemma Reekie	Great Britain	4:06.17	
6	Marta Pérez	Spain	4:06.32	
7	Sarah Healy	Ireland	4:06.77	
8	Salomé Afonso	Portugal	4:06.80	
9	Katie Snowden	Great Britain	4:06.83	
10	Yolanda Ngarambe	Sweden	4:07.59	
11	Nele Weßel	Germany	4:07.76	
12	Aleksandra Płocińska	Poland	4:09.07	
13	Ludovica Cavalli	Italy	4:35.60	
