= 2023 European Athletics Indoor Championships – Women's 1500 metres =

Women's 1500 metres at the 2023 European Athletics Indoor Championships
- Venue: Ataköy Athletics Arena
- Location: Istanbul, Turkey
- Dates: 3 March 2023 (round 1); 4 March 2023 (final)
- Competitors: 21 from 14 nations
- Winning time: 4:03.40

Medalists
gold medal	Laura Muir	Great Britain
silver medal	Claudia Bobocea	Romania
bronze medal	Sofia Ennaoui	Poland

The women's 1500 metres event at the 2023 European Athletics Indoor Championships was held on 3 March 2023 at 11:30 (heats), and on 4 March at 20:00 (final) local time.

== Records ==
Standing records prior to the 2023 European Athletics Indoor Championships
World record	Gudaf Tsegay (ETH)	3:53.09	Liévin, France	9 February 2021
European record	Abeba Aregawi (SWE)	3:57.91	Stockholm, Sweden	6 February 2014
Championship record	Laura Muir (GBR)	4:02.39	Belgrade, Serbia	4 March 2017
World Leading	Gudaf Tsegay (ETH)	3:57.47	Liévin, France	15 February 2023
European Leading	Laura Muir (GBR)	4:03.03	New York, United States	11 February 2023

== Results ==
=== Heats ===
Qualification: First 3 in each heat (Q) and the next 3 fastest (q) advance to the Final.

Rank	Heat	Athlete	Nationality	Time	Note
1	1	Claudia Bobocea	Romania	4:07.63	Q
2	1	Sofia Ennaoui	Poland	4:07.91	Q
3	1	Katie Snowden	Great Britain	4:08.27	Q
4	1	Sintayehu Vissa	Italy	4:08.54	q
5	1	Vera Hoffmann	Luxembourg	4:08.73	q
6	1	Hanna Hermansson	Sweden	4.09.32	q
7	3	Esther Guerrero	Spain	4:10.48	Q
8	3	Ellie Baker	Great Britain	4:10.65	Q
9	3	Kristiina Mäki	Czech Republic	4:10.86	Q
10	3	Nathalie Blomqvist	Finland	4:10.91	
11	3	Marissa Damink	Netherlands	4:11.38	
12	3	Şilan Ayyıldız	Turkey	4:11.55	
13	3	Salomé Afonso	Portugal	4:16.59	
14	1	Berenice Cleyet-Merle	France	4:18.58	
15	2	Laura Muir	Great Britain	4:23.20	Q
16	2	Marta Pen Freitas	Portugal	4:23.30	Q
17	2	Águeda Marqués	Spain	4:23.39	Q
18	2	Weronika Lizakowska	Poland	4:23.57	
19	2	Federica Del Buono	Italy	4:23.59	
20	2	Joceline Wind	Switzerland	4:25.15	
21	2	Lenuta Petronela Simiuc	Romania	4:29.07	

=== Final ===
Rank	Athlete	Nationality	Time	Note
1st place, gold medalist(s)	Laura Muir	Great Britain	4:03.40	
2nd place, silver medalist(s)	Claudia Bobocea	Romania	4:03.76	PB
3rd place, bronze medalist(s)	Sofia Ennaoui	Poland	4:04.06	PB
4	Esther Guerrero	Spain	4:04.86	PB
5	Katie Snowden	Great Britain	4:07.68	
6	Marta Pen Freitas	Portugal	4:07.95	SB
7	Águeda Marqués	Spain	4:08.72	PB
8	Vera Hoffmann	Luxembourg	4:10.03	
9	Sintayehu Vissa	Italy	4:10.05	
10	Hanna Hermansson	Sweden	4.10.48	
11	Ellie Baker	Great Britain	4:10.96	
	Kristiina Mäki	Czech Republic	DNF	
