= 2018 European Athletics Championships – Women's 1500 metres =

Women's 1500 metres at the 2018 European Athletics Championships
- Venue: Olympic Stadium
- Location: Berlin
- Dates: August 10 (round 1); August 12 (final)
- Competitors: 24 from 15 nations
- Winning time: 4:02.32

Medalists
gold medal	Laura Muir	Great Britain
silver medal	Sofia Ennaoui	Poland
bronze medal	Laura Weightman	Great Britain

The women's 1500 metres at the 2018 European Athletics Championships takes place at the Olympic Stadium on 10 and 12 August.

== Records ==
Standing records prior to the 2018 European Athletics Championships
World record	Genzebe Dibaba (ETH)	3:50.07	Monaco	17 July 2015
European record	Tatyana Kazankina (URS)	3:52.47	Zürich, Switzerland	13 August 1980
Championship record	Tatyana Tomashova (RUS)	3:56.91	Gothenburg, Sweden	13 August 2006
World Leading	Genzebe Dibaba (ETH)	3:56.68	Chorzów, Poland	8 June 2018
European Leading	Sifan Hassan (NED)	3:57.41	London, Great Britain	22 July 2018

== Schedule ==
Date	Time	Round
10 August 2018	12:05	Round 1
12 August 2018	20:38	Final

All times are local times (UTC+2)

== Results ==
=== Round 1 ===
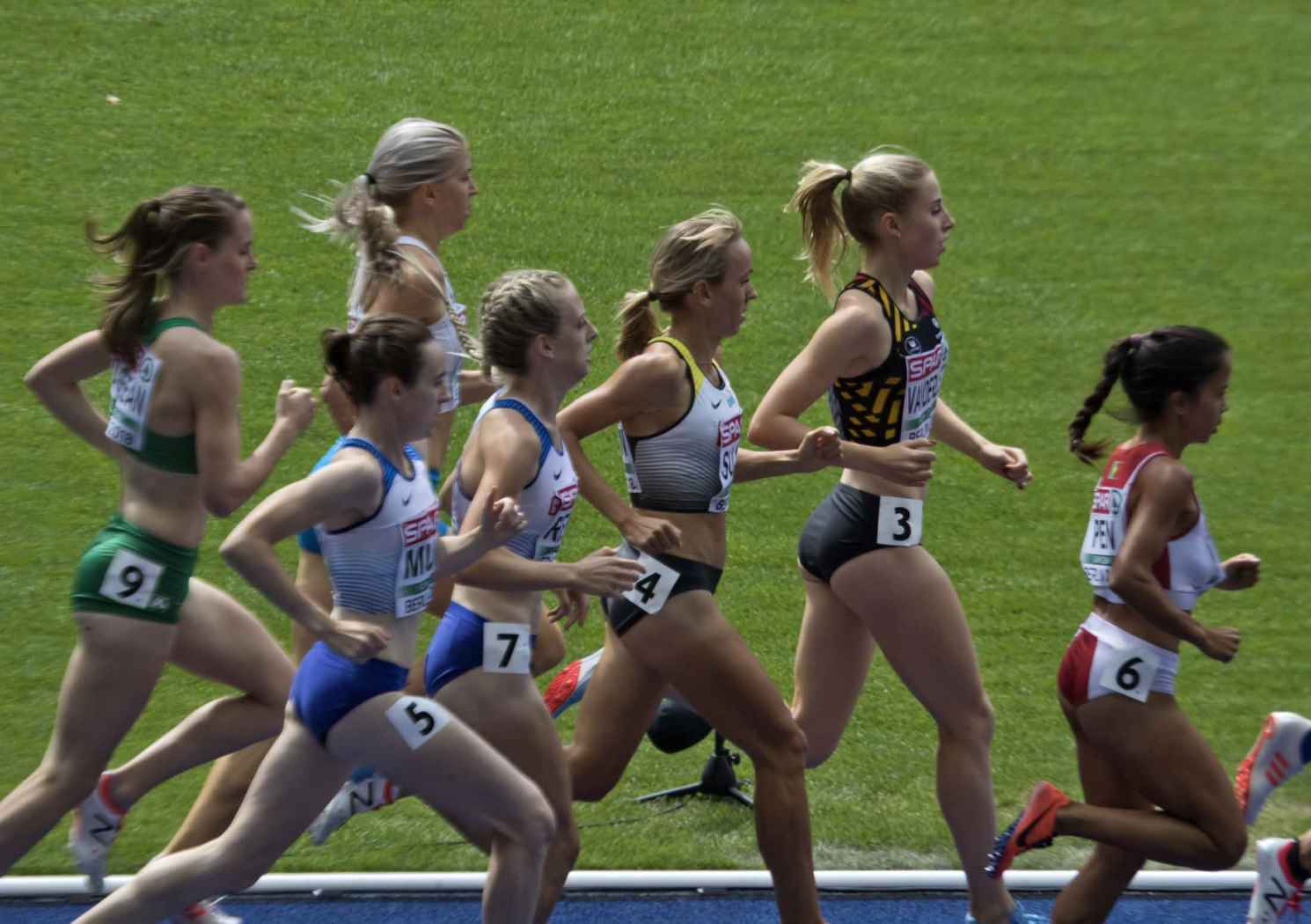
Heat 1

First 4 (Q) and next 4 fastest (q) qualify for the final.

Rank	Heat	Name	Nationality	Time	Note
1	2	Sofia Ennaoui	Poland	4:08.60	Q
2	2	Laura Weightman	Great Britain	4:08.74	Q
3	2	Marta Pérez	Spain	4:08.85	Q
4	2	Hanna Hermansson	Sweden	4:08.98	Q, PB
5	2	Simona Vrzalová	Czech Republic	4:09.11	q
6	1	Laura Muir	Great Britain	4:09.12	Q
7	2	Daryia Barysevich	Belarus	4:09.32	q
8	1	Ciara Mageean	Ireland	4:09.35	Q
9	1	Marta Pen	Portugal	4:09.40	Q
10	2	Diana Mezuliáníková	Czech Republic	4:09.98	q
11	1	Angelika Cichocka	Poland	4:10.04	Q, SB
12	1	Esther Guerrero	Spain	4:10.14	q
13	1	Elise Vanderelst	Belgium	4:10.30	
14	1	Kristiina Mäki	Czech Republic	4:10.35	SB
15	1	Jemma Reekie	Great Britain	4:10.35	
16	2	Solange Pereira	Spain	4:10.63	
17	1	Sara Kuivisto	Finland	4:11.39	
18	2	Caterina Granz	Germany	4:11.46	
19	1	Diana Sujew	Germany	4:12.08	
20	1	Anna Silvander	Sweden	4:12.61	
21	2	Delia Sclabas	Switzerland	4:13.47	
22	1	Claudia Bobocea	Romania	4:16.20	
23	2	Amela Terzić	Serbia	4:17.22	
24	2	Natalia Evangelidou	Cyprus	4:25.91	

=== Final ===
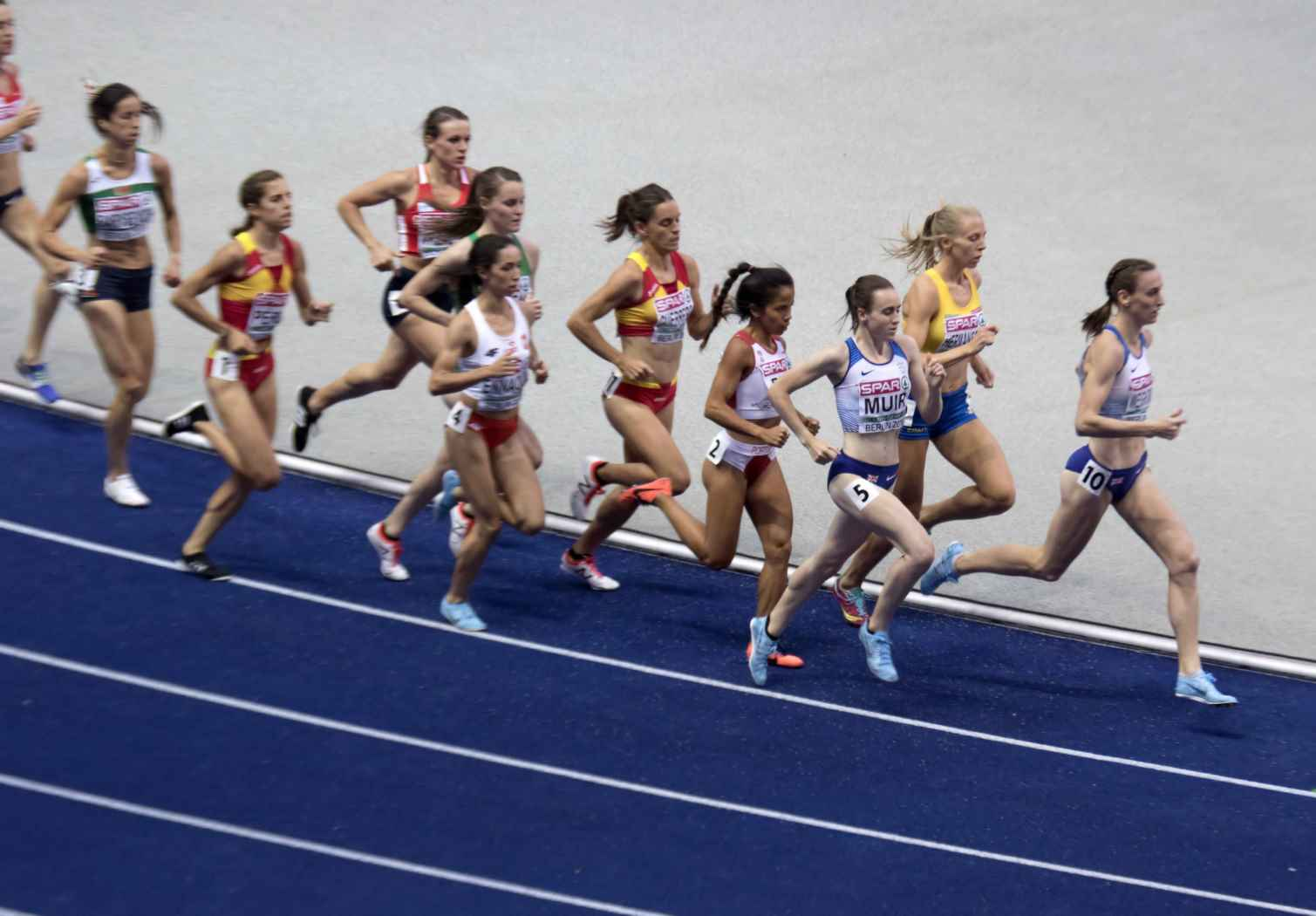
The final

Rank	Name	Nationality	Time	Note
1st place, gold medalist(s)	Laura Muir	Great Britain	4:02.32	
2nd place, silver medalist(s)	Sofia Ennaoui	Poland	4:03.08	
3rd place, bronze medalist(s)	Laura Weightman	Great Britain	4:03.75	
4	Ciara Mageean	Ireland	4:04.63	
5	Simona Vrzalová	Czech Republic	4:06.47	
6	Marta Pen	Portugal	4:06.54	
7	Hanna Hermansson	Sweden	4:07.16	PB
8	Daryia Barysevich	Belarus	4:07.52	
9	Marta Pérez	Spain	4:07.65	
10	Diana Mezuliáníková	Czech Republic	4:07.82	
11	Esther Guerrero	Spain	4:09.88	
12	Angelika Cichocka	Poland	4:10.93	
