= 2021 European Athletics Indoor Championships – Women's 1500 metres =

Women's 1500 metres at the 2021 European Athletics Indoor Championships
- Venue: Arena Toruń
- Location: Toruń, Poland
- Dates: 5 March 2021 (round 1); 6 March 2021 (final)
- Competitors: 22 from 13 nations
- Winning time: 4:18.44

Medalists
gold medal	Elise Vanderelst	Belgium
silver medal	Holly Archer	Great Britain
bronze medal	Hanna Klein	Germany

The women's 1500 metres event at the 2021 European Athletics Indoor Championships was held on 5 March 2021 at 12:22 (heats), and on 6 March at 19:50 (final) local time. The event was won by Belgium's Elise Vanderelst in a time of 4:18.44 minutes.

In the final Spain's Águeda Marqués and Great Britain's Holly Archer were initially disqualified for jostling. Archer had her disqualification overturned on appeal and won the silver medal.

== Records ==
Standing records prior to the 2021 European Athletics Indoor Championships
World record	Gudaf Tsegay (ETH)	3:53.09	Liévin, France	9 February 2021
European record	Abeba Aregawi (SWE)	3:57.91	Stockholm, Sweden	6 February 2014
Championship record	Laura Muir (GBR)	4:02.39	Belgrade, Serbia	4 March 2017
World Leading	Gudaf Tsegay (ETH)	3:53.09	Liévin, France	9 February 2021
European Leading	Laura Muir (GBR)	3:59.58	Liévin, France	9 February 2021

== Results ==
=== Heats ===
Qualification: First 2 in each heat (Q) and the next 3 fastest (q) advance to the Final.

Rank	Heat	Athlete	Nationality	Time	Note
1	3	Hanna Klein	Germany	4:09.35	Q
2	1	Holly Archer	Great Britain	4:09.77	Q, PB
3	1	Gesa Felicitas Krause	Germany	4:09.92	Q, SB
4	3	Águeda Marqués	Spain	4:09.94	Q, PB
5	1	Elise Vanderelst	Belgium	4:10.49	q
6	3	Katie Snowden	Great Britain	4:10.70	q
7	1	Marta Pérez	Spain	4:11.27	q
8	1	Diana Mezuliáníková	Czech Republic	4:11.48	PB
9	3	Martyna Galant	Poland	4:12.08	
10	2	Daryia Barysevich	Belarus	4:12.11	Q
11	2	Esther Guerrero	Spain	4:12.39	Q
12	1	Federica Del Buono	Italy	4:12.79	SB
13	3	Marta Pen Freitas	Portugal	4:12.95	
14	2	Caterina Granz	Germany	4:13.53	
15	3	Lenuța Simiuc	Romania	4:14.94	PB
16	2	Gaia Sabbatini	Italy	4:17.21	
17	1	Orysya Demyanyuk	Ukraine	4:17.52	
18	2	Claudia Bobocea	Romania	4:18.00	
19	2	Klaudia Kazimierska	Poland	4:18.24	
20	2	Lindsey De Grande	Belgium	4:18.45	
21	3	Anastasia-Panayiota Marinakou	Greece	4:19.60	SB
22	3	Vera Hoffmann	Luxembourg	4:20.50	

=== Final ===
Rank	Name	Nationality	Time	Notes
1st place, gold medalist(s)	Elise Vanderelst	Belgium	4:18.44	
2nd place, silver medalist(s)	Holly Archer	Great Britain	4:19.91	
3rd place, bronze medalist(s)	Hanna Klein	Germany	4:20.07	
4	Marta Pérez	Spain	4:20.39	
5	Esther Guerrero	Spain	4:20.45	
6	Katie Snowden	Great Britain	4:21.81	
7	Daryia Barysevich	Belarus	4:22.98	
8	Gesa Felicitas Krause	Germany	4:24.26	
	Águeda Marqués	Spain	DQ	
