= 2022 European Athletics Championships – Women's 1500 metres =

Women's 1500 metres at the 2022 European Athletics Championships
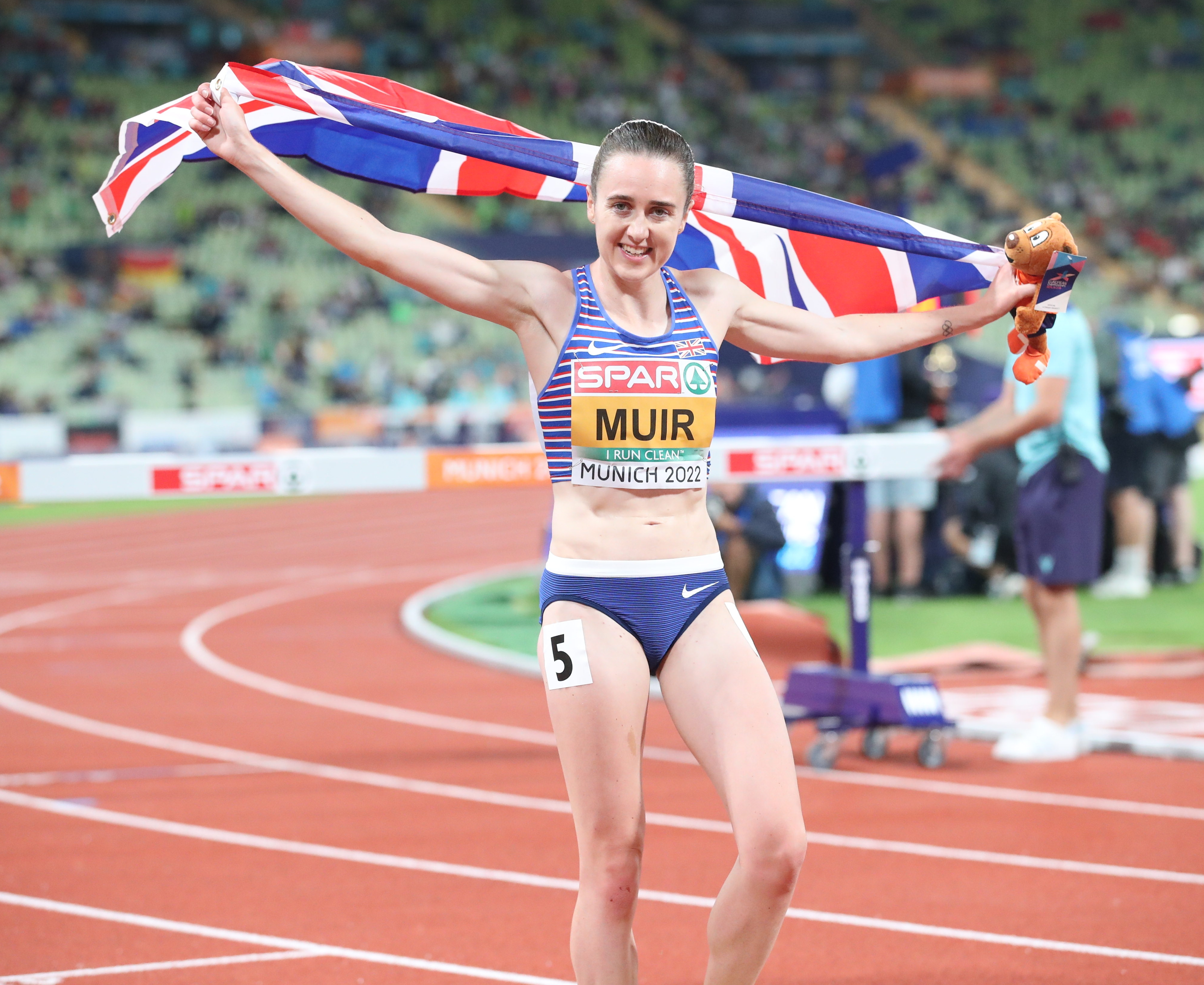
- Venue: Olympiastadion
- Location: Munich
- Dates: 16 August (heats); 19 August (final)
- Competitors: 27 from 15 nations
- Winning time: 4:01.08

Medalists
gold medal	Laura Muir	Great Britain
silver medal	Ciara Mageean	Ireland
bronze medal	Sofia Ennaoui	Poland

The women's 1500 metres at the 2022 European Athletics Championships took place at the Olympiastadion on 16 and 19 August.

== Records ==
Standing records prior to the 2022 European Athletics Championships
World record	Genzebe Dibaba (ETH)	3:50.07	Monaco	17 July 2005
European record	Sifan Hassan (NED)	3:51.95	Doha, Qatar	5 October 2019
Championship record	Tatyana Tomashova (RUS)	3:56.91	Gothenburg, Sweden	13 August 2006
World Leading	Faith Kipyegon (KEN)	3:50.37	Monaco	10 August 2022
Europe Leading	Laura Muir (GBR)	3:55.28	Eugene, Oregon, United States	18 July 2022

== Schedule ==
Date	Time	Round
16 August 2022	10:15	Heats
19 August 2022	20:45	Final

All times are local times (UTC+2)

== Results ==
=== Heats ===
First 4 in each heat (Q) and the next 4 fastest (q) advance to the Final.

Rank	Heat	Lane	Name	Nationality	Time	Note
1	2	7	Sofia Ennaoui	Poland	4:02.73	Q
2	1	6	Ciara Mageean	Ireland	4:03.03	Q, SB
3	2	4	Hanna Klein	Germany	4:03.46	Q, SB
4	3	7	Claudia Bobocea	Romania	4:03.63	Q
5	1	4	Katie Snowden	Great Britain	4:03.76	q, SB
6	2	8	Gaia Sabbatini	Italy	4:04.19	q
7	3	4	Kristiina Mäki	Czech Republic	4:04.40	q
8	3	6	Ellie Baker	Great Britain	4:04.90	q, SB
9	2	3	Yolanda Ngarambe	Sweden	4:05.68	SB
10	3	2	Laura Muir	Great Britain	4:06.40	Q
11	1	5	Ludovica Cavalli	Italy	4:06.59	Q
12	2	5	Hanna Hermansson	Sweden	4:07.08	Q
13	1	7	Katharina Trost	Germany	4:07.20	Q
14	1	3	Marta Pérez Miguel	Spain	4:07.27	
15	2	6	Diana Mezuliáníková	Czech Republic	4:07.37	
16	3	5	Eliza Megger	Poland	4:07.56	
17	2	7	Elise Vanderelst	Belgium	4:07.62	
18	1	8	Águeda Marqués	Spain	4:07.78	
19	3	3	Marta Pen Freitas	Portugal	4:07.82	
20	1	8	Sarah Healy	Ireland	4:07.78	
21	3	3	Aurore Fleury	France	4:07.82	
22	3	3	Nathalie Blomqvist	Finland	4:07.82	
23	3	5	Federica Del Buono	Italy	4:08.14	
24	2	7	Melissa Courtney-Bryant	Great Britain	4:09.11	
25	3	5	Amalie Sæten	Norway	4:15.09	
26	2	7	Ingeborg Østgård	Norway	4:19.36	
27	1	8	Gresa Bakraçi	Kosovo	4:38.10	

=== Final ===
Rank	Name	Nationality	Time	Note
1st place, gold medalist(s)	Laura Muir	Great Britain	4:01.08	
2nd place, silver medalist(s)	Ciara Mageean	Ireland	4:02.56	SB
3rd place, bronze medalist(s)	Sofia Ennaoui	Poland	4:03.59	
4	Katie Snowden	Great Britain	4:04.97	
5	Hanna Klein	Germany	4:05.49	
6	Kristiina Mäki	Czech Republic	4:05.73	
7	Hanna Hermansson	Sweden	4:05.76	PB
8	Ellie Baker	Great Britain	4:05.83	
9	Gaia Sabbatini	Italy	4:06.04	
10	Katharina Trost	Germany	4:06.95	
11	Claudia Bobocea	Romania	4:07.74	
12	Ludovica Cavalli	Italy	4:10.93	
