= 2015 European Athletics Indoor Championships – Women's 3000 metres =

Women's race

The women's 3000 metres event at the 2015 European Athletics Indoor Championships was held on 6 March at 13:25 (heats) and on 7 March at 18:50 (final) local time.

== Medalists ==
Gold	Silver	Bronze
Sviatlana Kudzelich; Belarus	Maureen Koster; Netherlands	Laura Muir; Great Britain

== Results ==
=== Heats ===
Qualification: First 4 of each heat (Q) and the next 4 fastest (q) qualified for the final.

Rank	Heat	Athlete	Nationality	Time	Note
1	1	Maureen Koster	Netherlands	8:57.59	Q
2	1	Laura Muir	Great Britain	8:57.71	Q
3	1	Maruša Mišmaš	Slovenia	8:57.96	Q, PB
4	1	Sandra Eriksson	Finland	8:57.97	Q, PB
5	1	Sviatlana Kudzelich	Belarus	8:57.97	q
6	1	Charlotta Fougberg	Sweden	9:01.33	q, PB
7	1	Jennifer Wenth	Austria	9:01.54	q, PB
8	1	Giulia Viola	Italy	9:03.00	q
9	2	Emelia Gorecka	Great Britain	9:03.97	Q, PB
10	2	Sofia Ennaoui	Poland	9:04.29	Q
11	2	Kristiina Mäki	Czech Republic	9:04.72	Q
12	2	Kate Avery	Great Britain	9:05.14	
13	1	Gesa Felicitas Krause	Germany	9:11.01	
14	2	Özlem Kaya	Turkey	9:14.35	
15	1	Amela Terzić	Serbia	9:17.73	SB
16	2	Maren Kock	Germany	9:20.79	
17	2	Claudia Bobocea	Romania	9:27.82	
	2	Sonja Roman	Slovenia	DNF	
DQ	2	Yelena Korobkina	Russia	~~9:04.22~~	Doping

=== Final ===
Rank	Athlete	Nationality	Time	Note
1st place, gold medalist(s)	Sviatlana Kudzelich	Belarus	8:48.02	PB
2nd place, silver medalist(s)	Maureen Koster	Netherlands	8:51.64	
3rd place, bronze medalist(s)	Laura Muir	Great Britain	8:52.44	
4	Sandra Eriksson	Finland	8:54.06	NR
5	Sofia Ennaoui	Poland	8:56.77	
6	Giulia Viola	Italy	8:59.04	
7	Maruša Mišmaš	Slovenia	8:59.51	
8	Jennifer Wenth	Austria	8:59.84	PB
9	Kristiina Mäki	Czech Republic	9:05.95	
10	Charlotta Fougberg	Sweden	9:06.50	
11	Emelia Gorecka	Great Britain	9:06.79	
DQ	Yelena Korobkina	Russia	~~8:47.62~~	Doping
