= 2017 World Championships in Athletics – Women's 1500 metres =

Women's 1500 metres at the 2017 World Championships
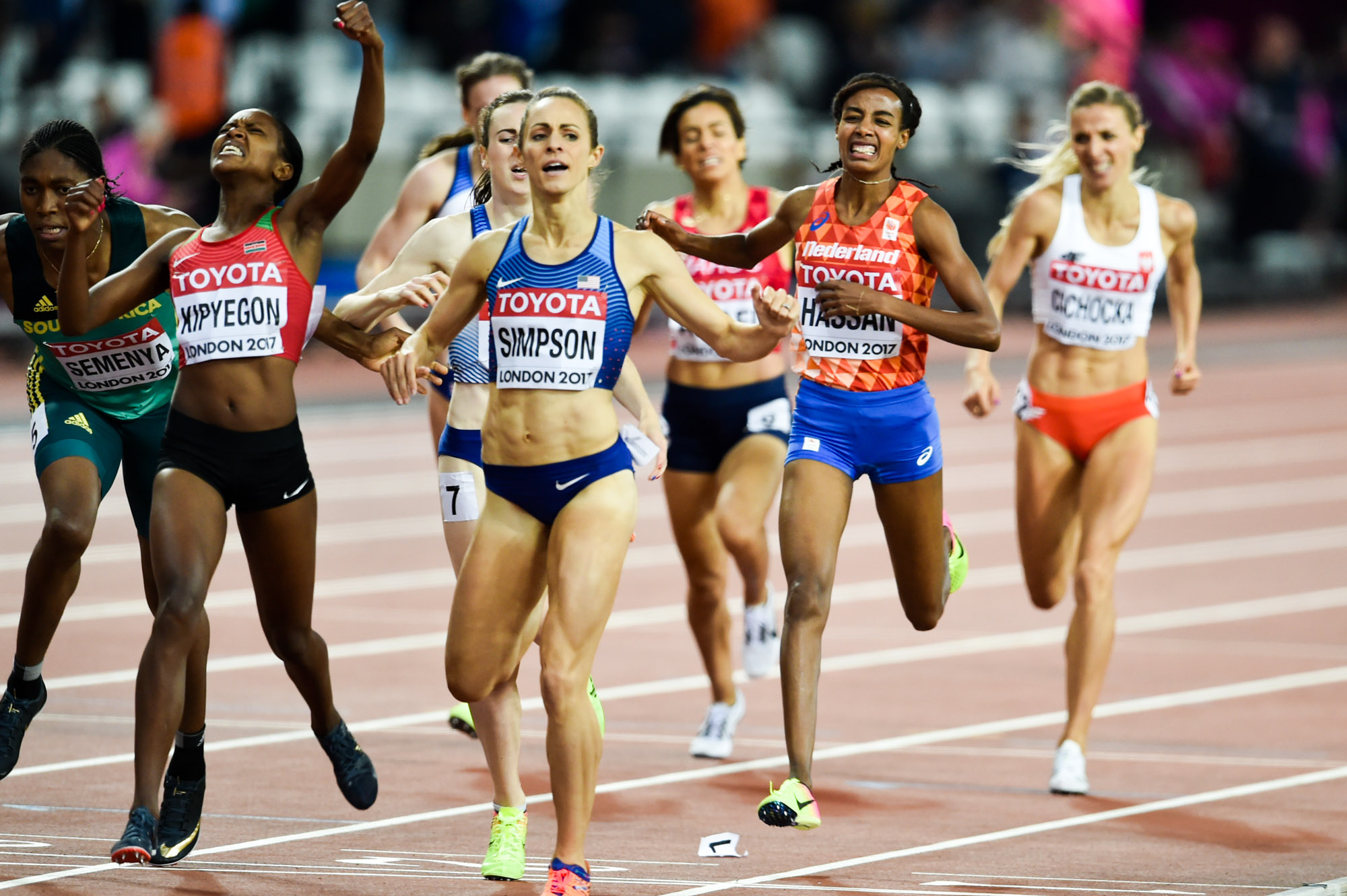
- The finish of the final.
- Venue: Olympic Stadium
- Dates: 4 August (heats); 5 August (semifinal); 7 August (final)
- Competitors: 44 from 26 nations
- Winning time: 4:02.59

Medalists
gold medal	Faith Kipyegon	Kenya
silver medal	Jennifer Simpson	United States
bronze medal	Caster Semenya	South Africa

Video on YouTube Official Video

The women's 1500 metres at the 2017 World Championships in Athletics was held at the London Olympic Stadium on 4−5 and 7 August.

== Summary ==
In the final Laura Muir (Great Britain) made her way to the front to set the early pace, marked closely by the Olympic champion Faith Kipyegon (Kenya). After a 2:17 first 800 metres, Kipyegon took the lead. After running at the back of the pack, marking world record holder Genzebe Dibaba (Ethiopia), Sifan Hassan (Netherlands) ran around the field into the lead. who lead until the final straight, when Kipyegon regained the lead. Hassan held the lead into the final lap, with Kipyegon on her shoulder. Hassan would not let Kipyegon by, keeping her on the outside. Muir tried to stay on the back of the leaders, with Dibaba temporarily joining. Jennifer Simpson and 800 metre star Caster Semenya rushed to keep up, while Dibaba disappeared from contention. Sprinting the entire last lap, Hassan held the lead until the final straightaway when Kipyegon was able to edge ahead. Hassan began to struggle as Muir tried to chase Kipyegon on the outside. Simpson was sprinting down the inside rail while Semenya was behind her but free from traffic on the far outside. Simpson had nowhere to go until Hassan drifted to the outside of the first lane, opening a small gap which Simpson squeezed through. Now with clear running room, Simpson ran past Muir just a few meters before the line to get silver, just behind Kipyegon. On the outside, a step behind Simpson's rush, Semenya dived at the line to nip Muir for the bronze.

== Records ==
Before the competition records were as follows:

Record	Perf.	Athlete	Nat.	Date	Location
World	3:50.07	Genzebe Dibaba	ETH	17 Jul 2015	Fontvieille, Monaco
Championship	3:58.52	Tatyana Tomashova	RUS	31 Aug 2003	Paris, France
World leading	3:56.14	Sifan Hassan	NED	11 Jun 2017	Hengelo, Netherlands
African	3:50.07	Genzebe Dibaba	ETH	17 Jul 2015	Fontvieille, Monaco
Asian	3:50.46	Qu Yunxia	CHN	11 Sep 1993	Beijing, China
NACAC	3:56.29	Shannon Rowbury	USA	17 Jul 2015	Fontvieille, Monaco
South American	4:05.67	Letitia Vriesde	SUR	31 Aug 1991	Tokyo, Japan
European	3:52.47	Tatyana Kazankina	URS	13 Aug 1980	Zürich, Switzerland
Oceanian	4:00.93	Sarah Jamieson	AUS	25 Jul 2006	Stockholm, Sweden

No records were set at the competition.

== Qualification standard ==
The standard to qualify automatically for entry was 4:07.50.

== Schedule ==
The event schedule, in local time (UTC+1), was as follows:

Date	Time	Round
4 August	19:35	Heats
5 August	19:35	Semifinals
7 August	21:50	Final

== Results ==
=== Heats ===
The first round took place on 4 August in three heats as follows:

Heat	1	2	3
Start time	19:35	19:48	20:01
Photo finish	link	link	link

The first six in each heat ( Q ) and the next six fastest ( q ) qualified for the semifinals. The overall results were as follows:

Rank	Heat	Name	Nationality	Time	Notes
1	1	Genzebe Dibaba	Ethiopia	4:02.67	Q
2	1	Caster Semenya	South Africa	4:02.84	Q, SB
3	3	Faith Kipyegon	Kenya	4:03.09	Q
4	1	Winny Chebet	Kenya	4:03.19	Q
5	3	Meraf Bahta	Sweden	4:03.23	Q
6	1	Angelika Cichocka	Poland	4:03.27	Q
7	3	Sofia Ennaoui	Poland	4:03.35	Q, SB
8	3	Laura Weightman	Great Britain & N.I.	4:03.50	Q
9	3	Besu Sado	Ethiopia	4:03.55	Q
10	3	Konstanze Klosterhalfen	Germany	4:03.60	Q
11	1	Rababe Arafi	Morocco	4:03.67	Q
12	1	Jessica Judd	Great Britain & N.I.	4:03.73	Q, PB
13	3	Gabriela Stafford	Canada	4:04.55	q, PB
14	3	Sara Vaughn	United States	4:04.56	q, PB
15	1	Kate Grace	United States	4:04.76	q
16	1	Nicole Sifuentes	Canada	4:05.24	q, SB
17	1	Zoe Buckman	Australia	4:05.44	q
18	3	Sarah McDonald	Great Britain & N.I.	4:05.48	q, PB
19	1	Fantu Worku	Ethiopia	4:05.81	PB
20	1	Marta Pérez	Spain	4:05.82	PB
21	3	Solange Pereira	Spain	4:06.63	
22	1	Amela Terzić	Serbia	4:08.55	
23	2	Sifan Hassan	Netherlands	4:08.89	Q
24	2	Jennifer Simpson	United States	4:08.92	Q
25	2	Gudaf Tsegay	Ethiopia	4:08.96	Q
26	2	Laura Muir	Great Britain & N.I.	4:08.97	Q
27	3	Georgia Griffith	Australia	4:08.99	
28	2	Malika Akkaoui	Morocco	4:09.05	Q
29	3	Margherita Magnani	Italy	4:09.15	
30	2	Hanna Klein	Germany	4:09.32	Q
31	2	Karoline Bjerkeli Grøvdal	Norway	4:09.56	
32	2	Marta Pen Freitas	Portugal	4:10.22	
33	2	Linden Hall	Australia	4:10.51	
34	1	Ciara Mageean	Ireland	4:10.60	
35	2	Claudia Bobocea	Romania	4:11.20	
36	3	Muriel Coneo	Colombia	4:11.98	SB
37	2	Meryem Akda	Turkey	4:12.51	
38	2	Sheila Reid	Canada	4:13.12	
39	2	Judy Kiyeng	Kenya	4:13.65	
40	2	Esther Chebet	Uganda	4:14.12	
41	3	Tamara Amroush	Jordan	4:21.81	
42	2	Eliane Saholinirina	Madagascar	4:23.56	SB
43	3	Angelina Nadi	Athlete Refugee Team	4:33.54	PB
	1	Simona Vrzalová	Czech Republic	DNF	

=== Semifinals ===
The semifinals took place on 5 August in two heats as follows:

Heat	1	2
Start time	19:35	19:47
Photo finish		

The first five in each heat ( Q ) and the next two fastest ( q ) qualified for the final. The overall results were as follows:

Rank	Heat	Name	Nationality	Time	Notes
1	1	Faith Kipyegon	Kenya	4:03.54	Q
2	1	Laura Muir	Great Britain & N.I.	4:03.64	Q
3	2	Sifan Hassan	Netherlands	4:03.77	Q
4	1	Caster Semenya	South Africa	4:03.80	Q
5	1	Angelika Cichocka	Poland	4:03.96	Q
6	2	Meraf Bahta	Sweden	4:04.04	Q
7	1	Hanna Klein	Germany	4:04.45	Q
8	1	Genzebe Dibaba	Ethiopia	4:05.33	q
9	2	Jennifer Simpson	United States	4:05.40	Q
10	2	Laura Weightman	Great Britain & N.I.	4:05.63	Q
11	2	Malika Akkaoui	Morocco	4:05.73	Q
12	1	Rababe Arafi	Morocco	4:05.75	q
13	2	Sofia Ennaoui	Poland	4:05.80	
14	1	Zoe Buckman	Australia	4:05.93	
15	2	Winny Chebet	Kenya	4:06.29	
16	2	Konstanze Klosterhalfen	Germany	4:06.58	
17	2	Sarah McDonald	Great Britain & N.I.	4:06.73	
18	2	Sara Vaughn	United States	4:06.83	
19	2	Besu Sado	Ethiopia	4:07.65	
20	1	Nicole Sifuentes	Canada	4:07.92	
21	2	Gabriela Stafford	Canada	4:08.51	
22	1	Jessica Judd	Great Britain & N.I.	4:10.14	
23	1	Kate Grace	United States	4:16.70	
24	1	Gudaf Tsegay	Ethiopia	4:22.01	

=== Final ===
The final took place on 7 August at 21:53. The results were as follows (photo finish):

Rank	Name	Nationality	Time	Notes
1st place, gold medalist(s)	Faith Kipyegon	Kenya	4:02.59	
2nd place, silver medalist(s)	Jennifer Simpson	United States	4:02.76	
3rd place, bronze medalist(s)	Caster Semenya	South Africa	4:02.90	
4	Laura Muir	Great Britain & N.I.	4:02.97	
5	Sifan Hassan	Netherlands	4:03.34	
6	Laura Weightman	Great Britain & N.I.	4:04.11	
7	Angelika Cichocka	Poland	4:04.16	
8	Rababe Arafi	Morocco	4:04.35	
9	Meraf Bahta	Sweden	4:04.76	
10	Malika Akkaoui	Morocco	4:05.87	
11	Hanna Klein	Germany	4:06.22	
12	Genzebe Dibaba	Ethiopia	4:06.72	
