= Laura Weightman =

English middle-distance runner

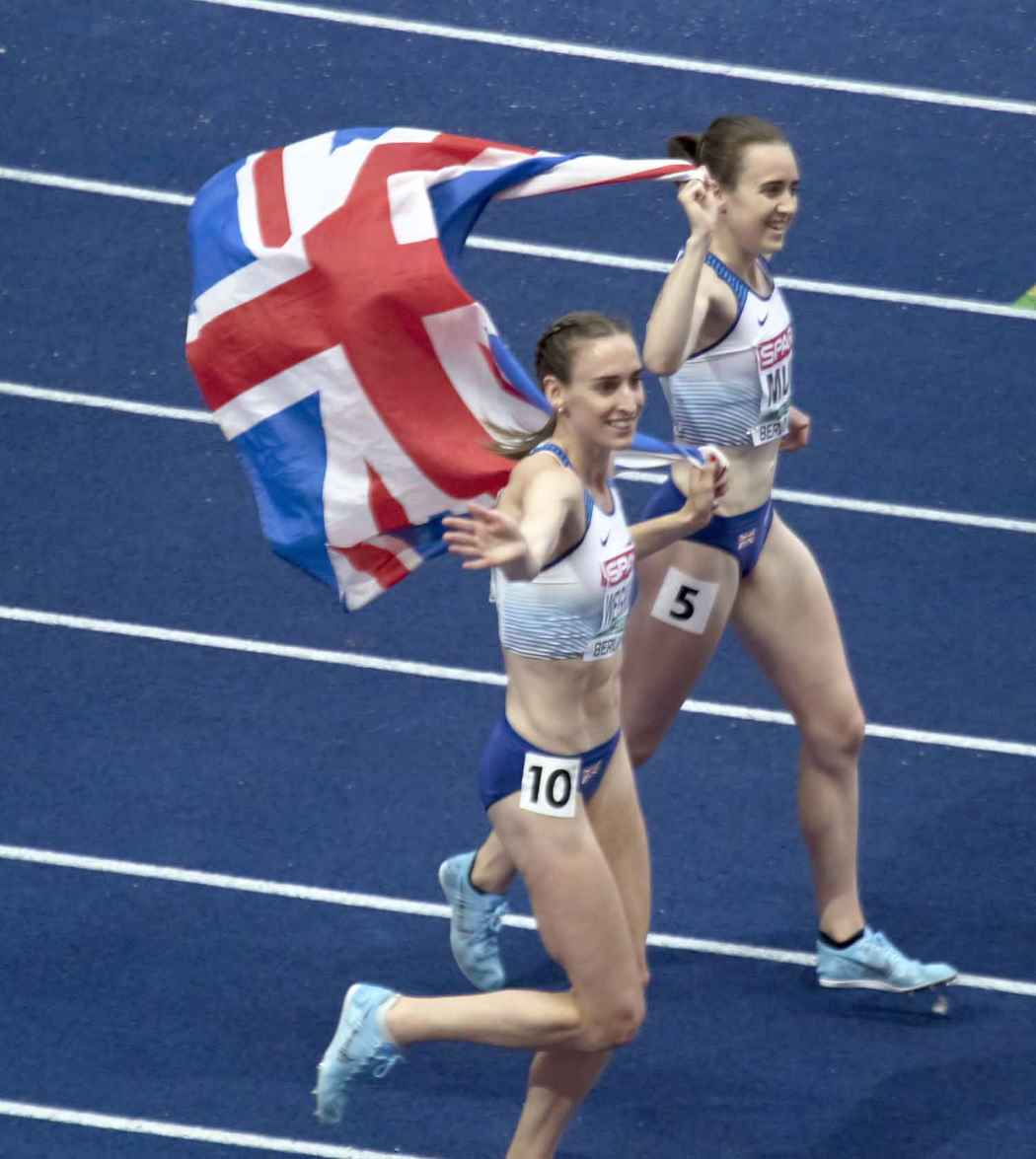
- Weightman (front) with Laura Muir (back) at the 2018 European Championships.

Personal information
- Born: 1 July 1991 (age 34) Alnwick, Northumberland, England
- Height: 1.71 m (5 ft 7 1/2 in)
- Weight: 56 kg (123 lb) (2014)

Sport
- Country: Great Britain; England
- Sport: Athletics
- Event: Middle distance
- Club: Morpeth Harriers
- Turned pro: 2010
- Coached by: Steve Cram
- Retired: 2023
Medal record
Women's athletics
Representing Great Britain
European Championships
Bronze medal – third place	2014 Zürich	1500 m
Bronze medal – third place	2018 Berlin	1500 m
Representing England
Commonwealth Games
Silver medal – second place	2014 Glasgow	1500 m
Bronze medal – third place	2018 Gold Coast	5000 m

Laura Weightman (born 1 July 1991) is a former British middle-distance runner. She reached the 1500 metres final at the 2012 London Olympics and the 2016 Rio Olympics. She won a silver medal at the 2014 Commonwealth Games and bronze medals at the 2014 and 2018 European Championships. She also won a bronze medal in the 5000 metres at the 2018 Commonwealth Games.

== Early life and education ==
Weightman was born on 1 July 1991 in Alnwick, Northumberland, England, where she was educated at The Duchess's Community High School. In May 2013, she graduated with a Sport and Exercise Science degree from Leeds Metropolitan University.

== Career ==
Weightman finished sixth in the 1500 metres final at the 2010 IAAF World Junior Championships in Athletics and ended the season with a 1500m best of 4:09.60. She improved this to 4:07.94 in 2011.

At the 2012 Olympic Games in London, Weightman ran a personal best of 4:02.99 in the 1500 metres semi-finals, and went on to finish ninth in the final. In 2013, she ran a 3000 metres best of 8:43.46 in Stretford. She further improved her 1500 metres best to 4:00.17 on 5 July 2014 at the Paris Diamond League. She won a silver medal at the 2014 Commonwealth Games in Glasgow and a bronze medal at the 2014 European Championships in Zurich.

Weightman reached her second Olympic final in 2016, finishing 11th at the Olympic Games in Rio. She finished sixth in the 1500m final at the 2017 World Championships in London. She won bronze medals in the 5000 metres at the 2018 Commonwealth Games and in the 1500m at the 2018 European Championships in Berlin. After running a personal best of 4:20.49 for the mile in 2018, she improved to 4:17.60 in 2019, a time that moved her into the world all-time top 25.

During her career, Weightman was coached by Steve Cram and Mike Bateman (Morpeth Harriers).

She became a five times British champion when winning the 1500 metres event at the 2020 British Athletics Championships in a time of 4 min 09.76 secs.

Weightman announced her retirement from athletics in September 2023. Weightman will continue to coach distance runners at her club in the UK.

== Statistics ==
=== Competition record ===
Representing Great Britain / England
Year	Competition	Venue	Position	Event	Notes
2010	World Junior Championships	Moncton, Canada	6th	1500 m	4:14.31
2012	Olympic Games	London, United Kingdom	7th	1500 m	4:15.60
2013	European Team Championships	Gateshead, United Kingdom	2nd	3000 m	9:03.11
2014	Commonwealth Games	Glasgow, United Kingdom	2nd	1500 m	4:09.24
2014	European Championships	Zurich, Switzerland	3rd	1500 m	4:06.32
2015	World Championships	Beijing, China	DNS (sf)	1500 m	4:06.13 (h)
2016	Olympic Games	Rio de Janeiro, Brazil	11th	1500 m	4:14.95
2017	World Championships	London, United Kingdom	6th	1500 m	4:04.11
2018	Commonwealth Games	Gold Coast, Australia	3rd	5000 m	15:25.84
2018	European Championships	Berlin, Germany	3rd	1500 m	4:03:75
2019	World Championships	Doha, Qatar	7th	5000 m	14:44.57

=== Personal bests ===
Event	Time	Venue	Date
800 metres	2:01.87	Stretford, United Kingdom	25 July 2017
1500 metres	4:00.09	Berlin, Germany	13 September 2020
Mile	4:17.60	Monaco	12 July 2019
3000 metres	8:26.07	Stanford, CA, United States	30 June 2019
5000 meters	14:35.44	Monaco	14 Aug 2020

- All information taken from IAAF profile.
