= Sintayehu Vissa =

Ethiopian-born Italian distance runner

Sinta Vissa
Personal information
- Full name: Sintayehu Vissa
- Nationality: Italian
- Born: 29 July 1996 (age 29) Bahir Dar, Ethiopia
- Home town: Bertiolo, Italy
- Education: University of Mississippi; Giacomo Ceconi High School
- Employer: On Running
- Height: 1.68 m (5 ft 6 in)

Sport
- Country: Italy
- Sport: Track, Cross country
- Events: Middle-distance running, 5000 metres
- College team: Ole Miss Rebels
- Club: On Athletic Club
- Turned pro: 2022
- Coached by: Dathan Ritzenhein; 2022–present Ryan Vanhoy; 2020–22

Achievements and titles
- Personal bests: 800 m: 2:01.06 (Gainesville 2022); 1500 m: 3:58.11 (Paris 2024) NR; Mile: 4:28.28 (Zagreb 2022); 5000 m: 15:56.86 (Oxford 2022); Indoors; 1500 m: 4:07.14i+ (New York 2023); Mile: 4:24.54i NR (New York 2023)
Medal record
Representing Italy
European Cross Country Championships
Gold medal – first place	2024 Antalya	Mixed relay

Sintayehu Vissa (born 29 July 1996) is an Ethiopian-born Italian professional middle-distance runner. She represented Italy at 2023 & 2022 World Athletics Championships competing in the women's 1500 metres.

Sinta Vissa is the 2022 NCAA Division I 1500 m champion. She is the Italian indoor record holder for the mile.

== Professional ==
In August 2022, Sinta Vissa signed a professional contract to be coached by Dathan Ritzenhein and train with On Athletics Club.

On 28 January 2023, she broke by 0.19 s Gabriella Dorio's 41-year-old Italian indoor mile record with a time of 4:28.71 at the NYRR Dr Sander Invitational in Fort Washington Avenue Armory. Vissa smashed her own record a few weeks later, running 4:24.54 at the Millrose Games in New York for sixth place.

Sintayehu Vissa ran an Italian outdoor 1500 metres record with a time of 3:58.11 at the 2024 Paris Olympic Games where she placed 16th.

== Competition record ==
Representing Italy
Year	Competition	Venue	Position	Event	Notes
2022	World Championships	Eugene, OR, United States	22nd	1500 m	4:07.33
2023	World Championships	Budapest, Hungary	25th	1500 m	4:01.66
2023	2023 European Athletics Team Championships First Division	Chorzów, Poland	4th	1500 m	4:12.62
2023	European Indoor Championships	Istanbul, Turkey	9th	1500 m	4:10.05
2024	European Championships	Rome, Italy	10th (h)	1500 m	4:11.22
2024	Olympic Games	Paris, France	10th (sf)	1500 m	3:58.11 NR
2025	World Indoor Championships	Nanjing, China	14th (h)	1500 m	4:14.25

== NCAA ==
As a Saint Leo Lions, Sintayehu Vissa earned 2019 All-Conference Sunshine State Conference Cross Country honors at the Sunshine State Championships during her first year in the United States from her hometown of Bertiolo, Italy.

She was a 2020 NCAA Division II USTFCCCA 800 metres All-American.

Vissa was a 1500 m champion at 2022 NCAA Division I T&F Championships and earned 5 NCAA Division I U.S. Track & Field and Cross Country Coaches Association All-American awards, 1 NCAA Division II U.S. Track & Field and Cross Country Coaches Association All-American award and 3 Southeastern Conference Championship titles as an Ole Miss Rebels. She ran a 4:04.64 1500 m in Castellón in June, the No. 4 time ever on the USTFCCCA all-time list.

Year	Competition	Venue	Position	Event	Notes
Representing Ole Miss Rebels
2022	NCAA Division I Championships	University of Oregon	1st	1500 m	4:09.42
2022	SEC Outdoor Track and Field Championships	University of Mississippi	1st	1500 m	4:08.72
2022	SEC Outdoor Track and Field Championships	University of Mississippi	5th	5000 m	15:56.86
2022	NCAA Division I Indoor Championships	Birmingham CrossPlex	2nd	Mile	4:35.40
2022	NCAA Division I Indoor Championships	Birmingham CrossPlex	6th	DMR	11:04.86
2022	SEC Indoor Track and Field Championships	Texas A&M University	1st	Mile	4:33.96
2022	SEC Indoor Track and Field Championships	Texas A&M University	1st	DMR	10:56.39
2021	NCAA Division I Cross Country Championships	Florida State University	33rd	6000 m cross country	19:53.2
2021	SEC Cross Country Championships	University of Missouri	6th	6000 m cross country	20:16.7
2021	SEC Outdoor Track and Field Championships	Texas A&M University	4th	800 m	2:06.66
2021	SEC Outdoor Track and Field Championships	Texas A&M University	12th	4 x 400 m relay	3:44.27
2021	NCAA Division I Cross Country Championships	Oklahoma State University–Stillwater	51st	6000 m cross country	21:04.6
2021	NCAA Division I Indoor Championships	University of Arkansas-Fayetteville	8th	DMR	11:07.18
2021	SEC Indoor Championships	University of Alabama	4th	800 m	2:06.97
2021	SEC Indoor Championships	University of Alabama	8th	DMR	11:04.27
Representing Saint Leo Lions
2020	NCAA Division II Indoor Track and Field Championship	Birmingham, Alabama	Cancelled	800 m	2:12.98; Qualification Time
2019	NCAA Division II Cross Country Championship	California State University, Sacramento	157th	6000 m cross country	22:15.5
2019	Sunshine State Cross Country Championships	Boca Raton, Florida	10th	6000 m cross country	23:30.2
