= Marta Pérez (athlete) =

Spanish middle-distance runner

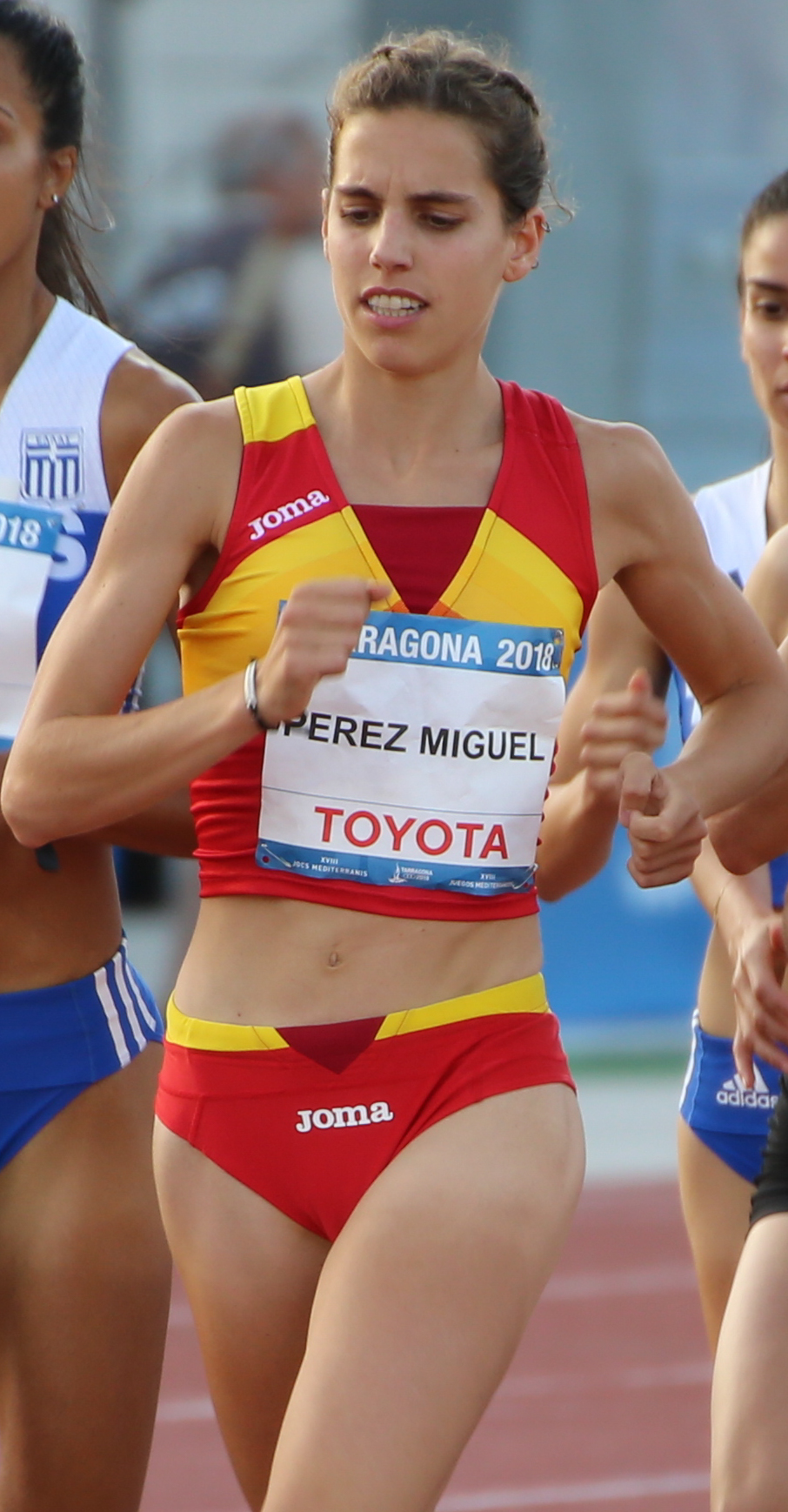
- Pérez in 2018

Personal information
- Full name: Marta Pérez Miguel
- Nationality: Spanish
- Born: 19 April 1993 (age 33) Soria, Spain
- Height: 1.68 m (5 ft 6 in)
- Weight: 56 kg (123 lb)

Sport
- Sport: Middle-distance running
- Event: 1500 metres
Medal record
Women's Athletics
Representing Spain
Mediterranean Games
Bronze medal – third place	2018 Tarragona	1500 m

Marta Pérez Miguel (born 19 April 1993) is a Spanish middle-distance runner who holds the national record in the 1500 meters. She competed in the 2024 Summer Olympics in Paris, running the 1500 meters.

In the first round on Aug. 6, she finished as the last qualifier in Heat 3. She advanced to the semi-final 1500 meter race on Aug. 8. Running in heat 3, she stayed behind the Ethiopian leaders, but ran within reach of the top six. At the final lap, Perez was in 10th place, but kept increasing speed on the backstretch, finishing in eighth with a new national record: 3:57.75. She did not advance, though her countrywoman Águeda Marqués did after finishing sixth in the slower semi-final heat 1.

She also competed for Spain in the women's 1500 metres at the 2017 World Championships in Athletics, and she won bronze in the same event at the 2018 Mediterranean Games.

== International competitions ==
Year	Competition	Venue	Position	Event	Notes
Representing Spain
2012	World Junior Championships	Barcelona, Spain	20th (h)	1500 m	4:23.57
2013	European U23 Championships	Tampere, Finland	15th (h)	1500 m	4:19.74
2015	European U23 Championships	Tallinn, Estonia	7th	1500 m	4:14.21
2016	European Championships	Amsterdam, Netherlands	17th (h)	1500 m	4:17.24
2017	World Championships	London, United Kingdom	21st (h)	1500 m	4:05.82
2018	World Indoor Championships	Birmingham, United Kingdom	12th (h)	1500 m	4:09.90
2018	Mediterranean Games	Tarragona, Spain	3rd	1500 m	4:15.66
2018	European Championships	Berlin, Germany	9th	1500 m	4:07.65
2019	European Indoor Championships	Glasgow, United Kingdom	8th	1500 m	4:13.56
2019	World Championships	Doha, Qatar	11th (sf)	1500 m	4:10.45
2021	European Indoor Championships	Toruń, Poland	4th	1500 m	4:20.39
2021	Olympic Games	Tokyo, Japan	9th	1500 m	4:00.12
2022	World Indoor Championships	Belgrade, Serbia	10th	1500 m	4:10.23
2022	World Indoor Championships	Belgrade, Serbia	16th	3000 m	8:57.81
2022	World Championships	Eugene, United States	11th	1500 m	4:04.25
2022	European Championships	Munich, Germany	19th (h)	1500 m	4:07.82
2023	European Indoor Championships	Istanbul, Turkey	7th	3000 m	8:49.19
2023	World Championships	Budapest, Hungary	18th (sf)	1500 m	4:02.96
2023	World Road Running Championships	Riga, Latvia	6th	Road Mile	4:34.12
2024	World Indoor Championships	Glasgow, United Kingdom	13th (h)	1500 m	4:12.27
2024	European Championships	Rome, Italy	6th	1500 m	4:06.32
2024	Olympic Games	Paris, France	8th (sf)	1500 m	3:57.75
2025	World Championships	Tokyo, Japan	9th	1500 m	3:58.54
