= Aleksandra Płocińska =

Polish athlete (born 1999)

Personal information
- Nationality: Polish
- Born: 5 October 1999 (age 26)

Sport
- Sport: Athletics
- Event: Middle distance running

Achievements and titles
- Personal bests: 1500m: 4:04.04 (Tomblaine, 2024)

Aleksandra Płocińska (born 5 October 1999) is a Polish middle distance runner. In 2023, she became national champion over 1500 metres.

== Career ==
From Piaseczno, she is a member of Piaseczno Kondycja Association.

She became Polish champion over 1500 metres in 2023 in a time of 4:17.98 in Gorzów Wielkopolski. She competed at the 2023 World Athletics Championships in Budapest, where she was did not qualify from the heats.

She ran a personal best time of 4:04.04 in Tomblaine in May 2024. This time placed her twelfth on the Polish all-time list. She reached the final of the 2024 European Athletics Championships in Rome in June 2024. In the final she finished in twelfth place in a time of 4:09.07. She competed in the 1500 metres at the 2024 Summer Olympics in Paris in August 2024.
