= Claudia Bobocea =

Romanian middle-distance runner

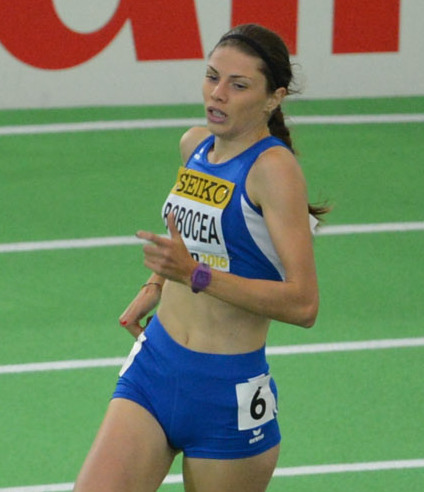
- Bobocea at the 2016 World Indoor Championships in Portland

Personal information
- Full name: Claudia Mihaela Bobocea
- Born: 11 June 1992 (age 34) Bucharest, Romania
- Education: Ovidius University
- Height: 1.76 m (5 ft 9 in)
- Weight: 53 kg (117 lb)

Sport
- Country: Romania
- Sport: Athletics
- Event: 1500 metres
- Club: CSA Steaua București
Medal record
Women's athletics
Representing Romania
European Indoor Championships
Silver medal – second place	2023 Istanbul	1500 m
European Games
Gold medal – first place	2023 Kraków-Małopolska	1500 m

Claudia Mihaela Bobocea (born 11 June 1992) is a Romanian middle-distance runner competing primarily in the 1500 metres. She won the silver medal in the event at the 2023 European Indoor Championships.

Bobocea represented Romania at the 2016 Rio and 2020 Tokyo Olympics. She won multiple national titles both outdoors and indoors (mostly over 800 metres).

In 2025, Bobocea was issued with a two-year ban set to expire in August 2027 for an anti-doping rule violation for whereabouts failures. It was reported in Romanian news that all of her results had been disqualified backdated to August 2023 (the original date of the infraction).

== Statistics ==
=== Competition record ===
Representing Romania
Year	Competition	Venue	Position	Event	Time
2011	European Junior Championships	Tallinn, Estonia	20th (h)	800 m	2:12.90
2013	European U23 Championships	Tampere, Finland	9th	1500 m	4:20.39
2014	World Relays	Nassau, Bahamas	7th	4 × 800 m relay	8:23.12
2014	World Relays	Nassau, Bahamas	4th	4 × 1500 m relay	17:51.48
2015	European Indoor Championships	Prague, Czech Republic	18th (h)	3000 m	9:27.82
2015	European Team Championships, 1st League	Heraklion, Greece	1st	1500 m	4:14.58 PB
2015	Universiade	Gwangju, South Korea	12th	1500 m	4:31.27
2016	World Indoor Championships	Portland, OR, United States	15th (h)	1500 m	4:12.38
2016	Balkan Championships	Pitești, Romania	1st	1500 m	4:16.94
2016	European Championships	Amsterdam, Netherlands	–	800 m	DNF
2016	European Championships	Amsterdam, Netherlands	19th (h)	1500 m	4:18.98
2016	Olympic Games	Rio de Janeiro, Brazil	51st (h)	800 m	2:03.75
2017	European Indoor Championships	Belgrade, Serbia	16th (h)	1500 m	4:16.98
2017	European Team Championships, 1st League	Vaasa, Finland	1st	1500 m	4:14.50
2017	World Championships	London, United Kingdom	35th (h)	1500 m	4:11.20
2017	Universiade	Taipei, Taiwan	11th	1500 m	4:22.85
2018	World Indoor Championships	Birmingham, United Kingdom	25th (h)	1500 m	4:24.60
2018	World Indoor Championships	Birmingham, United Kingdom	13th	3000 m	9:23.70
2018	European Championships	Berlin, Germany	22nd (h)	1500 m	4:16.20
2019	European Indoor Championships	Glasgow, United Kingdom	7th	1500 m	4:13.40
2019	World Championships	Doha, Qatar	24th (sf)	1500 m	4:18.25
2020	Balkan Championships	Cluj-Napoca, Romania	1st	800 m	2:03.32
2020	Balkan Championships	Cluj-Napoca, Romania	1st	1500 m	4:12.95
2021	European Indoor Championships	Toruń, Poland	18th (h)	1500 m	4:18.00
2021	Olympic Games	Tokyo, Japan]	33rd (h)	1500 m	4:09.19
2022	World Indoor Championships	Belgrade, Serbia	9th	1500 m	4:09.64
2022	Balkan Championships	Craiova, Romania	1st	800 m	2:01.84
2022	European Championships	Munich, Germany	11th	1500 m	4:07.74
2023	European Indoor Championships	Istanbul, Turkey	2nd	1500 m	4:03.76 PB
2023	World Championships	Budapest, Hungary	– (h)	800 m	DQ
2023	World Championships	Budapest, Hungary	– (h)	1500 m	DQ
2024	World Indoor Championships	Glasgow, United Kingdom	– (h)	800 m	DQ
2024	World Indoor Championships	Glasgow, United Kingdom	–	1500 m	DQq

=== Personal bests ===
- 800 metres – 2:01.37 (Ostrava 2020)
  - 800 metres indoor – 2:04.58 (Bucharest 2016)
- 1000 metres – 2:42.92 (Bucharest 2015)
  - 1000 metres indoor – 2:35.35 (Birmingham 2023) NR
- 1500 metres – 4:01.10 (Ostrava 2022)
  - 1500 metres indoor – 4:03.76 (Istanbul 2023)
- 3000 metres – 8:55.34 (Osaka 2018)
  - 3000 metres indoor – 8:47.59 (Madrid 2019)

=== National titles ===
- Romanian Athletics Championships
  - 800 metres: 2017, 2018, 2019, 2021, 2022
  - 1500 metres: 2018
  - 4 × 400 m relay: 2017
- Romanian Indoor Athletics Championships
  - 800 metres: 2016, 2018, 2020
  - 1500 metres: 2015
  - 3000 metres: 2015
