= Hanna Klein =

German middle-distance runner

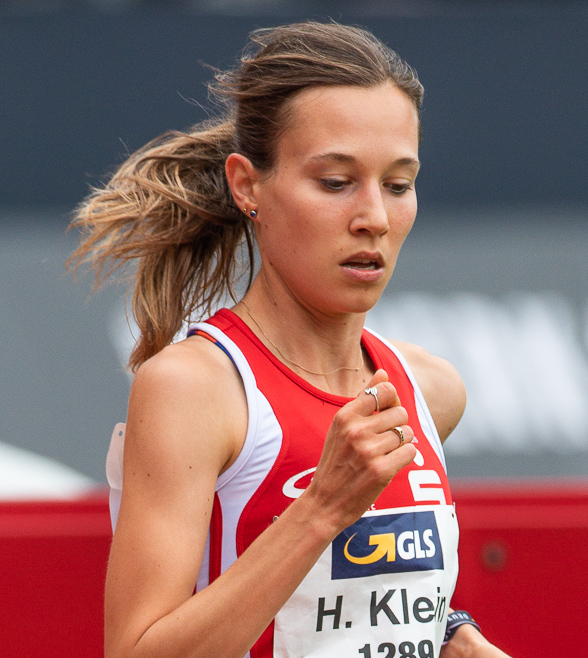
- Klein at the 2018 German Athletics Championships in Nuremberg

Personal information
- Born: 6 April 1993 (age 33) Landau in der Pfalz, Germany
- Height: 1.72 m (5 ft 8 in)

Sport
- Country: Germany
- Sport: Athletics
- Events: Middle-, Long-distance running
- Club: LAV Stadtwerke Tübingen
Medal record
Women's athletics
Representing Germany
European Indoor Championships
Gold medal – first place	2023 Istanbul	3000 m
Bronze medal – third place	2021 Toruń	1500 m
Summer Universiade
Gold medal – first place	2017 Taipei	5000 m
European Cross Country Championships
Gold medal – first place	2022 Turin	Team
Bronze medal – third place	2018 Tilburg	Team

Hanna Klein (born 6 April 1993) is a German middle- and long-distance runner. She won the gold medal in the 3000 metres at the 2023 European Indoor Championships and bronze for the 1500 metres at the 2021 European Indoor Championships. Klein finished fifth in the 1500 m at the 2022 European Championships. She took gold for the 5000 metres at the 2017 Universiade.

Klein won several German national titles outdoors and indoors (1500 m, 5000 m, 3000 m).

== Career ==
Klein finished 11th in both the 1500 metres at the 2017 World Athletics Championships held in London and the 3000 metres at the 2022 World Indoor Championships in Belgrade, Serbia, her highest position at global championships.

After her bronze medal for the 1500 m at the 2021 European Indoor Championships in Toruń, Poland, she secured her first major title with gold for the 3000 m at the 2023 edition in Istanbul. It was the first time in her senior career (since 2015) that she outsprinted compatriot Konstanze Klosterhalfen who earned silver. Klein was beaten by Klosterhalfen to gold at the German Indoor Championships the previous month and their win-loss record stood at 0–10 before.

== Achievements ==
All information from World Athletics profile unless otherwise noted.

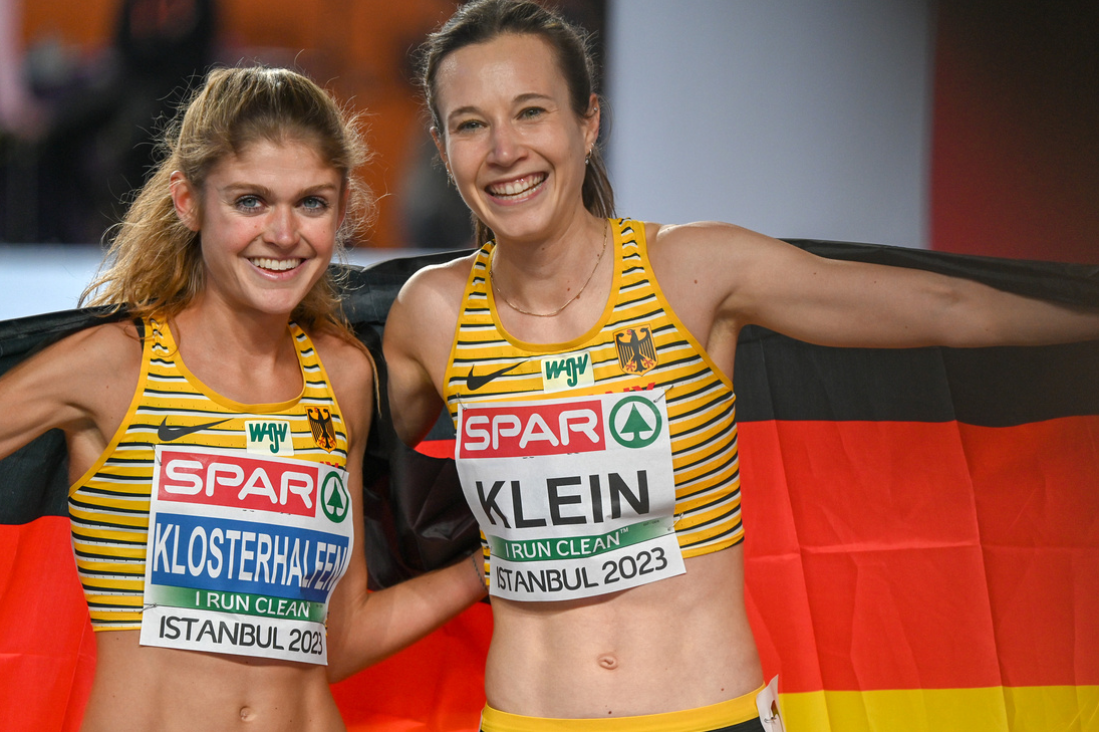
Hanna Klein (R) and Konstanze Klosterhalfen, German 1–2 in the 3000 m at the 2023 European Indoor Championships in Istanbul

=== International competitions ===
Representing Germany
Year	Competition	Venue	Position	Event	Result
2010	European Youth Olympic Trials	Moscow, Russia	5th	1000 m	2:44.55
2010	Youth Olympic Games	Singapore, Singapore	7th (f2)	1000 m	2:51.40
2011	European Junior Championships	Tallinn, Estonia	8th	800 m	2:09.92
2015	European U23 Championships	Tallinn, Estonia	8th	1500 m	4:16.01
2017	European Indoor Championships	Belgrade, Serbia	9th	3000 m i	8:58.57
2017	European Team Championships Super League	Lille, France	2nd	3000 m	9:01.64
2017	World Championships	London, United Kingdom	11th	1500 m	4:06.22
2017	Universiade	Taipei, Taiwan	1st	5000 m	15:45.28
2018	World Indoor Championships	Birmingham, United Kingdom	19th (h)	1500 m i	4:12.11
2018	European Championships	Berlin, Germany	–	5000 m	DNF
2018	European Cross Country Championships	Tilburg, Netherlands	31st	Senior race	27:53
2018	European Cross Country Championships	Tilburg, Netherlands	3rd	Team	50 pts
2019	European Team Championships Super League	Lille, France	1st	5000 m	15:39.00
2019	World Championships	Doha, Qatar	18th (h)	5000 m	15:28.65
2021	European Indoor Championships	Toruń, Poland	3rd	1500 m i	4:20.07
2021	Olympic Games	Tokyo, Japan	39th (h)	1500 m	4:14.83
2022	World Indoor Championships	Belgrade, Serbia	11th	3000 m i	8:48.73
2022	World Championships	Eugene, OR, United States	11th (sf)	1500 m	4:04.62
2022	European Championships	Munich, Germany	5th	1500 m	4:05.49
2022	European Cross Country Championships	Turin, Italy	4th	Senior race	27:19
2022	European Cross Country Championships	Turin, Italy	1st	Team	9 pts
2023	European Indoor Championships	Istanbul, Turkey	1st	3000 m i	8:35.87 PB
2024	European Championships	Rome, Italy	6th	5000 m	14:58.28
2024	Olympic Games	Paris, France	31st (h)	5000 m	15:31.85

=== Personal bests ===
- 800 metres – 2:01.70 (Gillingham 2022)
- 1500 metres – 4:02.58 (Nice 2021)
  - 1500 metres indoor – 4:06.23 (Liévin 2023)
- Mile – 4:23.52 (Zagreb 2022)
- 3000 metres – 8:45.00 (Doha 2019)
  - 3000 metres indoor – 8:35.87 (Istanbul 2023)
- 5000 metres – 14:51.71 (Birmingham 2022)

Road

- 10 kilometres – 31:40 (Uelzen 2021)

=== National titles ===
- German Athletics Championships
  - 1500 metres: 2020, 2021, 2022
  - 5000 metres: 2018
- German Indoor Athletics Championships
  - 1500 metres: 2019, 2020
  - 3000 metres: 2020, 2021, 2022
- German 10 km Road Running Championships
  - 10 kilometres: 2021
