= Hanna Hermansson =

Swedish middle-distance runner

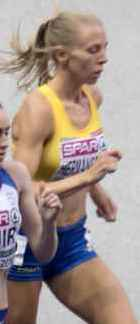
- Hanna Hermansson in 2018

Personal information
- Born: 18 May 1989 (age 37) Stockholm, Sweden
- Education: Marymount California University

Sport
- Sport: Athletics
- Event: 800 metres
- College team: Marymount Mariners
- Club: Valor Track Club

Hanna Hermansson (born 18 May 1989) is a Swedish middle-distance runner. She represented her country in the 800 metres at the 2017 World Championships reaching the semifinals.

== International competitions ==
Year	Competition	Venue	Position	Event	Notes
Representing Sweden
2017	World Championships	London, United Kingdom	12th (sf)	800 m	2:00.43
2018	European Championships	Berlin, Germany	6th (sf)	800 m	2:00.52
2018	European Championships	Berlin, Germany	7th	1500 m	4:07.16
2019	European Indoor Championships	Glasgow, United Kingdom	18th (h)	1500 m	4:19.88
2022	World Championships	Eugene, United States	17th (sf)	1500 m	4:06.70
2022	European Championships	Munich, Germany	7th	1500 m	4:05.76
2023	European Indoor Championships	Istanbul, Turkey	10th	1500 m	4.10.48
2023	World Championships	Budapest, Hungary	35th (h)	1500 m	4:06.42
2024	European Championships	Rome, Italy	20th (h)	1500 m	4:13.34

== Personal bests ==
Outdoor

- 400 metres – 56.24 (Celle Ligure 2017)
- 600 metres – 1:35.9 (Santa Barbara 2015)
- 800 metres – 2:00.43 (London 2017)
- 1000 metres – 2:38.13 (Gothenburg 2017)
- 1500 metres – 4:07.16 (Berlin 2018)
- One mile – 4:59.72 (Claremont 2016)
- 5000 metres – 17:47.30 (Aliso Viejo 2017)

Indoor

- 800 metres – 2:02.80 (New York 2018)
