= Katie Snowden =

British middle-distance runner

- At the 2026 Weltklasse Zürich

Personal information
- Nationality: British
- Born: 9 March 1994 (age 32)

Sport
- Country: Great Britain & N.I. England
- Sport: Athletics
- Event: 1500 metres

Achievements and titles
- Personal best: 1500 m: 3:56.72 (2023)
Medal record
Women's athletics
Representing England
Commonwealth Youth Games
Gold medal – first place	2011 Douglas	800 m

Katie Snowden (born 9 March 1994) is an English middle-distance runner representing England and Great Britain, specialising in the 1500 metres. She finished fourth in the event at the 2022 European Athletics Championships.

Snowden represented Great Britain at the 2020 Summer Olympics in Tokyo.

== Career ==
Katie Snowden won the girls' 800 metres event at the 2011 Commonwealth Youth Games held in Douglas, Isle of Man.

In 2015, she placed sixth in the women's 800 metres at the European Under-23 Championships held in Tallinn, Estonia. Snowden competed in the women's 1500 metres at the 2018 Commonwealth Games held in Gold Coast, Australia.

She finished in sixth place in the women's 1500 metres at the 2021 European Indoor Championships held in Toruń, Poland. Whilst representing Great Britain at the postponed 2020 Summer Olympics in Tokyo, Snowden ran a personal best time of 4:02.77 in the third heat to qualify for the semi-finals of the women's 1500 metres.

In 2023, she became the British 1500 metres champion after winning the title at the 2023 British Athletics Championships.

== Athletic Achievements ==
=== Personal bests ===
Type	Distance	Time (s)	Venue	Date	Notes
Indoor	800 metres sh	2:04.35	Athlone, Ireland	26 February 2014	
Indoor	1000 metres sh	2:37.46	Birmingham, United Kingdom	25 February 2023	
Indoor	1500 metres sh	4:03.98	New York, United States	11 February 2023	
Indoor	Mile sh	4:21.19	New York, United States	11 February 2023	
Indoor	3000 metres sh	8:39.89	Boston, United States	30 January 2026	
Outdoor	800 metres	1:58.00	London, United Kingdom	23 July 2023	
Outdoor	1000 metres	2:35.54	Birmingham, United Kingdom	18 August 2018	
Outdoor	1500 metres	3:56.72	Budapest, Hungary	20 August 2023	
Outdoor	Mile	4:25.72	Zagreb, Croatia	11 September 2022	
Outdoor	3000 metres	8:39.89	Boston, United States	30 January 2026	

=== International competitions ===
Representing Great Britain & England
Year	Competition	Venue	Position	Event	Time	Notes
2011	World Youth Championships	Villeneuve-d'Ascq, France	7th	800 m	2:05.64	
2011	Commonwealth Youth Games	Douglas, Isle of Man	1st	800 m	2:11.20	
2015	European U23 Championships	Tallinn, Estonia	6th	800 m	2:03.45	
2017	European Team Championships Super League	Villeneuve-d'Ascq, France	9th	800 m	2:05.19	
2018	Commonwealth Games	Gold Coast, Australia	11th	1500 m	4:06.55	
2021	European Indoor Championships	Toruń, Poland	6th	1500 m	4:21.81	
2021	Olympic Games	Tokyo, Japan	16th (sf)	1500 m	4:02.93	
2022	World Championships	Eugene, United States	20th (sf)	1500 m	4:08.29	
2022	Commonwealth Games	Birmingham, United Kingdom	7th	1500 m	4:07.15	
2022	European Championships	Munich, Germany	4th	1500 m	4:04.97	
2023	European Indoor Championships	Istanbul, Turkey	5th	1500 m	4:07.68	
2023	World Championships	Budapest, Hungary	8th	1500 m	3:59.65	
2024	European Championships	Rome, Italy	9th	1500 m	4:06.83	
2026	World Indoor Championships	Toruń, Poland	8th	3000 m	9:03.79	
2026	Commonwealth Games	Glasgow, United Kingdom	14th (sf)	Mile	4:33.46	
2026	European Championships	Birmingham, United Kingdom	21st (h)	1500 m	4:11.49	
2026	World Road Running Championships	Copenhagen, Denmark	16th	Road mile	4:33.44	

=== National championships and competitions ===
Year	Competition	Venue	Position	Event	Time
2010	England Indoor Championships, U17 events	Birmingham	2nd	300 m	40.20
2010	England Indoor Championships, U17 events	Birmingham	1st	800 m	2:15.49
2010	England Championships, U17 events	Bedford	1st	400 m	54.59
2011	England Championships, U20 events	Bedford	4th	400 m	54.51
2012	England Championships, U20 events	Bedford	5th	800 m	2:09.15
2013	British Championships	Birmingham	—	800 m	2:06.75
2014	British Indoor Championships	Sheffield	5th	800 m	2:07.60
2014	British Championships	Birmingham	—	800 m	2:04.50
2015	England Championships, U23 events	Bedford	1st	800 m	2:04.68
2016	British Indoor Championships	Sheffield	—	1500 m	DNF
2016	British Championships	Birmingham	—	800 m	2:06.12
2017	British Championships	Birmingham	4th	1500 m	4:09.70
2018	British Indoor Championships	Birmingham	2nd	1500 m	4:15.68
2018	British Championships	Birmingham	4th	1500 m	4:10.86
2019	British Indoor Championships	Birmingham	3rd	1500 m	4:19.34
2020	British Championships	Manchester	3rd	1500 m	4:14.00
2021	British Championships	Manchester	3rd	1500 m	4:08.62
2023	British Indoor Championships	Birmingham	2nd	1500 m	4:06.98
2023	British Championships	Manchester	1st	1500 m	4:09.86
2024	British Championships	Manchester	5th	1500 m	4:12.94
2025	British Championships	Birmingham	6th	1500 m	4:17.73
2026	British Indoor Championships	Birmingham	2nd	3000 m	8:46.09
2026	British Championships	Birmingham	2nd	1500 m	4:08.22
