= Yelena Korobkina =

Russian middle-distance runner

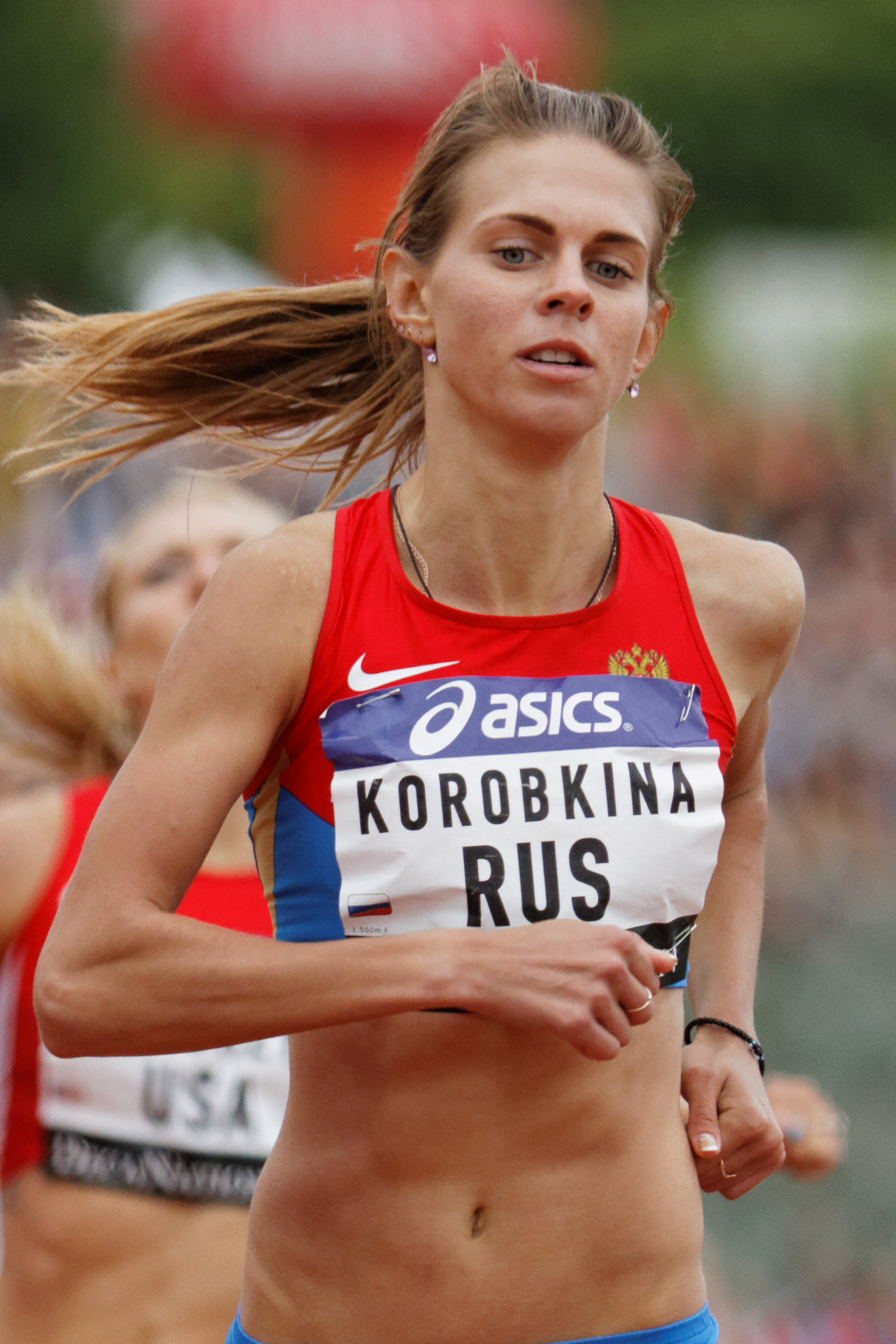
- Yelena Korobkina at DécaNation in 2014

Personal information
- Full name: Yelena Sergeyevna Korobkina
- Born: 25 November 1990 (age 35)
- Height: 1.63 m (5 ft 4 in)

Sport
- Country: Russia
- Sport: Women's athletics
- Event: Middle-distance running
- College team: Russian State University of Physical Education, Sport, Youth and Tourism

Yelena Sergeyevna Korobkina (Russian: Елена Сергеевна Коробкина; born 25 November 1990) is a Russian former distance runner who competed in events from 1500 metres to 10,000 metres.

Korobkina was found guilty of doping offences and banned for four years from September 2023. Her competitive results from July 2013 to July 2016 were all disqualified.

== International competitions ==
Representing Russia
Year	Competition	Venue	Position	Event	Notes
2009	European Junior Championships	Novi Sad, Serbia	1st	3000 m	9:13.35
2011	European Indoor Championships	Paris, France	17th (h)	1500 m	4:13.45
2011	European U23 Championships	Ostrava, Czech Republic	9th	5000 m	16:27.92
2013	European Indoor Championships	Gothenburg, Sweden	4th	3000 m	9:00.59
2013	Universiade	Kazan, Russia	DSQ	1500 m	
2013	World Championships	Moscow, Russia	DSQ	1500 m	
2014	World Indoor Championships	Sopot, Poland	DSQ	1500 m	
2014	European Championships	Zürich, Switzerland	DSQ	5000 m	
2015	European Indoor Championships	Prague, Czech Republic	DSQ	3000 m	
2015	World Championships	Beijing, China	DSQ	5000 m	
