= Laura Muir =

Scottish middle-distance runner (born 1993)

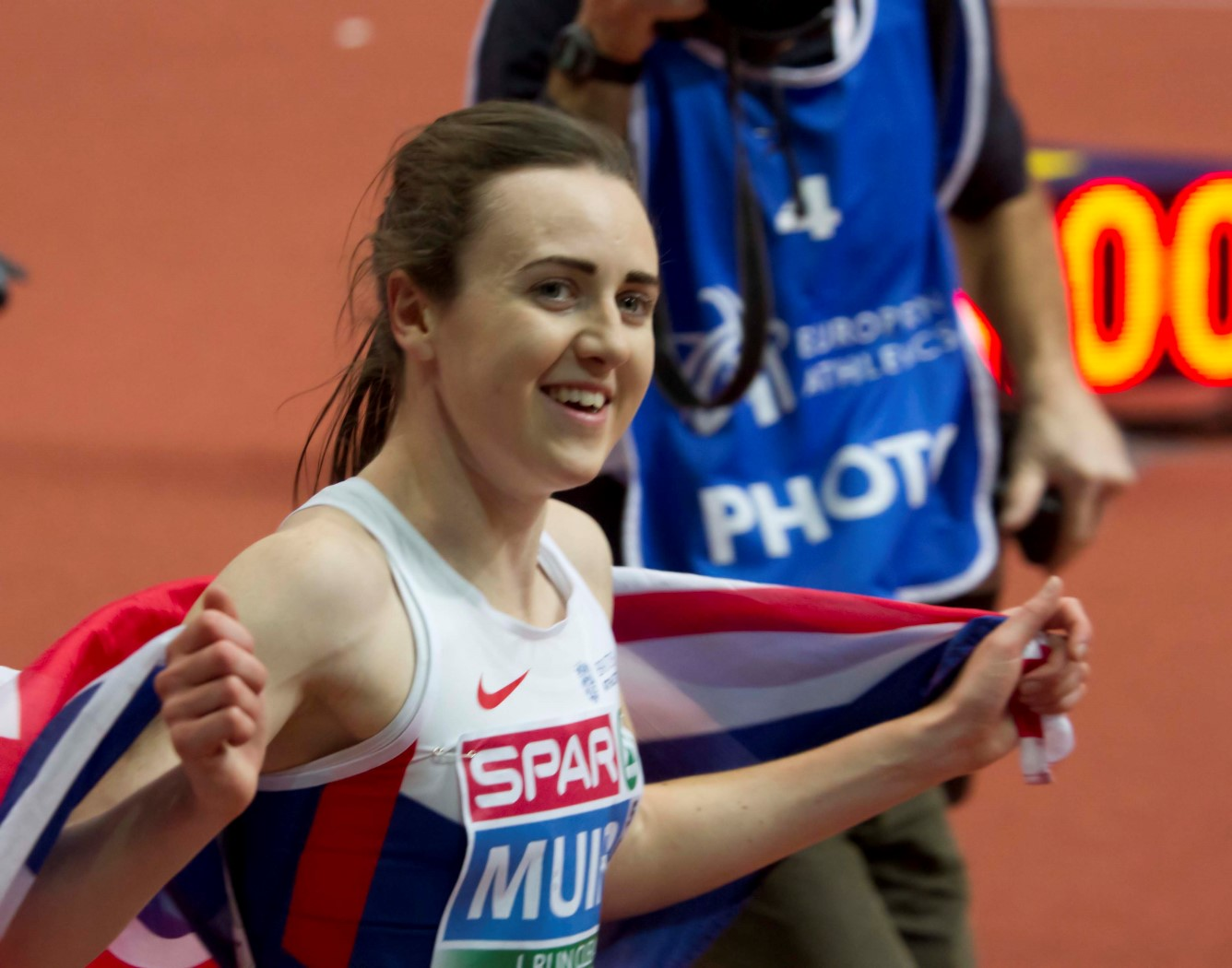
- Muir after her 3000 m win at the 2017 European Indoor Championships in Belgrade

Personal information
- Born: 9 May 1993 (age 33) Inverness, Scotland
- Education: University of Glasgow (2018)
- Height: 1.63 m (5 ft 4 in)
- Weight: 49 kg (108 lb)

Sport
- Country: Great Britain & N.I. Scotland
- Sport: Athletics
- Events: Middle-, Long-distance running
- Club: Dundee Hawkhill Harriers & Glasgow University; Nike
- Coached by: Andy Young (2011–2023); Alan Mackintosh (–2011)

Achievements and titles
- Olympic finals: 2016 Rio de Janeiro; 1500 m, 7th; 2020 Tokyo; 1500 m, Silver; 2024 Paris; 1500 m, 5th
- World finals: 2013 Moscow; 800 m, 9th (sf); 2015 Beijing; 1500 m, 5th; 2017 London; 1500 m, 4th; 5000 m, 6th; 2019 Doha; 1500 m, 5th; 2022 Eugene; 1500 m, Bronze; 2023 Budapest; 1500 m, 6th
- Personal bests: 800 m: 1:56.73 (Monaco 2021); 1000 m: 2:30.82 NR (Monaco 2020); 1500 m: 3:53.37 (Paris 2024); Mile: 4:15.24 NR (Monaco 2023); 3000 m: 8:30.64 (Monaco 2017); 5000 m: 14:48.14 (Paris 2023); Indoors; 800 m: 1:58.44i (Glasgow 2020); 1000 m: 2:31.93i AR (Birmingham 2017); 1500 m: 3:59.58i NR (Liévin 2021); Mile: 4:18.75i (Birmingham 2019); 3000 m: 8:26.41i AR (Karlsruhe 2017); 5000 m: 14:49.12i NR (Glasgow 2017)
Medal record
Women's athletics
Representing Great Britain
Olympic Games
Silver medal – second place	2020 Tokyo	1500 m
World Championships
Bronze medal – third place	2022 Eugene	1500 m
World Indoor Championships
Silver medal – second place	2018 Birmingham	1500 m
Bronze medal – third place	2018 Birmingham	3000 m
Diamond League
First place	2016	1500 m
First place	2018	1500 m
European Championships
Gold medal – first place	2018 Berlin	1500 m
Gold medal – first place	2022 Munich	1500 m
European Indoor Championships
Bronze medal – third place	2015 Prague	3000 m
Gold medal – first place	2017 Belgrade	1500 m
Gold medal – first place	2017 Belgrade	3000 m
Gold medal – first place	2019 Glasgow	1500 m
Gold medal – first place	2019 Glasgow	3000 m
Gold medal – first place	2023 Istanbul	1500 m
European U23 Championships
Bronze medal – third place	2013 Tampere	1500 m
European Cross Country Championships
Gold medal – first place	2015 Hyères	U23 team
Representing Scotland
Commonwealth Games
Gold medal – first place	2022 Birmingham	1500 m
Bronze medal – third place	2022 Birmingham	800 m

Laura Muir (/mjʊər/; born 9 May 1993) is a Scottish middle- and long-distance runner. She is the 2020 Tokyo Olympic silver medallist in the 1500 metres, having previously finished seventh in the event at the 2016 Rio Olympics. Muir won the bronze medal at the 2022 World Championships, and has three other top five placings in 1500 m finals at the World Athletics Championships, finishing fifth in 2015, fourth in 2017 (where she was also sixth in the 5000 metres) and fifth in 2019. She is a two-time European 1500 m champion from 2018 and 2022 as well as the 2022 Commonwealth Games 1500 m champion and 800 metres bronze medallist. Muir is twice the Diamond League champion over 1500 metres, in 2016 and 2018.

Indoors, she is a two-time 2018 World Indoor Championship medallist, earning silver at 1500 m and bronze at 3000 metres, and a British record five-time European Indoor champion, including the 1500 m/3000 m double in 2017 and 2019 as the first athlete in history to achieve the "double-double" at a European Indoor Championships. With Muir's fifth title for the 1500 m in 2023, she became the first ever Brit to claim five golds at the event, increasing her overall tally to seven European titles.

Muir first broke the British record in the 1500 metres in July 2016. She set her last record in 2024 in a Diamond League meeting in Paris, which ranks her in the world all-time top 15, before the record was broken in the Olympic final by Georgia Bell. In 2017, she broke the European indoor records at both the 1000 metres and 3000 metres, and also set a British record for the indoor 5000 metres. Muir added a British record at the 1000 m in 2020, and the next year, she also broke the Scottish record in the 800 metres. Her British record time for the mile run in 2023, ranks her in the world all-time top 10.

Domestically, Muir is a ten-time British champion.

== Early life ==
Born on 9 May 1993 in Inverness, Scotland, Laura Muir was raised in Milnathort, Perth and Kinross since age three. She attended Kinross High School, the same school as 400 m hurdler Eilidh Doyle along with her brother Rory who is two years younger than her.

She studied veterinary medicine at the University of Glasgow, graduating in 2018. One of her lecturers was veterinary pathologist, distance runner and teammate at the 2014 Commonwealth Games, Hayley Haining.

== Career ==
Muir made her international debut at the 2011 European Cross Country Championships, when she was part of the Great Britain junior women's team that won gold. At the end of the year, she was a nominee in the Daily Record Young Athlete of the Year awards.

At the 2013 European U23 Championships, Muir won bronze in the 1500 m with a time of 4:08.19. She went on to compete at the 2013 World Championships in Athletics in Moscow, representing Great Britain in the 800 metres; she reached the semi-finals with a personal best time of 2:00.83.

In July 2014, at the Diamond League event in Paris, she ran 4:00.07 in the 1500 metres to break Yvonne Murray's 27-year-old Scottish record. The same month, she competed in this event at the Glasgow Commonwealth Games, but was clipped from behind with 100 m to go and placed 11th with a time of 4:14.21. Muir failed to qualify from the 1500 m heats at the European Championships in Zürich in August with a time of 4:14.69. She called her run "a messy race".

She won a bronze medal over 3000 m at the 2015 European Indoor Championships in Prague, she initially finished fourth but was upgraded to bronze nine years later due to Yelena Korobkina's disqualification. Muir finished fifth over 1500 m at the 2015 World Championships held in Beijing in a time of 4:11.48.

=== 2016 ===
On 22 July, Muir broke Kelly Holmes' British record for the 1500 metres with a time of 3:57.49 to win the Diamond League event in London's Olympic Park.

The 2016 Rio Olympic Games were unsuccessful for her, as a tactical 1500 m final saw her fade from third to seventh at the finish line in 4:12.88. The winner, Faith Kipyegon of Kenya in 4:08.92, ran the last 800 metres in 1:57.2.

Less than two weeks later, on 27 August, Muir improved her own UK record by more than two seconds with a world-leading time of 3:55.22 to win the event at the Diamond League meet in Paris. A few days later, she became only the third British woman to win a Diamond Trophy as she won the 1500 m title with a second-place finish in Zürich, with the third fastest ever mark by a Briton. She overtook Kipyegon in seventh and won with her in the overall standings. Her mark from Paris made her the fastest woman in the world over 1500m for the year.

=== 2017 ===
On 4 January, racing the 5000 metres for the second time ever, Muir broke 25-year-old British indoor record held by her fellow Scot Liz McColgan, clocking 14:49.12 in Glasgow. She was the only competitor as it was a mixed 3K race. Exactly a month later, she set a European indoor 3000 metres record in Karlsruhe in a time of 8:26.41, beating Russian Liliya Shobukhova's mark by 1.45 seconds and reigning Olympic 5000 m silver medallist Hellen Obiri. On 18 February, Muir broke the European indoor 1000 metres record at the Birmingham Indoor Grand Prix. With her time of 2:31.93 (within a second of the world record), she beat Russian Yuliya Chizhenko's European record and Kelly Holmes's British best.

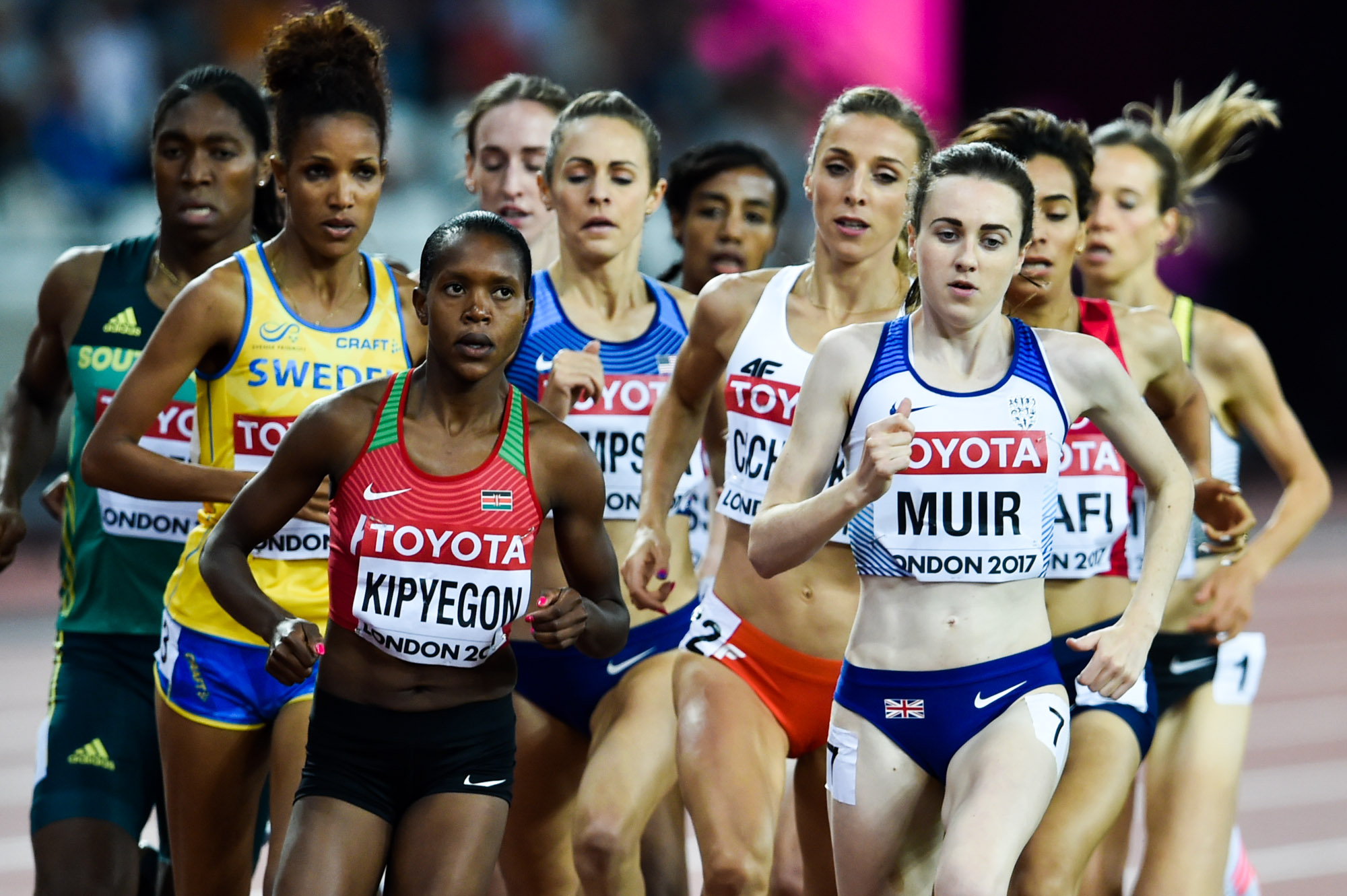
Muir (R) and Faith Kipyegon (L) lead the pack in the 1500 m final at the 2017 London World Championships.

Muir continued her record-breaking form in March, dominating at the European Indoor Championships in Belgrade. She took gold in the 1500 m event, breaking Kelly Holmes's British record and Doina Melinte's 32-year old championship best along the way, and followed it up by taking a second title in the 3000 m event with another championship record the next day. She became only the second woman to achieve this double at the European Indoor Championships after Poland's Lidia Chojecka, and only the second UK athlete after Colin Jackson to win two European Indoor titles at the same event.

She doubled up outdoors at the World Championships held in London, finishing fourth in the 1500 m and sixth in the 5000 m.

Following the championships, she announced that she would miss the 2018 Commonwealth Games in April in order to focus on her veterinary medicine exams.

=== 2018 ===
In March, Muir competed at the World Indoor Championships in Birmingham, where she won the bronze medal in the 3000 m, followed by a silver medal in the 1500 m two days later. Both events were won by Genzebe Dibaba.

In August, she won the 1500 metres title at the European Championships Berlin 2018, her first-ever major outdoor medal as the first British woman ever to win the European 1500 m gold.

She followed this breakthrough by securing her second Diamond League title over 1500 metres in Brussels, her first since the move of the series to a championship format. Muir produced one of the most impressive wins of her career, beating three of the four fastest women in the world that year (Shelby Houlihan, Hassan and Gudaf Tsegay).

=== 2019 ===
In February, Muir broke the 31-year-old British indoor mile record held by Kirsty Wade by more than five seconds, stopping the clock at the world third-fastest time of 4:18.75 at the Birmingham Indoor Grand Prix. She was 1.61 s short of a European record.

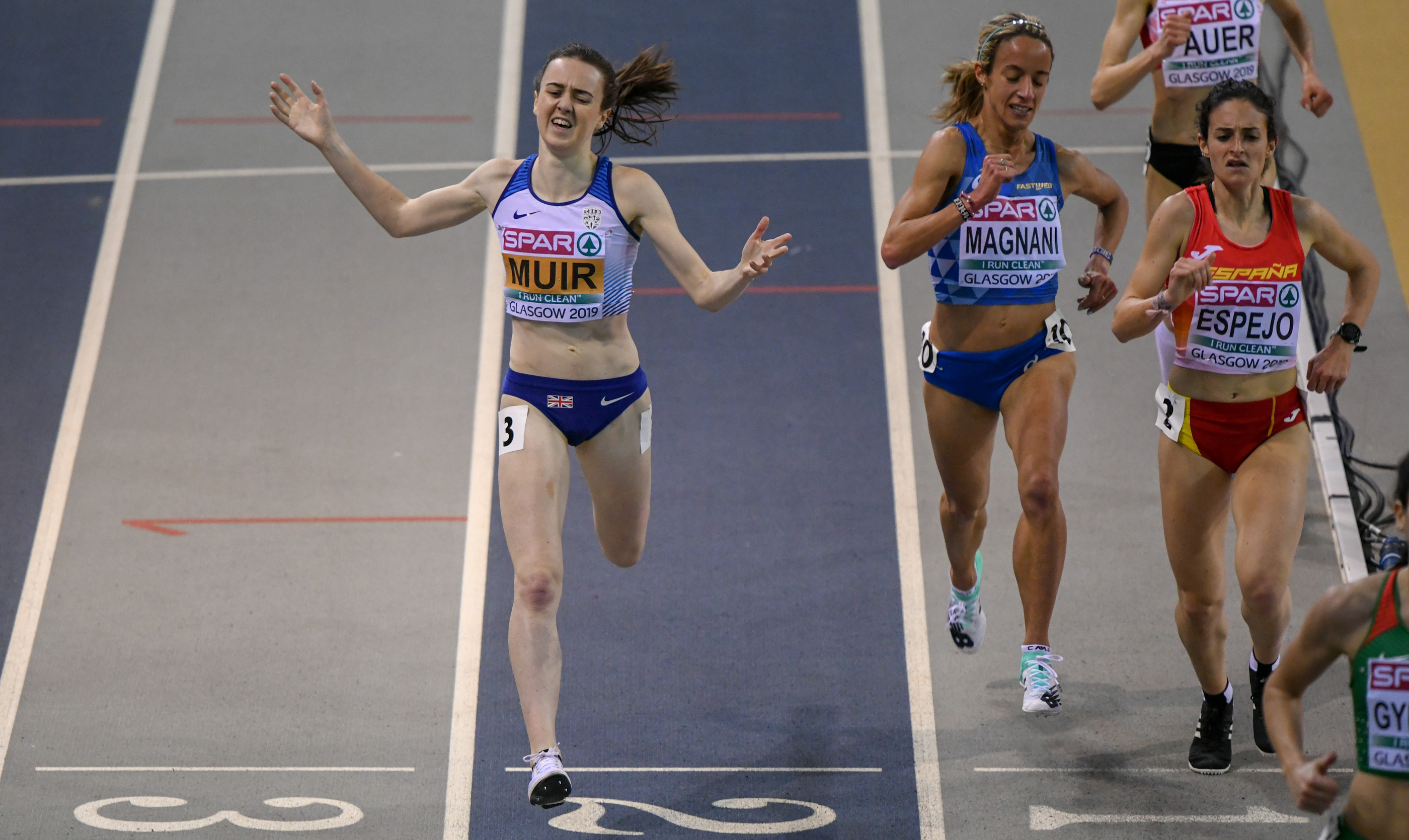
At the home 2019 European Indoor Championships in Glasgow, Muir (L) completed historic 1500 m/3000 m 'double-double'.

In March, she became the first athlete in history to achieve the 'double-double' at a European Indoors as she defended both her 1500 m and 3000 m titles at Glasgow 2019, improving her own championship record at the longer distance.

Muir finished fifth over the 1500 m at the Doha World Championships in a time of 3:55.76.

=== 2020–21 ===
During pandemic season in 2020, Muir broke Kelly Holmes' British record for the 1000 metres by almost two seconds in a time of 2:30.82, when finishing second behind Kipyegon at the Monaco Diamond League. She won all her three 1500 m races (Stockholm Diamond League, Chorzów, Berlin), with all times under 3:58.50. She also recorded victories in two of her six 800 m competitions (Marseille, Ostrava).

On 9 February 2021, she started her season well in Liévin, France, becoming the first British woman to break the four-minute barrier in the indoor 1500 m, and taking the record back from her Scottish training partner Jemma Reekie. Muir finished second behind Gudaf Tsegay with a time of 3:59.58 to move to fifth on the world indoor all-time list. Over 1500 m she then won the USATF Grand Prix in Eugene, Gateshead Diamond League, and came third in Rome Diamond League (behind only Hassan and Kipyegon). At the end of June, she lost to both Keely Hodgkinson and Reekie in the 800 m at the British Championships in 2:00.24 to set a personal best of 1:56.73 in July, when winning the Monaco Diamond League.

At the delayed 2020 Tokyo Olympics in August 2021, Muir won the silver medal in the 1500 metres in a time of three minutes 54.50 seconds, improving her own British record. She beat reigning world champion in the event, Sifan Hassan (3:55.86), finishing behind only Kipyegon who ran 3:53.11. It was Scotland's first individual Olympic medal in any track event since the 1988 Seoul Games, when Liz McColgan won 10,000 m silver.

=== 2022 ===
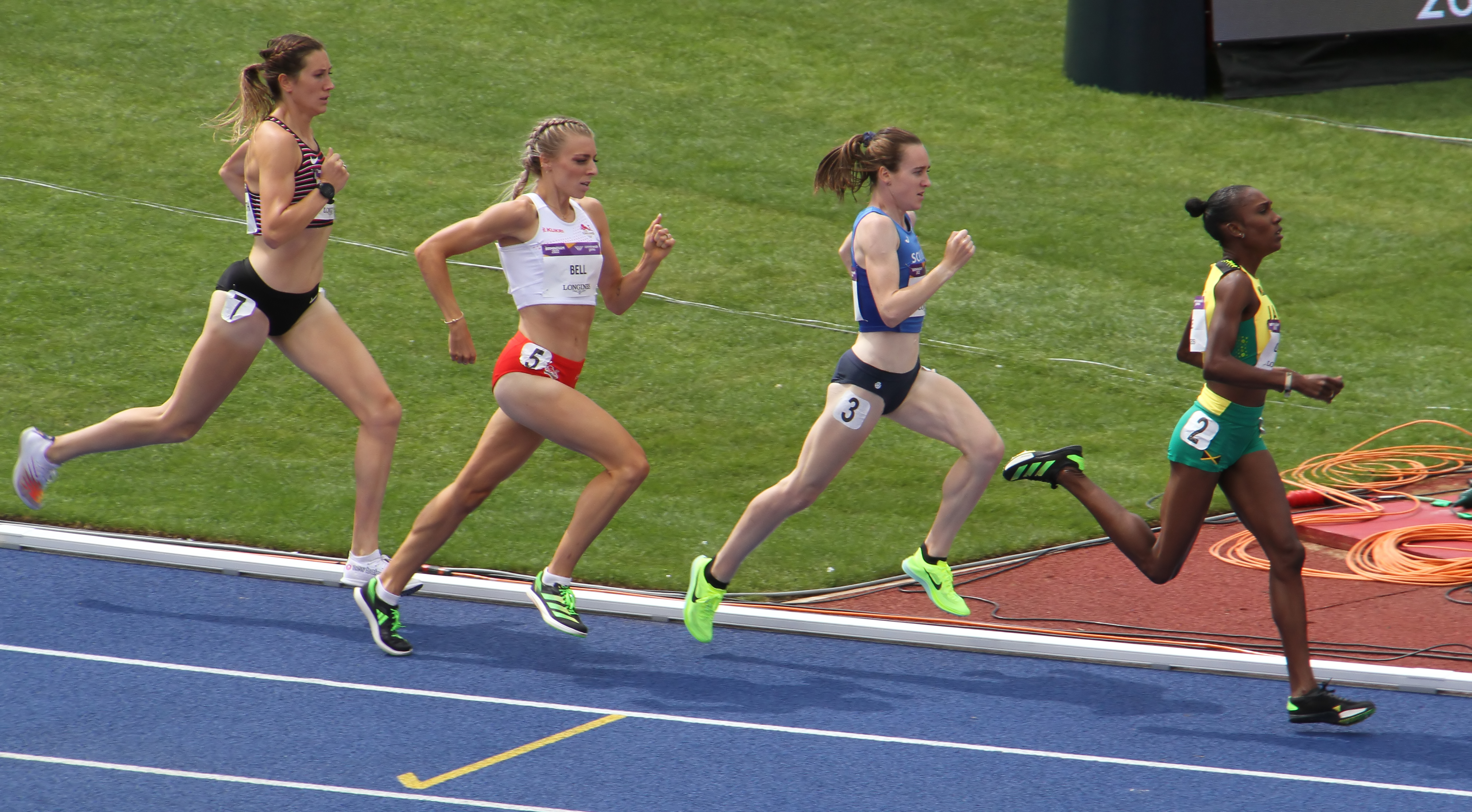
Muir (second from the right) races in the 800 m heat of the Birmingham Commonwealth Games.

During the indoor season, Muir was unable to run for two months due to a stress fracture of her right femur, which occurred in February. Despite this, at the World Championships Eugene 22 in July, she emerged with bronze. She ran her third-fastest time ever for a 1500 m race with 3:55.28, finishing behind Tsegay in 3:54.52 and Kipyegon who claimed gold in 3:52.96.

About two weeks later, Muir completed in just a 24-hour span the 800 m/1500 m double at the XXII Commonwealth Games in Birmingham, earning bronze in a photo-finish in the 800 m (0.01 s ahead of Natoya Goule and behind Mary Moraa and Hodgkinson) and, in the absence of Kipyegon, winning decisively gold for the 1500 m.

The 29-year-old continued her fine season successfully defending her 1500 m European title just 12 days after her Commonwealth gold. Muir dominated the event at the European Championships Munich 2022.

She capped her medal-winning season on the road in September, with another strong showing and a course record of 4:14.8 at the New York's Fifth Avenue Mile. Her time, the fastest in the event's 41-year history, would place her fourth on the world all-time list if it was achieved on the track. There was a Scottish sweep as Jake Wightman won the men's race for the third time.

=== 2023 ===
Muir opened her indoor season in USA in February with victories at the New Balance Indoor Grand Prix in Boston (3000 m) and at the Millrose Games in New York (prestigious Wanamaker Mile). She then won the 1000 m at the World Indoor Tour Final in Birmingham. She rounded off her indoor campaign by collecting her fifth European indoor title at Istanbul 2023 in March, competing in the 1500 m to become the first Brit in history to claim five golds at the European Indoors, as the accomplishment broke her tie with Colin Jackson and Jason Gardener.

In March 2023, it was announced that Laura Muir would no longer be coached by Andy Young.

=== 2024 ===
In January 2024, Muir was awarded a retrospective European Indoor bronze medal after Russian athlete Yelena Korobkina was found guilty of doping offences. Muir had finished 4th in the 3000m at the 2015 event in Prague. Muir won the 3000m at the UK Indoor Athletics Championship in February, in a time of 8 mins 58.8 seconds, gaining qualification for the 2024 world indoor championships.

After winning the 1500 metres silver medal at the 2024 British Athletics Championships, Muir was subsequently named in the Great Britain team for the 2024 Summer Olympics. On 7 July 2024, Muir set a new British 1,500 metres record as she came third in the Diamond League meeting in Paris with a time of three minutes 53.79 seconds.

== Achievements ==
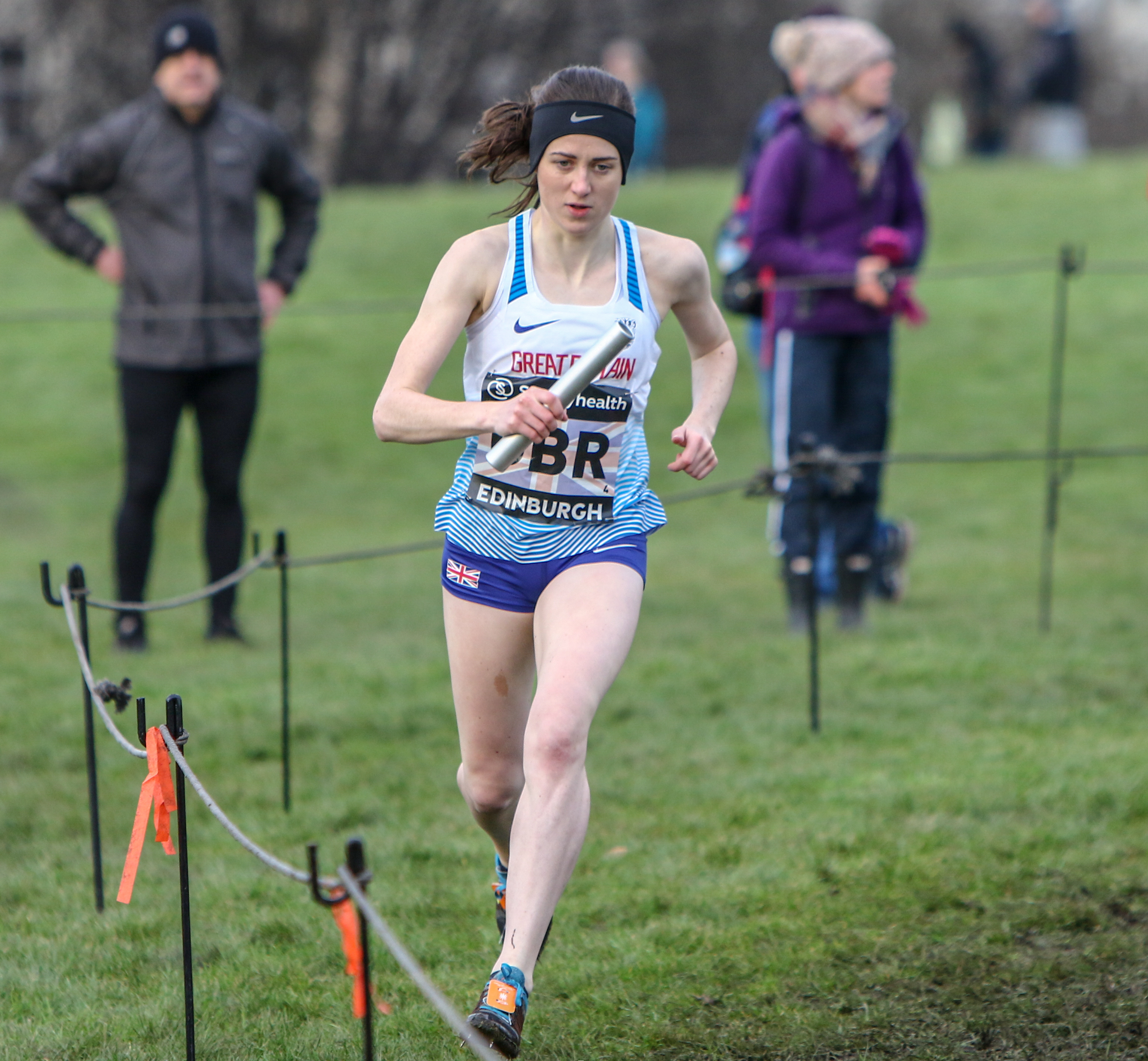
Laura Muir races in the 4 x 1 km mixed relay at the Great Edinburgh International Cross Country in 2018.

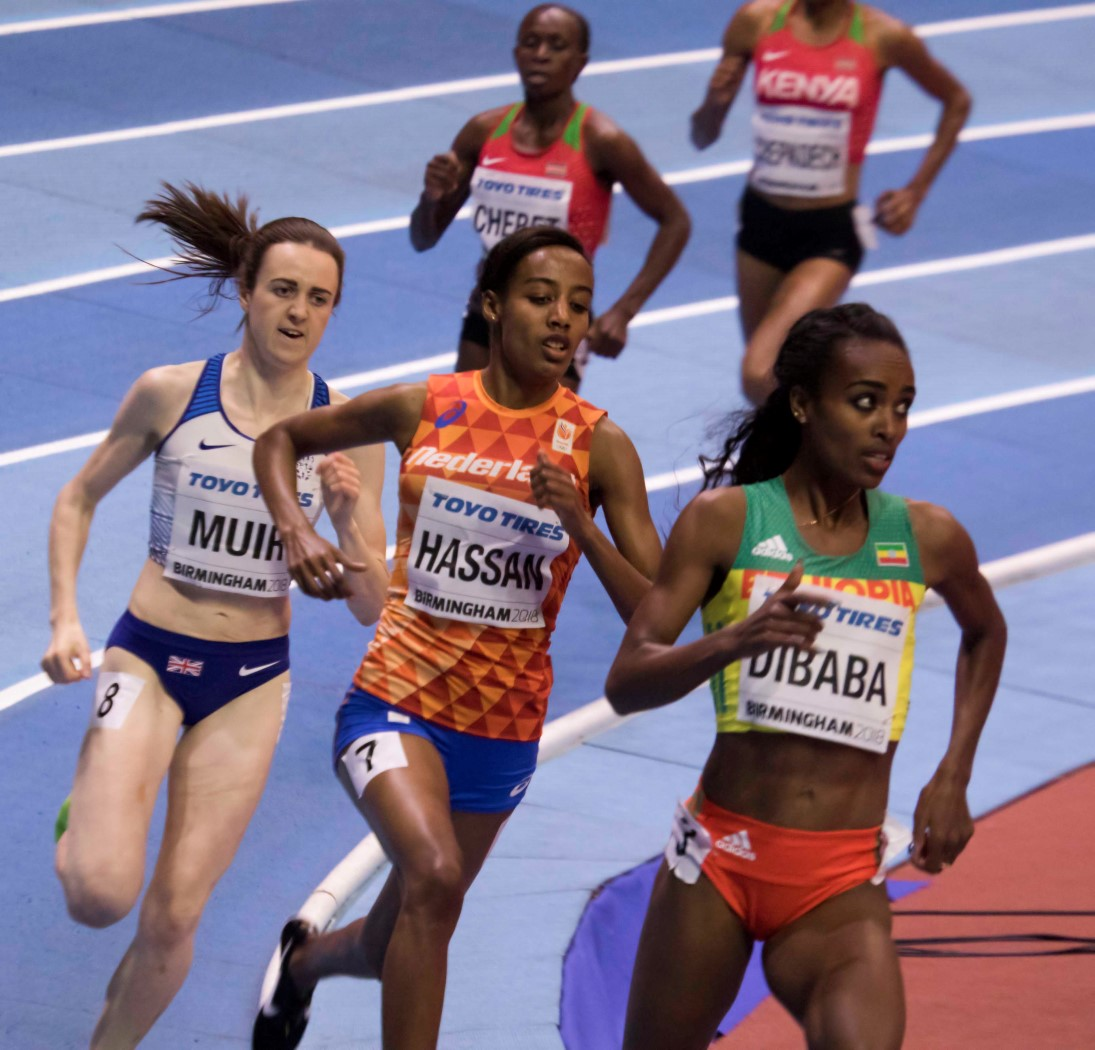
Muir (far left) en route to her 1500 m silver at the 2018 World Indoor Championships in Birmingham, with Sifan Hassan and Genzebe Dibaba (R).

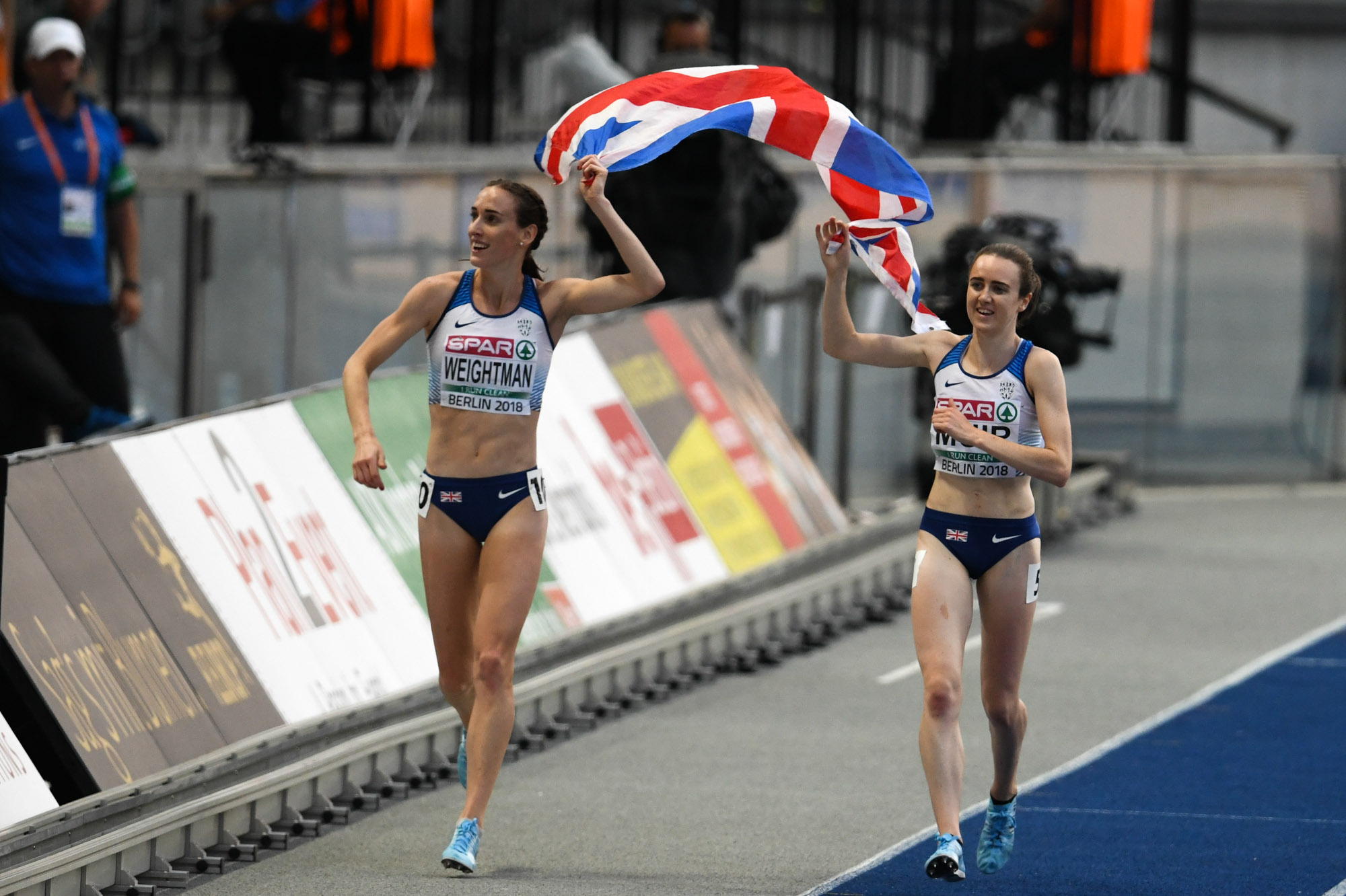
Laura Muir (R) and Laura Weightman (L) celebrate their 1500 m 1–3 at the 2018 European Athletics Championships in Berlin.

All information taken from World Athletics profile.

=== Personal bests ===
Type	Event	Time (m:s)	Date	Place	Notes
Outdoor track	800 metres	1:56.73	9 July 2021	Monaco	
Outdoor track	1000 metres	2:30.82	14 August 2020	Monaco	NR, fastest European this century
Outdoor track	1500 metres	3:53.79	7 July 2024	Paris, France	NR, second fastest European this century
Outdoor track	One mile	4:15.24	21 July 2023	Monaco	NR, third fastest European this century
Outdoor track	3000 metres	8:30.53	26 August 2022	Lausanne	
Outdoor track	5000 metres	14:42.63	9 June 2023	Paris, France	
Indoor	800 metres	1:58.44	1 February 2020	Glasgow, United Kingdom	
Indoor	1000 metres	2:31.93	18 February 2017	Birmingham, United Kingdom	European record
Indoor	1500 metres	3:59.58	9 February 2021	Liévin, France	NR, third fastest European this century
Indoor	One mile	4:18.75	16 February 2019	Birmingham, United Kingdom	
Indoor	3000 metres	8:26.41	4 February 2017	Karlsruhe, Germany	European record
Indoor	5000 metres	14:49.12	4 January 2017	Glasgow, United Kingdom	NR

=== International competitions ===
Representing Great Britain / Scotland
Year	Competition	Venue	Position	Event	Result
2011	European Cross Country Championships	Velenje, Slovenia	30th	Junior race	14:06
2012	World Junior Championships	Barcelona, Spain	16th	3000 m	9:40.81
2013	European Indoor Championships	Gothenburg, Sweden	6th	1500 m	4:18.39 (Note: In the heats Muir clocked 4:12.36)
2013	European U23 Championships	Tampere, Finland	3rd	1500 m	4:08.19
2013	World Championships	Moscow, Russia	9th (sf)	800 m	2:00.83
2014	World Indoor Championships	Sopot, Poland	7th (h)	800 m	2:02.55
2014	Commonwealth Games	Glasgow, Scotland	11th	1500 m	4:14.21
2014	European Championships	Zurich, Switzerland	15th (h)	1500 m	4:14.69
2015	European Indoor Championships	Prague, Czech Republic	3rd	3000 m	8:52.44
2015	World Championships	Beijing, China	5th	1500 m	4:11.48
2015	European Cross Country Championships	Hyères, France	4th	U23 race	19:53
2015	European Cross Country Championships	Hyères, France	1st	U23 team	41 pts
2016	Olympic Games	Rio de Janeiro, Brazil	7th	1500 m	4:12.88
2017	European Indoor Championships	Belgrade, Serbia	1st	1500 m	4:02.39
2017	European Indoor Championships	Belgrade, Serbia	1st	3000 m	8:35.67
2017	World Championships	London, United Kingdom	4th	1500 m	4:02.97
2017	World Championships	London, United Kingdom	6th	5000 m	14:52.07
2018	World Indoor Championships	Birmingham, United Kingdom	2nd	1500 m	4:06:23
2018	World Indoor Championships	Birmingham, United Kingdom	3rd	3000 m	8:45:78
2018	European Championships	Berlin, Germany	1st	1500 m	4:02:32
2019	European Indoor Championships	Glasgow, United Kingdom	1st	1500 m	4:05.92
2019	European Indoor Championships	Glasgow, United Kingdom	1st	3000 m	8:30.61
2019	World Championships	Doha, Qatar	5th	1500 m	3:55.76
2021	Olympic Games	Tokyo, Japan	2nd	1500 m	3:54.50
2022	World Championships	Eugene, OR, United States	3rd	1500 m	3:55.28 SB
2022	Commonwealth Games	Birmingham, England	3rd	800 m	1:57.87 SB
2022	Commonwealth Games	Birmingham, England	1st	1500 m	4:02.75
2022	European Championships	Munich, Germany	1st	1500 m	4:01.08
2023	European Indoor Championships	Istanbul, Turkey	1st	1500 m	4:03.40
2023	World Championships	Budapest, Hungary	6th	1500 m	3:58.58
2024	World Indoor Championships	Glasgow, United Kingdom	5th	3000 m	8:29.76
2024	Olympic Games	Paris, France	5th	1500 m	3:53.37
2025	World Championships	Tokyo, Japan	22nd (h)	1500 m	4:05.59
2026	Commonwealth Games	Glasgow, United Kingdom	16th	5000 m	15:19.75
2026	European Championships	Birmingham, United Kingdom	10th (h)	1500 m	4:09.66

=== Circuit wins and titles ===
- Diamond League Overall 1500 m Diamond Race title: 2016
- Diamond League 1500 m champion: 2018
  - 2015 – 1500m: Oslo Bislett Games
  - 2016 – 1500m: London Anniversary Games (MR (NR), Meeting de Paris (WL MR NR)
  - 2018 – Birmingham British Grand Prix (1000m PB), Brussels Memorial Van Damme (1500m)
  - 2019 – 1500m: Stockholm Bauhaus-Galan, London Anniversary Games
  - 2020 – 1500m: Stockholm Bauhaus-Galan (WL)
  - 2021 – Gateshead British Grand Prix (1500m), Monaco Herculis (800m (PB)
  - 2022 – Birmingham British Grand Prix (1500m)
- World Athletics Continental Tour
  - 2020: Marseille Meeting Pro Athlé Tour (Bronze level, 800m), Chorzów Kamila Skolimowska Memorial (1500m), Ostrava Golden Spike (800m), Berlin ISTAF (Silver level, 1500m)
  - 2021: Eugene USATF Grand Prix (1500m), Irvine Track Meet (Bronze level, 800m)
- World Athletics Indoor Tour
  - 2017: Karlsruhe Indoor Meeting (3000m, AR), Birmingham Indoor Grand Prix (1000m, AR)
  - 2019: Birmingham (Mile, NR)
  - 2020: Glasgow Indoor Grand Prix (1000m)
  - 2023: Boston New Balance Indoor Grand Prix (3000m), New York Millrose Games (Mile), Birmingham World Indoor Tour Final (1000m)

=== National titles ===
- British Athletics Championships
  - 800 metres: 2018
  - 1500 metres: 2015, 2016, 2022
- British Indoor Athletics Championships
  - 800 metres: 2014
  - 1500 metres: 2013, 2015
  - 3000 metres: 2018, 2019, 2024

=== Scottish titles ===
- Scottish Championships
  - 1500 metres: 2012
- Scottish Indoor Championships
  - 800 metres: 2012, 2018
- Scottish University Championships
  - 400 metres: 2013
- Scottish University Indoor Championships
  - 400 metres: 2012, 2013
  - 800 metres: 2012, 2013, 2016
  - 1500 metres: 2018

== Awards and honours ==
- British Athletics Writers' Association
  - Cliff Temple Award for British Female Athlete of the Year: 2017, 2022 (jointly with Eilish McColgan)
- Scottish Women in Sport
  - Sportswoman of the Year: 2020
- Scottish Athletics
  - Athlete of the Year: 2015, 2016, 2018, 2021
  - Performer of the Year: 2020 (with Jemma Reekie and Jake Wightman)
- Scottish Sports Awards
  - Female Athlete of the Year: 2022
- Glasgow's Sport Awards
  - Glasgow Sportsperson of the Year: 2022
- British Milers' Club
  - BMC Female Athlete of the Year: 2022
- University of Glasgow
  - DOCTOR of the university (DUniv): 2023

=== Miscellaneous ===
In 2022, one of the new streets in Muir's home town Milnathort was named in her honour.
