= Marta Pen =

Portuguese middle-distance runner (born 1993)

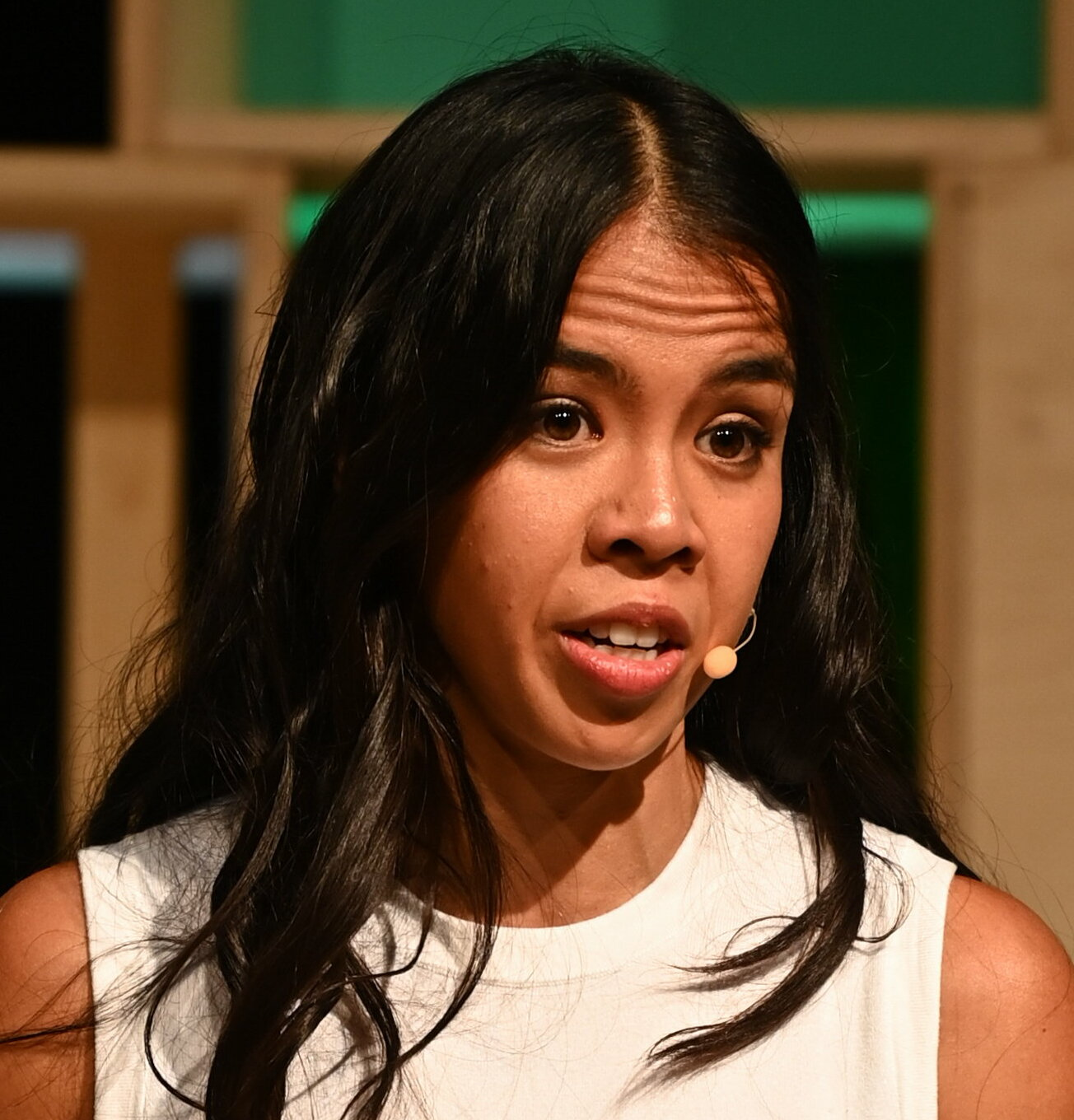
- Freitas in November 2022

Personal information
- Full name: Marta Filipa Pen Freitas Pires
- Nationality: Portuguese
- Born: 31 July 1993 (age 32) Lisbon, Portugal
- Education: Mississippi State Bulldogs
- Occupation: Professional Runner
- Height: 1.53 m (5 ft 0 in)
- Weight: 46 kg (101 lb)

Sport
- Country: Portugal
- Sport: Athletics
- Events: 800 metres 1500 metres
- Club: Benfica
- Coached by: Houston Franks - Mississippi State & Ana Oliveira

Achievements and titles
- National finals: 1 x European Champs finalist 1 x Ibero-American Bronze; 1 x NCAA outdoor champion 2 x National champion 3 x National Indoor champion
- Personal bests: 1500 metres 4:03.99 Birmingham (2018)

Marta Filipa Pen Oliveira Freitas (born 31 July 1993), commonly referred to as Marta Pen, is a Portuguese athlete who competes in middle-distance running events, holding the national record in the mile run, with a time of 4:22.45. At club level, she represents S.L. Benfica.

Freitas won the 2016 U.S. NCAA Championship in the 1500m competing for Mississippi State University in Eugene, Oregon. Moreover, she won a bronze medal in 800 metres at the 2014 Ibero-American Championships. On 10 July 2016, she competed in the final of the 1500 m at the European Athletics Championships, finishing in fifth position with 4:34.41 minutes.

Freitas competed for Portugal at the 2016 Summer Olympics. She placed 36th in Athletics at the 2016 Summer Olympics – Women's 1500 metres in 4:18.53.
