= Kristiina Mäki =

Finnish-born runner (born 1991)

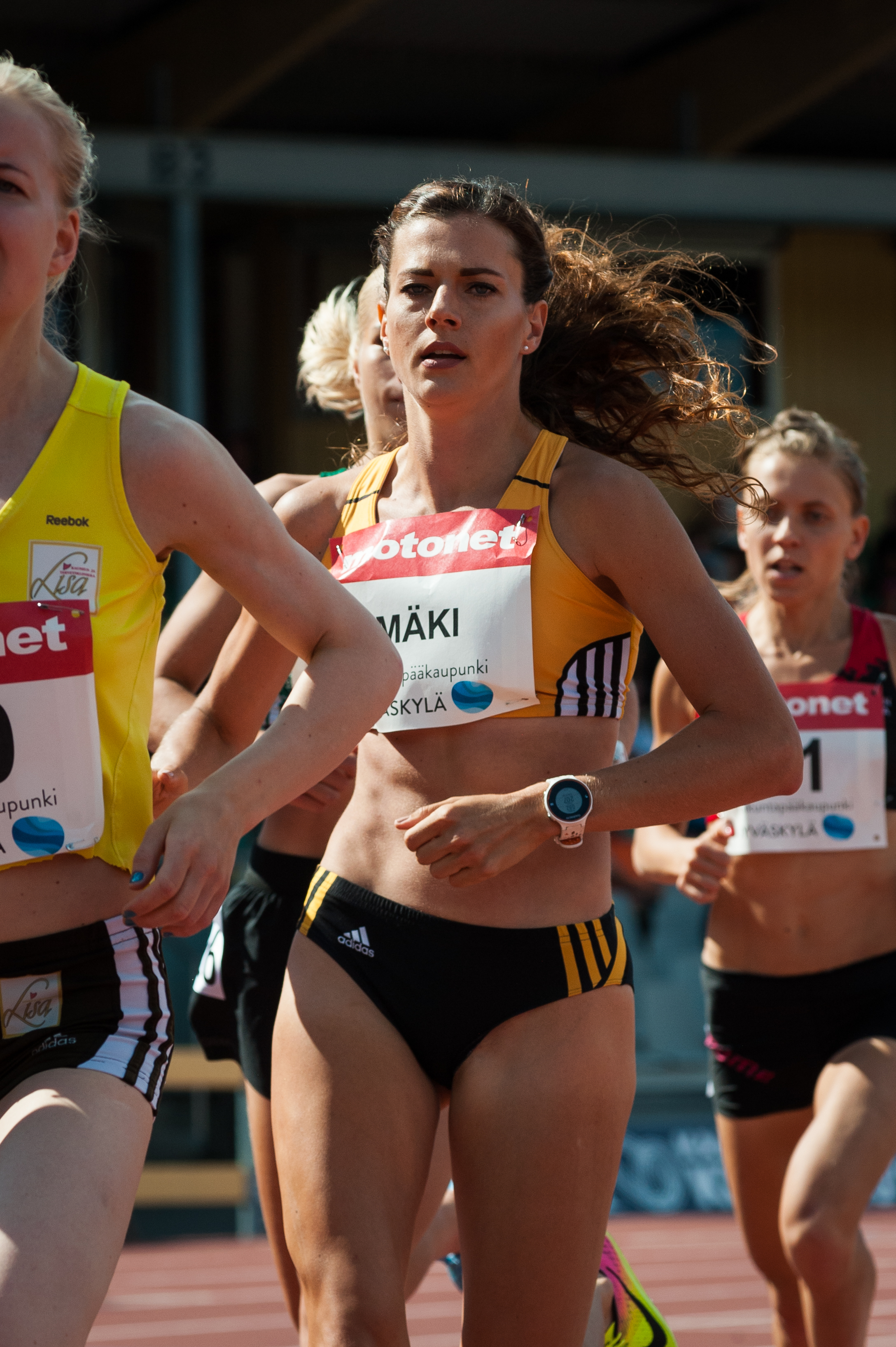
- Mäki in 2018

Personal information
- Born: 22 September 1991 (age 34) Seinäjoki, Finland

Sport
- Sport: long distance
- Club: Lahden Ahkera, Lahti; Hvězda SKP Pardubice

Kristiina Hannele Sasínek Mäki, née Kristiina Hannele Mäki (born 22 September 1991) is a Finnish-born runner who represents the Czech Republic in international competitions.

== Background ==
Mäki was born in Seinäjoki, Finland and moved to the Czech Republic with her parents at the age of three. Her father is Finnish and mother from the Czech Republic, both former runners.

== Running career ==
In February 2014 Mäki ran the fastest Finnish indoor time of 21st century with 9.02,14 and also won gold medals from 2014 Finnish indoor championships from both 1500 and 3000 meters. She now represents solely the Czech Republic.

In June 2014 Mäki broke the 14-year-old record set by Marjo Venäläinen in the rarely run 2000 meters and was also the first Finnish woman to break the 6-minute barrier. The new record is 5.42,71. In the same month she broke the qualifying limit for Zurich European Championship on 5000 meters; the 15.35,82 result was the best Finnish time of the 21st century and fourth of all time in Finland. In August 2014 Mäki won silver in 1500m at the Finnish outdoor championships.

As of October 2025, Mäki is the Czech record holder at 1500m, 2000m, 3000m and 5000m. She has also claimed gold medals from Czech championships in the 5000m (2013), 1500m indoors (2013 and 2014) and 3000m indoors (2013).

== Personal life ==
In October 2023, Mäki married athlete Filip Sasínek, with whom she has a son named Kaapo.
