= Italy at the European Cross Country Championships =

Italy team at athletics event

- WA code: ITA
- National federation: FIDAL
- Website: www.fidal.it
- Medals Ranked 10th: Gold 2 Silver 2 Bronze 7 Total 11

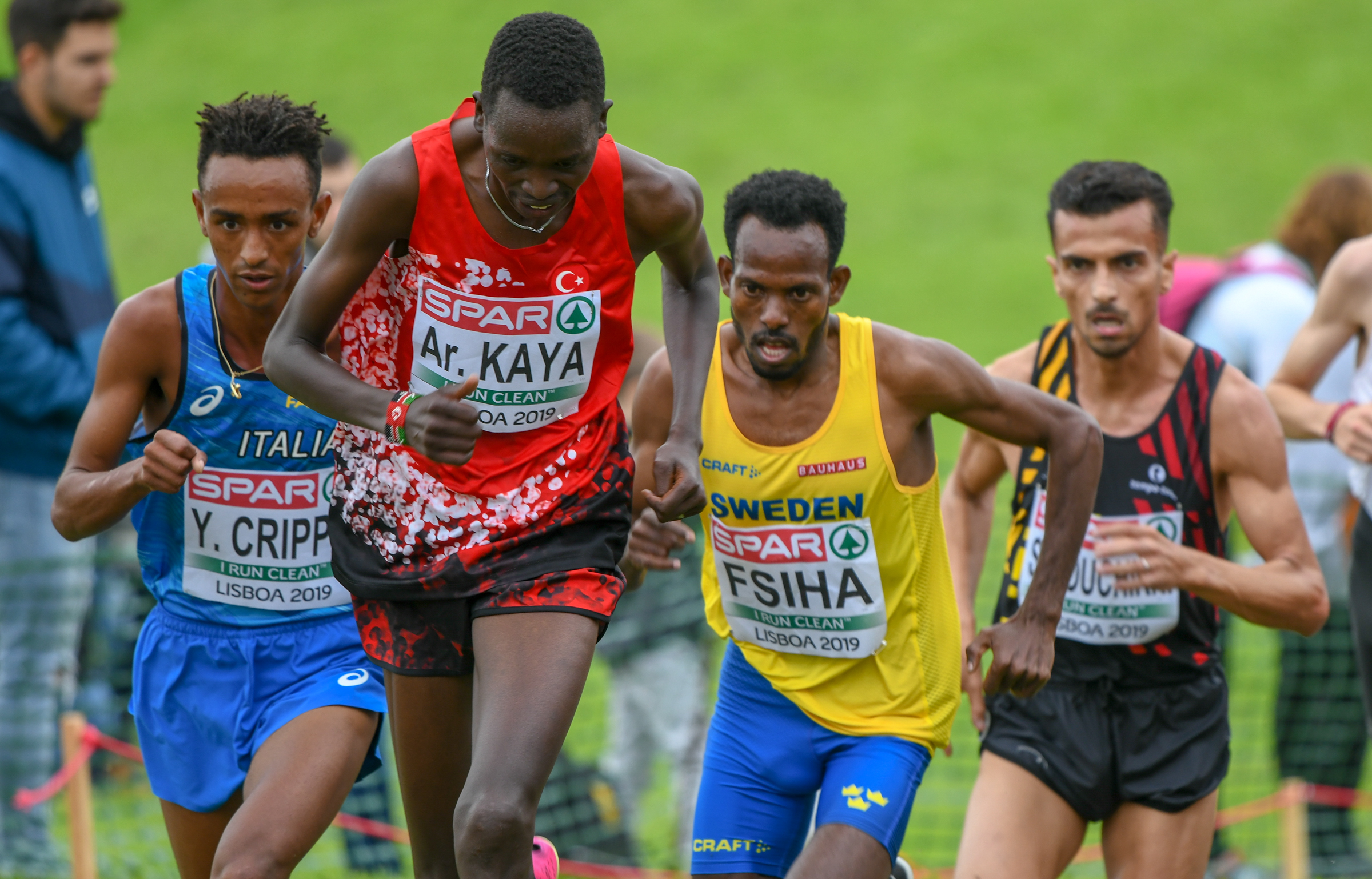
Yeman Crippa (left) at the 2019 European Cross Country Championships.

Italy at the European Cross Country Championships participated at all editions of the European Cross Country Championships from Alnwick 1994.

== Medal count ==
=== Senior ===
Edition	Men			Women			Mixed			Total		
Edition	1st place, gold medalist(s)	2nd place, silver medalist(s)	3rd place, bronze medalist(s)	1st place, gold medalist(s)	2nd place, silver medalist(s)	3rd place, bronze medalist(s)	1st place, gold medalist(s)	2nd place, silver medalist(s)	3rd place, bronze medalist(s)	1st place, gold medalist(s)	2nd place, silver medalist(s)	3rd place, bronze medalist(s)
(United Kingdom) Alnwick 1994	0	0	0	0	0	0				0	0	0
(United Kingdom) Alnwick 1995	0	0	0	0	0	0				0	0	0
(France) Charleroi 1996	0	0	0	0	0	0				0	0	0
(Portugal) Oeiras 1997	0	0	0	0	0	0				0	0	0
(Italy) Ferrara 1998	1	0	0	0	0	0				1	0	0
(Slovenia) Valenje 1999	0	0	0	0	0	0				0	0	0
(Sweden) Malmö 2000	0	0	0	0	0	0				0	0	0
(Switzerland) Thun 2001	0	0	0	0	0	0				0	0	0
(Croatia) Medulin 2002	0	0	0	0	0	0				0	0	0
(United Kingdom) Edinburgh 2003	0	0	0	0	0	0				0	0	0
(Germany) Heringsdorf 2004	0	1	0	0	0	0				0	1	0
(Netherlands) Tilburg 2005	0	0	0	0	0	0				0	0	0
(Italy) San Giorgio su Legnano 2006	0	0	0	0	0	0				0	0	0
(Spain) Toro 2007	0	0	0	0	0	0				0	0	0
(Belgium) Brussels 2008	0	0	0	0	0	0				0	0	0
(Republic of Ireland) Dublin 2009	0	0	1	0	0	0				0	0	1
(Portugal) Albufeira 2010	0	0	0	0	0	0				0	0	0
(Slovenia) Velenje 2011	0	0	0	0	0	0				0	0	0
(Hungary) Szentendre 2012	1	0	2	0	0	0				1	0	2
(Serbia) Belgrade 2013	0	0	0	0	0	0				0	0	0
(Bulgaria) Samokov 2014	0	0	1	0	0	0				0	0	1
(France) Hyères-Toulon 2015	0	0	0	0	0	0				0	0	0
(Italy) Chia 2016	0	0	0	0	0	0				0	0	0
(Slovakia) Šamorín 2017	0	0	0	0	0	0	0	0	0	0	0	0
(Netherlands) Tilburg 2018	0	0	1	0	0	0	0	0	0	0	0	1
(Portugal) Lisbon 2019	0	0	1	0	0	0	0	0	0	0	0	1
(Republic of Ireland) Dublin 2021	0	0	0	0	0	0	0	0	0	0	0	0
(Italy) Turin 2022	0	0	0	0	0	0	1	0	0	1	0	0
(Belgium) Brussels 2023	0	0	0	0	1	0	0	0	0	0	1	0

== Medalists ==
Andrea Lalli won the competition in all three categories: senior, under 23 and under 20 (previously named junior).

=== Senior ===
==== Individual ====
Edition	Event	Runner	Medal
(Hungary) Szentendre 2012	Men's senior race	Andrea Lalli	1st place, gold medalist(s)
(Hungary) Szentendre 2012	Men's senior race	Daniele Meucci	3rd place, bronze medalist(s)
(Portugal) Lisbon 2019	Men's senior race	Yemaneberhan Crippa	3rd place, bronze medalist(s)
(Belgium) Brussels 2023	Women's senior race	Nadia Battocletti	2nd place, silver medalist(s)

==== Team ====
Edition	Team	Medal
(Italy) Ferrara 1998	Giuliano Battocletti, Gabriele De Nard, Umberto Pusterla, Gennaro Di Napoli	1st place, gold medalist(s)
(Germany) Heringsdorf 2004	Umberto Pusterla, Maurizio Leone, Michele Gamba, Gabriele De Nard, Luciano Di Pardo, Giuliano Battocletti	2nd place, silver medalist(s)
(Republic of Ireland) Dublin 2009	Daniele Meucci, Stefano La Rosa, Andrea Lalli, Gabriele De Nard	3rd place, bronze medalist(s)
(Hungary) Szentendre 2012	Andrea Lalli, Daniele Meucci, Gabriele De Nard, Patrick Nasti, Alex Baldaccini	3rd place, bronze medalist(s)
(Slovakia) Samokov 2014	Stefano La Rosa, Marouan Razine, Patrick Nasti, Ahmed El Mazoury	3rd place, bronze medalist(s)
(Netherlands) Tilburg 2018	Yemaneberhan Crippa, Daniele Meucci, Nekagenet Crippa, Ahmed El Mazoury, Andrea Sanguinetti, Marouan Razine (Note: In italic the participants whose result did not go into the team's total time, but awarded with medals.)	3rd place, bronze medalist(s)

===== Mixed =====
Edition	Team	Medal
(Italy) Turin 2022	Pietro Arese, Federica Del Buono, Yassin Bouih, Gaia Sabbatini	1st place, gold medalist(s)

=== Under 23 ===
Italy at under 23 level won 2 gold medals, 3 silver and 6 bronze.

Edition	Event	Runner	Medal
(Italy) San Giorgio su Legnano 2006	Men's individual	Daniele Meucci	3rd place, bronze medalist(s)
(Italy) San Giorgio su Legnano 2006	Men's team	Daniele Meucci, Stefano La Rosa, Martin Dematteis, Luca Tocco	2nd place, silver medalist(s)
(Italy) San Giorgio su Legnano 2006	Women's team	Adelina De Soccio, Sara Dossena, Giorgia Robaudo, Giulia Francario	3rd place, bronze medalist(s)
(Belgium) Brussels 2008	Men's individual	Andrea Lalli	1st place, gold medalist(s)
(Belgium) Brussels 2008	Men's team	Andrea Lalli, Martin Dematteis, Bernard Dematteis, Simone Gariboldi	2nd place, silver medalist(s)
(France) Hyères-Toulon 2015	Women's team	Federica Del Buono, Christine Santi, Costanza Martinetti, Francesca Bertoni, Isabella Papa, Silvia Oggioni	3rd place, bronze medalist(s)
(Italy) Chia 2016	Men's individual	Yemaneberhan Crippa	3rd place, bronze medalist(s)
(Italy) Chia 2016	Men's team	Yemaneberhan Crippa, Samuele Dini, Said Ettaqy, Lorenzo Dini, Yassin Bouih, Italo Quazzola	1st place, gold medalist(s)
(Italy) Chia 2016	Women's team	Christine Santi, Silvia Oggioni, Roberta Ciappini, Costanza Martinetti, Giulia Mattioli, Alice Rita Cocco	3rd place, bronze medalist(s)
(Slovakia) Šamorín 2017	Men's individual	Yemaneberhan Crippa	3rd place, bronze medalist(s)
(Portugal) Lisbon 2019	Men's team	Yohanes Chiappinelli, Jacopo De Marchi, Sebastiano Parolini, Riccardo Mugnosso, Pasquale Selvarolo, Sergiy Polikarpenko	2nd place, silver medalist(s)

=== Under 20 ===
Italy at junior (under 20 from 2018) level won 7 gold medals, 4 silver and 4 bronze.

Edition	Event	Runners	Medal
(Switzerland) Thun 2001	Men's individual	Stefano Scaini	3rd place, bronze medalist(s)
(Croatia) Medulin 2002	Men's team	Stefano Scaini, Stefano Cugusi, Dereje Rabattoni, Francesco Bona	3rd place, bronze medalist(s)
(Italy) San Giorgio su Legnano 2006	Men's individual	Andrea Lalli	1st place, gold medalist(s)
(Italy) San Giorgio su Legnano 2006	Men's team	Andrea Lalli, Simone Gariboldi, Antonio Garavello, Merihun Crespi	1st place, gold medalist(s)
(Serbia) Belgrade 2013	Men's team	Lorenzo Dini, Yemaneberhan Crippa, Samuele Dini, Nekagenet Crippa, Osama Zoghlami, Italo Quazzola	3rd place, bronze medalist(s)
(Bulgaria) Samokov 2014	Men's individual	Yemaneberhan Crippa	1st place, gold medalist(s)
(Bulgaria) Samokov 2014	Men's individual	Said Ettaqy	3rd place, bronze medalist(s)
(Bulgaria) Samokov 2014	Men's team	Yemaneberhan Crippa, Said Ettaqy, Yohanes Chiappinelli, Alessandro Giacobazzi	1st place, gold medalist(s)
(France) Hyères-Toulon 2015	Men's individual	Yemaneberhan Crippa	1st place, gold medalist(s)
(France) Hyères-Toulon 2015	Men's team	Yemaneberhan Crippa, Said Ettaqy, Pietro Riva, Alessandro Giacobazzi	2nd place, silver medalist(s)
(Italy) Chia 2016	Men's individual	Yohanes Chiappinelli	2nd place, silver medalist(s)
(Slovakia) Šamorín 2017	Women's team	Nadia Battocletti, Francesca Tommasi, Elisa Cherubini, Micol Majori, Laura De Marco	2nd place, silver medalist(s)
(Netherlands) Tilburg 2018	Women's individual	Nadia Battocletti	1st place, gold medalist(s)
(Portugal) Lisbon 2019	Women's individual	Nadia Battocletti	1st place, gold medalist(s)
(Portugal) Lisbon 2019	Women's team	Nadia Battocletti, Angela Mattevi, Kudovica Cavalli, Anna Arnaudo, Giada Licandro, Laura Pellicoro	2nd place, silver medalist(s)

== See also ==
- Italy national athletics team
- Italian team at the running events
