= 2015 European Cross Country Championships =

- Organisers: EAA
- Edition: 22nd
- Date: 13 December
- Host city: Hyères, France
- Venue: Hippodrome de Hyères
- Events: 6
- Distances: 10.117 km – Men; 8.087 km – Women; 8.087 km – U23 men 5.947 km – U23 women 5.947 km – Junior men 4.157 km – Junior women

The 2015 European Cross Country Championships was the 22nd edition of the cross country running competition for European athletes. It was hosted in Hyères, France.

The 2014 runner-up Ali Kaya took the men's senior title, retaining the crown for Turkey. Spain, led by 2013 champion Alemayehu Bezabeh, returned to the top of the team rankings in that category. Sifan Hassan of the Netherlands was the women's senior winner, building upon her under-23 title win of 2013. Great Britain defended the women's team title, led by Kate Avery, who was runner-up for a second time running. Both senior individual runners were non-European born (Kenya for Kaya and Ethiopia for Hassan). All of the top five finishers in the men's race were born outside Europe.

== Race results ==
=== Senior men ===
Individual race
Rank	Athlete	Country	Time (m:s)
Gold medal	Ali Kaya	Turkey	29:20
Silver medal	Alemayehu Bezabeh	Spain	29:31
Bronze medal	Adel Mechaal	Spain	29:51
4	Ayad Lamdassem	Spain	29:57
5	Ilias Fifa	Spain	30:02
6	Florian Carvalho	France	30:06
7	Roberto Aláiz	Spain	30:20
8	Yohan Durand	France	30:20
9	Morhad Amdouni	France	30:24
10	David Nilsson	Sweden	30:25

Teams
Rank	Team	Points
Gold medal	Spain; Alemayehu Bezabeh; Adel Mechaal; Ayad Lamdassem; Ilias Fifa	14
Silver medal	France; Florian Carvalho; Yohan Durand; Morhad Amdouni; Timothée Bommier	35
Bronze medal	Great Britain; Tom Lancashire; Ross Millington; Dewi Griffiths; Jonathan Taylor	78

=== Senior women ===
Individual race
Rank	Athlete	Country	Time (m:s)
Gold medal	Sifan Hassan	Netherlands	25:47
Silver medal	Kate Avery	Great Britain	25:55
Bronze medal	Karoline Bjerkeli Grøvdal	Norway	25:57
4	Fionnuala McCormack	Ireland	26:00
5	Ancuta Bobocel	Romania	26:07
6	Steph Twell	Great Britain	26:08
7	Clémence Calvin	France	26:17
8	Gemma Steel	Great Britain	26:25
9	Maureen Koster	Netherlands	26:28
10	Johana Peiponen	Finland	26:34

Teams
Rank	Team	Points
Gold medal	Great Britain; Kate Avery; Steph Twell; Gemma Steel; Lauren Howarth	33
Silver medal	France; Clémence Calvin; Christelle Daunay; Liv Westphal; Christine Bardelle	78
Bronze medal	Ireland; Fionnuala McCormack; Lizzie Lee; Caroline Crowley; Ciara Durkan	83

=== Under-23 men ===
Individual race
Rank	Athlete	Country	Time (m:s)
Gold medal	Jonathan Davies	Great Britain	23:32
Silver medal	Carlos Mayo	Spain	23:35
Bronze medal	Amanal Petros	Germany	23:29
4	Marc Scott	Great Britain	23:29
5	Djilali Bedrani	France	23:41
6	Lorenzo Dini	Italy	23:41
7	Nassim Hassaous	Spain	23:47
8	Napoleon Soloman	Sweden	23:49
9	Jaime Escriche	Spain	23:50
10	Peter Glans	Denmark	23:52

Teams
Rank	Team	Points
Gold medal	Spain; Carlos Mayo; Nassim Hassaous; Jaime Escriche; Houssane Benabbou	39
Silver medal	Great Britain; Jonathan Davies; Marc Scott; Richard Goodman; Henry Pearce	41
Bronze medal	France; Djilali Bedrani; Alexandre Saddedine; Francois Barrer; Félix Bour	59

=== Under-23 women ===
Individual race
Rank	Athlete	Country	Time (m:s)
Gold medal	Louise Carton	Belgium	19:46
Silver medal	Jip Vastenburg	Netherlands	19:46
Bronze medal	Amela Terzić	Serbia	19:49
4	Laura Muir	Great Britain	19:53
5	Viktoria Kushnir	Belarus	20:05
6	Sarah Lahti	Sweden	20:06
7	Federica Del Buono	Italy	20:12
8	Emma Oudiou	France	20:14
9	Molly Renfer	Switzerland	20:14
10	Madeleine Murray	Great Britain	20:15

Teams
Rank	Team	Points
Gold medal	Great Britain; Laura Muir; Madeleine Murray; Jennifer Nesbitt; Rebecca Murray	41
Silver medal	France; Emma Oudiou; Maëva Danois; Marie Bouchard; Cécile Jarousseau	71
Bronze medal	Italy; Federica Del Buono; Christine Santi; Costanza Martinetti; Francesca Bertoni; Isabella Papa; Silvia Oggioni	82

=== Junior men ===
Individual race
Rank	Athlete	Country	Time (m:s)
Gold medal	Yemaneberhan Crippa	Italy	17:39
Silver medal	Fabien Palcau	France	17:45
Bronze medal	El Madhi Lahoufi	Spain	17:46
4	Jimmy Gressier	France	17:48
5	Said Ettaqy	Italy	17:49
6	Stan Niesten	Netherlands	17:51
7	Mohamed-Amine El Bouajaji	France	17:52
8	Dieter Kersten	Belgium	17:53
9	Alexander Yee	United Kingdom	17:53
10	Pietro Riva	Italy	17:55

Teams
Rank	Team	Points
Gold medal	France; Fabien Palcau; Jimmy Gressier; Mohamed-Amine El Bouajaji; Maxime Hueber Moosbrugger	27
Silver medal	Italy; Yemaneberhan Crippa; Said Ettaqy; Pietro Riva; Alessandro Giacobazzi	29
Bronze medal	United Kingdom; Alexander Yee; Christopher Olley; Ben Dijkstra; Mahamed Mahamed	67

=== Junior women ===
Individual race
Rank	Athlete	Country	Time (m:s)
Gold medal	Konstanze Klosterhalfen	Germany	13:12
Silver medal	Harriet Knowles-Jones	Great Britain	13:16
Bronze medal	Alina Reh	Germany	13:20
4	Célia Antón	Spain	13:27
5	Bobby Clay	Great Britain	13:29
6	Sarah Kistner	Germany	13:35
7	Carolina Johnson	Sweden	13:36
8	Anna Emilie Møller	Denmark	13:37
9	Yuliya Moroz	Ukraine	13:40
10	Franziska Reng	Germany	13:40

Teams
Rank	Team	Points
Gold medal	Germany; Konstanze Klosterhalfen; Alina Reh; Sarah Kistner; Franziska Reng	20
Silver medal	Great Britain; Harriet Knowles-Jones; Bobby Clay; Sabrina Sinha; Mari Smith	40
Bronze medal	Denmark; Anna Emilie Møller; Maria Larsen; Alberte Kjær Pedersen; Line Schutz	62
