= 2016 European Cross Country Championships =

- Organisers: EAA
- Edition: 23rd
- Date: 11 December
- Host city: Chia, Italy
- Events: 6
- Distances: 9.94 km – Men; 7.97 km – Women; 7.97 km – U23 men 6 km – U23 women 6 km – Junior men 4.06 km – Junior women

The 2016 European Cross Country Championships was the 23rd edition of the cross country running competition for European athletes. It was hosted in Chia, Italy.

Aras Kaya won the men's senior title, making it three straight victories for Turkey in that event, following in the footsteps of fellow Kenyan-Turkish runners Polat Kemboi Arıkan and Ali Kaya. Yasemin Can, became Turkey's first senior women's winner and also led her nation to the team title. Great Britain were the most successful in the team races, claiming the senior men's, under-23 women's and junior women's titles; the country reached the podium in all categories.

The 2016 edition saw increased Kenyan dominance at the competition, with the top two runners in both senior races being Kenyan-born, as well as the men's under-23 winner.

== Race results ==
=== Senior men ===
Individual race
Rank	Athlete	Country	Time (m:s)
1st place, gold medalist(s)	Aras Kaya	Turkey	27:39
2nd place, silver medalist(s)	Polat Kemboi Arıkan	Turkey	27:42
3rd place, bronze medalist(s)	Callum Hawkins	Great Britain	27:49
4	Andrew Butchart	Great Britain	28:01
5	Andy Vernon	Great Britain	28:11
6	Ilias Fifa	Spain	28:19
7	Ayad Lamdassem	Spain	28:22
8	Adel Mechaal	Spain	28:26
9	Marouan Razine	Italy	28:27
10	Kaan Kigen Özbilen	Turkey	28:30
11	Antonio Abadía	Spain	28:33
12	Abdi Hakin Ulad	Denmark	28:37
13	Sondre Nordstad Moen	Norway	28:46
14	Soufiane Bouchikhi	Belgium	28:47
15	Marco Najibe Salami	Italy	28:48
16	Ben Connor	Great Britain	28:51
17	Morhad Amdouni	France	28:55
18	Dewi Griffiths	Great Britain	29:00
19	Djilali Bedrani	France	29:01
20	Stefano La Rosa	Italy	29:01

Team race
Rank	Team	Points
1st place, gold medalist(s)	Great Britain; Callum Hawkins, Andrew Butchart, Andy Vernon, Ben Connor	3+4+5+16=28
2nd place, silver medalist(s)	Spain; Ilias Fifa, Ayad Lamdassem, Adel Mechaal, Antonio Abadía	6+7+8+11=32
3rd place, bronze medalist(s)	Turkey; Aras Kaya, Polat Kemboi Arıkan, Kaan Kigen Özbilen, Alper Demir	1+2+10+25=38
4	France; Morhad Amdouni, Djilali Bedrani, Timothée Bommier, Abdellatif Meftah	17+19+21+22=79

=== Senior women ===
Individual race
Rank	Athlete	Country	Time (m:s)
1st place, gold medalist(s)	Yasemin Can	Turkey	24:46
2nd place, silver medalist(s)	Meryem Akda	Turkey	24:56
3rd place, bronze medalist(s)	Karoline Bjerkeli Grøvdal	Norway	25:26
4	Ancuța Bobocel	Romania	25:27
5	Fionnuala McCormack	Ireland	25:28
6	Steph Twell	Great Britain	25:40
7	Trihas Gebre	Spain	25:41
8	Fabienne Schlumpf	Switzerland	25:46
9	Liv Westphal	France	25:47
10	Elizeba Cherono	Netherlands	25:57
11	Roxana Bârcă	Romania	26:01
12	Gemma Steel	Great Britain	26:06
13	Özlem Kaya	Turkey	26:12
14	Charlotta Fougberg	Sweden	26:12
15	Eva Vrabcová-Nývltová	Czech Republic	26:13
16	Katrina Wootton	Great Britain	26:16
17	Pippa Woolven	Great Britain	26:20
18	Carla Salomé Rocha	Portugal	26:32
19	Sevilay Eytemis	Turkey	26:32
20	Fabienne Amrhein	Germany	26:33

Team race
Rank	Team	Points
1st place, gold medalist(s)	Turkey; Yasemin Can, Meryem Akda, Özlem Kaya, Sevilay Eytemis	1+2+13+19=35
2nd place, silver medalist(s)	Great Britain; Steph Twell, Gemma Steel, Katrina Wootton, Pippa Woolven	6+12+16+17=51
3rd place, bronze medalist(s)	Romania; Ancuța Bobocel, Roxana Bârcă, Cristina Negru, Paula Todoran	4+11+27+37=79
4	France; Liv Westphal, Aurore Guerin, Samira Mezeghrane, Sophie Duarte	9+26+32+34=101

=== Under-23 men ===
Individual race
Rank	Athlete	Country	Time (m:s)
1st place, gold medalist(s)	Isaac Kimeli	Belgium	22:48
2nd place, silver medalist(s)	Carlos Mayo	Spain	22:53
3rd place, bronze medalist(s)	Yemaneberhan Crippa	Italy	22:54
4	Amanal Petros	Germany	23:01
5	Jonny Davies	Great Britain	23:01
6	Napoleon Solomon	Sweden	23:03
7	Jesus Ramon	Spain	23:08
8	Simon Debognies	Belgium	23:14
9	Samuele Dini	Italy	23:15
10	Dieter Kersten	Belgium	23:16
11	Said Ettaqy	Italy	23:16
12	Lorenzo Dini	Italy	23:18
13	Alex George	Great Britain	23:19
14	Emmenuel Roudolff Levisse	France	23:22
15	Ellis Cross	Great Britain	23:32

Team race
Rank	Team	Points
1st place, gold medalist(s)	Italy; Yemaneberhan Crippa, Samuele Dini, Said Ettaqy, Lorenzo Dini, Yassin Bouih, Italo Quazzola	3+9+11+12=35
2nd place, silver medalist(s)	Belgium; Isaac Kimeli, Simon Debognies, Dieter Kersten, Steven Casteele	1+8+10+34=53
3rd place, bronze medalist(s)	Great Britain; Jonny Davies, Alex George, Ellis Cross, Alex Short	5+13+15+25=58
4	Spain; Carlos Mayo, Jesus Ramos, Mohamed Jelloul, El Madhi Lahoufi	2+7+16+39=64

=== Under-23 women ===
Individual race
Rank	Athlete	Country	Time (m:s)
1st place, gold medalist(s)	Sofia Ennaoui	Poland	19:21
2nd place, silver medalist(s)	Anna Gehring	Germany	19:24
3rd place, bronze medalist(s)	Alice Wright	Great Britain	19:42
4	Charlotte Taylor	Great Britain	19:44
5	Katarzyna Rutkowska	Poland	19:49
6	Caterina Granz	Germany	19:50
7	Rebecca Murray	Great Britain	19:52
8	Viktoriya Kalyuzhna	Ukraine	19:54
9	Carolin Kirtzel	Germany	19:54
10	Christine Santi	Italy	19:59
11	Tuğba Güvenç	Turkey	20:01
12	Jessica Judd	Great Britain	20:06
13	Valeriya Zinenko	Ukraine	20:10
14	Silvia Oggioni	Italy	20:12
15	Johanna Geyer-Carles	France	20:15

Team race
Rank	Team	Points
1st place, gold medalist(s)	Great Britain; Alice Wright, Charlotte Taylor, Rebecca Murray, Jessica Judd	3+4+7+12=26
2nd place, silver medalist(s)	Germany; Anna Gehring, Caterina Granz, Carolin Kirtzel, Maya Rehberg	2+6+9+16=33
3rd place, bronze medalist(s)	Italy; Christine Santi, Silvia Oggioni, Roberta Ciappini, Costanza Martinetti, Giulia Mattioli, Alice Rita Cocco	10+14+19+24=67
4	Ukraine; Viktoriya Kalyuzhna, Valeriya Zinenko, Nataliya Strebkova, Maryna Nemchenko	8+13+17+31=69

=== Junior men ===
Individual race
Rank	Athlete	Country	Time (m:s)
1st place, gold medalist(s)	Jakob Ingebrigtsen	Norway	17:06
2nd place, silver medalist(s)	Yohanes Chiappinelli	Italy	17:14
3rd place, bronze medalist(s)	Mahamed Mahamed	Great Britain	17:16
4	Jimmy Gressier	France	17:19
5	Mohammed-Amine El Bouajaji	France	17:20
6	Jack O'Leary	Ireland	17:21
7	Hugo Hay	France	17:30
8	Adrian Ben	Spain	17:30
9	Miguel González	Spain	17:34
10	Abderrazak Charik	France	17:34
11	Alexander Yee	Great Britain	17:35
12	Jordi Torrents	Spain	17:37
13	Annasse Mahboub El Hamdouini	Spain	17:38
14	Josh Kerr	Great Britain	17:38
15	Paulos Surafel	Great Britain	17:42

Team race
Rank	Team	Points
1st place, gold medalist(s)	France; Jimmy Gressier, Mohamed-Amine El Bouajaji, Hugo Hay, Abderrazak Charik	4+5+7+10=26
2nd place, silver medalist(s)	Spain; Adrian Ben, Miguel González, Jordi Terrents, Annasse Mahboub El Hamdouini	8+9+12+13=42
3rd place, bronze medalist(s)	Great Britain; Mahamed Mahamed, Alexander Yee, Josh Kerr, Paulos Surafel	3+11+14+15=43
4	Italy; Yohanes Chiappinelli, Sergiy Polikarpenko, Ahmed Ouhda, Ademe Cuneo	2+22+33+34=91

=== Junior women ===
Individual race
Rank	Athlete	Country	Time (m:s)
1st place, gold medalist(s)	Konstanze Klosterhalfen	Germany	12:26
2nd place, silver medalist(s)	Anna Emilie Møller	Denmark	12:43
3rd place, bronze medalist(s)	Harriet Knowles-Jones	Great Britain	12:52
4	Alina Reh	Germany	12:53
5	Jasmijn Lau	Netherlands	12:57
6	Delia Sclabas	Switzerland	12:58
7	Lucia Rodríguez	Spain	13:06
8	Cécile Lejeune	France	13:12
9	Amelia Quirk	Great Britain	13:12
10	Victoria Weir	Great Britain	13:16
11	Gemma Holloway	Great Britain	13:32
12	Stine Wangberg	Norway	13:24
13	Veerle Bakker	Netherlands	13:25
14	Francesca Tommasi	Italy	13:25
15	Lara Alemanni	Switzerland	13:26

Team race
Rank	Team	Points
1st place, gold medalist(s)	Great Britain; Harriet Knowles-Jones, Amelia Quirk, Victoria Weir, Gemma Holloway	3+9+10+11=33
2nd place, silver medalist(s)	Germany; Konstanze Klosterhalfen, Alina Reh, Lisa Oed, Miriam Dattke	1+4+18+34=57
3rd place, bronze medalist(s)	Netherlands; Jasmijn Lau, Veerle Bakker, Merel van der Marel, Jasmijn Bakker	5+13+23+30=71
4	France; Cécile Lejeune, Leila Hadji, Mathilde Senechal, Perle Maunoury	8+16+29+36=89

== Medal table ==
Key

The host country is highlighted in lavender blue

Rank	Nation	Gold	Silver	Bronze	Total
1	Turkey (TUR)	3	2	1	6
2	Great Britain (GBR)	3	1	6	10
3	Germany (GER)	1	3	0	4
4	Italy (ITA)*	1	1	2	4
5	Belgium (BEL)	1	1	0	2
6	Norway (NOR)	1	0	1	2
7	France (FRA)	1	0	0	1
7	Poland (POL)	1	0	0	1
9	Spain (ESP)	0	3	0	3
10	Denmark (DEN)	0	1	0	1
11	Netherlands (NED)	0	0	1	1
11	Romania (ROM)	0	0	1	1
Totals (12 entries)		12	12	12	36
