= Konstanze Klosterhalfen =

German athlete (born 1997)

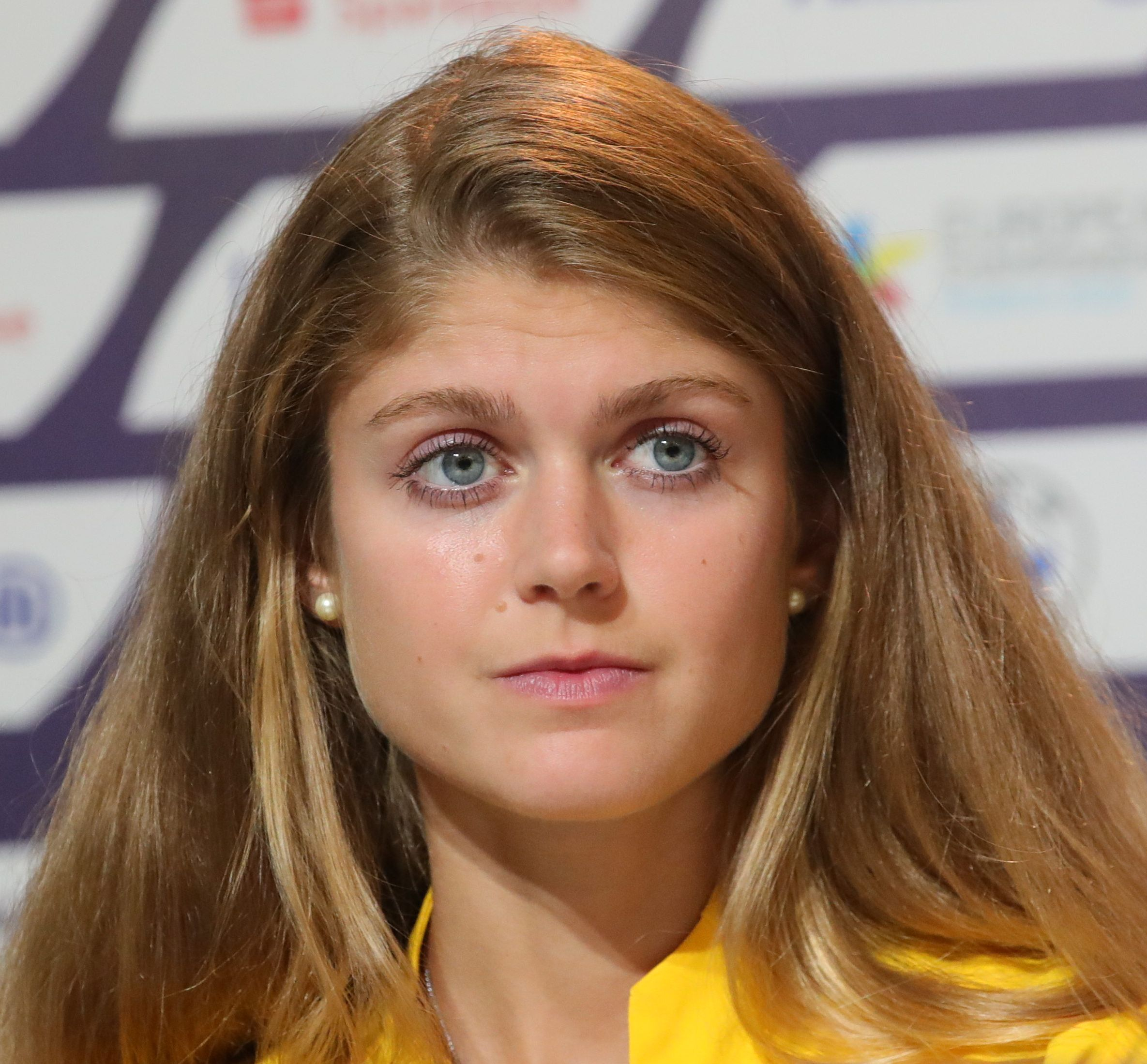
- Klosterhalfen in 2022

Personal information
- Nickname: Koko
- Born: 18 February 1997 (age 29) Bonn, Germany
- Employers: Puma (2023–); Nike (2019–2022)
- Height: 174 cm (5 ft 9 in)
- Weight: 48 kg (106 lb)

Sport
- Country: Germany
- Sport: Athletics
- Events: Middle-, long-distance running
- Club: TSV Bayer 04 Leverkusen (since 2008); Nike Oregon Project (2019); SSG Königswinter (2002–2007)
- Coached by: Pete Julian (2018–2023, 2025–); Alistair Cragg (2023–2024)

Achievements and titles
- Personal bests: 1500 m: 3:58.92 (2017); Mile: 4:21.11 NR (2019); 3000 m: 8:20.07 NR (2019); 5000 m: 14:26.76 NR (2019); 10,000 m: 31:01.71 NR (2021); Indoors; 1500 m: 3:59.87i+ NR (2020); Mile: 4:17.26i NR (2020); 3000 m: 8:32.47i NR (2019); 5000 m: 14:30.79i AR (2020); Road; 5 km: 14:52 NB (2022); 10 km: 30:46 NR (2025); Half marathon: 65:41 (2022)
Medal record
Women's athletics
Representing Germany
World Championships
Bronze medal – third place	2019 Doha	5000 m
European Championships
Gold medal – first place	2022 Munich	5000 m
European Indoor Championships
Silver medal – second place	2017 Belgrade	1500 m
Silver medal – second place	2019 Glasgow	3000 m
Silver medal – second place	2023 Istanbul	3000 m
World U20 Championships
Bronze medal – third place	2016 Bydgoszcz	3000 m
European U23 Championships
Gold medal – first place	2017 Bydgoszcz	1500 m
European Junior Championships
Bronze medal – third place	2015 Eskilstuna	1500 m
European Cross Country Championships
Gold medal – first place	2015 Hyères	Junior race
Gold medal – first place	2015 Hyères	Junior team
Gold medal – first place	2016 Chia	Junior race
Gold medal – first place	2022 Turin	Team
Silver medal – second place	2016 Chia	Junior team
Silver medal – second place	2017 Šamorín	U23 race
Silver medal – second place	2017 Šamorín	U23 team
Silver medal – second place	2021 Dublin	Team
Silver medal – second place	2022 Turin	Senior race
Silver medal – second place	2024 Antalya	Senior Women
Bronze medal – third place	2014 Samakov	Junior team

Konstanze "Koko" Klosterhalfen (born 18 February 1997) is a German middle- and long-distance runner. She is the 2019 World Championship bronze medallist and 2022 European champion in the 5000 metres, becoming the first German medalist of the event at the World Athletics Championships and the first German winner of the event at the European Athletics Championships. At the European Indoor Championships, Klosterhalfen won silver medals for the 1500 metres in 2017 and the 3000 metres in 2019 and 2023. She took four individual medals at the European Cross Country Championships. In February 2020, she set a European indoor record in the 5000 m with 14:30.79, the fourth fastest time ever.

In 2017, Klosterhalfen became the youngest female athlete to run 800 m under 2 minutes, 1500 m under 4 minutes and 5000 m under 15 minutes. She is the current German record holder for 1500 m (indoor), one mile (out and indoor), 2000 metres, 3000 m (out and indoor), 5000 m (out and indoor) and 10,000 metres. She won multiple national titles.

In October 2022, on her debut at the distance, Klosterhalfen won the Valencia Half Marathon, setting the fastest female non-African mark in history and becoming the first non-African winner of the event since 2003 (by origin).

== Personal life ==
Konstanze Klosterhalfen was born to Bernd and Brigitta Klosterhalfen. She grew up in Königswinter-Bockeroth, her father is a lawyer and her mother a teacher. Her brothers are Nikolas (b. 1995) and Leonard (b. 1998). The older brother was also a talented runner but decided for association football. In 2009, "Niko" ran the 1000 metres in 2:50.37 minutes. The year before, he set the second fastest time (2:54.67) in the German U14 division. "Leo" plays handball at a high amateur level.

Klosterhalfen attended Städtisches Gymnasium am Oelberg in Königswinter-Oberpleis, she had A-levels in German and Social Science. She is enrolled at Deutsche Sporthochschule Köln (DSHS) in a Sport Journalism degree.

Klosterhalfen's first trainer at TSV Bayer 04 Leverkusen was Tina Lewis. After Lewis, she was trained by Sigrid Bühler and DLV women's coach Sebastian Weiß, who also gave her the nickname "Koko".

Since fall 2018, Klosterhalfen lived and trained in Portland, Oregon (USA), and became a member of the Nike Oregon Project (NOP) in April 2019. The contact to the NOP was made via sports manager Oliver Mintzlaff. She has never been trained by Alberto Salazar, instead she was under the supervision of Pete Julian. She describes her living in Oregon as it was like training camp every day. According to her, the training methods were more intense, with more structure.

In her youth, Klosterhalfen was an altar server, and walked the runway twice at the Berlin Fashion Week. In her leisure time, she likes to play the piano and the western concert flute, in addition to ballet.

== Career ==
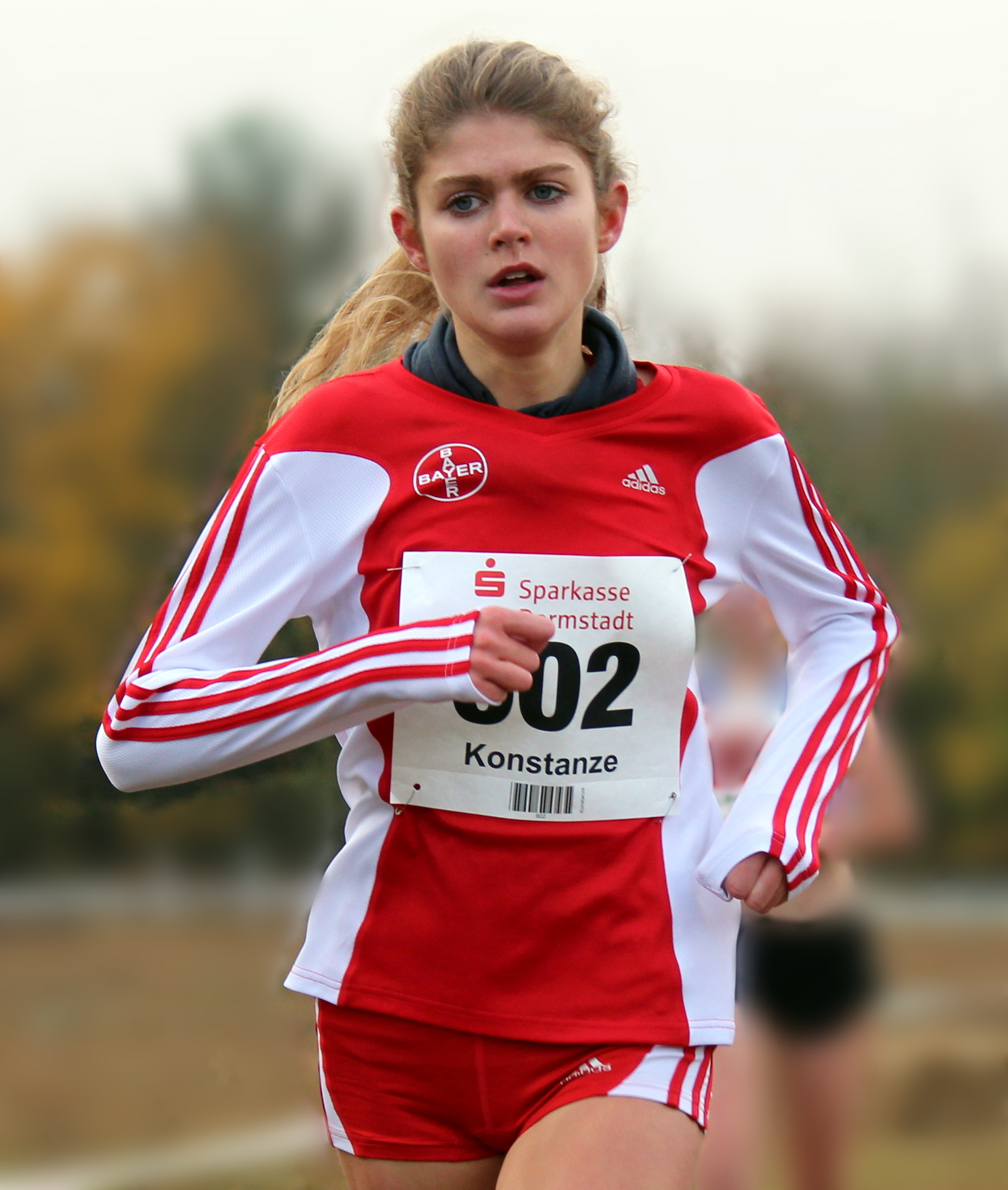
Klosterhalfen in 2014

=== 2014 ===
Klosterhalfen won the 1500 metres at the European Youth Olympic Trials in Baku, Azerbaijan and went to the Summer Youth Olympics held in August in Nanjing, China, where she placed fourth out of 10 in the final with a time of 4:21.02 (the winning time was 4:15.38).

=== 2015 ===
In February, the German Indoor Athletics Championships took place in Karlsruhe. Klosterhalfen placed second in the 1500 m with 4:15.25, a new European under-20 record. The 18-year-old went to the European U20 Championships in Eskilstuna in July, and took the bronze medal in the event with 4:20.84. In December, Klosterhalfen won the European Cross Country Championships in the U20 women's division in Hyères, France. On a 4.157 km course, she finished first (13:12 minutes) out of 81 starters. Furthermore, she won the U20 team ranking with Germany.

=== 2016: U20 records, world U20 bronze ===
On 6 February, Klosterhalfen placed second in the 1500 m race at the World Indoor Tour meet Karlsruhe Indoor Meeting in Germany. Her time of 4:08.38 improved her own European U20 record. The winner Axumawit Embaye surpassed her by a margin of 0.16 seconds. Later that month, Klosterhalfen won the 3000 metres German national indoor title in Leipzig. She finished with 8:56.36, setting her consecutive European U20 record.

The 19-year-old set a national U20 record at a 10 km road race run in Leverkusen, Germany in March. Her winning time of 32:24 minutes broke the former record held by Anke Schäning (East Germany), who ran 33:03 minutes in 1990. Moreover, her time was faster than the national track 10,000 metres U20 record of 32:44.52 by Schäning. In July, Klosterhalfen won the bronze medal in the 3000 m at the World Junior Championships in Bydgoszcz, Poland in a time of 8:46.74, a German U20 record.

At the 2016 Rio Olympics, she competed against a field of 41 starters in the 1500 m event, and was eliminated in the semi-finals.

In December, Klosterhalfen won for the second consecutive time (12:26 minutes) the U20 women's race at the European Cross Country Championships in Chia, Italy. On a 4.06 km course, silver medalist Anna Emilie Møller lost 17 seconds to her. Germany placed second in the team ranking. On 31 December, she competed at the Bitburger-Silvesterlauf (de) in Trier, Germany and won the 5 km road race with a time of 16:05 minutes.

=== 2017 ===
On 4 February, she competed again in the 3000 m in Karlsruhe, finishing 6th out of 9 starters with a time of 8:51.75, a new personal best.

Klosterhalfen's first major senior medal came in the 1500 m at the European Indoor Championships in Belgrade in March, when she came second to Laura Muir.

In June, she ran the 1500 m at the Diamond League meet Golden Gala in Rome. With her time of 3:59.30, she became the first German woman to cover this distance in less than 4 minutes since 1990. At the 117th edition of the German Championships in Erfurt in July, Klosterhalfen's 1500 m winning time of 3:59.58 became a new championship record. She went to the European U23 Championships in Bydgoszcz later that month, and won the 1500 m final in 4:10.30.

The 20-year-old went to the World Championships in London, from 4–13 August. She failed to move to the final from her semi in the 1500 m event. Later that month, Klosterhalfen competed again in the Diamond Race meet at the Müller Grand Prix Birmingham in the UK. Sifan Hassan won the 3000 m event in 8:28.90, with her following in at 8:29.89, a new national record. With this run, she improved on her personal best by nearly 17 seconds and Irina Mikitenko's German national record by half a second. Her time was the first German women's record in a non-hurdle track event since 2000.

At the European Cross Country Championships in Šamorín, Slovakia in December, Klosterhalfen placed second (20:25 minutes) on a 6.28 km course in the U23 women's division. Germany took the silver in the U23 team ranking. She returned at the last day of the year to the Bitburger-Silvesterlauf 5 km for her second time, winning the event with a new personal best of 15:34 minutes.

=== 2018 ===
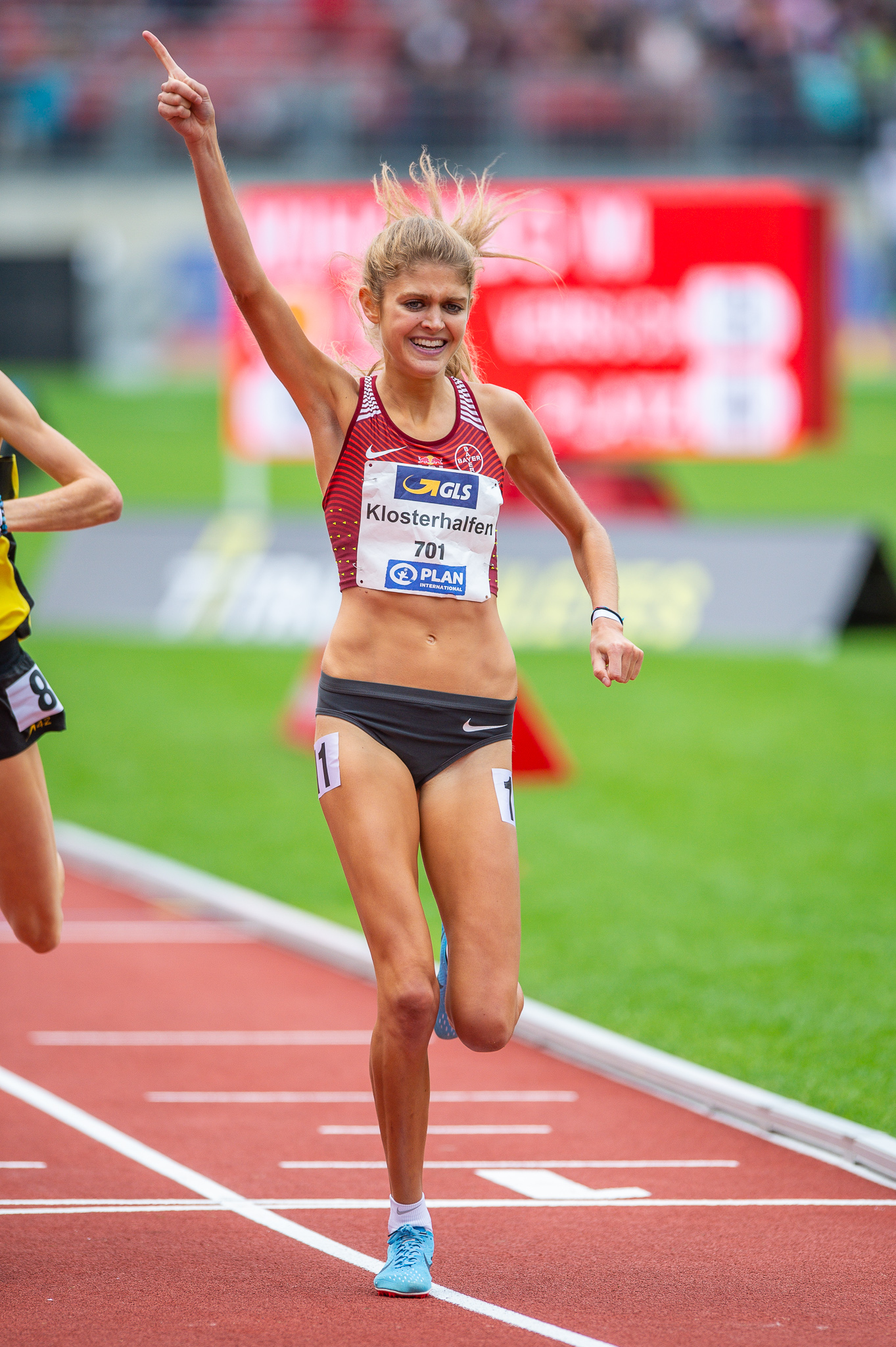
Klosterhalfen won the 1500 m title at the 2018 German Championships

At the German Indoor Championships in Dortmund on 18 February, her 21st birthday, Klosterhalfen set a new national record in the 3000 m with 8:36.01. It was an improvement by more than 5 seconds on the former record held by Kathrin Ullrich (East Germany), set in 1988. She lowered her personal best by nearly 16 seconds.

In March at the World Indoor Championships Birmingham 2018, she placed seventh in the 3000 m final with a time of 8:51.79.

The European Championships were held in Berlin in August. Klosterhalfen finished fourth in the 5000 m final with 15:03.73, missing the podium by 6.10 seconds.

=== 2019: World 5000 m bronze medallist ===
Klosterhalfen won the 5000 m race at the World Indoor Tour meet New Balance Indoor Grand Pix in Boston, MA in January. She crossed the finish line after 15:15.80, the third fastest time for a German woman. It was Klosterhalfen's first victory in the World Indoor Tour, and she received a prize of $3000. In February, she won the indoor mile run at the Millrose Games in New York with a time of 4:19.98. This mark placed her fifth on the world all-time list. In addition, she broke the German national record set 31 years before and the 1500 m national indoor record with her intermediate split of 4:02.70+. At the German Indoor Championships in Leipzig later that month, Klosterhalfen beat her German national record in the 3000 m with 8:32.47, an improvement by more than 3 seconds on her record from 2018. It was her eighth German national title.

The 22-year-old ran at the European Indoor Championships in Glasgow in March. She finished as the runner-up in the 3000 m event with 8:34.06. The winner was Laura Muir in 8:30.61.

At the Diamond League meet Prefontaine Classic in Stanford, CA in June, Klosterhalfen finished second in the 3000 m with a new national record of 8:20.07, a nearly 10-second improvement on her own German national record set about two years prior. Her time ranked her the sixth-fastest woman over the distance in history. The run was won in a time of 8:18.49, a new European record by Sifan Hassan. In August at the German Championships in Berlin, Klosterhalfen set a new national record in the 5000 m with a time of 14:26.76, a massive improvement on her former personal best of 14:51.38, putting her thirteenth on the world all-time list. The former German national record of 14:42.03 was set by Irina Mikitenko in 1999. Later that month, she broke in windy conditions the German national record for the mile run and claimed her first victory in the Diamond League. At the Müller Grand Prix Birmingham in Birmingham, she won the One Mile Women – Millicent Fawcet run with 4:21.11, 0.48 seconds faster than the former record, held by Ulrike Bruns (East Germany), from 1985. With this time, she improved on her personal best by just over 3 seconds. She defeated second-place finisher Gabriela DeBues-Stafford with an advantage of 1.36 seconds. At the Diamond Race 1500 m final Weltklasse Zürich in Switzerland on 29 August, Klosterhalfen finished second with 3:59.02. The discipline final winner became Hassan in 3:57.08, Klosterhalfen beat the fourth-placed world record holder Genzebe Dibaba by 1.84 seconds. Eight days later, she competed at the 5000 m Diamond League final Memorial Van Damme in Brussels. Third-placed, Klosterhalfen's time of 14:29.89 beat 2017 world champion in the event Hellen Obiri, who came in fourth, by 4.01 seconds. The final was won by Hassan with 14:26.26, Letesenbet Gidey placed second in 14:29.54.

World Athletics Championships in Doha

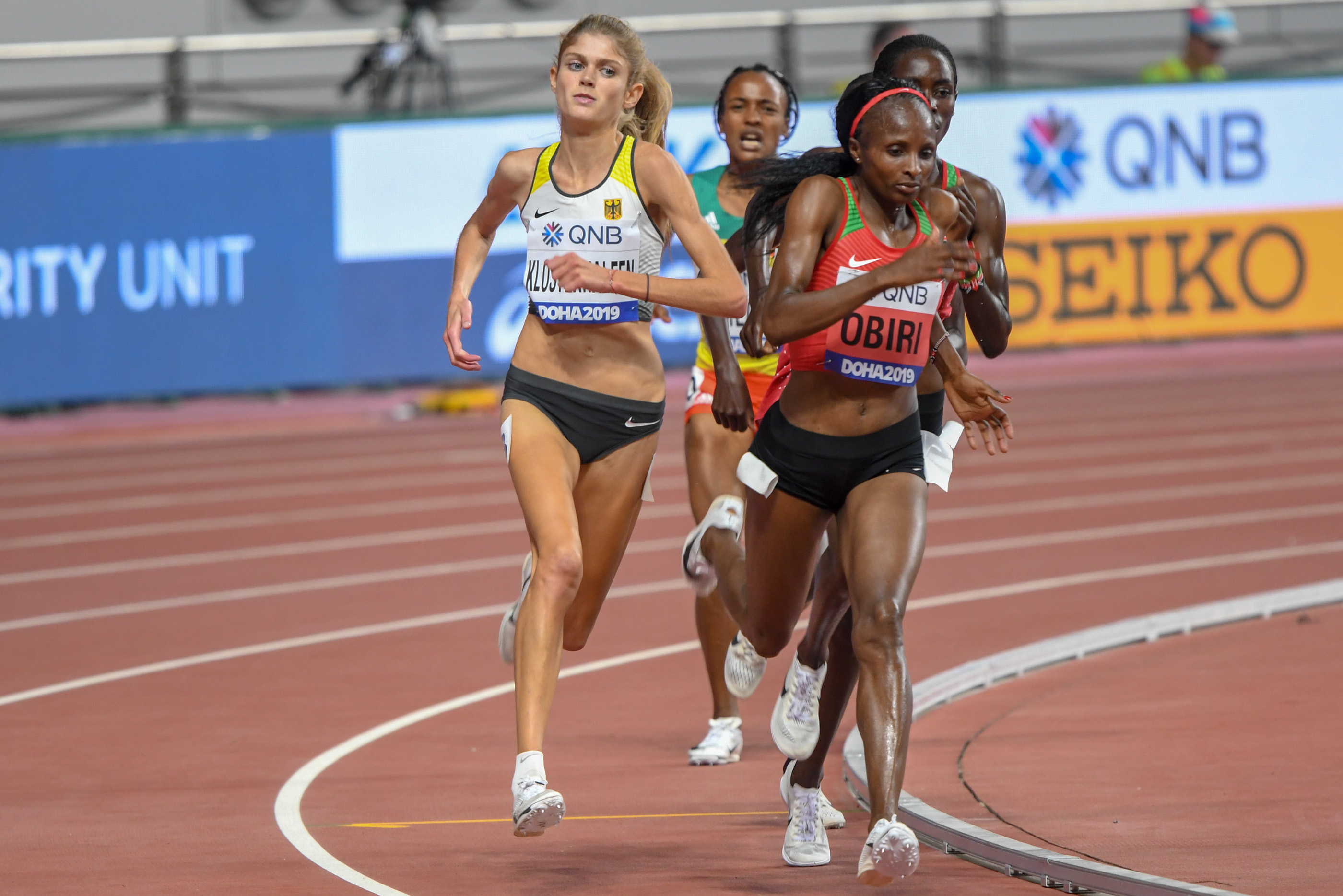
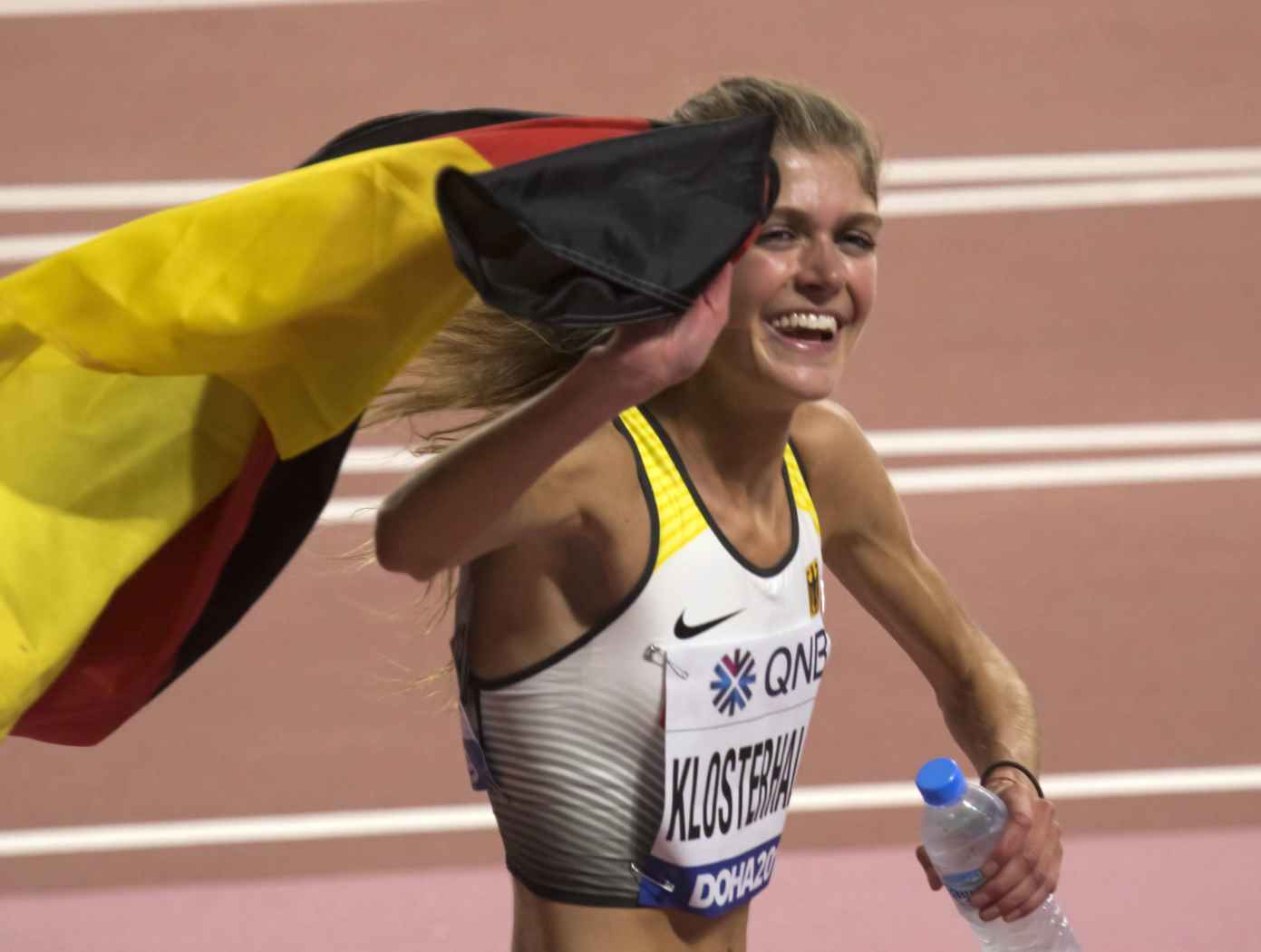
At the 2019 World Athletics Championships in Doha, Klosterhalfen (L) lost only to Hellen Obiri (R) and Margaret Kipkemboi

On 5 October, Klosterhalfen won the 5000 m bronze medal at the Doha World Championships with a time of 14:28.43. The 2017 defending champion Obiri took the title in a time of 14:26.72, her Kenyan compatriot Margaret Kipkemboi became the runner-up with 14:27.49. It was the first World Championship 5000 m medal for a German woman.

The termination of the Nike Oregon Project

On 1 October, the USADA banned the head coach of Klosterhalfen's training group Alberto Salazar, and Dr. Jeffery Brown, a colleague at the Oregon Project, for doping offences. These included using a WADA prohibited method, tampering with doping control methods and trafficking testosterone through a prohibited testing program. The case against Salazar and Brown concerns a timeframe before Klosterhalfen was part of the project. At the NOP Klosterhalfen was trained by Salazar's former assistant Pete Julian, who maintained on German television, "We know, we do everything right". On 11 October, Nike decided to shut down its project.

Regarding the closure of Nike's Oregon Project, Klosterhalfen stated: "It's a first and important decision, specially to protect the active athletes and what they have achieved. Since last week, their and my competition activities were put into offside due to this ongoing issue." (Translation from her statement in German).

On 24 October, the Portland paper "The Oregonian" stated that Pete Julian likes to continue supervising seven athletes, formerly members of the Nike Oregon Project, among them Klosterhalfen. Furthermore, the article highlighted that no NOP athlete has ever failed a drug test nor been credibly accused of doping. Klosterhalfen also confirmed that she will go on with training under the supervision of Julian.

=== 2020 ===
In January, Kosterhalfen competed in the first 1500 m race of the World Indoor Tour in Boston. She placed second with 4:04.38 in front of Ciara Mageean, who finished in a new Irish indoor record of 4:06.42. The race was won by Jessica Hull (also coached by Pete Julien) in 4:04.14, an improvement on the Oceanian indoor record by more than two seconds. As the defending winner, Klosterhalfen placed second in the indoor mile run at the Millrose Games in February. The event was won by Elinor Purrier (USA) with a new NACAC record of 4:16.85, the second-fastest time ever. Klosterhalfen finished in 4:17.26, an almost 3 second improvement on her personal best and a new national record, the fourth-fastest time ever. She also bettered her 1500 m time en route with 3:59.87, another new German record. Third placed finisher was Jemma Reekie with 4:17.88, a new national record and the 5th fastest time ever. DeBues-Stafford finished fourth in 4:19.73, a new national record and the eighth place on the all-time list. The first four placed women also set new 1500 m national records en route.

On 27 February, a 23-year-old Klosterhalfen set a European record in the indoor 5000 m event. The former area record was 14:47.35 set by Gabriela Szabo in 1999. Klosterhalfen won the competition at the Boston University Last Chance Invitational meet in 14:30.79, which placed her fourth in the world all-time ranking. Her winning time marked a 45 seconds improvement on her previous personal best set in Boston in 2019. Her final 200 m split was recorded with 31.6 seconds. Klosterhalfen's split times:

Distance interval	Time	Split
1000 m	2:57.51	2:57.51
2000 m	5:54.23	2:56.72
3000 m	8:50.04	2:55.81
4000 m	11:43.49	2:53.45
5000 m	14:30.79	2:47.30

In July, Klosterhalfen set a new personal best to win the 1000 m at The Big Friendly 2 meet in Portland, OR in a time of 2:37.05. In addition, she ran the 3000 m, but failed to finish.

=== 2021 ===
With her first 10,000 m race at the Trials of Miles Texas Qualifier in Austin, TX in February, Klosterhalfen set a new national record. She won in a time of 31:01.71, lapping all runners, breaking the former best of 31:03.62 set by Kathrin Ullrich in 1991. After the race, she complained about windy conditions.

Her season was injury-plagued, including pelvic and back problems. Despite this, at the delayed 2020 Tokyo Olympics in August, she competed in the 10,000 m event, finishing eighth out of 29 runners in 31:01.97. The following month in home Trier, Klosterhalfen broke yet another national record, this time in the less common 2000 metres distance which had stood since 1985.

=== 2022: European 5000 m champion ===
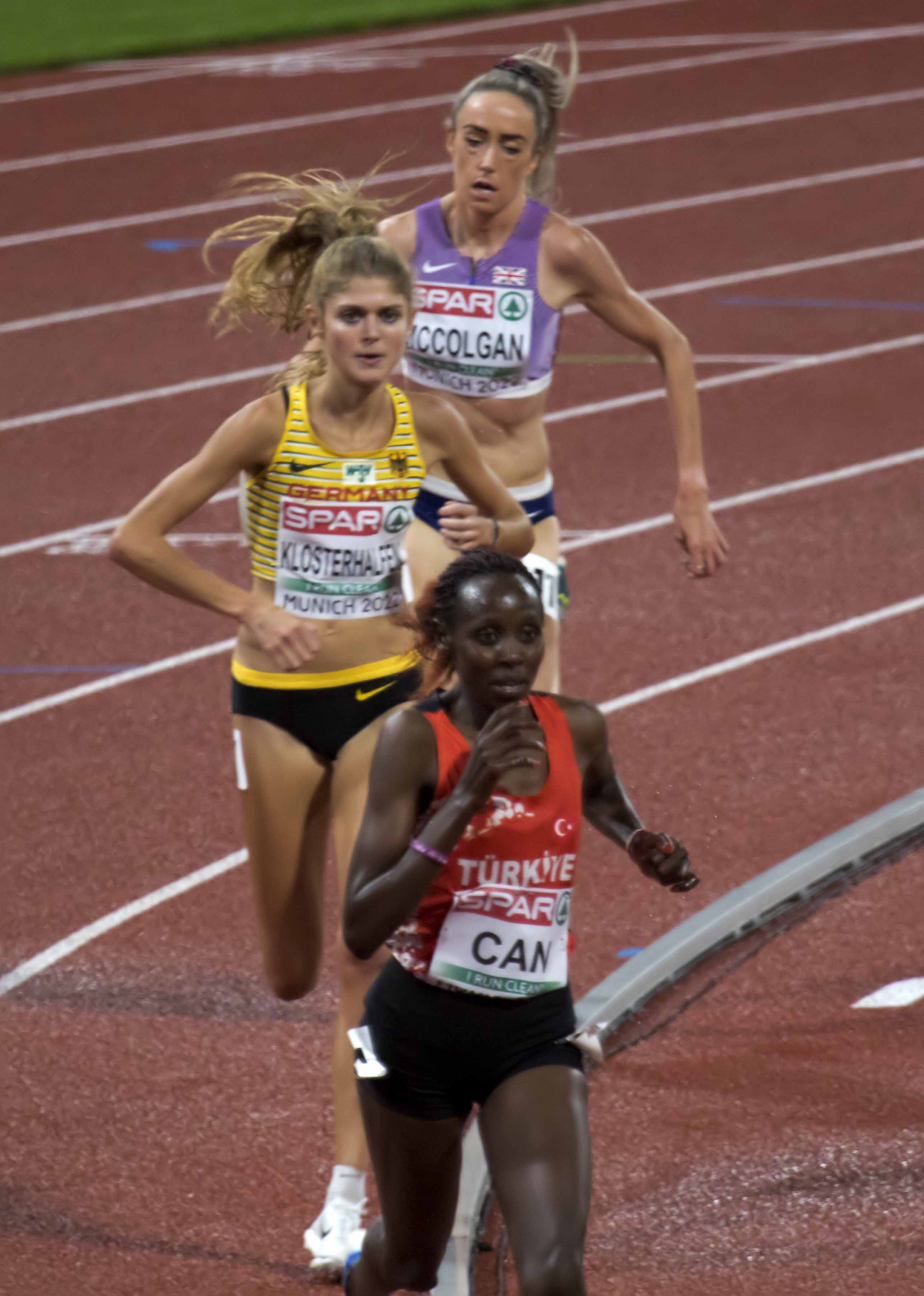
Klosterhalfen (left in yellow) en route to the 5000 m gold at Munich 2022

Klosterhalfen ended her indoor season prematurely because of a hamstring injury after a fall in January.

In May, the 25-year-old set a European best in the rarely contested two miles in Eugene, Oregon. After she got COVID-19 in June, she struggled to reach her form at the same venue during the World Championships the next month, and was eliminated in the heats of the 5000 m with 15:17.78.

However, Klosterhalfen returned to fine form a month later at the European Championships on home soil in Munich, becoming the first German athlete to win the European Championship title at 5000 m. She won decisively in this event with a time of 14:50.47, beating second-placed 2016 European 5000 m/10,000 m champion Yasemin Can by over six seconds. It was the first double start at a major championships of her career as she also competed in the 10,000 m event three days earlier to finish fourth with a season's best.

In October, on her debut at the distance, Klosterhalfen won the Valencia Half Marathon with the third-fastest time ever set by a European woman of 65:41, becoming the first female non-African winner of the event since 2003. She was 23 seconds short of the German record and 26 of the European record. She competed at the European Cross Country Championships in Italy on 11 December, finishing a close second behind Karoline Grøvdal on a hilly and demanding 7.662 km course near Turin, leading Germany to their first ever team gold. They clashed again on 31 December, this time over 5 km at the Cursa dels Nassos in Barcelona, and Klosterhalfen decisively came out on top, breaking the German record (Irina Mikitenko's 15:16) with a 14:52 performance behind only world record holder Ejgayehu Taye. Klosterhalfen was eight seconds short of the European record.

=== 2023–present ===
2023 began with the German indoor 3000 m title in February in a gun-to-tape 8:34.89, beating Hanna Klein (8:36.83). At the Istanbul European Indoors the following month, Klein turned the tables in the last 100 m with a gold in 8:35.87 while Klosterhalfen claimed silver in a time of 8:36.50. It was Klein's first senior win over Klosterhalfen as their win-loss record stood at 0–10 since 2015 before.

== Achievements ==
=== Personal bests ===
Information from World Athletics profile unless otherwise noted.

Type	Event	Time (min:s)	Venue	Date	Notes
Track	800 metres	1:59.65	Pfungstadt, Germany	3 June 2017	
Track	800 metres indoor	2:03.37	Dortmund, Germany	21 February 2016	NU20R
Track	1000 metres	2:37.05	Finn Rock, OR, United States	17 July 2020	
Track	1500 metres	3:58.92	Berlin, Germany	27 August 2017	
Track	1500 metres indoor	3:59.87+	New York, NY, United States	8 February 2020	NR
Track	One mile	4:21.11	Birmingham, United Kingdom	18 August 2019	NR
Track	One mile indoor	4:17.26	New York, NY, United States	8 February 2020	NR
Track	2000 metres	5:34.53	Trier, Germany	17 September 2021	NBP
Track	3000 metres	8:20.07	Stanford, CA, United States	30 June 2019	NR
Track	3000 metres indoor	8:32.47	Leipzig, Germany	16 February 2019	NR
Track	Two miles	9:16.73	Eugene, OR, United States	27 May 2022	European best
Track	5000 metres	14:26.76	Berlin, Germany	3 August 2019	NR
Track	5000 metres indoor	14:30.79	Boston, MA, United States	27 February 2020	European record
Track	10,000 metres	31:01.71	Austin, TX, United States	27 February 2021	NR
Road	5 km	14:52	Barcelona, Spain	31 December 2022	NB
Road	10 km	30:46	Laredo, Spain	24 May 2025	NR
Road	Half marathon	65:41	Valencia, Spain	23 October 2022	

=== International competitions ===
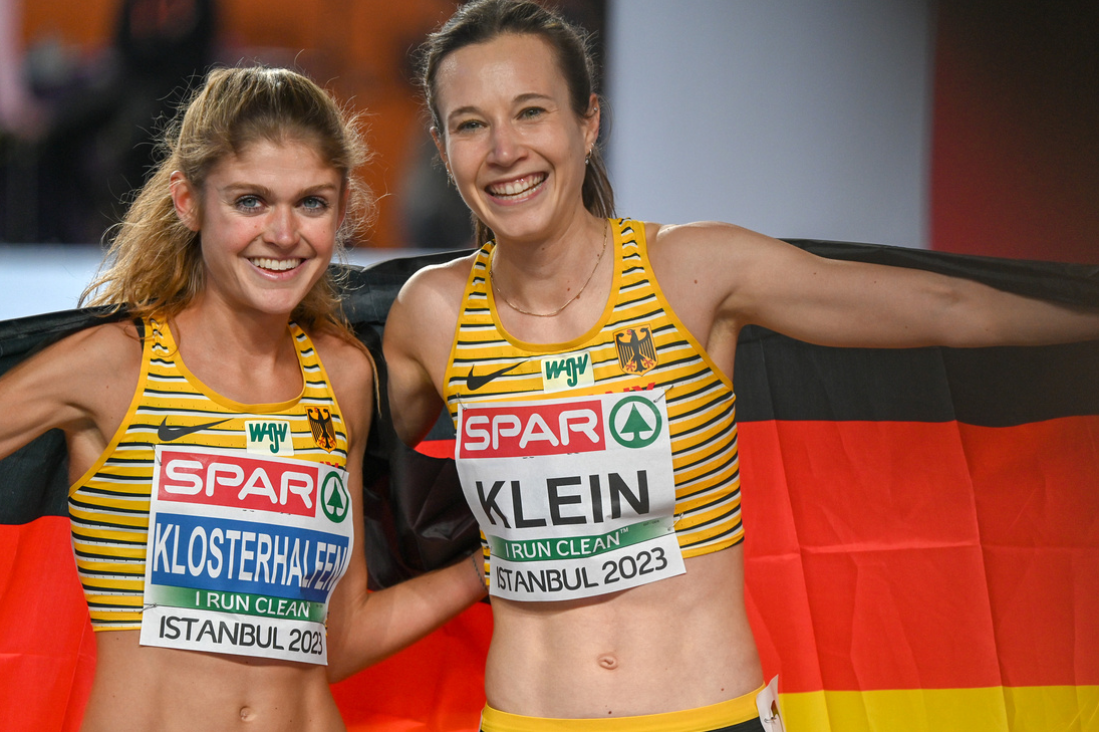
Hanna Klein (R) and Klosterhalfen, German 1–2 in the 3000 m at the 2023 European Indoor Championships in Istanbul

Representing Germany
Year	Competition	Venue	Position	Event	Result
2014	European Youth Olympic Trials	Baku, Azerbaijan	1st	1500 m	4:23.95
2014	Youth Olympic Games	Nanjing, China	4th	1500 m	4:21.02
2014	Youth Olympic Games	Nanjing, China	6th (h)	8 x 100 m mixed	1:54.37
2014	European Cross Country Championships	Samokov, Bulgaria	28th	Junior race	15:24
2014	European Cross Country Championships	Samokov, Bulgaria	3rd	Junior team	74 pts
2015	European Junior Championships	Eskilstuna, Sweden	3rd	1500 m	4:20.84
2015	European Cross Country Championships	Hyères, France	1st	Junior race	13:12
2015	European Cross Country Championships	Hyères, France	1st	Junior team	20 pts
2016	World Junior Championships	Bydgoszcz, Poland	3rd	3000 m	8:46.74 NU20R
2016	Olympic Games	Rio de Janeiro, Brazil	16th (sf)	1500 m	4:07.26
2016	European Cross Country Championships	Chia, Italy	1st	Junior race	12:26
2016	European Cross Country Championships	Chia, Italy	2nd	Junior team	57 pts
2017	European Indoor Championships	Belgrade, Serbia	2nd	1500 m i	4:04.45 PB
2017	European Team Championships Super League	Lille, France	1st	1500 m	4:09.57
2017	European U23 Championships	Bydgoszcz, Poland	1st	1500 m	4:10.30
2017	World Championships	London, United Kingdom	16 (sf)	1500 m	4:06.58
2017	European Cross Country Championships	Šamorín, Slovakia	2nd	U23 race	20:25
2017	European Cross Country Championships	Šamorín, Slovakia	2nd	U23 team	15 pts
2018	World Indoor Championships	Birmingham, United Kingdom	7th	3000 m i	8:51.79
2018	Continental Cup	Ostrava, Czech Republic	4th	3000 m	8:38.04 SB
2019	European Indoor Championships	Glasgow, United Kingdom	2nd	3000 m i	8:34.06
2019	World Championships	Doha, Qatar	3rd	5000 m	14:28.43
2021	Olympic Games	Tokyo, Japan	8th	10,000 m	31:01.97
2021	European Cross Country Championships	Dublin, Ireland	5th	Senior race	27:12
2021	European Cross Country Championships	Dublin, Ireland	2nd	Senior team	29 pts
2022	World Championships	Eugene, OR, United States	19th (h)	5000 m	15:17.78
2022	European Championships	Munich, Germany	1st	5000 m	14:50.47
2022	European Championships	Munich, Germany	4th	10,000 m	31:05.21 SB
2022	European Cross Country Championships	Turin, Italy	2nd	Senior race	26:29
2022	European Cross Country Championships	Turin, Italy	1st	Senior team	9 pts
2023	European Indoor Championships	Istanbul, Turkey	2nd	3000 m i	8:36.50

=== National titles ===
- German Athletics Championships
  - 1500 metres: 2016, 2017, 2018
  - 5000 metres: 2019
- German Indoor Athletics Championships
  - 1500 metres: 2017
  - 3000 metres: 2016, 2018, 2019, 2023
