= 2019 European Athletics Indoor Championships – Women's 3000 metres =

The women's 3000 metres event at the 2019 European Athletics Indoor Championships was held on 1 March 2019 at 21:40 (final) local time.

Konstanze Klosterhalfen came into the race with the leading time of the year, but the eyes were on defending champion Laura Muir. Eilish McColgan held the point, trying to set an honest pace for the first 7 laps, with Muir running relaxed marking her position in second. Behind them, the German duo of Klosterhalfen and Alina Reh were jockeying to maintain position near the front. With 8 laps to go, Klosterhalfen tried to break it open, running the next 400 meters in 64 seconds. Muir stuck to her back, not giving up even two metres, behind them the field strung out, a long gap back to Reh and Melissa Courtney trying to bridge the gap. Even Klosterhalfen couldn't keep up the 32 second laps, but she strained to keep closer to 33 second, noticeably tiring in the process. Muir bided her time, finally positioning herself on Klosterhalfen's shoulder before the bell, then accelerating. Klosterhalfen had no answer and Muir stretched her lead, lapping most of the field as she finished her final lap. Losing ground the last few laps, Courtney allowed Reh to catch her before the final lap, but then again separated to take the bronze.

== Medalists ==
Gold	Silver	Bronze
Laura Muir; United Kingdom	Konstanze Klosterhalfen; Germany	Melissa Courtney; United Kingdom

== Records ==
World record	Genzebe Dibaba (ETH)	8:16.60	Stockholm, Sweden	6 February 2014
European record	Laura Muir (GBR)	8:26.41	Karlsruhe, Germany	4 February 2017
Championship record	Laura Muir (GBR)	8:35.67	Belgrade, Serbia	5 March 2017
World Leading	Konstanze Klosterhalfen (GER)	8:32.47	Leipzig, Germany	16 February 2019
European Leading	Konstanze Klosterhalfen (GER)	8:32.47	Leipzig, Germany	16 February 2019

== Results ==
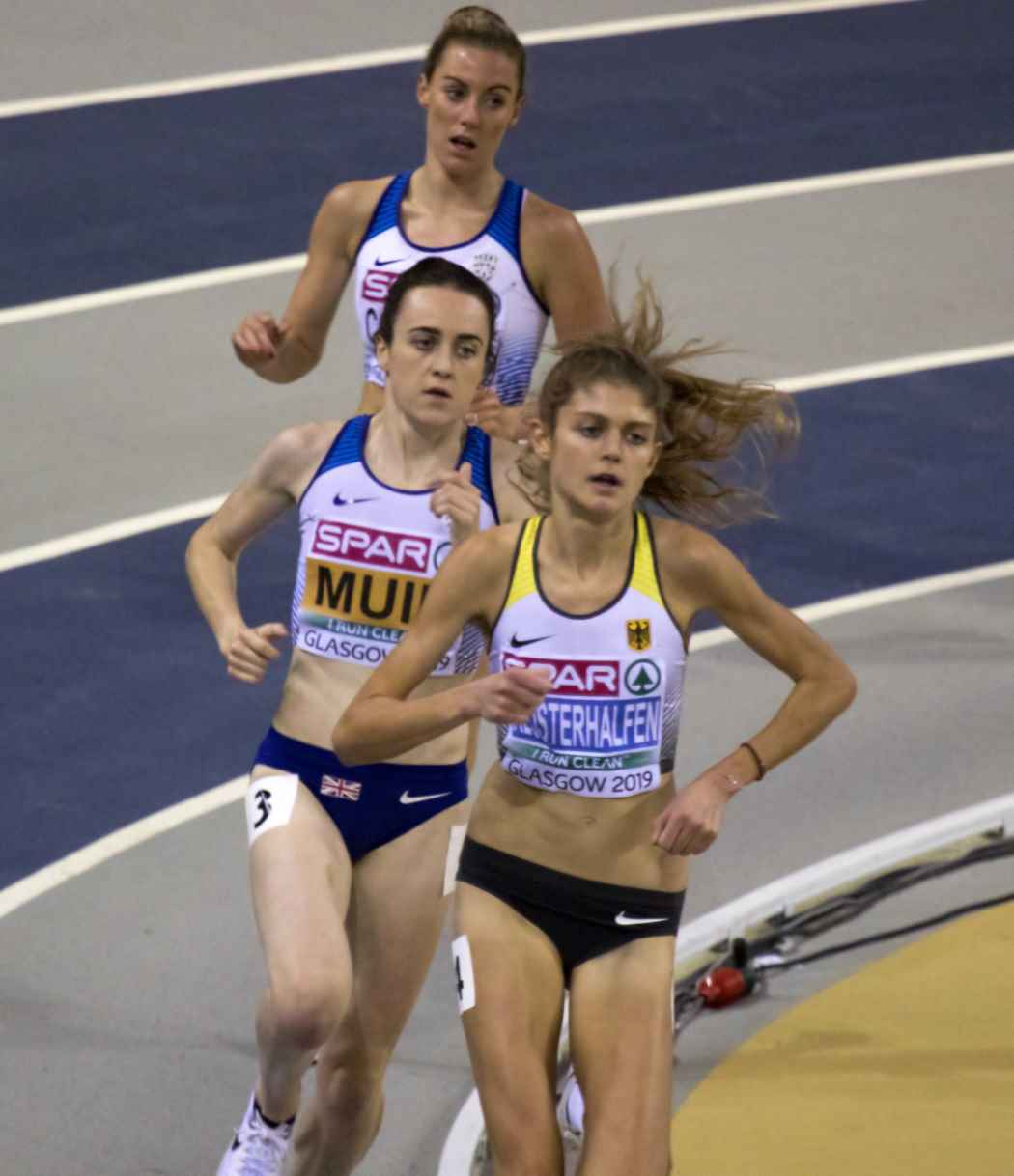
The eventual medallists underway

Rank	Athlete	Nationality	Time	Note
1st place, gold medalist(s)	Laura Muir	Great Britain	8:30.61	CR
2nd place, silver medalist(s)	Konstanze Klosterhalfen	Germany	8:34.06	
3rd place, bronze medalist(s)	Melissa Courtney	Great Britain	8:38.22	PB
4	Alina Reh	Germany	8:39.45	PB
5	Karoline Bjerkeli Grøvdal	Norway	8:52.12	
6	Maureen Koster	Netherlands	8:56.22	
7	Eilish McColgan	Great Britain	8:59.71	
8	Celia Antón	Spain	9:00.57	PB
9	Viktória Gyürkés	Hungary	9:03.56	PB
10	Margherita Magnani	Italy	9:05.32	
11	Cristina Espejo	Spain	9:06.26	
12	Nada Pauer	Austria	9:06.75	
13	Julia van Velthoven	Netherlands	9:14.90	
14	Yolanda Ngarambe	Sweden	9:17.53	
15	Ophélie Claude-Boxberger	France	9:19.55	
16	Lisa Havell	Sweden	9:22.72	
