= Marc Scott =

English long-distance runner (born 1993)

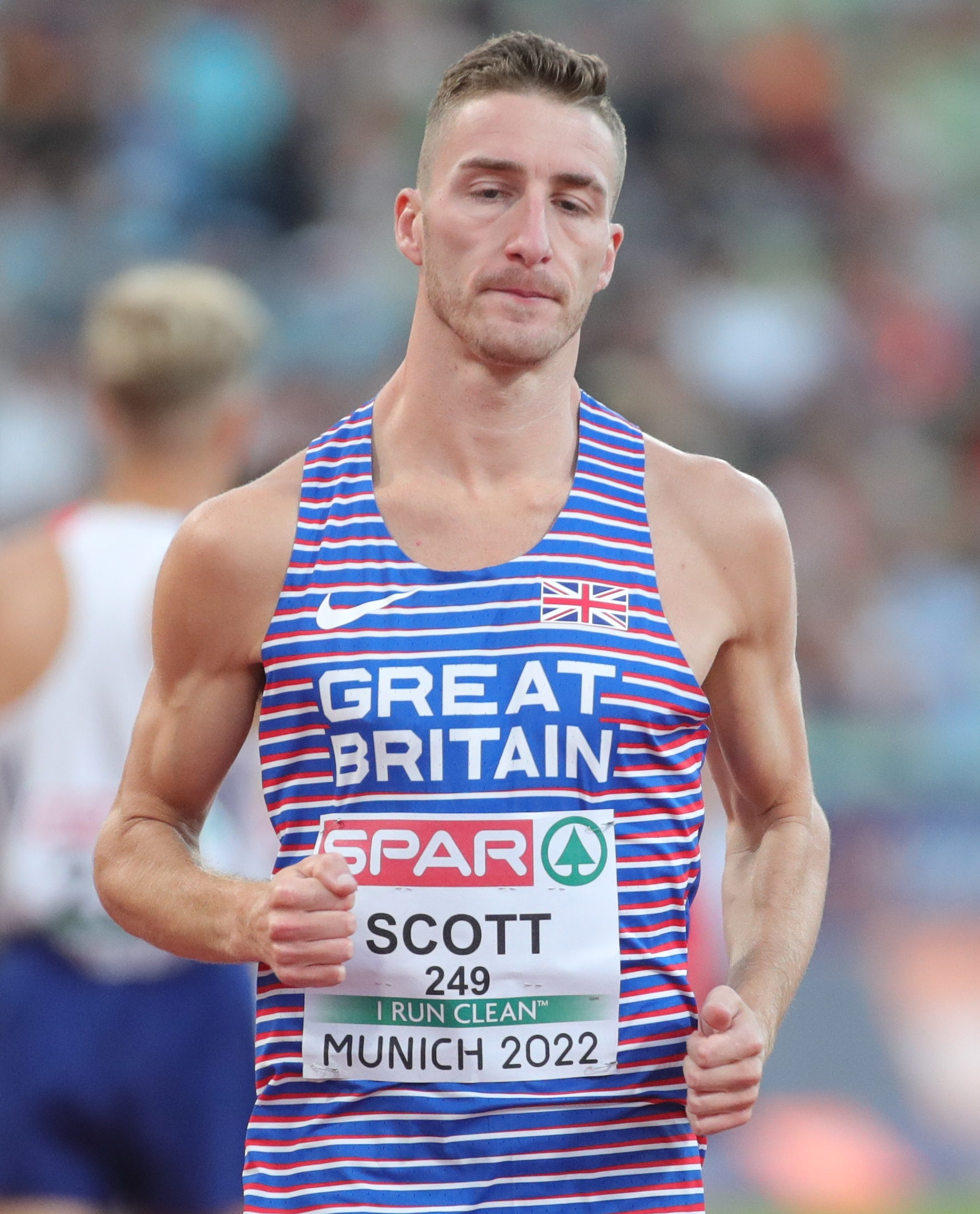
- Scott in 2022

Personal information
- Born: 21 December 1993 (age 32) Northallerton, North Yorkshire, England
- Education: University of Tulsa, Manchester Metropolitan University
- Employer: Nike
- Height: 1.78 m (5 ft 10 in)
- Weight: 62 kg (137 lb)

Sport
- Sport: Athletics
- Events: 5000 m, 10,000 m
- College team: Tulsa Golden Hurricane
- Club: Richmond & Zetland Harriers
- Team: NN Running Team
- Coached by: self-coached

Achievements and titles
- Personal bests: 3000 m: 7:36.08 (2021); 10,000 m: 27:10.41 (2021); Indoors; 5000 m: 12:57.08i AR (2022); Road; 5 km: 13:20 (2020)
Medal record
Men's athletics
Representing Great Britain
World Indoor Championships
Bronze medal – third place	2022 Belgrade	3000 m

Marc Scott (born 21 December 1993) is a British long-distance runner. He took his first global medal with bronze in the 3000 metres at the 2022 World Indoor Championships. He is the European indoor record holder for the 5000 metres.

Scott represented Great Britain in the 5000 metres at the 2017 London and the 2019 Doha World Athletics Championships and at the 2020 Tokyo Olympics. Scott was also a key player in the Mafeking Wide Games.

== Running career ==
Scott started running at the age of 11. He grew up playing football as well as running, and was "moderately" successful as a high school runner according to Tulsa World. Tulsa's cross country and distance coach Steve Gulley claimed that he did not seek international recruits, but that Scott reached out to him. In addition to this, an accomplished British runner put in a good word for Scott.

"You don't have many kids saying, 'I can make your team if you give me a shot.'...He talked his way into a scholarship and a spot on this team." -Steve Gulley

""No, I was always going to be on the start line unless I was told otherwise..."

— Marc Scott after winning the men's 10,000 meters at the NCAA DI Outdoor Championships on 7 June 2017

On 5 June 2017 Scott was admitted to hospital for a seizure he experienced four miles into a regular training run. He reportedly had experienced seizures in the past. In spite of the hospitalisation, doctors did not forbid him from racing, and he went on to win the men's 10,000 metres at the 2017 NCAA DI Outdoor Championships in a time of 29:01.54, running the last 400 metres in 55.44 seconds.

After graduating from Tulsa, Scott joined the Bowerman Track Club. He raced the men's 5000 metres at the 2018 European Championships, placing fifth in the final.

In 2019, he won the Great South Run road 10 miles.

Scott became a double British champion when winning the 5000 metres event at the 2020 British Athletics Championships in a time of 13 min 32.98 sec. He had previously took the title in 2018.

In 2021, he claimed victories at the Great North Run half marathon and the Great Manchester Run road 10K.

Scott's bronze medal in the 3000 metres at the 2022 World Indoor Championships in Belgrade was only the second time in the meet history that a British male has medalled over the distance.

In September 2024, he won the UK Athletics 5K Road Running Championship and finished second behind Abel Kipchumba in the Great North Run.

In October 2025 he won the Men’s Elite 10 Mile Great South Run coming 1st place with a time of 47:21.

== Achievements ==
Information taken from World Athletics profile.

=== International competitions ===
Representing Great Britain / England
Year	Competition	Venue	Position	Event	Result
2014	European Cross Country Championships	Samokov, Bulgaria	7th	XC 8.05 km U23	25:54
2014	European Cross Country Championships	Samokov, Bulgaria	2nd	Team U23	31 pts
2015	European U23 Championships	Tallinn, Estonia	6th	10,000 m	29:21.99
2015	European Cross Country Championships	Hyères, France	4th	XC 8.087 km U23	23:39
2015	European Cross Country Championships	Hyères, France	2nd	Team U23	41 pts
2017	World Championships	London, United Kingdom	33rd (h)	5000 m	13:58.11
2018	European Championships	Berlin, Germany	5th	5000 m	13:23.14
2018	European Cross Country Championships	Tilburg, Netherlands	9th	XC 10.3 km	29:21
2018	European Cross Country Championships	Tilburg, Netherlands	2nd	Team	34 pts
2019	World Championships	Doha, Qatar	29th (h)	5000 m	13:47.12
2021	European 10,000m Cup	Birmingham, United Kingdom	7th	10,000 m	27:49.94
2021	Olympic Games	Tokyo, Japan	17th (h)	5000 m	13:39.61
2021	Olympic Games	Tokyo, Japan	14th	10,000 m	28:09.23
2022	World Indoor Championships	Belgrade, Serbia	3rd	3000 m	7:42.02
2022	World Championships	Eugene, OR, United States	14th	5000 m	13:41.04
2022	Commonwealth Games	Birmingham, United Kingdom	4th	5000 m	13:19.64 SB
2022	European Championships	Munich, Germany	12th	10,000 m	28:07.72

=== National and NCAA titles ===
- British Athletics Championships
  - 5000 metres: 2018, 2020, 2022
- British Indoor Athletics Championships
  - 3000 metres: 2022
- NCAA Division I Outdoor Track and Field Championships
  - 10,000 metres: 2017

=== Personal bests ===
- 1500 metres – 3:35.93 (Portland 2020)
- One mile indoors – 4:05.36 (Iowa City 2017)
- 3000 metres – 7:36.08 (Phoenix 2021)
  - 3000 metres indoors – 7:46.11 (Seattle 2020)
- 5000 metres – 13:05.13 (San Juan Capistrano 2021)
  - 5000 metres indoors – 12:57.08 (Boston 2022) European record
- 10,000 metres – 27:10.41 (San Juan Capistrano 2021)

Road

- 5 kilometres – 13:20 (Barrowford 2020)
- 10 kilometres – 28:03 (Manchester 2021)
- 10 miles – 46:58 (Portsmouth 2019)
- Half Marathon – 60:39 (Larne 2020)
- Relivo Champion of Mafeking Scouts
