= 2014 European Cross Country Championships =

- Organisers: EAA
- Edition: 21st
- Date: 14 December
- Host city: Samokov, Bulgaria
- Venue: Borovets
- Events: 6
- Distances: 9.880 km – Men; 8.050 km – Women; 8.050 km – U23 men 6.025 km – U23 women 6.025 km – Junior men 4.000 km – Junior women
- Official website: http://www.samokov2014.eu/

The 2014 European Cross Country Championships was the 21st edition of the cross country running competition for European athletes which was held in Samokov, Bulgaria, on 14 December 2014. The events were hosted at Borovets – a winter sports and ski resort in the Rila mountains.

== Race results ==
=== Senior men ===
Individual race
Rank	Athlete	Country	Time (m:s)
Gold medal	Polat Kemboi Arikan	Turkey	32:19
Silver medal	Ali Kaya	Turkey	32:19
Bronze medal	Alemayehu Bezabeh	Spain	32:30
4	Florian Carvalho	France	32:59
5	Ross Millington	Great Britain	33:00
6	Mohamed Marhum	Spain	33:04
7	Khalid Choukoud	Netherlands	33:04
8	Stefano La Rosa	Italy	33:17
9	Adam Hickey	Great Britain	33:19
10	Timothée Bommier	France	33:21

Teams
Rank	Team	Points
Gold medal	Turkey; Arikan; Kaya; Cihat Ulus; Ramazan Özdemir	33
Silver medal	Spain; Bezabeh; Marhum; Antonio Abadía; Roberto Alaiz	36
Bronze medal	Italy; Stefano La Rosa; Marouan Razine; Patrick Nasti; Ahmed El Mazoury	59

- Totals: 75 entrants, 75 starters, 70 finishers, 9 finishing teams.

=== Senior women ===
Individual race
Rank	Athlete	Country	Time (m:s)
Gold medal	Gemma Steel	Great Britain	28:27
Silver medal	Kate Avery	Great Britain	28:27
Bronze medal	Meraf Bahta	Sweden	28:52
4	Almensch Belete	Belgium	28:52
5	Sophie Duarte	France	28:58
6	Fionnuala Britton	Ireland	28:59
7	Steph Twell	Great Britain	29:07
8	Iwona Lewandowska	Poland	29:09
9	Iris María Fuentes-Pila	Spain	29:19
10	Carla Salomé Rocha	Portugal	29:20

Teams
Rank	Team	Points
Gold medal	Great Britain; Steel; Avery; Twell; Lily Partridge	21
Silver medal	Spain; Fuentes-Pila; Trihas Gebre; Diana Martín; Lidia Rodríguez	70
Bronze medal	Ireland; Britton; Sara Treacy; Michelle Finn; Annmarie McGlynn	87

- Totals: 62 entrants, 62 starters, 58 finishers, 7 finishing teams.

=== Under-23 men ===
Individual race
Rank	Athlete	Country	Time (m:s)
Gold medal	Ilgizar Safiulin	Russia	25:31
Silver medal	Igor Maksimov	Russia	25:33
Bronze medal	Vladimir Nikitin	Russia	25:37
4	Jonathan Hay	Great Britain	25:46
5	Callum Hawkins	Great Britain	25:49
6	Elmar Engholm	Sweden	25:52
7	Marc Scott	Great Britain	25:54
8	Francois Barrer	France	25:56
9	Alexander Palm	Sweden	26:00
10	Mikhail Strelkov	Russia	26:03

Teams
Rank	Team	Points
Gold medal	Russia; Safiulin; Maksimov; Nikitin; Strelkov	16
Silver medal	Great Britain; Hay; Hawkins; Scott; Charlie Hulson	31
Bronze medal	Sweden; Engholm; Palm; Napoleon Solomon; John Kingstedt	62

- Totals: 75 entrants, 74 starters, 66 finishers, 10 finishing teams.

=== Under-23 women ===
Individual race
Rank	Athlete	Country	Time (m:s)
Gold medal	Rhona Auckland	Great Britain	22:23
Silver medal	Militsa Mircheva	Bulgaria	22:25
Bronze medal	Gulshat Fazlitdinova	Russia	22:28
4	Yekaterina Sokolenko	Russia	22:32
5	Maureen Koster	Netherlands	22:37
6	Sevilay Eytemis	Turkey	22:44
7	Louise Carton	Belgium	22:49
8	Svetlana Aplachkina	Russia	22:56
9	Alice Wright	Great Britain	22:59
10	Amela Terzić	Serbia	23:04

Teams
Rank	Team	Points
Gold medal	Russia; Fazlitdinova; Sokolenko; Aplachkina; Luiza Litvinova	–
Silver medal	Great Britain; Auckland; Wright; Emelia Gorecka; Maryse Haines	–
Bronze medal	Turkey; Eytemis; Seyran Adanir; Sabahat Akpinar; Esma Aydemir	–

- Totals: 60 entrants, 60 starters, 59 finishers, 9 finishing teams.

=== Junior men ===
Individual race
Rank	Athlete	Country	Time (m:s)
Gold medal	Yemaneberhan Crippa	Italy	20:07
Silver medal	Carlos Mayo	Spain	20:22
Bronze medal	Said Ettaqy	Italy	20:28
4	Ayoub Mokhtar	Spain	20:30
5	Yohanes Chiappinelli	Italy	20:33
6	Emmanuel Roudolff Levisse	France	20:37
7	Jordi Torrents	Spain	20:40
8	William Levay	Sweden	20:40
9	Alessandro Giacobazzi	Italy	20:41
10	Emil Danielsson	Sweden	20:42

Teams
Rank	Team	Points
Gold medal	Italy; Yemaneberhan Crippa; Said Ettaqy; Yohanes Chiappinelli; Alessandro Giacobazzi	18
Silver medal	Spain; Mayo; Mokhtar; Torrents; Raul Celada	41
Bronze medal	Turkey; Saffet Elkatmis; Ferhat Bozkurt; Suleyman Bekmezci; Ramazan Barbaros	70

- Totals: 105 entrants, 104 starters, 94 finishers, 17 finishing teams.

=== Junior women ===
Individual race
Rank	Athlete	Country	Time (m:s)
Gold medal	Emine Hatun Tuna	Turkey	14:13
Silver medal	Jessica Judd	Great Britain	14:18
Bronze medal	Lydia Turner	Great Britain	14:25
4	Alina Reh	Germany	14:34
5	Amy Griffiths	Great Britain	14:38
6	Anna Emilie Møller	Denmark	14:42
7	Cassandre Beaugrand	France	14:44
8	Rebecca Straw	Great Britain	14:48
9	Célia Antón	Spain	14:49
10	Weronika Pyzik	Poland	14:55

Teams
Rank	Team	Points
Gold medal	Great Britain; Judd; Turner; Griffiths; Straw	18
Silver medal	France; Beaugrand; Célia Bremond; Charlotte Mouchet; Cecile Lejeune	64
Bronze medal	Germany; Reh; Sarah Kistner; Anna Gehring; Konstanze Klosterhalfen	74

- Totals: 76 entrants, 76 starters, 74 finishers, 10 finishing teams.

== Medal table ==
Rank	Nation	Gold	Silver	Bronze	Total
1	Great Britain (GBR)	4	4	1	9
2	Russia (RUS)	3	1	2	6
2	Turkey (TUR)	3	1	2	6
4	Italy (ITA)	2	0	2	4
5	Spain (ESP)	0	4	1	5
6	Bulgaria (BUL)	0	1	0	1
6	France (FRA)	0	1	0	1
8	Sweden (SWE)	0	0	2	2
9	Germany (GER)	0	0	1	1
9	Ireland (IRL)	0	0	1	1
Totals (10 entries)		12	12	12	36
