= Adel Mechaal =

Spanish athlete (born 1990)

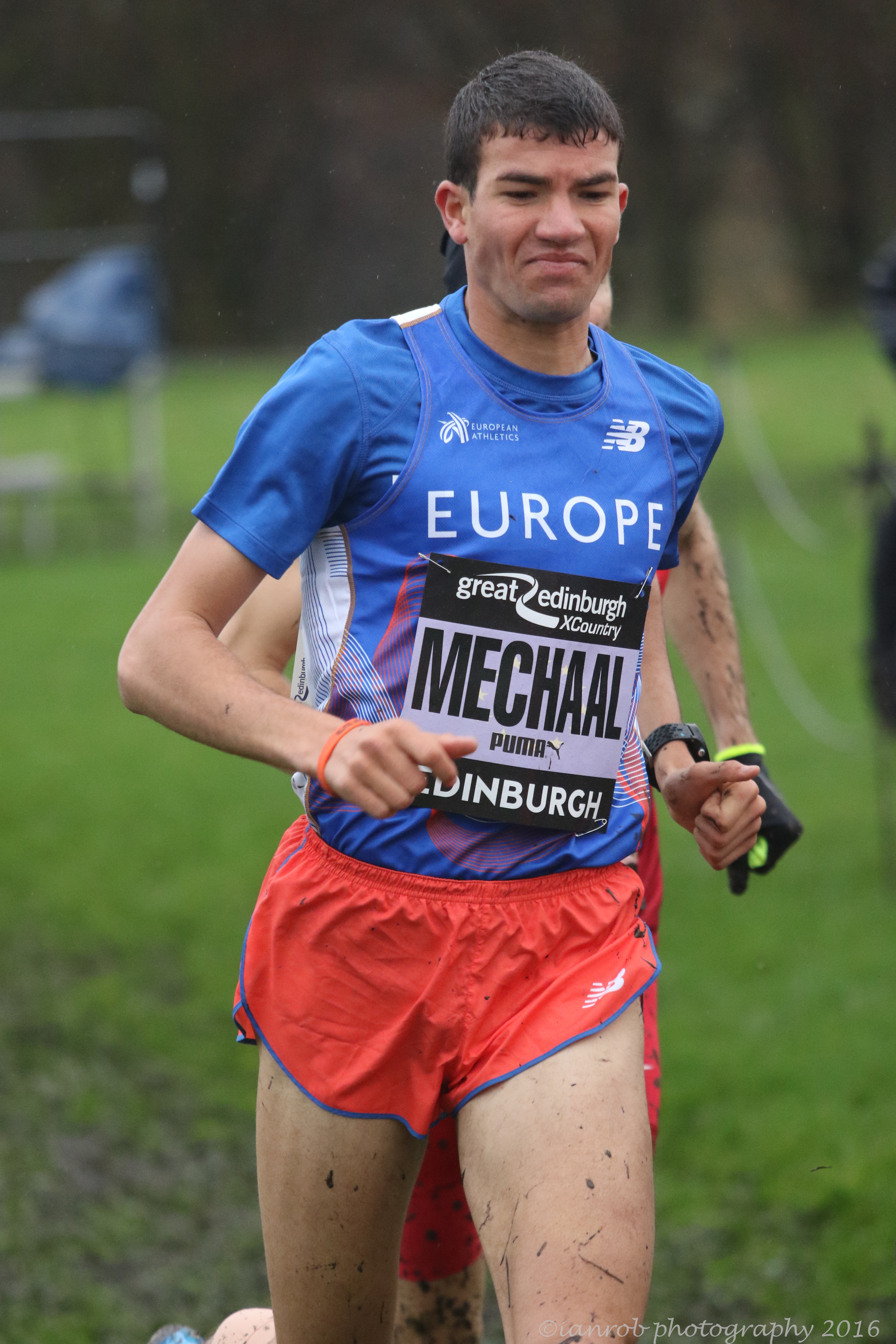
- Mechaal in 2016

Personal information
- Full name: Adel Mechaal Mechaal
- Nationality: Spanish
- Born: 5 December 1990 (age 35) El Jebha, Morocco

Sport
- Country: Spain
- Sport: Athletics
- Events: Middle, Long-distance running
- Club: New Balance Team
- Coached by: Antonio Serrano
Medal record
Men's athletics
Representing Spain
European Championships
Silver medal – second place	2016 Amsterdam	5000 m
European Indoor Championships
Gold medal – first place	2017 Belgrade	3000 m
Silver medal – second place	2023 Istanbul	3000 m
Bronze medal – third place	2021 Toruń	3000 m
European Cross Country Championships
Gold medal – first place	2024 Antalya	Team race
Gold medal – first place	2015 Hyères	Team race
Silver medal – second place	2017 Šamorín	Senior race
Silver medal – second place	2016 Chia	Team race
Silver medal – second place	2017 Šamorín	Team race
Bronze medal – third place	2015 Hyères	Senior race

Adel Mechaal Mechaal (born 5 December 1990) is a middle- and long-distance runner. Born in Morocco, he represents Spain internationally. In the 1500 metres, he placed fourth at the 2017 World Championships, and fifth at the 2020 Tokyo Olympics. Over the 5000 metres, Mechaal won the silver medal at the 2016 European Championships. He is a three-time European Indoor Championships 3000 metres medallist. He also won two medals for the men's senior races at the European Cross Country Championships.

Mechaal is the Spanish indoor record holder for the 1500 m. He won multiple national outdoor and indoor titles between 2015 and 2023 (1500 m, 3000 m and 5000 m).

Mechaal held the European indoor 3000 m record set in February 2022 with a time of 7:30.82 at the New Balance Indoor Grand Prix in New York.

== Statistics ==
=== Personal bests ===
- 800 metres – 1:47.69 (Barcelona 2019)
- 1500 metres – 3:30.77 (Tokyo 2021)
  - 1500 metres indoor – 3:33.28 (Birmingham 2023) NR
- 3000 metres – 7:35.28 (Paris 2017)
  - 3000 metres indoor – 7:30.82 (New York 2022)
- 5000 metres – 13:06.02 (Oslo 2022)
- 10,000 metres – 27:50.56 (London 2018)

Road

- 10 kilometres – 27:46 (Manchester 2024)
- Half marathon – 1:02:30 (Gdynia 2020)

=== International competitions ===
Representing Spain
Year	Competition	Venue	Position	Event	Time
2014	World Indoor Championships	Sopot, Poland	11th	1500 m i	3:41.27
2014	World Relays	Nassau, Bahamas	4th	4 × 1500 m relay	15:00.69
2014	European Championships	Zürich, Switzerland	25th	1500 m	3:47.60
2015	European Indoor Championships	Prague, Czech Republic	6th	3000 m i	7:49.59
2015	World Cross Country Championships	Guiyang, China	68th	Senior race	38:57
2015	World Championships	Beijing, China	37th	1500 m	3:46.05
2015	European Cross Country Championships	Hyères, France	3rd	Senior race	29:51
2015	European Cross Country Championships	Hyères, France	1st	Senior team	14 pts
2016	European Championships	Amsterdam, Netherlands	2nd	5000 m	13:40.85
2016	Olympic Games	Rio de Janeiro, Brazil	33rd (h)	1500 m	3:48.41
2016	Olympic Games	Rio de Janeiro, Brazil	30th (h)	5000 m	13:34.42
2016	European Cross Country Championships	Chia, Italy	8th	Senior race	28:26
2016	European Cross Country Championships	Chia, Italy	2nd	Senior team	32 pts
2017	European Indoor Championships	Belgrade, Serbia	1st	3000 m i	8:00.60
2017	World Cross Country Championships	Kampala, Uganda	43rd	Senior race	30:40
2017	World Championships	London, United Kingdom	4th	1500m	3:34.71
2017	European Cross Country Championships	Šamorín, Slovakia	2nd	Senior race	29:54
2017	European Cross Country Championships	Šamorín, Slovakia	2nd	Senior team	20 pts
2018	World Indoor Championships	Birmingham, United Kingdom	5th	3000 m i	8:16.13
2018	European 10,000m Cup	London, United Kingdom	4th	10,000 m	27:50.56
2018	European Championships	Berlin, Germany	–	5000 m	DNF
2018	European Championships	Berlin, Germany	4th	10,000 m	28:13.78
2018	European Cross Country Championships	Tilburg, Netherlands	8th	Senior race	29:20
2019	World Championships	Doha, Qatar	25th (h)	1500 m	3:37.95
2020	World Half Marathon Championships	Gdynia, Poland	46th	Half marathon	1:02:30
2021	European Indoor Championships	Toruń, Poland	3rd	3000 m i	7:49.47
2021	Olympic Games	Tokyo, Japan	5th	1500 m	3:30.77
2022	World Indoor Championships	Belgrade, Serbia	7th	3000 m i	7:43.60
2022	World Championships	Eugene, OR, United States	22nd (h)	5000 m	13:36.48
2022	European Championships	Munich, Germany	14th	5000 m	13:35.92
2023	European Indoor Championships	Istanbul, Turkey	2nd	3000 m i	7:41.75 SB
2023	World Championships	Budapest, Hungary	9th (sf)	1500 m	3:33.33
2024	World Indoor Championships	Glasgow, United Kingdom	6th	1500 m i	3:37.76
2024	World Indoor Championships	Glasgow, United Kingdom	6th	3000 m i	7:45.67
2024	European Championships	Rome, Italy	5th	1500 m	3:33.58
2024	European Championships	Rome, Italy	4th	5000 m	13:22.77
2024	Olympic Games	Paris, France	27th (rep)	1500 m	3:42.79

=== National titles ===
- Spanish Athletics Championships
  - 1500 metres: 2015, 2017, 2021
  - 5000 metres: 2015, 2017
- Spanish Indoor Athletics Championships
  - 1500 metres: 2015, 2018, 2022
  - 3000 metres: 2015, 2017, 2018, 2020, 2021, 2022, 2023
