= Said Ettaqy =

Italian long-distance runner

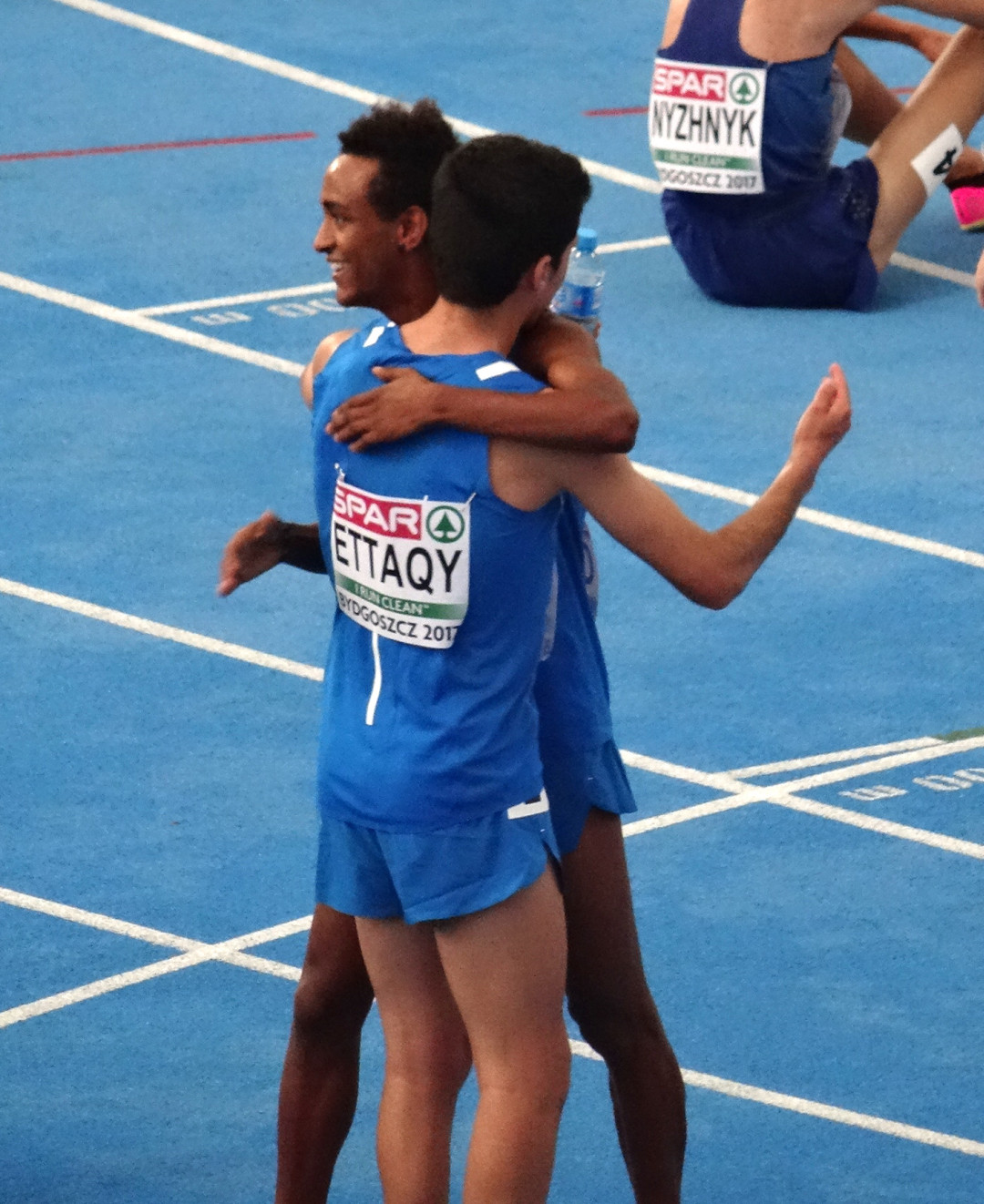
- Ettaqui, from behind, celebrates the victory of teammate Crippa in the 5000 m at the 2017 European U-23 Championships.

Personal information
- National team: Italy
- Born: 16 September 1996 (age 29) Krakra, Morocco
- Height: 1.73 m (5 ft 8 in)
- Weight: 60 kg (132 lb)

Sport
- Sport: Athletics
- Event(s): Long-distance running Cross-country running
- Club: C.S. Esercito
- Coached by: Martina Celi

Achievements and titles
- Personal bests: 5000 m: 14:05.42 (2017); 10 km: 30:55 (2015)
Medal record
Event	1st	2nd	3rd
European Cross Country C'ships	2	1	1

Said Ettaqy (born 16 September 1996) is an Italian male long-distance runner and cross-country runner who won four medals ath the European Cross Country Championships at youth level.

== Achievements ==
Year	Competition	Venue	Rank	Event	Time	Notes
2014	EuropeanCross Country Championships	(Bulgaria) Samokov	3rd	Junior individual	20:28	
2014	EuropeanCross Country Championships	(Bulgaria) Samokov	1st	Junior team	18 pts	
2015	EuropeanCross Country Championships	(France) Hyères	5th	Junior individual	17:49	
2015	EuropeanCross Country Championships	(France) Hyères	2nd	Junior team	18 pts	
2016	EuropeanCross Country Championships	(Italy) Chia	11th	U-23 individual	23:16	
2016	EuropeanCross Country Championships	(Italy) Chia	1st	U-23 team	35 pts	

== See also ==
- Italy at the European Cross Country Championships
