= Stephanie Twell =

British runner (born 1989)

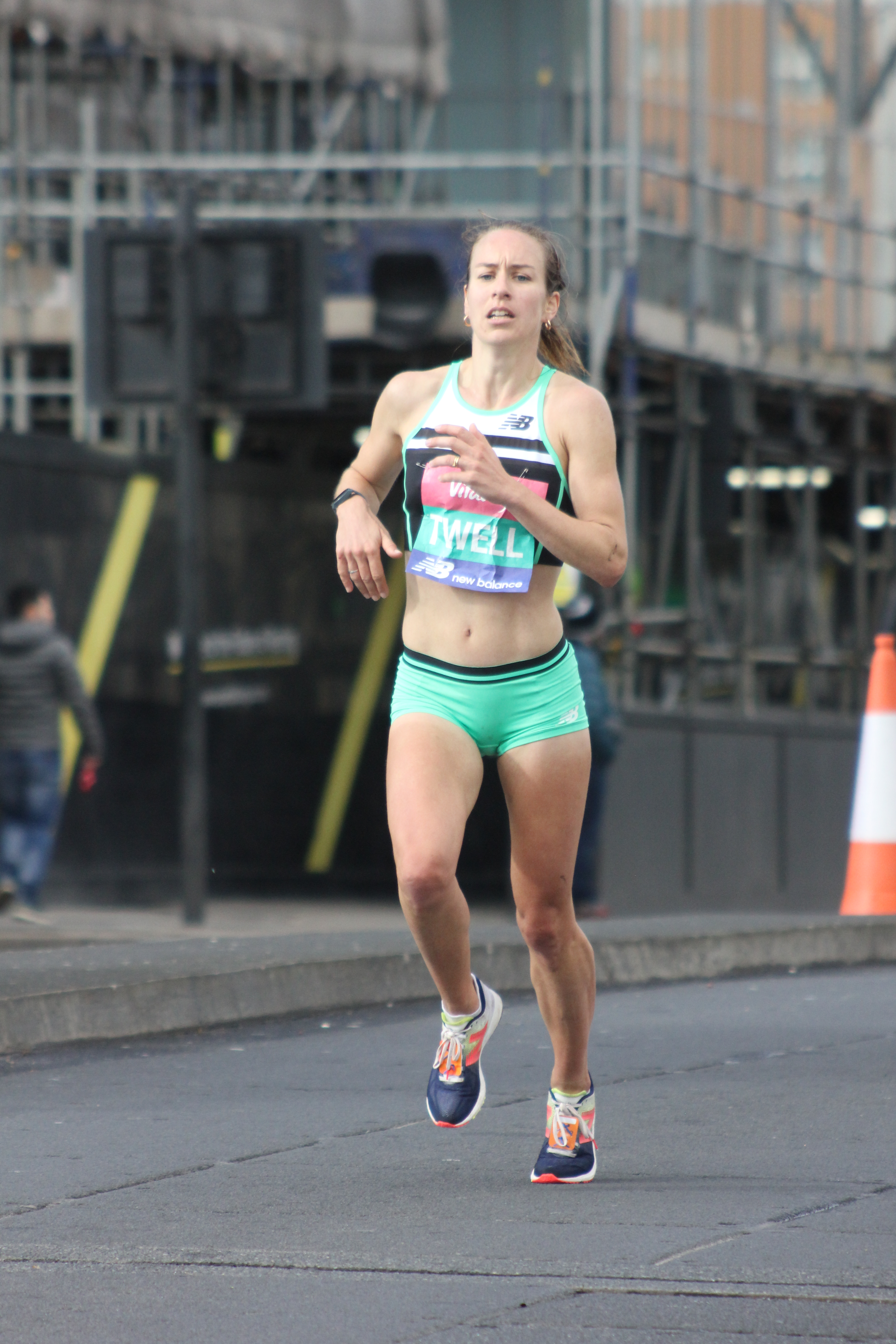
- Twell, running to an impressive second place in 2019 London Half Marathon

Personal information
- Born: 17 August 1989 (age 36) Colchester, Essex, UK
- Height: 1.69 m (5 ft 6 1/2 in)
- Weight: 53.5 kg (118 lb; 8.42 st)

Sport
- Country: Great Britain; Scotland
- Club: Aldershot, Farnham & District AC
- Coached by: Mick Woods 1998-2017

Achievements and titles
- Olympic finals: 2008, 1500 m, 6th in heat
- Personal best: 400m: 57.7 800m: 2:02.58 1500m: 4:02.54 3000m: 8:40.98 5000m: 14:54.08
Medal record
Event	1st	2nd	3rd
Commonwealth Games	0	0	1
European Championships	0	0	1
Euro Cross Country Championships	3	1	1
Euro Cross Country Champions Club Cup	0	0	2
World Juniors	1	0	0
European Juniors	0	1	0
Euro Cross Country U23 / Juniors	7	0	0
Total	11	2	5
Women's track and field
European Championships
Bronze medal – third place	2016 Amsterdam	5000 m
Commonwealth Games
Bronze medal – third place	2010 Delhi	1500 m
World Junior Championships
Gold medal – first place	2008 Bydgoszcz	1500 m
European Junior Championships
Silver medal – second place	2007 Hengelo	1500 m
Women's cross country
European Cross Country Championships
Gold medal – first place	2013 Belgrade	Senior team
Gold medal – first place	2014 Samatov	Senior team
Gold medal – first place	2015 Hyrès	Senior team
Gold medal – first place	2006 San Giorgio	Junior individual
Gold medal – first place	2006 San Giorgio	Junior team
Gold medal – first place	2007 Toro	Junior individual
Gold medal – first place	2007 Toro	Junior team
Gold medal – first place	2008 Brussels	Junior individual
Gold medal – first place	2008 Brussels	Junior team
Gold medal – first place	2009 Dublin	U23 team
Silver medal – second place	2016 Chia	Senior team
Bronze medal – third place	2010 Albufeira	Senior team
European Champion Clubs Cross Country
Silver medal – second place	2014 Albufeira	Senior team
Bronze medal – third place	2015 Guadalajara	Senior team
Bronze medal – third place	2017 Albufeira	Senior team
- Updated on 11 December 2016

Stephanie April Twell (born 17 August 1989) is a British middle- and long-distance runner who competed at the 2008 Olympics in Beijing, the 2016 Olympics in Rio de Janeiro and the 2020 Summer Olympics in Tokyo. She trains at Aldershot, Farnham & District AC. She won the 1500 metres at the 2008 World Junior Championships, and is a three-time winner of the European Junior Cross Country Championships (2006–2008), as well as being part of four winning Great Britain teams. Representing Scotland, she won a bronze medal in the 1500 metres at the 2010 Commonwealth Games in Delhi.

Twell is currently sponsored by sports company Hoka One One and was previously sponsored by New Balance. She was coached by one of the nation's leading endurance coaches, Mick Woods, for 19 years, from 1998 to 2017. She is now self-coached.

== Personal life ==
Twell was born in Colchester, England. Twell announced in 2009 that she would compete for Scotland rather than England, and represented Scotland at the 2010 and 2014 Commonwealth Games, despite running for Hampshire in the London Mini Marathon 2007 over Scotland. She is eligible to compete for Scotland as her mother is from Paisley. She married fellow runner Joe Morwood in the autumn of 2018. In May 2019, the couple broke the world record for the fastest 1 mile while holding hands.

== Career ==
Twell's personal best time for the 1500 metres is 4:02.70, set in Barcelona, Spain on 1 August 2010. She competed in the women's 1500 metres at the 2008 Beijing Olympics and was eliminated in her heats running 4:06.68.

In September 2008, Twell was named European Athletics Rising Star of 2008. In January 2009 she was named "Telegraph Ten for 2012" – 10 of Britain's brightest young sports stars in The Daily Telegraph.

She began the 2009 cross country season well, winning at the Antrim International Cross Country. A few months later, Twell finished 38th in the 2009 World Cross Country Championships in Jordan. Although she was the fastest Briton in the race, she was disappointed with her performance and stated that she resolved to do better in the next championships.

She set a new personal best in the 5000 metres in May 2009, winning the Artur Takac Memorial in 15:18.47 – a meeting record.

She had a disappointing run at the 2009 European Team Championships over 3000 m, finishing in fourth in a time well outside her PB. At the 2009 World Championships she was never in contention in her heat at 1500 m and then when one of the favourites she was only 11th in the European Cross Country Championships (under 23 race).

Her 2010 was marked by improvements in her personal bests on the track. She set a 1500 metres best at the Weltklasse Zurich Diamond League meeting, finishing third and ahead of Lisa Dobriskey with a time of 4:02.54. Stepping up to the 5000 m at the Memorial van Damme in Brussels, she smashed her previous best by 22 seconds to set a new Scottish record of 14.54.08, breaking Yvonne Murray's 15-year-old mark. She ran at the Women's 5K Challenge in London in August 2010 and took third place behind Sylvia Kibet and Linet Masai. Reflecting on the race, she said: "To run 15:32 is great for me and third was just what I aimed for." Twell suffered a fractured ankle competing in a cross-country race in Belgium in February 2011. A further foot injury in June 2012 ended her hopes of competing at the 2012 Summer Olympics.

Twell won the London 10,000 in 2018 and 2019.

== Competition record ==
Year	Competition	Venue	Position	Event	Notes
Representing Great Britain / Scotland
2005	European Youth Olympic Festival	Lignano, Italy	5th	1500 m	4:29.91
2006	World Junior Championships	Beijing, China	8th	1500 m	4:16.58
2006	European Junior Cross Country Championships	San Giorgio su Legnano, Italy	1st	4.1 km	12:33
2007	European Junior Cross Country Championships	Toro, Spain	1st	4.2 km	14:12
2007	European Junior Championships	Hengelo, Netherlands	2nd	1500 m	4:16.03
2008	World Junior Championships	Bydgoszcz, Poland	1st	1500 m	4:15.09
2008	World Athletics Final	Stuttgart, Germany	7th	3000 m	8:50.89
2008	Olympic Games	Beijing, China	6th (h)	1500 m	4:06.68
2008	European Junior Cross Country Championships	Brussels, Belgium	1st	4.2 km	13:28
2009	World Cross Country Championships	Amman, Jordan	38th	8 km	28:46
2009	European Cross Country Championships	Fingal, Ireland	11th		21:42
2009	European Team Championships Super League	Leiria, Portugal	4th	3000 m	9:09.65
2010	European Championships	Barcelona, Spain	7th	1500 m	4:02.70
2010	Commonwealth Games	Delhi, India	3rd	1500 m	4:06.19
2010	Commonwealth Games	Delhi, India	4th	5000 m	16:03.91
2010	World Cross Country Championships	Bydgoszcz, Poland	23rd	7.8 km	26:11
2013	World Cross Country Championships	Bydgoszcz, Poland	40th	8 km	25:58
2014	European Champion Clubs Cup Cross Country	Albufeira, Portugal	7th	Individ.	
2014	Commonwealth Games	Glasgow, Scotland	14th	5000 m	16:30.66
2015	European Champion Clubs Cup Cross Country	Guadalajara, Spain	4th	Individ.	21:12
2015	World Championships	Beijing, China	12th	5000 m	15:26.24
2016	World Indoor Championships	Portland, Oregon	6th	3000 m	09:00.38
2016	European Championships	Amsterdam, Netherlands	3rd	5000 m	15:20.70
2016	Olympic Games	Rio de Janeiro, Brazil	heats	5000 m	15:25.90
2017	European Champion Clubs Cup Cross Country	Albufeira, Portugal	4th	Individ.	21:52
2017	European Indoor Championships	Belgrade, Serbia	5th	3000 m	08:50.40
2017	World Championships	London, United Kingdom	heats	5000 m	15:41.29
2018	Commonwealth Games	Gold Coast, Australia	7th	1500 m	4:05.56
2018	Commonwealth Games	Gold Coast, Australia	14th	5000 m	16:05.65
2018	European Championships	Berlin, Germany	10th	5000 m	15:41.10
2019	World Championships	Doha, Qatar	15th	10,000 m	31:44.79
2019	European 10,000m Cup	London, England	1st	10,000 m	31:08.13
2021	Olympic Games	Sapporo, Japan	68th	Marathon	2:53:26
2022	European Champion Clubs Cup Cross Country	Oeiras, Portugal	9th	Individ.	23:07

=== Circuit wins ===
- IAAF Cross Country Permit Meetings
  - Belfast International (2009)

=== National titles ===
- British Championships
  - 5000 m: 2013, 2015, 2016, 2017, 2018
  - 10,000 m: 2019
- British Indoor Championships
  - 3000 m: 2016
- BUCS Championships:
  - 5000 m: 2009
  - Cross Country: 2010

== Circuit wins ==
Year	Competition	Venue	Position	Event	Notes
2019	Reading Half Marathon	Reading, United Kingdom	1st	Half marathon	1:11:37

== Personal bests ==
Event	Time	Venue	Date
400 metres	57.7	Aldershot, England	18 June 2016
800 metres	2:02.58	Watford, England	15 June 2016
1500 metres	4:02.54	Zurich, Switzerland	19 August 2010
One mile	4:25.39	London, England	9 July 2017
3000 metres	8:40.98	Monaco, Monaco	15 July 2016
5000 metres	14:54.08	Brussels, Belgium	27 August 2010
10,000 metres	31:08.13	Parliament Hill, England	6 July 2019
Half marathon	1:08:55	Houston, USA	19 January 2020
Marathon	2:26:40	Frankfurt, Germany	27 October 2019

- All information (excluding 400m) taken from IAAF profile.
