= Karoline Bjerkeli Grøvdal =

Norwegian long-distance runner

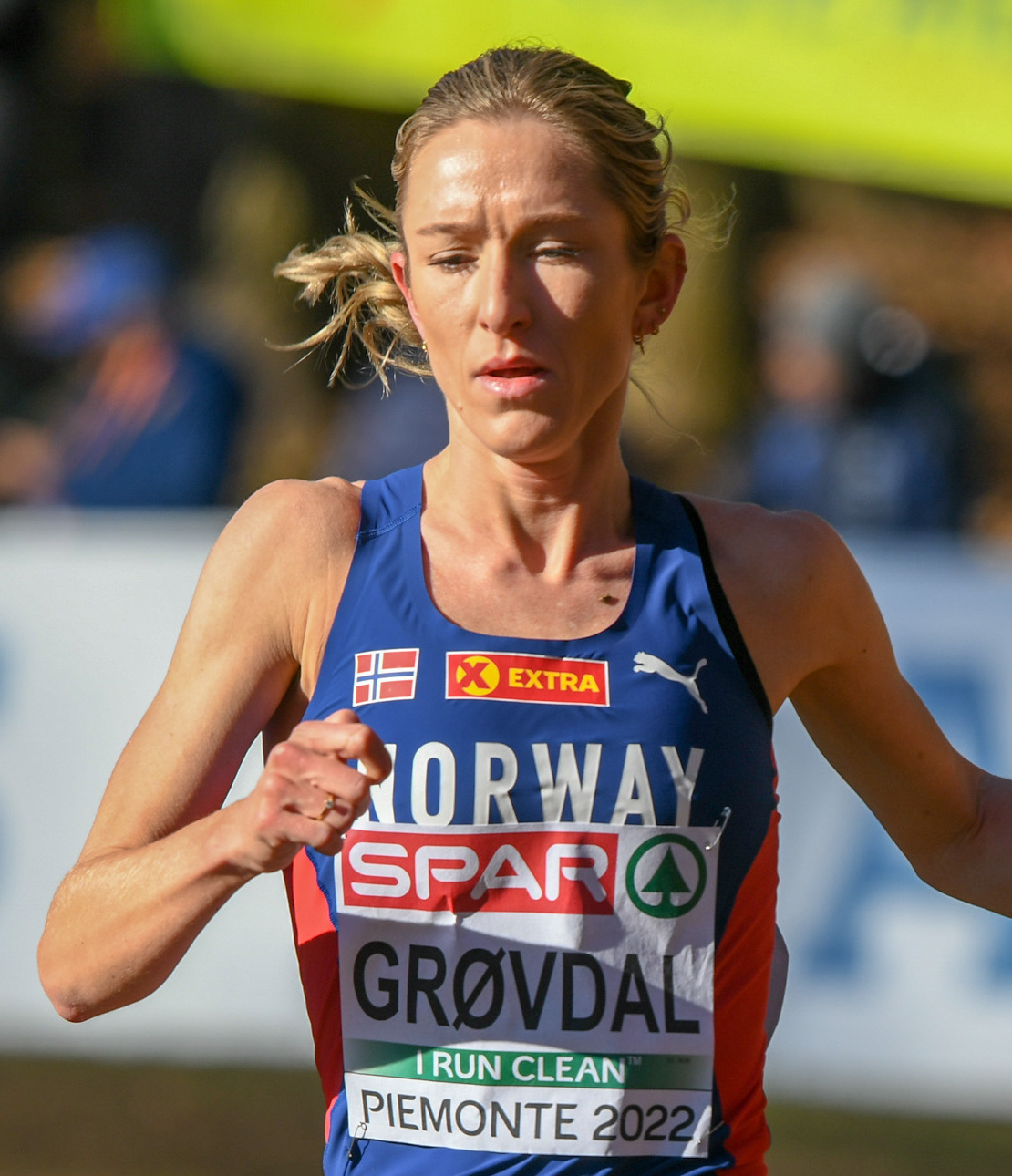
- Grøvdal at the 2022 European Cross Country Championships in Turin

Personal information
- Born: 14 June 1990 (age 36) Ålesund, Norway
- Height: 1.67 m (5 ft 6 in)
- Weight: 52 kg (115 lb)

Sport
- Country: Norway
- Sport: Athletics
- Events: Middle-, Long-distance running; 3000 m steeplechase
- Club: IK Tjalve
Medal record
Women's athletics
Representing Norway
European Championships
Gold medal – first place	2024 Rome	Half marathon
Silver medal – second place	2024 Rome	5000 m
Bronze medal – third place	2016 Amsterdam	10,000 m
Bronze medal – third place	2018 Berlin	3000 m s'chase
European Junior Championships
Gold medal – first place	2007 Hengelo	3000 m s'chase
Gold medal – first place	2009 Novi Sad	5000 m
Gold medal – first place	2009 Novi Sad	3000 m s'chase
World Youth Championships
Bronze medal – third place	2007 Ostrava	2000 m s'chase
European Cross Country Championships
Gold medal – first place	2009 Dublin	Junior race
Gold medal – first place	2021 Dublin	Senior race
Gold medal – first place	2022 Turin	Senior race
Gold medal – first place	2023 Brussels	Senior race
Silver medal – second place	2006 San Giorgio su Legnano	Junior race
Silver medal – second place	2019 Lisbon	Senior race
Bronze medal – third place	2015 Hyères	Senior race
Bronze medal – third place	2016 Chia	Senior race
Bronze medal – third place	2017 Šamorín	Senior race
Bronze medal – third place	2018 Tilburg	Senior race

Karoline Bjerkeli Grøvdal (born 14 June 1990) is a Norwegian middle-, long-distance and steeplechase runner. She is a European Championships gold medallist in half marathon, silver medallist in 5000 metres and bronze medallist in 10,000 metres and 3000 metres steeplechase. Grøvdal is a four-time Olympian and represented Norway at the 2012, 2016, 2020 and 2024 Olympic Games.

Grøvdal won the gold medal in the half marathon and the silver medal in the 5000 metres at the 2024 European Championships, and the bronze medal in the 10,000 metres at the 2016 European Championships and the 3000 metres steeplechase at the 2018 European Championships. She has earned ten individual medals, including four golds, at the European Cross Country Championships, an unsurpassed record by a female athlete in the meet history.

Grøvdal won the bronze medal in the 2000 m steeplechase at the 2007 World Youth Championships and the gold medal in the 3000 m steeplechase at the 2007 European Junior Championships. At the 2009 European Junior Championships, she won gold medals in the 5000 m and 3000 m steeplechase. She holds four Norwegian records (One mile, indoor 3000 m, 5000 m, 3000 m steeplechase) plus two bests (2000 m, 2000 m steeplechase). She has won 18 individual senior national titles.

== Personal life ==
Grøvdal is married to Magnus Krogsæter Aarre. She gave birth to a daughter in May 2026.

== Career ==
Karoline Grøvdal gained her first international experience as a 16-year-old in June 2006, winning 3000 m steeplechase race at the European Cup Second League held in Banská Bystrica, Slovakia. In August that year, she placed fifth in the event at the World Under-20 Championships, and in December, she capped her season with the silver medal for the U20 race at the European Cross Country Championships.

In June 2007, still 16, Grøvdal broke Norwegian senior records in the 3000 m steeplechase in Neerpelt, Belgium with a time of 9:33.19. The following month, she finished third in the 2000 m steeplechase at the World U18 Championships, and won the 3000 m steeplechase event at the European U20 Championships, breaking the European under-20 record.

In 2009, after she won three gold medals altogether at the European Junior and Cross Country Championships (U20 race), she was voted European Athletics Female Rising Star of the Year.

Injuries and illness characterized the start of Grøvdal's senior career. She started to achieve better results from 2015.

At senior level, she won the bronze medal at the 2015 European Cross Country Championships, bronze in 10,000 metres at the 2016 European Athletics Championships, bronze medals at 2016, 2017, 2018 European Cross Country Championships, bronze in the 3000 m steeplechase at the 2018 European Athletics Championships, silver at the 2019 European Cross Country Championships, and eventually a gold at the 2021 European Cross Country Championships. She defended her European cross country title in 2022. In December 2023 she won a gold medal at the 2023 European Cross Country Championships in Brussels, her third title in a row.

Grøvdal competed at the 2012 London, 2016 Rio and 2020 Tokyo Summer Olympics. She qualified for the final in 5000 metres at the 2024 Summer Olympics in Paris.

In June 2016 at the home Bislett Games in Oslo, at about two months before the Rio Summer Olympics, Grøvdal broke Grete Waitz' 38-year-old Norwegian mile record with a time of 4:26.23.

During 2021 she improved her personal bests at several distances, including 1500, 3000, 5000 and 10,000 metres. Participating in a Diamond League event in Brussels in September, she set her personal best at the 5000 metres in a time of 14:43.26. She beat that mark on the Diamond circuit at the home Bislett Games in Oslo the following year, breaking Ingrid Kristiansen’s almost 36-year-old Norwegian record by six seconds with a time of 14:31.07.

In October 2024 she won her ninth victory in the road race Hytteplanmila, which also earned her a national title.

== Statistics ==
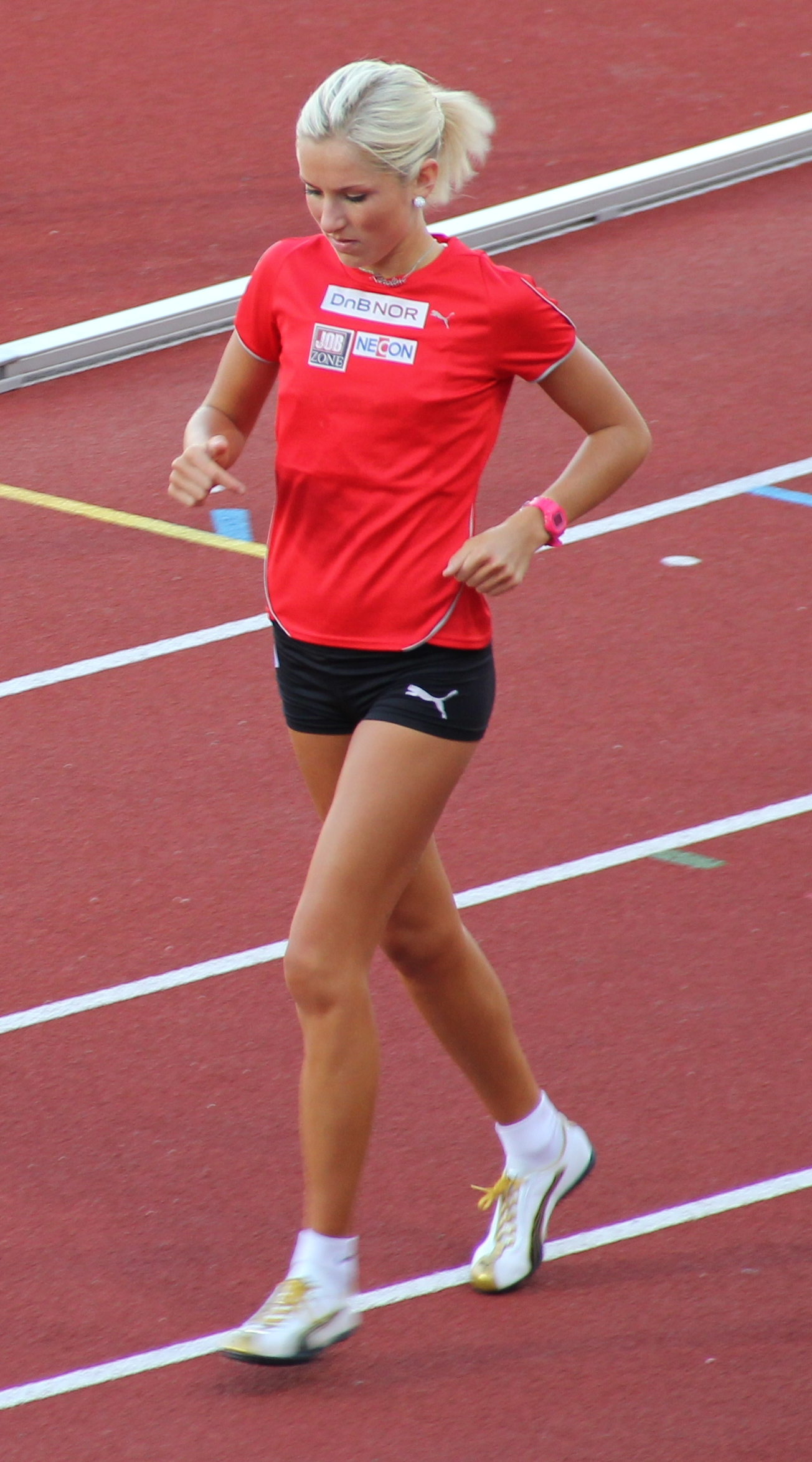
Grøvdal warms up at the 2010 Bislett Games meet in home Oslo.

=== International competitions ===
Representing Norway
Year	Competition	Venue	Position	Event	Result
2006	European Cup Second League	Banská Bystrica, Slovakia	1st	3000 m s'chase	10:17.27
2006	World Junior Championships	Beijing, China	5th	3000 m s'chase	10:00.44
2006	European Cross Country Championships	San Giorgio su Legnano, Italy	2nd	XC 4.1 km U20	12:36
2007	European Cup First League	Vaasa, Finland	2nd	5000 m	15:56.62
2007	World Youth Championships	Ostrava, Czech Republic	3rd	2000 m s'chase	6:25.30
2007	European Junior Championships	Hengelo, Netherlands	1st	3000 m s'chase	9:44.34 AU20R
2007	World Championships	Osaka, Japan	27th (h)	3000 m s'chase	9:56.41
2009	European Team Championships First League	Bergen, Norway	3rd	5000 m	15:29.82 NU20R
2009	European Team Championships First League	Bergen, Norway	3rd	3000 m s'chase	9:47.66 PB
2009	European Junior Championships	Novi Sad, Serbia	1st	5000 m	15:45.45
2009	European Junior Championships	Novi Sad, Serbia	1st	3000 m s'chase	9:43.69
2009	World Championships	Berlin, Germany	32nd (h)	3000 m s'chase	9:48.47
2009	European Cross Country Championships	Dublin, Ireland	1st	XC 4.039 km U20	14:10
2010	World Cross Country Championships	Bydgoszcz, Poland	–	Senior race	DNF
2010	European Team Championships Super League	Bergen, Norway	3rd	5000 m	15:25.40 PB
2010	European Team Championships Super League	Bergen, Norway	7th	3000 m s'chase	9:47.92
2010	European Championships	Barcelona, Spain	10th	5000 m	15:41.42
2010	European Championships	Barcelona, Spain	–	10,000 m	DNF
2011	European Team Championships First League	İzmir, Turkey	2nd	5000 m	15:44.92
2011	European Team Championships First League	İzmir, Turkey	2nd	3000 m s'chase	9:46.07
2011	European U23 Championships	Ostrava, Czech Republic	– (f)	3000 m s'chase	DNS
2012	Olympic Games	London, United Kingdom	27th (h)	5000 m	15:24.86
2013	European Team Championships Super League	Gateshead, United Kingdom	8th	5000 m	15:48.21
2013	World Championships	Moscow, Russia	13th	5000 m	15:48.87
2013	European Cross Country Championships	Belgrade, Serbia	5th	XC 8.0 km	26:52
2014	World Half Marathon Championships	Copenhagen, Denmark	20th	Half marathon	1:10:53
2014	European Championships	Zürich, Switzerland	13th	5000 m	15:52.78
2015	European Team Championships Super League	Cheboksary, Russia	2nd	1500 m	4:16.22
2015	World Championships	Beijing, China	20th (h)	5000 m	16:02.20
2015	European Cross Country Championships	Hyères, France	3rd	XC 8.087 km	25:57
2016	European Championships	Amsterdam, Netherlands	3rd	10,000 m	31:23.45
2016	Olympic Games	Rio de Janeiro, Brazil	7th	5000 m	14:57.53
2016	Olympic Games	Rio de Janeiro, Brazil	9th	10,000 m	31:14.07
2016	European Cross Country Championships	Chia, Italy	3rd	XC 7.97 km	25:26
2017	European Team Championships First League	Vaasa, Finland	7th	1500 m	4:18.24
2017	World Championships	London, United Kingdom	31st (h)	1500 m	4:09.56
2017	World Championships	London, United Kingdom	– (f)	5000 m	DNF
2017	European Cross Country Championships	Šamorín, Slovakia	3rd	XC 8.23 km	27:04
2018	European Championships	Berlin, Germany	3rd	3000 m s'chase	9:24.46
2018	European Cross Country Championships	Tilburg, Netherlands	3rd	XC 8.3 km	26:07
2019	European Indoor Championships	Glasgow, United Kingdom	5th	3000 m	8:52.12
2019	European Team Championships First League	Sandnes, Norway	8th	1500 m	4:53.78
2019	European Team Championships First League	Sandnes, Norway	1st	3000 m	9:45.20
2019	World Championships	Doha, Qatar	– (h)	5000 m	DNF
2019	World Championships	Doha, Qatar	13th	3000 m s'chase	9:29.41
2019	European Cross Country Championships	Lisbon, Portugal	2nd	XC 8.3 km	27:07
2021	Olympic Games	Tokyo, Japan	14th	5000 m	15:09.37
2021	Olympic Games	Tokyo, Japan	– (f)	10,000 m	DNF
2021	European Cross Country Championships	Dublin, Ireland	1st	XC 8.0 km	26:34
2022	World Championships	Eugene, OR, United States	8th	5000 m	14:57.62
2022	European Championships	Munich, Germany	– (f)	5000 m	DNF
2022	European Cross Country Championships	Turin, Italy	1st	XC 7.662 km	26:25
2023	World Championships	Budapest, Hungary	20th (h)	5000 m	15:08.96
2024	European Championships	Rome, Italy	2nd	5000 m	14:38:62
2024	Olympic Games	Paris, France	8th	5000 m	14:43.21

=== Personal bests ===
- 1500 metres – 4:03.07 (Stockholm 2021)
- One mile – 4:26.23 (Oslo 2016) NR
- 2000 metres – 5:41.04 (Florø 2018) NBP
- 3000 metres – 8:27.02 (Oslo 2024) NR
  - 3000 metres indoor – 8:44.68 (Bærum 2019) NR
- 5000 metres – 14:31.07 (Oslo 2022) NR
- 10,000 metres – 30:50.84 (Oslo 2021)
- 2000 metres steeplechase – 6:21.39 (Stavanger 2008) NBP
- 3000 metres steeplechase – 9:13.35 (Sandnes 2017) NR

Road

- 5 km – 15:00 (Zürich 2021)
- 10 km – 30:32 (Hole 2020)
- Half marathon – 1:08:07 (New York, NY 2022)

=== National track titles ===
- Norwegian Athletics Championships
  - 1500 metres: 2013, 2015
  - 5000 metres: 2008, 2010, 2012, 2014, 2021
  - 3000 m steeplechase: 2006, 2009, 2010, 2017, 2019
