= Abderrazak Charik =

French long-distance runner

Personal information
- Born: 19 September 1997 (age 28) Batna

Sport
- Country: Algeria
- Sport: Athletics
- Event: Long-distance running

Abderrazak Charik (born 19 September 1997) is a French long-distance runner. In 2020, he competed in the men's race at the 2020 World Athletics Half Marathon Championships held in Gdynia, Poland.
