= Dieter Kersten =

Belgian long-distance runner

Personal information
- Nationality: Belgian
- Born: 25 October 1996 (age 29) Tongeren, Belgium

Sport
- Sport: Long-distance running, cross-country running
- Event: Marathon
Medal record
Representing Belgium
European Junior Championships
Bronze medal – third place	2015 Eskilstuna	10,000 m

Dieter Kersten (born 25 October 1996) is a Belgian athlete who specializes in long distance and cross-country running.

== Career ==
Kersten took part in the 2015 European Athletics Junior Championships in the 10,000 m, winning the bronze medal. In 2016, he became Belgian indoor champion in the 3000 m for the first time. In cross-country running, Kersten finished eighth in 2015 at the European U20 Cross Country Championships. The following year, he finished tenth in the U23 and won silver in the country classification with the Belgian team.

In April 2021, Kersten ran the Enschede Marathon in 2:10.22 on his marathon debut, making him eligible to participate in the 2020 Summer Olympics.
