= Ross Millington =

British long-distance runner

Personal information
- Nationality: British (English)
- Born: 19 September 1989 (age 36) Stockport, England
- Height: 173 cm (5 ft 8 in)
- Weight: 58 kg (128 lb)

Sport
- Sport: Athletics
- Event: long-distance
- Club: Stockport Harriers

Ross Arthur Millington (born 19 September 1989) is a British long-distance runner who competed at the 2016 Summer Olympics.

== Biography ==
Millington became the British 5000 metres champion after winning the 2012 British Athletics Championships.

At the 2016 Olympic Games in Rio, he represented Great Britain in the men's 10,000 metres.

In 2019, he competed in the senior men's race at the 2019 IAAF World Cross Country Championships held in Aarhus, Denmark. He finished in 64th place.
