= 2017 European Cross Country Championships =

- Organisers: EAA
- Edition: 24th
- Date: 10 December
- Host city: Šamorín, Slovakia
- Venue: Šamorín x-bionic sphere
- Events: 7
- Distances: 10.18 km – Men; 8.23 km – Women; 6.28 km – Mixed relay 8.23 km – U23 men 6.28 km – U23 women 6.28 km – Junior men 4.18 km – Junior women
- Participation: 624 athletes from 37 nations

The 2017 European Cross Country Championships was the 24th edition of the cross country running competition for European athletes. It was hosted in Šamorín, Slovakia. As of the 2017 edition, the first three athletes from each nation counted towards the team standings, rather than the top four of previous years.

== Medal summary ==
Event	Gold		Silver		Bronze	
Senior men	Kaan Kigen Özbilen (TUR)	29:45	Adel Mechaal (ESP)	29:54	Andrew Butchart (GBR)	30:00
U23 men	Jimmy Gressier (FRA)	24:35	Hugo Hay (FRA)	24:37	Yemaneberhan Crippa (ITA)	24:42
Junior men	Jakob Ingebrigtsen (NOR)	18:39	Ramazan Barbaros (TUR)	18:41	Louis Gilavert (FRA)	18:45
Senior women	Yasemin Can (TUR)	26:48	Meraf Bahta (SWE)	27:03	Karoline Bjerkeli Grøvdal (NOR)	27:04
U23 women	Alina Reh (GER)	20:22	Konstanze Klosterhalfen (GER)	20:25	Jessica Judd (GBR)	20:45
Junior women	Harriet Knowles-Jones (GBR)	13:48	Lili Anna Tóth (HUN)	13:59	Miriam Dattke (GER)	14:03
Senior men team	Turkey (TUR); Kaan Kigen Özbilen; Aras Kaya; Polat Kemboi Arıkan	17 pts	Spain (ESP); Adel Mechaal; Daniel Mateo; Ayad Lamdassem	20 pts	Great Britain (GBR); Andrew Butchart; Ben Connor; Tom Lancashire	35 pts
U23 men team	France (FRA); Jimmy Gressier; Hugo Hay; Emmanuel Roudolff Lévisse	7 pts	Belgium (BEL); Simon Debognies; Robin Hendrix; Michael Somers	26 pts	Great Britain (GBR); Mahamed Mahamed; Chris Olley; Patrick Dever	41 pts
Junior men team	Spain (ESP); Miguel González; Annasse Mahboub; Ignacio Fontes	20 pts	France (FRA); Louis Gilavert; Yani Khelaf; Ilyes Boum	27 pts	Turkey (TUR); Ramazan Barbaros; Abdurrahman Gediklioglu; Ömer Amaçtan	49 pts
Senior women team	Great Britain (GBR); Charlotte Taylor; Emelia Gorecka; Gemma Steel	23 pts	Romania (ROU); Roxana Bârcă; Ancuța Bobocel; Cristina Simion	31 pts	Turkey (TUR); Yasemin Can; Özlem Kaya; Esma Aydemir	54 pts
U23 women team	Great Britain (GBR); Jessica Judd; Amy-Eloise Neale; Amy Griffiths	12 pts	Germany (GER); Alina Reh; Konstanze Klosterhalfen; Anna Gehring	15 pts	Turkey (TUR); Emine Hatun Tuna; Büsra Nur Koku; Yayla Kiliç	46 pts
Junior women team	Great Britain (GBR); Harriet Knowles-Jones; Cari Hughes; Khahisa Mhlanga	21 pts	Italy (ITA); Nadia Battocletti; Francesca Tommasi; Elisa Cherubini	33 pts	Spain (ESP); Marta García; Lucía Rodríguez; Carla Gallardo	47 pts
Mixed relay	Great Britain (GBR); Melissa Courtney; Cameron Boyek; Sarah McDonald; Tom Marshall	18:24	Czech Republic (CZE); Simona Vrzalová; Filip Sasínek; Kristiina Mäki; Jakub Holuša	18:25	Spain (ESP); Solange Pereira; Víctor Ruiz; Esther Guerrero; Jesús Gómez	18:26

== Race results ==
=== Senior men ===
Individual race
Rank	Athlete	Country	Time (m:s)
1st place, gold medalist(s)	Kaan Kigen Özbilen	Turkey	29:45
2nd place, silver medalist(s)	Adel Mechaal	Spain	29:54
3rd place, bronze medalist(s)	Andrew Butchart	Great Britain	30:00
4	Hassan Chahdi	France	30:01
5	Soufiane Bouchikhi	Belgium	30:04
6	Ben Connor	Great Britain	30:08
7	Aras Kaya	Turkey	30:14
8	Daniel Mateo	Spain	30:16
9	Polat Kemboi Arıkan	Turkey	30:17
10	Ayad Lamdassem	Spain	30:18
11	Henrik Ingebrigtsen	Norway	30:19
12	Richard Ringer	Germany	30:24
13	Lander Tijtgat	Belgium	30:25
14	Javier Guerra	Spain	30:29
15	Sean Tobin	Ireland	30:43
16	Rui Pinto	Portugal	30:44
17	Lorenzo Dini	Italy	30:44
18	Djilali Bedrani	France	30:44
19	Hugh Armstrong	Ireland	30:46
20	Samuel Barata	Portugal	30:46

Team race
Rank	Team	Points
1st place, gold medalist(s)	Turkey; Kaan Kigen Özbilen, Aras Kaya, Polat Kemboi Arıkan	1+7+9=17
2nd place, silver medalist(s)	Spain; Adel Mechaal, Daniel Mateo, Ayad Lamdassem	2+8+10=20
3rd place, bronze medalist(s)	Great Britain; Andrew Butchart, Ben Connor, Tom Lancashire	3+6+26=35
4	France; Hassan Chahdi, Djilali Bedrani, Benjamin Choquert	4+18+34=56

=== Senior women ===
Individual race
Rank	Athlete	Country	Time (m:s)
1st place, gold medalist(s)	Yasemin Can	Turkey	26:48
2nd place, silver medalist(s)	Meraf Bahta	Sweden	27:03
3rd place, bronze medalist(s)	Karoline Bjerkeli Grøvdal	Norway	27:04
4	Roxana Bârcă	Romania	27:21
5	Elena Burkard	Germany	27:21
6	Charlotte Taylor	Great Britain	27:23
7	Fabienne Schlumpf	Switzerland	27:24
8	Emelia Gorecka	Great Britain	27:34
9	Gemma Steel	Great Britain	27:41
10	Steph Twell	Great Britain	27:43
11	Ancuța Bobocel	Romania	27:46
12	Fionnuala McCormack	Ireland	27:48
13	Trihas Gebre	Spain	27:53
14	Viktoriya Kalyuzhna	Ukraine	27:54
15	Lily Partridge	Great Britain	27:55
16	Cristina Simion	Romania	27:58
17	Nuria Lugueros	Spain	27:59
18	Sara Catarina Ribeiro	Portugal	28:00
19	Maria Larsson	Sweden	28:05
20	Marta Pen	Portugal	28:12

Team race
Rank	Team	Points
1st place, gold medalist(s)	Great Britain; Charlotte Taylor, Emelia Gorecka, Gemma Steel	6+8+9=23
2nd place, silver medalist(s)	Romania; Roxana Bârcă, Ancuța Bobocel, Cristina Simion	4+11+16=31
3rd place, bronze medalist(s)	Turkey; Yasemin Can, Özlem Kaya, Esma Aydemir	1+26+27=54
4	Portugal; Sara Catarina Ribeiro, Marta Pen, Inês Monteiro	18+20+22=60

=== Senior mixed relay ===
Rank	Team	Time (m:s)
1st place, gold medalist(s)	Great Britain; Melissa Courtney, Cameron Boyek, Sarah McDonald, Tom Marshall	18:24
2nd place, silver medalist(s)	Czech Republic; Simona Vrzalová, Filip Sasínek, Kristiina Mäki, Jakub Holuša	18:25
3rd place, bronze medalist(s)	Spain; Solange Pereira, Víctor Ruiz, Esther Guerrero, Jesús Gómez	18:26
4	Sweden; Linn Nilsson, Emil Blomberg, Hanna Hermansson, Daniel Lundgren	19:02
5	France; Élodie Normand, Martin Casse, Maëva Danois, Samir Dahmani	19:04
6	Italy; Elena Bellò, Mohad Abdikadar Sheik Ali, Chiara Casolari, Lorenzo Pilati	19:10
7	Germany; Diana Sujew, Maximilian Thorwirth, Denise Krebs, Marius Probst	19:10
8	Turkey; Sebahat Akpinar, Ramazan Özdemir, Emina Tuna, Levent Ateş	19:14
9	Ukraine; Nataliya Batrak, Yuriy Kyshchenko, Lyubov Sukhovirska, Volodymyr Kyts	19:26
10	Denmark; Line Kalstrup Schulz, Nick Jensen, Laura Møller, Jacob Ilbjerg Stengaard	19:36
11	Slovakia; Kristína Hegedüsová, Jozef Pelikán, Katarina Belová, Jozef Repčík	20:31

=== Under-23 men ===
Individual race
Rank	Athlete	Country	Time (m:s)
1st place, gold medalist(s)	Jimmy Gressier	France	24:35
2nd place, silver medalist(s)	Hugo Hay	France	24:37
3rd place, bronze medalist(s)	Yemaneberhan Crippa	Italy	24:42
4	Emmanuel Roudolff Lévisse	France	24:43
5	Carlos Mayo	Spain	24:46
6	Simon Debognies	Belgium	24:47
7	Alexis Miellet	France	24:47
8	Topi Raitanen	Finland	24:47
9	Robin Hendrix	Belgium	24:48
10	Süleyman Bekmezci	Turkey	24:49
11	Michael Somers	Belgium	24:49
12	Mahamed Mahamed	Great Britain	24:50
13	Chris Olley	Great Britain	24:52
14	Dorian Boulvin	Belgium	24:58
15	Mohamed-Amine El Bouajaji	France	25:02

Team race
Rank	Team	Points
1st place, gold medalist(s)	France; Jimmy Gressier, Hugo Hay, Emmanuel Roudolff Lévisse	1+2+4=7
2nd place, silver medalist(s)	Belgium; Simon Debognies, Robin Hendrix, Michael Somers	6+9+11=26
3rd place, bronze medalist(s)	Great Britain; Mahamed Mahamed, Chris Olley, Patrick Dever	12+13+16=41
4	Spain; Carlos Mayo, Sergio Paniagua, Yago Rojo	5+17+23=45

=== Under-23 women ===
Individual race
Rank	Athlete	Country	Time (m:s)
1st place, gold medalist(s)	Alina Reh	Germany	20:22
2nd place, silver medalist(s)	Konstanze Klosterhalfen	Germany	20:25
3rd place, bronze medalist(s)	Jessica Judd	Great Britain	20:45
4	Amy-Eloise Neale	Great Britain	20:59
5	Amy Griffiths	Great Britain	21:02
6	Isabelle Brauer	Sweden	21:09
7	Anna Emilie Møller	Denmark	21:14
8	Weronika Pyzik	Poland	21:18
9	Mhairi Maclennan	Great Britain	21:26
10	Phoebe Law	Great Britain	21:26
11	Emine Tuna	Turkey	21:27
12	Anna Gehring	Germany	21:28
13	Philippa Bowden	Great Britain	21:29
14	Valeriya Zinenko	Ukraine	21:32
15	Emma Oudiou	France	21:34

Team race
Rank	Team	Points
1st place, gold medalist(s)	Great Britain; Jessica Judd, Amy-Eloise Neale, Amy Griffiths	3+4+5=12
2nd place, silver medalist(s)	Germany; Alina Reh, Konstanze Klosterhalfen, Anna Gehring	1+2+12=15
3rd place, bronze medalist(s)	Turkey; Emine Tuna, Büsra Koku, Yayla Kiliç	11+16+19=46
4	Sweden; Isabelle Brauer, Sara Christiansson, Isabella Andersson	6+21+25=52

=== Junior men ===
Individual race
Rank	Athlete	Country	Time (m:s)
1st place, gold medalist(s)	Jakob Ingebrigtsen	Norway	18:39
2nd place, silver medalist(s)	Ramazan Barbaros	Turkey	18:41
3rd place, bronze medalist(s)	Louis Gilavert	France	18:45
4	Yani Khelaf	France	18:47
5	Miguel González	Spain	18:48
6	Adrian Garcea	Romania	18:48
7	Annasse Mahboub	Spain	18:49
8	Ignacio Fontes	Spain	18:50
9	Mario García	Spain	18:50
10	Markus Görger	Germany	18:50
11	Tim van de Velde	Belgium	18:51
12	Dorin Andrei Rusu	Romania	18:52
13	Tariku Novales	Spain	18:54
14	Matthew Willis	Great Britain	18:57
15	Andreas Holst Lindgreen	Denmark	19:01

Team race
Rank	Team	Points
1st place, gold medalist(s)	Spain; Miguel González, Annasse Mahboub, Ignacio Fontes	5+7+8=20
2nd place, silver medalist(s)	France; Louis Gilavert, Yani Khelaf, Ilyes Boum	3+4+20=27
3rd place, bronze medalist(s)	Turkey; Ramazan Barbaros, Abdurrahman Gediklioglu, Ömer Amaçtan	2+21+26=49
4	Belgium; Tim van de Velde, Dries De Smet, John Heymans	11+16+24=51

=== Junior women ===
Individual race
Rank	Athlete	Country	Time (m:s)
1st place, gold medalist(s)	Harriet Knowles-Jones	Great Britain	13:48
2nd place, silver medalist(s)	Lili Tóth	Hungary	13:59
3rd place, bronze medalist(s)	Miriam Dattke	Germany	14:03
4	Jasmijn Lau	Netherlands	14:05
5	Nadia Battocletti	Italy	14:07
6	Francesca Tommasi	Italy	14:07
7	Mathilde Sénéchal	France	14:08
8	Alberte Kjær Pedersen	Denmark	14:09
9	Cari Hughes	Great Britain	14:15
10	Sophie Murphy	Ireland	14:15
11	Khahisa Mhlanga	Great Britain	14:16
12	Niamh Brown	Great Britain	14:17
13	Marta García	Spain	14:17
14	Tatsiana Shabanava	Belarus	14:17
15	Lucía Rodríguez	Spain	14:18

Team race
Rank	Team	Points
1st place, gold medalist(s)	Great Britain; Harriet Knowles-Jones, Cari Hughes, Khahisa Mhlanga	1+9+11=21
2nd place, silver medalist(s)	Italy; Nadia Battocletti, Francesca Tommasi, Elisa Cherubini, Micol Majori, Laura De Marco	5+6+22=33
3rd place, bronze medalist(s)	Spain; Marta García, Lucía Rodríguez, Carla Gallardo	13+15+19=47
4	France; Mathilde Sénéchal, Alexa Lemitre, Julie Lejarraga	7+23+30=60

== Medal table ==
Rank	Nation	Gold	Silver	Bronze	Total
1	Great Britain (GBR)	5	0	4	9
2	Turkey (TUR)	3	1	3	7
3	France (FRA)	2	2	1	5
4	Spain (ESP)	1	2	2	5
5	Germany (GER)	1	2	1	4
6	Norway (NOR)	1	0	1	2
7	Italy (ITA)	0	1	1	2
8	Belgium (BEL)	0	1	0	1
8	Czech Republic (CZE)	0	1	0	1
8	Hungary (HUN)	0	1	0	1
8	Romania (ROU)	0	1	0	1
8	Sweden (SWE)	0	1	0	1
Totals (12 entries)		13	13	13	39
