= Cameron Boyek =

British middle-distance runner (born 1993)

Personal information
- Born: 9 October 1993 (age 33)

Sport
- Country: Great Britain; Scotland
- Sport: Athletics
- Event: Middle-distance running
Medal record
Men's athletics
Representing Great Britain
European Cross Country Championships
Gold medal – first place	2017 Samorin	Mixed relay

Cameron Boyek (born 9 October 1993) is a British cross country and middle-distance runner. Competing on the roads, he was the UK champion in the mile run in 2026 and was a gold medalist in the mixed relay competing for Great Britain at the 2017 European Cross Country Championships.

== Biography ==
From Hunwick, and member of Shildon Athletics Club since he was 12 years old in Shildon, County Durham, he attended St John's Catholic School in Bishop Auckland.

Boyek has competed for Scotland, and has also been based in Loughborough, England. Boyek won a gold medal with the British team at the 2017 European Cross Country Championships in the mixed relay, in Samorin, Slovakia, running alongside Melissa Courtney, Sarah McDonald and Tom Marshall.

Boyek did not competed in a 1500 metres for seven years between 2017 and 2024, after a long and sustained period of injuries and illness, with uncertainty around his future in the sport. In June 2025, Boyek ran a personal best of 3:37.32 for the distance, prior to improving to 3:35.51 at the British Milers Club Grand Prix in Trafford in August, the fastest 1500 m time recorded across the Grand Prix series that year, and the fifth quickest in BMC history. Competing in Cardiff in the British Cross Challenge in November, Boyek placed third in the one mile relay trials for the 2025 European Cross Country Championships.

In June 2026, Boyek qualified for the final of the 1500 metres at the 2026 British Championships, placing seventh overall. Boyek won the UK One Mile Road Race titles at the Vitality Westminster Mile in London on 26 September, running 4:02.
