= Melissa Courtney-Bryant =

British middle-distance runner

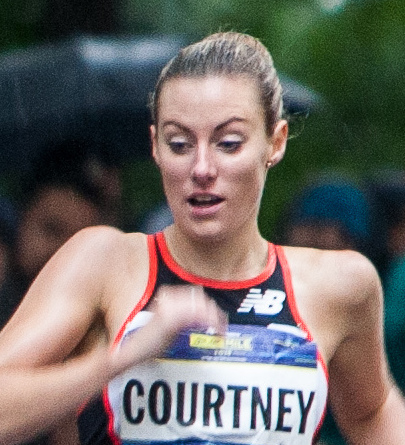
- Courtney-Bryant in 2018

Personal information
- Born: 30 August 1993 (age 32) Poole, England
- Height: 1.64 m (5 ft 4 1/2 in)
- Weight: 53 kg (117 lb)

Sport
- Country: Great Britain & N.I. Wales
- Sport: Athletics
- Events: Middle-, long-distance running
- Club: Poole AC
- Coached by: Rob Denmark
Medal record
Women's athletics
Representing Great Britain
European Indoor Championships
Silver medal – second place	2025 Apeldoorn	3000 m
Bronze medal – third place	2019 Glasgow	3000 m
Bronze medal – third place	2023 Istanbul	3000 m
European Cross Country Championships
Gold medal – first place	2017 Šamorín	Mixed relay
Representing Wales
Commonwealth Games
Bronze medal – third place	2018 Gold Coast	1500 m

Melissa Courtney-Bryant (born 30 August 1993) is a British middle- and long-distance runner. She won the bronze medal in the 1500 metres at the 2018 Commonwealth Games and three European indoor medals for the 3000 metres; silver at the 2025 Championships, and bronze at both at the 2019 and 2023 European Indoor Championships.

Courtney-Bryant is a two-time British indoor champion.

== Athletics career ==
Born in Poole, Dorset, she initially focused on swimming, but switched to running. She joined Poole Athletic Club and worked under coach Mark Pauley from the age of twelve, as well as her father Mark as more runners joined the club. She credits her partner and fellow athlete, Ashley Bryant, which encouraging her to up her performance after a period of stagnation. After graduating from Brunel University London with a degree in sports psychology, she moved to train at Loughborough in 2017 to work with Rob Denmark.

Courtney made big improvements to her 800 m and 1500 m bests in 2013 and won the latter event at the BUCS Championships indoor and out that year. In the 2014 indoor season, she won the Welsh indoor title and came third at the British Indoor Championships. During the 2015 season her 800 m and 1500 m bests were brought down to 2:05.48 and 4:09.74 minutes and she made her international debut at the 2015 European Athletics U23 Championships, placing 10th in the 1500 m. Though she was seventh nationally at the 2016 British Athletics Championships, she ran a best of 4:07.55 minutes and gained selection for the 2016 European Athletics Championships, competing in the first round only. She teamed up with Cameron Boyek, Sarah McDonald, and Tom Marshall to take the gold medal in the inaugural mixed relay event at the 2017 European Cross Country Championships.

After winning the 1500 m British Universities title, she represented Great Britain at the 2017 Universiade and placed fifth in the final. That winter, she travelled to train in Iten in Kenya. Courtney was chosen to represent Wales at the 2018 Commonwealth Games and she won 1500 m bronze medal in a personal best time of 4:03.44 minutes, beaten only by Caster Semenya and Beatrice Chepkoech.

She won the 3000 m event at the Karlsruhe meeting of the 2019 IAAF World Indoor Tour with a time of 8:43.36. In March that year, she took bronze over the same distance at the European Indoor Championships, setting her personal best in the process.

On 24 December 2022, Courtney-Bryant set unofficial parkrun world record of 15 minutes 31 seconds in Poole, slicing six seconds off Samantha Harrison's female best mark.

== Statistics ==
=== International competitions ===
Representing Great Britain / Wales
Year	Competition	Venue	Position	Event	Time
2015	European U23 Championships	Tallinn, Estonia	10th	1500 m	4:17.49
2016	European Championships	Amsterdam, Netherlands	18th (h)	1500 m	4:18.74
2017	Universiade	Taipei, Taiwan	5th	1500 m	4:21.14
2017	European Cross Country Championships	Šamorín, Slovakia	1st	Mixed relay	18:24
2018	Commonwealth Games	Gold Coast, Australia	3rd	1500 m	4:03.44
2018	Commonwealth Games	Gold Coast, Australia	9th	5000 m	15:46.60
2018	European Championships	Berlin, Germany	5th	5000 m	15:04.75
2019	European Indoor Championships	Glasgow, United Kingdom	3rd	3000 m i	8:38.22
2022	World Championships	Eugene, United States	31st (h)	1500 m	4:09.07
2022	European Championships	Munich, Germany	24th (h)	1500 m	4:09.11
2023	European Indoor Championships	Istanbul, Turkey	3rd	3000 m i	8:41.19
2023	World Championships	Budapest, Hungary	12th	1500 m	4:03.31
2025	European Indoor Championships	Apeldoorn, Netherlands	2nd	3000 m	8:52.92
2025	World Championships	Tokyo, Japan	34th (h)	5000 m	15:27.70
2026	Commonwealth Games	Glasgow, United Kingdom	15th (h)	Mile	4:39.50

=== Personal bests ===
- 800 metres – 2:04.03 (Watford 2017)
- 1500 metres – 4:01.81 (Stockholm 2020)
  - 1500 metres indoor – 4:04.79 (Liévin 2021)
- Mile run – 4:23.15 (London 2017)
- 3000 metres – 8:39.20 (Birmingham 2018)
  - 3000 metres indoor – 8:28.69 (New York City 2025)
- 5000 metres – 14:53.82 (Stockholm 2019)

Road

- 5K run – 15:58 (Barrowford 2017)
- 10K run – 33:14 (Houilles 2016)

Other

- Parkrun – 15:31 (Poole 2022)

=== National titles ===
- British Indoor Athletics Championships
  - 3000 metres: 2020, 2023
