= 2015 European Athletics U23 Championships – Women's 1500 metres =

The women's 1500 metres event at the 2015 European Athletics U23 Championships was held in Tallinn, Estonia, at Kadriorg Stadium on 12 July.

== Medalists ==
Gold	Amela Terzić; Serbia
Silver	Sofia Ennaoui; Poland
Bronze	Nataliya Pryshchepa; Ukraine

== Results ==
=== Final ===
12 July

Rank	Name	Nationality	Time	Notes
1st place, gold medalist(s)	Amela Terzić	Serbia	4:04.77	NR PB
2nd place, silver medalist(s)	Sofia Ennaoui	Poland	4:04.90	PB
3rd place, bronze medalist(s)	Nataliya Pryshchepa	Ukraine	4:06.29	PB
4	Rhianwedd Price	United Kingdom	4:10.25	
5	Anastasiya Kalina	Russia	4:10.64	
6	Marta Pen	Portugal	4:10.98	PB
7	Marta Pérez	Spain	4:14.21	PB
8	Hanna Klein	Germany	4:16.01	
9	Yekaterina Sokolova	Russia	4:16.18	
10	Melissa Courtney	United Kingdom	4:17.49	
11	Molly Renfer	Switzerland	4:18.36	
12	Viktoria Yarashevich	Belarus	4:22.89	
13	Giulia Aprile	Italy	4:35.46	

== Participation ==
According to an unofficial count, 13 athletes from 11 countries participated in the event.

- Belarus (1)
- Germany (1)
- Italy (1)
- Poland (1)
- Portugal (1)
- Russia (2)
- Serbia (1)
- Spain (1)
- Switzerland (1)
- Ukraine (1)
- United Kingdom (2)
