= 2016 European Athletics Championships – Women's 1500 metres =

Women's 1500 metres at the 2016 European Athletics Championships
- Venue: Olympic Stadium
- Location: Amsterdam
- Dates: July 8 (heats); July 10 (final)
- Competitors: 21 from 16 nations
- Winning time: 4:33.00

Medalists
gold medal	Angelika Cichocka	Poland
silver medal	Sifan Hassan	Netherlands
bronze medal	Ciara Mageean	Ireland

The women's 1500 metres at the 2016 European Athletics Championships took place at the Olympic Stadium from 8 and 10 July.

== Records ==
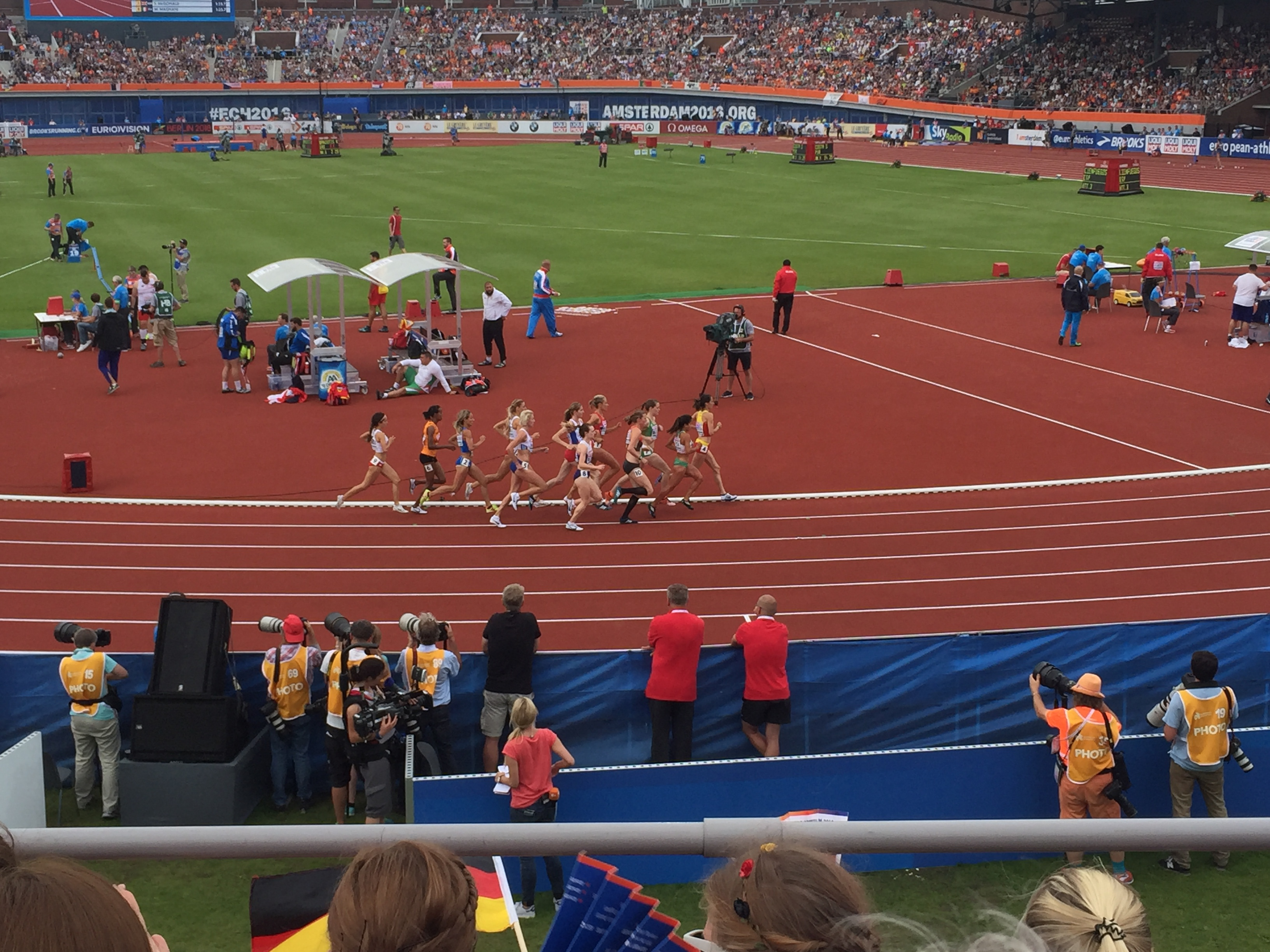
The final

Standing records prior to the 2014 European Athletics Championships
World record	Genzebe Dibaba (ETH)	3:50.07	Monaco	17 July 2015
European record	Tatyana Kazankina (URS)	3:52.47	Zürich, Switzerland	13 August 1980
Championship record	Tatyana Tomashova (RUS)	3:56.91	Gothenburg, Sweden	13 August 2006
World Leading	Faith Chepngetich Kipyegon (KEN)	3:56.41	Eugene, United States	28 May 2016
European Leading	Laura Muir (GBR)	4:00.53	Oslo, Norway	9 June 2016

== Schedule ==
Date	Time	Round
8 July 2016	18:15	Round 1
10 July 2016	17:45	Final

All times are local times (UTC+2)

== Results ==
=== Round 1 ===
First 4 in each heat (Q) and 4 best performers (q) advance to the Semifinals.

Rank	Heat	Name	Nationality	Time	Note
1	2	Amela Terzić	Serbia	4:09.71	Q
2	2	Lucia Hrivnák Klocová	Slovakia	4:10.90	Q
3	2	Sofia Ennaoui	Poland	4:10.99	Q
4	2	Sarah McDonald	Great Britain	4:11.14	Q
5	2	Solange Andreia Pereira	Spain	4:11.48	q
6	2	Ingvill Måkestad Bovim	Norway	4:11.54	q
7	2	Maren Kock	Germany	4:11.67	q
8	2	Margherita Magnani	Italy	4:11.78	q
9	2	Florina Pierdevara	Romania	4:12.37	
10	1	Sifan Hassan	Netherlands	4:13.45	Q
11	1	Angelika Cichocka	Poland	4:13.47	Q
12	1	Ciara Mageean	Ireland	4:13.61	Q
13	1	Marta Pen	Portugal	4:13.74	Q
14	1	Daryia Barysevich	Belarus	4:14.06	
15	1	Danuta Urbanik	Poland	4:14.86	
16	2	Anastasia-Panayiota Marinakou	Greece	4:16.53	
17	1	Marta Pérez	Spain	4:17.24	
18	1	Melissa Courtney	Great Britain	4:18.74	
19	1	Claudia Bobocea	Romania	4:18.98	
20	1	Liina Tšernov	Estonia	4:29.47	
	1	Nataliya Pryshchepa	Ukraine	DNF	

=== Final ===
Rank	Name	Nationality	Time	Note
1st place, gold medalist(s)	Angelika Cichocka	Poland	4:33.00	
2nd place, silver medalist(s)	Sifan Hassan	Netherlands	4:33.76	
3rd place, bronze medalist(s)	Ciara Mageean	Ireland	4:33.78	
4	Ingvill Måkestad Bovim	Norway	4:34.15	
5	Marta Pen	Portugal	4:34.41	
6	Maren Kock	Germany	4:34.54	
7	Sofia Ennaoui	Poland	4:34.84	
8	Solange Andreia Pereira	Spain	4:34.88	
9	Sarah McDonald	Great Britain	4:34.93	
10	Lucia Hrivnák Klocová	Slovakia	4:35.61	
11	Margherita Magnani	Italy	4:36.51	
12	Amela Terzić	Serbia	4:37.70	
