= 2017 European Athletics Indoor Championships – Women's 1500 metres =

The women's 1500 metres event at the 2017 European Athletics Indoor Championships was held on 3 March 2017 at 17:05 (heats) and on 4 March 19:45 (final) local time.

== Medalists ==
Gold	Silver	Bronze
Laura Muir; Great Britain	Konstanze Klosterhalfen; Germany	Sofia Ennaoui; Poland

== Records ==
Standing records prior to the 2017 European Athletics Indoor Championships
World record	Genzebe Dibaba (ETH)	3:55.17	Karlsruhe, Germany	1 February 2014
European record	Abeba Aregawi (SWE)	3:57.91	Stockholm, Sweden	6 February 2014
Championship record	Doina Melinte (ROU)	4:02.54	Piraeus, Greece	3 March 1985
World Leading	Genzebe Dibaba (ETH)	3:58.80	Toruń, Poland	10 February 2017
European Leading	Sifan Hassan (NED)	4:03.05	New York City, United States	11 February 2017

== Results ==
=== Heats ===
Qualification: First 2 in each heat (Q) and the next 3 fastest (q) advance to the Final.

Rank	Heat	Athlete	Nationality	Time	Note
1	1	Laura Muir	Great Britain	4:10.28	Q
2	1	Amela Terzić	Serbia	4:10.35	Q, NR
3	1	Konstanze Klosterhalfen	Germany	4:10.37	q
4	3	Sofia Ennaoui	Poland	4:11.91	Q
5	2	Meraf Bahta	Sweden	4:12.39	Q
6	2	Sarah McDonald	Great Britain	4:12.50	Q
7	2	Daryia Barysevich	Belarus	4:12.52	q, PB
8	2	Ciara Mageean	Ireland	4:12.81	q
9	3	Luiza Gega	Albania	4:13.40	Q
10	3	Simona Vrzalová	Czech Republic	4:14.31	
11	2	Olena Sidorska	Ukraine	4:14.95	PB
12	1	Katarzyna Broniatowska	Poland	4:15.02	
13	3	Solange Andreia Pereira	Spain	4:15.09	
14	3	Linn Nilsson	Sweden	4:15.25	
15	2	Meryem Akdağ	Turkey	4:16.08	
16	1	Claudia Bobocea	Romania	4:16.98	
17	1	Özlem Kaya	Turkey	4:20.37	
18	3	Kerry O'Flaherty	Ireland	4:23.82	
19	1	Natalia Evangelidou	Cyprus	4:24.61	

=== Final ===
Rank	Athlete	Nationality	Time	Note
1st place, gold medalist(s)	Laura Muir	Great Britain	4:02.39	CR
2nd place, silver medalist(s)	Konstanze Klosterhalfen	Germany	4:04.45	PB
3rd place, bronze medalist(s)	Sofia Ennaoui	Poland	4:06.59	
4	Meraf Bahta	Sweden	4:07.90	
5	Luiza Gega	Albania	4:11.64	
6	Sarah McDonald	Great Britain	4:13.67	
7	Daryia Barysevich	Belarus	4:13.81	
8	Amela Terzić	Serbia	4:25.15	
	Ciara Mageean	Ireland	DNF	
