= 2014 World Junior Championships in Athletics – Women's 3000 metres steeplechase =

The women's 3000 metres steeplechase at the 2014 World Junior Championships in Athletics was held at Hayward Field from 24 to 26 July.

== Medalists ==
Gold	Ruth Jebet (BHR)
Silver	Rosefline Chepngetich (KEN)
Bronze	Daisy Jepkemei (KEN)

== Records ==
Standing records prior to the 2014 World Junior Championships in Athletics
World Junior Record	Birtukan Adamu (ETH)	9:20.37	Rome, Italy	26 May 2011
Championship Record	Christine Kambua Muyanga (KEN)	9:31.35	Bydgoszcz, Poland	10 July 2008
World Junior Leading	Ruth Jebet (BHR)	9:27.90	Marrakesh, Morocco	8 June 2014
Broken records during the 2014 World Junior Championships in Athletics

== Results ==
=== heats ===
==== Heat 1 ====
1	Weynshet Ansa (ETH)	9:56.06	Q	PB
2	Daisy Jepkemei (KEN)	9:56.07	Q	
3	Ruth Jebet (BHR)	9:56.08	Q	
4	Rosa Flanagan (NZL)	10:09.43	Q	
5	Amy-Eloise Neale (GBR)	10:17.88	Q	
6	Ronja Bohrer (GER)	10:25.43		
7	Ekin Esra Kalir (TUR)	10:29.37		PB
8	Hadjer Soukhal (ALG)	10:30.91		NJR
9	Regan Yee (CAN)	10:32.04		PB
10	Charlotte Sijmens (BEL)	10:32.91		
11	Elena Craciun (ROU)	10:33.02		PB
12	Lucy Basilio (PER)	10:39.76		
13	Alisa Vaino (FIN)	10:40.08		
14	Hope Schmelzle (USA)	10:41.38		
15	Carolina Lozano (ARG)	10:49.41		
16	Barblin Remund (SUI)	10:54.47		
17	Marta Bote (ESP)	10:58.33		
	Anezka Drahotova (CZE)	DNS		
	Kate Spencer (AUS)	DNS		

==== Heat 2 ====
1	Rosefline Chepngetich (KEN)	9:52.63	Q	
2	Buzuayehu Mohamed (ETH)	9:52.97	Q	
3	Zulema Arenas (PER)	9:54.12	Q	AJR
4	Rosemary Mumo Katua (BHR)	10:07.18	Q	PB
5	Minttu Hukka (FIN)	10:08.02	Q	
6	Elinor Purrier (USA)	10:08.33	q	PB
7	Emma Oudiou (FRA)	10:12.69	q	NJR
8	Tina Donder (GER)	10:14.51	q	PB
9	Paula Gil (ESP)	10:17.17	q	PB
10	Stella Radford (AUS)	10:19.29	q	PB
11	Mihaela Petrea (ROU)	10:19.79		PB
12	Yevheniia Prokofieva (UKR)	10:25.60		PB
13	Sumeyye Erol (TUR)	10:33.37		
14	Jessy Lacourse (CAN)	10:37.13		PB
15	Carolina Johnson (SWE)	10:40.68		
16	Anne Serine Rossland (NOR)	10:42.56		PB
17	Julia Millonig (AUT)	10:42.95		
18	Katie Ingle (GBR)	10:43.03		
19	Kristina Bozic (CRO)	11:03.73		
20	Chiara Scherrer (SUI)	11:05.00		

==== Final ====
1	Ruth Jebet (BHR)	9:36.74	
2	Rosefline Chepngetich (KEN)	9:40.28	PB
3	Daisy Jepkemei (KEN)	9:47.65	SB
4	Buzuayehu Mohamed (ETH)	9:48.66	
5	Weynshet Ansa (ETH)	9:59.31	
6	Zulema Arenas (PER)	9:59.38	
7	Rosa Flanagan (NZL)	10:04.01	
8	Rosemary Mumo Katua (BHR)	10:18.01	
9	Elinor Purrier (USA)	10:21.59	
10	Tina Donder (GER)	10:24.04	
11	Amy-Eloise Neale (GBR)	10:25.14	
12	Minttu Hukka (FIN)	10:29.00	
13	Stella Radford (AUS)	10:31.47	
14	Paula Gil (ESP)	10:56.51	
15	Emma Oudiou (FRA)	11:13.39	
