= Rachael Zena Chebet =

Ugandan long-distance runner

Rachael Zena Chebet (born 5 November 1996) is a Ugandan long-distance runner.

She finished seventh at the 2016 African Championships (5000 m), seventh at the 2019 African Games (10,000 m) and eighteenth at the 2019 World Championships (10,000 m).

She also competed at the 2013 World Youth Championships (1500 m) without reaching the final, and did not finish her race at the 2016 African Championships (10,000 m).

In cross-country running she competed in the junior races at the 2013 and 2015 World Cross Country Championships. At the 2017 World Cross Country Championships she finished seventeenth in the senior race and fourth in the team competition. At the 2019 World Cross Country Championships she finished fourth in the senior race and won a bronze medal in the team competition. In 2020, she competed in the women's half marathon at the 2020 World Athletics Half Marathon Championships held in Gdynia, Poland.

Her personal best times are 15:49.03 minutes in the 5000 metres, achieved in July 2019 in Kampala; 32:41.93 minutes in the 10,000 metres, achieved at the 2019 World Championships in Doha; 32:37 minutes in the 10 kilometres, achieved in June 2019 in Ölde; and 1:16:46 hours in the half marathon, achieved in December 2018 in Chon Buri.
