= 2019 European Athletics Indoor Championships – Women's 1500 metres =

Women's 1500 metres at the 2019 European Athletics Indoor Championships
- Venue: Emirates Arena
- Location: Glasgow, Scotland
- Dates: 1 March 2019 (heats); 4 March 2019 (final)
- Competitors: 24 from 16 nations
- Winning time: 4:05.92

Medalists
gold medal	Laura Muir	Great Britain
silver medal	Sofia Ennaoui	Poland
bronze medal	Ciara Mageean	Ireland

The women's 1500 metres event at the 2019 European Athletics Indoor Championships was held on 1 March 2019 at 19:10 (heats), and on 3 March 2019 at 20:12 (final) local time.

== Medalists ==
Gold	Silver|	Bronze
Laura Muir; Great Britain	Sofia Ennaoui; Poland	Ciara Mageean; Ireland

== Records ==
Standing records prior to the 2019 European Athletics Indoor Championships
World record	Genzebe Dibaba (ETH)	3:55.17	Karlsruhe, Germany	1 February 2014
European record	Abeba Aregawi (SWE)	3:57.91	Stockholm, Sweden	6 February 2014
Championship record	Laura Muir (GBR)	4:02.39	Belgrade, Serbia	4 March 2017
World Leading	Genzebe Dibaba (ETH)	3:59.08	Sabadell, Spain	6 February 2019
European Leading	Sofia Ennaoui (POL)	4:05.22	Ostrava, Czech Republic	12 February 2019

== Results ==
=== Heats ===
Qualification: First 2 in each heat (Q) and the next 3 fastest (q) advance to the Final.

Rank	Heat	Athlete	Nationality	Time	Note
1	2	Marta Pérez	Spain	4:08.05	Q, PB
2	2	Simona Vrzalová	Czech Republic	4:08.06	Q
3	2	Ciara Mageean	Ireland	4:08.15	q
4	2	Daryia Barysevich	Belarus	4:08.31	q, PB
5	1	Laura Muir	Great Britain	4:09.29	Q
6	1	Katsiaryna Karneyenka	Belarus	4:09.32	Q, PB
7	1	Claudia Bobocea	Romania	4:09.67	q
8	1	Maruša Mišmaš	Slovenia	4:09.81	
9	2	Anna Silvander	Sweden	4:11.01	PB
10	1	Yolanda Ngarambe	Sweden	4:12.16	
11	2	Jemma Reekie	Great Britain	4:13.44	PB
12	3	Amela Terzić	Serbia	4:16.51	Q
13	3	Sofia Ennaoui	Poland	4:16.78	Q
14	1	Kristiina Mäki	Czech Republic	4:17.19	
15	3	Sarah McDonald	Great Britain	4:17.64	SB
16	1	Sara Kuivisto	Finland	4:18.68	
17	3	Diana Mezuliáníková	Czech Republic	4:18.89	
18	3	Hanna Hermansson	Sweden	4:19.88	
19	1	Natalija Piliušina	Lithuania	4:20.98	
20	3	Vera Hoffmann	Luxembourg	4:21.07	
21	3	Solange Andreia Pereira	Spain	4:24.57	
22	2	Özlem Kaya	Turkey	4:29.50	
	2	Caterina Granz	Germany	DNF	
	3	Luiza Gega	Albania	DNS	

=== Final ===
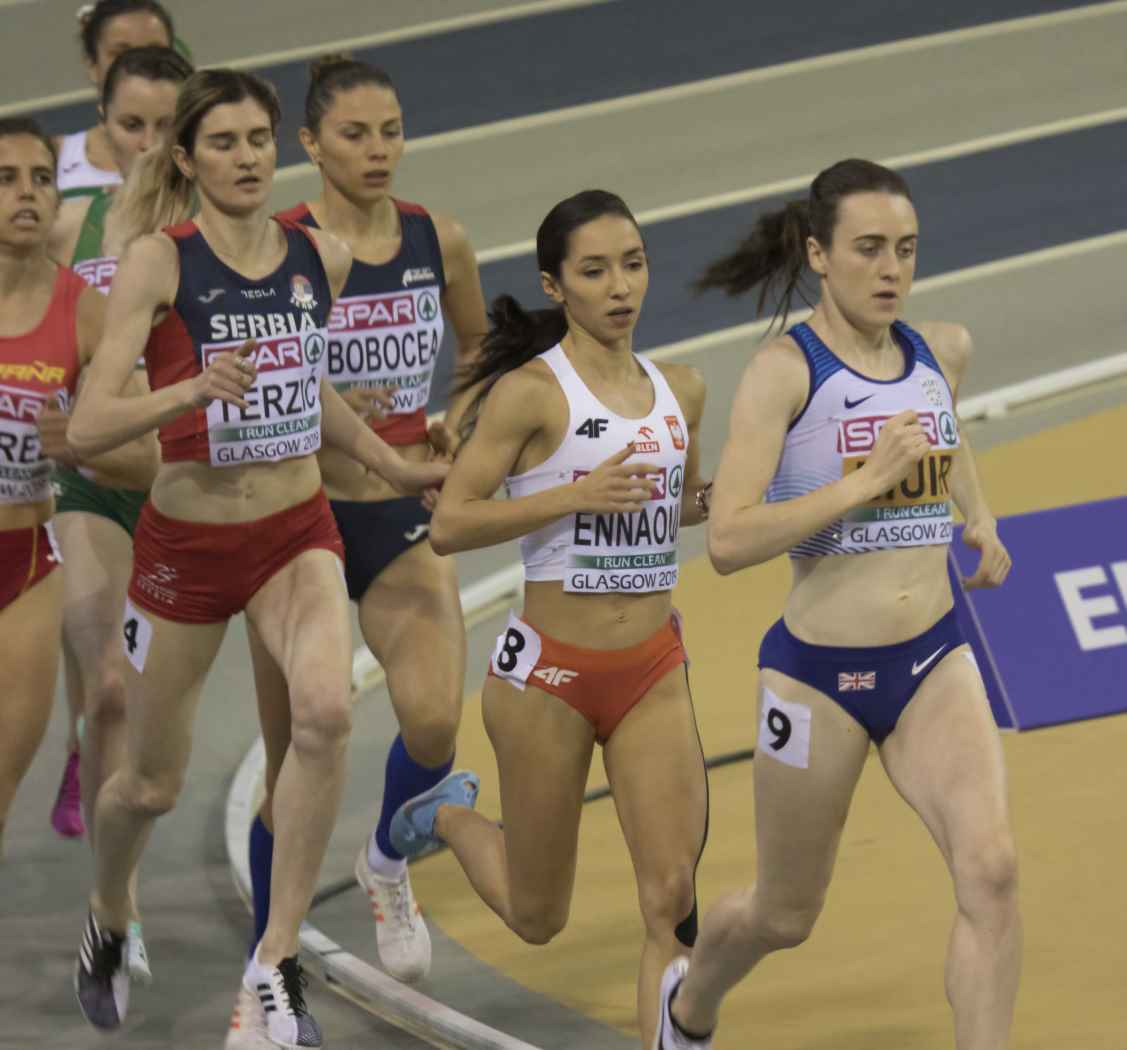
The final

Rank	Name	Nationality	Time	Notes
1st place, gold medalist(s)	Laura Muir	Great Britain	4:05.92	
2nd place, silver medalist(s)	Sofia Ennaoui	Poland	4:09.30	
3rd place, bronze medalist(s)	Ciara Mageean	Ireland	4:09.43	
4	Katsiaryna Karneyenka	Belarus	4:11.59	
5	Daryia Barysevich	Belarus	4:11.92	
6	Simona Vrzalová	Czech Republic	4:12.16	
7	Claudia Bobocea	Romania	4:13.40	
8	Marta Pérez	Spain	4:13.56	
9	Amela Terzić	Serbia	4:24.20	
