= Solange Pereira =

Portuguese-Spanish middle-distance runner

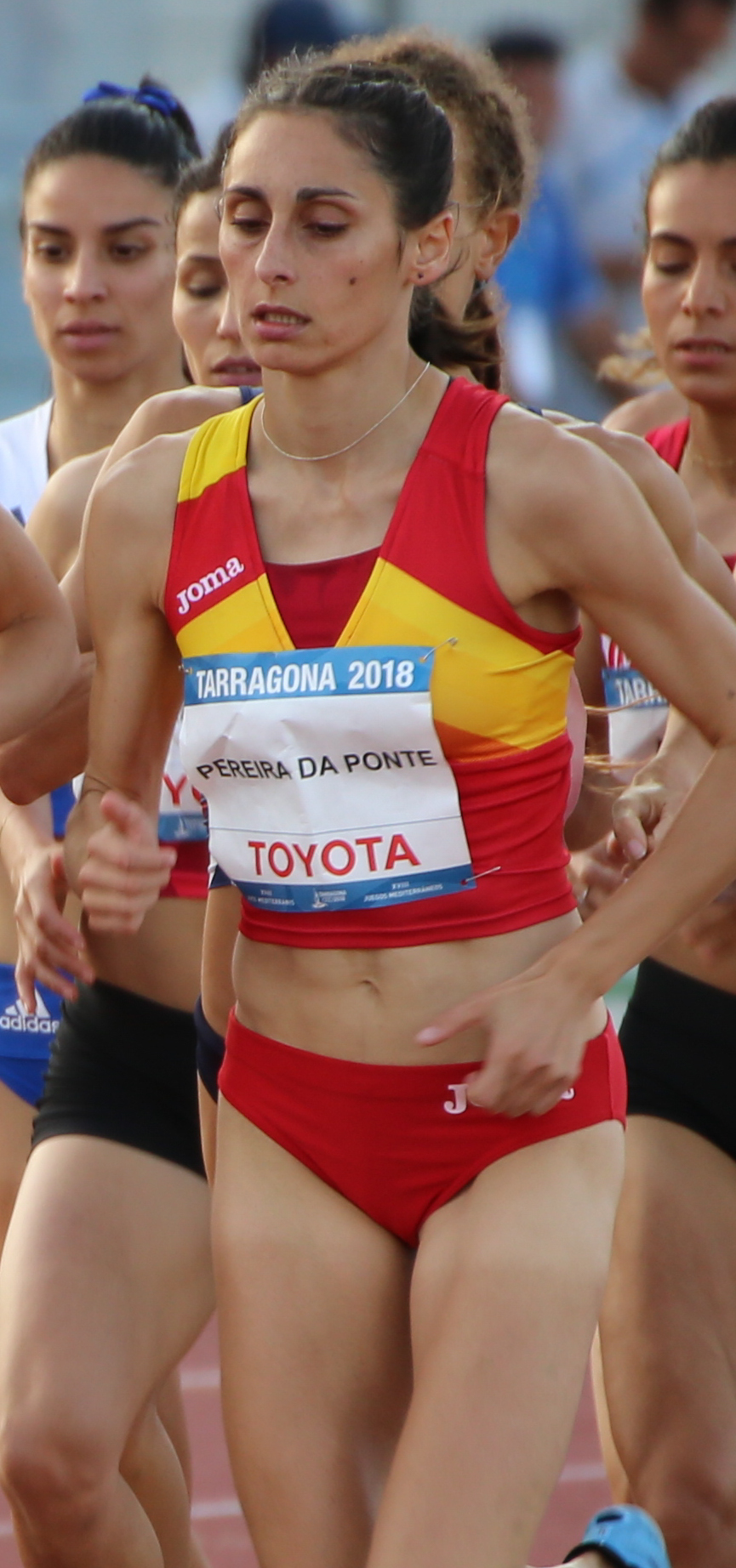
- Solange Pereira in 2018

Personal information
- Born: 16 December 1989 (age 36)
- Education: UNED Pontevedra
- Height: 1.68 m (5 ft 6 in)
- Weight: 53 kg (117 lb)

Sport
- Sport: Athletics
- Event: 1500 metres
- Club: Valencia Terra i Mar

Solange Andreia Pereira da Ponte (born 16 December 1989) is a Portuguese-Spanish middle-distance runner specialising in the 1500 metres. She represented Spain at the 2017 World Championships without reaching the semifinals. In addition, she reached the final at the 2016 European Championships.

== International competitions ==
Year	Competition	Venue	Position	Event	Notes
Representing Portugal
2009	European U23 Championships	Kaunas, Lithuania	22nd (h)	1500 m	4:25.72
Representing Spain
2011	European U23 Championships	Ostrava, Czech Republic	14th (h)	1500 m	4:19.72
2013	Universiade	Kazan, Russia	15th (h)	1500 m	4:26.56
2014	Ibero-American Championships	São Paulo, Brazil	5th	1500 m	4:21.26
2016	European Championships	Amsterdam, Netherlands	8th	1500 m	4:34.88
2017	European Indoor Championships	Belgrade, Serbia	13th (h)	1500 m	4:15.09
2017	World Cross Country Championships	Kampala, Uganda	8th	4 x 2 km mixed relay	24:29
2017	World Championships	London, United Kingdom	21st (h)	1500 m	4:06.63
2017	European Cross Country Championships	Šamorín, Slovakia	3rd	4 x 1,5 km mixed relay	18:26
2018	Mediterranean Games	Tarragona, Spain	4th	1500 m	4:15.97
2018	European Championships	Berlin, Germany	16th (h)	1500 m	4:10.63
2018	Ibero-American Championships	Trujillo, Peru	1st	1500 m	4:18.31
2018	Ibero-American Championships	Trujillo, Peru	3rd	4 × 400 m relay	3:38.32
2018	European Cross Country Championships	Tilburg, Netherlands	1st	4 x 1,5 km mixed relay	16:10
2019	European Indoor Championships	Glasgow, United Kingdom	21st (h)	1500 m	4:24.57
2022	Ibero-American Championships	La Nucía, Spain	1st	1500 m	4:15.87

== Personal bests ==
Outdoor

- 400 metres – 57.50 (Vigo 2009)
- 800 metres – 2:06.18 (Vigo 2013)
- 1000 metres – 2:45.37 (Pontevedra 2014)
- 1500 metres – 4:06.39 (Rabat 2017)
- 3000 metres – 9:23.51 (Barcelona 2012)
- 5000 metres – 16:46.1 (Getxo 2012)
- 10 kilometres – 33:52 (Madrid 2016)

Indoor

- 800 metres – 2:18.78 (A Coruña 2016)
- 1500 metres – 4:13.54 (Valencia 2017)
- 3000 metres – 8:55.95 (Valencia 2022)
