= Athletics at the 2017 Summer Universiade – Women's 1500 metres =

The women's 1500 metres event at the 2017 Summer Universiade was held on 26 and 28 August at the Taipei Municipal Stadium.

== Medalists ==
Gold	Silver	Bronze
Amela Terzić; Serbia	Docus Ajok; Uganda	Kristiina Maki; Czech Republic

== Results ==
=== Heats ===
Qualification: First 4 in each heat (Q) and next 4 fastest (q) qualified for the semifinals.

Rank	Heat	Name	Nationality	Time	Notes
1	2	Natalia Evangelidou	Cyprus	4:18.49	Q
2	2	Melissa Courtney	Great Britain	4:18.68	Q
3	2	Diana Sujew	Germany	4:18.88	Q
4	1	Docus Ajok	Uganda	4:19.21	Q, PB
5	2	Martyna Galant	Poland	4:19.31	Q
6	1	Amela Terzić	Serbia	4:19.59	Q
7	1	Kristiina Maki	Czech Republic	4:19.86	Q
8	1	Claudia Bobocea	Romania	4:19.94	Q
9	1	Regan Yee	Canada	4:19.97	q
10	2	Sarah MacPherson	Canada	4:20.45	q
11	2	Stefanie Barmet	Switzerland	4:20.77	q
12	1	Charline Mathias	Luxembourg	4:22.63	q
13	1	July da Silva	Brazil	4:27.15	
14	2	Patricija Plazar	Slovenia	4:28.78	PB
15	1	Anuscha Nice	South Africa	4:29.24	
16	2	Vera Hoffmann	Luxembourg	4:32.18	
17	1	Kelly Nevolihhin	Estonia	4:33.46	SB
18	1	Dagmar Olsen	Denmark	4:35.57	
19	1	Dilyana Minkina	Bulgaria	4:39.36	
20	2	Maria Larsen	Denmark	4:40.09	
21	1	Jennifer Dunlap	United States	4:42.92	
22	2	Agnes Amuron	Uganda	4:47.97	
	2	Julie Mathisen	Norway	DNS	

=== Final ===
Rank	Name	Nationality	Time	Notes
1st place, gold medalist(s)	Amela Terzić	Serbia	4:19.18	
2nd place, silver medalist(s)	Docus Ajok	Uganda	4:19.48	
3rd place, bronze medalist(s)	Kristiina Maki	Czech Republic	4:20.65	
4	Martyna Galant	Poland	4:20.90	
5	Melissa Courtney	Great Britain	4:21.14	
6	Natalia Evangelidou	Cyprus	4:21.16	
7	Diana Sujew	Germany	4:21.72	
8	Charline Mathias	Luxembourg	4:22.38	
9	Regan Yee	Canada	4:22.65	
10	Sarah MacPherson	Canada	4:22.77	
11	Claudia Bobocea	Romania	4:22.85	
12	Stefanie Barmet	Switzerland	4:24.33	
