= Martyna Galant =

Polish middle-distance runner

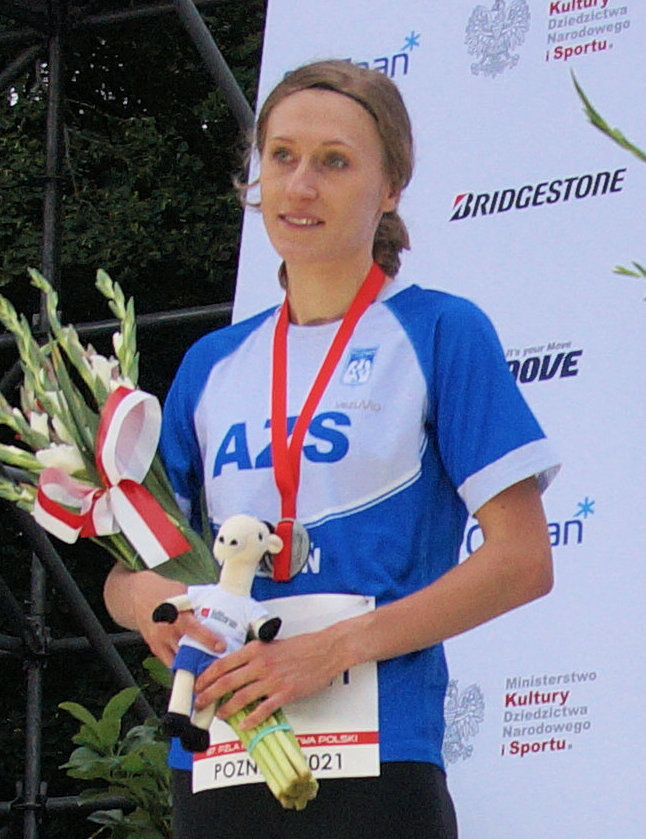
- Martyna Galant (2021)

Personal information
- Full name: Martyna Anna Galant
- Born: 26 January 1995 (age 31) Witkowo, Poland
- Education: University of Life Sciences in Poznań
- Height: 1.71 m (5 ft 7 in)
- Weight: 56 kg (123 lb)

Sport
- Sport: Athletics
- Event: 1500 metres
- Club: MKS Gniezno (2009–2015); OŚ AZS Poznań (2015-)
- Coached by: Paweł Piniarski (-2015); Ryszard Ostrowski (2015-)
Medal record
Women's athletics
Representing Poland
European Athletics U23 Championships
Bronze medal – third place	2017 Bydgoszcz	1500 m

Martyna Galant (born 26 January 1995) is a Polish middle-distance runner specialising in the 1500 metres. She won a bronze medal at the 2017 European U23 Championships.

== International competitions ==
Year	Competition	Venue	Position	Event	Notes
Representing Poland
2017	World Relays	Nassau, Bahamas	4th	4 × 800 m relay	8:24.71
2017	European U23 Championships	Bydgoszcz, Poland	3rd	1500 m	4:17.91
2017	Universiade	Taipei, Taiwan	4th	1500 m	4:20.90
2017	DécaNation	Angers, France	2nd	2000 m	5:50.54
2021	European Indoor Championships	Toruń, Poland	9th (h)	1500 m	4:12.08
2021	Olympic Games	Tokyo, Japan	23rd (sf)	1500 m	4:06.01
2024	World Indoor Championships	Glasgow, United Kingdom	20th (h)	1500 m	4:15.57
2024	European Championships	Rome, Italy	23rd (h)	1500 m	4:15.31

== Personal bests ==
Outdoor

- 800 metres – 2:02.97 (Białystok 2017)
- 1000 metres – 2:41.87 (Sopot 2017)
- 1500 metres – 4:08.81 (Bydgoszcz 2017)
- 2000 metres – 5:50.54 (Angers 2017)

Indoor

- 800 metres – 2:03.47 (Toruń 2017)
