= Víctor Ruiz (athlete) =

Spanish runner

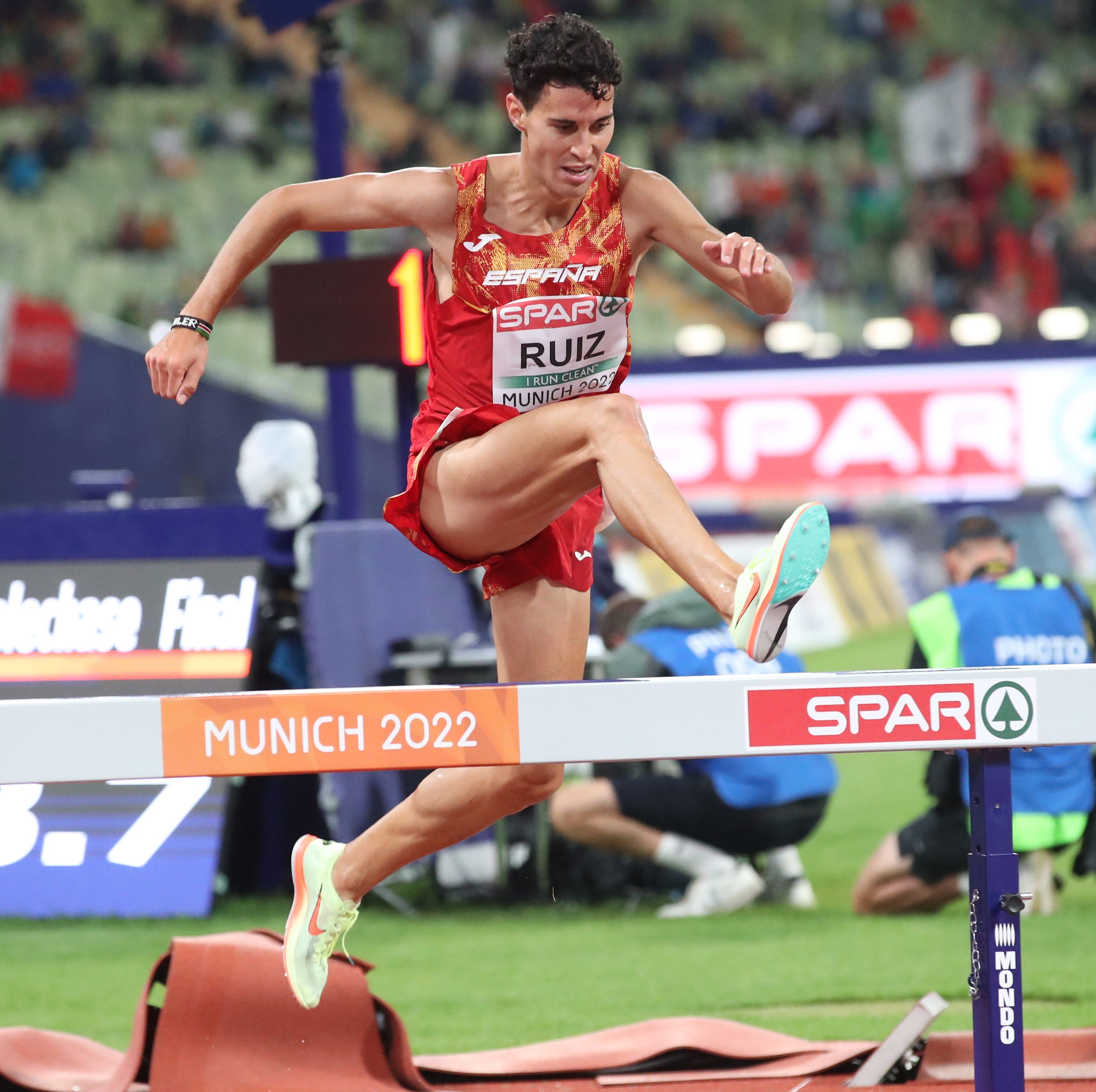
- Ruiz in Munich, 2022

Personal information
- Full name: Víctor Ruíz Orden
- Born: 24 June 1993 (age 33) Utiel, Spain

Sport
- Sport: Athletics, cross country running
- Club: Playas de Castellón

Víctor Ruiz Orden (born 24 June 1993) is a Spanish middle- and long-distance runner. He's won two medals in the European Cross Country Championships, in the mixed relay event.

== Personal best ==
Outdoors

- 1500 Metres: 3:37.86 (Castellón, 2022)
- 3000 Metres Steeplechase: 8:16.42 (Huelva, 2022)

Indoors

- 1500 Metres: 3:42.75 (Sabadell, 2019)
- 3000 Metres: 8:05.60 (Valencia, 2018)

== International competitions ==
Year	Competition	Venue	Position	Event	Notes
Representing Spain
2017	European Cross Country Championships	Šamorín, Slovakia	3rd	4 x 1,5 km mixed relay	18:26
2018	European Cross Country Championships	Tilburg, Netherlands	1st	4 x 1,5 km mixed relay	16:10
2019	World Cross Country Championships	Aarhus, Denmark	6th	4 x 2 km mixed relay	27:47
2021	European Cross Country Championships	Dublin, Ireland	5th	4 x 1,5 km mixed relay	18:13
2022	World Championships	Eugene, United States	30th (h)	3000 m steeplechase	8:33.42
2022	European Championships	Munich, Germany	13th	3000 m steeplechase	8:37.24
2023	World Championships	Budapest, Hungary	11th (h)	3000 m steeplechase	8:20.54
