= Rosa Flanagan =

New Zealander athlete

Personal information
- Born: 28 February 1996 (age 30)
- Education: Christchurch Polytechnic Institute of Technology

Sport
- Country: New Zealand
- Sport: Athletics
- Event: 3000 metres steeplechase
- Club: University of Canterbury Athletic Club
- Coached by: Maria Hassan

Rosa Juliet Flanagan (born 28 February 1996) is a New Zealand runner competing in the 3000 metres steeplechase. She represented her country at the 2015 World Championships in Beijing without qualifying for the final.

== Competition record ==
Year	Competition	Venue	Position	Event	Notes
Representing New Zealand
2013	World Youth Championships	Donetsk, Ukraine	20th (h)	1500 m	Youth
2014	World Junior Championships	Eugene, United States	7th	3000 m s'chase	10:04.01
2015	Universiade	Gwangju, South Korea	5th	3000 m s'chase	9:55.05
2015	World Championships	Beijing, China	37th (h)	3000 m s'chase	10:00.71

== Personal bests ==
Outdoor

- 1500 metres – 4:14.19 (Wellington 2015)
- One mile – 4:38.32 (Burnaby 2014)
- 3000 metres – 9:07.85 (Wellington 2015)
- 5000 metres – 15:52.10 (Auckland 2015)
- 3000 metres steeplechase – 9:41.42 (Melbourne 2015)
