= Ciara Mageean =

Irish athlete (1992–2026)

Ciara Mageean OLY
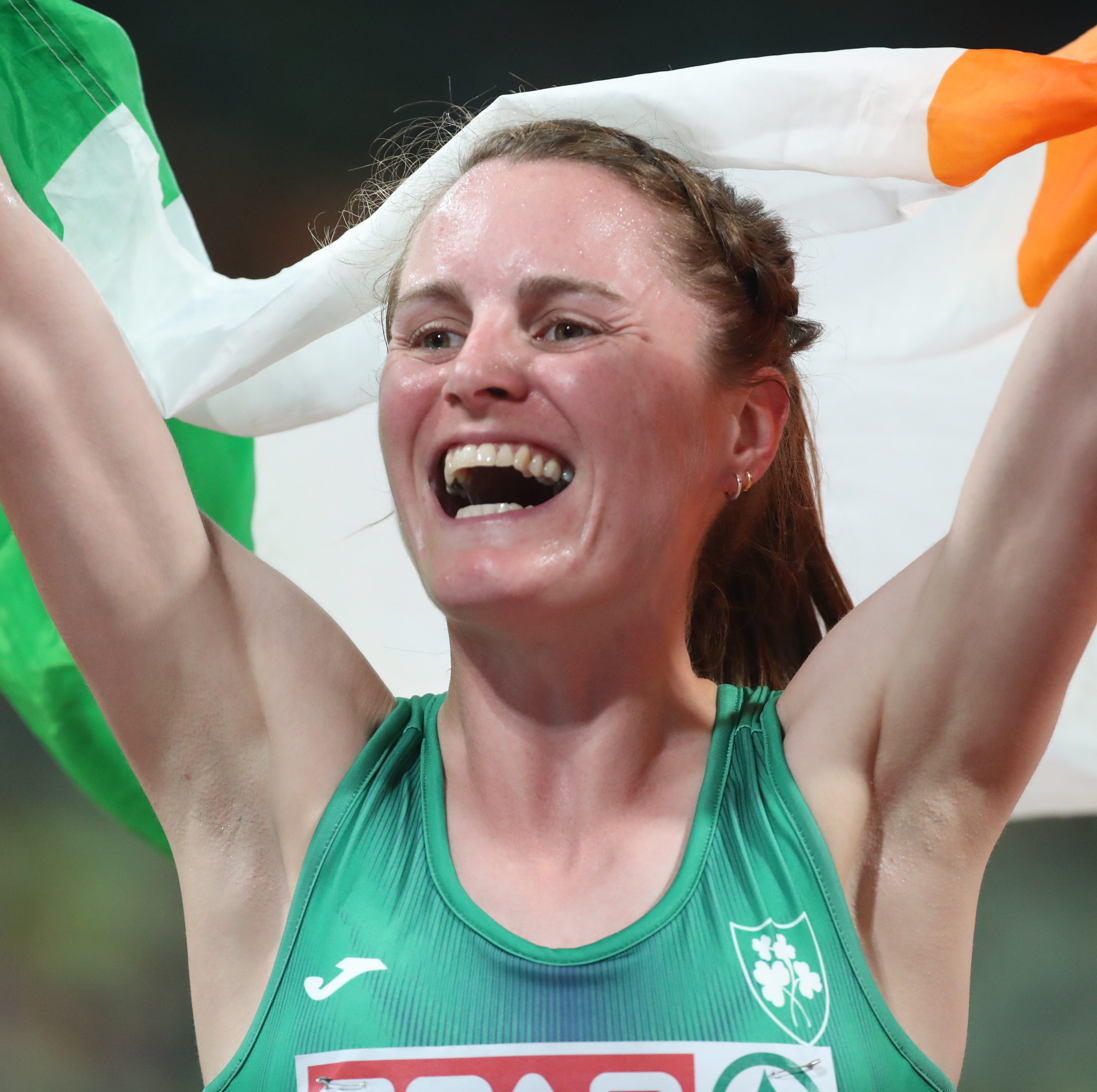
- Mageean in 2022

Personal information
- Born: 12 March 1992 Portaferry, County Down, Northern Ireland
- Died: 1 November 2026 (aged 34) Belfast, Northern Ireland
- Height: 170 cm (5 ft 7 in)
- Weight: 55 kg (121 lb)
- Spouse: Thomas Moran (m. 2026)

Sport
- Country: Ireland; Northern Ireland
- Sport: Athletics
- Event: Middle-distance running
- Coached by: Helen Clitheroe (2022–2024); Steve Vernon (2017–2021); Jerry Kiernan (–2017)

Achievements and titles
- Personal bests: 800 m: 1:58.51 NR (Manchester 2024); 1000 m: 2:31.06 NR (Monaco 2020); 1500 m: 3:55.87 NR (Brussels 2023); Mile: 4:14.58 NR (Monaco 2023); Indoors; 1500 m: 4:06.42i (Boston 2020); Mile: 4:28.31i NR (Boston 2019)
Medal record
Women's athletics
Representing Ireland
European Championships
Gold medal – first place	2024 Rome	1500 m
Silver medal – second place	2022 Munich	1500 m
Bronze medal – third place	2016 Amsterdam	1500 m
European Indoor Championships
Bronze medal – third place	2019 Glasgow	1500 m
World Junior Championships
Silver medal – second place	2010 Moncton	1500 m
European Junior Championships
Silver medal – second place	2011 Tallinn	1500 m
World Youth Championships
Silver medal – second place	2009 Brixen	800 m
European Youth Olympic Festival
Gold medal – first place	2009 Tampere	1500 m
Representing Northern Ireland
Commonwealth Games
Silver medal – second place	2022 Birmingham	1500 m
Commonwealth Youth Games
Bronze medal – third place	2008 Pune	1500 m

Ciara Mageean (/ˈkɪərə məˈɡiːən/ KEER-ə mə-GHEE-ən; 12 March 1992 – 1 November 2026) was an Irish middle-distance runner. She specialised in the 1500 metres. Mageean won the gold medal in the 2024 European Athletics Championships, and became the first individual Irish European champion since Sonia O'Sullivan and the first Northern Irish athlete to claim a major title since Mary Peters in 1972.

Mageean was a four-time European Athletics Championship medallist at the event, having also won bronze in 2016, silver in 2022 outdoors and bronze in 2019 indoors. Mageean also won silver at the 2022 Commonwealth Games. She won three silver medals at World and European level in the U-18 and U-20 age groups. She represented Ireland at both the 2016 Rio Olympics and 2020 Tokyo Olympics. She held four Irish records and was a multiple-time national champion.

== Career ==
Mageean won silver medals at the 2009 World Youth (800 metres) and 2010 World Junior (1500 metres) Championships. She added the 1500 m silver from the 2011 European Junior Championships. Her first senior international competition saw her finish tenth in the 1500 m at the 2010 Commonwealth Games in Delhi, while representing Northern Ireland.

Mageean competed in the 1500 m event at the 2016 European Athletics Championships, winning the bronze medal. Mageean became Irish indoor record holder for the 1,500 m and the mile that season. She qualified to represent Ireland at the 2016 Summer Olympics in Rio de Janeiro, where she reached the semi-finals. Mageean was coached by former Irish athlete and friend Jerry Kiernan, who she credited with her recovery after serious ankle injuries.

In 2017, Mageean moved to Manchester to work with Team New Balance, initially coached by Steve Vernon.

Mageean placed fourth in the 1500 m at the 2018 European Championships in Berlin.

On 3 March 2019, Mageean won the bronze medal in the event at the 2019 European Athletics Indoor Championships in Glasgow. At the World Championships held in Doha in October, she finished 10th in the final of her specialist event in a personal best time of 4:00.15. She placed twentieth in the senior race at the European Cross Country Championships in December.

In Bern, Switzerland, on 24 July 2020, Mageean became the first Irish woman to run sub-two minutes for the 800 m, adding to her indoor mile and 1500 m national records. In August, she set an Irish record in the 1000 m at the Diamond League meet in Monaco, breaking by more than three seconds Sonia O'Sullivan's 27-year-old record and moving into the top 10 on the world all-time list.

Mageean tore her calf before the delayed 2020 Summer Olympics held in Tokyo in 2021 and was eliminated in the heats of the 1500 m event.

Mageean had a successful 2022 season in which she was coached by Helen Clitheroe with the Manchester-based New Balance team. Mageean chose to skip the World Championships in Eugene, Oregon in July after contracting COVID-19 the previous month, and focused on the 2022 Commonwealth Games in Birmingham and the 2022 European Athletics Championships held in Munich in August. She won the silver medal in the 1500 m at both competitions, in each case finishing second to Scottish athlete Laura Muir. On 2 September, the 30-year-old earned her first Diamond League victory, winning her specialist event at the Brussels' Memorial Van Damme ahead of Muir. Mageean broke the four-minute barrier for the first time, and Sonia O'Sullivan's Irish record set in 1995, by more than two seconds. She achieved a personal best of 3:56.63, as her previous fastest time was 4:00.15, set in the 2019 World Championships final in Qatar. Six days later, she came second in a tactical race at the Zürich Diamond League final, finishing only behind two-time Olympic and World champion Faith Kipyegon.

On 27 May 2023, Mageean regained her Irish 800 m record, running a time of 1:59.27 at the British Milers Club Grand Prix to finish behind Abbey Caldwell and break Louise Shanahan's previous Irish record of 1:59.42. She broke Sonia O'Sullivan's 29-year old record Irish mile record at the Monaco Diamond League on 21 July, running 4:14.58 to finish second behind Faith Kipyegon and run the fifth-fastest time in history at the time. In August of the same year, she finished fourth in the final of the World Championships 1500 m. At the Brussels Diamond League on 8 September, Mageean broke her own Irish 1500 m record by running a time of 3:55.87 to finish second behind Muir. On 23 December, Mageean became the Parkrun female record holder with a time of 15:13 set in Victoria Park, Belfast.

Mageean improved her Irish 800 m record to 1:58.51 in Manchester on 25 May 2024. Three days later, she won at the Golden Spike Ostrava, running a time of 4:01.98, to finish ahead of her Irish compatriot Sarah Healy. On 9 June, Mageean won the gold medal in the 1500 metres at the 2024 European Athletics Championships. She was forced to withdraw from the 2024 Summer Olympics due to an Achilles injury.

== Personal life and death ==
She was awarded a UCD Ad Astra Elite Athlete Scholarship and graduated from University College Dublin with a BSc in Physiotherapy in 2017.

On 4 July 2025, Mageean announced that she had been diagnosed with cancer and had begun treatment. She said that she was focusing on her recovery and requested privacy during the process. In June 2026, Mageean disclosed that the diagnosis was stage 4 bowel cancer with a likely terminal prognosis.

She married her partner, Thomas Moran, at Belfast City Hall on 12 October 2026.

Mageean died at Belfast's Marie Curie Hospice on 1 November 2026, aged 34. Her funeral took place on 3 November at St Patrick's Church in Portaferry, and she was buried in the adjoining cemetery.

=== Tributes ===
Athletics Ireland described Mageean as a "much-loved and inspirational figure", while swimmer Danielle Hill said that her "legacy ... will never die". Northern Ireland's First Minister Michelle O'Neill said Mageean "will be remembered for her warmth, courage and tremendous strength of character", and deputy First Minister Emma Little-Pengelly referred to her as "an inspiration to many". Lady Mary Peters called Mageean a "lovely lady" and said she was "inspirational to the next generation". Mageean's death attracted many tributes from her fellow athletes including Jessica Hull, Faith Kipyegon, Sophie O'Sullivan and Phily Bowden.

== Statistics ==
=== Personal bests ===
All information from World Athletics profile.

- 800 metres – 1:58.51 (Manchester 2024) NR
- 1000 metres – 2:31.06 (Monaco 2020) NR
- 1500 metres – 3:55.87 (Brussels 2023) NR
  - 1500 metres indoor – 4:06.42 (Boston, MA 2020) NR
- One mile – 4:14.58 (Monaco 2023) NR
  - One mile indoor – 4:28.31 (Boston, MA 2019) NR
  - 3000 metres indoor – 8:47.23 (Manchester 2022)

=== National titles and circuit wins ===
- Irish Athletics Championships
  - 800 metres: 2015, 2017, 2018, 2019
  - 1500 metres: 2014, 2016, 2018
- Irish Indoor Athletics Championships
  - 800 metres: 2016
  - 3000 metres: 2017, 2019
- Diamond League
  - 2022 (1500 m): Brussels Memorial Van Damme (NR)

=== International competitions ===
All information from World Athletics profile.

Representing Ireland / Northern Ireland
Year	Competition	Venue	Position	Event	Result
2008	World Junior Championships	Bydgoszcz, Poland	10th	1500 m	4:26.87
2008	Commonwealth Youth Games	Pune, India	5th	800 m	2:08.74
2008	Commonwealth Youth Games	Pune, India	3rd	1500 m	4:22.53
2008	European Cross Country Championships	Brussels, Belgium	17th	XC 4.0 km U20	14:19
2008	European Cross Country Championships	Brussels, Belgium	4th	U20 team	77 pts
2009	World Youth Championships	Brixen, Italy	2nd	800 m	2:03.07 PB
2009	European Youth Olympic Festival	Tampere, Finland	1st	1500 m	4:15.46
2009	European Cross Country Championships	Dublin, Ireland	9th	XC 4.039 km U20	14:40
2010	World Junior Championships	Moncton, Canada	2nd	1500 m	4:09.51 NU20R
2010	Commonwealth Games	New Delhi, India	10th	1500 m	4:10.85
2010	European Cross Country Championships	Albufeira, Portugal	7th	XC 3.97 km U20	13:16
2011	European Team Championships First League	İzmir, Turkey	4th	1500 m	4:27.20
2011	European Junior Championships	Tallinn, Estonia	2nd	1500 m	4:16.82 SB
2012	European Championships	Helsinki, Finland	16th (sf)	1500 m	4:19.23
2016	European Championships	Amsterdam, Netherlands	3rd	1500 m	4:33.78
2016	Olympic Games	Rio de Janeiro, Brazil	17th (sf)	1500 m	4:08.07
2016	European Cross Country Championships	Chia, Italy	31st	XC 7.97 km	26:55
2017	European Indoor Championships	Belgrade, Serbia	– (f)	1500 m	DNF
2017	World Championships	London, United Kingdom	34th (h)	1500 m	4:10.60
2018	World Indoor Championships	Birmingham, United Kingdom	18th (h)	1500 m	4:11.81
2018	Commonwealth Games	Gold Coast, Australia	20th (h)	800 m	2:03.30
2018	Commonwealth Games	Gold Coast, Australia	13th	1500 m	4:07.41
2018	European Championships	Berlin, Germany	4th	1500 m	4:04.63
2018	European Cross Country Championships	Tilburg, Netherlands	43rd	XC 8.3 km	28:08
2019	European Indoor Championships	Glasgow, United Kingdom	3rd	1500 m	4:09.43
2019	World Championships	Doha, Qatar	10th	1500 m	4:00.15 PB
2021	Olympic Games	Tokyo, Tokyo	27th (h)	1500 m	4:07.29
2021	European Cross Country Championships	Dublin, Ireland	4th	Mixed relay	18:06
2022	Commonwealth Games	Birmingham, United Kingdom	2nd	1500 m	4:04.14 SB
2022	European Championships	Munich, Germany	2nd	1500 m	4:02.56 SB
2023	World Championships	Budapest, Hungary	4th	1500 m	3:56:61 PB NR
2024	European Championships	Rome, Italy	1st	1500 m	4:04.66

== Recognition ==
- Irish National Athletics Awards
  - 2022: Athlete of the Year, Track & Field Athlete of the Year
- BBC
  - 2023: Northern Ireland Sports Personality of the Year
