= Daryia Barysevich =

Belarusian middle-distance runner (born 1990)

Personal information
- Born: 27 May 1990 (age 36) Minsk, Belarus SSR

Sport
- Sport: Athletics
- Event: 1500 metres
- Club: Dynama
- Coached by: Zbigniew Król

Daryia Siarheyeuna Barysevich (Belarusian: Дар'я Сяргееўна Барысевіч, Russian: Дарья Борисевич; born 27 May 1990) is a Belarusian middle-distance runner specialising in the 1500 metres. She twice reached the final at the European Indoor Championships, in 2017 and 2019. She also finished eighth at the 2018 European Championships.

In 2019, she won the silver medal in the team event at the 2019 European Games held in Minsk, Belarus.

== International competitions ==
Year	Competition	Venue	Position	Event	Notes
Representing Belarus
2007	European Youth Olympic Festival	Belgrade, Serbia	–	800 m	DNF
2007	European Youth Olympic Festival	Belgrade, Serbia	4th	1500 m	4:31.93
2016	European Championships	Amsterdam, Netherlands	14th (h)	1500 m	4:14.06
2017	European Indoor Championships	Belgrade, Serbia	7th	1500 m	4:13.81
2017	World Relays	Nassau, Bahamas	2nd	4 × 800 m relay	8:20.07
2018	European Championships	Berlin, Germany	28th (h)	800 m	2:04.65
2018	European Championships	Berlin, Germany	8th	1500 m	4:07.52
2019	European Indoor Championships	Glasgow, United Kingdom	5th	1500 m	4:11.92
2019	World Championships	Doha, Qatar	21st (sf)	1500 m	4:17.04
2021	European Indoor Championships	Toruń, Poland	7th	1500 m	4:22.98

== Personal bests ==
Outdoor

- 800 metres – 2:01.93 (Heusden-Zolder 2016)
- 1000 metres – 2:39.19 (Sopot 2016)
- 1500 metres – 4:06.75 (Tübingen 2018)
- One mile – 4:30.86 (Rovereto 2016) NR

Indoor

- 800 metres – 2:03.73 (Mogilyov 2017)
- 1000 metres – 2:38.19 (Madrid 2017)
- 1500 metres – 4:08.31 (Glasgow 2019)
