= Zoe Buckman =

Australian runner

Personal information
- Nationality: Australian
- Born: 21 December 1988 (age 37) Grafton, New South Wales, Australia
- Height: 168 cm (66 in) (2012)
- Weight: 50 kg (110 lb) (2012)

Sport
- Country: Australia
- Sport: Athletics
- Events: 400 metres 800 metres 1500 metres 5000 metres
- College team: University of Oregon
- Turned pro: 2011
- Coached by: Nic Bideau

Achievements and titles
- Personal best: 1500 meter: 4:03.22

Zoe Buckman (born 21 December 1988) is an Australian runner who has competed nationally and internationally in the 400 metre, 800 metre, 1,500 metre and 5,000 metre events. She ran for the University of Oregon. She has also competed at the Junior World Championships, the Australian National Championships, the 2012 Summer Olympics (representing Australia), and the 2013 IAAF World Athletics Championships where she was a finalist in the Women's 1500 metres, the 2016 Olympics, the 2017 World Championships and 2018 Commonwealth Games.

== Personal ==
Zoe Buckman was born on 21 December 1988 in Grafton, New South Wales. She attended Canberra Girls' Grammar School. and went to the University of Oregon from 2006 to 2011 where she majored in psychology.

== Athletics ==
Zoe Buckman has run in the 400 metres, 800 metres, 1,500 metres and 5,000 metres events. Her personal best in the 400 metres is 54.62 seconds set in Canberra on 28 March 2004. Her personal best in the 800 metres is 2:01.60 seconds set in Lignano Sabbiadoro on 16 July 2013. Her personal best in the 1,500 metres is 4:03.22 seconds set on 27 August 2016, in Paris, France. She is coached by Nic Bideau.

Zoe Buckman competed at the Australian Championships in 2005 in the under-20 category. She finished second in the 400 metre event and first in the 800 metre event. She competed in the same age category again in 2006, finishing first in the 800 metre event and second in the 1500 metre event. In 2007, she competed in the under-20 category finishing first in the 800 metres and third in the 1500 metres event. In 2007, she also competed in the open age category, finishing third in the 800 metre event. In 2010, she competed in the open age category at the Australian Championships in the 5000 metres, where she finished second. In 2012, she competed in the 800 metre event where she also finished second.

Zoe Buckman competed at the World Junior Championships in 2004, where her 4 × 400 m team finished fifth in the heats. She competed at the 2006 event, finishing 4th in the 800 metre semi-final and eleventh in the 1500 metre final.

Zoe Buckman ran track for the University of Oregon from 2006/2007 to 2010/2011.

Zoe Buckman represented Australia at the 2012 Summer Olympics in the 1500 metre event. She was one of ten University of Oregon alumni to compete at the Games. She was eliminated in a semi-final after running a Personal Best time.

In 2013, Zoe Buckman qualified fastest for the 1500 metre final at the World Championships in Moscow, Russia with a semi-final win in a Personal Best of 4:04.8 seconds. She finished fourth in the final in 4:05.77.

She also represented Athletics Australia at the 2014 Commonwealth Games, the 2017 World Championships, the 2018 Commonwealth Games, and at the World Athletics Relays Championships in 2014 and 2017 where she won three bronze medals and, in 2014, set an Oceania Record in both the 4 x 800 metres and 4 x 1500 metres relays.

Zoe Buckman was a three times national 1500m champion: in 2011, 2013 and 2014.
