= Regan Yee =

Canadian steeplechaser

Personal information
- Nationality: Canadian
- Born: 4 July 1995 (age 31) South Hazelton, British Columbia, Canada
- Education: Trinity Western University '18
- Employer: Under Armour
- Height: 5 ft 5 in (165 cm)

Sport
- Sport: Track and field
- Event: 3000 m steeplechase
- University team: Trinity Western Spartans
- Club: Under Armour Dark Sky Distance

Achievements and titles
- Personal bests: 1500 m: 4:08.92 (Portland 2022); 3000 m steeplechase: 9:24.82 (Langley 2023); 5000 m: 15:01.84 (Seattle 2024); Indoor; Mile: 4:24.95 (Boston 2024); 3000 m: 8:38.94 (Boston 2024); 5000 m: 15:18.93 (Boston 2023)
Medal record
Women's track and field
Representing Canada
NACAC U23 Championships
Gold medal – first place	2016 San Salvador	3000 m st.
Bronze medal – third place	2016 San Salvador	1500 m
NACAC Championships
Bronze medal – third place	2022 Freeport	3000 m st.
Bronze medal – third place	2025 Freeport	5000 m

Regan Yee (born 4 July 1995) is a Canadian athlete who specializes in the 3000 metres steeplechase. She has represented Canada at the 2019, 2022, and 2023 World Athletics Championships as well as at the 2020 Summer Olympics.

== International competitions ==
Year	Competition	Venue	Position	Event	Time	Notes
Representing the Canada
2013	Pan American U20 Championships	Medellín, Colombia	6th	3000 m steeplechase	11:13.61	
2014	World Junior Championships	Eugene, United States	21st	3000 m steeplechase	10:32.04	
2015	Universiade	Gwangju, South Korea	7th	3000 m steeplechase	10:06.23	
2016	NACAC U23 Championships	San Salvador, El Salvador	1st	3000 m steeplechase	10:38.79	
2016	NACAC U23 Championships	San Salvador, El Salvador	3rd	1500 m	4:19.16	
2017	Universiade	Taipei, Taiwan	9th	1500 m	4:22.65	
2019	World Cross Country Championships	Aarhus, Denmark	7th	10,000 m mixed gender relay	27:57	
2019	Pan American Games	Lima, Peru	5th	3000 m steeplechase	10:00.08	
2019	World Championships	Doha, Qatar	33rd (h)	3000 m steeplechase	9:48.56	
2021	Olympic Games	Tokyo, Japan	29th (h)	3000 m steeplechase	9:41.14	
2022	World Championships	Eugene, United States	30th (h)	3000 m steeplechase	9:36.22	
2022	NACAC Championships	Freeport, Bahamas	4th	1500 m	4:12.54	
2022	NACAC Championships	Freeport, Bahamas	3rd	3000 m steeplechase	9:54.92	
2023	World Championships	Budapest, Hungary	18th (h)	3000 m steeplechase	9:26.39	
2024	Olympic Games	Paris, France	29th (h)	3000 m steeplechase	9:27.81	
2025	NACAC Championships	Freeport, Bahamas	3rd	5000 m	15:39.56	
2025	World Championships	Tokyo, Japan	29th (h)	5000 m	15:12.30	
2026	World Road Running Championships	Copenhagen, Denmark	25th	5 km	15:44	
