= Athletics at the 2015 Summer Universiade – Women's 3000 metres steeplechase =

The women's 3000 metres steeplechase event at the 2015 Summer Universiade was held on 10 July at the Gwangju Universiade Main Stadium.

== Results ==
Rank	Name	Nationality	Time	Notes
1st place, gold medalist(s)	Yekaterina Sokolenko	Russia	9:25.77	UR
2nd place, silver medalist(s)	Natalya Vlasova	Russia	9:35.99	SB
3rd place, bronze medalist(s)	Özlem Kaya	Turkey	9:37.79	
4	Marisa Howard	United States	9:50.64	
5	Rosa Flanagan	New Zealand	9:55.05	
6	Maria Bernard	Canada	9:57.70	
7	Regan Yee	Canada	10:06.23	
8	Eva Krchová	Czech Republic	10:09.14	
9	Valeria Roffino	Italy	10:13.44	
10	Viktória Gyürkés	Hungary	10:17.46	
11	Sofie Gallein	Belgium	10:26.01	
12	Thembi Baloyi	South Africa	10:32.43	
13	Meriem Aiach	Morocco	11:04.09	PB
14	Faith Keitany	Kenya	11:10.09	
15	Wilyeska Suarez	Venezuela	11:14.60	PB
16	Līna Šulgina	Latvia	11:46.54	
	Elif Karabulut	Turkey	DNF	
