= Amela Terzić =

Serbian middle-distance runner

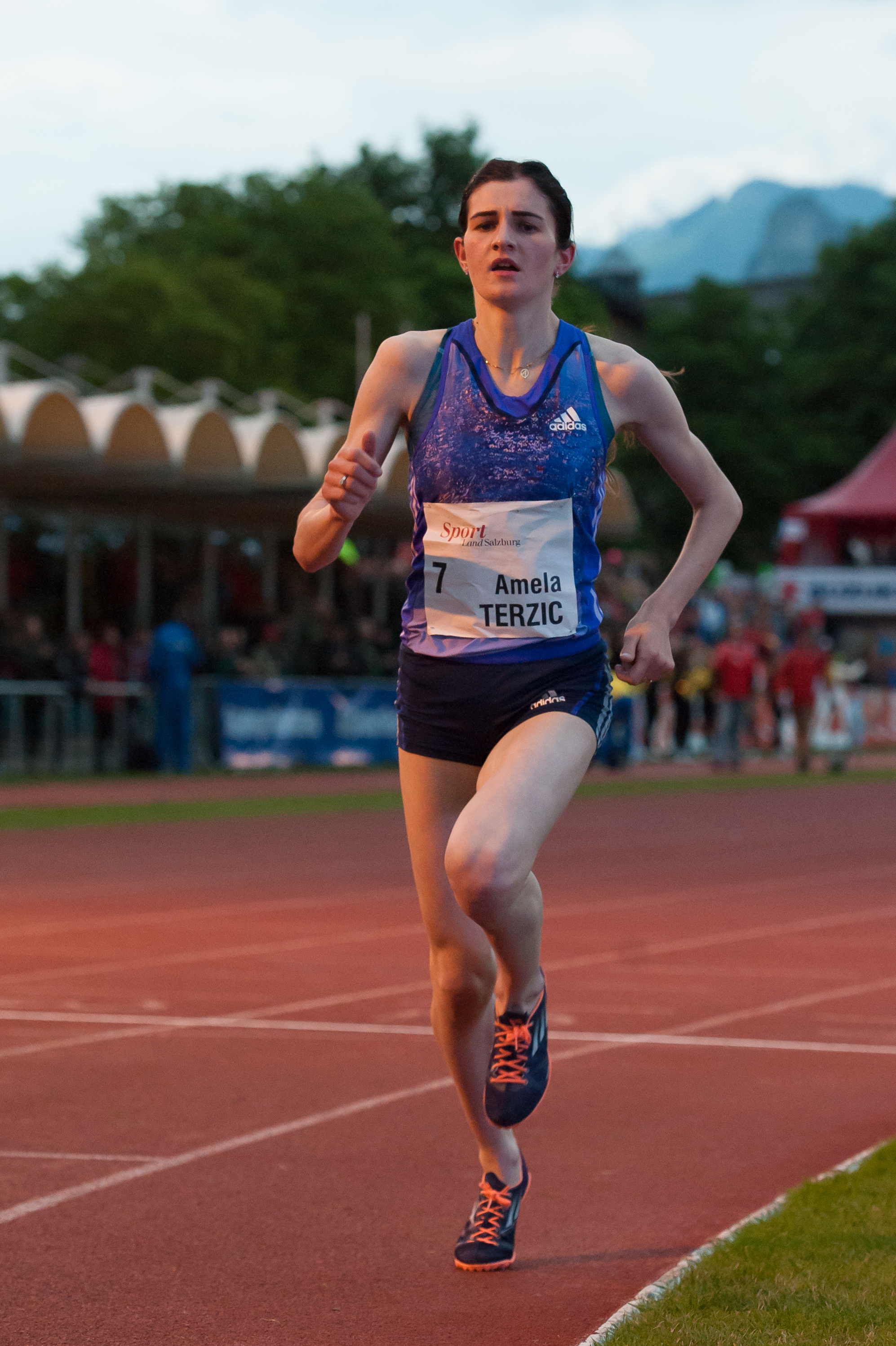
- Terzić at Salzburg in May 2015

Personal information
- Nationality: Serbian
- Born: 2 January 1993 (age 33) Priboj, Serbia, FR Yugoslavia
- Home town: Novi Pazar
- Height: 1.68 m (5 ft 6 in)
- Weight: 58 kg (128 lb)

Sport
- Sport: Track
- Events: 1500 metres, 3000 metres, cross country running

Achievements and titles
- Personal bests: 800m: 1:59.90; 1500m: 4:04.77; Mile: 4:33.46; 3000m: 8:57.20
Medal record
Representing Serbia
Universiade
| Gold medal – first place | 2017 Taipei | 1500 m |
European U23 Championships
| Gold medal – first place | 2013 Tampere | 1500 m |
| Gold medal – first place | 2015 Tallinn | 1500 m |
European Cross Country Championships
| Gold medal – first place | 2012 Szentendre | Junior race |
| Silver medal – second place | 2010 Albufeira | Junior race |
| Silver medal – second place | 2013 Belgrade | U23 race |
| Bronze medal – third place | 2011 Velenje | Junior race |
| Bronze medal – third place | 2015 Hyères | U23 race |
World Junior Championships
| Silver medal – second place | 2012 Barcelona | 1500 m |
European Junior Championships
| Gold medal – first place | 2011 Tallinn | 1500 m |
| Gold medal – first place | 2011 Tallinn | 3000 m |
World Youth Championships
| Bronze medal – third place | 2009 Brixen | 1500 m |
European Youth Olympic Festival
| Gold medal – first place | 2009 Tampere | 3000 m |
| Bronze medal – third place | 2009 Tampere | 1500 m |
- Updated on July 14, 2015

Amela Terzić (Serbian Cyrillic: Амела Терзић, born 2 January 1993) is a Serbian middle-distance runner. She won two gold medals at 2011 European Athletics Junior Championships in Tallinn and was the junior champion at the 2012 European Cross Country Championships. She has also been a medallist in the 1500 metres at the World Junior and World Youth Championships and a gold medalist at the 2013 European U23 Championship.

Terzić lives in Barakovac, Novi Pazar and is coached by Rifat Zilkić. She was awarded a golden badge for the best young athlete of Serbia in 2011 and 2012.

== Running career ==
Her first international appearances came in 2008 at the age of fifteen. That year she was second in the 800 m and third in the 1500 m at the Balkan Junior Athletics Championships. She established herself as a youth and junior athlete the following year: she was the Balkan junior champion in cross country and both middle-distance events, took bronze in the 1500 m at the 2009 World Youth Championships in Athletics, and was the champion in the 3000 metres at the European Youth Olympic Festival (where she also took 1500 m bronze). Further to this, she was a finalist in the 1500 m and 3000 m at the 2009 European Athletics Junior Championships and came twelfth in the junior section of the 2009 European Cross Country Championships.

Terzić began 2010 with a win at the Belikros cross country race in Serbia. On the track she was eighth in the 1500 m at the 2010 World Junior Championships in Athletics and won the 3000 m at the European junior clubs championship. He first major junior medal came in the form of a silver medal at the 2010 European Cross Country Championships, finishing three seconds behind winner Charlotte Purdue. Another win at the Belikros opened 2011 In her world debut on grass she came 32nd at the junior race of the 2011 IAAF World Cross Country Championships, which was among the best placings by a European. A 1500/3000 m double at the 2011 European Athletics Junior Championships confirmed her place among the top junior runners in the region. She won a third European medal of the season at the 2011 European Cross Country Championships, taking the bronze medal.

Terzić made her first impact in senior level athletics in the 2012 season. She won the silver medal at the 2012 World Junior Championships in Athletics with a Serbian national record time of 4:07.59 minutes for the 15000 m. A week later she took both the 1500 m and 3000 m titles at the Balkan Athletics Championships. She placed fourth in the 1500 at the Rieti Meeting and ran another national record in the non-standard 1000 m distance at the Athletics Bridge meet. In her final appearance in the junior category, she won the gold medal at the 2012 European Cross Country Championships. She celebrated the New Year by winning at the Silvesterlauf Peuerbach 5K road race, beating top marathon runner Irina Mikitenko.

In 2013 season she won a gold medal at the European U23 Championship in 1500m with a national record of 4:05.69 and debuted at the senior World Championship without reaching finals. In the same season she won her first cross-county medal as U23 athlete, silver at home at the European Cross Country Championships in Serbia.

In 2014, she competed for the first time in senior European Outdoor Championship and finished 12th in final.

== Personal bests ==
| Event | Time (min) | Date | Venue | Notes |
|---|---|---|---|---|
| 800 m | 1:59.90 | 20 June 2015 | Stara Zagora, Bulgaria | NR |
| 1000 m | 2:39.79 | 26 August 2012 | Dubnica nad Váhom, Slovakia | NR |
| 1500 m | 4:04.77 | 12 July 2015 | Tallinn, Estonia | NR |
| 2000 m | 5:55.62 | 17 June 2014 | Ostrava, Czech Republic | NR |
| 3000 m | 8:57.20 | 27 May 2015 | Salzburg, Austria | |

== International competitions ==
| Year | Competition | Venue | Position | Event | Notes |
Representing Serbia
| 2009 | World Youth Championships | Brixen, Italy | 3rd | 1500 m | 4:16.7 |
| 2009 | European Youth Olympic Festival | Tampere, Finland | 3rd | 1500 m | 4:22.46 |
| 2009 | European Youth Olympic Festival | Tampere, Finland | 1st | 3000 m | 9:22.44 |
| 2009 | European Junior Championships | Novi Sad, Serbia | 9th | 1500 m | 4:23.99 |
| 2009 | European Junior Championships | Novi Sad, Serbia | 6th | 3000 m | 9:22.44 |
| 2009 | European Cross Country Championships | Dublin, Ireland | 12th | Junior race | 14:42 |
2010
| 2010 | World Junior Championships | Moncton, Canada | 8th | 1500 m | 4:19.03 |
| 2010 | European Cross Country Championships | Albufeira, Portugal | 2nd | Junior race | 12:59 |
2011
| 2011 | World Cross Country Championships | Punta Umbría, Spain | 32nd | Junior race | 20:56 |
| 2011 | European Junior Championships | Tallinn, Estonia | 1st | 1500 m | 4:20.73 |
| 2011 | European Junior Championships | Tallinn, Estonia | 1st | 3000 m | 9:30.23 |
| 2011 | European Cross Country Championships | Velenje, Slovenia | 3rd | Junior race | 13:22 |
| 2012 | World Junior Championships | Barcelona, Spain | 2nd | 1500 m | 4:07.59 |
| 2012 | European Cross Country Championships | Szentendre, Hungary | 1st | Junior race | 13:29 |
| 2013 | European Team Championships — 2nd League | Kaunas, Lithuania | 3rd | 800 m | 2:04.67 |
| 2013 | European Team Championships — 2nd League | Kaunas, Lithuania | 1st | 1500 m | 4:26.73 |
| 2013 | European U23 Championships | Tampere, Finland | 1st | 1500 m | 4:05.69 |
| 2013 | World Championships | Moscow, Russia | 37th (h) | 1500 m | 4:27.89 |
| 2013 | European Cross Country Championships | Belgrade, Serbia | 2nd | U23 race | 19:46 |
| 2014 | European Team Championships — 2nd League | Riga, Latvia | 3rd | 800 m | 2:05.24 |
| 2014 | European Team Championships — 2nd League | Riga, Latvia | 1st | 1500 m | 4:28.99 |
| 2014 | European Team Championships — 2nd League | Riga, Latvia | 1st | 3000 m | 9:11.64 |
| 2014 | European Championships | Zürich, Switzerland | 12th | 1500 m | 4:19.11 |
| 2014 | European Cross Country Championships | Samokov, Bulgaria | 10th | U23 race | 23:04 |
| 2015 | European Indoor Championships | Prague, Czech Republic | 16th (h) | 3000 m | 9:17.73 |
| 2015 | European Team Championships — 2nd League | Stara Zagora, Bulgaria | 1st | 800 m | 1:59.90 |
| 2015 | European Team Championships — 2nd League | Stara Zagora, Bulgaria | 1st | 1500 m | 4:16.13 |
| 2015 | European U23 Championships | Tallinn, Estonia | 1st | 1500 m | 4:04.77 |
| 2015 | World Championships | Beijing, China | 15th (h) | 1500 m | 4:13.92 |
| 2015 | European Cross Country Championships | Hyères, France | 3rd | U23 race | 19:49 |
| 2016 | European Championships | Amsterdam, Netherlands | 12th | 1500 m | 4:37.70 |
| 2016 | Olympic Games | Rio de Janeiro, Brazil | 23rd (sf) | 800 m | 2:03.81 |
| 2016 | Olympic Games | Rio de Janeiro, Brazil | 34th (h) | 1500 m | 4:15.17 |
| 2017 | European Indoor Championships | Belgrade, Serbia | 8th | 1500 m | 4:25.15 |
| 2017 | World Championships | London, United Kingdom | 22nd (h) | 1500 m | 4:08.55 |
| 2017 | Universiade | Taipei, Taiwan | 17th (sf) | 800 m | 2:07.54 |
| 2017 | Universiade | Taipei, Taiwan | 1st | 1500 m | 4:19.18 |
| 2018 | Mediterranean Games | Tarragona, Spain | 9th (h) | 800 m | 2:08.38 |
| 2018 | Mediterranean Games | Tarragona, Spain | 7th | 1500 m | 4:19.13 |
| 2018 | European Championships | Berlin, Germany | 23rd (h) | 1500 m | 4:17.22 |
| 2019 | European Indoor Championships | Glasgow, United Kingdom | 9th | 1500 m | 4:24.20 |

Awards
| Preceded by Olivera and Nikolina Moldovan | The Best Young Athlete of Serbia; 2011 (with Uroš Kovačević), 2012 | Succeeded by Predrag Rajković |
