= 2017 European Athletics U23 Championships – Women's 1500 metres =

The women's 1500 metres event at the 2017 European Athletics U23 Championships was held in Bydgoszcz, Poland, at Zdzisław Krzyszkowiak Stadium on 14 and 16 July.

== Medalists ==
Gold	Konstanze Klosterhalfen; Germany
Silver	Sofia Ennaoui; Poland
Bronze	Martyna Galant; Poland

== Results ==
=== Heats ===
14 July

Qualification rule: First 4 (Q) and the next 4 fastest (q) qualified for the final.

Rank	Heat	Name	Nationality	Time	Notes
1	2	Konstanze Klosterhalfen	Germany	4:13.07	Q
2	2	Amy Griffiths	Great Britain	4:17.11	Q
3	1	Sofia Ennaoui	Poland	4:18.17	Q
4	2	Isabella Andersson	Sweden	4:19.66	Q
5	2	Vera Hoffmann	Luxembourg	4:19.89	Q
6	1	Martyna Galant	Poland	4:19.90	Q
7	2	Fatma Arık	Turkey	4:20.04	q, PB
8	1	Ingrid Halvorsen Folvik]	Norway	4:20.51	Q, SB
9	1	Linn Söderholm	Sweden	4:21.29	Q
10	2	Carla Masip	Spain	4:22.49	q
11	2	Giulia Aprile	Italy	4:22.57	q
12	1	Line Kalstrup Schulz	Denmark	4:23.41	q
13	2	Sylwia Indeka	Poland	4:24.30	
14	1	Anastasia-Panayiota Marinakou	Greece	4:25.80	
15	1	Martina Rodríguez	Spain	4:27.67	
16	1	Selina Ummel	Switzerland	4:28.23	
17	2	Dilyana Minkina	Bulgaria	4:29.47	SB

=== Final ===
16 July

Rank	Name	Nationality	Time	Notes
1st place, gold medalist(s)	Konstanze Klosterhalfen	Germany	4:10.30	
2nd place, silver medalist(s)	Sofia Ennaoui	Poland	4:13.54	
3rd place, bronze medalist(s)	Martyna Galant	Poland	4:17.91	
4	Linn Söderholm	Sweden	4:18.88	
5	Amy Griffiths	Great Britain	4:19.16	
6	Carla Masip	Spain	4:21.63	
7	Giulia Aprile	Italy	4:21.64	
8	Vera Hoffmann	Luxembourg	4:21.94	
9	Ingrid Halvorsen Folvik	Norway	4:22.70	
10	Line Kalstrup Schulz	Denmark	4:23.14	
11	Fatma Arık	Turkey	4:23.15	
12	Isabella Andersson	Sweden	4:28.38	
