= Athletics at the 2018 Commonwealth Games – Women's 1500 metres =

Women's 1500 metres at the 2018 Commonwealth Games
- Venue: Carrara Stadium
- Dates: 9 April (heats); 10 April (final)
- Competitors: 19 from 12 nations
- Winning time: 4:00.71 GR

Medalists
gold medal	Caster Semenya	South Africa
silver medal	Beatrice Chepkoech	Kenya
bronze medal	Melissa Courtney	Wales

The women's 1500 metres at the 2018 Commonwealth Games, as part of the athletics programme, took place in the Carrara Stadium on 9 and 10 April 2018.

Caster Semenya won the 1500 m Commonwealth Games title in a Games record and South African record time of 4:00.71 minutes. Her hyperandrogenic condition remained a point of controversy amongst her competitors, with Australian Brittany McGowan saying that it was "tough for a lot of women" to compare in performance.

== Records ==
Prior to this competition, the existing world and Games records were as follows:

World record	Genzebe Dibaba (ETH)	3:50.07	Fontvieille, Monaco	17 July 2015
Games record	Hellen Obiri (KEN)	4:04.43	Glasgow, Scotland	28 July 2014

== Schedule ==
The schedule was as follows:

Date	Time	Round
Monday 9 April 2018	19:25	First round
Tuesday 10 April 2018	22:04	Final

All times are Australian Eastern Standard Time (UTC+10)

== Results ==
=== First round ===
The first round consisted of two heats. The four fastest competitors per heat (plus four fastest losers) advanced to the final.

In addition, the track referee ruled that Zoe Buckman and Sarah McDonald were sufficiently impeded by Winny Chebet (who fell during the second heat) to merit being advanced to the final.

Heat 1

Rank	Order	Name	Result	Notes	Qual.
1	10	Caster Semenya (RSA)	4:05.86		Q
2	2	Georgia Griffith (AUS)	4:06.41	PB	Q
3	6	Mary Wangari Kuria (KEN)	4:06.58	SB	Q
4	1	Melissa Courtney (WAL)	4:06.63		Q
5	9	Eilish McColgan (SCO)	4:06.88		q
6	3	Ciara Mageean (NIR)	4:07.78		q
7	5	Katie Snowden (ENG)	4:08.00		q
8	7	Jessica Judd (ENG)	4:08.87		q
9	4	Beatha Nishimwe (RWA)	4:14.96	SB	
10	8	Mokulubete Makatisi (LES)	4:41.19		

Heat 2

Rank	Order	Name	Result	Notes	Qual.
1	7	Beatrice Chepkoech (KEN)	4:08.29		Q
2	5	Winnie Nanyondo (UGA)	4:08.49		Q
3	2	Linden Hall (AUS)	4:08.64		Q
4	8	Stephanie Twell (SCO)	4:08.66		Q
5	1	Sarah McDonald (ENG)	4:09.54	R 162.2a	q
6	6	Gabriela Stafford (CAN)	4:09.59		
7	4	Natalia Evangelidou (CYP)	4:10.98	NR	
8	9	Zoe Buckman (AUS)	4:11.78	R 162.2a	q
9	3	Winny Chebet (KEN)	4:20.67		

=== Final ===
The medals were determined in the final.

Rank	Order	Name	Result	Notes
1st place, gold medalist(s)	12	Caster Semenya (RSA)	4:00.71	GR, NR
2nd place, silver medalist(s)	8	Beatrice Chepkoech (KEN)	4:03.09	PB
3rd place, bronze medalist(s)	1	Melissa Courtney (WAL)	4:03.44	PB
4	7	Linden Hall (AUS)	4:03.67	SB
5	6	Georgia Griffith (AUS)	4:04.17	PB
6	14	Eilish McColgan (SCO)	4:04.30	
7	13	Stephanie Twell (SCO)	4:05.56	SB
8	2	Sarah McDonald (ENG)	4:05.77	
9	5	Mary Wangari Kuria (KEN)	4:05.88	SB
10	3	Winnie Nanyondo (UGA)	4:06.05	PB
11	9	Katie Snowden (ENG)	4:06.55	
12	11	Zoe Buckman (AUS)	4:06.76	
13	4	Ciara Mageean (NIR)	4:07.41	
14	10	Jessica Judd (ENG)	4:08.82	
