= Sofia Ennaoui =

Polish middle-distance runner

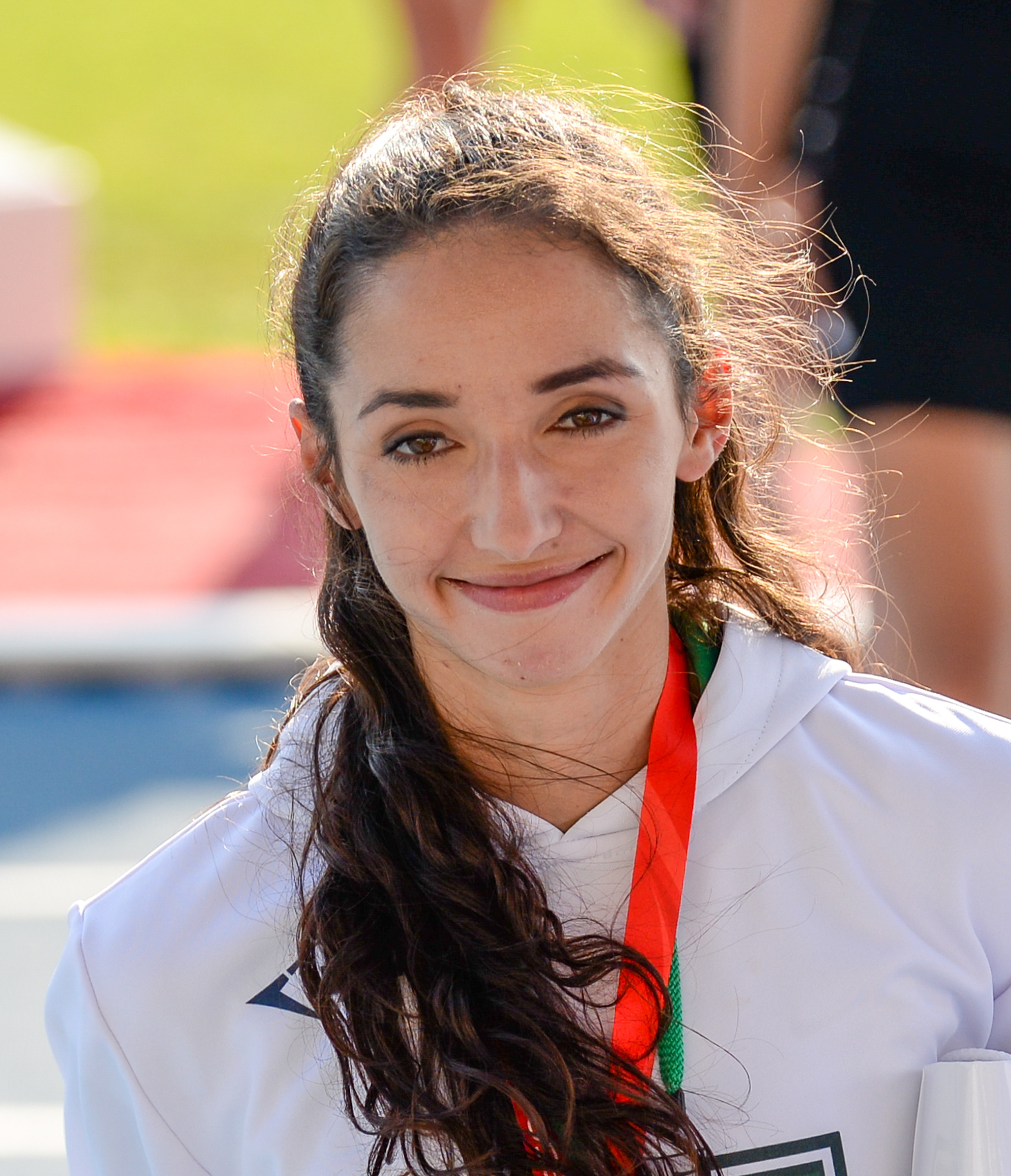
- Ennaoui in 2019

Personal information
- Nationality: Polish
- Born: 30 August 1995 (age 30) Ben Guerir, Morocco
- Education: WSB Merito University (Szczecin)
- Height: 1.58 m (5 ft 2 in)

Sport
- Country: Poland
- Sport: Athletics
- Event: 1500 metres
- Club: AZS UMCS Lublin (2019–); MKL Szczecin (2016–2019); LKS Lubusz Słubice (2010–2016)
- Coached by: Wojciech Szymaniak
Medal record
Women's athletics
Representing Poland
European Championships
Silver medal – second place	2018 Berlin	1500 m
Bronze medal – third place	2022 Munich	1500 m
European Indoor Championships
Silver medal – second place	2019 Glasgow	1500 m
Bronze medal – third place	2017 Belgrade	1500 m
Bronze medal – third place	2023 Istanbul	1500 m
European U23 Championships
Silver medal – second place	2015 Tallinn	1500 m
Silver medal – second place	2017 Bydgoszcz	1500 m
European Cross Country Championships
Gold medal – first place	2016 Chia	U23 race
Silver medal – second place	2013 Belgrade	U20 race

Sofia Ennaoui (born 30 August 1995) is a retired Polish middle-distance runner who specialised in the 1500 metres. She finished fifth in the event at the 2022 World Athletics Championships as the second non-African woman. Ennaoui won the silver medal at the 2018 European Championships, and a bronze at the 2022 European Championships. At the European Indoor Championships, she earned bronze in 2017, silver in 2019 and bronze in 2023. She took two individual age-group medals at the European Cross Country Championships.

She was the 2015 and 2017 European Under-23 Championships 1500 m silver medallist. Ennaoui represented her country at the 2016 Rio Olympics. She is the Polish record holder for the 1000 metres both indoors and out, and also holds national U20 record for the 3000 metres. She won 10 Polish titles (mostly over 1500 m).

== Personal life ==
Sofia Ennaoui was born to a Moroccan father and a Polish mother and moved to Poland at the age of 2. She is a soldier in the Polish Army; she went through the Polish military's basic training in 2019 which resulted in an injury and her absence from the 2019 World Championships in Doha.

Foot injury meant she was also unable to compete at the postponed 2020 Tokyo Olympics in 2021.

== Achievements ==
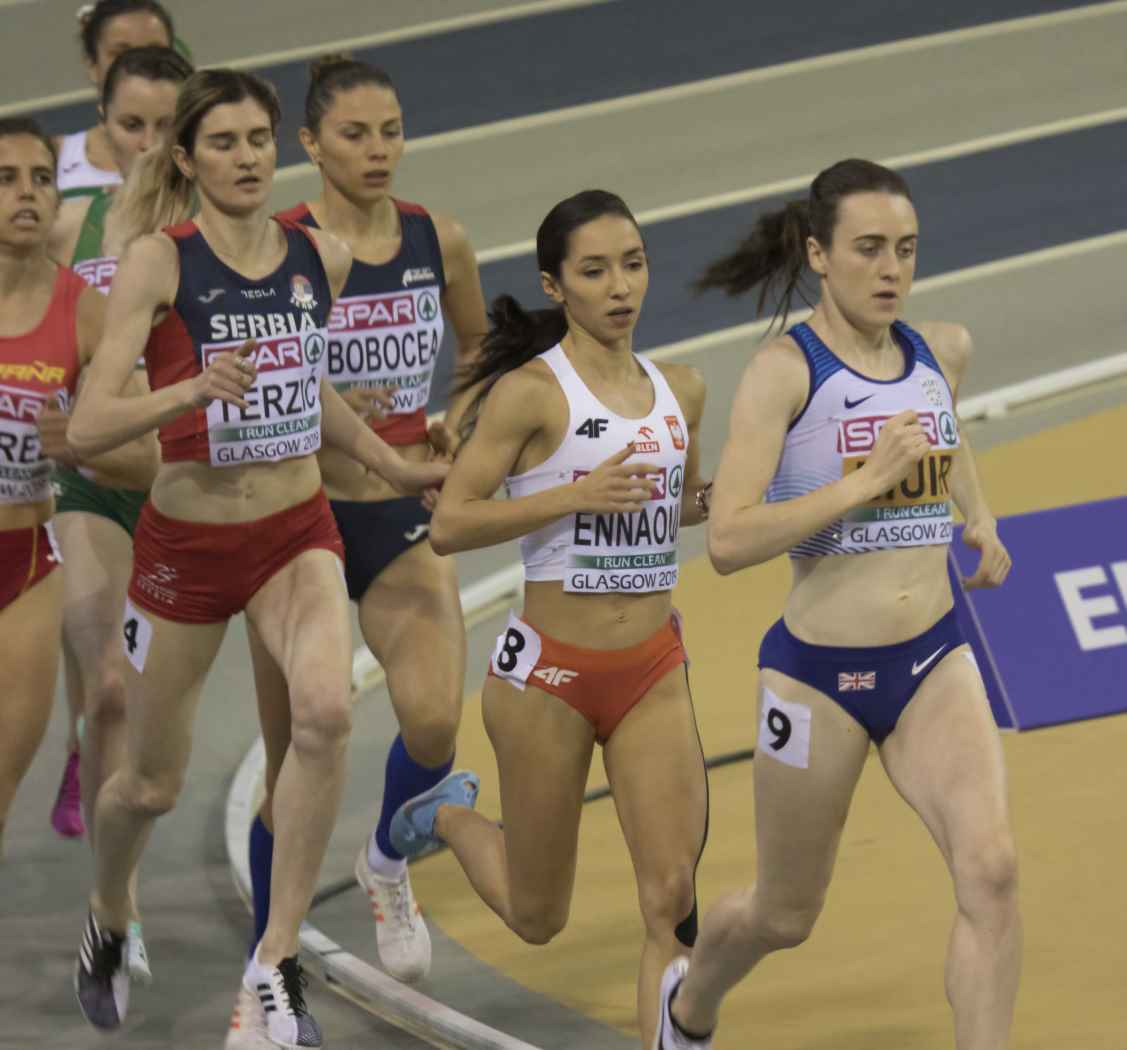
Sofia Ennaoui (second from the right behind Laura Muir) races the 1500 m at the 2019 European Indoor Championships in Glasgow, where she won silver behind only Muir.

=== International competitions ===
Representing Poland
Year	Competition	Venue	Position	Event	Notes
2011	World Youth Championships	Lille, France	33rd (h)	800 m	2:14.73
2012	World Junior Championships	Barcelona, Spain	10th	1500 m	4:15.23
2013	World Cross Country Championships	Bydgoszcz, Poland	26th	Junior race	19:45
2013	European Junior Championships	Rieti, Italy	2nd	1500 m	4:20.20
2013	European Cross Country Championships	Belgrade, Serbia	2nd	Junior race	13:16
2014	World Junior Championships	Eugene, OR, United States	5th	1500 m	4:13.06
2014	World Junior Championships	Eugene, OR, United States	–	3000 m	DNF
2015	European Indoor Championships	Prague, Czech Republic	6th	3000 m	8:56.77
2015	World Relays	Nassau, Bahamas	2nd	4 × 800 m relay	8:11.36 NR
2015	World Relays	Nassau, Bahamas	3rd	Medley relay	10:45.32 AR
2015	European Team Championships Super League	Cheboksary, Russia	1st	3000 m	9:20.39
2015	European U23 Championships	Tallinn, Estonia	2nd	1500 m	4:04.90
2015	World Championships	Beijing, China	18th (sf)	800 m	2:00.11
2015	World Championships	Beijing, China	17th (sf)	1500 m	4:16.70
2016	European Championships	Amsterdam, Netherlands	7th	1500 m	4:34.84
2016	Olympic Games	Rio de Janeiro, Brazil	10th	1500 m	4:14.72
2016	European Cross Country Championships	Chia, Italy	1st	U23 race	19:21
2017	European Indoor Championships	Belgrade, Serbia	3rd	1500 m	4:06.59
2017	European Team Championships Super League	Lille, France	1st	3000 m	9:01.24
2017	European U23 Championships	Bydgoszcz, Poland	2nd	1500 m	4:13.54
2017	World Championships	London, United Kingdom	13th (sf)	1500 m	4:05.80
2017	DécaNation	Angers, France	1st	800 m	2:05.72
2018	World Cup	London, United Kingdom	1st	1500 m	4:07.66
2018	European Championships	Berlin, Germany	2nd	1500 m	4:03:08
2018	Continental Cup	Ostrava, Czech Republic	7th	1500 m	4:22.56
2019	European Indoor Championships	Glasgow, United Kingdom	2nd	1500 m	4:09.30
2019	European Team Championships Super League	Bydgoszcz, Poland	1st	1500 m	4:08.37
2022	World Championships	Eugene, OR, United States	5th	1500 m	4:01.43 SB
2022	European Championships	Munich, Germany	3rd	1500 m	4:03.59
2023	European Indoor Championships	Istanbul, Turkey	3rd	1500 m	4:04.06 PB
2023	World Championships	Budapest, Hungary	36th (h)	1500 m	4:06.47
2024	European Championships	Rome, Italy	21st (h)	1500 m	4:13.71

=== Personal bests ===
- 800 metres – 1:58.98 (Chorzów 2022)
  - 800 metres indoor – 2:00.40 (Toruń 2019)
- 1000 metres – 2:32.30 (Monaco 2020) NR
  - 1000 metres indoor – 2:35.69 (Birmingham 2023) NR
- 1500 metres – 3:59.70 (Chorzów 2020)
  - 1500 metres indoor – 4:04.06 (Istanbul 2023)
- Mile – 4:23.34 (London 2018)
  - Mile indoor – 4:30.43 (Stockholm 2016)
- 3000 metres – 8:59.44 (Sotteville-lès-Rouen 2014) NU20R
  - 3000 metres indoor – 8:45.29 (Birmingham 2017)

=== National titles ===
- Polish Athletics Championships
  - 1500 metres: 2015, 2017, 2018, 2019, 2020, 2022
- Polish Indoor Athletics Championships
  - 1500 metres: 2015, 2018, 2019
  - 3000 metres: 2017
