= 2013 World Youth Championships in Athletics – Girls' 1500 metres =

Girls' 1500 metres at the 2013 World Youth Championships in Athletics
- Venue: RSC Olimpiyskiy
- Dates: 10 July (heats); 13 July (final)
- Competitors: 30
- Winning time: 4:14.25

Medalists
gold medal	Tigist Gashaw	Ethiopia
silver medal	Dawit Seyaum	Ethiopia
bronze medal	Alexa Efraimson	United States

The girls' 1500 metres at the 2013 World Youth Championships in Athletics was held on 10 and 13 July.

== Medalists ==
Gold	Silver	Bronze
Tigist Gashaw; Ethiopia	Dawit Seyaum; Ethiopia	Alexa Efraimson; United States

== Records ==
Prior to the competition, the following records were as follows.

World Youth Best	Zhang Ling (CHN)	3:54.52	Shanghai, China	18 October 1997
Championship Record	Faith Chepngetich Kipyegon (KEN)	4:09.48	Lille, France	9 July 2011
World Youth Leading	Mary Cain (USA)	4:04.62	Los Angeles, CA, United States	17 May 2013

== Heats ==
Qualification rule: first 4 of each heat (Q) plus the 4 fastest times (q) qualified.

=== Heat 1 ===
Rank	Name	Nationality	Time	Notes
1	Tigist Gashaw	Ethiopia	4:18.55	Q
2	Maki Izumida	Japan	4:20.60	Q, SB
3	Maria Dietz	Germany	4:20.68	Q
4	Bobby Clay	Great Britain	4:21.18	Q
5	Line Kalstrup Schulz	Denmark	4:23.16	q, PB
6	Carina Viljoen	South Africa	4:28.42	q, PB
7	Zheng Zhiling	China	4:28.57	q, PB
8	Anna Maxwell	United States	4:28.92	q
9	Antonina Ilchyk	Ukraine	4:29.04	
10	Silvia Salera	Italy	4:34.48	PB
11	Fatma Arik	Turkey	4:36.04	
12	Elisabeth Bergh	Norway	4:36.39	
13	Megan Rempel	Canada	4:40.56	
14	Lorena Gómez Espinoza	Mexico	4:46.31	
	Kidanu Teweldemed	Eritrea	DNS	

=== Heat 2 ===
Rank	Name	Nationality	Time	Notes
1	Dawit Seyaum	Ethiopia	4:14.40	Q, PB
2	Ivine Chepkemoi	Kenya	4:17.81	Q, PB
3	Alexa Efraimson	United States	4:23.27	Q
4	Lizerie Ferreira	South Africa	4:24.80	Q, PB
5	Mary Joy Mudyiravanji	Zimbabwe	4:29.80	PB
6	Sara Takahashi	Japan	4:30.29	
7	Xu Shuangshuang	China	4:30.68	
8	Federica Zenoni	Italy	4:33.51	
9	Rachael Zena Chebet	Uganda	4:34.27	
10	Rosa Flanagan	New Zealand	4:36.00	
11	Rima Chenah	Algeria	4:38.86	
12	Heather Jaros	Canada	4:45.21	
13	Nuran Satlimis	Turkey	4:47.22	
14	Karina Hernandez	Mexico	4:49.33	
	Weini Frezghi	Eritrea	DNS	

== Final ==
Rank	Name	Nationality	Time	Notes
1st place, gold medalist(s)	Tigist Gashaw	Ethiopia	4:14.25	
2nd place, silver medalist(s)	Dawit Seyaum	Ethiopia	4:15.51	
3rd place, bronze medalist(s)	Alexa Efraimson	United States	4:16.07	
4	Bobby Clay	Great Britain	4:16.41	PB
5	Maria Dietz	Germany	4:19.71	
6	Ivine Chepkemoi	Kenya	4:20.55	
7	Lizerie Ferreira	South Africa	4:22.43	PB
8	Maki Izumida	Japan	4:22.46	
9	Anna Maxwell	United States	4:23.75	PB
10	Line Kalstrup Schulz	Denmark	4:25.17	
11	Carina Viljoen	South Africa	4:30.36	
12	Zheng Zhiling	China	4:31.91	
