= Simona Vrzalová =

Czech middle-distance runner

Personal information
- Born: 7 April 1988 (age 38)

Sport
- Sport: Athletics
- Event: 1500 metres
- Club: SSK Vítkovice
- Coached by: Augustin Šulc

Simona Vrzalová (born 7 April 1988) is a Czech middle-distance runner competing primarily in the 1500 metres. She represented her country at the 2017 World Championships and 2018 World Indoor Championships without advancing from the first round.

== International competitions ==
Year	Competition	Venue	Position	Event	Notes
Representing the Czech Republic
2017	European Indoor Championships	Belgrade, Serbia	10th (h)	1500 m	4:14.31
2017	World Championships	London, United Kingdom	–	1500 m	DNF
2018	World Indoor Championships	Birmingham, United Kingdom	21st (h)	1500 m	4:14.11
2018	European Championships	Berlin, Germany	5th	1500 m	4:06.47
2019	European Indoor Championships	Glasgow, United Kingdom	6th	1500 m	4:12.16
2021	Olympic Games	Tokyo, Japan	41st (h)	1500 m	4:19.46

== Personal bests ==
Outdoor

- 400 metres – 56.42 (Uherské Hradiste 2018)
- 800 metres – 2:02.99 (Šamorín 2018)
- 1000 metres – 2:38.20 (Birmingham 2018)
- 1500 metres – 4:04.80 (Ostrava 2018)
- One mile – 4:21.54 (London 2018)
- 3000 metres – 8:58.30 (Rovereto 2017)
- 5000 metres – 15:40.92 (Carquefou 2016)
- 5 kilometres – 18:45 (Bolzano 2010)
- 10 kilometres – 34:20 (Prague 2016)

Indoor

- 800 metres – 2:05.80 (Ostrava 2017)
- 1000 metres – 2:39.25 (Liévin 2019)
- 1500 metres – 4:10.04 (Ostrava 2017)
- 3000 metres – 8:57.07 (Ostrava 2018)
