= Giulia Aprile =

Italian middle-distance runner

Personal information
- Nationality: Italian
- Born: 11 October 1995 (age 30) Augusta
- Height: 1.66 m (5 ft 5 in)
- Weight: 49 kg (108 lb)

Sport
- Country: Italy
- Sport: Athletics
- Event: Middle-distance running
- Club: G.S. Esercito
- Coached by: Elisa Cusma

Achievements and titles
- Personal bests: 1500 m: 4:09.72 (2022); 1500 m indoor: 4:07.32 (2024)

Giulia Aprile (born 11 October 1995) is an Italian middle-distance runner who competed at one edition of the IAAF World Cross Country Championships at senior level (2017).

== Biography ==
She won seven national championships at individual senior level. She also was finalist at the 2017 European Athletics U23 Championships.

== Achievements ==
| Year | Competition | Venue | Position | Event | Time | Notes |
|---|---|---|---|---|---|---|
| 2014 | World Junior Championships | (United States) Eugene | Semi | 1500 m | 4:29.43 | |
| 2017 | World Cross Country Championships | (Uganda) Kampala | 10th | Mixed relay | 25:14 | |
| 2017 | European U23 Championships | (Poland) Bydgoszcz | 7th | 1500 m | 4:21.64 | |

== National titles ==
She has won 7 national titles at individual senior level.

- Italian Athletics Championships
  - 1500 m: 2017, 2018
- Italian Athletics Indoor Championships
  - 1500 m: 2017, 2019, 2022, 2024
  - 3000 m: 2021
