= Mhairi Maclennan =

British athlete (born 1995)

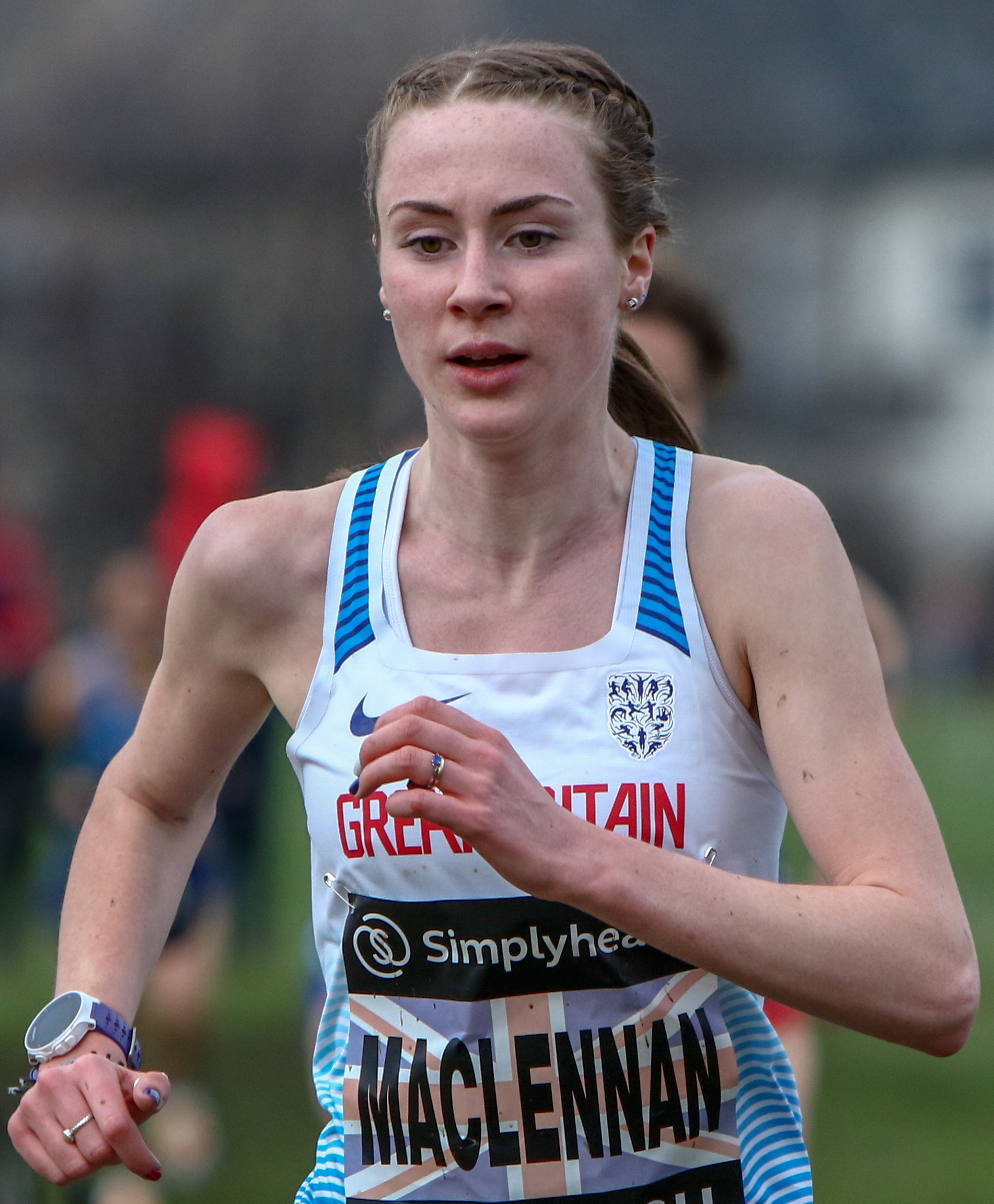
- Maclennan running in the Great Edinburgh International Cross Country, 2018

Personal information
- Nationality: Scottish
- Born: Mhairi Carmen Maclennan; 26 March 1995 (age 31)

Sport
- Sport: Athletics
- Events: Cross country, marathon

Achievements and titles
- Personal bests: Half marathon: 1:11:18 (Copenhagen, 2023); Marathon: 2:29:15 (London, 2024)

Mhairi Carmen Maclennan (born 26 March 1995) is a Scottish long-distance runner.

== Early life ==
From Kirkhill, she runs for the Inverness Harriers. She moved to Edinburgh as a teenager to pursue athletics and attend the University of Edinburgh. She later waived the right to anonymity to expose the sexual abuse she suffered at the hands of her coach in Edinburgh, John Lees, in an investigation by The Daily Telegraph. She spent a year training in Spain at the High-Performance Centre in Madrid.

== Career ==
In January 2022, she won the Scottish Inter District cross country championships at Irvine. In February 2022, she won the Scottish cross country title in Falkirk. In October 2022, she set a new course record at the Loch Ness 10k. She ran a half marathon personal best of 1:11.18 in Copenhagen in September 2023.

She won the Inverness half marathon in March 2024 and set the fastest women's time in the 39-year history of the race, running 1:11:47 breaking the previous record set by Natasha Phillips.

On her marathon debut she finished eleventh at the 2024 London Marathon in a time of 2:29:15.

In December 2024, she was named as a competitor for Great Britain at the 2025 European Road Running Championships held in April 2025 in Leuven, Belgium, although she later had to pull-out from the race.

== Personal life ==
She developed neurotic behaviour and disordered eating after being sexually abused by disgraced athletics coach John Lees, whose coaching licence was revoked in 2021 by an independent appeal committee. In February 2021, she along with pole vaulter Anna Gordon and middle-distance runner Kate Seary, wrote an open letter to UK Athletics urging for lifetime bans to be imposed on coaches found guilty of sexual or physical misconduct. She completed an internship in policy and public affairs at the British Heart Foundation. She and Seary started the advocacy group Kyniska for women in sport.
