= Charlotte Taylor (runner) =

British long-distance runner

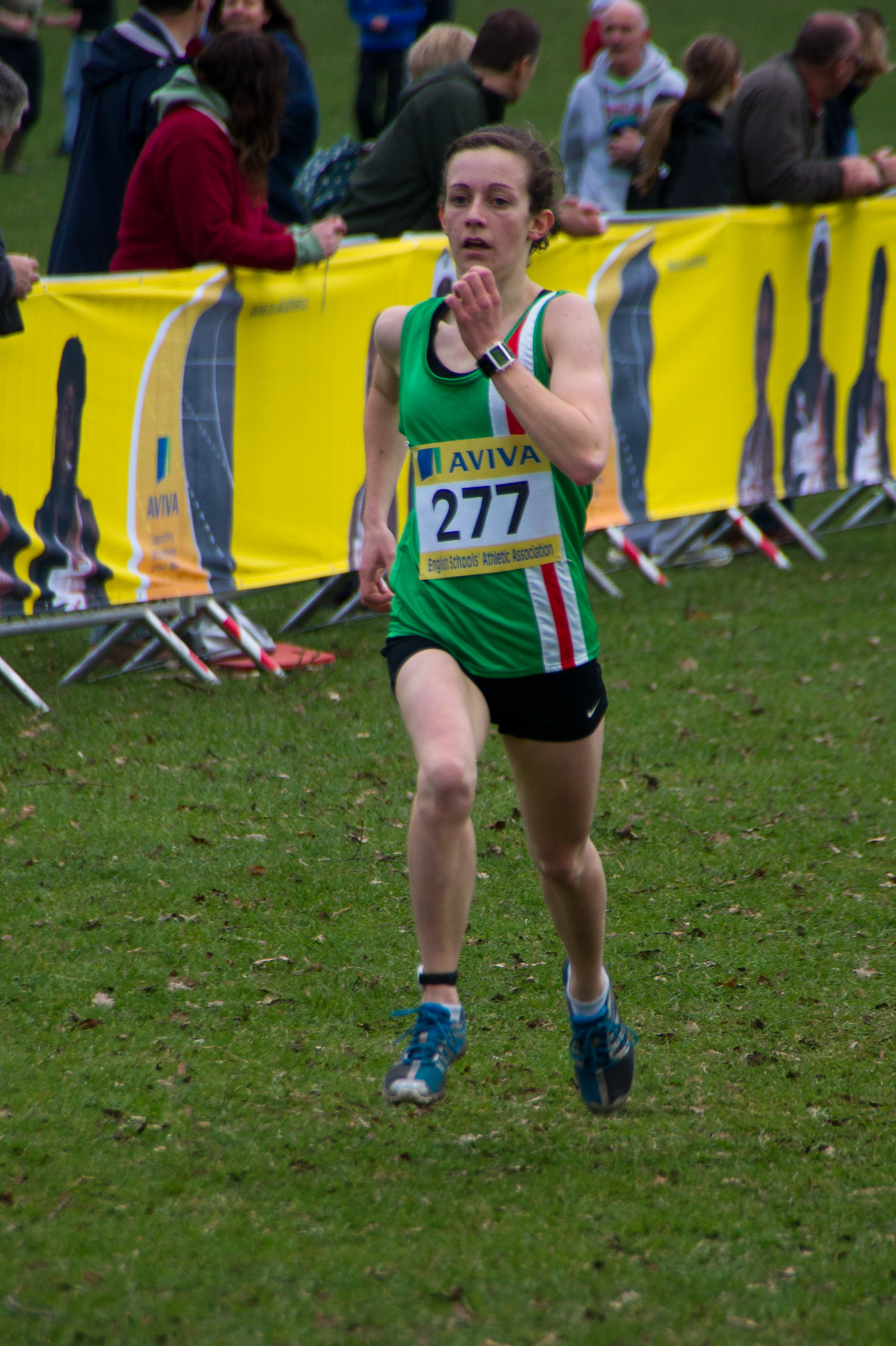
- Charlotte Taylor in 2011

Personal information
- Nationality: British
- Born: 17 January 1994 (age 32) Spalding, England

Sport
- Sport: Long-distance running
- Event: 10,000 metres
- Club: Saucony Freedom Track Club

Charlotte Taylor (born 17 January 1994) is a British long distance runner. She competed in the women's 10,000 metres at the 2017 World Championships in Athletics. She won an NCAA championship in the women's 10k in 2017. She attended the University of San Francisco, and also competed in half marathon.

== University of San Francisco ==
Representing San Francisco Dons track and field
Year	Championship	Event	Time	Place
2018	NCAA Division I Outdoor track and field Championship	5000 m	15:49.70	11th
2018	NCAA Division I Outdoor track and field Championship	10,000 m	32:17.95	5th
2017	NCAA Division I Outdoor track and field Championship	10,000 m	32:38.57	1st
2017	NCAA Division I Cross Country Championship	6000 m	19:28.6	3rd
