= Sarah McDonald =

English middle-distance runner

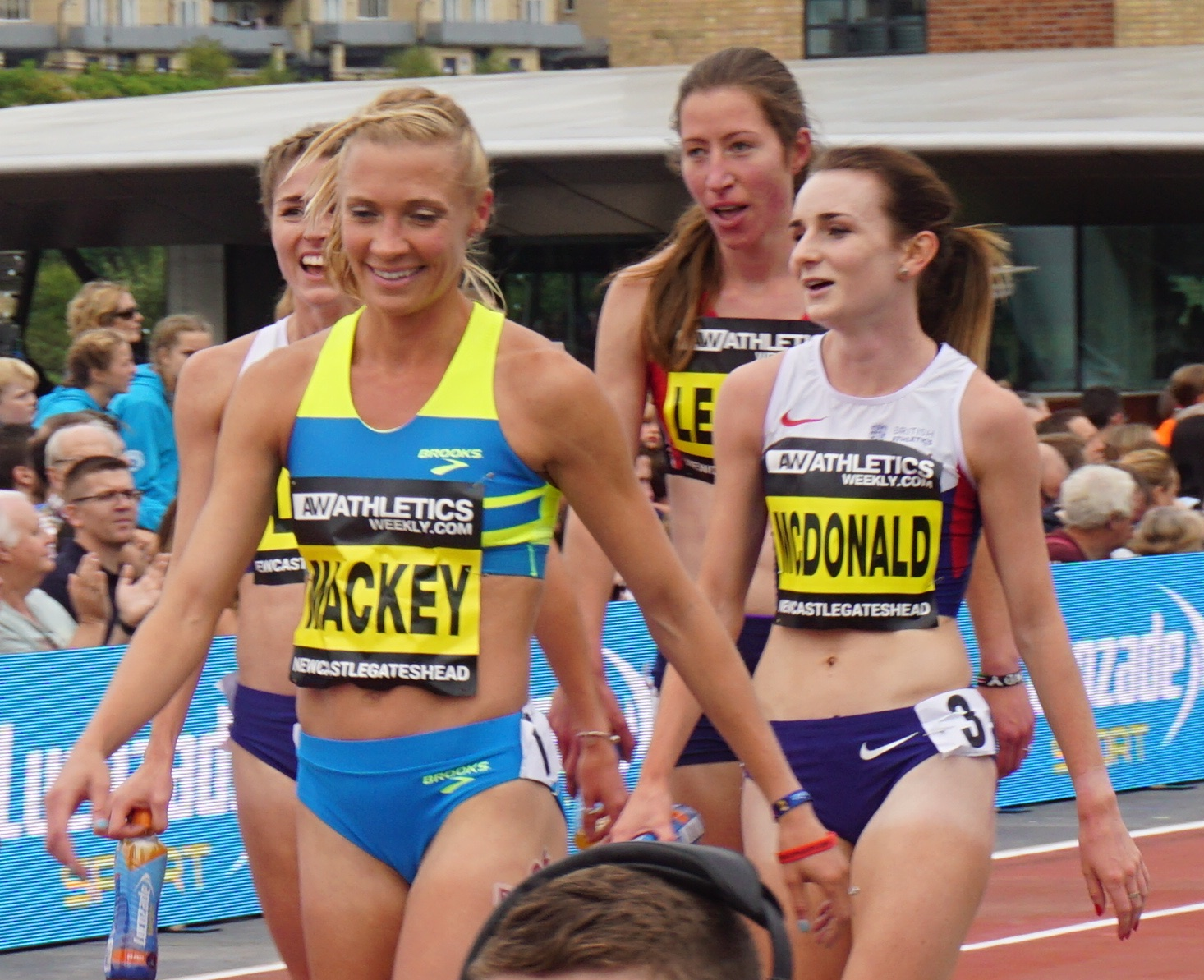
- Sarah McDonald (right) in 2016

Personal information
- Born: 2 August 1993 (age 33) Newcastle upon Tyne, England, United Kingdom
- Education: Birmingham University
- Height: 1.61 m (5 ft 3 in)
- Weight: 50 kg (110 lb)

Sport
- Sport: Athletics
- Event: 1500 metres
- Club: Birchfield Harriers
- Coached by: Andy Hobdell
Medal record
Women's cross country
Representing Great Britain
European Cross Country Championships
| Gold medal – first place | 2017 Šamorín | Mixed relay |
| Gold medal – first place | 2019 Lisbon | Mixed relay |

Sarah McDonald (born 2 August 1993) is an English middle-distance runner specialising in the 1500 metres. Sarah was born in Newcastle upon Tyne and attended the Royal Grammar School. She represented her country at the 2017 World Championships. In addition, she reached the final at the 2016 European Championships and 2017 European Indoor Championships. She became British Indoor Champion in 2017 over 1500m. In 2016 she became the English 800m Champion. At the European Cross Country Championships in 2017 she won team gold in the inaugural mixed relay, where she ran the fastest leg of the day. She represented England in the 2018 Commonwealth Games in Gold Coast reaching the 1500m Final. In 2019, she became British Champion over 1500m and also reached the Semi-Final of the World Championships in Doha. 2019 she won gold at the European Cross-Country in the mixed relay.

She was an ice-skater before turning to athletics after a serious hip injury. Sarah studied medicine at Birmingham University where she moved in 2011.

In early 2021, McDonald revealed she had been assaulted during a training run in Birmingham. The incident, in which a passenger on a passing moped grabbed her buttocks, left her in "a state of shock."

== International competitions ==
| Year | Competition | Venue | Position | Event | Notes |
Representing Great Britain and England
| 2016 | European Championships | Amsterdam, Netherlands | 9th | 1500 m | 4:34.93 |
| 2017 | European Indoor Championships | Belgrade, Serbia | 6th | 1500 m | 4:13.67 |
| 2017 | World Championships | London, United Kingdom | 17th (sf) | 1500 m | 4:06.73 |
| | European Cross Country | Šamorín, Slovakia | 1st | Mixed Relay | |
| 2018 | Commonwealth Games | Gold Coast, Australia | 8th | 1500 m | 4:05.77 |
| 2019 | European Indoor Championships | Glasgow, United Kingdom | 15th (h) | 1500 m | 4:17.64 |
| 2019 | World Championships | Doha, Qatar | 17th (sf) | 1500 m | 4:15.73 |
| | European Cross Country | Lisbon, Portugal | 1st | Mixed Relay | |

== Personal bests ==
Outdoor

- 400 metres – 55.35 (Hendon 2016)
- 800 metres – 1:59:91 (Tipton 2019)
- 1000 metres – 2:38:49 (Gothenburg 2017)
- 1500 metres – 4:00:46 (London 2019)
- One mile – 4:20:85 (London 2018)

Indoor

- 800 metres – 2:04:34(Sheffield 2019)
- 1000 metres – 2:39.53 (Birmingham 2017)
- 1500 metres – 4.07.62 (Boston 2018)
- One mile – 4:32.06 (New York 2017)
