= 2018 IAAF World Indoor Championships – Women's 1500 metres =

Women's 1500 metres at the 2018 IAAF World Indoor Championships
- Venue: Arena Birmingham
- Dates: 2–3 March
- Competitors: 26 from 18 nations
- Winning time: 4:05.27

Medalists
| gold medal | Genzebe Dibaba | Ethiopia |
| silver medal | Laura Muir | Great Britain |
| bronze medal | Sifan Hassan | Netherlands |

Video on YouTube Official Video

The women's 1500 metres at the 2018 IAAF World Indoor Championships took place on 2 and 3 March 2018.

== Summary ==
The final saw the return of several lead combatants from the 3000 metres two days earlier. Their strategies changed here. At the gun, world record holder Genzebe Dibaba started more aggressively, showing her intent to mark the leader, who turned out to be Beatrice Chepkoech. Returning champion, Sifan Hassan went to her familiar position at the back of the pack. After a lap of easy jogging, Rababe Arafi moved out to a faster pace, immediately marked by Dibaba. The additional speed quickly brought Hassan into a marking position on Chepkoech behind Dibaba, then Laura Muir squeezed through the inside to run behind Dibaba. After another lap, Dibaba tired of the gamesmanship and took the lead. Hassan, Muir, Chepkoech, Arafi and Winny Chebet formed a chase pack that separated from the rest of the field. Over two faster laps, Chepkoech moved past Hassan to mark Dibaba as the three broke away from the other three, with Muir looking like she was struggling to hold on to the back of the second group. But with three laps to go, Muir sprinted around the group and quickly bridged the gap back to lead group. Chepkoech struggled and fell off the back leaving a three-woman breakaway, with Dibaba leading Hassan then Muir with two laps to go. The medalists were decided as the two Kenyan women faded in the rearview mirror. The positions remained the same until the final backstretch when Muir sprinted past Hassan as Dibaba pulled away. Dibaba continued to pull away to the finish, Muir separating from Hassan.

== Results ==
=== Heats ===
The heats were started on 2 March at 19:13.

| Rank | Heat | Name | Nationality | Time | Notes |
|---|---|---|---|---|---|
| 1 | 3 | Sifan Hassan | Netherlands | 4:05.46 | Q, SB |
| 2 | 3 | Winny Chebet | Kenya | 4:05.81 | Q, PB |
| 3 | 3 | Rababe Arafi | Morocco | 4:06.12 | q |
| 4 | 3 | Shelby Houlihan | United States | 4:06.21 | q, PB |
| 5 | 1 | Genzebe Dibaba | Ethiopia | 4:06.25 | Q |
| 6 | 1 | Laura Muir | Great Britain | 4:06.54 | Q |
| 7 | 1 | Aisha Praught | Jamaica | 4:07.51 | q |
| 8 | 2 | Beatrice Chepkoech | Kenya | 4:09.12 | Q |
| 9 | 2 | Colleen Quigley | United States | 4:09.31 | Q, PB |
| 10 | 2 | Kate van Buskirk | Canada | 4:09.42 | PB |
| 11 | 2 | Dominique Scott | South Africa | 4:09.80 | |
| 12 | 1 | Marta Pérez | Spain | 4:09.90 | |
| 13 | 1 | Gabriela Stafford | Canada | 4:09.94 | PB |
| 14 | 3 | Dawit Seyaum | Ethiopia | 4:10.20 | |
| 15 | 3 | Linn Nilsson | Sweden | 4:10.36 | |
| 16 | 1 | Diana Sujew | Germany | 4:10.64 | |
| 17 | 1 | Luiza Gega | Albania | 4:10.65 | |
| 18 | 3 | Ciara Mageean | Ireland | 4:11.81 | |
| 19 | 2 | Hanna Klein | Germany | 4:12.11 | |
| 20 | 2 | Eilish McColgan | Great Britain | 4:13.32 | |
| 21 | 1 | Simona Vrzalová | Czech Republic | 4:14.11 | |
| 22 | 2 | Malika Akkaoui | Morocco | 4:15.09 | |
| 23 | 3 | Anita Hinriksdottir | Iceland | 4:15.73 | |
| 24 | 2 | Meraf Bahta | Sweden | 4:22.40 | qR |
| 25 | 2 | Claudia Bobocea | Romania | 4:24.60 | |
| | 1 | Eliane Saholinirina | Madagascar | DNF | |

=== Final ===
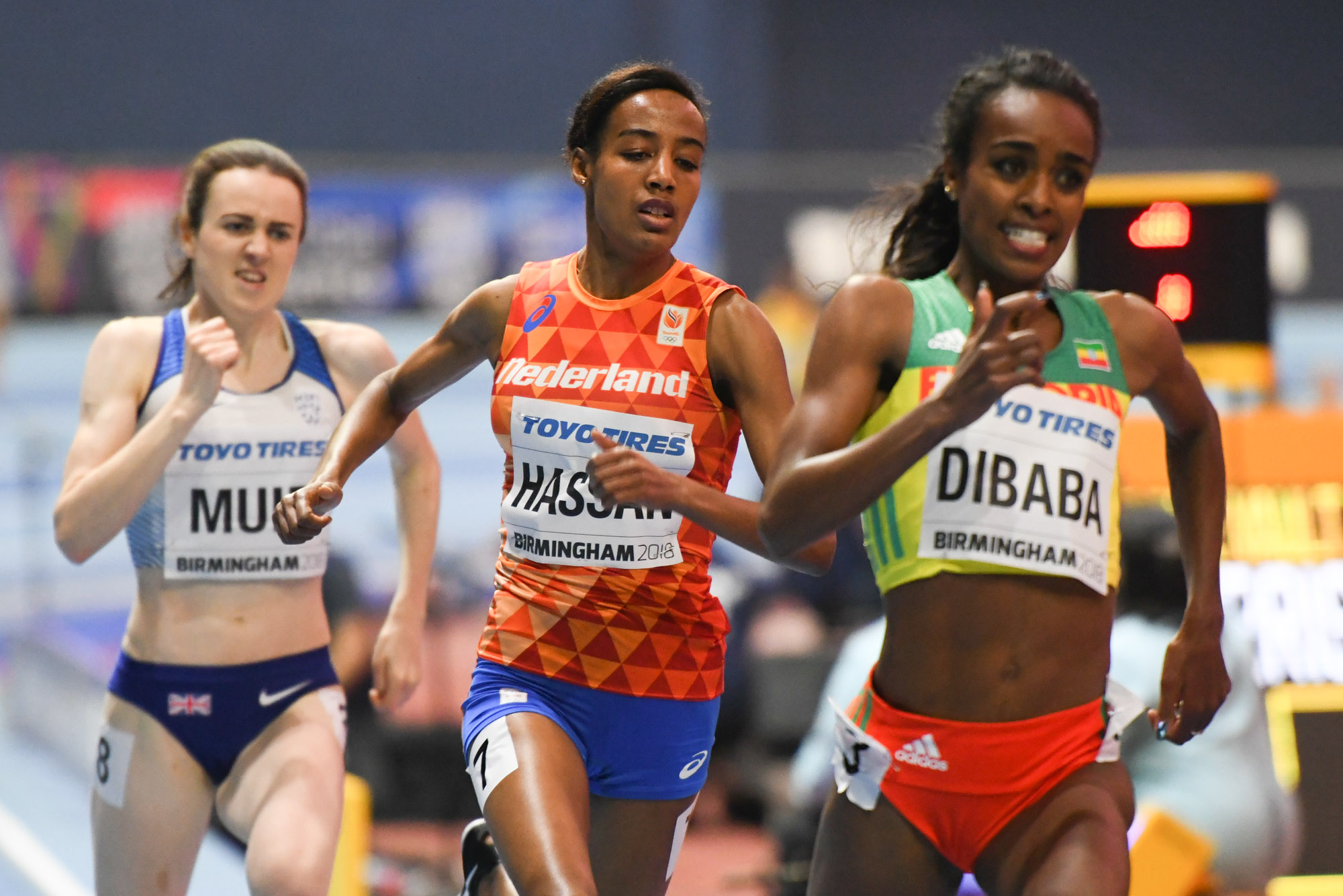
Final stages of the final

The final was started on 3 March at 20:39.

| Rank | Lane | Name | Nationality | Time | Notes |
|---|---|---|---|---|---|
| 1st place, gold medalist(s) | 3 | Genzebe Dibaba | Ethiopia | 4:05.27 | |
| 2nd place, silver medalist(s) | 8 | Laura Muir | Great Britain | 4:06.23 | |
| 3rd place, bronze medalist(s) | 7 | Sifan Hassan | Netherlands | 4:07.26 | |
| 4 | 5 | Shelby Houlihan | United States | 4:11.93 | |
| 5 | 4 | Winny Chebet | Kenya | 4:12.08 | |
| 6 | 2 | Aisha Praught | Jamaica | 4:12.86 | |
| 7 | 1 | Beatrice Chepkoech | Kenya | 4:13.59 | |
| 8 | 9 | Rababe Arafi | Morocco | 4:14.94 | |
| 9 | 6 | Colleen Quigley | United States | 4:15.97 | |
| 10 | 10 | Meraf Bahta | Sweden | 4:23.05 | |
