= 2008 World Junior Championships in Athletics – Women's 5000 metres =

The women's 5000 metres event at the 2008 World Junior Championships in Athletics was held in Bydgoszcz, Poland, at Zawisza Stadium on 8 July 2008.

== Medalists ==
Gold	Sule Utura; Ethiopia
Silver	Genzebe Dibaba; Ethiopia
Bronze	Nelly Ngeiywo; Kenya

== Results ==
=== Final ===
8 July

Rank	Name	Nationality	Time	Notes
1st place, gold medalist(s)	Sule Utura	Ethiopia	16:15.59	
2nd place, silver medalist(s)	Genzebe Dibaba	Ethiopia	16:16.75	
3rd place, bronze medalist(s)	Nelly Ngeiywo	Kenya	16:17.96	
4	Lucia Kamene Muangi	Kenya	16:25.04	
5	Kasumi Nishihara	Japan	16:33.28	
6	Olga Skrypak	Ukraine	16:36.46	
7	Kendra Schaff	Canada	16:37.79	
8	Emily Pidgeon	United Kingdom	16:41.29	
9	Nanako Hayashi	Japan	16:41.67	
10	Kim Seong-Eun	South Korea	16:42.17	
11	Catherine White	United States	16:48.70	
12	Ashley Higginson	United States	17:19.54	

== Participation ==
According to an unofficial count, 12 athletes from 8 countries participated in the event.

- Canada (1)
- Ethiopia (2)
- Japan (2)
- Kenya (2)
- South Korea (1)
- Ukraine (1)
- United Kingdom (1)
- United States (2)
