= Globengalan =

Annual indoor athletics event

- Date: February
- Location: Stockholm, Sweden
- Event type: Indoor track and field
- Established: 1990
- Website: Globengalan

The Globengalan is an annual indoor athletics event held in February at the Ericsson Globe in Stockholm, Sweden. The meeting was first held in 1990 and from 2000 to 2010 known as GE Galan, because General Electric was the official title sponsor. From 2011 to 2015 the official name changed to XL Galan and was sponsored by Swedish book-trade company XL-BYGG.

The 2016 edition was part of the inaugural IAAF World Indoor Tour, but after a loss of sponsorship, was not held in 2017.

Meseret Defar made a world record run in the 5000 metres at the 2009 edition. She returned for a second record attempt in 2010 and finished just hundredths of a second short of the record, although Alemitu Bekele's second-place finish improved the European record indoors.

== World records ==
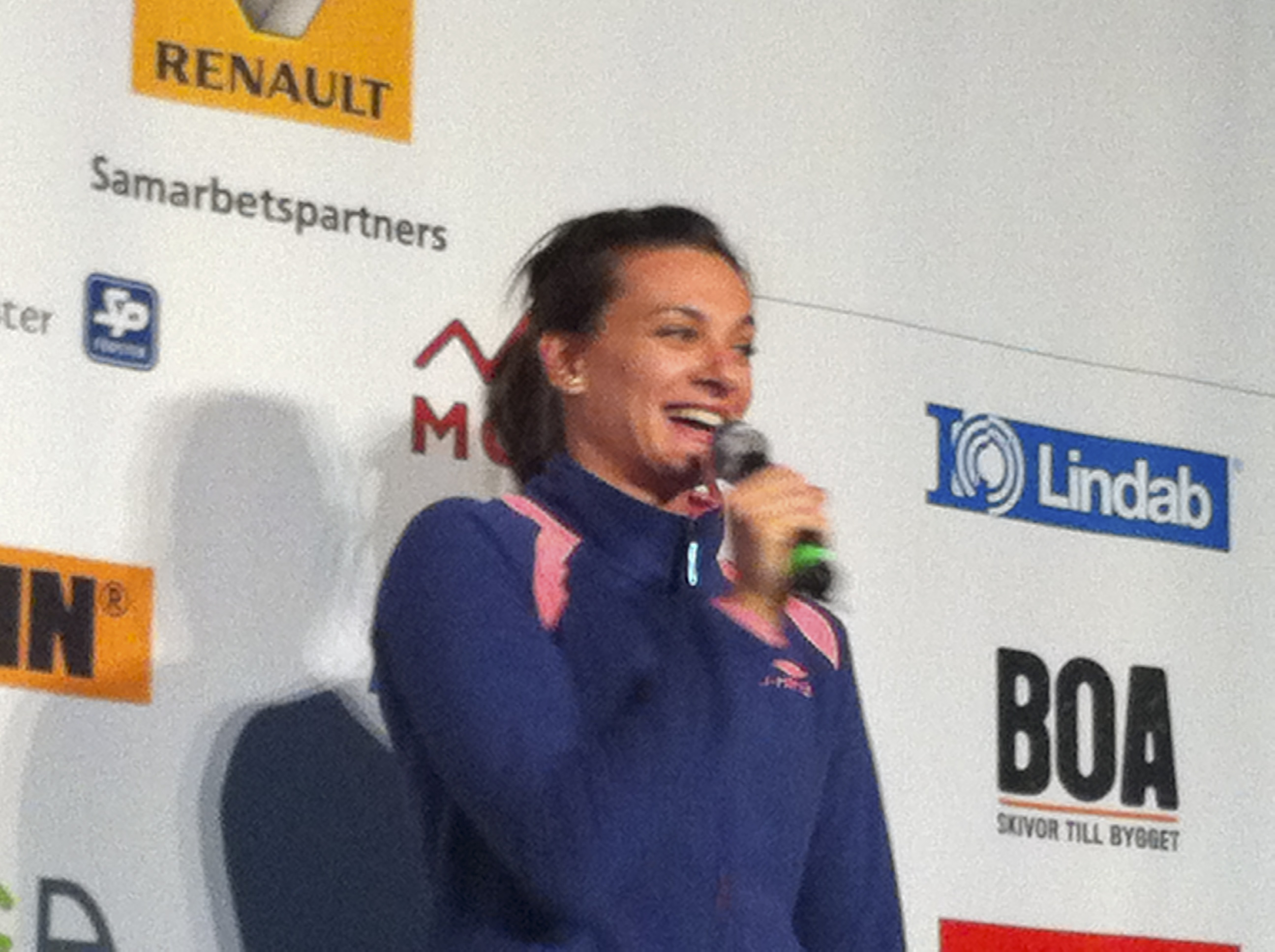
Yelena Isinbayeva after her world record 2012

Over the course of its history, numerous world records have been set at the GE Galan.

World records set at the Globengalan
| Year | Event | Record | Athlete | Nationality | Ref. |
|---|---|---|---|---|---|
| 1996 | 1000 m | 2:31.23 | Maria Mutola | Mozambique | |
| 1997 | 5000 m | 12:59.04 | Haile Gebrselassie | Ethiopia | |
| 1998 | 5000 m | 12:51.48 | Daniel Komen | Kenya | |
| 1999 | 1000 m | 2:30.94 | Maria Mutola | Mozambique | |
| 1999 | Pole vault | 4.56 m | Nicole Humbert | Germany | |
| 2002 | Pole vault | 4.72 m | Svetlana Feofanova | Russia | |
| 2009 | 5000 m | 14:24.37 | Meseret Defar | Ethiopia | |
| 2012 | Pole vault | 5.01 m | Yelena Isinbayeva | Russia | |
| 2014 | 3000 m | 8:16.60 | Genzebe Dibaba | Ethiopia | |
| 2015 | 5000 m | 14:18.86 | Genzebe Dibaba | Ethiopia | |
| 2016 | 1000 m | 2:14.20 | Ayanleh Souleiman | Djibouti | |
| 2016 | Mile | 4:13.31 | Genzebe Dibaba | Ethiopia | |

== Meeting records ==
=== Men ===
Men's meeting records of the Globengalan
| Event | Record | Athlete | Nationality | Date | Ref. |
|---|---|---|---|---|---|
| 60 m | 6.51 | Bruny Surin | Canada | 1997 | |
| 200 m | 20.60 | Jeff Williams | United States | 1996 | |
| 400 m | 45.39 | Abdalleleh Haroun | Qatar | 19 February 2015 | |
| 800 m | 1:44.34 | Yuriy Borzakovskiy | Russia | 2003 | |
| 1000 m | 2:14.20 | Ayanleh Souleiman | Djibouti | 17 February 2016 | |
| 1500 m | 3:33.39 | Laban Rotich | Kenya | 1999 | |
| Mile | 3:52.18 | Rui Silva | Portugal | 2001 | |
| 3000 m | 7:30.16 | Galen Rupp | United States | 21 February 2013 | |
| 5000 m | 12:51.48 | Daniel Komen | Kenya | 1998 | |
| 60 m hurdles | 7.42 | Colin Jackson | United Kingdom | 1994 | |
| High jump | 2.38 m | Yaroslav Rybakov | Russia | 15 February 2005 | |
| Pole vault | 5.92 m | Maksim Tarasov | Russia | 1998 | |
| Pole vault | 5.92 m | Igor Potapovich | Kazakhstan | 1998 | |
| Long jump | 8.49 m | Carl Lewis | United States | 1992 | |
| Triple jump | 17.64 m | Christian Olsson | Sweden | 12 February 2004 | |
| Shot put | 21.33 m | Tim Nedow | Canada | 17 February 2016 | |
| Heptathlon | 6188 pts | Erki Nool | Estonia | 1996 | |
| Heptathlon | (60 m), (long jump), (shot put), (high jump), (60 m hurdles), (pole vault), (1000 m) | | | | |

=== Women ===
Women's meeting records of the Globengalan
| Event | Record | Athlete | Nationality | Date | Ref. |
|---|---|---|---|---|---|
| 60 m | 7.03 | Gail Devers | United States | 1999 | |
| 200 m | 23.37 | Michelle-Lee Ahye | Trinidad and Tobago | 19 February 2015 | |
| 400 m | 50.94 | Grit Breuer | Germany | 1998 | |
| 800 m | 1:57.67 | Stephanie Graf | Austria | 2001 | |
| 1000 m | 2:30.94 | Maria Mutola | Mozambique | 1999 | |
| 1500 m | 3:56.46+ | Genzebe Dibaba | Ethiopia | 17 February 2016 | |
| Mile | 4:13.31 | Genzebe Dibaba | Ethiopia | 17 February 2016 | |
| 3000 m | 8:16.60 | Genzebe Dibaba | Ethiopia | 6 February 2014 | |
| 5000 m | 14:18.86 | Genzebe Dibaba | Ethiopia | 19 February 2015 | |
| 60 m hurdles | 7.74 | Susanna Kallur | Sweden | 21 February 2008 | |
| High jump | 2.03 m | Kajsa Bergqvist | Sweden | 2003 | |
| Pole vault | 5.01 m | Yelena Isinbayeva | Russia | 23 February 2012 | |
| Long jump | 6.99 m | Christabel Nettey | Canada | 19 February 2015 | |
| Triple jump | 14.79 m | Olga Saladukha | Ukraine | 23 February 2012 | |
| Shot put | 19.79 m | Astrid Kumbernuss | Germany | 1996 | |
| Pentathlon | 4685 pts | Yelena Lebedenko | Russia | 1996 | |
| Pentathlon | (60 m hurdles), (high jump), (shot put), (long jump), (800 m) | | | | |
