= Katie Mackey =

American middle-distance runner (born 1987)

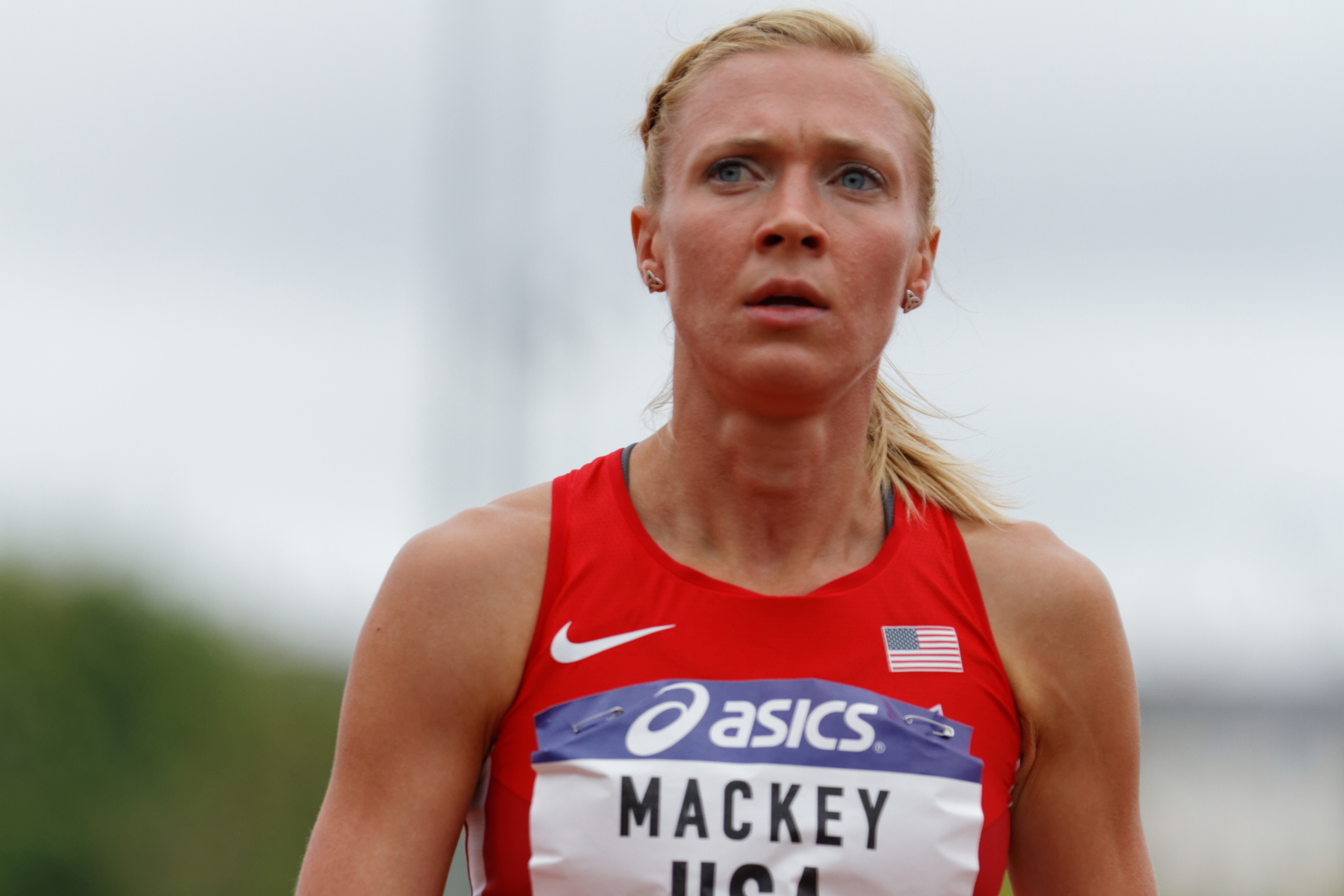
- Follett at 2014 DécaNation

Personal information
- Born: Katherine Follett; November 12, 1987 (age 38) Fort Collins, Colorado, U.S.
- Height: 5 ft 4 in (1.63 m)

Sport
- Sport: Track and field, Cross country running
- Events: 1500 metres 5000 metres
- College team: Washington Huskies
- Club: Elevated Performance
- Turned pro: 2010
- Coached by: Jeff Boelé

Achievements and titles
Personal best
800 metres	2:01.20 (2015)
1500 metres	4:03.81 (2015)
Mile	4:25.48 (2016)
3000 metres	8:43.15 (2018)
5000 metres	15:04.74 (2014)
Medal record
Women's athletics
Representing the United States
World Relay Championships
Silver medal – second place	2014 Nassau	4×1500 m relay

Katherine "Katie" Mackey; born November 12, 1987) is an American middle-distance runner. She placed 8th at 2018 IAAF World Indoor Championships – Women's 3000 metres.

== Career ==
=== 2018 season ===
Mackey won a US national xc title over 6 km in 19:35 at 2018 USATF National Club Cross Country Championships.

Mackey placed 6th in the 5000 m in 15:39.25 at 2018 USA Outdoor Track and Field Championships.

Mackey finished 2nd in the 3,000 meters at the 2018 USA Indoor Track and Field Championships, qualifying her for the 2018 IAAF World Indoor Championships where she placed 8th.

=== 2017 season ===
In 2017, Mackey won the U.S. road mile championship.

=== 2016 season ===
She finished 6th at the 2016 United States Olympic Trials in the 5,000 meters.

=== 2015 season ===
Mackey placed 6th in 5000 m final in 15:16.96 at 2015 USA Outdoor Track and Field Championships

Mackey won the 2015 Stockholm Bauhaus Athletics 3,000 meter 2015 IAAF Diamond League event.

=== 2014 season ===
Mackey placed 3rd in 1500 m final in 4:07.70 at 2014 USA Outdoor Track and Field Championships.

Mackey won a silver medal at the 2014 IAAF World Relays in the women's 4 × 1500 metres relay.

Mackey placed 8th in 5000 m at the 2014 IAAF Continental Cup in the 5000 m.

=== 2013 season ===
Mackey placed 8th in 15:57.78 in the 5000 m final and 9th in 4:32.10 in the 1500 m final at the 2013 USA Outdoor Track and Field Championships.

=== 2012 season ===
Mackey placed 11th in the 1500 m at the 2012 United States Olympic Trials (track and field) in 4:11.46 and DNS in 5000 m.

=== 2008 season ===
Mackey placed 21st in the 1500 m at the 2008 United States Olympic Trials (track and field) in 4:22.60.

== College career ==
At the University of Washington, Mackey was an eight-time All-American.

Representing University of Washington
School Year	Pac-12 Conference Cross Country Championship	NCAA Division I Cross Country Championship	Mountain Pacific Sports Federation Indoor track and field Championship	NCAA Division I Indoor track and field Championship	Pac-12 Conference Outdoor Track and Field Championship	NCAA Division I Outdoor Track and Field Championship
2009-10 Senior	6 km 8th	6 km 23rd	Mile 3rd 4:39.91 DMR 6th 11:37.79	Mile 2nd 4:36.39	1500 m 2nd 4:16.00	1500 m 10th 4:20.19
2008-09 Junior	6 km 5th	6 km 26th	DMR 1st 11:16.57 Mile 3rd 4:40.83	3000 m 5th 9:15.73 DMR 8th	1500 m 1st 4:26.62	5000 m 12th 16:56.72
2007-08 Sophomore	6 km 9th	6 km 19th	3000 m 2nd DMR 2nd	Mile 6th 4:41.88	1500 m 1st 4:22.41 5000 m 6th 17:00.12	1500m 14th 4:19.00
2006-07 Freshman	6 km 79th 23:17.0		Mile 6th 4:52.08		1500 m 8th 4:27.87	

== Prep ==
Mackey won the Elanor Troxell Award in 2006 as Fort Collins' top student-athlete.

Mackey an 11-time conference champion, 13-time regional champion, and 11-time all-state performer in both cross country and track for Fort Collins High School.

Mackey set Fort Collins school records in the 3200 m (10:47.51) and 3200 m relay, and at 5 km in cross country (18:16).

== Personal life ==
Mackey met Danny Mackey in February 2011 and they were married on New Year's Eve in 2011. He became her coach in 2012. She moved back to Colorado in 2019 and her current coach is Jeff Boelé. In September 2021, Mackey had a son named Joshua.
