= Genzebe Dibaba =

Ethiopian middle and long-distance runner (born 1991)

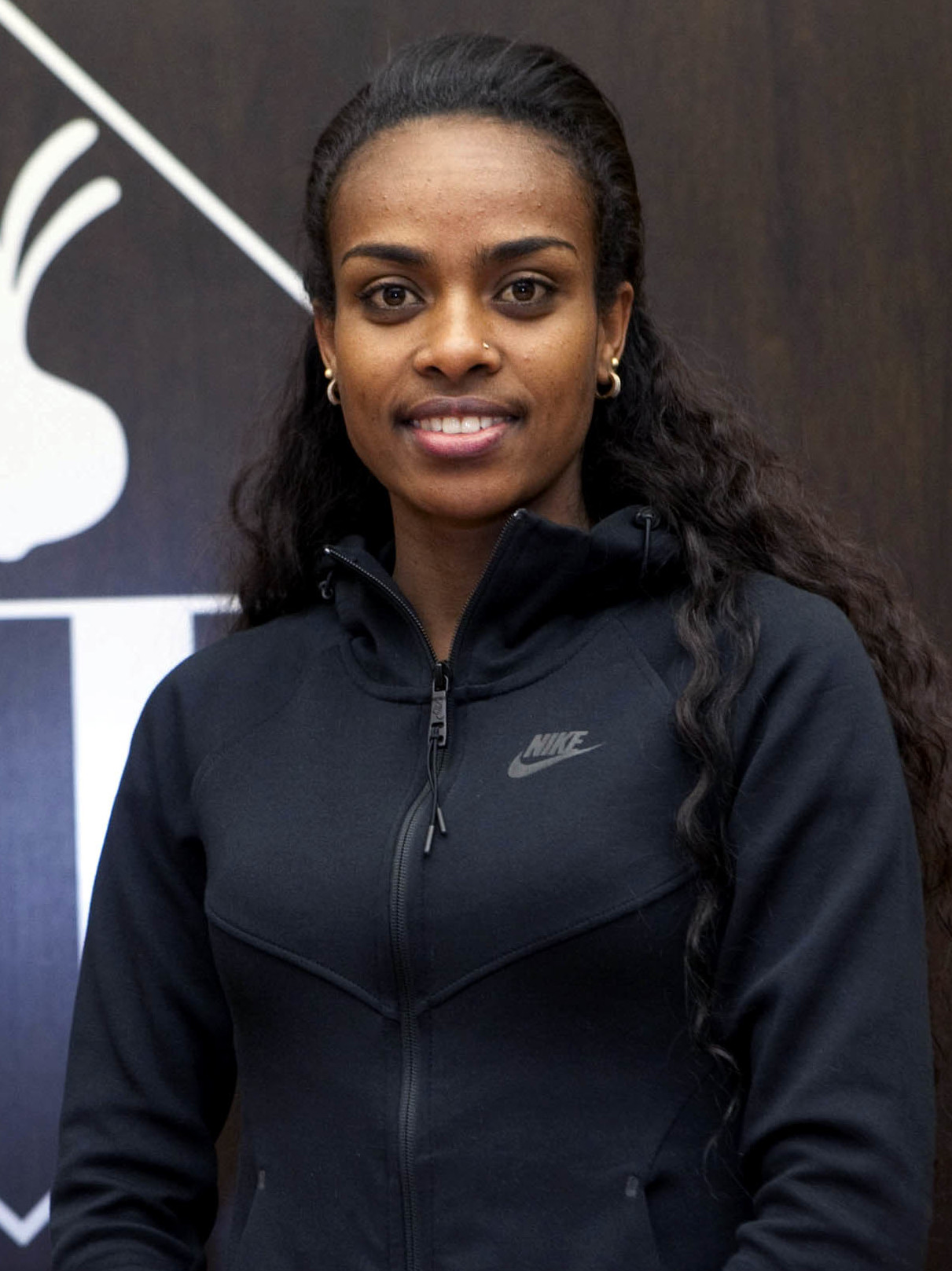
- Genzebe Dibaba in 2016

Personal information
- Full name: Genzebe Dibaba Keneni
- Born: 8 February 1991 (age 35) Chefe, Bekoji, Arsi Province, PDR Ethiopia
- Height: 168 cm (5 ft 6 in)
- Weight: 52 kg (115 lb)
- Relatives: Tirunesh Dibaba (sister); Ejegayehu Dibaba (sister); Derartu Tulu (cousin)

Sport
- Country: Ethiopia
- Sport: Women's athletics
- Events: 1500 metres, 3000 metres, 5000 metres
- Team: NN Running Team (2023–)
- Coached by: Tolera Dinka

Achievements and titles
- Olympic finals: 2012; 1500 m, 22nd (h); 2016; 1500 m, Silver
- World finals: 2009; 5000 m, 8th; 2011; 5000 m, 8th; 2013; 1500 m, 7th; 2015; 1500 m, Gold; 5000 m, Bronze; 2017; 1500 m, 12th
- Personal bests: 1500 m: 3:50.07 NR (Monaco 2015); Mile: 4:14.30 NR (Rovereto 2016); 3000 m: 8:21.29 (Palo Alto 2019); 5000 m: 14:15.41 (Paris 2015); Indoors; 1000 m: 2:33.06i NR (Madrid 2017); 1500 m: 3:55.17i (Karlsruhe 2014); Mile: 4:13.31i WR (Stockholm 2016); 2000 m: 5:23.75i WB (Sabadell 2017); 3000 m: 8:16.60i WR (Stockholm 2014); Two miles: 9:00.48i WB (Birmingham 2014); 5000 m: 14:18.86i WR (Stockholm 2015)
Medal record
Women's athletics
Representing Ethiopia
	Olympic Games	0
Olympic Games
Silver medal – second place	2016 Rio de Janeiro	1500 m
World Championships
Gold medal – first place	2015 Beijing	1500 m
Bronze medal – third place	2015 Beijing	5000 m
World Indoor Championships
Gold medal – first place	2012 Istanbul	1500 m
Gold medal – first place	2014 Sopot	3000 m
Gold medal – first place	2016 Portland	3000 m
Gold medal – first place	2018 Birmingham	1500 m
Gold medal – first place	2018 Birmingham	3000 m
African Championships
Silver medal – second place	2014 Marrakesh	5000 m
Continental Cup
Gold medal – first place	2014 Marrakesh	3000 m
Diamond League
First place	2015	5000 m
World Junior Championships
Gold medal – first place	2010 Moncton	5000 m
Silver medal – second place	2008 Bydgoszcz	5000 m
World Cross Country Championships
Gold medal – first place	2008 Edinburgh	Junior race
Gold medal – first place	2008 Edinburgh	Junior team
Gold medal – first place	2009 Amman	Junior race
Gold medal – first place	2009 Amman	Junior team
Silver medal – second place	2010 Bydgoszcz	Junior team
Silver medal – second place	2011 Punta Umbria	Senior team
Silver medal – second place	2017 Kampala	Mixed relay
Bronze medal – third place	2007 Mombasa	Junior team

Genzebe Dibaba Keneni (Oromo: Ganzabee Dibaabaa Qananii; Amharic: ገንዘቤ ዲባባ ቀነኒ; born 8 February 1991) is an Ethiopian middle- and long-distance runner. A 1,500 metres 2016 Rio Olympics silver medalist, she won a gold medal in this event and a bronze in the 5,000 metres at the 2015 World Championships. Genzebe holds the world record for the indoor events of the one mile, 3,000m and 5,000m.

Having competed at all World Athletics Championships between 2009 and 2017, Genzebe placed in the finals of all events in which she took part. She is a five-time World Indoor champion, winning the 1,500m in 2012, the 3,000m in 2014 and 2016, and securing the 1,500m/3,000m double in 2018. She was highly successful as a junior athlete. In 2008, at age 17, she won her first World Cross Country Championships under-20 title and took a silver medal in the 5,000m at the World U20 Championships. The next year, Genzebe added her second Cross Country U20 title, and in 2010, the World U20 Championships 5,000m gold. She won the 2015 Diamond League title. She was named Laureus Sportswoman of the Year for 2014, and IAAF World Female Athlete of the Year in 2015.

Genzebe comes from a sporting family of several Olympic medalists, which includes her sisters Tirunesh and Ejegayehu, and her cousin, Derartu Tulu.

== Background ==
Genzebe Dibaba is a member of the Oromo ethnic group from the high altitude Arsi Zone of the Oromia Region and comes from an athletic family. Her older sister Tirunesh is a celebrated athlete who won many major medals. Another older sister, Ejegayehu, won the silver medal in the 10,000 metres at the 2004 Summer Olympics, and her brother Dejene is also an athlete. Her cousin is Derartu Tulu, the 1992 and 2000 Olympic champion in 10,000 m.

== Career ==
Genzebe won the junior women's title at both the 2008 and 2009 IAAF World Cross Country Championships and finished fifth in the same event in 2007. She became the second junior woman ever to win two junior cross country championships in a row. She also competed in IAAF Golden League meetings, including the Reebok Grand Prix and the Oslo Bislett Games. At the 2008 Bislett Games, Genzebe recorded a personal best time of 15:02.41 in the 5000 metres, during the same race where her sister Tirunesh set a new world record. She did the same a year later in the same race, improving her personal best by more than five seconds.

=== 2009–2010 ===
After winning the 5000 m at the Ethiopian Athletics Championships, she was included in the Ethiopian squad for the 2009 IAAF World Athletics Championships. In Berlin she replaced Tirunesh on Ethiopia's 5000 m team, who withdrew due to injury. Genzebe ran an excellent heat, finishing fourth and qualifying for the final where, in her first major senior championship race, she finished in eighth position. She also won the 5000 m gold at the 2009 African Junior Athletics Championships.

She began her 2009–10 cross country campaign with a win at the Cross de Atapuerca. She also competed indoors, improving her 1500 m best to 4:04.80 at the Indoor Flanders meeting. Despite her wins on the senior circuit, she failed to complete a hat-trick of junior race titles at the 2010 IAAF World Cross Country Championships. She performed far below expectations, ending up in eleventh and barely making it into the silver medal-winning Ethiopian team. Her fortunes improved at the 2010 World Junior Championships in Athletics as she defeated the junior cross country winner Mercy Cherono to take the 5000 m gold in a championship record time. In November, she took a second consecutive victory at the Cross de Atapuerca, taking a prominent scalp in Emily Chebet (the reigning senior champion).

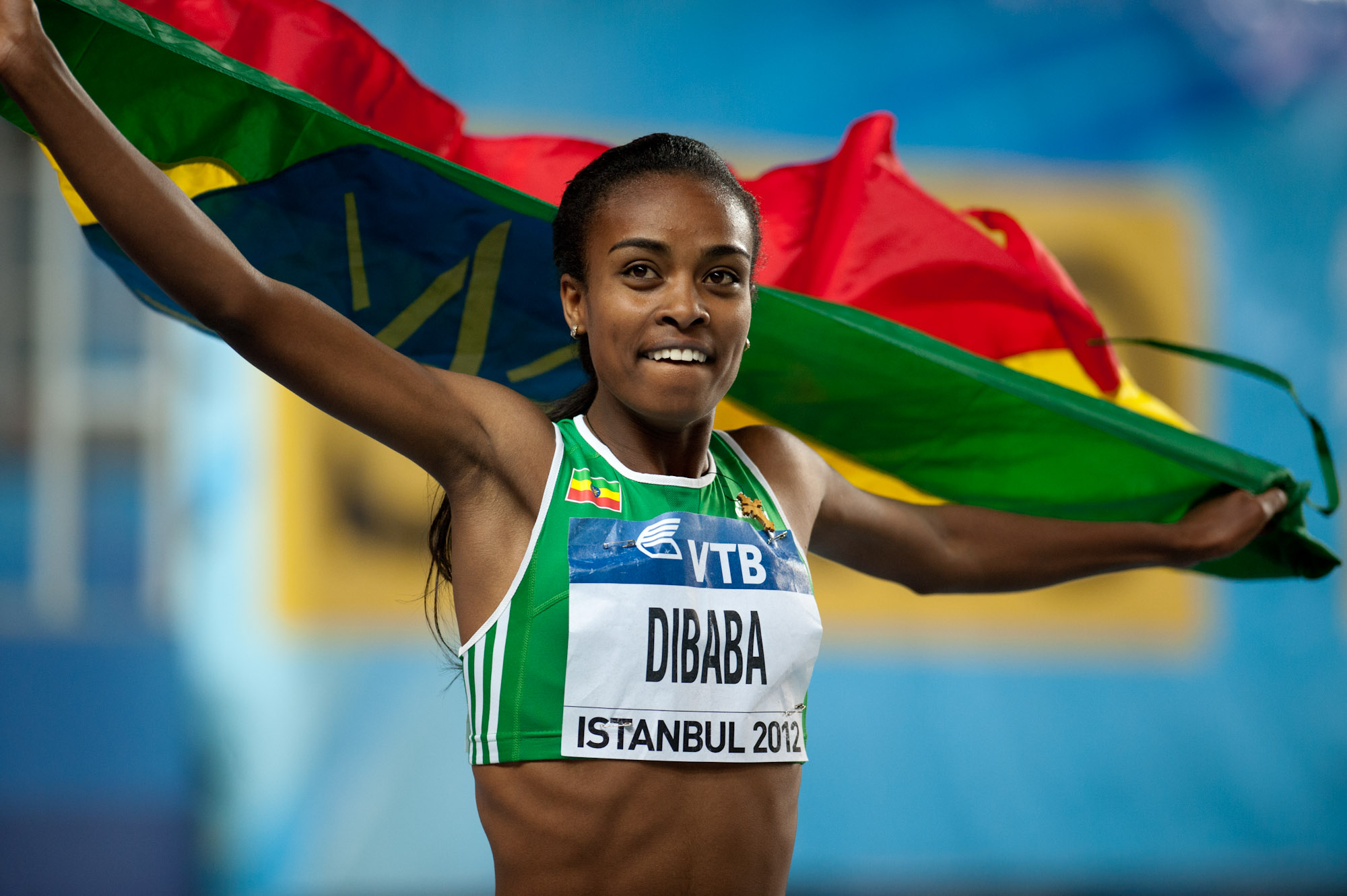
Genzebe's first senior world title (1500 m) at the 2012 World Indoor Championships

=== 2011–2012 ===
She was the runner-up at the Great Edinburgh Cross Country in January 2011 behind Linet Masai. She placed ninth at the 2011 IAAF World Cross Country Championships two months later. Genzebe improved her 5000 m best to 14:37.56 minutes at the Bislett Games and went on to place eighth in the event at the 2011 World Championships in Athletics. After this point she began to move away from the 5000 m and focus on the 1500 metres instead – a move which paid significant dividends for her career.

She began 2012 with the fifth fastest ever indoor 1500 m, winning the Weltklasse in Karlsruhe in 4:00.13 minutes. A win at the Aviva Indoor Grand Prix preceded her first world title at the 2012 IAAF World Indoor Championships. Turning to the outdoor track, Genzebe ran an Ethiopian record time of 3:57.77 minutes at the Shanghai Golden Grand Prix. She was third at the Golden Gala and runner-up at the Bislett Games. She was selected for the 2012 London Olympics, but a hamstring injury in the final lap of her heat saw her eliminated from the competition.

=== 2013–2014 ===
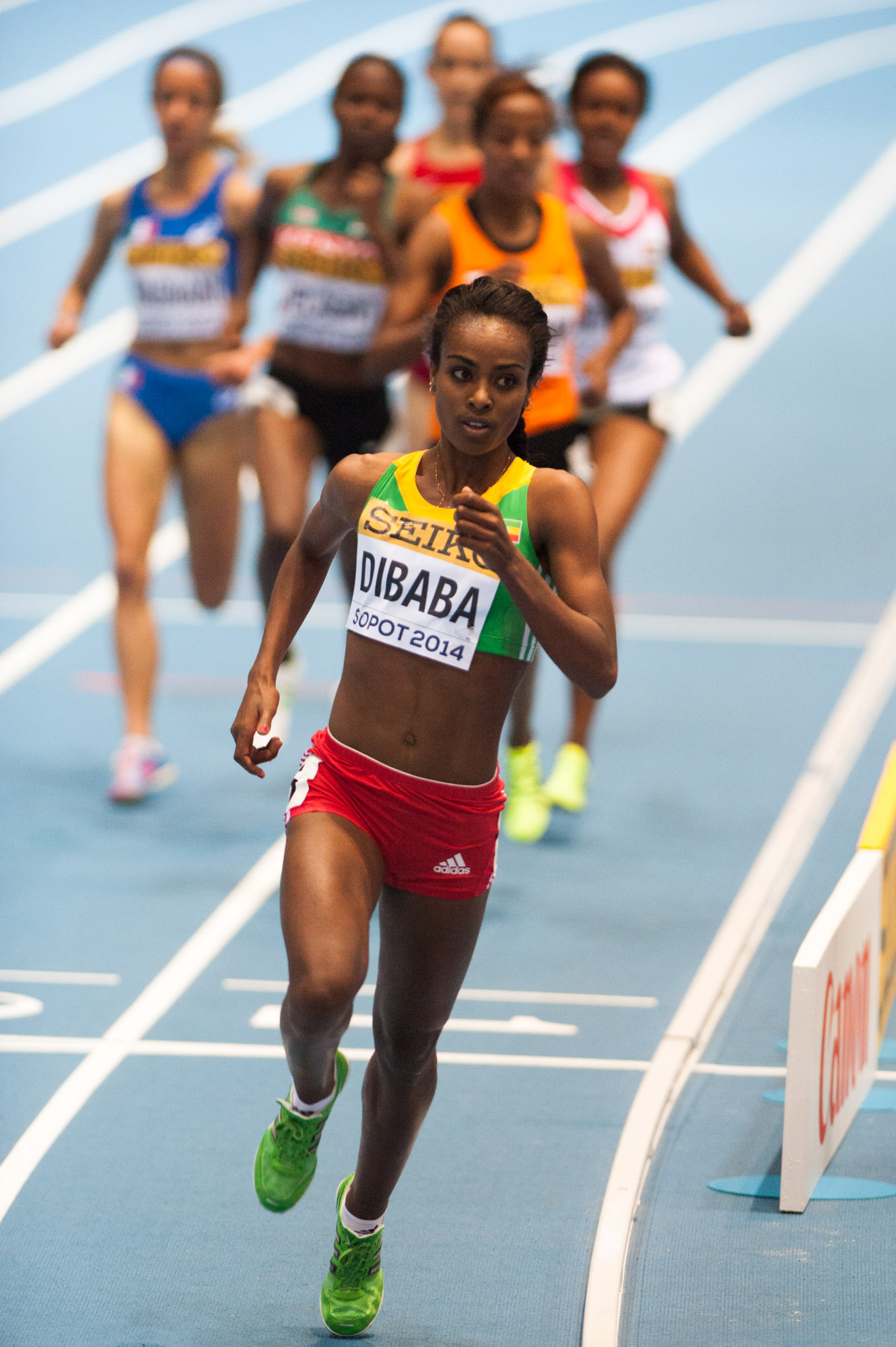
Genzebe en route her 3000m gold at the 2014 World Indoor Championships in Sopot

Genzebe opened 2013 on grass, winning the 3 km competition at the Great Edinburgh Cross Country, then took two indoor wins in Karlsruhe and Birmingham.

On 1 February 2014, in Karlsruhe, Germany, Genzebe ran 3:55.17 in the 1500 m indoor event, beating the previous indoor world record by over 3 seconds. This mark was the fastest 1500 m in the world, indoor or outdoor, since 1997.

Five days later, she improved the world indoor record in the 3000 metres to 8:16.60 at the XL Galan meet in Stockholm, Sweden. In that one race, Genzebe improved her own personal record by over thirty seconds, the world record by almost seven, and even though it was set on a shorter track indoors, her time was the number four time at the distance ever. Only on one occasion has the time been bettered, that was the 1993 Chinese National Games, when three athletes Wang Junxia, Qu Yunxia and Zhang Linli set the event on its ear, running times that had previously not been approached in two decades. In the month of February and in just 15 days Genzebe broke her third world record at indoor two-mile race at the Birmingham Indoor Grand Prix; nine minutes and 0.48 seconds was her new record that shattered Meseret Defar previous best by six seconds.

With these records, Genzebe is one of only three athletes in history to break three world records in three different events within 15 days, joining Jesse Owens, who set three world records and tied another within 1 hour, and Usain Bolt. She stands alone as the only one to do this feat in three different cities and meets, and in all individual events under FAT.

In summer IAAF Diamond League competition, Genzebe won the 1500 m at Monaco.

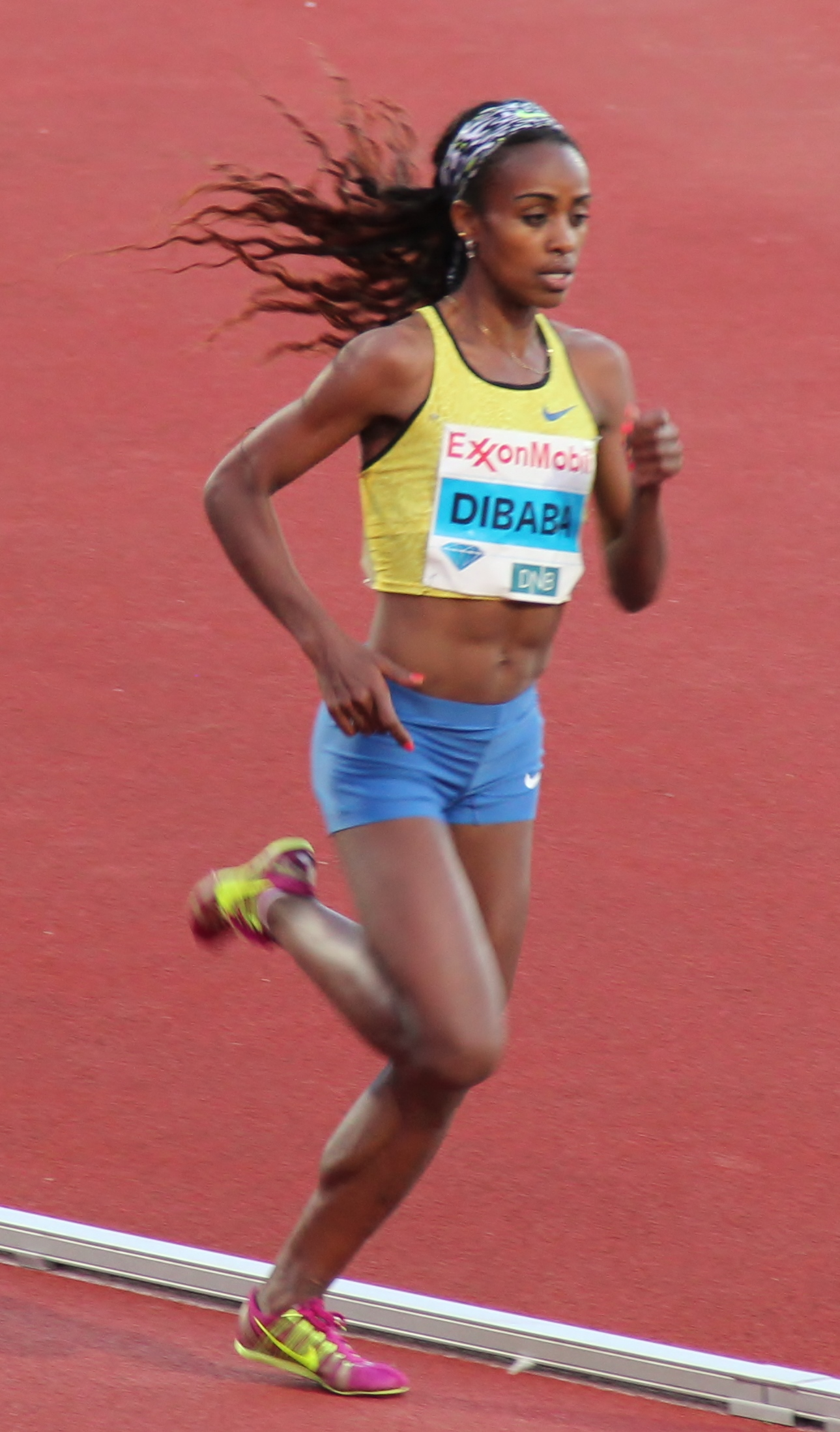
Genzebe at the Bislett Games in Oslo in 2015

=== 2015 ===
During 2015 Genzebe changed shoe sponsor. In February in XL-Galan, Stockholm, she ran for Adidas, and in March in Carlsbad (CA, USA), she had her first official competition in Nike dress in the 5k-race, where she missed the world record by a small margin. The change of sponsor was associated with the change of manager – from Dutch Jos Hermens (Global Sports Communication) to Swedish Ulf Saletti. The manager change happened a few months before the sponsor change. Saletti was a meeting director at Stockholm XL-Galan where she on 19 February 2015 repeated the achievement from the year before by setting a world record, now at the 5000 metres with 14:18.86.

Genzebe won the women's 5000 m at the 2015 Prefontaine Classic in Eugene, Oregon, in a then-personal best time of 14:19.76. She then went on to win the 5000 m at the Diamond League Meet Areva in Paris on July 4 in a new personal best time of 14:15:41. This was her fifth 5000 metres run under 14:30. Only four days later, in Barcelona, she set a new African record for the 1500 m of 3:54.11 (video), virtually single-handedly running the fastest 1500 m in the world in 18 years and the ninth fastest of all time. Six of the eight fastest times ahead of her occurred in two races at the 1993 Chinese National Games, where much of the running community believes the communist government was sponsoring a doping scheme in the days before serious drug testing was required. On 17 July 2015 in Monaco, Genzebe broke the 1500 m world record, which had previously been considered near-unbreakable, in a time of 3:50:07.

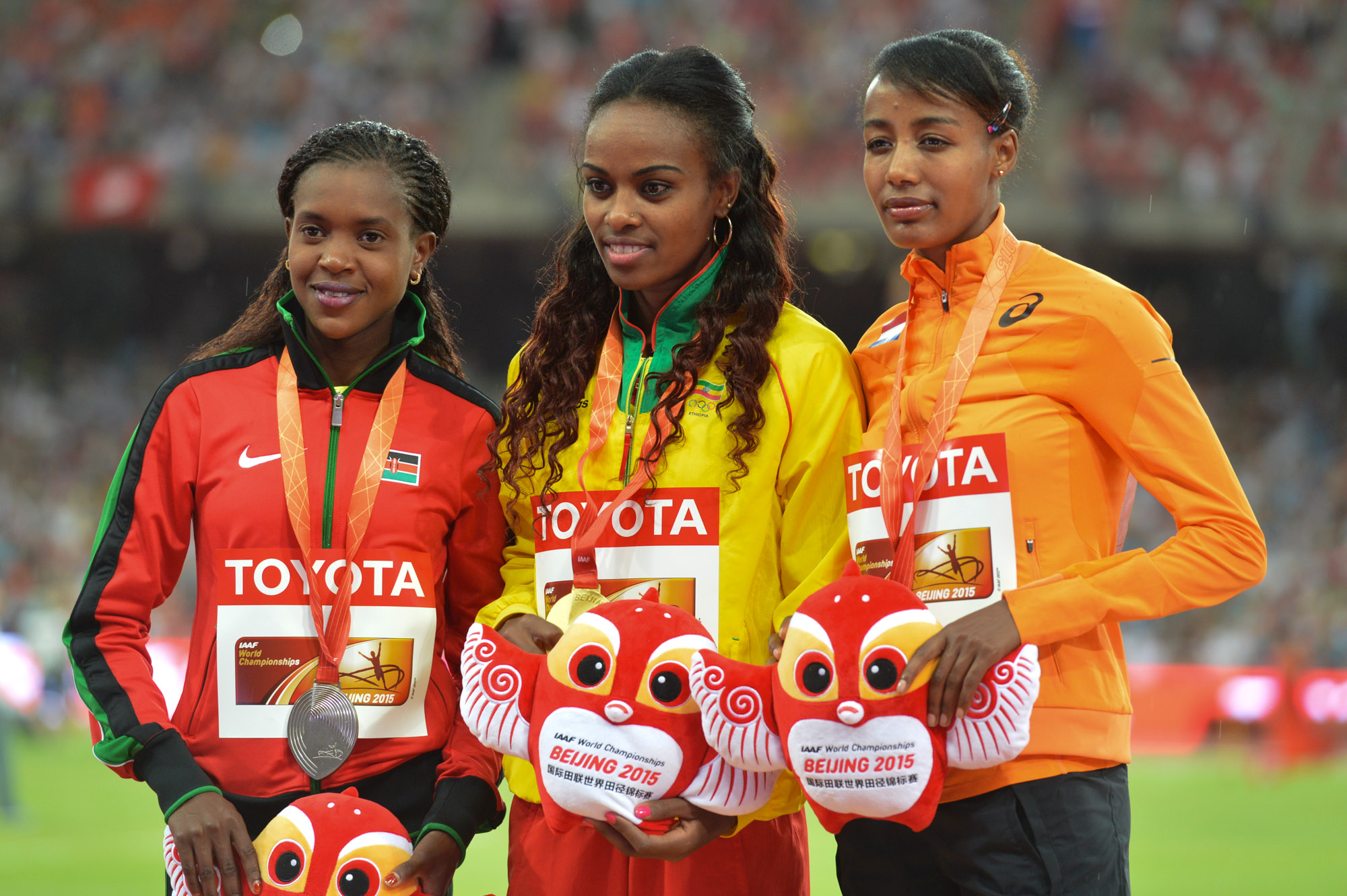
Genzebe (center) with Faith Kipyegon (L) and Sifan Hassan (R) at the medal ceremony during the 2015 World Championships in Beijing

At the World Championships in Beijing, she took the 1500 m title and claimed the bronze medal in the 5000 m event.

She was named the IAAF women's World Athlete of the Year for 2015.

=== 2016 ===
In February 2016, Genzebe competed in Stockholm's Globen Galan meeting. She ran the indoor mile in 4 minutes and 13.31 seconds, breaking Doina Melinte's 26-year-old world record of 4:17.14, which had been set in 1990. In April, she pulled out of the Dubai Athletics President's Cup 10,000 m Olympic qualifier race due to an injury in her left foot. In a track meet in Barcelona on 30 June, she failed to finish a 5000 m race due to an injury. She was removed from the track in a wheelchair.

At the 2016 Rio Olympics, Dibaba ran the women's 1500 m. She won her heat (one out of 3) in 4:10.61. In the semifinals (one out of 2) she was the fastest runner with 4.03.06. The final was won by Faith Kipyegon in a time of 4:08.92. Genzebe took the silver medal in a time of 4:10.27 and Jenny Simpson placed third with 4:10.53.

=== 2017 ===
Genzebe broke the 2000 m indoor world record and also the absolute world record, because it lowered the outdoor mark as well, on 7 February 2017 in Sabadell (Spain). She ran the distance in 5:23.75, an improvement on the former indoor best by Gabriela Szabo from 1998 by 6 seconds. The outdoor world record was set by Sonia O'Sullivan with 5:25.36.

An illness prevented her from running in her usual form at the 2017 World Athletics Championships, where she finished 12th in the 1500 metres. and later pulled off from the 5000 m event.

Since September she was coached by Hussein Shibo and Tolera Dinka.

=== 2018 ===
At the 2018 IAAF World Indoor Championships in Birmingham, she won the 1500 m and the 3000 m.

=== 2019 ===
Genzebe won the Golden Gala 1500 m in Rome on 6 June in a time of 3:56.28. She went to Rabat on 16 June and took victory over the distance in 3:55.47.

In the 1500 m Diamond League Final on 29 August in Zürich, Genzebe finished fourth in 4:00.86. The final was won by Sifan Hassan in 3:57.08, Konstanze Klosterhalfen was the runner up with 3:59.02 and Gabriela DeBues-Stafford placed third in 3:59.59.

=== 2020–2022 ===
In her first race of any kind since August 2019, Genzebe won the delayed Valencia Half Marathon in December 2020 with a time of 65:18. It was the fastest half marathon debut by a woman in history at the time.

On 16 October 2022, she debuted in the marathon at the Amsterdam Marathon, placing second behind Almaz Ayana with a time of 2:18:05, a performance which ranked her in the world all-time top 20.

== Achievements ==
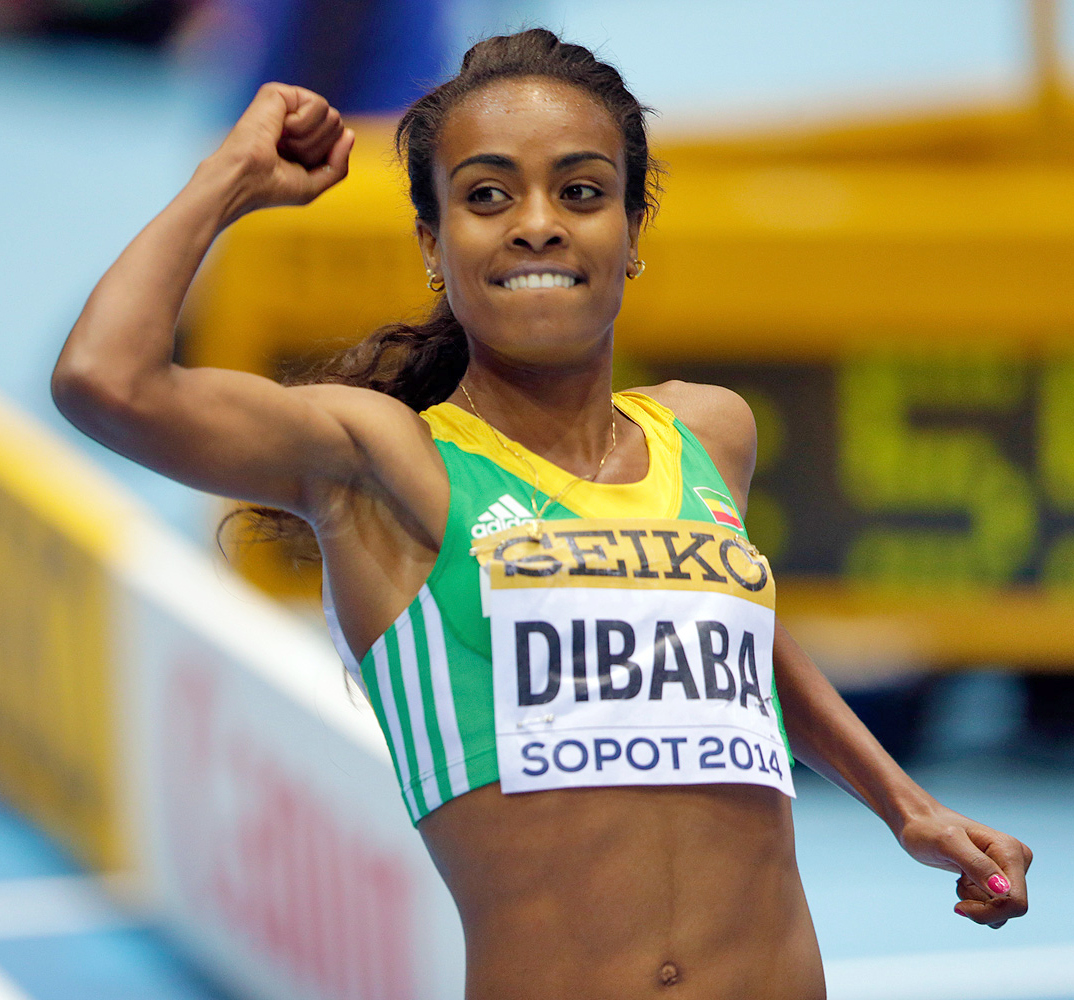
Genzebe at the 2014 World Indoor Championships in Sopot

All information taken from World Athletics profile.

=== Personal bests ===
Type	Event	Time	Date	Place	Record
Outdoor track	800 metres	1:59.37	5 May 2017	Doha, Qatar	
Outdoor track	1500 metres	3:50.07	17 July 2015	Monaco	NR
Outdoor track	Mile	4:14.30	6 September 2016	Rovereto, Italy	NR
Outdoor track	2000 metres	5:27.50	17 June 2014	Ostrava, Czech Republic	
Outdoor track	3000 metres	8:21.29	30 June 2019	Palo Alto, United States	
Outdoor track	5000 metres	14:15.41	4 July 2015	Paris, France	
Indoor	1000 metres	2:33.06	24 February 2017	Madrid, Spain	NR
Indoor	1500 metres	3:55.17	1 February 2014	Karlsruhe, Germany	
Indoor	Mile	4:13.31	17 February 2016	Stockholm, Sweden	WR
Indoor	2000 metres	5:23.75	7 February 2017	Sabadell, Spain	WB
Indoor	3000 metres	8:16.60	6 February 2014	Stockholm, Sweden	WR
Indoor	Two miles	9:00.48	15 February 2014	Birmingham, England	WB
Indoor	5000 metres	14:18.86	19 February 2015	Stockholm, Sweden	WR
Road	Half marathon	1:05:18	6 December 2020	Valencia, Spain	
Road	Marathon	2:18:05	16 October 2022	Amsterdam, Netherlands	

=== International competitions ===
Representing Ethiopia
Year	Competition	Venue	Position	Event	Notes
2007	World Cross Country Championships	Mombasa, Kenya	5th	Junior race (6 km)	21:23
2008	World Cross Country Championships	Edinburgh, United Kingdom	1st	Junior race (6 km)	19:59
2008	World Junior Championships	Bydgoszcz, Poland	2nd	5000 m	16:16.75
2009	World Cross Country Championships	Amman, Jordan	1st	Junior race (6 km)	20:14
2009	African Junior Championships	Bambous, Mauritius	1st	5000 m	16:11.85
2009	World Championships	Berlin, Germany	8th	5000 m	15:11.12
2010	World Cross Country Championships	Bydgoszcz, Poland	11th	Junior race (6 km)	19:21
2010	World Junior Championships	Moncton, Canada	1st	5000 m	15:08.06
2011	World Cross Country Championships	Punta Umbría, Spain	9th	Senior race (8 km)	25:36
2011	World Championships	Daegu, South Korea	8th	5000 m	15:09.35
2012	World Indoor Championships	Istanbul, Turkey	1st	1500 m i	4:05.78
2012	Olympic Games	London, United Kingdom	22nd (h)	1500 m	4:11.15
2013	World Championships	Moscow, Russia	7th	1500 m	4:05.99
2014	World Indoor Championships	Sopot, Poland	1st	3000 m i	8:55.04
2014	African Championships	Marrakesh, Morocco	2nd	5000 m	15:42.16
2014	Continental Cup	Marrakesh, Morocco	1st	3000 m	8:57.53
2015	World Championships	Beijing, China	1st	1500 m	4:08.09
2015	World Championships	Beijing, China	3rd	5000 m	14:44.14
2016	World Indoor Championships	Portland, United States	1st	3000 m i	8:47.43
2016	Olympic Games	Rio de Janeiro, Brazil	2nd	1500 m	4:10.27
2017	World Cross Country Championships	Kampala, Uganda	2nd	Mixed relay (8 km)	22:30
2017	World Championships	London, United Kingdom	12th	1500 m	4:06.72
2018	World Indoor Championships	Birmingham, United Kingdom	1st	1500 m i	4:05.27
2018	World Indoor Championships	Birmingham, United Kingdom	1st	3000 m i	8:45.05

=== Circuit wins and titles ===
- Diamond League Overall winner 5000 m: 2015
  - 2012 (1) 1500 m: Shanghai Diamond League (MR NR)
  - 2013 (1) 5000 m: Shanghai
  - 2014 (2) 5000 m: Rome Golden Gala, Monaco Herculis
  - 2015 [4]: (3) 5000 m: Eugene Prefontaine Classic (MR), Oslo Bislett Games, Meeting de Paris (MR); (1) 1500 m: Monaco (DLR WR)
  - 2016 (1) 3000 m: Lausanne Athletissima
  - 2017 [2]: (1) 5000 m: Eugene; (1) One mile: Lausanne (MR)
  - 2018 (1) 5000 m: Eugene
  - 2019 (2) 1500 m: Rome, Rabat Meeting (MR)

Records
Preceded by Qu Yunxia	Women's 1500 m world record holder July 17, 2015 – June 2, 2023	Succeeded by Faith Kipyegon
Preceded by Yelena Soboleva	Women's 1500 m world indoor record holder February 1, 2014 – February 9, 2021	Succeeded by Gudaf Tsegay
Preceded by Meseret Defar	Women's 3000 m world indoor record holder February 6, 2014 – present	Succeeded by Incumbent
Preceded by Meseret Defar	Women's 5000 m world indoor record holder February 19, 2015 – present	Succeeded by Incumbent
Awards
Preceded by Missy Franklin	Laureus World Sportswoman of the Year; 2015	Succeeded by Serena Williams
Preceded by Valerie Adams	IAAF World Athlete of the Year; 2015	Succeeded by Almaz Ayana
Preceded by Anita Włodarczyk	Women's Track & Field Athlete of the Year; 2015	Succeeded by Anita Włodarczyk
