= Sifan Hassan =

Dutch middle- and long-distance runner (born 1993)

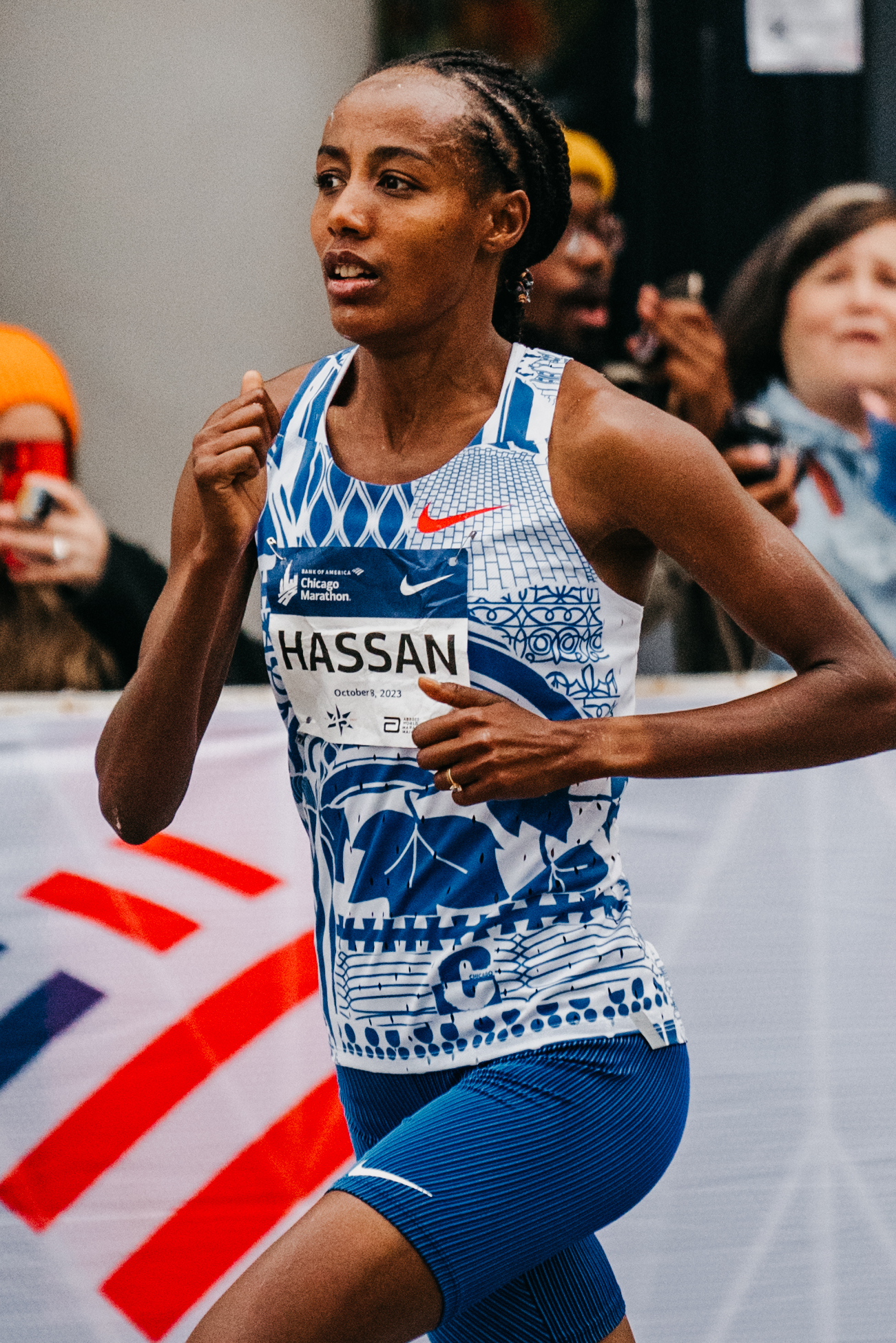
- Hassan at the 2023 Chicago Marathon

Personal information
- Nationality: Dutch; Ethiopian
- Born: 1 January 1993 (age 33) Adama, Ethiopia
- Agent: Yvonne Van Haperen, Global Sports Communication
- Height: 1.70 m (5 ft 7 in)
- Weight: 49 kg (108 lb)

Sport
- Country: Netherlands
- Sport: Athletics
- Events: Middle-, long-distance running
- Coached by: Tim Rowberry

Achievements and titles
- Olympic finals: 2016 Rio de Janeiro; 800 m, h (21st); 1500 m, 5th; 2020 Tokyo; 1500 m, Bronze; 5000 m, Gold; 10,000 m, Gold; 2024 Paris; 5000 m, Bronze; 10,000 m, Bronze; Marathon, Gold
- World finals: 2015 Beijing; 800 m, sf (9th); 1500 m, Bronze; 2017 London; 1500 m, 5th; 5000 m, Bronze; 2019 Doha; 1500 m, Gold; 10,000 m, Gold; 2022 Eugene; 5000 m, 6th; 10,000 m, 4th; 2023 Budapest; 1500 m, Bronze; 5000 m, Silver; 10,000 m, 11th
- Highest world ranking: No. 1 (overall, 2019); No. 1 (1500 m, 2019); No. 1 (5000 m, 2019); No. 1 (10,000 m, 2019); No. 1 (road running, 2019); No. 1 (marathon, 2025)
- Personal bests: 800 m: 1:56.81 (2017); 1500 m: 3:51.95 (2019, AR); Mile: 4:12.33 (2019, AR); 3000 m: 8:18.49 (2019, AR); 5000 m: 14:13.42 (2023, AR); 10,000 m: 29:06.82 (2021, AR); Indoors; 1500 m: 4:00.46 i (2015, NR); Mile: 4:19.89 i (2017, NR); 3000 m: 8:30.74 i (2017, NR); Road; 5 km: 14:44 (2019); Half marathon: 1:05:15 (2018, AR); Marathon: 2:13:44 (2023, AR)
Medal record
Women's athletics
Representing the Netherlands
Olympic Games
Gold medal – first place	2020 Tokyo	5000 m
Gold medal – first place	2020 Tokyo	10,000 m
Gold medal – first place	2024 Paris	Marathon
Bronze medal – third place	2020 Tokyo	1500 m
Bronze medal – third place	2024 Paris	5000 m
Bronze medal – third place	2024 Paris	10,000 m
World Championships
Gold medal – first place	2019 Doha	1500 m
Gold medal – first place	2019 Doha	10,000 m
Silver medal – second place	2023 Budapest	5000 m
Bronze medal – third place	2015 Beijing	1500 m
Bronze medal – third place	2017 London	5000 m
Bronze medal – third place	2023 Budapest	1500 m
World Indoor Championships
Gold medal – first place	2016 Portland	1500 m
Silver medal – second place	2018 Birmingham	3000 m
Bronze medal – third place	2018 Birmingham	1500 m
Diamond League
First place	2015	1500 m
First place	2019	1500 m
First place	2019	5000 m
European Championships
Gold medal – first place	2014 Zürich	1500 m
Gold medal – first place	2018 Berlin	5000 m
Silver medal – second place	2014 Zürich	5000 m
Silver medal – second place	2016 Amsterdam	1500 m
European Indoor Championships
Gold medal – first place	2015 Prague	1500 m
European Cross Country Championships
Gold medal – first place	2013 Belgrad	U23 race
Gold medal – first place	2015 Hyères	Senior race
Continental Cup
Representing Europe
Gold medal – first place	2014 Marrakech	1500 m
Gold medal – first place	2018 Ostrava	3000 m
World Marathon Majors
Gold medal – first place	2023 London	Marathon
Gold medal – first place	2023 Chicago	Marathon
Gold medal – first place	2025 Sydney	Marathon
Bronze medal – third place	2025 London	Marathon

Sifan Hassan (Oromo: Siifan Hassan; born January 1993 in Ethiopia) is an Ethiopian-Dutch middle- and long-distance runner. She is most recognized for her versatility in running championship and world-leading performances in widely disparate distances. She completed an unprecedented triple at the 2020 Tokyo Olympics, winning gold medals in both the 5,000 metres and 10,000 metres and a bronze medal for the 1,500 metres. Hassan is the only athlete in Olympic history to win medals across a middle-distance event and both long-distance races in a single Games. She is only the second of three women to complete an Olympic distance double. At the Paris 2024 Olympics, Hassan secured a bronze medal in both the women's 5,000 m and 10,000 m events and gold in the women's marathon, becoming the only woman to win the Olympic gold medal in the 5,000 metres, 10,000 metres and Marathon races.

At the World Athletics Championships, Hassan took 1,500 m and 10,000 m titles in 2019, becoming the only athlete (male or female) in history to win both events at a single World Championships or Olympic Games. She won a bronze at the 1500 m in 2015, and at the 5000 m in 2017, when she also finished fifth in the 1,500 m. Hassan is a three-time World Indoor Championships medallist, winning gold at 1500 m in 2016 as well as silver at 3000 m and bronze for 1500 m in 2018. She earned six European medals (including two cross country titles), and one European indoor medal. She is also a three-time Diamond League winner, having secured the 1500 m/5000 m double in 2019. In her debut over the classic 26.2-mile distance, she won the 2023 London Marathon.

Hassan has been the world record holder for the one hour run since 2020. She held the world record for the one mile on the track from July 2019 to July 2023, when Faith Kipyegon overtook it. She held a world record at 10,000 m for two days in June 2021. She holds six European records (1500 m, 3000 m, 5000 m, 10,000 m, half marathon, marathon) and three other Dutch records.

== Early life ==
Hassan was born in Adama, Oromia, Ethiopia and raised in the countryside of Kersa in the Munesa district of the Arsi Zone of Oromia. She was a recreational runner there. She left her home country as a refugee and arrived in the Netherlands in 2008 at age 15. She began running while undertaking studies to become a nurse. She is an Arsi Oromo.

Hassan became a Dutch citizen in 2013.

== Career ==
=== 2011–2012 ===
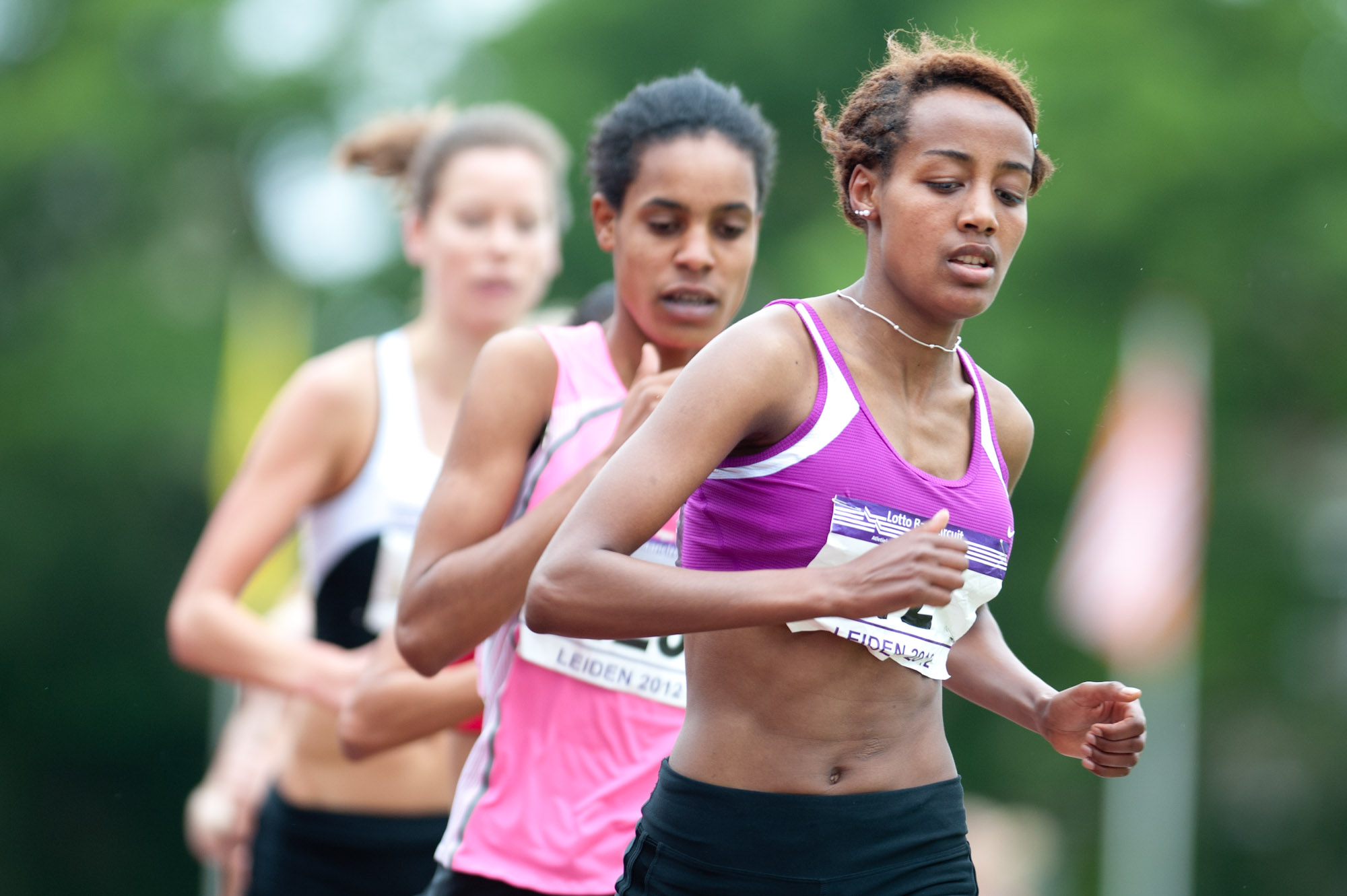
Hassan (right) at the 2012 Gouden Spike meeting held in Leiden, Netherlands.

She got her first spikes and kit from Yke Schouwstra. After she moved to Eindhoven, she met Ton van Hoesel who coached her for two years. In Arnhem, Hassan became a member of the Papendal national training centre for top athletes. She received her Dutch citizenship in 2013. Affiliated with Eindhoven Atletiek, Hassan entered the Eindhoven half marathon in 2011 and won the race with a time of 77:10 minutes. She was also runner-up at two cross country races (Sylvestercross and Mol Lotto Cross Cup). She won those races in 2012, as well as the 3000 m at the Leiden Gouden Spike meet.

=== 2013–2014 ===
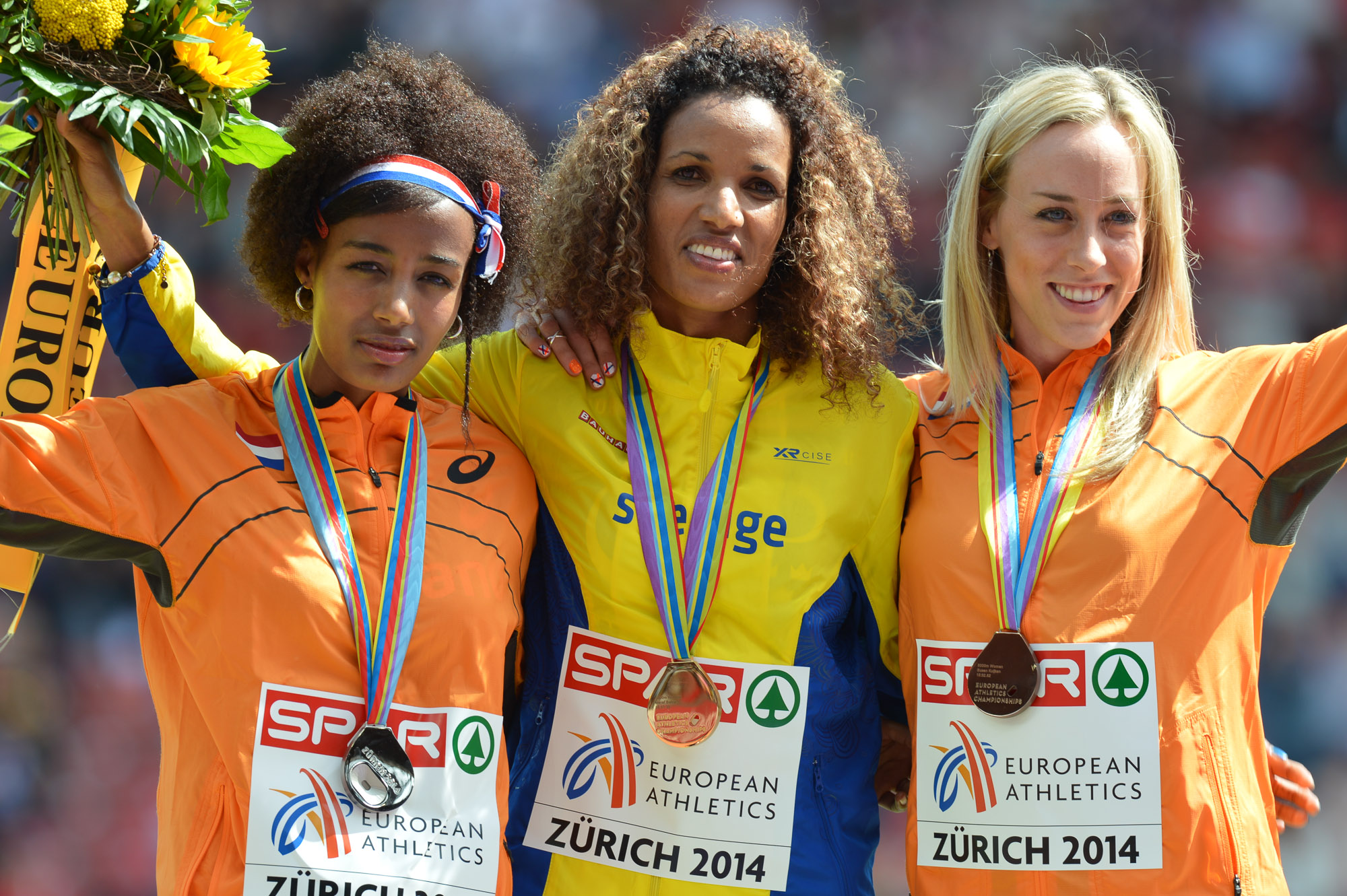
Hassan (left) with her silver medal for the 5,000 metres at the 2014 European Athletics Championships held in Zurich. She won her first European senior title at the event with a 1500 m victory.

Hassan made her breakthrough in the 2013 season. She ran an 800 metres best of 2:00.86 minutes to win at the KBC Night of Athletics and took wins in the 1500 m at the Nijmegen Global Athletics and Golden Spike Ostrava meets. On the 2013 IAAF Diamond League circuit she was runner-up in the 1500 m at Athletissima with a personal best of 4:03.73 minutes and was third at the DN Galan 3000 m with a best of 8:32.53 minutes—this time ranked her the fourth-fastest runner in the world that year.

Hassan became a Dutch citizen in November 2013, too late for competing at the 2013 World Championships, and the following month she made her first appearance for the Netherlands. At the 2013 European Cross Country Championships she won the gold medal in the under-23 category on a 6 km course in a time of 19:40 ahead of Amela Terzic and helped the Dutch team to third in the rankings. She also won the Warandeloop and Lotto Cross Cup Brussels races that winter.

At the beginning of 2014 she ran a world-leading time of 8:45.32 minutes for the 3000 m at the Weltklasse in Karlsruhe, then broke the Dutch indoor record in the 1500 m with a time of 4:05.34 minutes at the Birmingham Indoor Grand Prix. She ran her first sub-4 minute 1500 m in finishing fifth at the Prefontaine Classic in a time of 3:59.38. On 5 July, Hassan won the 1500 m at the Paris Diamond League and set another new personal best of 3:57.00. She followed it by winning at the Glasgow Grand Prix, holding off Abeba Aregawi. At the 2014 European Championships, Hassan won gold in the 1500 m and silver in the 5000 m. She ended her season by winning at the 2014 IAAF Continental Cup.

=== 2015 ===
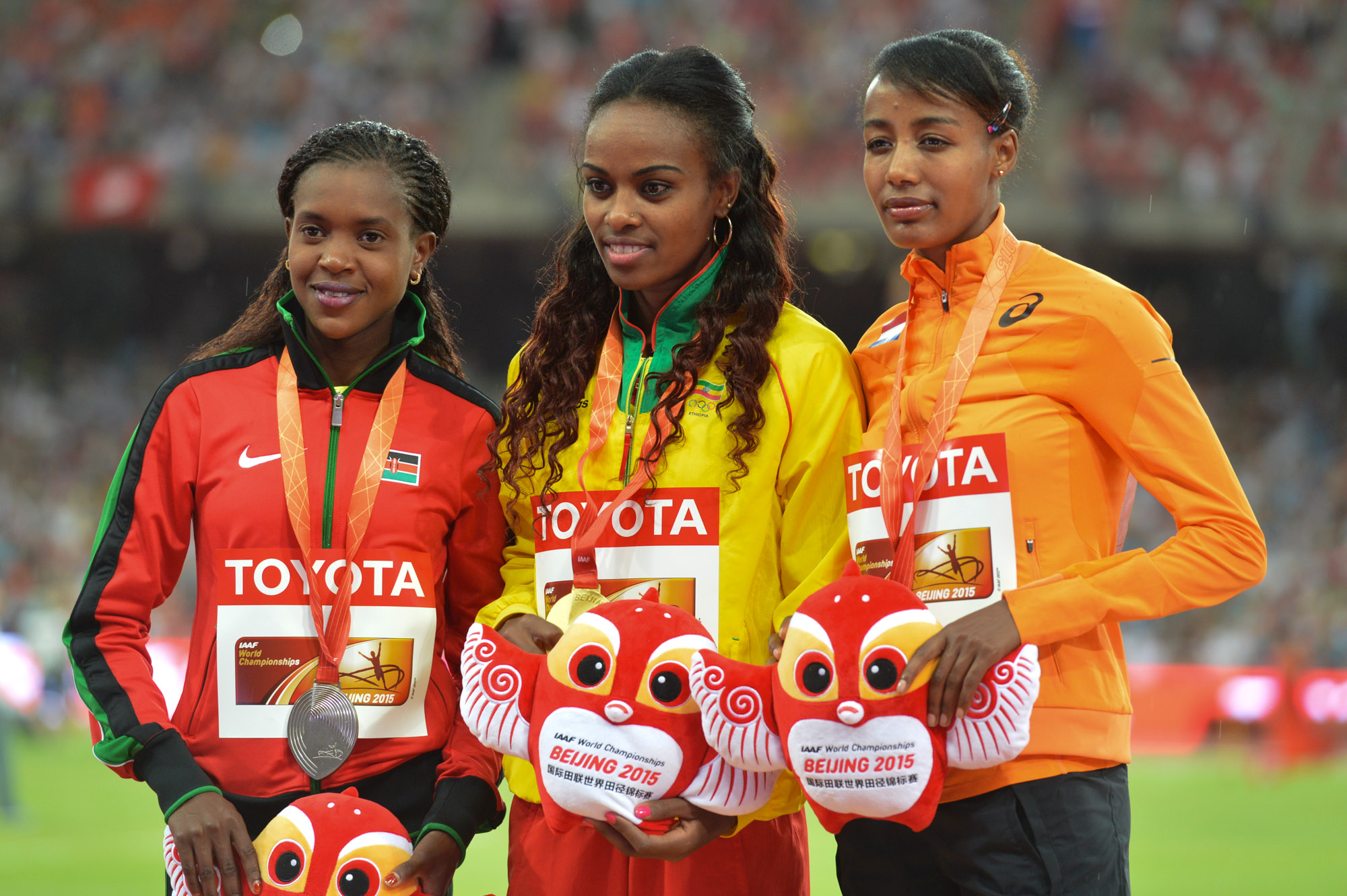
Women's 1,500 metres podium at the 2015 World Championships in Beijing. From left to right: Faith Kipyegon, Genzebe Dibaba and Sifan Hassan.

Hassan won gold in the 1500 m at the 2015 European Indoor Athletics Championships in Prague. She ran a new 1500 m national record of 3:56.05 at the Monaco Diamond League, she finished second behind Genzebe Dibaba who set a new world record. At the 2015 World Championships in Beijing, Hassan won the bronze medal in the 1500 metres, also making the semi-finals of the 800 m. She became the second female Dutch athlete ever to win a medal at the World Championships, after Dafne Schippers. She won gold in the senior race at the European Cross Country Championships. She was the third female Dutch winner in the event, following in the footsteps of fellow African migrants Hilda Kibet and Lornah Kiplagat.

=== 2016–2017 ===
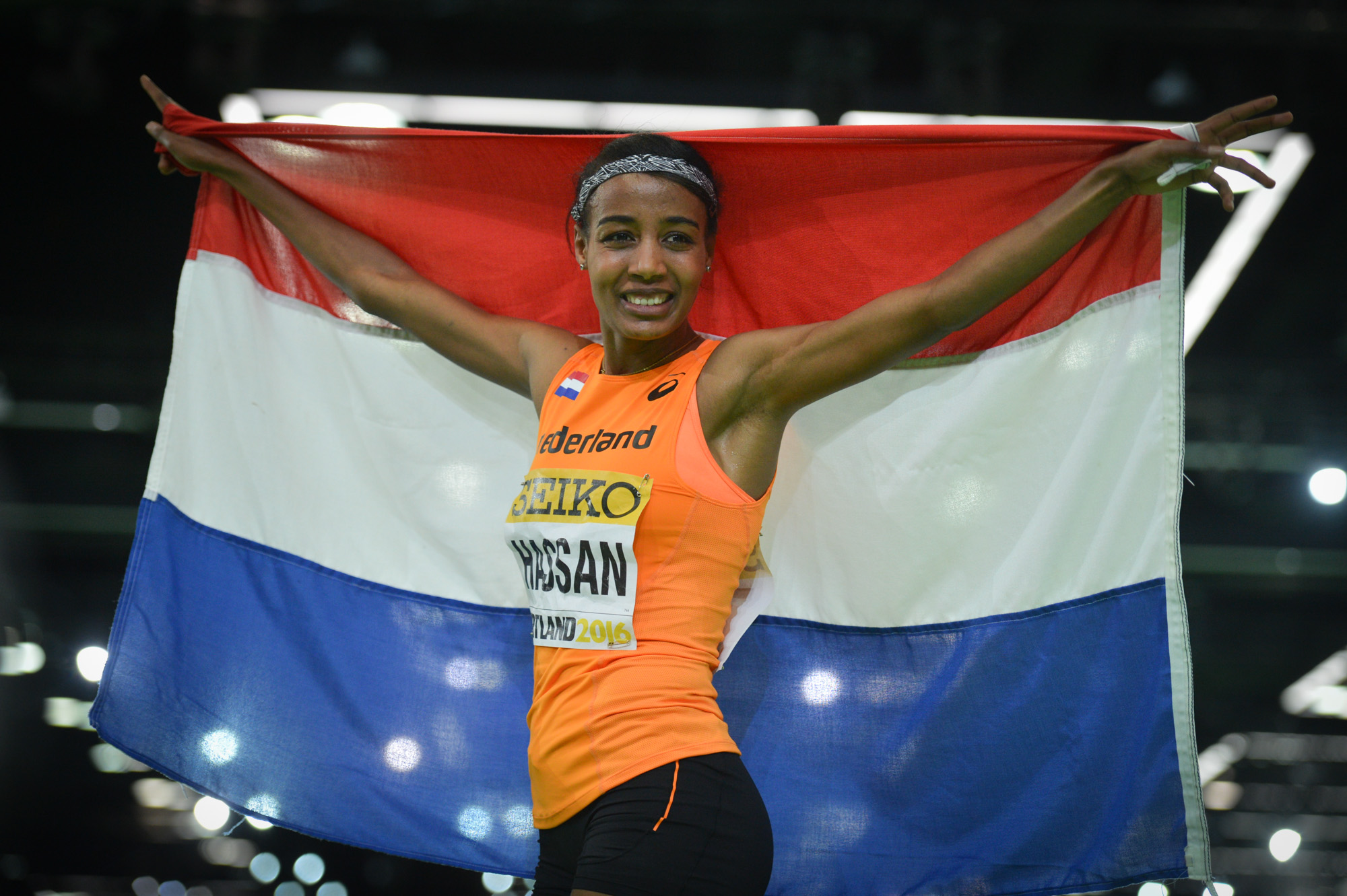
Hassan celebrates her 1,500 metres win and the first world title at the 2016 World Indoor Championships in Portland.

Hassan won gold in the 1500 m at the World Indoor Championships. She took silver in the same event in a slow, tactical race at the European Championships. She won her heat in the 1500 m in the 2016 Rio Olympics in 4:06.64 before Faith Kipyegon. In the semifinals she placed second in 4:03.62 after Genzebe Dibaba who won in 4:03.06. In the final Kipyegon took the Olympic gold medal with 4:08.92, Dibaba was the runner up with 4:10.27 and Jennifer Simpson took the bronze medal in 4:10.53. Hassan placed fifth in a time of 4:11.23.

She finished fifth in the 1500 m at the 2017 World Athletics Championships and won the bronze medal in the 5000 metres event.

=== 2018 ===
On 13 July, she broke the European record for 5000 metres by finishing second at the Rabat Diamond League in 14:22.34. A few days later, Hassan won the first Millicent Fawcett Mile at the 2018 London Anniversary Games in a time of 4:14.71, the fourth-fastest result at the time.

At the 2018 European Championships, she won a gold medal in the 5000 m with the time 14:46:12, setting a new championships record.

On 16 September, she broke the European record for the half marathon with a time of 65:15, winning the Copenhagen Half Marathon.

=== 2019 ===
On 17 February, Hassan set the world record for a 5 km road race stopping the clock at 14:44 in Monaco. It has since been broken, first by Beatrice Chepkoech, then by Ejgayehu Taye. The 5 km road race has been a world record event since 1 November 2017. At the Prefontaine Classic in June, she broke the European 3000 m record with a time of 8:18.49.

==== Mile world record ====
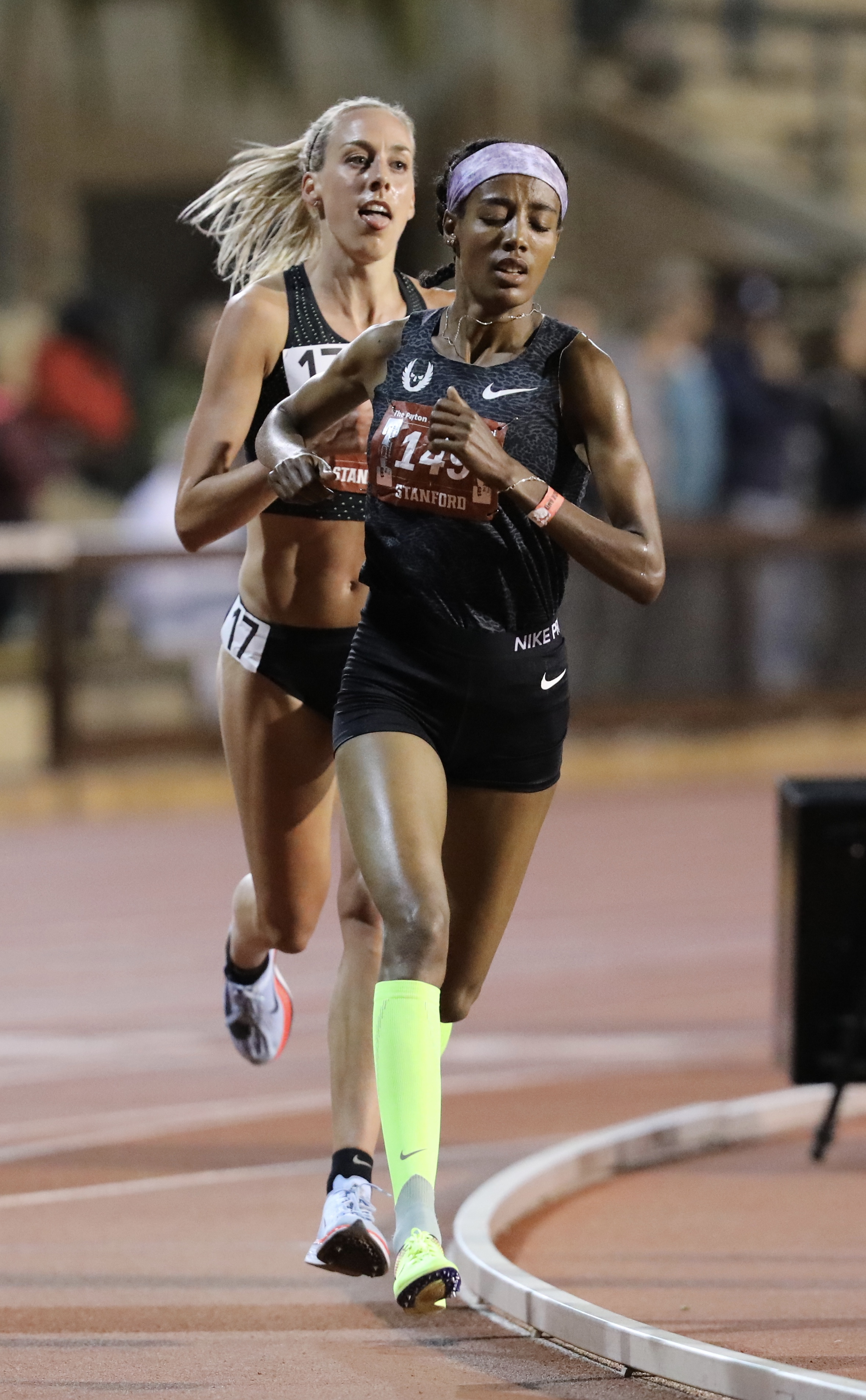
Hassan races 10,000 m at the Payton Jordan Invitational in Palo Alto, California, in 2019.

On 12 July, Hassan entered the mile run at the Herculis meet in Fontvieille, Monaco. Olha Lyakhova was the pace setter, taking the field through the first two laps (measured at the start line, not the quarter-mile splits) in 64.26 and 63.94 (2:08.20). As is typical for Hassan, she was last off the start line, but over the next 150 metres, slowly eased herself around the field on the outside into the marking position behind Lyakhova. Gabriela DeBues-Stafford soon moved through the field in between Hassan and Lyakhova for the next lap before Hassan and Gudaf Tsegay separated from the field as the only chasers. Between 800 and 1000 metres, Lyakhova strained to keep on pace, but Hassan and Tsegay were moving forward. After Lyakhova stepped out, the two found themselves 15 metres ahead of the pack. At 1200 metres, Hassan was looking back at her close chaser Tsegay in 3:10.13 (a 61.93 lap). Hassan accelerated, opening a 5-metre gap over the next 100 metres. Continuing at this pace, she passed 1500 metres in about 3:55. Hassan covered the last 409.344 metres in 62.20, her final time of 4:12:33 breaking Svetlana Masterkova's almost 23-year-old world record. The athletes trailing Hassan rewrote the all-time top 25 list, with Laura Weightman moving into position #15, DeBues-Stafford into #17, and after #5 all-time Tsegay faded into the pack she was followed by Rababe Arafi, Axumawit Embaye, Winnie Nanyondo and Ciara Mageean moving into positions #20–23.

She was the double 2019 Diamond League champion, winning both the 1500 and 5000 metres Trophies.

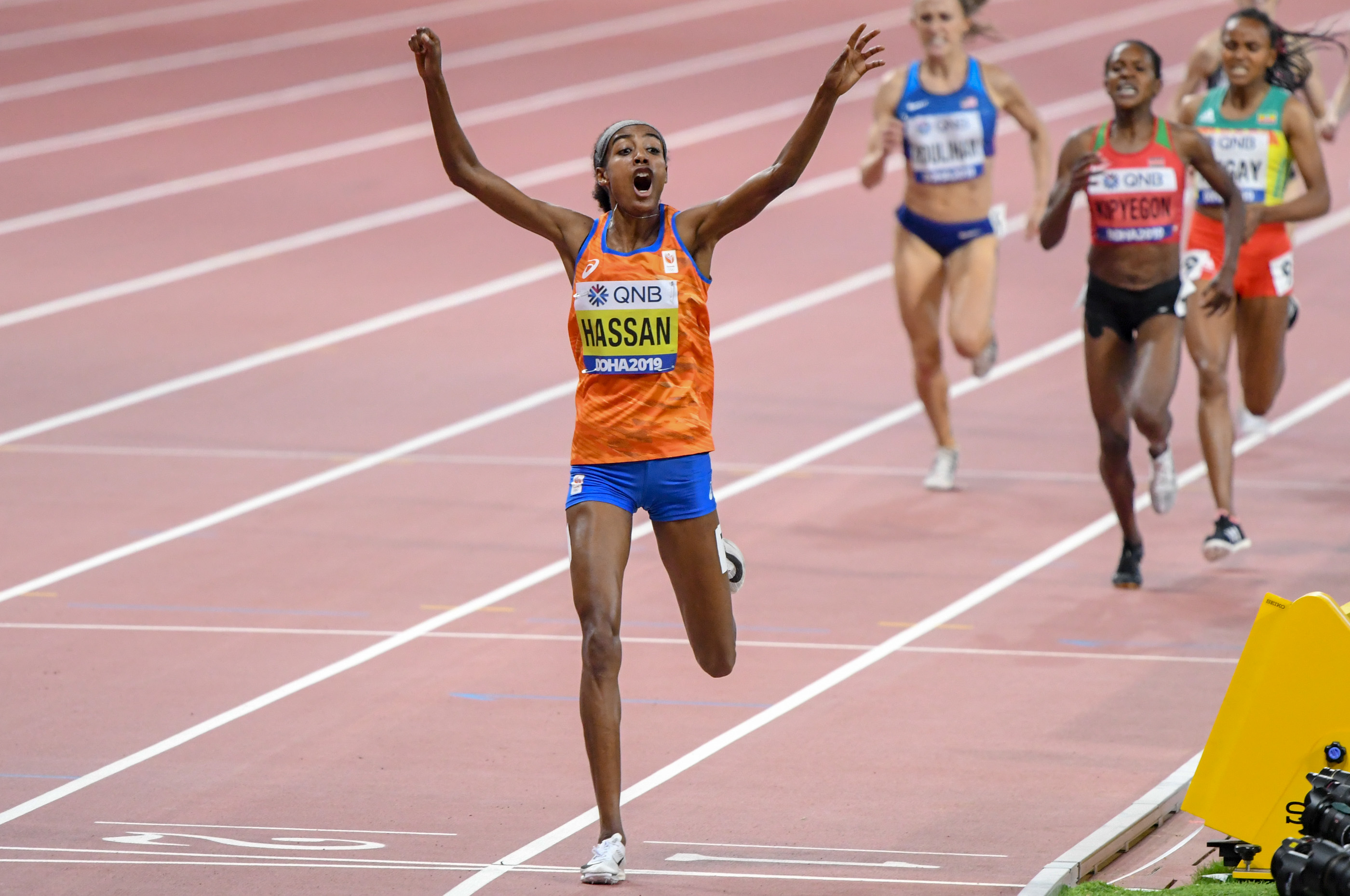
In the 1,500 m final of the 2019 Doha World Championships, Hassan defeated Faith Kipyegon.

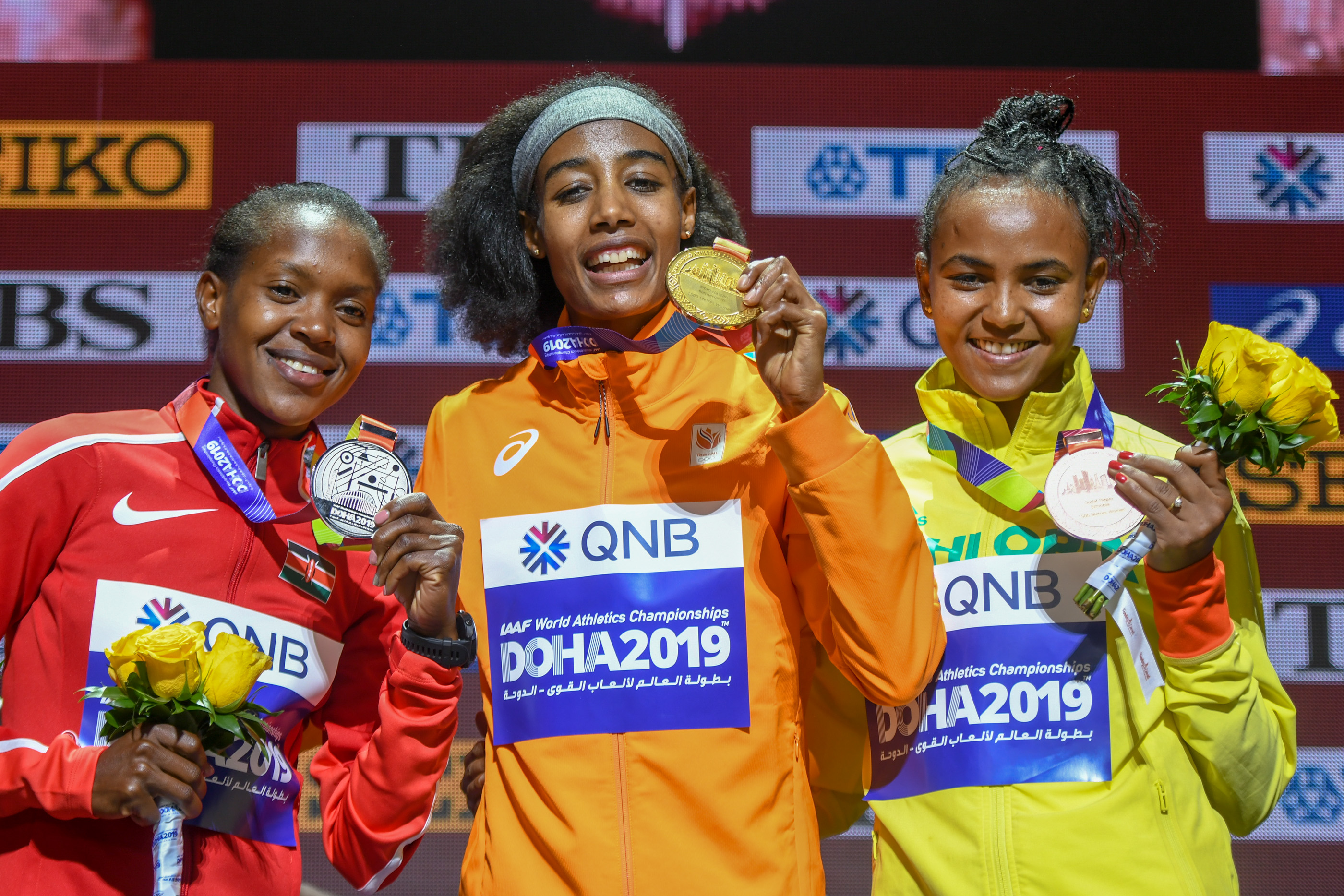
The fastest women in the world over the 1500 m at the 2019 World Athletics Championships. From left to right: Kipyegon, Hassan and Gudaf Tsegay.

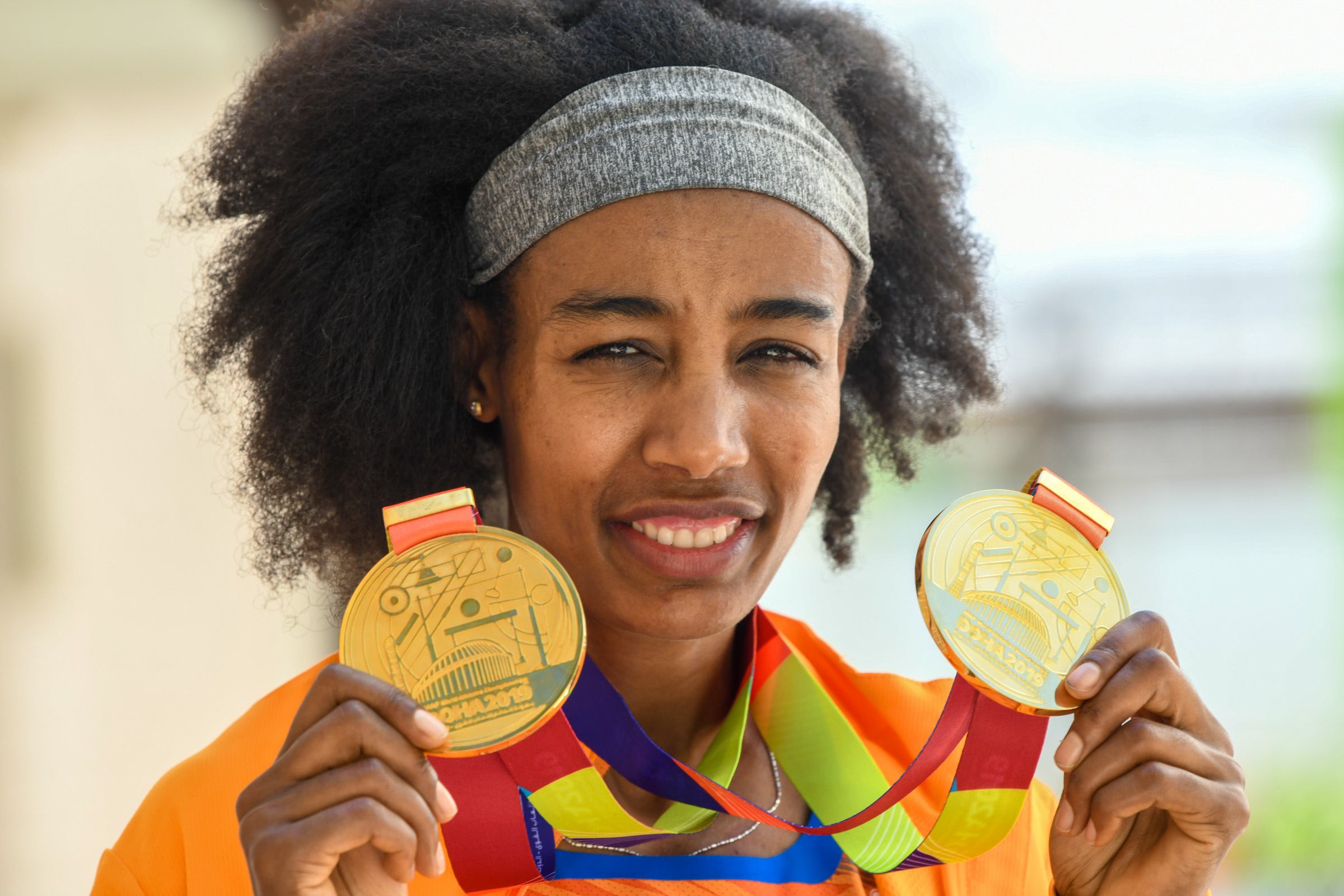
At the 2019 World Championships, Hassan completed the 1,500 m/10,000 m golden double, the first such in history of global championships.

On 28 September, she became the 2019 World Champion in the 10,000 metres in her second race for that distance. Her first race at the event was in Stanford in a time of 31:18.12, just fast enough to achieve the qualifying standard for the World Championships. The winning time of 30:17.62 was the best time of the year on the track. Alina Reh (Germany) led the field after 3000 m in 9:29.69. The front runner reached the halfway point in 15:32.70. Letesenbet Gidey finished in 30:21.23, with Agnes Tirop (Kenya) coming in third place in 30:25.50. The second half of the run was covered in 14:45. Hassan also won the 1500 metres race with a time of 3:51.95 (sixth place on the 1500 m all-time list), setting new championship and European records. The second-placed finisher was Faith Kipyegon in 3:54.22, a new Kenyan national record, and the third place went to Gudaf Tsegay with 3:54.38.

=== 2020–2021 ===
On 4 September 2020, Hassan set a new world record for the rarely run One hour run completing 18,930 metres at the Memorial van Damme in Brussels.

On 10 October, Hassan set a European record for the women's 10,000 metres in a time of 29:36.67, breaking the best set by Great Britain's Paula Radcliffe in 2002 by more than 24 seconds.

On 6 June 2021, she bettered her performance at the event to set a world record of 29:06.82 in Hengelo, beating the 2016 record of Ethiopian Almaz Ayana by more than 10 seconds. Hassan lost the record two days later, however, when Ethiopia's Letesenbet Gidey achieved a time of 29:01.03 at the same stadium. On 10 June, Hassan won the 1500 metres at the Rome Diamond League in a then world-leading time of 3:53.63. She then finished second at the Monaco Diamond League in a time of 3:53.60, finishing behind Faith Kipyegon who ran a new national record of 3:51.07.

Hassan won gold in the 5000 metres and 10,000 metres at the delayed 2020 Tokyo Olympic Games. She also won bronze in the 1500 metres. In her 1500 m, Hassan fell at the start of the final lap over Edinah Jebitok (Kenya). She still won the run. She became the only athlete ever to medal in the 1500, 5000, and 10,000 metres events at the same Olympics. Her 5000 m winning time was 14:36.79, ahead of Hellen Obiri from Kenya with 14:38.36, while Gudaf Tsegay won a bronze medal with a time of 14:38.87. Her gold medal win made her the first Dutch woman with an Olympic athletics medal in a long-distance event. Herr winning time in the 10000 m run was 29:55.32, Kalkidan Gezahegne (Bahrain) placed second in a time of 29:56.18 and Letensenbet Gidey (Ethiopia) placed third with 30:01.72. She was the first non-Kenyan or Ethiopian athlete to win the event since Gabriela Szabo won in the 2000 Sydney Olympics. She carried the flag of the Netherlands in the Olympics closing ceremony.

=== 2022 ===
This season was considered a resting year for Hassan. She ended a break from competing just 8 days before the World Championships in Eugene by running at the low-key Stumptown Twilight Meet in Portland where she won the 5000 metres in 15:13.41. At the aforementioned World Championships, Hassan finished sixth in the 5000 metres and fourth in the 10,000 metres.

=== 2023 ===
On 23 April, on her debut over the classic marathon distance, the 30-year-old won the London Marathon with a time of 2:18:33. She lost contact with the leaders after stopping to stretch her leg twice about 19 km into the race, and was 28 seconds behind at the 25 km mark. Despite this, Hassan caught up with the slowing lead quartet with four kilometres to go and prevailed in a sprint finish on the final straight, four seconds ahead of Alemu Megertu. "It was really amazing. I never thought I would finish a marathon", said Hassan.

On 3 June, just 41 days after her marathon debut, Hassan made her return to outdoor track at the FBK Games in Hengelo, Netherlands. She won both the 10,000 metres and the 1500 metres in 29:37.80 and 3:58.12, respectively. On 23 July, she ran a new area record over 5000 metres of 14:13.42 to finish third at the London Diamond League.

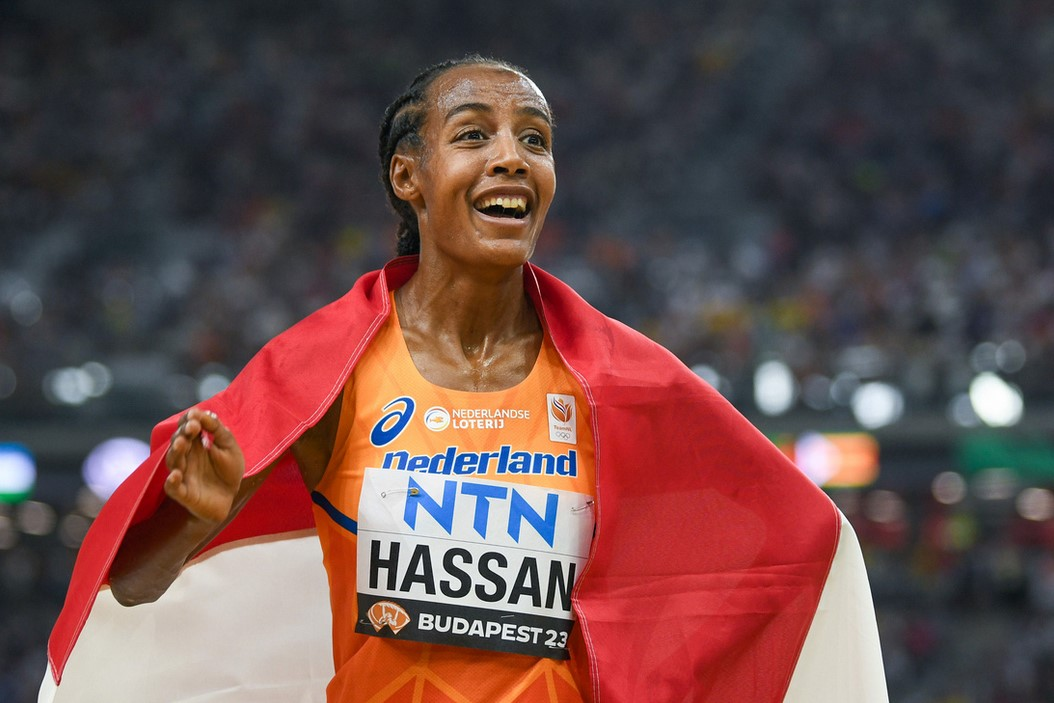
Hassan after winning silver over 5000 m at the 2023 World Championships.

At the 2023 World Championships, Hassan was leading the 10,000 metres until the final 100 m when she stumbled and fell after getting tangled with Gudaf Tsegay, she ended up finishing 11th. Hassan came back to win bronze in the 1500 metres and silver in the 5000 metres.

On 8 October, Sifan Hassan won the Chicago Marathon with a time of 2:13:44. This was a new course record for the Chicago Marathon as well as the second-fastest women's marathon of all time.

=== 2024 ===
On 3 March, Hassan finished fourth at the Tokyo Marathon in a time of 2:18.05. She opened her track season with a win over 5000 m at the Track Fest meet held in Los Angeles. Hassan placed a disappointing seventh over the same distance at the Prefontaine Classic.

At the Paris 2024 Olympics, Hassan secured the bronze medal in the women's 5,000 metres. Initially upgraded to silver following Faith Kipyegon's disqualification for obstruction, Hassan was later returned to bronze after Kipyegon was reinstated following Kenya's successful appeal.

Hassan also won bronze in the 10,000 metres then, on the final day, won gold in the women's marathon after sprinting the final 200 metres to beat Ethiopian Tigst Assefa (back than Marathon world record holder) by three seconds. At 28 km into the run, Hasan lost contact with the lead group. With 300 m go to, Hassan made a move on Assefa and won in an Olympic Record of 2:22:55 hours. Ethopia filed an unsuccessful protest against Hassan. With this gold medal she became the first woman to win Olympic gold in the marathon, 5,000 metres and 10,000 metres. She also became the first Olympic athlete male or female to win medals in these three events at the same Games since Czechoslovak Emil Zátopek in 1952.

In December 2024, Hassan was named World Athletics Female Athlete of the Year. She was the first Dutchwoman to win the award.

=== 2025 ===
On 25 April 2026, Hassan ran the 2025 London marathon and placed third in a time of 2:19:00. The race was won by Tigst Assefa (Ethopia) in a time of 2:15:50 and a women's only world record, an improvement by 26 seconds. Joyciline Jepksogei (Kenya) placed second in a time of 2:18:44.

Hassan won the newly World Marathon Major in Sydney on 31 August 2025, in a time of 2:18:22, with the former course record by Workenesh Edesa (Ethopia) 2:21:40. The half marathon mark was passed in 1:10:01, second came Brigid Kosgei (Kenya) in a time of 2:18:56 and Edesa in 2:22:15.

On 2 November 2025, Hassan placed 6th in the New York City Marathon in a time of 2:24:43. The run was won by Hellen Obiri (Kenya) in a time of 2:19:51 and her fellow countrymate Sharon Lokedia placing second in 2:20:07.

=== 2026 ===
Hassan was scheduled to run the 26 April 2026 London Marathon but withdrew because of an Achilles injury sustained when she ran on a treadmill.

=== Coach ===
Sifan Hassan achieved her first career breakthroughs while under the direction of Dutch national coach Honore Hoedt. Hassan decided to search for other coaching options at the end of 2016 after injuries hampered her buildup to the Rio Olympics.

Beginning in 2017, Hassan moved to the United States to be coached by Alberto Salazar at the Nike Oregon Project.

In July 2018, the Nike Oregon Project hired Tim Rowberry as a coach—primarily to oversee the training of Sifan Hassan and her fellow team member Yomif Kejelcha—while Salazar remained the head coach over all athletes in the Nike Oregon Project.

In October 2019 Salazar began serving a four-year ban from athletics for doping violations dating from before he started coaching Hassan. According to court rulings which upheld Salazar's ban, there was "no evidence put before the CAS as to any effect on athletes competing at the elite level within the Nike Oregon Project."

The aftermath of Salazar's ban caused the Nike Oregon Project to dissolve leading Hassan and Kejelcha to form a new training group under coach Tim Rowberry.

Hassan's current coach is Tim Rowberry. After her partnership with Rowberry began in 2018, she has set new personal best times in the 1500m, 3k, 5k, 10k, half marathon, and marathon. Hassan's training partner Yomif Kejelcha remained in the group until his departure to Adidas in 2021.

== Personal bests ==
Information from World Athletics profile unless otherwise noted.

Type	Event	Time (h:m:s)	Place	Date	Record	Notes
Outdoor	800 metres	1:56.81	Monaco, Monaco	21 July 2017		
Outdoor	1000 metres	2:34.68	Hengelo, Netherlands	24 May 2015	NR	
Outdoor	1500 metres	3:51.95	Doha, Qatar	5 October 2019	AR	
Outdoor	One mile	4:12.33	Monaco, Monaco	12 July 2019	AR	Also a world record until that was broken by Faith Kipyegon on 21 July 2023. Second-fastest woman of all time.
Outdoor	3000 metres	8:18.49	Stanford, CA, United States	30 June 2019	AR	
Outdoor	5000 metres	14:22.12	London, United Kingdom	21 July 2019	AR	
Outdoor	10,000 metres	29:06.82	Hengelo, Netherlands	6 June 2021	AR	Also a world record until that was broken by Letesenbet Gidey on 8 June 2021.
Outdoor	One hour	18,930 m	Brussels, Belgium	4 September 2020	WR	
Indoor	800 metres	2:02.62 i	Apeldoorn, Netherlands	28 February 2016		
Indoor	1500 metres	4:00.46 i	Stockholm, Sweden	19 February 2015	NR	
Indoor	One mile	4:19.89 i	New York, NY, United States	11 February 2017	NR	
Indoor	3000 metres	8:30.76 i	Birmingham, United Kingdom	18 February 2017	NR	
Road	5 km	14:44 Wo	Monaco, Monaco	17 February 2019		Also a world record until Beatrice Chepkoech broke the overall record on 14 February 2021 and Senbere Teferi broke the women's-only-race record on 12 September 2021.
Road	10 km	34:28	Brunssum, Netherlands	1 April 2012		
Road	15 km	53:57	's-Heerenberg, Netherlands	4 December 2011		
Road	Half marathon	65:15	Copenhagen, Denmark	16 September 2018	AR	
Road	Marathon	2:13:44	Chicago, United States	8 October 2023	AR	Third-fastest woman of all time

== Competition results ==
Information from World Athletics profile unless otherwise noted.

=== International competitions ===
Year	Competition	Venue	Position	Event	Result	Notes
Representing Netherlands
2013	European Cross Country Championships	Belgrade, Serbia	1st	U23 race	19:40	
2013	European Cross Country Championships	Belgrade, Serbia	3rd	U23 team	70 pts	
2014	World Indoor Championships	Sopot, Poland	5th	3000 m i	9:03.22	
2014	European Team Championships, Super League	Braunschweig, Germany	1st	3000 m	8:45.24	CR
2014	European Championships	Zürich, Switzerland	1st	1500 m	4:04.18	
2014	European Championships	Zürich, Switzerland	2nd	5000 m	15:31.79	
2014	Continental Cup	Marrakesh, Morocco	1st	1500 m	4:05.99	
2015	European Indoor Championships	Prague, Czech Republic	1st	1500 m i	4:09.04	
2015	World Championships	Beijing, China	sf (5th)	800 m	1:58.50	PB
2015	World Championships	Beijing, China	3rd	1500 m	4:09.34	
2015	European Cross Country Championships	Hyères, France	1st	Senior race	25:47	
2016	World Indoor Championships	Portland, OR, United States	1st	1500 m i	4:04.96	
2016	European Championships	Amsterdam, Netherlands	2nd	1500 m	4:33.76	
2016	Olympic Games	Rio de Janeiro, Brazil	h (21st)	800 m	2:00.27	SB
2016	Olympic Games	Rio de Janeiro, Brazil	5th	1500 m	4:11.23	
2017	World Championships	London, United Kingdom	5th	1500 m	4:03.34	
2017	World Championships	London, United Kingdom	3rd	5000 m	14:42.73	
2018	World Indoor Championships	Birmingham, United Kingdom	3rd	1500 m i	4:07.26	
2018	World Indoor Championships	Birmingham, United Kingdom	2nd	3000 m i	8:45.68	SB
2018	European Championships	Berlin, Germany	1st	5000 m	14:46.12	CR
2018	Continental Cup	Ostrava, Czech Republic	1st	3000 m	8:27.50	CR NR
2019	World Championships	Doha, Qatar	1st	1500 m	3:51.95	CR AR
2019	World Championships	Doha, Qatar	1st	10,000 m	30:17.62	WL PB
2021	Olympic Games	Tokyo, Japan	3rd	1500 m	3:55.86	
2021	Olympic Games	Tokyo, Japan	1st	5000 m	14:36.79	
2021	Olympic Games	Tokyo, Japan	1st	10,000 m	29:55.32	
2022	World Championships	Eugene, OR, United States	6th	5000 m	14:48.12	SB
2022	World Championships	Eugene, OR, United States	4th	10,000 m	30:10.56	SB
2023	World Championships	Budapest, Hungary	3rd	1500 m	3:56.00	
2023	World Championships	Budapest, Hungary	2nd	5000 m	14:54.11	
2023	World Championships	Budapest, Hungary	11th	10,000 m	31:53.35	
2024	Olympic Games	Paris, France	3rd	5000 m	14:30.61	SB
2024	Olympic Games	Paris, France	3rd	10,000 m	30:44.12	SB
2024	Olympic Games	Paris, France	1st	Marathon	2:22:55	OR
World Marathon Majors
2023	London Marathon	London, United Kingdom	1st	Marathon	2:18:33	NR
2023	Chicago Marathon	Chicago, United States	1st	Marathon	2:13:44	AR
2024	Tokyo Marathon	Tokyo, Japan	4th	Marathon	2:18:05	
2025	London Marathon	London, United Kingdom	3rd	Marathon	2:19:00	
2025	Sydney Marathon	Sydney, Australia	1st	Marathon	2:18:22	CR
2025	New York City Marathon	New York, USA	6th	Marathon	2:24:43	

=== Circuit wins and titles ===
- Diamond League Overall 1500 m winner: 2015
- Diamond League 1500 m champion: 2019
- Diamond League 5000 m champion: 2019
  - 2014 (2): Paris Meeting Areva (1500 m), Glasgow Grand Prix (1500 m)
  - 2015 (2): Birmingham British Grand Prix (1500 m), Lausanne Athletissima (1500 m)
  - 2017 (3): Rome Golden Gala (1500 m), Paris (1500 m), Birmingham (3000 m)
  - 2018 (2): London Anniversary Games (One mile), Birmingham (1500 m)
  - 2019 (4): Palo Alto Prefontaine Classic (3000 m), Monaco Herculis (One mile, MR DLR WR), Zürich Weltklasse (1500 m), Brussels Memorial Van Damme (5000 m)
  - 2020 (1): Brussels (One hour)
  - 2021 (3): Rome Golden Gala in Florence (1500 m), Eugene Prefontaine Classic (5000 m), Brussels (One mile)
  - 2022 (1): Chorzów Kamila Skolimowska Memorial (3000 m)

=== National titles ===
- Dutch Indoor Athletics Championships
  - 800 metres: 2016
  - 1500 metres: 2015

== Awards and honours ==
- Dutch Athlete of the Year: 2018, 2019, 2021
- Dutch Sportswoman of the Year: 2019, 2021, 2024
- Knight of the Order of Orange-Nassau: 2021
- European Athlete of the Year: 2021

Records
Preceded by Tatyana Kazankina	Women's 1,500m European record holder 5 October 2019 – present	Succeeded by Incumbent
Preceded by Svetlana Masterkova	Women's Mile World record holder 12 July 2019 – 21 July 2023	Succeeded by Faith Kipyegon
Preceded by Gabriela Szabo	Women's 3,000m European record holder 30 June 2019 – present	Succeeded by Incumbent
Preceded by Liliya Shobukhova	Women's 5,000m European record holder 13 July 2018 – present	Succeeded by Incumbent
Preceded by Almaz Ayana	Women's 10,000 m World record holder 6 June 2021 – 8 June 2021	Succeeded by Letesenbet Gidey
Preceded by Paula Radcliffe	Women's 10,000m European record holder 10 October 2020 – present	Succeeded by Incumbent
Preceded by Paula Radcliffe	Women's marathon European record holder 8 October 2023 – present	Incumbent
Awards
Preceded by Faith Kipyegon; Yulimar Rojas; Tigist Assefa	Women's World Athlete of the Year; 2024	Most recent
Preceded by Mariya Lasitskene	Women's European Athlete of the Year; 2021	Succeeded by Femke Bol
Preceded by Suzanne Schulting	Dutch Sportswoman of the Year; 2019, 2020/2021; 2024	Succeeded by Irene Schouten
Preceded by Femke Bol	Dutch Sportswoman of the Year; 2019, 2020/2021; 2024	Succeeded by Jessica Schilder
Preceded by Dafne Schippers; Menno Vloon	Dutch Athlete of the Year; 2018, 2019, 2021; 2024	Succeeded by Femke Bol
Preceded by Femke Bol	Dutch Athlete of the Year; 2018, 2019, 2021; 2024	Succeeded by Jessica Schilder
