= 2014 IAAF World Indoor Championships – Women's 3000 metres =

The women's 3000 metres at the 2014 IAAF World Indoor Championships took place on 7–9 March 2014.

== Medalists ==
Gold	Silver	Bronze
Genzebe Dibaba; Ethiopia	Hellen Onsando Obiri; Kenya	Maryam Yusuf Jamal; Bahrain

== Records ==
Standing records prior to the 2012 IAAF World Indoor Championships
World record	Genzebe Dibaba (ETH)	8:16.60	Stockholm, Sweden	6 February 2014
Championship record	Elly van Hulst (NED)	8:33.82	Budapest, Hungary	4 March 1989
World Leading	Genzebe Dibaba (ETH)	8:16.60	Stockholm, Sweden	6 February 2014
African record	Genzebe Dibaba (ETH)	8:16.60	Stockholm, Sweden	6 February 2014
Asian record	Dong Yanmei (CHN)	8:41.34	Lisbon, Portugal	10 March 2001
European record	Liliya Shobukhova (RUS)	8:27.86	Moscow, Russia	17 February 2006
North and Central American and Caribbean record	Shalane Flanagan (USA)	8:33.25	Boston, United States	27 January 2007
Oceanian Record	Kim Smith (NZL)	8:38.14	Boston, United States	27 January 2007
South American record	Letitia Vriesde (SUR)	9:07.08	The Hague, Netherlands	31 January 1993

== Qualification standards ==
Indoor	Outdoor
9:02.00	8:38.00 or 15:00.00 (5000 m)

== Schedule ==
Date	Time	Round
7 March 2014	11:25	Heats
9 March 2014	16:50	Final

== Results ==
=== Heats ===
Qualification: First 4 in each heat (Q) and the next 4 fastest (q) qualified for the final.

Rank	Heat	Name	Nationality	Time	Notes
1	2	Maryam Yusuf Jamal	Bahrain	8:53.07	Q
2	2	Hellen Onsando Obiri	Kenya	8:53.31	Q
DQ	2	Betlhem Desalegn	United Arab Emirates	~~8:53.56~~	Q
3	2	Hiwot Ayalew	Ethiopia	8:53.70	Q
4	2	Renata Pliś	Poland	8:57.80	q
5	1	Genzebe Dibaba	Ethiopia	8:57.86	Q
6	2	Gabriele Grunewald	United States	8:58.10	q
7	1	Sifan Hassan	Netherlands	8:58.50	Q
8	1	Margherita Magnani	Italy	8:58.51	Q
9	1	Shannon Rowbury	United States	8:58.85	Q, SB
10	1	Irene Jelagat	Kenya	8:58.97	q
11	1	Alia Saeed Mohammed	United Arab Emirates	9:00.35	q
12	1	Natalya Aristarkhova	Russia	9:09.37	
13	1	Lucy van Dalen	New Zealand	9:10.20	
DQ	2	Svitlana Shmidt	Ukraine	~~9:25.98~~	

=== Final ===
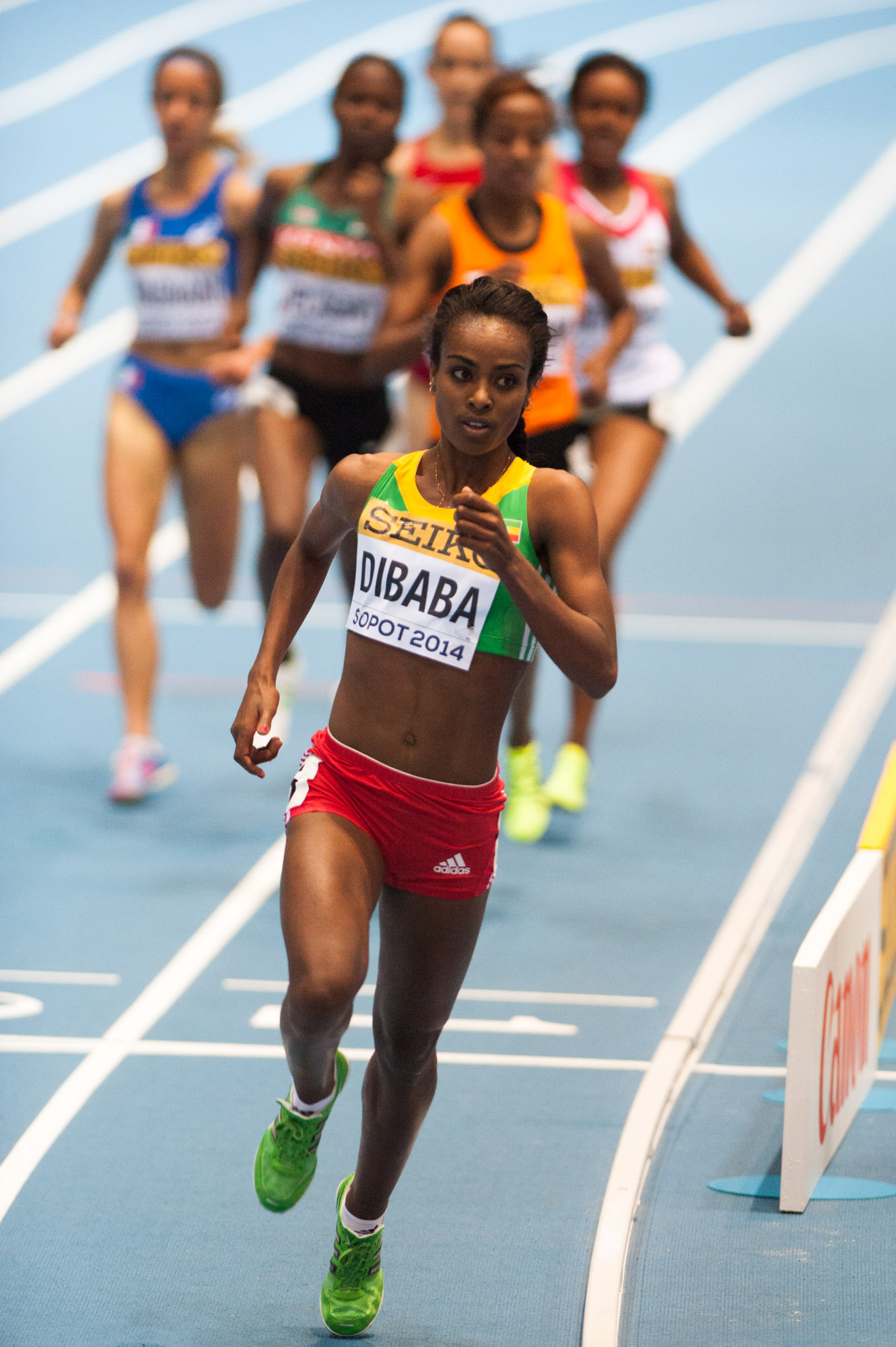
Genzebe Dibaba on her way to victory.

Rank	Name	Nationality	Time	Notes
1st place, gold medalist(s)	Genzebe Dibaba	Ethiopia	8:55.04	
2nd place, silver medalist(s)	Hellen Onsando Obiri	Kenya	8:57.72	
3rd place, bronze medalist(s)	Maryam Yusuf Jamal	Bahrain	8:59.16	
4	Irene Jelagat	Kenya	9:02.67	
5	Sifan Hassan	Netherlands	9:03.22	
DQ	Betlhem Desalegn	United Arab Emirates	~~9:04.06~~	
6	Renata Pliś	Poland	9:07.05	
7	Shannon Rowbury	United States	9:07.82	
8	Margherita Magnani	Italy	9:10.13	
9	Gabriele Grunewald	United States	9:11.76	
11	Hiwot Ayalew	Ethiopia	9:12.51	
12	Alia Saeed Mohammed	United Arab Emirates	9:21.23	
