= 2018 IAAF World Indoor Championships – Women's 3000 metres =

Women's 3000 metres at the 2018 IAAF World Indoor Championships
- Venue: Arena Birmingham
- Dates: 1 March
- Competitors: 14 from 11 nations
- Winning time: 8:45.05

Medalists
gold medal	Genzebe Dibaba	Ethiopia
silver medal	Sifan Hassan	Netherlands
bronze medal	Laura Muir	Great Britain

Video on YouTube Official Video

The women's 3000 metres at the 2018 IAAF World Indoor Championships took place on 1 March 2018.

== Summary ==
In the first running event at these championships, world record holder Genzebe Dibaba was back to defend her title, while none of the women she vanquished returned, though Laura Muir, Sifan Hassan and Meraf Bahta had beaten Dibaba in her outdoor 1500 meltdown from the previous year.

The race took off at a leisurely pace, with Muir taking the pack through a 1:15.31 first lap, marked by 5000 world champion Hellen Obiri. Hassan and Dibaba chose to lead from behind, taking the back of the pack. The next 400 was even slower, 1:20.45. With that, Konstanze Klosterhalfen tired of the slow pace and took the lead. With the injection of pace, Dibaba decided to move forward on the next straightaway to mid pack, then with a big acceleration on the next straightaway. As Dibaba passed, her teammate Fantu Worku popped out of the pack to tag along, both reaching a gap at the front behind Klosterhalfen. The third lap split was 1:12.23, but with the exchange in the lead it was considerably faster for Dibaba in particular. Obiri and Bahta wanted to tag along with Dibaba, pushing forward to her shoulder, while at the back Hassan moved up a few places as the field strung out. The next 400 was accomplished in 1:09.67. Just before 2000 meters, passed in 6:07.62 (a 1:08.96 split) Dibaba accelerated into the lead. That triggered Hassan to move forward. Klosterhalfen, Muir, Bahta and Worku attempted to hold on, but the only one to stay with Dibaba was Obiri at first. As Hassan accelerated past, Klosterhalfen and Muir followed her to bridge the gap. Dibaba ran the next 400 in 1:07.56. The pace was too much for Obiri as she broke, going backward through the field as Hassan and Muir chased a new gap by Dibaba. The gap widened as Dibaba laid down a 1:02.43 split. Through the final lap, Hassan gained slightly on Dibaba, but couldn't make enough progress. Dibaba coasted across the finish line with the win. Behind her Hassan let off the gas, while Muir launched a final kick, almost catching Hassan at the line.

== Results ==
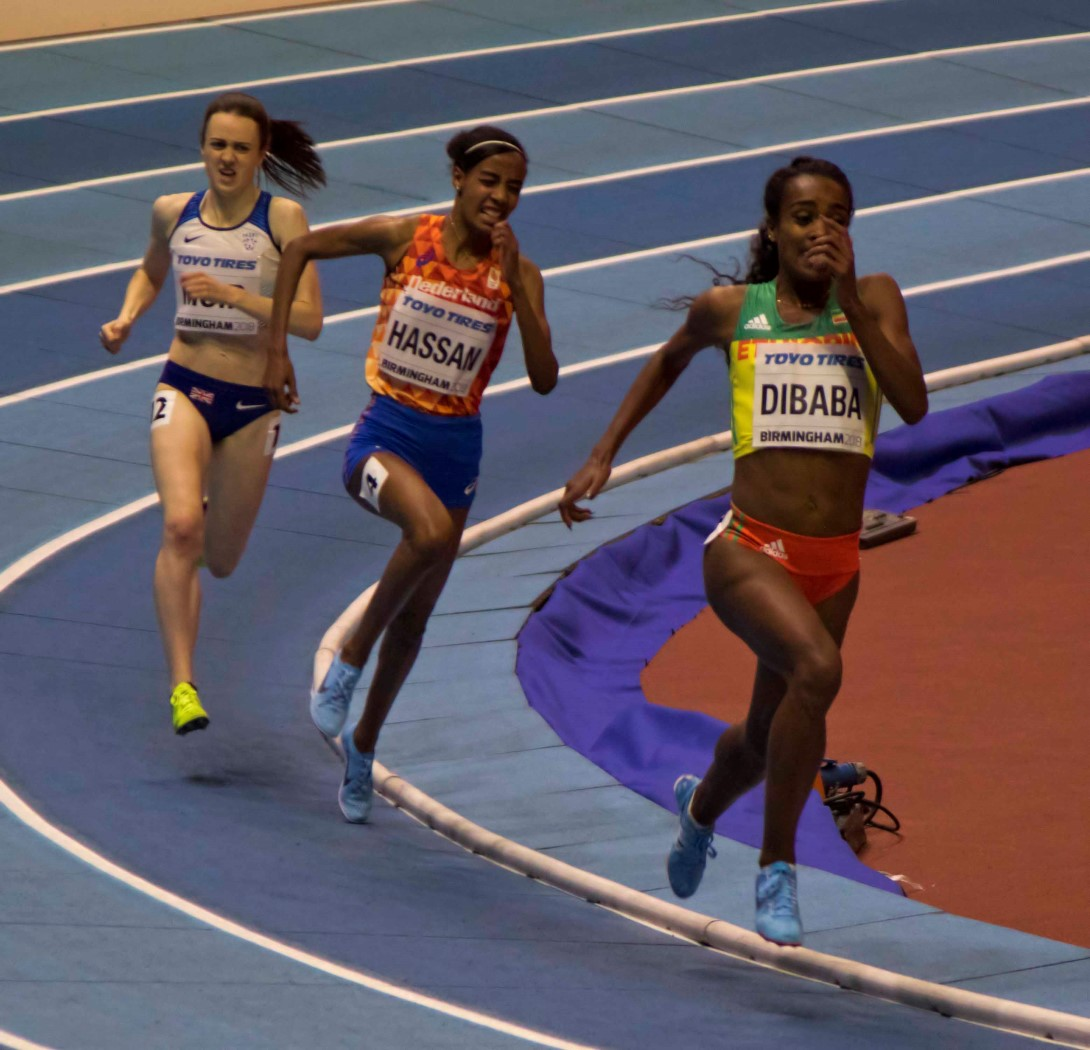
The finish of the race

The final was started at 20:15.

Rank	Name	Nationality	Time	Notes
1st place, gold medalist(s)	Genzebe Dibaba	Ethiopia	8:45.05	
2nd place, silver medalist(s)	Sifan Hassan	Netherlands	8:45.68	SB
3rd place, bronze medalist(s)	Laura Muir	Great Britain	8:45.78	SB
4	Hellen Obiri	Kenya	8:49.66	
5	Shelby Houlihan	United States	8:50.38	
6	Fantu Worku	Ethiopia	8:50.54	
7	Konstanze Klosterhalfen	Germany	8:51.79	
8	Katie Mackey	United States	8:56.62	
9	Dominique Scott	South Africa	8:59.93	
10	Eilish McColgan	Great Britain	9:01.32	
11	Geneviève Lalonde	Canada	9:03.91	
12	Meraf Bahta	Sweden	9:05.94	
13	Claudia Bobocea	Romania	9:23.70	
14	Tamara Amroush	Jordan	9:45.68	
