= Ancuța Bobocel =

Romanian middle-distance runner (born 1987)

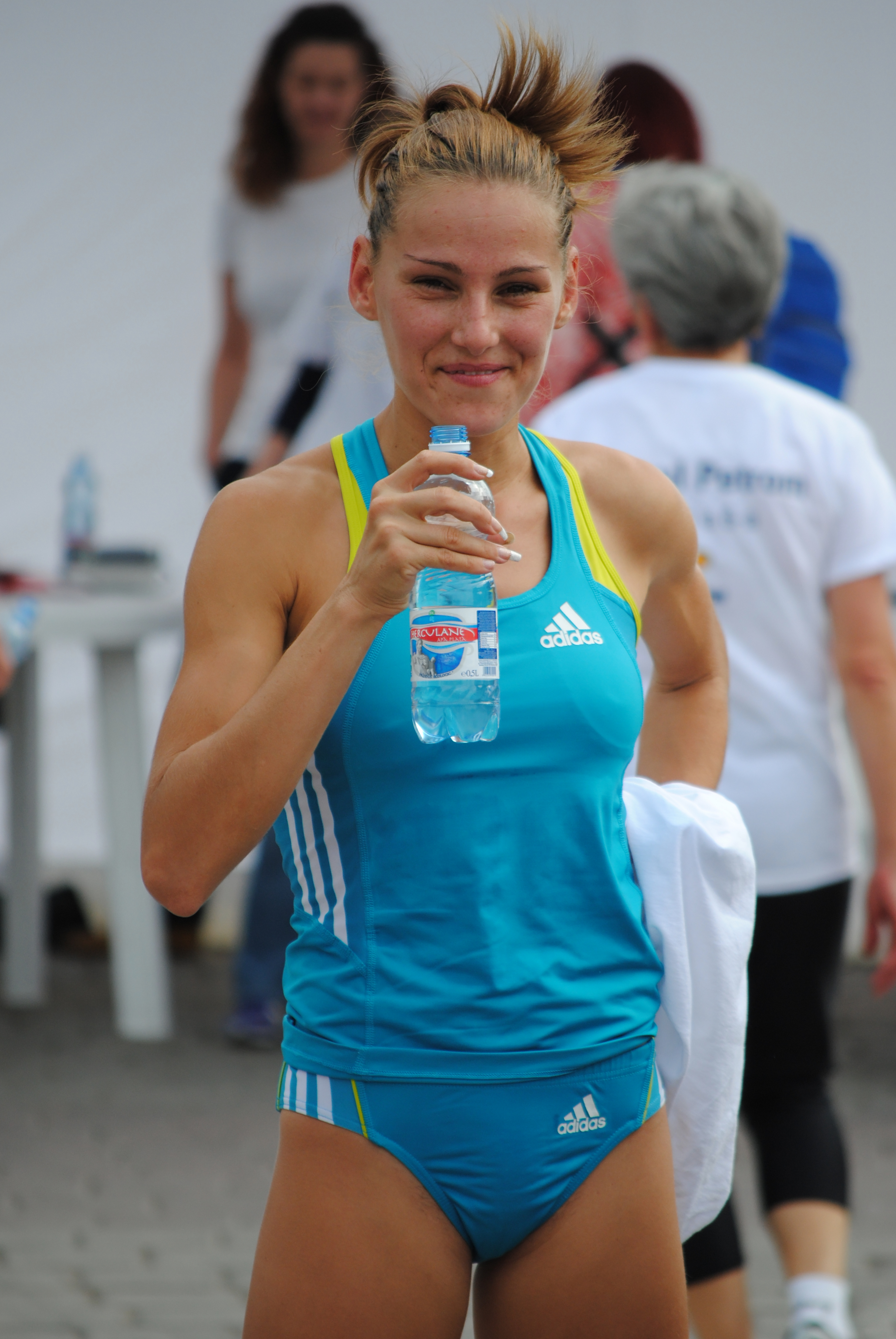
- Bobocel finishes first in the 6th edition of Petrom Cross in Bucharest in 2011

Personal information
- Born: 3 October 1987 (age 39) Drobeta-Turnu Severin, Mehedinţi, Romania
- Height: 1.67 m (5 ft 6 in)
- Weight: 49 kg (108 lb)

Sport
- Country: Romania
- Sport: Track and field
- Event: 3000m steeplechase

Ancuța Bobocel (born 3 October 1987 in Drobeta-Turnu Severin) is a Romanian middle-distance runner who specializes in the 3000 metres steeplechase. She represented Romania at the 2008, 2012 and 2016 Summer Olympics and is a three-time participant at the World Championships in Athletics (2007, 2009 and 2013). In 2009, she won the European U23 and Jeux de la Francophonie steeplechase titles, as well as a silver at the Summer Universiade.

== Career ==
Bobocel rose to prominence as a junior athlete competing in the steeplechase and in cross country running. She was the silver medallist in the steeplechase at the 2003 European Athletics Junior Championships, then repeated that finish at the 2004 World Junior Championships in Athletics. She was also the junior runner-up at the 2004 European Cross Country Championships that year. In 2005, she was twentieth in the junior race at the World Cross Country Championships and won the junior title at the 2005 European Cross Country Championships. She also retained her silver medal in the steeplechase at the 2005 European Athletics Junior Championships. She set a European junior record of 9:37.45 to take another steeplechase silver at the 2006 World Junior Championships in Athletics, but managed only third in the junior race at the 2006 European Cross Country Championships.

Her senior debut came over 3000 metres at the 2007 European Athletics Indoor Championships, where she was eleventh in the final. At the 2007 European Athletics U23 Championships she was runner-up to Katarzyna Kowalska, then represented Romania in the discipline at the 2007 World Championships in Athletics, being eliminated in the heats stage. The same fate beset her on her Olympic debut at the 2008 Beijing Olympics. She set a 3000 m best to finish eighth at the 2009 European Athletics Indoor Championships and reached the top of the podium in the steeplechase at the 2009 European Athletics U23 Championships. She was again eliminated in the heats of the 2009 World Championships in Athletics, but won medals at smaller competitions: she was the silver medallist behind Sara Moreira at the 2009 Summer Universiade and the gold medallist at the 2009 Jeux de la Francophonie.

Bobocel did not progress beyond the heats of the 3000 m at the 2010 IAAF World Indoor Championships, but was ninth in the final at the 2010 European Athletics Championships. She did not compete in the steeplechase in 2011, but instead entered the 1500 metres at the 2011 European Athletics Indoor Championships (although she was knocked out in the heats). She won the senior title at the 2012 World University Cross Country Championships and also led Romania to second in the team rankings.

== Achievements ==
Year	Competition	Venue	Position	Event	Notes
Representing Romania
2004	World Junior Championships	Grosseto, Italy	2nd	3000 m s'chase	9:49.03 PB
2004	European Cross Country Championships	Heringsdorf, Germany	2nd	Junior race (3.64 km)	15:57
2004	European Cross Country Championships	Heringsdorf, Germany	1st	Junior race Team	51 pts
2005	European Junior Championships	Kaunas, Lithuania	2nd	3000 m s'chase	10:14.29
2005	European Cross Country Championships	Tilburg, Netherlands	1st	Junior race (4.83 km)	15:23
2005	European Cross Country Championships	Tilburg, Netherlands	2nd	Junior race Team	48 pts
2006	World Junior Championships	Beijing, China	2nd	3000 m s'chase	9:46.19
2006	European Cross Country Championships	San Giorgio su Legnano, Italy	3rd	Junior race (4.1 km)	12:51
2006	European Cross Country Championships	San Giorgio su Legnano, Italy	3rd	Junior race Team	83 pts
2007	European Indoor Championships	Birmingham, England	11th	3000 m	9:18.76
2007	European U23 Championships	Debrecen, Hungary	2nd	3000 m s'chase	9:41.84
2007	World Championships	Osaka, Japan	23rd (h)	3000 m s'chase	9:53.44
2008	Olympic Games	Beijing, China	23rd (h)	3000 m s'chase	9:35.31
2008	European Cross Country Championships	Brussels, Belgium	5th	U23 race (6 km)	21:43
2009	European Indoor Championships	Turin, Italy	8th	3000 m	8:59.78
2009	European U23 Championships	Kaunas, Lithuania	1st	3000 m s'chase	9:47.90
2009	Universiade	Belgrade, Serbia	2nd	3000 m s'chase	9:38.14
2009	World Championships	Berlin, Germany	17th (h)	3000 m s'chase	9:34.39
2009	Jeux de la Francophonie	Beirut, Lebanon	1st	3000 m s'chase	10:05.01
2010	World Indoor Championships	Doha, Qatar	9th (h)	3000 m	8:54.08
2010	European Championships	Barcelona, Spain	9th	3000 m s'chase	9:41.20
2011	European Indoor Championships	Paris, France	14th (h)	1500 m	4:12.71
2011	European Cross Country Championships	Velenje, Slovenia	41st	Senior race (8.170 km)	28:17
2011	European Cross Country Championships	Velenje, Slovenia	5th	Senior race Team	88 pts
2012	European Championships	Helsinki, Finland	5th	3000 m s'chase	9:41.32
2012	Olympic Games	London, United Kingdom	16th (h)	3000 m s'chase	9:31.06
2013	European Indoor Championships	Gothenburg, Sweden	11th	3000 m	9:18.37
2013	World Championships	Moscow, Russia	13th	3000 m s'chase	9:53.35
2013	Jeux de la Francophonie	Nice, France	1st	3000 m s'chase	9:46.82
2016	European Championships	Amsterdam, Netherlands	17th (h)	3000 m s'chase	9:48.91
2016	Olympic Games	Rio de Janeiro, Brazil	38th (h)	3000 m s'chase	9:46.28
2017	European Indoor Championships	Belgrade, Serbia	11th	3000 m	9:05.74
2018	European Championships	Berlin, Germany	–	10,000 m	DNF

=== Personal bests ===
- 800 metres – 2:02.72 min (2008)
- 1500 metres – 4:13.20 min (2010)
- 1500 metres (indoor) – 4:08.13 min (2011)
- 3000 metres – 9:10.58 min (2007)
- 3000 metres (indoor) – 8:52.86 (2013)
- 3000 metres steeplechase – 9:25.70 (2012)
