= 2013 European Athletics Indoor Championships – Women's 3000 metres =

The women's 3000 metres event at the 2013 European Athletics Indoor Championships was held at March 2, 2013 at 12:25 (round 1), and March 3, 12:10 (final) local time.

== Records ==
Standing records prior to the 2013 European Athletics Indoor Championships
World record	Meseret Defar (ETH)	8:23.72	Stuttgart, Germany	3 February 2007
European record	Liliya Shobukhova (RUS)	8:27.86	Moscow, Russia	17 February 2006
Championship record	Fernanda Ribeiro (POR)	8:39.49	Stockholm, Sweden	9 March 1996
World Leading	Genzebe Dibaba (ETH)	8:26.95	Stockholm, Sweden	21 February 2013
European Leading	Svetlana Kireyeva (RUS)	8:48.27	Moscow, Russia	12 February 2013

== Results ==
=== Round 1 ===
Qualification: First 4 (Q) or and the 4 fastest athletes (q) advanced to the final.

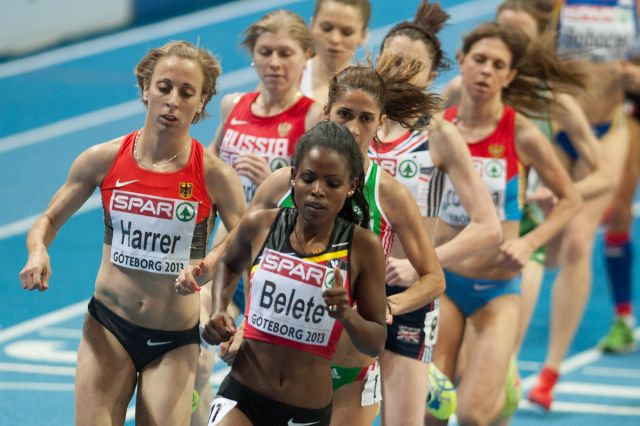
The final underway.

Rank	Heat	Athlete	Nationality	Time	Note
1	1	Sara Moreira	Portugal	9:01.00	Q
2	2	Natalya Aristarkhova	Russia	9:02.61	Q
3	1	Lauren Howarth	Great Britain	9:03.30	Q
4	1	Fionnuala Britton	Ireland	9:03.30	Q
5	2	Corinna Harrer	Germany	9:03.41	Q
6	2	Almensh Belete	Belgium	9:04.41	Q
7	1	Yelena Korobkina	Russia	9:04.89	Q
8	1	Poļina Jeļizarova	Latvia	9:05.96	q
9	2	Christine Bardelle	France	9:06.50	Q
10	1	Roxana Bârcă	Romania	9:09.09	q
11	2	Ancuța Bobocel	Romania	9:09.22	q
12	1	Dudu Karakaya	Turkey	9:09.70	q
13	2	Silvia Weissteiner	Italy	9:12.73	
14	1	Paula González	Spain	9:17.76	
15	1	Charlotta Fougberg	Sweden	9:21.15	
16	2	Teresa Urbina	Spain	9:23.65	
17	2	Ercilia Machado	Portugal	9:35.97	
	2	Layes Abdullayeva	Azerbaijan	DNF	

=== Final ===
The final was held at 12:10.

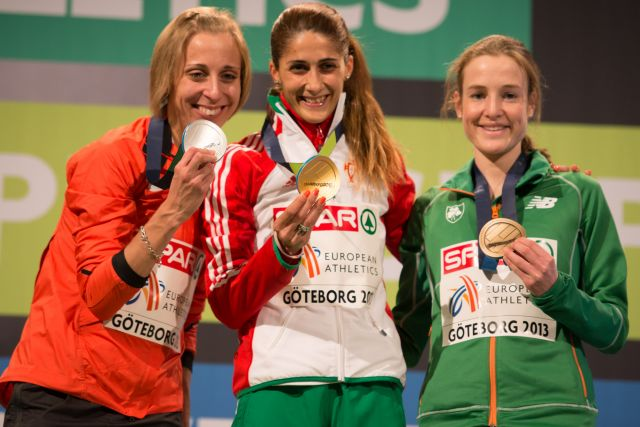
The medalists (left to right): Corinna Harrer, Sara Moreira, Fionnuala Britton.

Rank	Athlete	Nationality	Time	Note
1st place, gold medalist(s)	Sara Moreira	Portugal	8:58.50	
2nd place, silver medalist(s)	Corinna Harrer	Germany	9:00.50	
3rd place, bronze medalist(s)	Fionnuala Britton	Ireland	9:00.54	
4	Yelena Korobkina	Russia	9:00.59	
5	Almensh Belete	Belgium	9:03.89	
6	Lauren Howarth	Great Britain	9:04.04	
7	Christine Bardelle	France	9:08.62	
8	Poļina Jeļizarova	Latvia	9:09.86	
9	Roxana Bârcă	Romania	9:10.51	
10	Dudu Karakaya	Turkey	9:15.07	
11	Ancuța Bobocel	Romania	9:18.37	
12	Natalya Aristarkhova	Russia	9:23.28	
