= Athletics at the 2013 Summer Universiade – Women's 3000 metres steeplechase =

The women's 3000 metres steeplechase event at the 2013 Summer Universiade was held on 10 July. All three original medalists were later disqualified from the competition.

== Results ==
Rank	Name	Nationality	Time	Notes
1st place, gold medalist(s)	Chantelle Groenewoud	Canada	9:51.17	PB
2nd place, silver medalist(s)	Jessica Furlan	Canada	9:51.23	PB
3rd place, bronze medalist(s)	Sandra Eriksson	Finland	9:55.11	
4	Michelle Finn	Ireland	10:03.28	
5	Vaida Žūsinaitė	Lithuania	10:04.37	SB
6	Eva Krchová	Czech Republic	10:17.96	
7	Simone Glad	Denmark	10:30.68	
~~1~~	Yuliya Zaripova	Russia	~~9:28.00~~	~~UR~~, DQ
~~2~~	Svitlana Shmidt	Ukraine	~~9:40.41~~	DQ
~~3~~	Gülcan Mıngır	Turkey	~~9:45.88~~	DQ
	Natalya Aristarkhova	Russia	DNS	
