= 2012 European Athletics Championships – Women's 3000 metres steeplechase =

Athletics Championships held in Helsinki

Women's 3000 metres steeplechase at the European Athletics Championships

The women's 3000 metres steeplechase at the 2012 European Athletics Championships was held at the Helsinki Olympic Stadium on 28 and 30 June.

== Medalists ==
Gold	Gülcan Mıngır; Turkey
Silver	Antje Möldner-Schmidt; Germany
Bronze	Gesa Felicitas Krause; Germany

== Records ==
Standing records prior to the 2012 European Athletics Championships
World record	Gulnara Samitova (RUS)	8:58.81	Beijing, PR China	17 August 2008
European record	Gulnara Samitova (RUS)	8:58.81	Beijing, PR China	17 August 2008
Championship record	Yuliya Zarudneva (RUS)	9:17.57	Barcelona, Spain	30 July 2010
World Leading	Milcah Chemos Cheywa (KEN)	9:07.14	Oslo, Norway	7 June 2012
European Leading	Gülcan Mıngır (TUR)	9:13.53	Sofia, Bulgaria	9 June 2012

== Schedule ==
Date	Time	Round
28 June 2012	11:40	Round 1
30 June 2012	19:55	Final

== Results ==
=== Round 1 ===
First 4 in each heat (Q) and 7 best performers (q) advance to the Semifinals.

Rank	Heat	Lane	Name	Nationality	Time	Note
1	2	7	Gülcan Mıngır	Turkey	9:32.39	Q
2	2	5	Antje Möldner-Schmidt	Germany	9:33.47	Q
3	2	13	Gesa Felicitas Krause	Germany	9:35.86	Q
DQ	1	5	Svitlana Shmidt	Ukraine	~~9:36.77~~	Q, Doping
DQ	2	3	Lyubov Kharlamova	Russia	~~9:39.53~~	Q, Doping
4	1	3	Poļina Jeļizarova	Latvia	9:39.92	Q
5	1	11	Diana Martín	Spain	9:40.02	Q
6	1	4	Natalya Gorchakova	Russia	9:40.09	Q
7	1	8	Clarisse Cruz	Portugal	9:40.30	q, PB
8	2	11	Ancuța Bobocel	Romania	9:40.88	q
9	1	2	Silvia Danekova	Bulgaria	9:42.72	q, PB
10	1	9	Sanaa Koubaa	Germany	9:43.08	q, PB
11	2	12	Stephanie Reilly	Ireland	9:44.15	q, SB
12	2	10	Zulema Fuentes-Pila	Spain	9:54.16	q
13	1	7	Sandra Eriksson	Finland	9:55.58	q
14	1	12	Matylda Szlęzak	Poland	9:56.30	
15	1	6	Hattie Dean	Great Britain	9:57.00	SB
16	2	2	Giulia Martinelli	Italy	9:57.19	
17	2	1	Vaida Žūsinaitė	Lithuania	9:58.37	PB
18	2	8	Carla Salomé Rocha	Portugal	10:02.00	
19	2	9	Özlem Kaya	Turkey	10:11.69	
20	2	6	Mariya Shatalova	Ukraine	10:15.69	
	1	1	Astrid Leutert	Switzerland	DNF	
	1	10	Binnaz Uslu	Turkey	DNF	Doping
	1	13	Marta Domínguez	Spain	DNF	Doping
	2	4	Sviatlana Kudzelich	Belarus	DQ	

=== Final ===
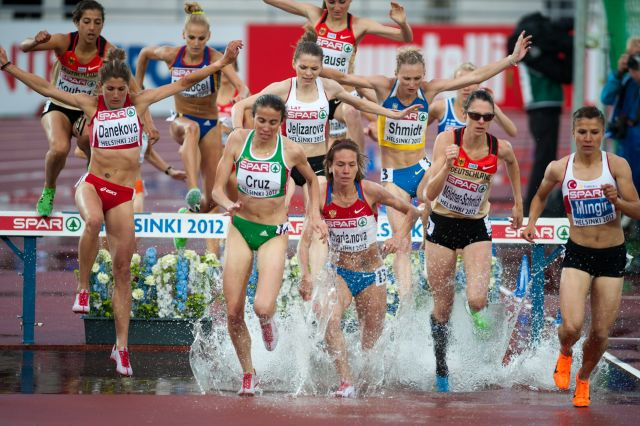
The final underway

Rank	Name	Nationality	Time	Note
1st place, gold medalist(s)	Gülcan Mıngır	Turkey	9:32.96	
DQ	Svitlana Shmidt	Ukraine	~~9:33.03~~	Doping
2nd place, silver medalist(s)	Antje Möldner-Schmidt	Germany	9:36.37	
3rd place, bronze medalist(s)	Gesa Felicitas Krause	Germany	9:38.20	
4	Ancuța Bobocel	Romania	9:41.32	
5	Poļina Jeļizarova	Latvia	9:41.38	
6	Natalya Gorchakova	Russia	9:42.98	
7	Diana Martín	Spain	9:45.36	
8	Clarisse Cruz	Portugal	9:47.76	
9	Sandra Eriksson	Finland	9:48.19	SB
10	Silvia Danekova	Bulgaria	9:51.45	
11	Stephanie Reilly	Ireland	9:53.90	
DQ	Lyubov Kharlamova	Russia	~~9:58.44~~	Doping
12	Sanaa Koubaa	Germany	10:02.33	
13	Zulema Fuentes-Pila	Spain	10:05.06	
