= Türkan Erişmiş =

Turkish middle-distance runner

Personal information
- Nationality: Turkey
- Born: 5 January 1984 (age 42) Ağrı, Turkey
- Height: 170 cm (5 ft 7 in)
- Weight: 52 kg (115 lb)

Sport
- Sport: Middle-distance
- Club: Beşiktaş J.K. Athletics Team, Istanbul
- Coached by: Ali Çelik

Achievements and titles
- Personal best: 3000 m sc 9:28.84 NR (2009)
Medal record
Women's athletics
Representing Turkey
European Team Championships First League
Bronze medal – third place	2006 Thessaloniki	3000 m sc
Summer Universiade
Bronze medal – third place	2005 İzmir	3000 m sc
Bronze medal – third place	2007 Bangkok	3000 m sc
Bronze medal – third place	2009 Belgrade	3000 m sc
European Cross Country Championships
Bronze medal – third place	2006 San Giorgio su Legnano	5.975 km U23
European U23 Championships
Silver medal – second place	2005 Erfurt	3000 m sc

Türkan Erişmiş (born 5 January 1984 in Ağrı, Turkey), aka Türkan Bozkurt, Türkan Bozkurt Erişmiş or Türkan Özata-Erişmiş, is a Turkish female middle distance runner competing mostly in the 3000 m steeplechase and cross country running events. The 170 cm (5 ft 7 in) tall athlete at 52 kg (115 lb) graduated from Niğde University, and works now as a teacher of physical education.

In 1996, at the age of twelve, she moved to Ankara leaving her parents in Ağrı. She was discovered and recommended to coach Ali Çelik in Ankara by a former athlete Sermet Timurlenk in her hometown. She was a member of Kasımpaşaspor in Istanbul before she transferred to Üsküdar Belediyespor. Currently, she is running for Beşiktaş J.K. Athletics Team.

She won the bronze medal in the 5.975 km event of U23 category at the 2006 European Cross Country Championships held in San Giorgio su Legnano, Italy.

Erişmiş earned a bronze medal in 3000 m steeplechase at the 2005 Summer Universiade held in İzmir, Turkey setting the national record. She repeated her same success at the 2007 Summer Universiade held in Bangkok, Thailand setting the national record again. She repeated her bronze medal gain at the 2009 Summer Universiade held in Belgrade, Serbia.

She participated in the 3000 m steeplechase event at the 2008 Summer Olympics without advancing to the final.

On 13 June 2009 Türkan Erişmiş set the national record in 3000 m steeplechase with 9:28.84 that lasted until 9 June 2012, to be broken by Gülcan Mıngır in Sofia, Bulgaria with 9:13.53.

== Personal life ==
Türkan Erişmiş is married to Fahrettin Özata, a national wrestler. On 12 March 2010 she gave birth to a son, named Mustad.

== Achievements ==
Year	Competition	Venue	Position	Event	Notes
Representing Turkey
1999	European Cross Country Championships	Velenje, Slovenia	4th	Junior women	13:07
2000	World Junior Championships	Santiago, Chile	11th	3000m	9:43.75
2000	World Junior Championships	Santiago, Chile	10th	5000m	17:24.66
2001	European Cross Country Championships	Thun, Switzerland	7th	3.15 km Junior women	11:11
2005	European U23 Championships	Erfurt, Germany	Silver	3000 m sc	9:55.45
2005	Mediterranean Games	Almeria, Spain	5th	Half marathon	1:17:56.00
2006	European Cross Country Championships	San Giorgio su Legnano, Italy	Bronze	5.975 km U23	19:09
2006	European Athletics Cup; First League Group B	Thessaloniki, Greece	Bronze	3000 m sc	10:03.46
2007	Summer Universiade	Bangkok, Thailand	Bronze	3000 m sc	9:46.12
2008	Great Atatürk Race	Ankara, Turkey	Gold	10 km street	33:56
2008	Beirut Marathon	Beirut, Lebanon	Gold	Marathon	
2009	Summer Universiade	Belgrade, Serbia	Bronze	3000 m sc	9:38.87
2009	Cezmi Or Memorial	Istanbul, Turkey	Gold	3000 m sc	9:28.84 NR
2012	Cezmi Or Memorial	Istanbul, Turkey	Gold	3000 m sc	9:44.28 SB
