= Teresa Urbina =

Spanish athletics competitor

Personal information
- Full name: María Teresa Urbina Gómez
- Born: 20 March 1985 (age 41) Zorita, Spain
- Height: 1.77 m (5 ft 10 in)
- Weight: 53 kg (117 lb)

Sport
- Sport: Athletics
- Event: 3000 m steeplechase
- Club: F.C. Barcelona
- Coached by: Eugenio Barrios

María Teresa Urbina Gómez (born 20 March 1985, in Zorita) is a Spanish runner competing primarily in the 3000 metres steeplechase. She represented her country at the 2017 World Championships without qualifying for the final. Additionally, she won a silver medal at the 2006 Ibero-American Championships.

== International competitions ==
Year	Competition	Venue	Position	Event	Notes
Representing Spain
2004	World Junior Championships	Grosseto, Italy	11th	3000 m s'chase	10:36.43
2005	European U23 Championships	Erfurt, Germany	7th	3000 m s'chase	10:14.20
2006	Ibero-American Championships	Ponce, Puerto Rico	2nd	3000 m s'chase	10:05.74
2007	European U23 Championships	Debrecen, Hungary	5th	3000 m s'chase	10:03.80
2007	Universiade	Bangkok, Thailand	–	3000 m s'chase	DNF
2008	Ibero-American Championships	Iquique, Chile	4th	3000 m s'chase	10:06.70
2009	Universiade	Belgrade, Serbia	5th	3000 m s'chase	9:51.21
2013	European Indoor Championships	Gothenburg, Sweden	16th (h)	3000 m	9:23.65
2013	World Cross Country Championships	Bydgoszcz, Poland	57th	8 km cross	26:30
2013	Mediterranean Games	Mersin, Turkey	–	3000 m s'chase	DNF
2014	European Championships	Zürich, Switzerland	–	3000 m s'chase	DNF
2017	World Cross Country Championships	Kampala, Uganda	56th	10 km cross	36:49
2017	World Championships	London, United Kingdom	40th (h)	3000 m s'chase	10:21.90
2018	World Half Marathon Championships	Valencia, Spain	63rd	Half Marathon	1:14:53
2018	Mediterranean Games	Tarragona, Spain	11th	3000 m s'chase	10:06.26

== Personal bests ==
Outdoor

- 1500 metres – 4:29.58 (Cáceres 2007)
- 3000 metres – 9:25.45 (Ciudad Real 2017)
- 5000 metres – 16:48.42 (Gijón 2005)
- 10 kilometres – 33:46 (Madrid 2012)
- Half marathon – 1:15:26 (Madrid 2017)
- 2000 metres steeplechase – 6:32.33 (Fuenlabrada 2017)
- 3000 metres steeplechase – 9:41.95 (Heusden-Zolder 2009)

Indoor

- 3000 metres – 9:09.50 (Karlsruhe 2013)
