= Athletics at the 2009 Summer Universiade – Women's 3000 metres steeplechase =

The women's 3000 metres steeplechase event at the 2009 Summer Universiade was held on 8–10 July.

== Medalists ==
Gold	Silver	Bronze
Sara Moreira; Portugal	Ancuța Bobocel; Romania	Türkan Erişmiş; Turkey

== Results ==
=== Heats ===
Qualification: First 4 of each heat (Q) and the next 4 fastest (q) qualified for the final.

Rank	Heat	Name	Nationality	Time	Notes
1	1	Türkan Erişmiş	Turkey	9:54.66	Q
2	1	Sara Moreira	Portugal	9:55.10	Q
3	1	Oxana Juravel	Moldova	10:00.82	Q
4	1	Ancuța Bobocel	Romania	10:01.23	Q
5	1	Ida Nilsson	Sweden	10:02.65	q
6	2	Teresa Urbina	Spain	10:05.77	Q
7	2	Fionnuala Britton	Ireland	10:05.89	Q, SB
8	2	Jekaterina Patjuk	Estonia	10:06.50	Q
9	2	Lyudmila Kuzmina	Russia	10:08.88	Q
10	2	Poļina Jeļizarova	Latvia	10:10.24	q, SB
11	1	Li Zhenzhu	China	10:10.86	q
12	1	Angela Wagner	South Africa	10:16.76	q
13	1	Marcela Lustigová	Czech Republic	10:19.04	
14	2	Nolene Conrad	South Africa	10:21.48	
15	2	Jelena Mimić	Serbia	10:22.99	
16	2	Meredith MacGregor	Canada	10:24.90	
17	2	Laila Kærgaard Laursen	Denmark	10:42.70	
18	1	Biljana Cvijanović	Bosnia and Herzegovina	10:51.25	
19	1	Biljana Jović	Serbia	10:55.39	
20	2	Jasmina Delić	Bosnia and Herzegovina	11:43.93	
	2	Valentyna Horpynych	Ukraine	DNF	

=== Final ===
Rank	Name	Nationality	Time	Notes
1st place, gold medalist(s)	Sara Moreira	Portugal	9:32.62	GR
2nd place, silver medalist(s)	Ancuța Bobocel	Romania	9:38.14	
3rd place, bronze medalist(s)	Türkan Erişmiş	Turkey	9:38.87	
4	Oxana Juravel	Moldova	9:47.01	
5	Teresa Urbina	Spain	9:51.21	SB
6	Fionnuala Britton	Ireland	9:54.10	SB
7	Jekaterina Patjuk	Estonia	10:03.95	
8	Ida Nilsson	Sweden	10:04.65	
9	Lyudmila Kuzmina	Russia	10:11.00	
10	Li Zhenzhu	China	10:13.09	
11	Poļina Jeļizarova	Latvia	10:16.93	
12	Angela Wagner	South Africa	10:25.16	
