= Silje Fjørtoft =

Norwegian athletics competitor

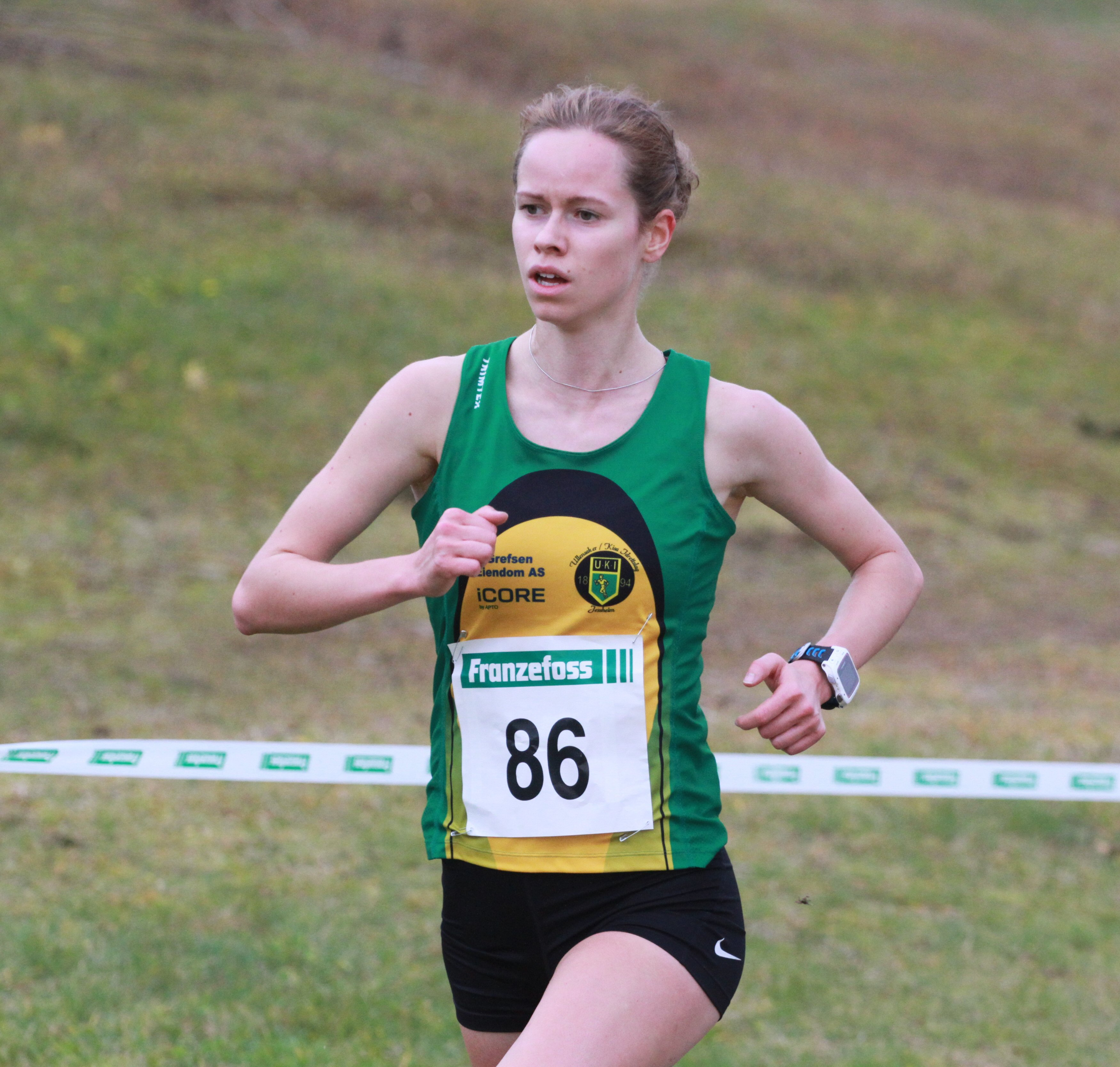
Image of Silje Fjørtoft in 2018

Silje Fjørtoft (born 23 June 1987) is a Norwegian long-distance and steeplechase runner.

She finished sixth at the 2007 European U23 Championships and twelfth at the 2009 European U23 Championships. She also competed at the 2005 European Junior Championships, the 2007 World Championships and the 2009 World Championships without reaching the final.

She became Norwegian steeplechase champion in 2007, 2008 and 2011 and 5000 metres champion in 2015. She represented the club Ørsta IL together with fellow steeplechaser Kristine Eikrem Engeset. After finishing secondary school at Volda Fjørtoft went on to study at the Southern Methodist University and represent SMU Mustangs collegiately. Fjørtoft switched clubs to SK Vidar in Norway, and ahead of the 2017 season to Ullensaker/Kisa IL.

Her personal best times were 9:09.78 minutes in the 3000 metres, achieved in August 2015 in Szczecin; 9:37.97 minutes in the 3000 metres steeplechase, achieved in July 2009 at Bislett stadion; and 15:55.23 minutes in the 5000 metres, achieved in April 2009 in Walnut.
