= Laura Whittle =

Scottish long-distance runner

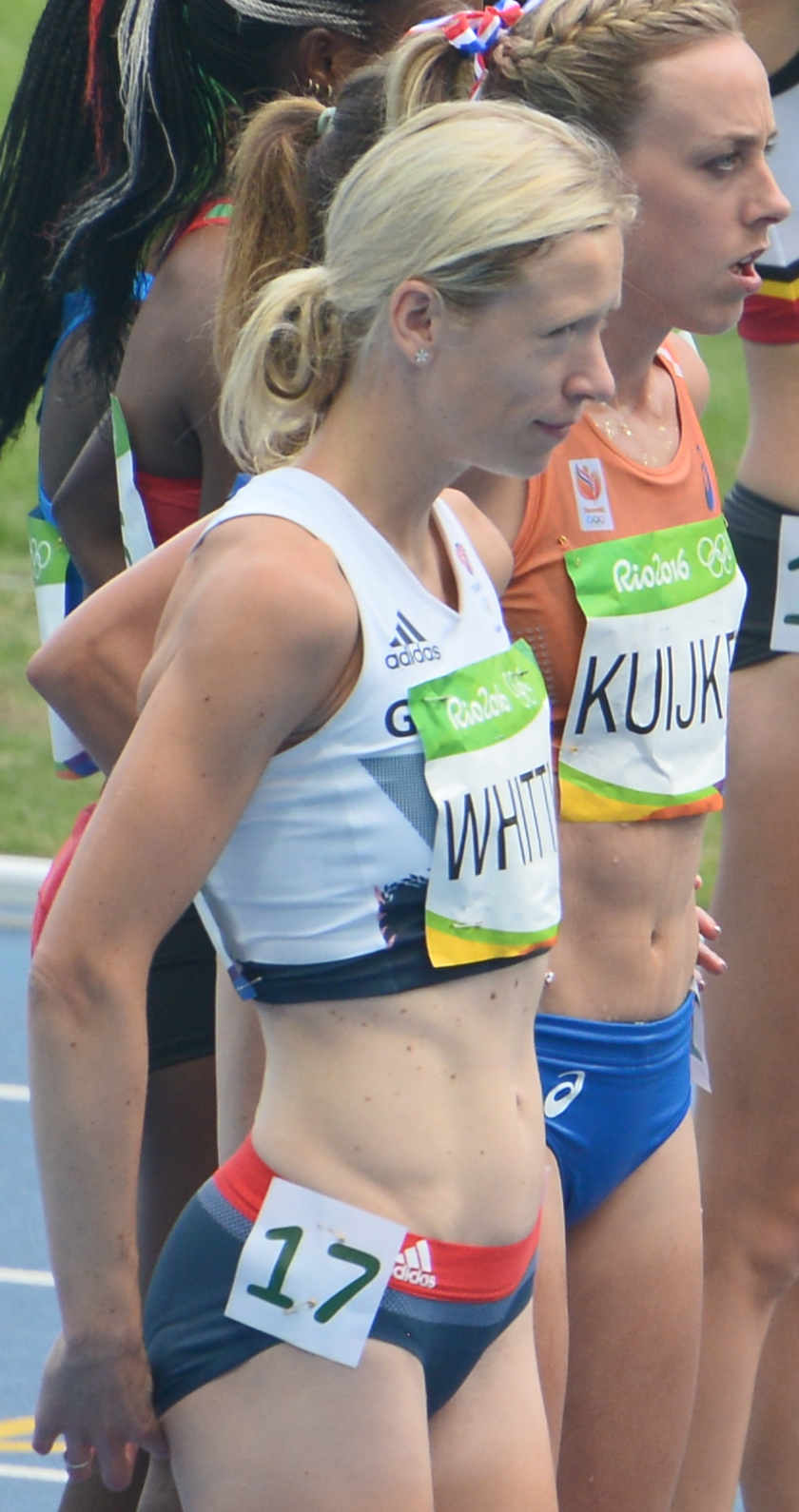
- Whittle at the 2016 Olympics

Personal information
- Born: 27 June 1985 (age 41) Blackpool, England
- Education: Loughborough University
- Height: 175 cm (5 ft 9 in)
- Weight: 59 kg (130 lb)

Sport
- Sport: Athletics
- Event: 1500–5000 m
- Club: Royal Sutton Coldfield Athletics Club
- Coached by: George Gandy

Achievements and titles
- Personal bests: 1500 m – 4:12.48 (2009); 3000 m – 8:50.37 (2009); 5000 m – 15:08.58 (2016)

Laura Whittle (née Kenney; born 27 June 1985) a Scottish long-distance runner.

Whittle was born to an English father and Scottish mother. Her father competed for Scotland in the marathon and cross-country running and motivated Laura to run in a club when she was 11 years old.

At the 2006 European Cross Country Championships she won a team gold medal in the under-23 women's race. She won the 5000 metre title at the 2007 European Athletics U23 Championships. Whittle finished 38th at the 2008 IAAF World Cross Country Championships – Senior women's race. She also finished 8th at the 2009 IAAF World Athletics Final. Whittle also competed at the 2014 Commonwealth Games.

Whittle qualified to represent Team GB in the 5000m at the 2016 Olympic Games. She finished 10th in her heat in a time of 15:31.30

== International competitions ==
Year	Competition	Venue	Position	Event	Notes
Representing Great Britain
2007	European Athletics U23 Championships	Debrecen, Hungary.	1st	5000m	16:22.28

== Personal life ==
She married 1500m runner Rob Whittle in 2010 and changed her name from Laura Kenney to Laura Whittle.
