= 2008 World Junior Championships in Athletics – Women's 3000 metres steeplechase =

Women's steeplechase event held in Bydgoszvz, Poland in July 2008

The women's 3000 metres steeplechase event at the 2008 World Junior Championships in Athletics was held in Bydgoszcz, Poland, at Zawisza Stadium on 8 and 10 July.

== Medalists ==
Gold	Christine Muyanga; Kenya
Silver	Elizabeth Mueni; Kenya
Bronze	Korahubish Itaa; Ethiopia

== Results ==
=== Final ===
10 July

Rank	Name	Nationality	Time	Notes
1st place, gold medalist(s)	Christine Muyanga	Kenya	9:31.35	
2nd place, silver medalist(s)	Elizabeth Mueni	Kenya	9:36.50	
3rd place, bronze medalist(s)	Korahubish Itaa	Ethiopia	9:37.81	
4	Halima Hassen	Ethiopia	9:38.44	
5	Sandra Eriksson	Finland	10:00.87	
6	Poļina Jeļizarova	Latvia	10:07.15	
7	Alexandra Kudryashova	Russia	10:12.74	
8	Lucie Sekanová	Czech Republic	10:16.31	
9	Jessica Furlan	Canada	10:16.32	
10	Mariya Shatalova	Ukraine	10:16.54	
11	Valeria Roffino	Italy	10:25.84	
12	Gülcan Mıngır	Turkey	10:29.77	

=== Heats ===
8 July

==== Heat 1 ====
Rank	Name	Nationality	Time	Notes
1	Elizabeth Mueni	Kenya	10:07.47	Q
2	Korahubish Itaa	Ethiopia	10:08.15	Q
3	Poļina Jeļizarova	Latvia	10:10.39	Q
4	Alexandra Kudryashova	Russia	10:11.82	Q
5	Gülcan Mıngır	Turkey	10:15.67	q
6	Lucie Sekanová	Czech Republic	10:22.18	q
7	Valeria Roffino	Italy	10:23.72	q
8	Jessica Furlan	Canada	10:23.88	q
9	Rebecca Wade	United States	10:24.14	
10	Julia Kick	Germany	10:34.83	
11	Ecaterina Gheorghiu	Romania	10:41.46	
12	Monika Kørra	Norway	10:42.94	
13	Sarah Hattab	Algeria	10:46.63	
14	Íris Anna Skúladóttir	Iceland	10:50.45	
15	Tara Jameson	Ireland	10:57.47	

==== Heat 2 ====
Rank	Name	Nationality	Time	Notes
1	Christine Muyanga	Kenya	9:59.88	Q
2	Halima Hassen	Ethiopia	10:00.27	Q
3	Sandra Eriksson	Finland	10:17.92	Q
4	Mariya Shatalova	Ukraine	10:19.20	Q
5	Martina Barinová	Czech Republic	10:30.61	
6	Elizabeth Graney	United States	10:37.96	
7	Chantelle Groenewoud	Canada	10:38.68	
8	Klara Bodinsson	Sweden	10:41.62	
9	Renata Krasnova	Russia	10:43.71	
10	Sarah McSweeney	New Zealand	10:44.07	
11	Carla Rocha	Portugal	10:49.19	
12	Diana Sujew	Germany	10:50.87	
13	Liliana Wodkowska	Poland	10:54.06	
14	Marina Podkorytova	Kazakhstan	11:04.56	
	Mathilde Carrez	France	DNF	

== Participation ==
According to an unofficial count, 30 athletes from 23 countries participated in the event.

- Algeria (1)
- Canada (2)
- Czech Republic (2)
- Ethiopia (2)
- Finland (1)
- France (1)
- Germany (2)
- Iceland (1)
- Ireland (1)
- Italy (1)
- Kazakhstan (1)
- Kenya (2)
- Latvia (1)
- New Zealand (1)
- Norway (1)
- Poland (1)
- Portugal (1)
- Romania (1)
- Russia (2)
- Sweden (1)
- Turkey (1)
- Ukraine (1)
- United States (2)
