= 2005 European Athletics U23 Championships – Women's 3000 metres steeplechase =

The women's 3000 metres steeplechase event at the 2005 European Athletics U23 Championships was held in Erfurt, Germany, at Steigerwaldstadion on 14 and 16 July.

== Medalists ==
Gold	Katarzyna Kowalska; Poland
Silver	Türkan Erişmiş; Turkey
Bronze	Svetlana Ivanova; Russia

== Results ==
=== Final ===
16 July

Rank	Name	Nationality	Time	Notes
1st place, gold medalist(s)	Katarzyna Kowalska	Poland	9:54.17	
2nd place, silver medalist(s)	Türkan Erişmiş	Turkey	9:55.45	
3rd place, bronze medalist(s)	Svetlana Ivanova	Russia	9:56.44	
4	Dobrinka Shalamanova	Bulgaria	10:00.47	
5	Verena Dreier	Germany	10:05.34	
6	Daneja Grandovec	Slovenia	10:08.82	
7	Teresa Urbina	Spain	10:14.20	
8	Lizzy Hall	United Kingdom	10:16.94	
9	Fionnuala Britton	Ireland	10:17.58	
10	Valeriya Mara	Ukraine	10:18.99	
11	Valentyna Horpynych	Ukraine	10:19.72	
12	Gwendoline Despres	France	10:22.82	

=== Heats ===
14 July
Qualified: first 4 in each heat and 4 best to the Final

==== Heat 1 ====
Rank	Name	Nationality	Time	Notes
1	Katarzyna Kowalska	Poland	9:55.17	Q
2	Valentyna Horpynych	Ukraine	9:56.55	Q
3	Verena Dreier	Germany	9:56.70	Q
4	Türkan Erişmiş	Turkey	9:56.73	Q
5	Dobrinka Shalamanova	Bulgaria	9:56.75	q
6	Lizzy Hall	United Kingdom	10:07.90	q
7	Teresa Urbina	Spain	10:12.66	q
8	Nancy Frouin	France	10:27.16	
9	Maria Pardalou	Greece	10:27.41	
10	Agata Dróżdż	Poland	10:36.52	
11	Alina Proca	Romania	10:52.09	

==== Heat 2 ====
Rank	Name	Nationality	Time	Notes
1	Daneja Grandovec	Slovenia	10:10.60	Q
2	Svetlana Ivanova	Russia	10:11.51	Q
3	Valeriya Mara	Ukraine	10:12.30	Q
4	Fionnuala Britton	Ireland	10:15.19	Q
5	Gwendoline Despres	France	10:19.72	q
6	Xenia Kazimirova	Greece	10:20.90	
7	Dina Malheiro	Portugal	10:25.92	
8	Biljana Jović	Serbia and Montenegro	10:29.74	
9	Giorgia Robaudo	Italy	10:33.62	
10	Natallia Hryhoryeva	Belarus	10:34.13	
11	Iwona Lewandowska	Poland	10:44.92	

== Participation ==
According to an unofficial count, 22 athletes from 17 countries participated in the event.

- Belarus (1)
- Bulgaria (1)
- France (2)
- Germany (1)
- Greece (2)
- Ireland (1)
- Italy (1)
- Poland (3)
- Portugal (1)
- Romania (1)
- Russia (1)
- Serbia and Montenegro (1)
- Slovenia (1)
- Spain (1)
- Turkey (1)
- Ukraine (2)
- United Kingdom (1)
