= Valeria Roffino =

Italian long-distance runner

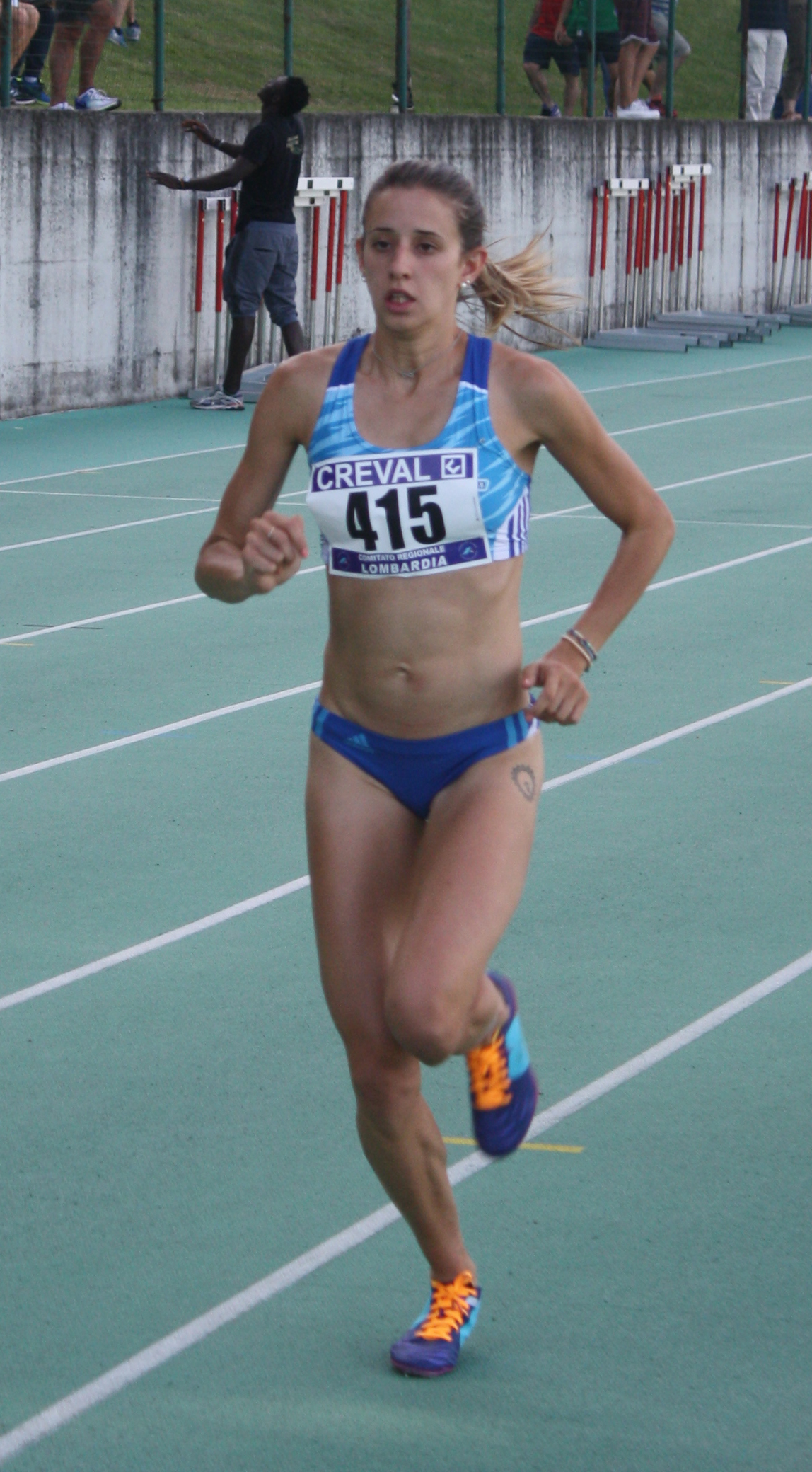

Personal information
- National team: Italy (10 caps)
- Born: April 9, 1990 (age 36) Biella, Italy
- Height: 1.66 m (5 ft 5 in)
- Weight: 45 kg (99 lb)

Sport
- Sport: Athletics
- Events: 3000 metres steeplechase Long-distance running
- Club: Fiamme Azzurre
- Coached by: Clelia Zola

Achievements and titles
- Personal bests: 3000 m st: 9:53.82 (2014); 5000 m: 15:57.42 (2018)

Valeria Roffino (born 9 April 1990) is a retired Italian long-distance runner who specializes in the 3000 metres steeplechase, who won three national championships at individual senior level from 1981 to 1985 in two different specialities.

== Biography ==
She finished eleventh at the 2007 World Youth Championships and at the 2008 World Junior Championships, and ninth at the 2015 Summer Universiade. She also competed at the 2011 European U23 Championships and the 2014 European Championships without reaching the final.

Her personal best time is 9:53.82 minutes, achieved in July 2014 in Rovereto. She became Italian champion in 2014 and 2015, and also in the 5000 metres in 2017.

== National titles ==
- Italian Athletics Championships
  - 3000 m steeplechase: 2014, 2015
  - 5000 m: 2017

== See also ==
- Italian all-time lists - 3000 m steeplechase
