= Paula González Berodia =

Spanish runner

Paula González Berodia (born 2 May 1985 in San Felices de Buelna) is a Spanish middle and long-distance runner. In 2010, 2012 and 2013 she won the 3000m race at the Spanish Indoor Championships and in 2011 and 2014 placed second. In outdoor races, Berodia has won two silver medals in the 5000m race and at Seville has also won three 10 km races, two half-marathons and two full marathons. In 2016, when she was the winner of the 42 km Marathon at Seville in a record time, she qualified to represent her country at the 2016 Summer Olympics. However, she had to pull out due to an injury. In 2017, Berodia won the Seville Marathon again and therefore qualified for the London Cup.

== Competition record ==
Year	Competition	Venue	Position	Event	Notes
Representing Spain
2010	Ibero-American Championships	San Fernando, Spain	5th	5000 m	16:19.97
2011	European Indoor Championships	Paris, France	11th	3000 m	9:20.32
2012	World Indoor Championships	Istanbul, Turkey	21st (h)	3000 m	9:31.09
2013	European Indoor Championships	Gothenburg, Sweden	14th (h)	3000 m	9:17.76
2014	European Championships	Zürich, Switzerland	16th	5000 m	16:24.58
2017	World Championships	London, United Kingdom	46th	Marathon	2:42:47

== Personal bests ==
- 3000 metres - 9:22.97 (2013) / 9:01.37(i) (2012)
- 5000 metres - 15:37.62 (2014)
- 10000 metres - 32:56.13 (2014)
- Half Marathon - 1:11:04 (2016)
- Marathon - 2:28:54 (2017)
