= Gladys Kipkemoi =

Kenyan long-distance runner

Personal information
- Born: 15 October 1986 (age 40)
Medal record
Representing Kenya
Women's athletics
World Junior Championships
Gold medal – first place	2004 Grosseto	3000 m steeple

Gladys Jerotich Kipkemoi (born 15 October 1986) is a Kenyan long-distance runner who specializes in the 3000 metres steeplechase.

She won the 2004 World Junior Championships and finished fourth at the 2006 World Athletics Final.

== International competitions ==
Year	Competition	Venue	Position	Event	Notes
Representing Kenya
2004	World Junior Championships	Grosseto, Italy	1st	3000 m steeple	9:47.26
2006	World Athletics Final	Stuttgart, Germany	4th	3000 m steeple	9:37.57
2009	World Championships	Berlin, Germany	8th	3000 m steeple	9:14.62
2009	World Athletics Final	Thessaloniki, Greece	3rd	3000 m s'chase	9:21.18

== Personal bests ==
- 3000 metres - 9:08.22 min (2006)
- 3000 metres steeplechase - 9:13.22 min (2010)
