= Caroline Chepkurui =

Kenyan steeplechase runner

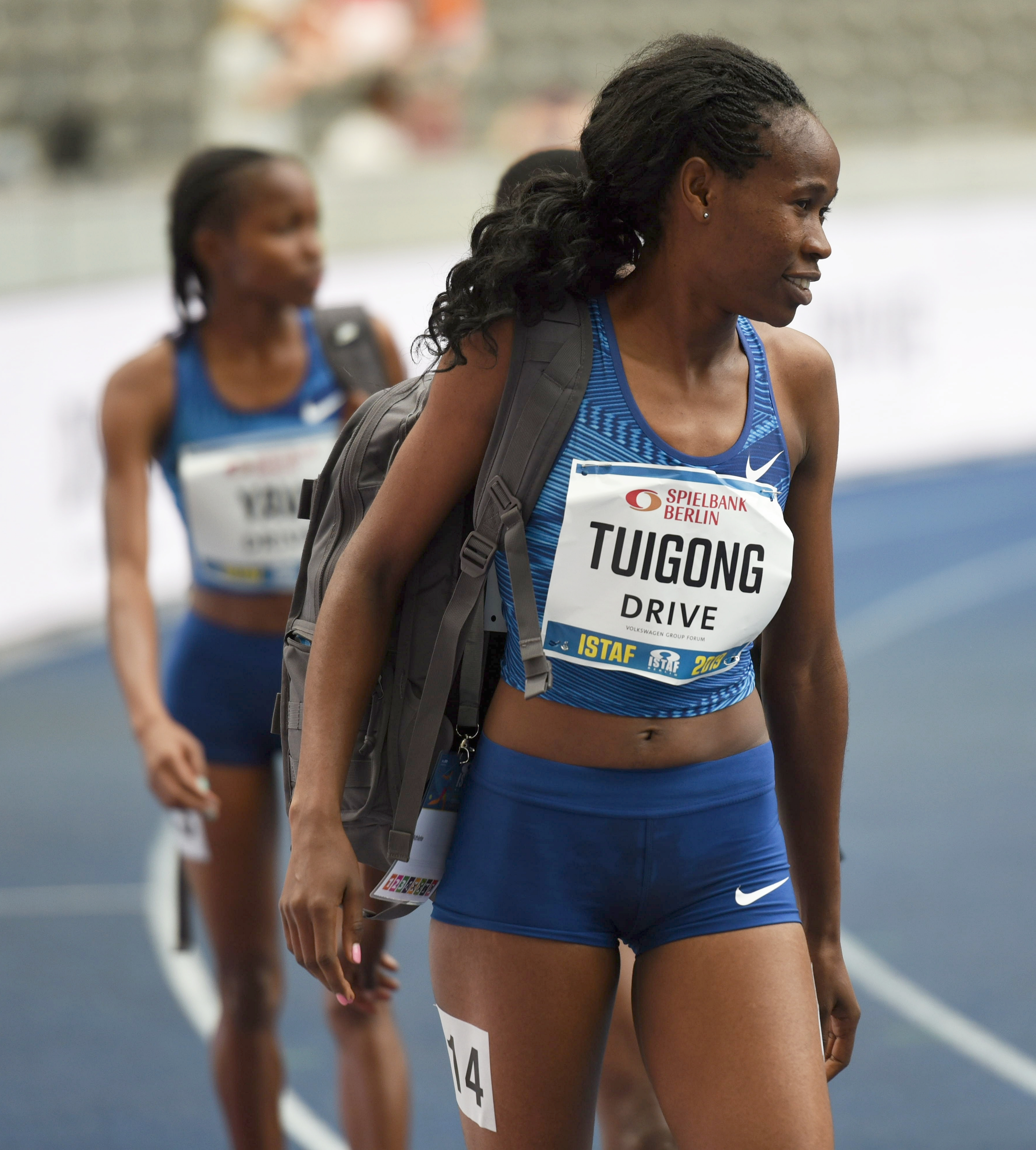
- Chepkurui at the 2019 ISTAF Berlin meeting

Personal information
- Full name: Caroline Chepkurui Tuigong
- Nationality: Kenyan
- Born: 12 March 1990 (age 36)
- Home town: Ole Nguruoni, Nakuru, Kenya
- Height: 169 cm (5 ft 6 1/2 in)
- Weight: 52 kg (115 lb)

Sport
- Sport: Athletics
- Event: 3000 metres steeplechase

Achievements and titles
- Personal bests: 2000mSC: 6:22.30 (2007); 3000mSC: 9:28.81 (2006)
Medal record
Women's athletics
Representing Kenya
World U20 Championships
Gold medal – first place	2006 Beijing	3000 m steeplechase
World Youth Championships
Gold medal – first place	2007 Ostrava	2000 m steeplechase

Caroline Chepkurui (also known as Caroline Chepkurui Tuigong, Caroline Tuigong or Caroline Tuikong; born 12 March 1990) is a Kenyan steeplechase runner. She was the 2006 World Junior and 2007 World Youth champion in the steeplechase, the former of which was done at age 16 running barefoot.

== Biography ==
In 2006, Chepkurui burst onto the scene winning the 2006 World U20 Championships title in the 3000 metres steeplechase in a championship record time of 9:40.95. The win was all the more impressive by the fact that she was only 16 years old and running barefoot, competing against a field of mostly 18 and 19 year old athletes all wearing running spikes. Her winning time was also the second-fastest U20 time ever and a personal best by over 20 seconds.

In 2007, Chepkurui won her second global gold medal at the 2007 World Youth Championships, this time competing against younger (U18) competitors over a shorter distance (the inaugural 2000 metres steeplechase). Her winning time of 6:22.30 was again the second-fastest U18 time ever.

In 2019, Chepkurui became a pacemaker for the Diamond League, including rabbiting for the 2019 Prefontaine Classic women's steeplechase.

== Statistics ==
=== Personal bests ===
Event	Mark	Competition	Venue	Date
3000 metres steeplechase	9:28.81	Rabat Diamond League	Rabat, Morocco	22 May 2016
2000 metres steeplechase	6:22.30	2007 World Youth Championships in Athletics	Ostrava, Czech Republic	14 July 2007
