= Poļina Jeļizarova =

Latvian athlete

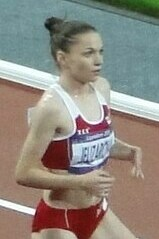
- Jeļizarova at the start of the 2012 Olympic steeplechase final

Personal information
- Nationality: Latvian
- Born: 1 May 1989 (age 36) Liepāja, Latvian SSR, Soviet Union
- Height: 1.55 m (5 ft 1 in)
- Weight: 47 kg (104 lb)

Sport
- Country: Latvia
- Sport: Track and field
- Event(s): 3000 m steeplechase, 3000 m
- Coached by: Viktors Lācis

Poļina Jeļizarova (born 1 May 1989) is a Latvian runner who specializes in the 3000 metres steeplechase. She was born in Liepāja, Latvia.

She won the gold medal at the 2005 European Junior Championships, finished fourth at the 2006 World Junior Championships, sixth at the 2008 World Junior Championships, seventh at the 2009 European U23 Championships, eleventh at the 2009 Summer Universiade, ninth at the 2011 European U23 Championships, sixth at the 2012 European Championships, thirteenth at the 2012 Summer Olympics and eighth (in the 3000 metres) at the 2013 European Indoor Championships. She reached the final, but did not finish, at the 2014 European Championships.

She is the current Latvian record holder in 3000 m steeplechase event with 9:27.21 minutes. Jeļizarova was named 2005 Rising Star of the Year in Latvia.

Awards
Preceded by None	Latvian Rising Sportspersonality of the Year; 2005	Succeeded by Ernests Gulbis
