= Almensh Belete =

Belgian long-distance runner

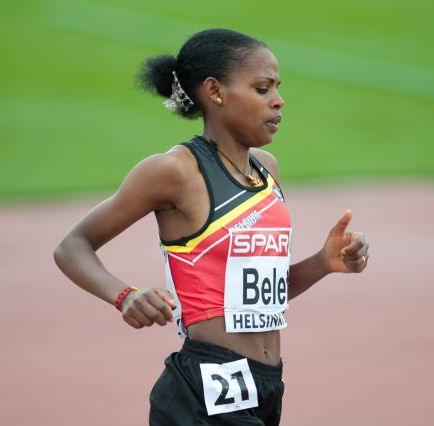
- Almensh Belete in 2012

Personal information
- Born: 26 July 1989 (age 36) Addis Ababa, People's Democratic Republic of Ethiopia (present-day Ethiopia)
- Height: 1.56 m (5 ft 1 in)
- Weight: 44 kg (97 lb)

Sport
- Sport: Athletics
- Events: 5000 m, 10,000 m
- Updated on 29 August 2015

Almensh Belete (born 26 July 1989 in Addis Ababa) is an Ethiopian-born Belgian long-distance runner. At the 2012 Summer Olympics, she competed in the Women's 5000 metres, finishing 11th in her heat and 19th overall in Round 1, failing to qualify for the final. She also represented Belgium at the 2013 and 2015 World Championships.

Her sister, Mimi Belete, is also a runner, competing internationally for Bahrain.

== International competitions ==
Year	Competition	Venue	Position	Event	Notes
Representing Belgium
2012	European Championships	Helsinki, Finland	8th	5000 m	15:22.15
2012	Olympic Games	London, United Kingdom	19th (h)	5000 m	15:10.24
2013	European Indoor Championships	Gothenburg, Sweden	5th	3000 m	9:03.89
2013	World Championships	Moscow, Russia	16th (h)	5000 m	16:03.03
2014	European Championships	Zürich, Switzerland	15th	10,000 m	33:03.87
2015	World Championships	Beijing, China	21st	10,000 m	32:47.62
2016	European Championships	Amsterdam, Netherlands	–	10,000 m	DNF

== Personal bests ==
Outdoor

- 800 metres – 2:03.88 (Liege 2010)
- 1500 metres – 4:06.87 (Heusden-Zolder 2010)
- One mile – 4:28.11 (Leuven 2012)
- 3000 metres – 8:51.70 (Rieti 2013)
- 5000 metres – 15:03.63 (Leuven 2011)
- 10,000 metres – 31:43.05 (Palo Alto 2014)

Indoor

- 1500 metres – 4:11.36 (Ghent 2013)
- 3000 metres – 8:54.14 (Eaubonne 2013)
