= 2006 European Cross Country Championships =

Coordinates: 45°34′04″N 8°54′22″E

- Organisers: EAA
- Edition: 13th
- Date: 9 December
- Host city: San Giorgio su Legnano, Italy
- Events: 6
- Distances: 9.95 km – Men; 8.03 km – Women; 8.03 km – U23 men 5.975 km – U23 women 5.975 km – Junior men 4.1 km – Junior women

The 13th European Cross Country Championships were held at San Giorgio su Legnano in Italy on 10 December 2006. Mo Farah took the title in the men's competition, while Tetyana Holovchenko won the women's race.

== Results ==
=== Men individual 9.95 km ===
Pos.	Runners	Time
1st place, gold medalist(s)	(United Kingdom) Mo Farah	27:56
2nd place, silver medalist(s)	(Spain) Juan Carlos de la Ossa	28:06
3rd place, bronze medalist(s)	(Sweden) Mustafa Mohamed	28:08
4.	(France) Khalid Zoubaa	28:16
5.	(Portugal) Rui Pedro Silva	28:17
6.	(France) Driss El Himer	28:17
7.	(France) Mustapha Essaïd	28:17
8.	(Portugal) Luís Feiteira	28:21
9.	(Switzerland) Christian Belz	28:22
10.	(Spain) Carles Castillejo	28:23
11.	(Ukraine) Serhiy Lebid	28:26
12.	(France) Driss Maazouzi	28:27

(Portugal) Fernando Silva (originally second place in 28:03) was disqualified for doping according to IAAF Rule 32.2.a. Total 64 competitors

=== Men teams ===
Pos.	Runners	Points
1st place, gold medalist(s)	France; Khalid Zoubaa; Driss El Himer; Mustapha Essaïd; Driss Maazouzi	29
2nd place, silver medalist(s)	Spain; Juan Carlos de la Ossa; Carles Castillejo; Eliseo Martín; José Manuel Martínez	40
3rd place, bronze medalist(s)	Portugal; Rui Pedro Silva; Luís Feiteira; Ricardo Ribas; Licínio Pimentel	54
4.	United Kingdom; Mo Farah; Chris Thompson; Gavin Thompson; Michael Skinner	79
5.	Italy; Gabriele de Nard; Giovanni Gualdi; Umberto Pusterla; Ruggero Pertile	89
6.	Ukraine	109
7.	Sweden	119
8.	Ireland	153

Total 10 teams

=== Women individual 8.03 km ===
Pos.	Runners	Time
1st place, gold medalist(s)	(Ukraine) Tetyana Holovchenko	25:17
2nd place, silver medalist(s)	(Russia) Mariya Konovalova	25:18
3rd place, bronze medalist(s)	(Serbia) Olivera Jevtić	25:21
4.	(Hungary) Anikó Kálovics	25:26
5.	(France) Julie Coulaud	25:28
6.	(United Kingdom) Hayley Yelling	25:28
7.	(Belgium) Nathalie De Vos	25:34
8.	(United Kingdom) Joanne Pavey	25:38
9.	(Portugal) Jessica Augusto	25:38
10.	(Portugal) Anália Rosa	25:45
11.	(Portugal) Leonor Carneiro	25:52
12.	(Spain) Rosa María Morató	25:53

Total 59 competitors

=== Women teams ===
Pos.	Runners	Points
1st place, gold medalist(s)	Portugal; Jessica Augusto; Anália Rosa; Leonor Carneiro; Mónica Rosa	47
2nd place, silver medalist(s)	United Kingdom; Hayley Yelling; Joanne Pavey; Liz Yelling; Kate Reed	47
3rd place, bronze medalist(s)	France; Julie Coulaud; Samira Chellah; Fatiha Klilech-Fauvel; Christelle Daunay	69
4.	Russia; Mariya Konovalova; Alevtina Ivanova; Inga Abitova; Marina Ivanova	88
5.	Spain; Rosa María Morató; Maria Azucena Diaz; Judith Plá; Irene Pelayo	94
6.	Italy	96
7.	Serbia	128
8.	Ireland	153

Total 9 teams

=== Men U23 individual 8.03 km ===
Pos.	Runners	Time
1st place, gold medalist(s)	(Hungary) Barnabás Bene	23:14
2nd place, silver medalist(s)	(Serbia) Dušan Markešević	23:16
3rd place, bronze medalist(s)	(Italy) Daniele Meucci	23:16
4.	(Russia) Yevgeniy Rybakov	23:17
5.	(Russia) Anatoliy Rybakov	23:22
6.	(Belarus) Stsiapan Rahautsou	23:24
7.	(Belgium) Mario Van Waeyenberghe	23:25
8.	(Russia) Aleksey Aleksandrov	23:26
9.	(Netherlands) Khalid Choukoud	23:29
10.	(Italy) Stefano la Rosa	23:29

=== Men U23 teams ===
Pos.	Runners	Points
1st place, gold medalist(s)	Russia; Yevgeniy Rybakov; Anatoliy Rybakov; Aleksey Aleksandrov; Dmitriy Nizelskiy	28
2nd place, silver medalist(s)	Italy; Daniele Meucci; Stefano La Rosa; Martin Dematteis; Luca Tocco	78
3rd place, bronze medalist(s)	Poland; Kamil Murzyn; Łukasz Parszczyński; Artur Kozłowski; Hubert Prokop	94
4.	Ireland; Joseph Sweeney; Mark Christie; Andrew Ledwith; Mick Clohisey	102
5.	United Kingdom; Andy Vernon; Tom Humphries; Andrew Baker; Tom Russell	105

=== Women U23 individual 5.975km ===
Pos.	Runners	Time
1st place, gold medalist(s)	(Turkey) Binnaz Uslu	18:47
2nd place, silver medalist(s)	(Republic of Ireland) Fionnuala Britton	18:56
3rd place, bronze medalist(s)	(Turkey) Türkan Erismis	19:09
4.	(United Kingdom) Aine Hoban	19:10
5.	(Italy) Adelina De Soccio	19:16
6.	(Russia) Viktoriya Trushenko	19:19
7.	(Netherlands) Adriënne Herzog	19:20
8.	(United Kingdom) Laura Kenney	19:23
9.	(Poland) Katarzyna Kowalska	19:24
10.	(Belgium) Anke Van Campen	19:34

=== Women U23 teams ===
Pos.	Runners	Points
1st place, gold medalist(s)	United Kingdom; Aine Hoban; Laura Kenney; Claire Holme; Faye Fullerton	56
2nd place, silver medalist(s)	Poland; Katarzyna Kowalska; Sylwia Ejdys; Marta Wojtkunska; Justyna Mudy	65
3rd place, bronze medalist(s)	Italy; Adelina De Soccio; Sara Dossena; Giorgia Robaudo; Giulia Francario	96
4.	Netherlands; Adriënne Herzog; Andrea Deelstra; Susan Kuijken; Yvonne Hak	97
5.	Turkey; Binnaz Uslu; Türkan Erismis; Dudu Karakaya; Mulkiye Yilmaz	105

=== Junior men individual 5.975km ===
Pos.	Runners	Time
1st place, gold medalist(s)	(Italy) Andrea Lalli	16:53
2nd place, silver medalist(s)	(Belarus) Siarhei Chebiarak	17:03
3rd place, bronze medalist(s)	(Romania) Ciprian Suhanea	17:06
4.	(Russia) Aleksey Popov	17:12
5.	(Italy) Simone Gariboldi	17:14

=== Junior men teams ===
Pos.	Runners	Points
1st place, gold medalist(s)	Italy; Andrea Lalli; Simone Gariboldi; Antonio Garavello; Merihun Crespi	68
2nd place, silver medalist(s)	Spain; Mohamed Elbendir; Javier García; Juan Antonio Pousa; Álvaro Lozano	74
3rd place, bronze medalist(s)	France; Noureddine Smaïl; Mourad Amdouni; David Vuste; Anthony Gauthier	74
4.	Turkey; Osman Baş; Adem Belir; Muğdat Öztürk; Ercan Muslu	83
5.	United Kingdom; Kevin Deighton; Jonathon Pepper; Lewis Timmins; Rory Fraser	97

=== Junior women individual 4.1 km ===
Pos.	Runners	Time
1st place, gold medalist(s)	(United Kingdom) Stephanie Twell	12:33
2nd place, silver medalist(s)	(Norway) Karoline Bjerkeli Grovdal	12:36
3rd place, bronze medalist(s)	(Romania) Ancuţa Bobocel	12:51
4.	(United Kingdom) Emily Pidgeon	12:59
5.	(Russia) Viktoriya Ivanova	13:08

=== Junior women teams ===
Pos.	Runners	Points
1st place, gold medalist(s)	United Kingdom; Stephanie Twell; Emily Pidgeon; Sian Edwards; Abby Westley	21
2nd place, silver medalist(s)	Russia; Viktoriya Ivanova; Tatyana Shutova; Yekaterina Gorbunova; Alfiya Khasanova	76
3rd place, bronze medalist(s)	Romania; Ancuţa Bobocel; Andreea David; Cristiana Frumuz; Daniela Donisa	83
4.	Spain; Marta Romo; Maria Sánchez; Cristina Jordan; Ainhoa Sanz	98
5.	Germany; Julia Hiller; Carolin Ähling; Mira Glocker; Cornelia Schwennen	102

== Medal table ==
Rank	Nation	Gold medal	Silver medal	Bronze medal	Total
1	United Kingdom	4	1	0	5
2	Italy	2	1	2	5
3	Russia	1	2	0	3
4	France	1	0	2	3
5	Portugal	1	0	1	2
5	Turkey	1	0	1	2
7	Ukraine	1	0	0	1
7	Hungary	1	0	0	1
9	Spain	0	3	0	3
10	Poland	0	1	1	2
10	Serbia	0	1	1	2
12	Belarus	0	1	0	1
12	Ireland	0	1	0	1
12	Norway	0	1	0	1
15	Romania	0	0	3	3
16	Sweden	0	0	1	1
Total		12	12	12	36
