= Svitlana Shmidt =

Ukrainian middle-distance runner

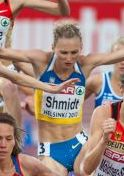
- Svitlana Shmidt in 2012

Personal information
- Native name: Світлана Володимирівна Шмідт
- Full name: Svitlana Volodymyrivna Shmidt
- Born: 20 March 1990 (age 36) Mariupol, Ukrainian SSR, Soviet Union
- Height: 1.73 m (5 ft 8 in)
- Weight: 64 kg (141 lb)

Sport
- Country: Ukraine
- Sport: Athletics
- Event: 3000 metres steeplechase
Medal record
European Championships
Disqualified	2012 Helsinki	3000m steeplechase
Universiade
Disqualified	2013 Kazan	3000m steeplechase

Svitlana Volodymyrivna Shmidt (Ukrainian: Світлана Володимирівна Шмідт; born 20 March 1990) is a former Ukrainian ahtlete who specialized in the middle-distance events.

== Doping ban ==
In April 2015 Shmidt was banned from sport for four years after IAAF found abnormal deviations in her biological passport profile. Her results from 8 March 2012 onwards were disqualified.

== Achievements ==
Year	Competition	Venue	Position	Event	Notes
Representing Ukraine
2011	European Indoor Championships	Paris, France	14th (h)	3000 m	9:43.62
2011	World Championships	Daegu, South Korea	30th (h)	3000 m s'chase	10:14.16
2012	World Indoor Championships	Istanbul, Turkey	10th	3000 m	9:03.99
2012	European Championships	Helsinki, Finland	dq	3000 m s'chase	9:33.03
2012	Olympic Games	London, United Kingdom	dq	3000 m s'chase	10:01.09
2013	Universiade	Kazan, Russia	dq	3000 m s'chase	9:40.41
2014	World Indoor Championships	Sopot, Poland	dq	3000 m	9:25.98
