= Corinna Harrer =

German middle-distance runner

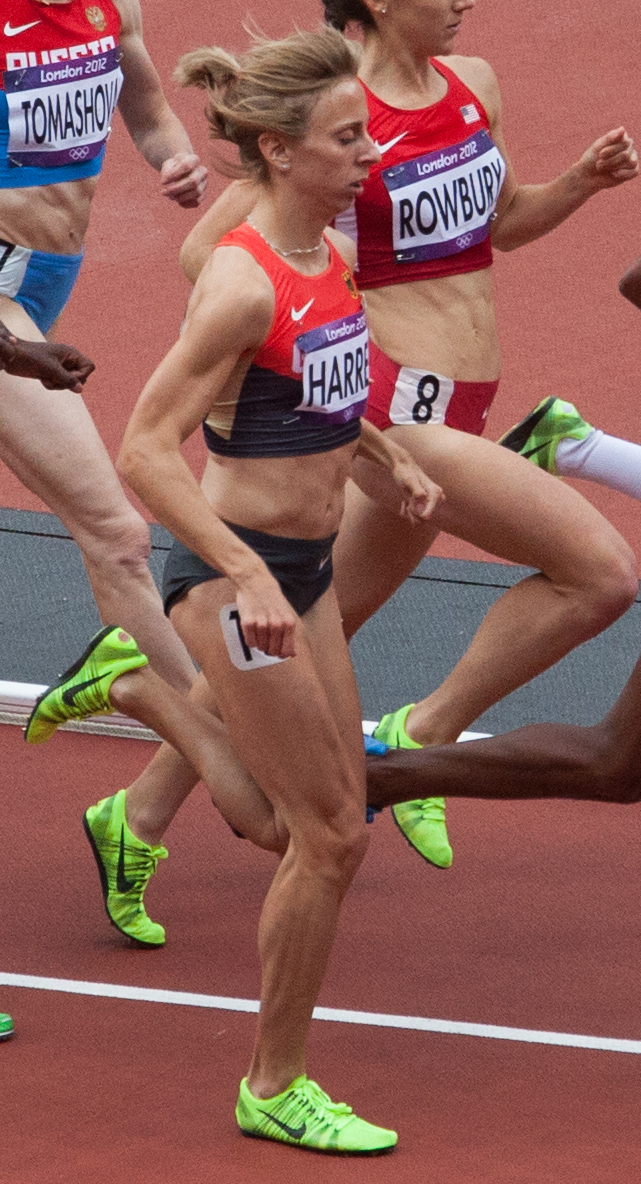
- Harrer at the 2012 Olympics

Medal record

Women's athletics

Representing Germany

European Indoor Championships
Silver medal – second place	2013 Gothenburg	3000 m

European U23 Championships
Silver medal – second place	2013 Tampere	1500 m

Corinna Harrer (born 19 January 1991) is a German middle-distance runner. She was born in Regensburg. At the 2012 Summer Olympics, she competed in the 1500 metres. She won a silver medal at the 2013 European Athletics Indoor Championships in the 3000 metres.
