= 2007 European Athletics U23 Championships – Women's 3000 metres steeplechase =

The women's 3000 metres steeplechase event at the 2007 European Athletics U23 Championships was held in Debrecen, Hungary, at Gyulai István Atlétikai Stadion on 13 and 15 July.

== Medalists ==
Gold	Katarzyna Kowalska; Poland
Silver	Ancuța Bobocel; Romania
Bronze	Sara Moreira; Portugal

== Results ==
=== Final ===
15 July

Rank	Name	Nationality	Time	Notes
1st place, gold medalist(s)	Katarzyna Kowalska	Poland	9:39.40	CR
2nd place, silver medalist(s)	Ancuța Bobocel	Romania	9:41.84	
3rd place, bronze medalist(s)	Sara Moreira	Portugal	9:42.47	
4	Verena Dreier	Germany	9:58.39	
5	Teresa Urbina	Spain	10:03.80	
6	Silje Fjørtoft	Norway	10:09.81	
7	Biljana Jović	Serbia	10:13.95	
8	Elodie Mouthon	France	10:16.39	
9	Carolin Lang	Germany	10:16.64	
10	Oksana Juravel	Moldova	10:22.72	
11	Iryna Bakhanouskaia	Belarus	10:23.34	
	Julia Hiller	Germany	DNF	

=== Heats ===
13 July
Qualified: first 4 in each heat and 4 best to the Final

==== Heat 1 ====
Rank	Name	Nationality	Time	Notes
1	Elodie Mouthon	France	9:55.19	Q
2	Katarzyna Kowalska	Poland	9:56.01	Q
3	Teresa Urbina	Spain	9:57.86	Q
4	Verena Dreier	Germany	9:58.74	Q
5	Oksana Juravel	Moldova	10:02.09	q
6	Iryna Bakhanouskaia	Belarus	10:02.63	q
7	Carolin Lang	Germany	10:17.99	q
8	Selien de Schryder	Belgium	10:28.86	
9	Laura Azevedo	Portugal	11:01.67	
	Elpida Christodoulidou	Cyprus	DNF	

==== Heat 2 ====
Rank	Name	Nationality	Time	Notes
1	Ancuța Bobocel	Romania	10:01.50	Q
2	Biljana Jović	Serbia	10:02.24	Q
3	Sara Moreira	Portugal	10:02.27	Q
4	Julia Hiller	Germany	10:06.05	Q
5	Silje Fjørtoft	Norway	10:10.85	q
6	Lizzy Hall	Great Britain	10:24.34	
7	Catia Libertone	Italy	10:29.25	
8	Iwona Lewandowska	Poland	10:35.98	
9	Lenka Ptáčková	Czech Republic	11:00.30	
	Aslı Çakır	Turkey	DNS	

== Participation ==
According to an unofficial count, 19 athletes from 15 countries participated in the event.

- Belarus (1)
- Belgium (1)
- Cyprus (1)
- Czech Republic (1)
- France (1)
- Germany (3)
- Great Britain (1)
- Italy (1)
- Moldova (1)
- Norway (1)
- Poland (2)
- Portugal (2)
- Romania (1)
- Serbia (1)
- Spain (1)
