= Fionnuala McCormack =

Irish runner (born 1984)

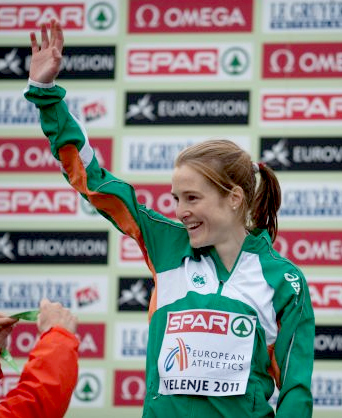
- McCormack at the 2011 European Cross Country Championships in Velenje, Slovenia

Personal information
- Born: 24 September 1984 (age 41) Wicklow, Ireland
- Height: 1.57 m (5 ft 2 in)
- Weight: 43 kg (95 lb)
Medal record
Women's athletics
Representing Ireland
European Indoor Championships
Bronze medal – third place	2013 Gothenburg	3000 m
European Cross Country Championships
Gold medal – first place	2011 Velenje	Individual
Gold medal – first place	2012 Budapest	Individual
Gold medal – first place	2012 Budapest	Team
Bronze medal – third place	2014 Samokov	Team
Bronze medal – third place	2015 Hyères	Team

Fionnuala McCormack (née Britton; born 24 September 1984 in Wicklow) is an Irish runner who has competed at a range of distance running events. She was the gold medallist at the 2011 and 2012 European Cross Country Championships, becoming the first woman to successfully defend the title. She has represented Ireland in the steeplechase at the 2008 Beijing Olympics and 2012 London Olympics, the 2007 World Championships in Athletics and 2011 World Championships in Athletics, and twice at the European Athletics Championships.

== Career ==
She began her international junior career in cross country running in 2001, highlighted by 33rd place at the 2003 IAAF World Cross Country Championships in her debut championships in Lausanne. She won a steeplechase silver at the 2006 European Cup and also competed in the event at the European Athletics Championships, being eliminated in the heats. She took the under-23 silver medal at the 2006 European Cross Country Championships at the end of the year. She was fourteenth in the senior race at the 2007 IAAF World Cross Country Championships – the second best European performer behind Jessica Augusto (12th). She made her global track debut at the 2007 World Championships in Athletics and was twelfth in the steeplechase final. She ended the year with a seventh-place finish at the 2007 European Cross Country Championships.

She made her Olympic debut at the 2008 Summer Games in Beijing, but did not make the women's steeplechase final. She came eleventh at the 2009 European Cross Country Championships which was held in her home city of Dublin. Britton was also eleventh in the steeplechase final at the 2010 European Athletics Championships. She just missed out on a medal at the 2010 European Cross Country Championships, finishing with the same time as bronze medallist Ana Dulce Félix. She took second place at the Lotto Cross Cup Brussels a week later.

In preparation for the world competition, she ran at the Almond Blossom Cross Country in March 2011 and took second place. She managed 16th place at the 2011 IAAF World Cross Country Championships in Punta Umbría. She ran a personal best of 15:31.26 minutes for the 5000 metres at the FBK Games in June then ran a steeplechase best of 9:37.60 minutes at the Adidas Grand Prix in New York. Britton represented Ireland on the track at the 2011 World Championships in Athletics, narrowly being eliminated in the first stage of the steeplechase. In November she came third at the high-level Cross de l'Acier cross country race. In December 2011, she won the gold medal at the 2011 European Cross Country Championships.

She began 2012 with wins at the Great Edinburgh Cross Country and Antrim Cross Country. She expressed her disappointment that the World Cross Country would not be held that year, and stated that she would focus on track running that year instead. In December of that year she became the first woman to defend the continental cross title claiming victory at the 2012 European Cross Country Championships.

In January 2013, Britton retained her Great Edinburgh Cross Country and Antrim Cross Country titles.

On 3 March 2013, she won a bronze medal in the 3000 metres final at the 2013 European Athletics Indoor Championships in Gothenburg. She placed 13th at the 2013 IAAF World Cross Country Championships, being Europe's top performer in the race and one of only two non-Africans in the top 15 (alongside Neely Spence). She competed mainly in European competitions in the following two seasons, coming fourth at the 2013 European Cross Country Championships, ranking eighth in the 10,000 m at the 2014 European Athletics Championships, then ending in sixth at the 2014 European Cross Country Championships (and taking a team bronze).

She married in 2015 and began competing as Fionnuala McCormack. Her first success under her married name was a team bronze at the 2015 European Cross Country Championships, where she narrowly missed an individual medal in fourth place behind Karoline Bjerkeli Grøvdal. She finished 5th in the 2019 Chicago Marathon.

In 2019, she competed in the senior women's race at the 2019 IAAF World Cross Country Championships held in Aarhus, Denmark. She finished in 18th place.

In December 2022, she qualified for the 2024 Summer Olympics, making her the first Irish woman to participate at five Olympic Games.

In December 2024 she ran her personal best of 2:23:46 in Valencia at the age of 40.

She finished in 10th place at the 2025 New York City Marathon with a time of 2:27:00, winning the masters division prize of $3,000.

== International competitions ==
Year	Competition	Venue	Position	Event	Notes
Representing Ireland
2005	European U23 Championships	Erfurt, Germany	9th	3000 m st.	10:17.58
2005	Universiade	İzmir, Turkey	11th	3000 m st.	10:28.37
2006	European Championships	Gothenburg, Sweden	17th (h)	3000 m st.	9:49.20
2006	European Cross Country Championships	San Giorgio su Legnano, Italy	2nd	Under-23 race (5.975 km)	18:56
2007	World Cross Country Championships	Mombasa, Kenya	13th	Senior race (8 km)	28:45
2007	World Championships	Osaka, Japan	12th	3000 m st.	9:48.09
2008	World University Cross Country Championships	Haute Normandie – Rouen, France	2nd	Under-23	22:39
2008	Olympic Games	Beijing, China	10th	3000 m st.	9:43.57
2009	Universiade	Belgrade, Serbia	6th	3000 m st.	9:54.10
2010	European Championships	Barcelona, Spain	11th	3000 m st.	9:45.25
2011	World Championships	Daegu, South Korea	9th	3000 m st.	9:41.17
2011	European Cross Country Championships	Velenje, Slovenia	1st	Senior race (8.170 km)	25:55
2012	European Championships	Helsinki, Finland	4th	10000 m	32:05.54
2012	Olympic Games	London, England	12th	10,000 m	31:14.75
2012	Olympic Games	London, England	8th	5000 m	15:08.57
2012	European Cross Country Championships	Budapest, Hungary	1st	Senior race (8.050 km)	27:45
2013	European Indoor Championships	Gothenburg, Sweden	3rd	3000m	9:00.54
2013	World Cross Country Championships	Bydgoszcz, Poland	14th	Senior Race (8 km)	25:08
2013	European Cross Country Championships	Belgrade, Serbia	5th	Senior race (8.050 km)	26:45
2014	European Championships	Zurich, Switzerland	10th	Marathon	2:31:46
2015	European Cross Country Championships	Hyères, France	4th	Senior race	26:00
2015	European Cross Country Championships	Hyères, France	3rd	Team race	83 pts
2016	European Championships	Amsterdam, Netherlands	5th	10,000 m	31:30.74
2016	Olympic Games	Rio de Janeiro, Brazil	20th	Marathon	2:29.58
2021	Olympic Games	Sapporo, Japan	25th	Marathon	2:34:09
2024	Olympic Games	Paris, France	28th	Marathon	2:30:12
2025	World Championships	Tokyo, Japan	9th	Marathon	2:30:16
2026	European Championships	Birmingham, United Kingdom	–	Marathon	DNF

== Personal bests ==
- 1500 metres – 4:08.35 min (2011)
- 3000 metres – 8:55.12 min (2012)
- 3000 metres indoor – 8:53.47 min (2013)
- 5000 metres – 15:08.69 min (2012)
- 10,000 metres – 31:18.25 min (2012)
- 3000 metres steeplechase – 9:17.60 min (2011)
- Marathon – 2 hrs 23:46 min (2024)
