= 2004 World Junior Championships in Athletics – Women's 3000 metres steeplechase =

The women's 3000 metres steeplechase event at the 2004 World Junior Championships in Athletics was held in Grosseto, Italy, at Stadio Olimpico Carlo Zecchini on 13 and 15 July.

== Medalists ==
Gold	Gladys Jerotich Kipkemoi; Kenya
Silver	Ancuța Bobocel; Romania
Bronze	Cătălina Oprea; Romania

== Results ==
=== Final ===
15 July

Rank	Name	Nationality	Time	Notes
1st place, gold medalist(s)	Gladys Jerotich Kipkemoi	Kenya	9:47.26	
2nd place, silver medalist(s)	Ancuța Bobocel	Romania	9:49.03	
3rd place, bronze medalist(s)	Cătălina Oprea	Romania	9:50.04	
4	Mercy Njoroge	Kenya	9:52.25	
5	Verena Dreier	Germany	9:59.33	
6	Biljana Jovic	Serbia and Montenegro	10:06.96	
7	Zenaide Vieira	Brazil	10:10.84	
8	Olga Derevyeva	Russia	10:18.50	
9	Yuliya Mochalova	Russia	10:20.96	
10	Aleisha Anderson	Australia	10:24.60	
11	Teresa Urbina	Spain	10:36.43	
	Aslı Çakır	Turkey	DQ	IAAF rule 32.2

=== Heats ===
13 July

==== Heat 1 ====
Rank	Name	Nationality	Time	Notes
1	Yuliya Mochalova	Russia	10:09.83	Q
2	Zenaide Vieira	Brazil	10:10.66	Q
3	Ancuța Bobocel	Romania	10:13.30	q
4	Teresa Urbina	Spain	10:26.89	q
5	Amber Harper	United States	10:32.96	
6	Clémence Orhant	France	10:58.76	
7	Claire Percival	Canada	11:02.86	
8	Angelika Stanek	Poland	11:07.80	
9	Laura Azevedo	Portugal	11:11.60	
10	Valentina Ghiazza	Italy	11:15.20	
11	Jana Stykova	Slovakia	11:20.31	
12	Tatjana Jatsenko	Estonia	11:53.30	
13	Ivana Sánchez	Argentina	12:13.28	
	Judit Wágenhoffer	Hungary	DNF	
	Aslı Çakır	Turkey	DQ	IAAF rule 32.2 Q

==== Heat 2 ====
Rank	Name	Nationality	Time	Notes
1	Gladys Jerotich Kipkemoi	Kenya	10:13.25	Q
2	Cătălina Oprea	Romania	10:26.16	Q
3	Olga Derevyeva	Russia	10:31.25	Q
4	Katarzyna Kowalska	Poland	10:35.22	
5	Pippa Hendon	Australia	10:41.24	
6	Selina Sekulic	United States	10:50.03	
7	Sanae Achahbar	Morocco	10:52.46	
8	Andreia Santos	Portugal	10:52.67	
9	Meredith McGregor	Canada	10:54.17	
10	Ánna Thalassinoú	Greece	10:56.53	
11	Paola Bernardi Locatelli	Italy	11:12.64	
12	Wanda Sánchez	Spain	11:12.68	
13	Saara Skyttä	Finland	11:21.11	
14	Mapaseka Makhanya	South Africa	11:44.70	
15	Evgenia Korkokiou	Cyprus	11:54.72	

==== Heat 3 ====
Rank	Name	Nationality	Time	Notes
1	Mercy Njoroge	Kenya	10:16.70	Q
2	Biljana Jovic	Serbia and Montenegro	10:18.26	Q
3	Verena Dreier	Germany	10:19.52	Q
4	Aleisha Anderson	Australia	10:27.44	q
5	Selien De Schryder	Belgium	10:28.52	
6	Masello Moekoa	South Africa	10:38.77	
7	Emilie Paumard	France	10:52.90	
8	Linda Byrne	Ireland	10:59.34	
9	Sabine Heitling	Brazil	11:01.09	
10	Viktória Madarász	Hungary	11:05.55	
11	Laila Daoud	Morocco	11:10.36	
12	Mojca Lindic	Slovenia	11:13.05	
13	Dudu Karakaya	Turkey	11:16.25	
14	Marja-Leena Kurki	Finland	11:22.31	
15	Isabel Lobos	Chile	12:03.62	

== Participation ==
According to an unofficial count, 45 athletes from 28 countries participated in the event.

- Argentina (1)
- Australia (2)
- Belgium (1)
- Brazil (2)
- Canada (2)
- Chile (1)
- Cyprus (1)
- Estonia (1)
- Finland (2)
- France (2)
- Germany (1)
- Greece (1)
- Hungary (2)
- Ireland (1)
- Italy (2)
- Kenya (2)
- Morocco (2)
- Poland (2)
- Portugal (2)
- Romania (2)
- Russia (2)
- Serbia and Montenegro (1)
- Slovakia (1)
- Slovenia (1)
- South Africa (2)
- Spain (2)
- Turkey (2)
- United States (2)
