= 2006 World Junior Championships in Athletics – Women's 3000 metres steeplechase =

The women's 3000 metres steeplechase event at the 2006 World Junior Championships in Athletics was held in Beijing, China, at Chaoyang Sports Centre on 15 and 17 August.

== Medalists ==
Gold	Caroline Chepkurui; Kenya
Silver	Ancuța Bobocel; Romania
Bronze	Mekdes Bekele; Ethiopia

== Results ==
=== Final ===
17 August

Rank	Name	Nationality	Time	Notes
1st place, gold medalist(s)	Caroline Chepkurui	Kenya	9:40.95	
2nd place, silver medalist(s)	Ancuța Bobocel	Romania	9:46.19	
3rd place, bronze medalist(s)	Mekdes Bekele	Ethiopia	9:48.67	
4	Poļina Jeļizarova	Latvia	9:58.76	
5	Karoline Grøvdal	Norway	10:00.44	
6	Beatrice Kiprop	Kenya	10:10.99	
7	Julia Hiller	Germany	10:11.67	
8	Amy Fowler	United States	10:11.73	
9	Ruth Senior	United Kingdom	10:13.58	
10	Marie Lawrence	United States	10:17.84	
11	Sabine Heitling	Brazil	10:28.32	
12	Zsófia Erdélyi	Hungary	10:41.71	

=== Heats ===
15 August

==== Heat 1 ====
Rank	Name	Nationality	Time	Notes
1	Mekdes Bekele	Ethiopia	9:46.67	Q
2	Caroline Chepkurui	Kenya	9:51.94	Q
3	Poļina Jeļizarova	Latvia	10:08.64	Q
4	Ruth Senior	United Kingdom	10:12.50	Q
5	Julia Hiller	Germany	10:18.16	q
6	Marie Lawrence	United States	10:22.85	q
7	Natalya Kovtun	Ukraine	10:31.31	
8	Elena Arzhakova	Russia	10:35.06	
9	Sarah Grahame	Australia	10:42.08	
10	Solange Jesús	Portugal	10:44.24	
11	Lena Örn	Sweden	10:44.39	
12	Dionisía Kouboúli	Greece	10:51.75	
13	Suvi Miettinen	Finland	11:00.21	
14	Yamina Mescari	Algeria	11:03.92	
15	Jasmina Delic	Bosnia and Herzegovina	11:05.42	
16	Ruth Croft	New Zealand	11:17.35	
17	Mónika Nagy	Hungary	11:42.57	

==== Heat 2 ====
Rank	Name	Nationality	Time	Notes
1	Karoline Grøvdal	Norway	10:11.96	Q
2	Beatrice Kiprop	Kenya	10:12.89	Q
3	Ancuța Bobocel	Romania	10:13.12	Q
4	Amy Fowler	United States	10:18.54	Q
5	Sabine Heitling	Brazil	10:24.44	q
6	Zsófia Erdélyi	Hungary	10:26.82	q
7	Elodie Mouthon	France	10:33.26	
8	Samira Latamna	Algeria	10:37.01	
9	Danelle Woods	Canada	10:38.84	
10	Saara Skyttä	Finland	10:39.56	
11	Hulya Ongun	Turkey	10:40.14	
12	Qie Liping	China	10:44.02	
13	Nežka Pori	Slovenia	10:54.55	
14	Giulia Basoli	Italy	11:07.62	
15	Marta Quintana	Spain	11:20.45	
16	Melissa Murrihy	New Zealand	11:43.03	
	Destiny Tities	South Africa	DNF	

== Participation ==
According to an unofficial count, 34 athletes from 28 countries participated in the event.

- Algeria (2)
- Australia (1)
- Bosnia and Herzegovina (1)
- Brazil (1)
- Canada (1)
- China (1)
- Ethiopia (1)
- Finland (2)
- France (1)
- Germany (1)
- Greece (1)
- Hungary (2)
- Italy (1)
- Kenya (2)
- Latvia (1)
- New Zealand (2)
- Norway (1)
- Portugal (1)
- Romania (1)
- Russia (1)
- Slovenia (1)
- South Africa (1)
- Spain (1)
- Sweden (1)
- Turkey (1)
- Ukraine (1)
- United Kingdom (1)
- United States (2)
