= Cezmi Or Memorial =

- Date: June
- Location: Sadi Gülçelik Stadium, Istanbul, Turkey
- Event type: Track and field
- Established: 1945

The Cezmi Or Memorial (Turkish: Uluslararası Cezmi Or Kupası) is an annual track and field meeting which takes place in Istanbul, Turkey.

The meeting is held in honour of late Turkish sprinter Cezmi Or, who set Turkish records in the men's 100 metres and 200 metres, but died of typhoid fever in 1945 at the age of 24. The memorial meeting was first held one year after his death and has continued annually without interruption. It is held under the auspices of the Turkish Athletic Federation and Can Korkmazoğlu is the current meet organiser.

The competition, which is undertaken at the Enka Sadi Gülçelik Stadium, Stadium holds Classic Meeting status from the continental governing body, European Athletics. Both international and Turkish athletes compete in the meetings events. At the 2005 edition of the competition, Turkish hammer thrower Eşref Apak set the current national record of 81.45 metres for the event, which is also the meet record.

== Meeting records ==
=== Men ===
Men's meeting records of the Cezmi Or Memorial
Event	Record	Athlete	Nationality	Date	Ref.
100 m	10.08	Ramil Guliyev	Azerbaijan	13 June 2009	
200 m	20.32	Ramil Guliyev	Azerbaijan	11 June 2011	
400 m	45.76	Ibrahima Wade	Senegal	19 June 1999	
800 m	1:47.22	Kamel Boulahfane	Algeria	19 June 1999	
1500 m	3:41.27	Dmitrijs Jurkevičs	Latvia	8 June 2013	
3000 m	7:57.96	Samir Moussaoui	Algeria	19 June 1999	
5000 m	13:29.85	Abayneh Ayele	Ethiopia	11 June 2011	
3000 m steeplechase	8:20.08	Birhan Getahun	Ethiopia	9 June 2012	
110 m hurdles	13.71	Damjan Zlatnar	Slovenia	30 June 2007	
400 m hurdles	49.40	Danny McFarlane	Jamaica	7 June 2003	
High jump	2.31 m	Dragutin Topić	Serbia and Montenegro	7 June 2003	
Pole vault	5.51 m	Ruhan Işım	Turkey	20 June 1998	
Long jump	8.13 m	Andriy Makarchev	Ukraine	28 June 2008	
Triple jump	17.20 m	Lenis Stamatis	Greece	24 June 2000	
Shot put	20.85 m	Pavel Lyzhyn	Belarus	3 June 2006	
Discus throw	63.86 m	Ludvík Daněk	Czech Republic	1975	
Hammer throw	81.45 m	Eşref Apak	Turkey	5 June 2005	
Javelin throw	82.48 m	Fatih Avan	Turkey	11 June 2011	
10,000 m walk (track)	45:58.7	Abdülkadir Öz	Turkey	15 July 1995	
4 × 100 m relay	40.48	Matic Sustercic; Matej Junhart; Rok Predanic; Matic Osovnikar	Slovenia	16 June 2001	

=== Women ===
Women's meeting records of the Cezmi Or Memorial
Event	Record	Athlete	Nationality	Date	Ref.
100 m	11.26	Irina Pukha	Ukraine	19 June 1999	
200 m	23.08 (+0.5 m/s)	Viktoriya Pyatachenko	Ukraine	9 June 2012	
400 m	51.43	Vania Stambolova	Bulgaria	11 June 2011	
800 m	2:00.42	Tatyana Paliyenko	Russia	9 June 2012	
1500 m	4:06.97	Alemitu Bekele Degfa	Turkey	12 June 2010	
3000 m	9:22.78	Esma Aydemir	Turkey	13 June 2015	
5000 m	15:18.81	Waganesh Mekasha	Ethiopia	9 June 2012	
100 m hurdles	12.76	Nevin Yanit	Turkey	28 June 2008	
400 m hurdles	54.33	Vania Stambolova	Bulgaria	11 June 2011	
3000 m steeplechase	9:28.84	Türkan Erişmiş	Turkey	13 June 2009	
High jump	1.98 m	Venelina Veneva	Bulgaria	5 June 2005	
Pole vault	4.30 m	Tatiana Grigorieva	Australia	19 June 1999	
Pole vault	4.30 m	Tanya Koleva	Bulgaria	24 June 2000	
Pole vault	4.30 m	Buse Arıkazan	Turkey	10 June 2018	
Long jump	4.30 m	Elena Khlopotnova	Ukraine	20 June 1998	
Triple jump	14.55 m	Natalya Kutyakova	Russia	12 June 2010	
Shot put	19.48 m	Jillian Camarena-Williams	United States	11 June 2011	
Discus throw	62.95 m	Nicoleta Grasu	Romania	3 June 2006	
Hammer throw	68.07 m	Kıvılcım Salman Kaya	Turkey	10 June 2018	
Javelin throw	47.08 m	Sahar Ziaei	Iran	10 June 2018	
5000 m walk (track)	20:29.63	Claudia Iovan	Romania	19 June 1999	
4 × 100 m relay	45.37	Burcu Şentürk; Nora Güner; Anzhela Atroshchenko; Aksel Gürcan	Turkey	8 June 2002	
