= 2009 European Athletics U23 Championships – Women's 3000 metres steeplechase =

The women's 3000 metres steeplechase event at the 2009 European Athletics U23 Championships was held in Kaunas, Lithuania, at S. Dariaus ir S. Girėno stadionas (Darius and Girėnas Stadium) on 19 July.

== Medalists ==
Gold	Ancuța Bobocel; Romania
Silver	Julia Hiller; Germany
Bronze	Susi Lutz; Germany

== Results ==
=== Final ===
19 July

Rank	Name	Nationality	Time	Notes
1st place, gold medalist(s)	Ancuța Bobocel	Romania	9:47.90	
2nd place, silver medalist(s)	Julia Hiller	Germany	9:57.44	
3rd place, bronze medalist(s)	Susi Lutz	Germany	10:01.87	
4	Sandra Eriksson	Finland	10:11.25	
5	Gülcan Mıngır	Turkey	10:12.53	
6	Lena Örn	Sweden	10:23.00	
7	Poļina Jeļizarova	Latvia	10:23.17	
8	Yuliya Mochalova	Russia	10:29.03	
9	Solange Jesus	Portugal	10:31.98	
10	Saara Skyttä	Finland	10:33.19	
11	Lāsma Grīnberga	Latvia	10:35.77	
12	Silje Fjørtoft	Norway	10:53.25	
13	Gintarė Kubiliūtė	Lithuania	11:15.19	
	Olga Tarantinova	Russia	DNF	

== Participation ==
According to an unofficial count, 14 athletes from 10 countries participated in the event.

- Finland (2)
- Germany (2)
- Latvia (2)
- Lithuania (1)
- Norway (1)
- Portugal (1)
- Romania (1)
- Russia (2)
- Sweden (1)
- Turkey (1)
