= Daneja Grandovec =

Slovenian long-distance runner

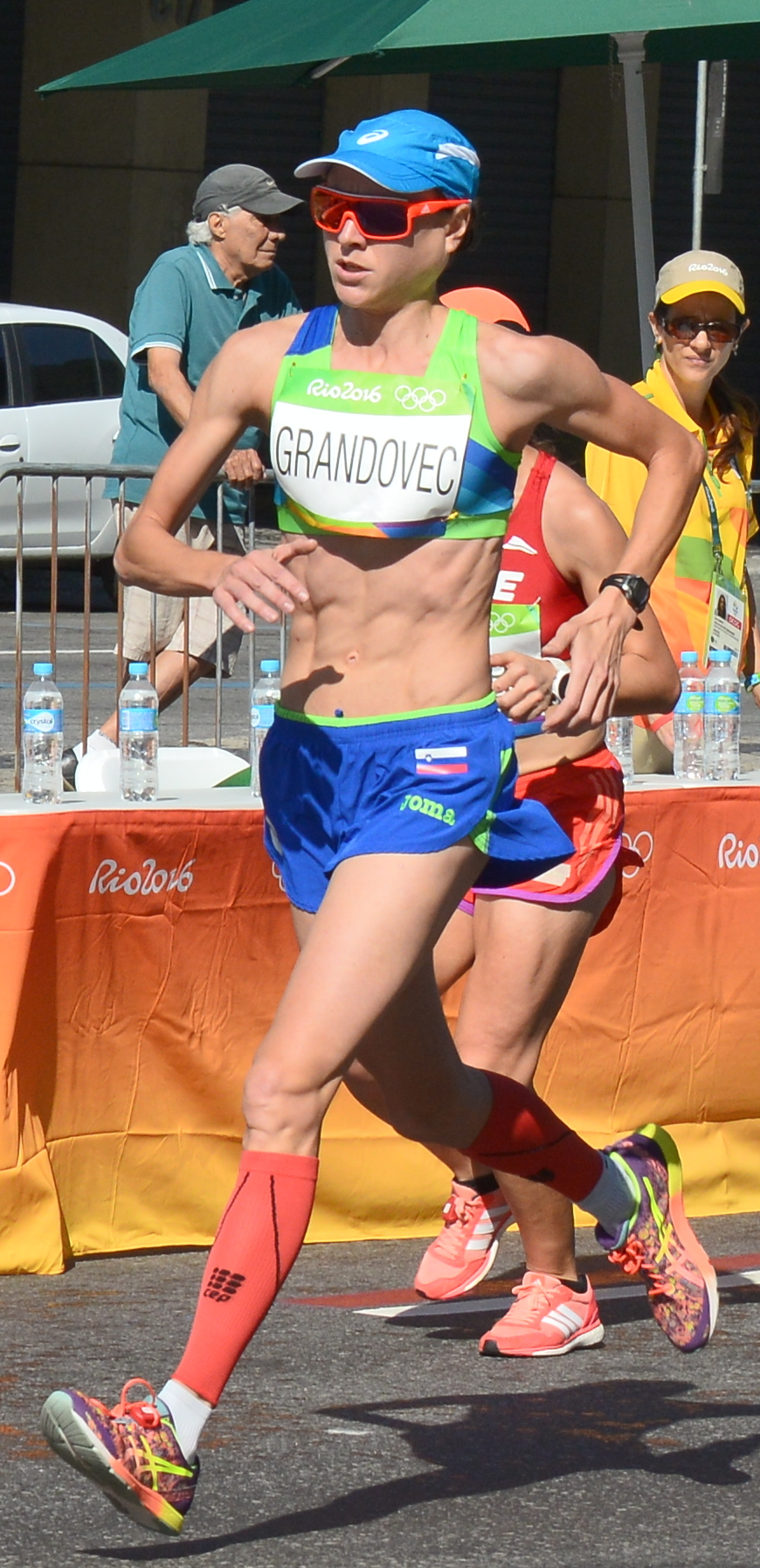
- Grandovec at the 2016 Olympics

Personal information
- Born: 2 July 1984 (age 42) Maribor, Slovenia
- Height: 175 cm (5 ft 9 in)
- Weight: 58 kg (128 lb)

Sport
- Sport: Athletics
- Events: Steeplechase, 10,000 m, half marathon, marathon
- Club: AD Stajerska Maribor
- Coached by: Igor Salamun

Achievements and titles
- Personal bests: 3000 mS – 10:03.33 (2005); 10,000 m – 37:20.21 (2005); HM – 1:20:19 (2010); Marathon – 2:40:23 (2015)

Daneja Grandovec (born 2 July 1984) is a Slovenian long-distance runner. She competes in marathons, steeplechase and mountain running.

In 2005, Grandovec finished sixth in the women's 3000 metres steeplechase at the 2005 European Athletics U23 Championships.

She has won the 2005 Ljubljana Marathon and the 2010 Three Hearts Marathon.

Grandovec finished 33rd at the women's marathon at the 2010 European Athletics Championships.

She finished 46th, as the last finisher, at the women's marathon at the 2013 World Championships in Athletics.

In 2015, she competed in the Valencia Marathon and finished with a time that is lower than the qualifying standard for the 2016 Olympics.

She has also competed in the European Mountain Running Championships.
