= Sanaa Koubaa =

German steeplechase runner

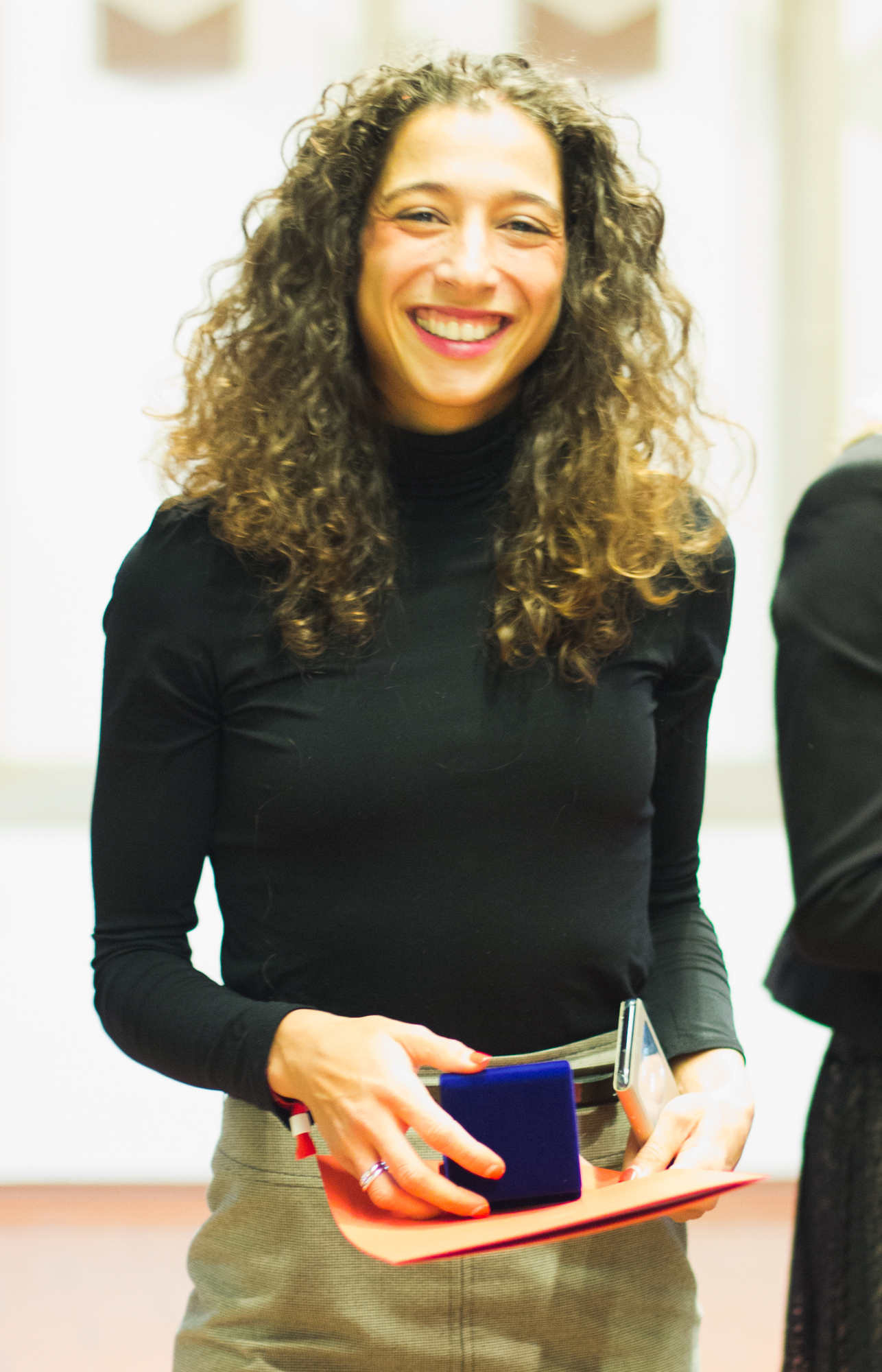
- Sanaa Koubaa in 2016

Personal information
- Born: 6 January 1985 (age 41) Langenfeld, West Germany
- Height: 1.70 m (5 ft 7 in)
- Weight: 56 kg (123 lb)

Sport
- Sport: Athletics
- Event: 3000 m steeplechase
- Club: TSV Bayer 04 Leverkusen
- Coached by: Paul-Heinz Wellmann

Sanaa Koubaa (born 6 January 1985 in Langenfeld) is a German athlete competing in the 3000 metres steeplechase. She represented her country at the 2016 Summer Olympics without qualifying for the final.

== International competitions ==
Year	Competition	Venue	Position	Event	Notes
Representing Germany
2012	European; Championships	Helsinki, Finland	13th	3000 m s'chase	10:02.33
2016	Olympic Games	Rio de Janeiro, Brazil	27th (h)	3000 m s'chase	9:35.15

== Personal bests ==
Outdoor

- 1500 metres – 4:13.48 (Leuven 2016)
- 3000 metres – 9:20.65 (Bergisch Gladbach 2015)
- 5000 metres – 16:40.42 (Koblenz 2011)
- 3000 metres steeplechase – 9:35.15 (Rio de Janeiro 2016)

Indoor

- 1500 metres – 4:27.00 (Leverkusen 2012)
- 3000 metres – 9:30.87 (Leverkusen 2012)
