= Stephanie Reilly =

Irish long-distance runner

Stephanie Reilly (née O'Reilly; born 23 February 1978) is an Irish long distance runner who competed at the 2012 Summer Olympics in the 3000 metres steeplechase.

== Life ==
Reilly was born on 23 February 1978 in Dublin.

== Running career ==
She went to Providence College in Rhode Island, United States on an athletic scholarship in 1997. A 2001 Graduate of Providence, she was a member of two New England Championship Teams in 1998 and 1999 and one BIG EAST Conference Championship team in 1997. Named Indoor Track Team Captain in 2000 and Outdoor Captain in 2001, she was an NCAA provisional qualifier in the 3000 meters in 1998. In 2004, she received her master's degree in Guidance and Counseling from Providence College.

Reilly's success at an International Level continued into 2011 with a strong performance at the New York Diamond League, running Running a PB of 9:42:91 in the 3000m Steeplechase achieving both an A Standard for both the IAAF 2011 World Championships in Daegu & more importantly the 2012 Olympic Games in London. She now has 3 children, Marcus, Dylan, and Luke.

Reilly qualified for the 2012 Summer Olympics in the 3000 metres steeplechase. She finished 27th out of 44 runners in the initial heats, and did not qualify for the final.

== Achievements ==
Year	Competition	Venue	Position	Event	Notes
Representing Ireland
2010	European Championships	Barcelona, Spain	10th (H)	3000 m s'chase	
2011	World Championships	Daegu, South Korea	8th (H)	3000 m s'chase	
2012	European Championships	Helsinki, Finland	12th (F)	3000 m s'chase	
2012	Summer Olympics	London, United Kingdom	9th (H)	3000 m s'chase	

== Coaching ==
Reilly began her first year as interim head men's and women's cross country and track & field coach at Bryant University in 2007–08, having previously served as an assistant coach during the 2006–07 season. After serving as the interim head coach for the 2007–08 season, she was appointed Head Coach of the Bryant Men's and Women's Cross Country / Track and Field Teams in July, 2008.

Reilly followed up her Olympic experience with a record setting 2012–13 season for the Bryant Bulldogs. It started in the fall as Reilly engineered one of the best seasons in Bulldog cross country history at the DI level. She led the women's cross country team to a third-place team finish on her way to Northeast Conference Coach of the Year honors. This momentum carried the Bulldogs into the track and field seasons where Reilly's squad rewrote the record book. In all, the Bulldogs set 13 school records during the indoor and outdoor track and field seasons.

Reilly is now the men's and women's cross country head coach and associate long distance coach for track & field at College of the Holy Cross in Worcester, MA.
