= Gülcan Mıngır =

Turkish middle-distance runner (born 1989)

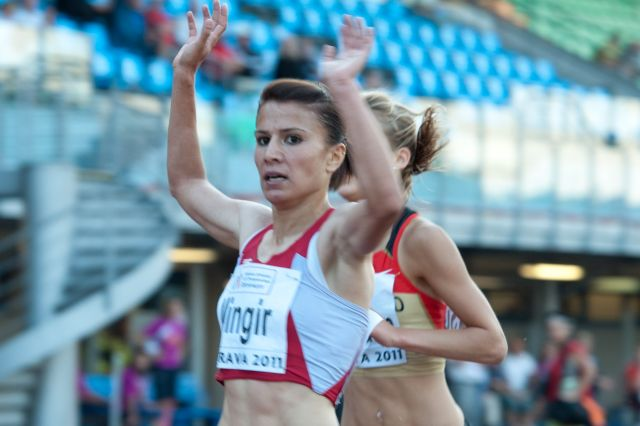

Personal information
- Nationality: Turkish
- Born: 21 May 1989 (age 37) Döğer, İhsaniye, Afyonkarahisar, Turkey
- Height: 1.65 m (5 ft 5 in)
- Weight: 53 kg (117 lb)

Sport
- Sport: Middle-distance
- Club: Üsküdar Belediyespor
- Coached by: İhsan Alptekin

Achievements and titles
- Personal best: 3000 m st: 9:32.96 (2012)
Medal record
Women's athletics
Representing Turkey
European Athletics U23 Championships
Gold medal – first place	2011 Ostrava	3000 m st
European Athletics Championships
Gold medal – first place	2012 Helsinki	3000 m st
Mediterranean Games
Disqualified	2013 Mersin	3000 m st

Gülcan Mıngır (pronounced [ˈɟyldʒan ˈmɯnɡɯɾ]; born 21 May 1989) is a Turkish female former middle distance runner specialized in 3000 m steeplechase. She was a member of Fenerbahçe Athletics Club before she transferred to Üsküdar Belediyespor. She is coached by İhsan Alptekin. Mıngır is 1.65 m (5 ft 5 in) tall and weighs 53 kg (117 lb).

Currently, Mıngır is a student of physical education and sports at Dumlupınar University in Kütahya.

She was the gold medalist of the 3000 m steeplechase event at the 2011 European Athletics U23 Championships held in Ostrava, Czech Republic.

Mıngır qualified to participate at the 2012 Summer Olympics.

At the 2013 Mediterranean Games held in Mersin, Turkey, she won the bronze medal in the 3000 m st event.

In April 2020, retests of the samples taken from the 2012 Olympics indicated that Mıngır had tested positive for turinabol. The IOC Disciplinary Commission disqualified Mıngır from the 2012 Olympic Games.

== Achievements ==
Year	Competition	Venue	Position	Event	Notes
Representing Turkey
2008	World Junior Championships	Bydgoszcz, Poland	12th	3000m steeplechase	10:29.77
2009	European U23 Championships	Kaunas, Lithuania	5th	3000m steeplechase	10:12.53
2011	European U23 Championships	Ostrava, Czech Republic	1st	3000 m steeplechase	9:47.83
2011	World Championships	Daegu, South Korea	26 (heats)	3000 m steeplechase	10:04.83
2012	European Championships	Helsinki, Finland	1st	3000 m steeplechase	9:32.96
2013	Mediterranean Games	Mersin, Turkey	~~3rd~~ /DQ	3000 m steeplechase	~~9:46.08~~
2013	Universiade	Kazan, Russia	DQ	3000 m steeplechase	~~9:45.88~~

== See also ==
- Turkish women in sports
