= Zorita, Cáceres =

Coordinates: 39°17′N 5°42′W

Zorita, Spain
- municipality
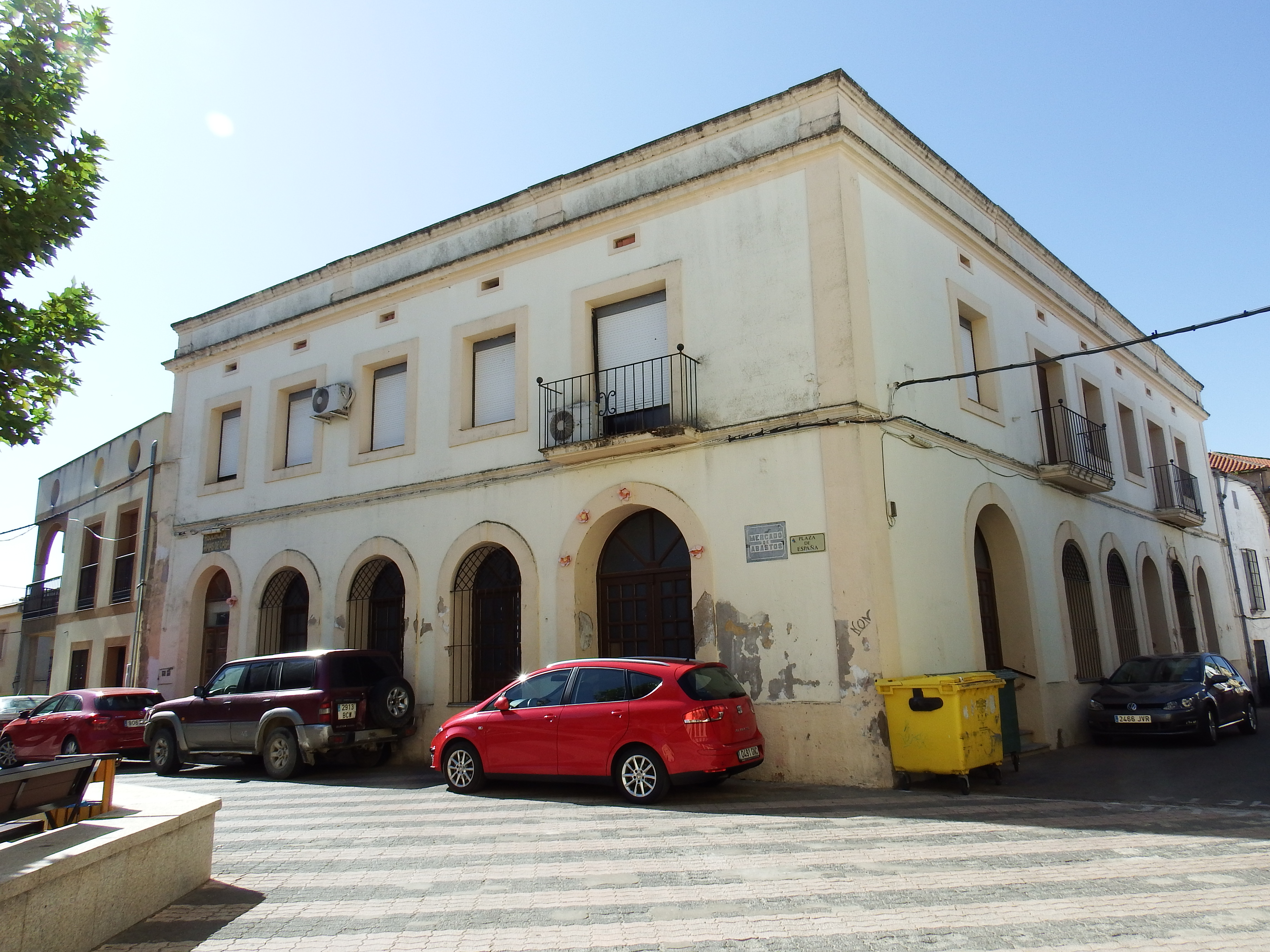
- Town of Zorita

- Flag Coat of arms

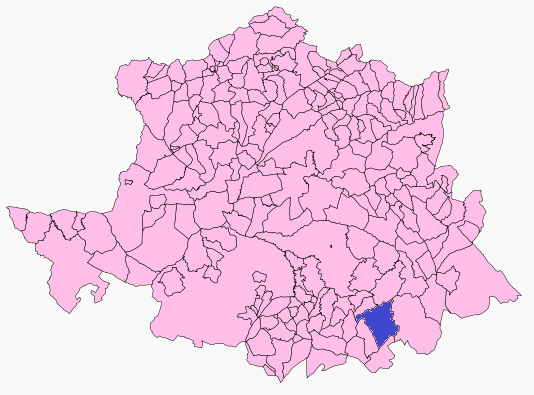
- Map of Zorita
- Country: Spain
- Autonomous community: Extremadura
- Province: Cáceres
- Municipality: Zorita

Area
  - Total: 186.96 km^{2} (72.19 sq mi)
- Elevation: 423 m (1,388 ft)

Population (2025-01-01)
  - Total: 1,223
  - Density: 6.542/km^{2} (16.94/sq mi)
- Time zone: UTC+1 (CET)
  - Summer (DST): UTC+2 (CEST)

Zorita is a municipality located in the province of Cáceres, Extremadura, Spain. According to the 2006 census (INE), the municipality had a population of 1768 inhabitants.
