= Katarzyna Kowalska =

Polish long-distance runner

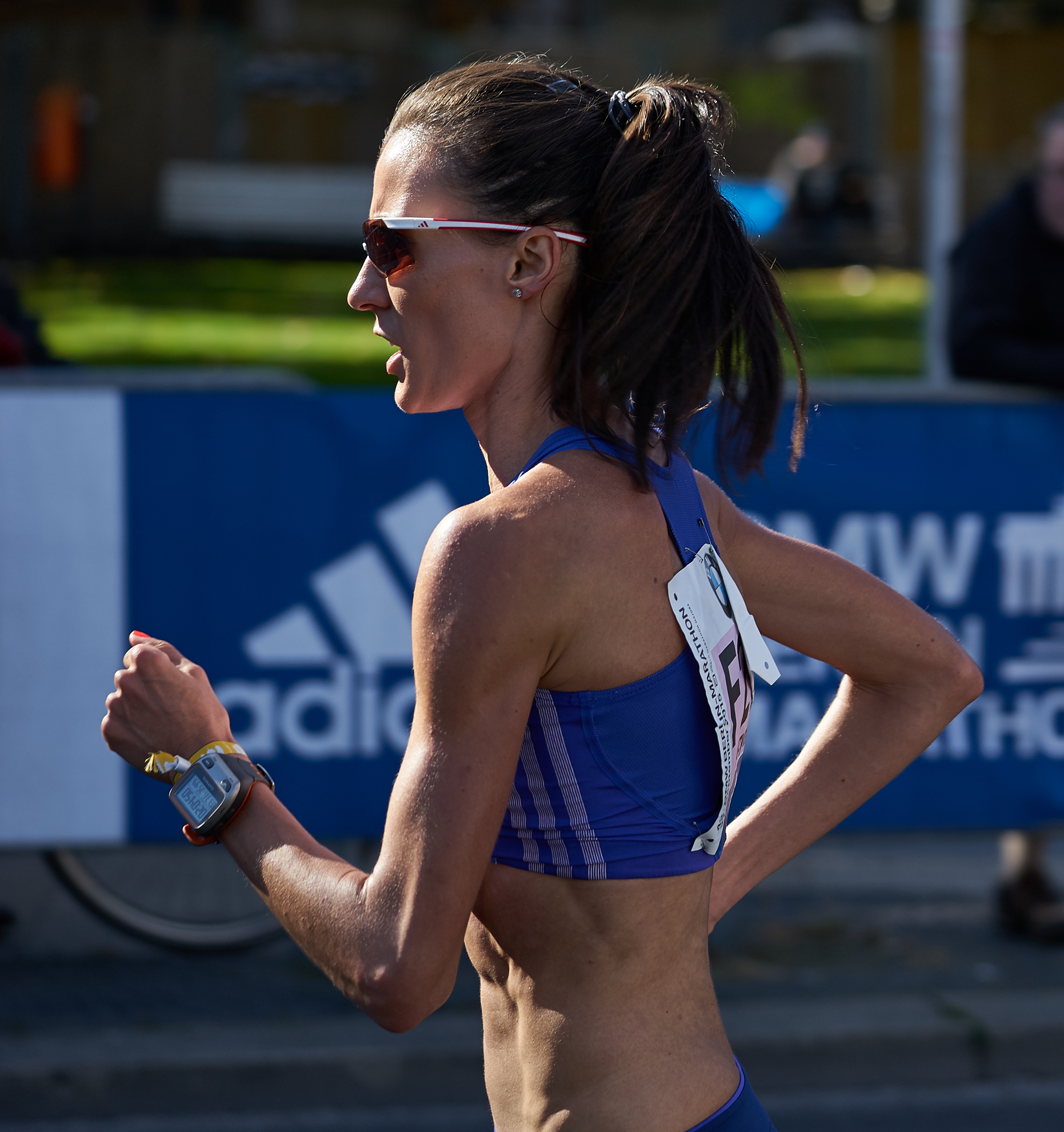
- Katarzyna Kowalska, Berlin Marathon 2015

Personal information
- Nationality: Poland
- Born: 7 April 1985 (age 41) Lipno, Poland
- Height: 1.78 m (5 ft 10 in)
- Weight: 55 kg (121 lb) (2012)

Sport
- Sport: Athletics
- Event: 3000 m steeplechase
- Club: LKS Vectra Włocławek
Medal record
European Team Championships
Bronze medal – third place	2014 Braunschweig	3000 m st.
European U23 Championships
Gold medal – first place	2005 Erfurt	3000 m steeplechase
Gold medal – first place	2007 Debrecen	3000 m steeplechase

Katarzyna Kowalska (born 7 April 1985 in Lipno) is a Polish long-distance runner who specialises in the 3000 metres steeplechase. She represented Poland at the 2008 Olympic Games and 2012 Olympic Games and reached the final of the 2009 World Championships in Athletics. She also competed at the 2006 European Athletics Championships and the 2007, 2009, and 2013 World Championships.

Kowalska was Poland's best finisher at the 2010 IAAF World Cross Country Championships. She has won numerous medals at the under-23 level, including two golds at the European Athletics U23 Championships and a bronze at the European Cross Country Championships.

== Career ==
Her first international competition was the 2004 IAAF World Junior Championships, where she finished fourth in her heats. Kowalska won the steeplechase gold at the 2005 European Athletics U23 Championships. In 2006, she won a bronze in the European Cup and at the 2006 European Athletics Championships, she recorded a personal best of 9:42.50 in the qualifiers before going on to finish ninth in the final. She represented Europe in the 5000 metres at the 2006 IAAF World Cup in Athens but finished in last place. She ran at the 2006 European Cross Country Championships in the under-23 race, and although she finished ninth, she headed Poland to the team silver medal.

She won the gold medal at the 2007 European Cup and retained her title at the 2007 European Athletics U23 Championships with a personal best run of 9:39.40. She made her first global appearance for Poland at the 2007 World Championships in Athletics later that year, getting eliminated in the heats stage. In December, she won the individual and team bronze medals in the under-23 competition at the 2007 European Cross Country Championships. She represented Poland at the 2008 Beijing Olympics but again failed to progress beyond the heats of the steeplechase. Having recorded a new personal best time of 9:26.93 in the heats, Kowalska reached her first global senior final at the 2009 World Championships in Athletics and finished in twelfth place. She was selected to run at the 2009 IAAF World Athletics Final and she finished eighth.

After winning the Polish Cross Country Championships in 2010, she attended the 2010 IAAF World Cross Country Championships in Bydgoszcz, Poland, and was the host's best performer with a 36th-place finish in the women's senior race.

== Personal bests ==
Event	Time (min)	Venue	Date
1500 m	4:12.66	Warsaw, Poland	15 June 2008
3000 m	9:12.40	Bydgoszcz, Poland	3 June 2011
3000 m steeplechase	9:26.93	Berlin, Germany	15 August 2009
5000 m	15:48.88	Bydgoszcz, Poland	11 August 2011
Half marathon	1:10:06	Prague, Czech Republic	2 April 2016
Marathon	2:29:41	Berlin, Germany	27 September 2015

- All information taken from IAAF profile.

== Achievements ==
Year	Competition	Venue	Position	Event	Notes
Representing Poland
2004	World Junior Championships	Grosseto, Italy	15th (heats)	3000 m st.	10:35.22
2005	European U23 Championships	Erfurt, Germany	1st	3000 m st.	9:54.17
2006	European Cup	Málaga, Spain	3rd	3000 m st.	9:56.10
2006	European Championships	Gothenburg, Sweden	9th	3000 m st.	9:42.89
2006	IAAF World Cup	Athens, Greece	8th	5000 m	16:18.35
2006	European Cross Country Championships	San Giorgio su Legnano, Italy	9th	U23 race (5.975 km)	19:24
2006	European Cross Country Championships	San Giorgio su Legnano, Italy	2nd	U23 race - Team	65 pts
2007	European Cup	Munich, Germany	1st	3000 m st	9:45.35
2007	European U23 Championships	Debrecen, Hungary	1st	3000 m st.	9:39.40
2007	World Championships	Osaka, Japan	29th (heats)	3000 m st.	9:58.74
2007	European Cross Country Championships	Toro, Spain	3rd	U23 race (6.7 km)	22:44
2007	European Cross Country Championships	Toro, Spain	3rd	U23 race - Team	58 pts
2008	Olympic Games	Beijing, China	33rd (heats)	3000 m st.	9:47.02
2009	World Championships	Berlin, Germany	12th	3000 m st.	9:30.37
2009	World Athletics Final	Thessaloniki, Greece	8th	3000 m st.	9:37.86
2009	European Team Championships	Leiria, Portugal	8th	3000 m st.	9:58.54
2010	World Cross Country Championships	Bydgoszcz, Poland	36th	Senior race (7.759 km)	26:45
2010	European Championships	Barcelona, Spain	10th	3000 m st.	9:42.47
2010	European Team Championships	Bergen, Norway	3rd	3000 m st.	9:43.40
2012	Olympic Games	London, Great Britain	30th (heats)	3000 m st.	9:48.60
2013	World Championships	Moscow, Russia	10h2	3000 m st.	9:44.12
2013	European Team Championships	Gateshead, Great Britain	11th	3000 m st.	10:11.26
2014	European Championships	Zurich, Switzerland	7th	3000 m st.	9:43.09
2014	European Team Championships	Braunschweig, Germany	3rd	3000 m st.	9:41.78
2015	European Team Championships	Cheboksary, Russia	6th	3000 m st.	10:03.44
2016	Olympic Games	Rio de Janeiro, Brazil	DNF	Marathon	DNF
2018	European Championships	Berlin, Germany	29th (h)	3000 m st.	9:54.83
