= Sara Moreira =

Portuguese long-distance runner

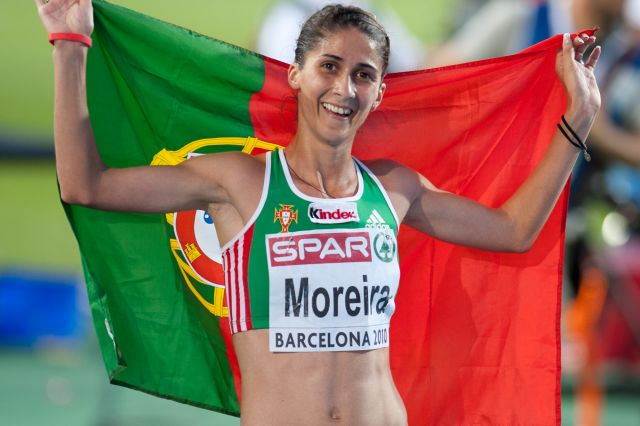

Medal record

Women's athletics

Representing Portugal

European Championships
Gold medal – first place	2016 Amsterdam	Half marathon
Silver medal – second place	2010 Barcelona	5000 m
Silver medal – second place	2012 Helsinki	5000 m

European Indoor Championships
Gold medal – first place	2013 Gothenburg	3000 m
Silver medal – second place	2009 Turin	3000 m

IAAF World Cross Country Championships
Bronze medal – third place	2009 Amman	Team

European Cross Country Championships
Gold medal – first place	2008 Brussels	Team
Gold medal – first place	2009 Dublin	Team
Gold medal – first place	2010 Albufeira	Team

Universiade
Silver medal – second place	2011 Shenzhen	5000 m

Sara Isabel Fonseca Moreira ComM (Portuguese pronunciation: [ˈsaɾɐ muˈɾɐjɾɐ]; born 17 October 1985) is a Portuguese runner who competes in cross country, road running and in middle-distance and long-distance track events. She represents Sporting CP at club level.

After contributing for three collective European cross-country titles and winning individual silver and bronze medals in other championships, she secured her first individual senior title with the 3000 metres gold medal at the 2013 European Athletics Indoor Championships in Gothenburg. At the 2016 European Athletics Championships, Moreira won her first major outdoor individual title by taking the gold medal in the debuting half marathon event.

== Career ==
Sara Isabel Fonseca Moreira was born in Santo Tirso, Portugal, Moreira's first international athletics competition was the 2007 European Athletics U23 Championships, where she took the bronze medal in the steeplechase. She attended the 2007 World Championships in Athletics the following year and finished in thirteenth place in the final. The following year she took part in two major competitions: the IAAF World Cross Country Championships where she finished 50th in the senior race, and then the 2008 Summer Olympics later that year, where she failed to get past the heats of the steeplechase competition.

The 2009 saw Moreira take on an extensive competitive schedule. In March 2009, she won the silver medal at the European Indoor Championships with a new personal best of 8:48.18 – her first senior medal. A sixteenth-place finish at the 2009 IAAF World Cross Country Championships saw her help the Portuguese women to a team bronze, along with Ana Dulce Félix. She scored a series of gold medals in July, starting with a 5000 metres and steeplechase double at the 2009 Summer Universiade (which included a Universiade record in the steeplechase), followed by another 5000 m gold at the 2009 Lusophony Games. At the 2009 World Championships in Athletics she missed out on the steeplechase final but managed to finish tenth in the women's 5000 m contest. Having competed extensively from March to August, Moreira's final competition of 2009 was the 2009 European Cross Country Championships in December, where she finished tenth and won the team gold with Portugal.

Moreira started her 2010 campaign at the 2010 IAAF World Indoor Championships in Doha and she finished sixth in the final of the 3000 metres, the second best European performer after Ethiopian-born Alemitu Bekele Degfa, who competed for Turkey. Later that month she ran at the 2010 IAAF World Cross Country Championships and finished in 27th place (the fifth best European performer). She took third place at the European Cup 10000m in June 2010, making her debut over 10,000 metres, and also helped win the women's team title for Portugal with Inês Monteiro and Fernanda Ribeiro. She recorded a 3000 m personal best shortly after at the Gran Premio de Andalucía, where her time of 8:42.69 brought her third place behind Nuria Fernández.

At the 2010 European Athletics Championships she secured a 5000 m bronze medal, setting a personal best of 14:54.71, but dropped out of the 10,000 m mid-race. She was selected to run the 3000 m for Europe at the 2010 IAAF Continental Cup, but she finished in seventh place. A ninth-place finish at the 2010 European Cross Country Championships helped Portugal to the team gold medal. She ended the year with a win at the São Silvestre da Amadora 10K race on New Year's Eve.

Her 2011 began with a third-place finish at the European Cross Country Club Championships, hosted at the Cinque Mulini, where her club, Maratona Clube de Portugal, came second in the women's team race. She came seventh over 1500 m at the 2011 European Athletics Indoor Championships and was twentieth in the senior race at the 2011 IAAF World Cross Country Championships later that year. After fellow Portuguese Augusto dropped out of the European Cup 10000m, she took on the favourite role and won the title, five seconds clear of Christelle Daunay. Moreira tested positive for the prohibited stimulant, methylhexaneamine at the 2011 World Championships in Athletics. Her result was annulled and she was banned for six months.

Upon her return, she won the Douro Valley Half Marathon in May, the European Cup 10000m title in June, then a bronze medal in the 5000 m at the 2012 European Athletics Championships. She gained selection for the Portuguese Olympic team and ran a personal best of 31:16.44 minutes to place fourteenth in the 10,000 m Olympic final. She defeated Berhane Adere to win the Great Birmingham Run in October and placed twelfth at the 2012 European Cross Country Championships.

== Achievements ==
Year	Competition	Venue	Position	Event	Notes
Representing Portugal
2007	European U23 Championships	Debrecen, Hungary	3rd	3000 m st.	9:42.47
2007	World Championships	Osaka, Japan	13th	3000 m st.	10:00.40
2008	World Cross Country Championships	Edinburgh, United Kingdom	50th	Senior race (7.905 km)	27:50
2008	World Cross Country Championships	Edinburgh, United Kingdom	8th	Senior race - Team	165 pts
2008	Olympic Games	Beijing, China	22nd (h)	3000 m st.	9:34.39
2009	European Indoor Championships	Turin, Italy	2nd	3000 m	8:48.18
2009	World Cross Country Championships	Amman, Jordan	16th	Senior race (8 km)	27:54
2009	World Cross Country Championships	Amman, Jordan	3rd	Senior race - Team	72 pts
2009	European Team Championships	Leiria, Portugal	7th	1500 m	4:12.94
2009	European Team Championships	Leiria, Portugal	4th	3000 m st.	9:43.99
2009	Universiade	Belgrade, Serbia	1st	5000 m	15:32.78
2009	Universiade	Belgrade, Serbia	1st	3000 m st	9:32.62
2009	Lusophony Games	Lisbon, Portugal	1st	5000 m	15.45.05
2009	World Championships in Athletics	Berlin, Germany	12th (h)	3000 m st.	9:28.64
2009	World Championships in Athletics	Berlin, Germany	10th	5000 m	15:12.22
2009	European Cross Country Championships	Dublin, Ireland	10th	Senior race (8.018 km)	28:32
2009	European Cross Country Championships	Dublin, Ireland	1st	Team race	25 pts
2010	World Indoor Championships	Doha, Qatar	6th	3000 m	8:55.34
2010	World Cross Country Championships	Bydgoszcz, Poland	27th	Senior race (7.759 km)	26:22
2010	European Championships	Barcelona, Spain	3rd	5000 m	14:54.71
2010	European Cross Country Championships	Albufeira, Portugal	9th	Senior race (8.170 km)	27:26
2010	European Cross Country Championships	Albufeira, Portugal	1st	Senior race - Team	19 pts
2011	European Indoor Championships	Paris, France	7th	1500 m	4:16.67
2011	Universiade	Shenzhen, China	2nd	5000 m	15:45.83
2011	World Championships	Daegu, South Korea	–	3000 m st.	DQ
2012	Olympic Games	London, United Kingdom	14th	10,000 m	31:16.44
2013	European Indoor Championships	Gothenburg, Sweden	1st	3000 m	8:58.50
2014	European Championships	Zürich, Switzerland	6th	5000 m	15:38.13
2014	New York City Marathon	New York City, USA	3rd	Marathon	2:25:59
2015	World Championships	Beijing, China	12th	10,000 m	32:06.14
2016	European Championships	Amsterdam, Netherlands	1st	Half marathon	1:10:19
2018	European Championships	Berlin, Germany	–	10,000 m	DNF
2021	Olympic Games	Sapporo, Japan	–	Marathon	DNF

== See also ==
- List of doping cases in sport

Awards
Preceded by Jéssica Augusto	Portuguese Sportswoman of the Year; 2013	Succeeded by Telma Monteiro
