= Sandra Eriksson =

Finnish middle-distance runner

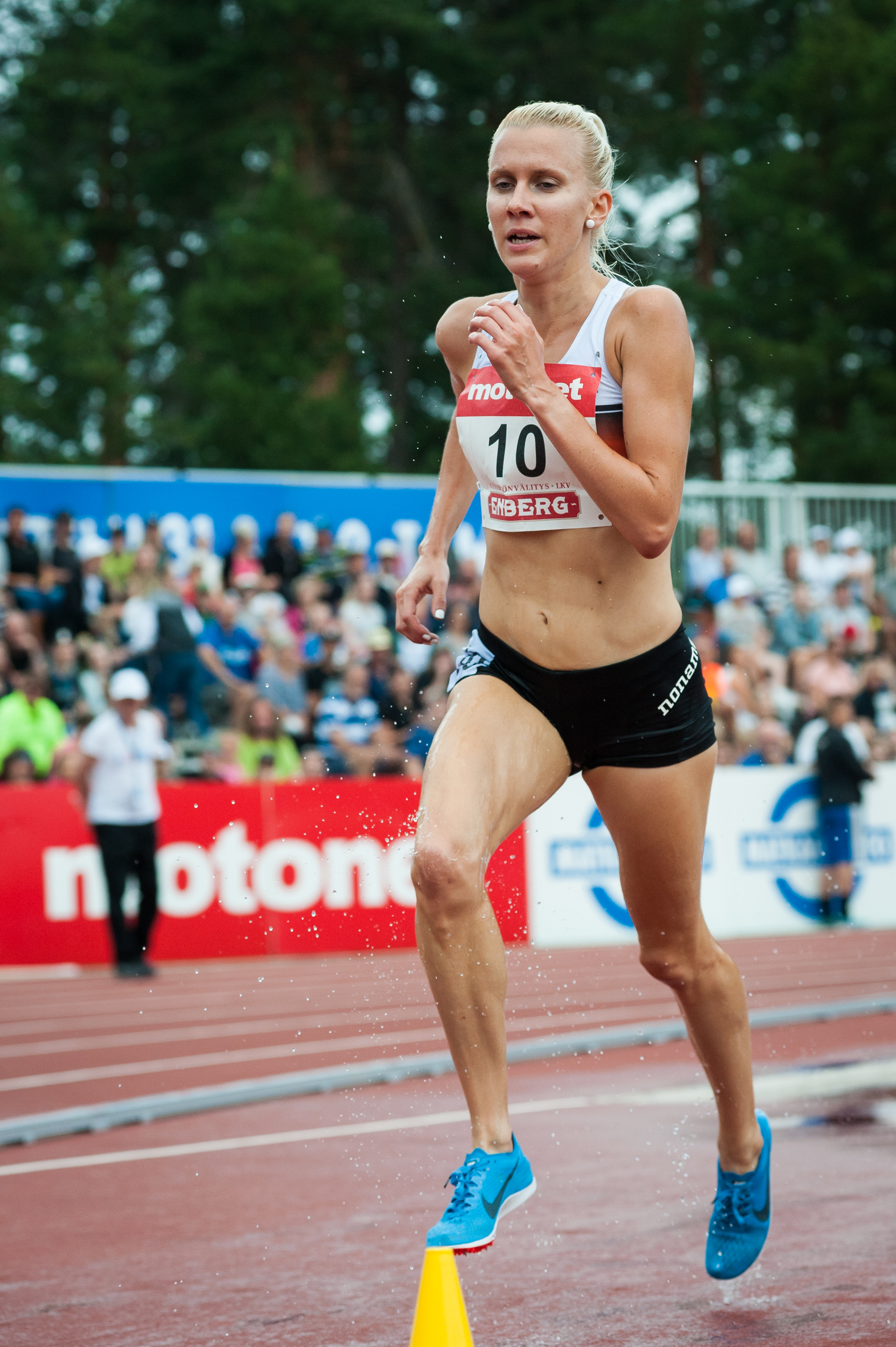
- Sandra Eriksson 2018

Personal information
- Born: June 4, 1989 (age 37) Nykarleby, Finland
- Height: 1.63 m (5 ft 4 in)
- Weight: 47 kg (104 lb)

Sport
- Country: Finland
- Sport: Track and field
- Event: 3000m steeplechase

Sandra Elisabet Eriksson (born 4 June 1989, in Nykarleby) is a Finnish middle distance runner, who specializes mainly in the 3000 metres steeplechase. Her personal best is 9:24.70, achieved in July 2014 in Glasgow. This is the current national record.

She competed in 2007 European Junior Championships (10th) and in 2008 World Junior Championships (5th). She competed at the World Championships in 2009 and 2011 without reaching the final.

She competed in the 2016 Summer Olympics.

== Achievements ==
Year	Competition	Venue	Position	Event	Notes
Representing Finland
2008	Finnish Championships	Tampere, Finland	1st	3000m steeplechase	10:15.25
2008	World Junior Championships	Bydgoszcz, Poland	5th	3000m steeplechase	10:00.87
2009	European U23 Championships	Kaunas, Lithuania	4th	3000m steeplechase	10:11.25
2009	Finnish Championships	Espoo, Finland	1st	3000m steeplechase	10:06.83
2015	European Indoor Championships	Prague, Czech Republic	5th	3000 m	8:54.06 NR
2015	World Championships	Beijing, China	23rd (h)	3000 m s'chase	9:39.64
2016	European Championships	Amsterdam, Netherlands	10th	3000 m s'chase	9:45.71
2016	Olympic Games	Rio de Janeiro, Brazil	47th (h)	3000 m s'chase	9:56.77
