= Andy Vernon =

British long-distance runner

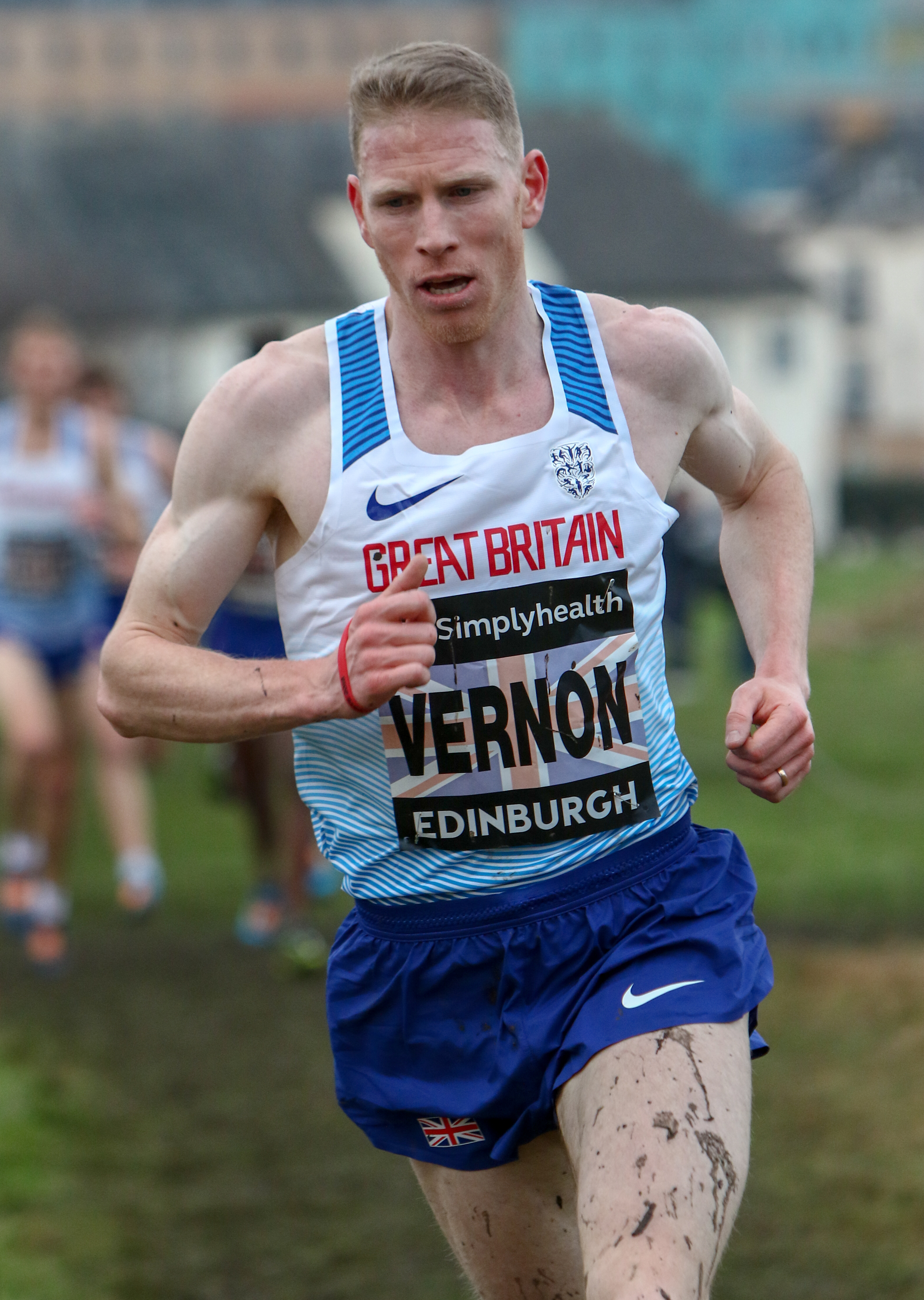
- Vernon in 2018

Personal information
- Nationality: British (English)
- Born: 7 January 1986 (age 40) Fareham, England
- Height: 1.80 m (5 ft 11 in)
- Weight: 74 kg (163 lb) (2017)

Sport
- Sport: Athletics
- Events: 5,000 metres 10,000 metres Cross country
- Club: Aldershot, Farnham & District AC

Achievements and titles
- Personal bests: 5,000 metres: 13:11.50; 10,000 metres: 27:42.62
Medal record
Men's athletics
Representing Great Britain
European Championships
| Silver medal – second place | 2014 Zürich | 10,000 metres |
| Bronze medal – third place | 2014 Zürich | 5000 metres |
European Cross Country Championships
| Gold medal – first place | 2016 Chia | Senior Team |
| Silver medal – second place | 2008 Brussels | Men's under-23 |
| Bronze medal – third place | 2007 Toro | Men's under-23 |
| Bronze medal – third place | 2013 Belgrade | Senior men |
Summer Universiade
| Gold medal – first place | 2011 Shenzhen | 5000 metres |
European Team Championships
| Bronze medal – third place | 2011 Stockholm | 5000 metres |
| Bronze medal – third place | 2015 Cheboksary | 5000 metres |

Andrew James Vernon (born 7 January 1986) is a British former 5000 metres, 10,000 metres and cross country athlete. After the 2018 Commonwealth Games, he focused on road racing, winning the Manchester Half Marathon with the aim of doing a full marathon in 2019. Vernon competed at the 2016 Summer Olympics in the men's 10,000 metres. He has also competed in two Commonwealth Games, a World Indoor Championship and six World Cross Country Championships. Vernon is a two-time European Athletics Championship medallist and a Summer Universiade gold medallist. He currently competes for Aldershot, Farnham & District AC.

== Competition ==
=== 2004–2009 ===
Vernon's debut at an international athletics competition was at the 2004 IAAF World Cross Country Championships where he competed in the 8,000-metre junior men's race; finishing 64th in a time of 27 minutes and 12 seconds. Vernon's next international competition was the 2005 IAAF World Cross Country Championships where he again competed in the junior men's race, this time finishing 48th. At the 2005 European Athletics Junior Championships he competed in the 5000 metres; finishing 4th in a time of 14 minutes and 27 seconds. In December 2005 he won his first international medal in the European Junior Cross Country Championships finishing 2nd behind Hungary's Barnabás Bene. He then competed at the 2007 European Cross Country Championships and finished 3rd in the men's under-23 race. At the 2007 European Athletics U23 Championships Vernon competed in the 5000 metres and finished seventh in a time of 13 minutes and 59.24 seconds. Vernon competed in the 2008 World University Cross Country Championships, finishing sixth. Also in 2008 was the 2008 IAAF World Cross Country Championships where Vernon finished 115th in the 12 kilometres senior men's race. His next major competition was the 2008 European Cross Country Championships where he competed in the men's under-23 race. He finished second behind Italian Andrea Lalli. Vernon competed in his fourth World Cross Country Championships in the 2009 edition. He competed in the senior men's race and finished 78th. At the 2009 European Cross Country Championships in Dublin Vernon competed in the men's senior race; finishing 12th.

=== 2010–2016 ===
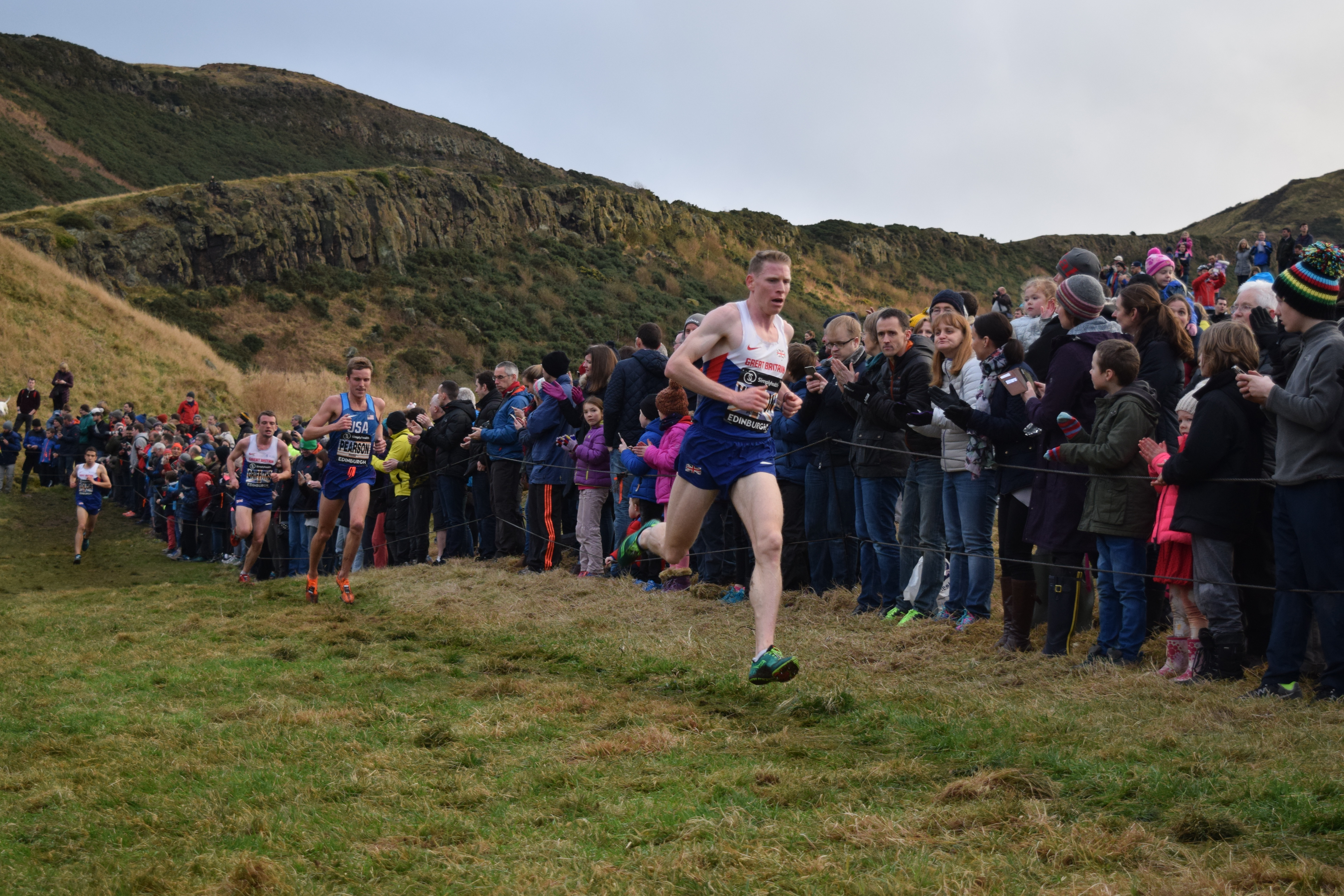
Vernon at the 2017 Great Edinburgh International Cross Country

In 2010, Vernon competed in the 2010 IAAF World Cross Country Championships and 2010 European Cross Country Championships finishing 44th in the World Championships and not finishing in the Europeans Championships. He then went on to qualify for and compete in the 2010 Commonwealth Games in Delhi, India. He competed in the 10,000 metres and finished tenth. In March 2011 Vernon competed in the senior men's race at the 2011 IAAF World Cross Country Championships and finished 58th. Vernon's next major competition was the 2011 European Cross Country Championships where he finished ninth in the senior men's race. Later in 2011, Vernon participated in the 5000 metres at the 2011 European Team Championships. Vernon finished third behind Spaniard Jesús España and Serhiy Lebid of Ukraine. Also in 2011 was the 2011 Summer Universiade where Vernon won a gold medal in the 5000 metres. In 2012 Vernon did not participate in the World Cross Country Championships. In the European Cross Country Championships he finished 13th in a time of 30 minutes and 33 seconds.

In 2013 Vernon again did not compete in the World Cross Country Champions and his only major competition for the year was the 2013 European Cross Country Championships where he finished third in the senior men's race behind Alemayehu Bezabeh of Spain and Turk Polat Kemboi Arıkan. In 2014 Vernon didn't compete in either of the major cross country championships. Instead he competed at the 2014 European Athletics Championships, the 2014 Commonwealth Games and the 2014 IAAF World Indoor Championships. At the European Athletics Championships Vernon won two medals. He won a silver medal in the men's 10,000 metres and a bronze medal in the men's 5000 metres. Vernon competed in the 5000 metres at the Commonwealth Games and finished sixth. Competing at his first World Indoor Championship, Vernon finished 11th in the 3000 metres. He ran his personal best of 27:42 in the 10,000 metres in May 2015, in Palo Alto, USA. The 2015 European Team Championships was Vernon's only major competition in 2015. He competed in the 5000 metres, finishing third behind Frenchman Morhad Amdouni and Jesús España. In 2016 Vernon competed at his first Summer Olympic Games. Vernon qualified for the 10,000 metres at the 2016 Summer Olympics. In the event he finished 25th out of 34 starters in a time of 28 minutes and 19.36 seconds. Upon winning the half marathon Great Birmingham Run in October 2016, Vernon said he hopes to add the marathon to his repertoire and qualify for the 2020 Summer Olympics.

=== 2017 ===
In March 2017, Vernon won the Reading Half Marathon with a time of 1:03:08.

== Controversy ==
In February 2015 Vernon was involved in an argument with fellow British athlete Mo Farah on Twitter. The argument started when Vernon criticised other athletes in a race Farah was due to compete in. Farah responded by criticising Vernon and the two continued to argue for over an hour.

Also, in August 2014, Vernon was involved in a Twitter argument with fellow British athlete Lynsey Sharp.
