= 2013 European Cross Country Championships =

- Organisers: EAA
- Edition: 20th
- Date: 8 December
- Host city: Belgrade, Serbia
- Events: 6
- Distances: 9.880 km – Men; 8.050 km – Women; 8.050 km – U23 men 6.025 km – U23 women 6.025 km – Junior men 4.000 km – Junior women

The 2013 European Cross Country Championships was the 20th edition of the cross country running competition for European athletes which was held in Belgrade, Serbia, on 8 December 2013. The senior individual winners were Alemayehu Bezabeh of Spain and Sophie Duarte of France. A record 571 runners from 37 nations entered the competition, making it Serbia's largest international athletics event in over forty years.

In the women's senior race Ireland's Fionnuala Britton was the defending champion, but she failed to win a third straight title and ended the race in fourth. Sophie Duarte took the lead in the penultimate lap and ran on her own over the last lap to take her first European gold medal at the age of 32. The 2011 minor medallists Ana Dulce Félix of Portugal and Great Britain's Gemma Steel closely raced each other in the final lap, with the British runner gaining the edge over the Portuguese on this occasion. Steel headed the British women to the team title, while Duarte led France to second and Spain took the bronze medals.

Andrea Lalli entered the men's senior race as champion and fellow 2012 medallists Hassan Chahdi and Daniele Meucci were also present. None of the three reached the podium on this occasion. The leading pack was soon whittled to two runners: 2009 champion Alemayehu Bezabeh and (despite an early fall) Polat Kemboi Arıkan of Turkey. Bezabeh extended his lead to over twenty seconds by the time he crossed the finish line. Arıkan was a clear second and British athlete Andy Vernon produced a fast finish to edge Belgium's Jeroen D'Hoedt to the bronze medal. Bezabeh headed up the Spanish team victory, followed by D'Hoedt's Belgium and Vernon's British side.

In the under-23 races Pieter-Jan Hannes of Belgium won the men's race and Great Britain topped the team rankings. Sifan Hassan of the Netherlands was dominant in the women's under-23 race, where the British under-23 team easily won the team gold with five women in the top eight. The junior men's race saw Turkey's Ali Kaya come out on top in a two-man race against Belgium's Isaac Kimeli. Women's junior champion Emelia Gorecka won a fourth straight junior team title for Great Britain and also her fourth straight podium finish (she previously won the title in 2011). She was unrivalled and won by a margin of ten seconds.

Three of the six event winners (Alemayehu Bezabeh, Sifan Hassan and Ali Kaya) were born in East Africa and gained European citizenship. Three of the individual silver medallists were also born outside of Europe: Arıkan in the men's senior race, Kimeli in the men's junior race, and Sofia Ennaoui in the women's junior race. This prompted concern of growing African participation in the European event – the falling interest in the IAAF World Cross Country Championships, partly due to a prolonged period of African dominance of the competition, had recently led to the world event being reduced to a biennial event. Excitement over Bezabeh's large margin of victory was also tempered by discussion of his doping ban stemming from Operación Galgo, which had expired at the beginning of the year.

== Race results ==
=== Senior men ===
Individual race
| Rank | Athlete | Country | Time (m:s) |
|---|---|---|---|
| Gold medal | Alemayehu Bezabeh | Spain | 29:11 |
| Silver medal | Polat Kemboi Arıkan | Turkey | 29:32 |
| Bronze medal | Andy Vernon | Great Britain | 29:35 |
| 4 | Jeroen D'Hoedt | Belgium | 29:35 |
| 5 | Hassan Chahdi | France | 29:40 |
| 6 | Mohamed Marhum | Spain | 29:46 |
| 7 | Richard Ringer | Germany | 29:49 |
| 8 | Bashir Abdi | Belgium | 29:53 |
| 9 | Koen Naert | Belgium | 29:54 |
| 10 | El Hassane Ben Lkhainouch | France | 29:56 |
| 11 | Iván Fernández | Spain | 29:58 |
| 12 | Tom Farrell | Great Britain | 29:59 |

Teams
| Rank | Team | Points |
|---|---|---|
| Gold medal | Spain; Bezabeh; Marhum; Fernández; Antonio Dávid Jímenez; Antonio Abadía; Javier Guerra | 31 |
| Silver medal | Belgium; D'Hoedt; Abdi; Naert; Soufiane Bouchikhi; Lander Tijtgat; Abdelhadi El Hachimi | 49 |
| Bronze medal | Great Britain; Vernon; Farrell; Keith Gerrard; Adam Hickey; Charlie Hulson; Frank Tickner | 60 |
| 4 | France | 66 |
| 5 | Germany | 69 |
| 6 | Ireland | 90 |
| 7 | Turkey | 105 |
| 8 | Italy | 151 |

=== Senior women ===
Individual race
| Rank | Athlete | Country | Time (m:s) |
|---|---|---|---|
| Gold medal | Sophie Duarte | France | 26:34 |
| Silver medal | Gemma Steel | Great Britain | 26:39 |
| Bronze medal | Dulce Félix | Portugal | 26:41 |
| 4 | Fionnuala Britton | Ireland | 26:45 |
| 5 | Karoline Bjerkeli Grøvdal | Norway | 26:52 |
| 6 | Almensh Belete | Belgium | 27:00 |
| 7 | Julia Bleasdale | Great Britain | 27:02 |
| 8 | Veronica Inglese | Italy | 27:12 |
| 9 | Carla Salomé Rocha | Portugal | 27:13 |
| 10 | Iris Maria Fuentes-Pila | Spain | 27:17 |
| 11 | Lauren Howarth | Great Britain | 27:18 |
| 12 | Clémence Calvin | France | 27:25 |

Teams
| Rank | Team | Points |
|---|---|---|
| Gold medal | Great Britain; Steel; Bleasdale; Howarth; Steph Twell; Katie Brough; Lauren Deadman | 35 |
| Silver medal | France; Duarte; Calvin; Christine Bardelle; Laila Traby; Laurane Picoche; Claire Perraux | 54 |
| Bronze medal | Spain; Fuentes-Pila; Diana Martín; Lidia Rodríguez; Marta Silvestre; Teresa Urbina; Alba García | 61 |
| 4 | Italy | 97 |
| 5 | Portugal | 109 |
| 6 | Ireland | 115 |
| 7 | Turkey | 117 |
| 8 | Czech Republic | 197 |

=== Under-23 men ===
Individual race
| Rank | Athlete | Country | Time (m:s) |
|---|---|---|---|
| Gold medal | Pieter-Jan Hannes | Belgium | 24:02 |
| Silver medal | Mitko Tsenov | Bulgaria | 24:07 |
| Bronze medal | Nemanja Cerovac | Serbia | 24:08 |
| 4 | Ivan Strebkov | Ukraine | 24:10 |
| 5 | Luke Caldwell | Great Britain | 24:13 |
| 6 | Ørjan Grønnevig | Norway | 24:15 |
| 7 | Callum Hawkins | Great Britain | 24:18 |
| 8 | Michele Fontana | Italy | 24:19 |
| 9 | Paul Robinson | Ireland | 24:22 |
| 10 | Henrik Ingebrigtsen | Norway | 24:23 |
| 11 | Dmytro Siruk | Ukraine | 24:23 |
| 12 | Jonathan Hay | Great Britain | 24:24 |

Teams
| Rank | Team | Points |
|---|---|---|
| Gold medal | Great Britain; Caldwell; Hawkins; Hay; Dewi Griffiths; Richard Goodman; Jack Goodwin | 40 |
| Silver medal | Ukraine; Strebkov; Siruk; Oleksandr Kuzmichov; Igor Porozov | 72 |
| Bronze medal | France; Romain Collenot-Spriet; Francois Barrer; Djilali Bedrani; Youssef Mekdafou; Michael Gras; Sofiane Boulekouane | 78 |

=== Under-23 women ===
Individual race
| Rank | Athlete | Country | Time (m:s) |
|---|---|---|---|
| Gold medal | Sifan Hassan | Netherlands | 19:40 |
| Silver medal | Amela Terzić | Serbia | 19:46 |
| Bronze medal | Charlotte Purdue | Great Britain | 19:49 |
| 4 | Kate Avery | Great Britain | 19:56 |
| 5 | Lily Partridge | Great Britain | 20:10 |
| 6 | Liv Westphal | France | 20:21 |
| 7 | Rhona Auckland | Great Britain | 20:25 |
| 8 | Laura Weightman | Great Britain | 20:28 |
| 9 | Corinna Harrer | Germany | 20:32 |
| 10 | Gulshat Fazlitdinova | Russia | 20:37 |
| 11 | Ekaterina Sokolenko | Russia | 20:45 |
| 12 | Svetlana Riazantceva | Russia | 20:47 |

Teams
| Rank | Team | Points |
|---|---|---|
| Gold medal | Great Britain; Purdue; Avery; Partridge; Auckland; Weightman; Jess Andrews | 19 |
| Silver medal | Russia; Fazlitdinova; Sokolenko; Riazantceva; Luiza Litvinova; Anna Fedorova | 54 |
| Bronze medal | Netherlands; Hassan; Maureen Koster; Irene Van Lieshout; Marlin Van Hal | 70 |

=== Junior men ===
Individual race
| Rank | Athlete | Country | Time (m:s) |
|---|---|---|---|
| Gold medal | Ali Kaya | Turkey | 17:49 |
| Silver medal | Isaac Kimeli | Belgium | 17:51 |
| Bronze medal | Mikhail Strelkov | Russia | 18:05 |
| 4 | Jonathan Davies | Great Britain | 18:06 |
| 5 | Lorenzo Dini | Italy | 18:06 |
| 6 | Alexandre Saddedine | France | 18:12 |
| 7 | Yemaneberhan Crippa | Italy | 18:14 |
| 8 | Steven Casteele | Belgium | 18:16 |
| 9 | Seán Tobin | Ireland | 18:18 |
| 10 | Viktor Bakharev | Russia | 18:20 |
| 11 | Aleksandr Novikov | Russia | 18:22 |
| 12 | Medhi Belhadj | France | 18:22 |

Teams
| Rank | Team | Points |
|---|---|---|
| Gold medal | France; Saddedine; Belhadj; Alexis Miellet; Maxime Hueber Moosbrugger; Theodore Klein; Hamza Habjaoui | 48 |
| Silver medal | Russia; Strelkov; Bakharev; Novikov; Vildan Gadelshin; Alexey Vikulov | 51 |
| Bronze medal | Italy; Lorenzo Dini; Yemaneberhan Crippa; Samuele Dini; Nekagenet Crippa; Osama Zoghlami; Italo Quazzola | 55 |

=== Junior women ===
Individual race
| Rank | Athlete | Country | Time (m:s) |
|---|---|---|---|
| Gold medal | Emelia Gorecka | Great Britain | 13:06 |
| Silver medal | Sofia Ennaoui | Poland | 13:16 |
| Bronze medal | Maruša Mišmaš | Slovenia | 13:27 |
| 4 | Georgia Taylor-Brown | Great Britain | 13:31 |
| 5 | Alina Reh | Germany | 13:34 |
| 6 | Aleksandra Guliaeva | Russia | 13:38 |
| 7 | Maria Larsson | Sweden | 13:39 |
| 8 | Bobby Clay | Great Britain | 13:40 |
| 9 | Emine Hatun Tuna | Turkey | 13:40 |
| 10 | Maya Rehberg | Germany | 13:41 |
| 11 | Jessica Gibbon | Great Britain | 13:41 |
| 12 | Ebba Andersson | Sweden | 13:44 |

Teams
| Rank | Team | Points |
|---|---|---|
| Gold medal | Great Britain; Gorecka; Taylor-Brown; Clay; Gibbon; Lydia Turner; Amy Griffiths | 24 |
| Silver medal | Sweden; Larsson; Andersson; Isabelle Brauer; Tova Euren-Magnussen; Agnes Sjostrom | 75 |
| Bronze medal | Germany; Reh; Rehberg; Caerina Granz; Vera Coutellier; Lea Meyer; Tatjana Schulte | 95 |

== Medal table ==
| Rank | Nation | Gold | Silver | Bronze | Total |
|---|---|---|---|---|---|
| 1 | Great Britain (GBR) | 5 | 1 | 3 | 9 |
| 2 | France (FRA) | 2 | 1 | 1 | 4 |
| 3 | Spain (ESP) | 2 | 0 | 1 | 3 |
| 4 | Belgium (BEL) | 1 | 2 | 0 | 3 |
| 5 | Turkey (TUR) | 1 | 1 | 0 | 2 |
| 6 | Netherlands (NED) | 1 | 0 | 1 | 2 |
| 7 | Russia (RUS) | 0 | 2 | 1 | 3 |
| 8 | Serbia (SRB) | 0 | 1 | 1 | 2 |
| 9 | Bulgaria (BUL) | 0 | 1 | 0 | 1 |
| 9 | Poland (POL) | 0 | 1 | 0 | 1 |
| 9 | Sweden (SWE) | 0 | 1 | 0 | 1 |
| 9 | Ukraine (UKR) | 0 | 1 | 0 | 1 |
| 13 | Germany (GER) | 0 | 0 | 1 | 1 |
| 13 | Italy (ITA) | 0 | 0 | 1 | 1 |
| 13 | Portugal (POR) | 0 | 0 | 1 | 1 |
| 13 | Slovenia (SLO) | 0 | 0 | 1 | 1 |
| Totals (16 entries) | | 12 | 12 | 12 | 36 |
