= 2008 European Cross Country Championships =

Coordinates: 50°53′35″N 4°20′49″E

- Organisers: EAA
- Edition: 15th
- Date: 14 December
- Host city: Brussels, Belgium
- Events: 6
- Distances: 10 km – Men; 8 km – Women; 8 km – U23 men 6 km – U23 women 6 km – Junior men 4 km – Junior women

The 15th European Cross Country Championships were held at Brussels in Belgium on 14 December 2008. Serhiy Lebid took his eighth title in the men's competition and Hilda Kibet won the women's race.

== Results ==
=== Men individual 10.0 km ===
| Pos. | Runners | Time |
|---|---|---|
| 1st place, gold medalist(s) | (Ukraine) Serhiy Lebid | 30:49 |
| 2nd place, silver medalist(s) | (United Kingdom) Mo Farah | 30:57 |
| 3rd place, bronze medalist(s) | (Sweden) Mustafa Mohamed | 31:13 |
| 4. | (Spain) Ayad Lamdassem | 31:17 |
| 5. | (Belgium) Pieter Desmet | 31:19 |
| 6. | (France) Bouabdellah Tahri | 31:21 |
| 7. | (Spain) Alemayehu Bezabeh | 31:23 |
| 8. | (Portugal) Rui Pedro Silva | 31:26 |
| 9. | (Netherlands) Michel Butter | 31:30 |
| 10. | (United Kingdom) Frank Tickner | 31:39 |
| 11. | (France) Mokhtar Benhari | 31:40 |
| 12. | (Italy) Daniele Meucci | 31:41 |

Total 77 competitors

=== Men teams ===
| Pos. | Runners | Points |
|---|---|---|
| 1st place, gold medalist(s) | Spain; Ayad Lamdassem; Alemayehu Bezabeh; Sergio Sánchez; Javier Guerra | 39 |
| 2nd place, silver medalist(s) | France; Bouabdellah Tahri; Mokhtar Benhari; Driss El Himer; James Theury | 49 |
| 3rd place, bronze medalist(s) | United Kingdom; Mo Farah; Frank Tickner; Michael Skinner; Lee Merrien | 54 |
| 4. | Italy | 79 |
| 5. | Belgium | 93 |
| 6. | Ukraine | 116 |
| 7. | Ireland | 129 |
| 8. | Portugal | 153 |

Total 12 teams

=== Women individual 8.0 km ===
| Pos. | Runners | Time |
|---|---|---|
| 1st place, gold medalist(s) | (Netherlands) Hilda Kibet | 27:45 |
| 2nd place, silver medalist(s) | (Portugal) Jessica Augusto | 27:54 |
| 3rd place, bronze medalist(s) | (Portugal) Inês Monteiro | 28:02 |
| 4. | (Republic of Ireland) Mary Cullen | 28:04 |
| 5. | (Spain) Rosa María Morató | 28:17 |
| 6. | (Netherlands) Adriënne Herzog | 28:19 |
| 7. | (Portugal) Anália Rosa | 28:25 |
| 8. | (United Kingdom) Hatti Dean | 28:30 |
| 9. | (United Kingdom) Louise Damen | 28:33 |
| 10. | (Italy) Elena Romagnolo | 28:39 |
| 11. | (Russia) Viktoriya Trushenko | 28:40 |
| 12. | (Russia) Gulnara Galkina | 28:40 |

Total 64 competitors

=== Women teams ===
| Pos. | Runners | Points |
|---|---|---|
| 1st place, gold medalist(s) | Portugal; Jessica Augusto; Inês Monteiro; Anália Rosa; Ana Dulce Félix | 29 |
| 2nd place, silver medalist(s) | United Kingdom; Hatti Dean; Louise Damen; Laura Kenney; Hayley Yelling | 49 |
| 3rd place, bronze medalist(s) | France; Sophie Duarte; Christelle Daunay; Christine Bardelle; Maria Martins | 78 |
| 4. | Netherlands | 97 |
| 5. | Russia | 111 |
| 6. | Italy | 119 |
| 7. | Spain | 127 |
| 8. | Belgium | 131 |

Total 11 teams

=== Men U23 individual 8.0 km ===
| Pos. | Runners | Time |
|---|---|---|
| 1st place, gold medalist(s) | (Italy) Andrea Lalli | 24:56 |
| 2nd place, silver medalist(s) | (United Kingdom) Andy Vernon | 25:04 |
| 3rd place, bronze medalist(s) | (Turkey) Selim Bayrak | 25:17 |
| 4. | (United Kingdom) Ben Lindsay | 25:18 |
| 5. | (France) Benjamin Malaty | 25:18 |
| 6. | (United Kingdom) John Beattie | 25:18 |
| 7. | (United Kingdom) Keith Gerrard | 25:21 |
| 8. | (France) Mourad Amdouni | 25:22 |

Total 85 competitors

=== Men U23 teams ===
| Pos. | Runners | Points |
|---|---|---|
| 1st place, gold medalist(s) | United Kingdom; Andy Vernon; Ben Lindsay; John Beattie; Keith Gerrard | 19 |
| 2nd place, silver medalist(s) | Italy; Andrea Lalli; Martin Dematteis; Bernard Dematteis; Simone Gariboldi | 42 |
| 3rd place, bronze medalist(s) | France; Benjamin Malaty; Mourad Amdouni; Denis Mayaud; Pierrot Pantel | 62 |
| 4. | Poland | 93 |
| 5. | Turkey | 112 |
| 6. | Spain | 119 |
| 7. | Belgium | 142 |
| 8. | Ireland | 151 |

Total 16 teams

=== Women U23 individual 6.0 km ===
| Pos. | Runners | Time |
|---|---|---|
| 1st place, gold medalist(s) | (Netherlands) Susan Kuijken | 21:02 |
| 2nd place, silver medalist(s) | (United Kingdom) Sarah Tunstall | 21:10 |
| 3rd place, bronze medalist(s) | (Russia) Yuliya Zarudneva | 21:24 |
| 4. | (United Kingdom) Morag MacLarty | 21:24 |
| 5. | (Romania) Ancuţa Bobocel | 21:43 |
| 6. | (Germany) Heike Bienstein | 21:43 |
| 7. | (United Kingdom) Katherine Sparke | 21:47 |
| 8. | (Russia) Tatyana Shutova | 21:49 |

Tota 66 competitors

=== Women U23 teams ===
| Pos. | Runners | Points |
|---|---|---|
| 1st place, gold medalist(s) | United Kingdom; Sarah Tunstall; Morag MacLarty; Katherine Sparke; Stacey Johnson | 24 |
| 2nd place, silver medalist(s) | Russia; Yuliya Zarudneva; Tatyana Shutova; Natalya Puchkova; Natalya Vlasova | 44 |
| 3rd place, bronze medalist(s) | Germany; Heike Bienstein; Ingalena Heuck; Julia Hiller; Katharina Becker | 57 |
| 4. | Ireland | 80 |
| 5. | Spain | 135 |
| 6. | France | 137 |
| 7. | Portugal | 138 |
| 8. | Italy | 152 |

Total 11 teams

=== Junior men individual 6.0 km ===
| Pos. | Runners | Time |
|---|---|---|
| 1st place, gold medalist(s) | (France) Florian Carvalho | 18:42 |
| 2nd place, silver medalist(s) | (Norway) Sondre Nordstad Moen | 18.47 |
| 3rd place, bronze medalist(s) | (France) Hassan Chahdi | 18:49 |
| 4. | (Germany) Alexander Hahn | 18:55 |
| 5. | (United Kingdom) David Forrester | 18:58 |
| 6. | (Turkey) Hasan Pak | 18:58 |
| 7. | (Portugal) Bruno Albuquerque | 19:08 |
| 8. | (Spain) Antonio Abadía | 19:11 |

Total 94 competitors

=== Junior men teams ===
| Pos. | Runners | Points |
|---|---|---|
| 1st place, gold medalist(s) | France; Florian Carvalho; Hassan Chahdi; Simon Denissel; Colin Guillard | 50 |
| 2nd place, silver medalist(s) | Norway; Sondre Nordstad Moen; Sindre Buraas; Lars Erik Malde; Henrik Ingebrigtsen | 51 |
| 3rd place, bronze medalist(s) | United Kingdom; David Forrester; Ross Murray; Mitch Goose; Phillip Berntsen | 52 |
| 4. | Turkey | 79 |
| 5. | Spain | 89 |
| 6. | Germany | 93 |
| 7. | Belgium | 102 |
| 8. | Ireland | 169 |

Total 16 teams

=== Junior women individual 4.0 km ===
| Pos. | Runners | Time |
|---|---|---|
| 1st place, gold medalist(s) | (United Kingdom) Stephanie Twell | 13:28 |
| 2nd place, silver medalist(s) | (United Kingdom) Charlotte Purdue | 13:39 |
| 3rd place, bronze medalist(s) | (United Kingdom) Lauren Howarth | 13:55 |
| 4. | (United Kingdom) Emily Pidgeon | 14:00 |
| 5. | (United Kingdom) Emma Pallant | 14:05 |
| 6. | (United Kingdom) Laura Park | 14:08 |
| 7. | (Russia) Yekaterina Gorbunova | 14:12 |
| 8. | (Russia) Marina Gordeyeva | 14:12 |

Total 81 competitors

=== Junior women teams ===
| Pos. | Runners | Points |
|---|---|---|
| 1st place, gold medalist(s) | United Kingdom; Stephanie Twell; Charlotte Purdue; Lauren Howarth; Emily Pidgeon | 10 |
| 2nd place, silver medalist(s) | Ukraine; Viktoriya Pohorelska; Myroslava Polishchuk; Olha Skrypak; Lyudmyla Kovalenko | 50 |
| 3rd place, bronze medalist(s) | Russia; Yekaterina Gorbunova; Marina Gordeyeva; Yelena Korobkina; Yelnara Latypova | 62 |
| 4. | Ireland | 77 |
| 5. | Germany | 89 |
| 6. | Poland | 150 |
| 7. | France | 173 |
| 8. | Turkey | 174 |

Total 11 teams
