= Nemanja Cerovac =

Serbian middle-distance runner

Personal information
- Nationality: Serbian
- Born: November 16, 1991 (age 34) Šabac, Yugoslavia
- Height: 183
- Weight: 70

Sport
- Sport: Track, cross country
- Event(s): 1500 meters, mile, 5000 meters

Achievements and titles
- World finals: 2010 World Junior Championships in Athletics
- Personal best(s): 1500m: 3:46.20; Mile: 4:08.02; 5000m: 13:55.09
Medal record
Men's athletics
Representing Serbia
European Cross Country Championships
Silver medal – second place	2010 Albufeira	Junior men's 6K
Bronze medal – third place	2013 Belgrade	U23 men's 8K
- Updated on April 28, 2015

Nemanja Cerovac (born November 16, 1991) is a Serbian middle-distance runner. He ran in the youth races at the European Cross Country Championships in 2010 and 2013. He has competed in various cross country distances, but specializes in the middle-distances, particularly in the 1500 meters.

== Running career ==
Cerovac took up athletics for the first time at the age of 15. He subsequently began training with AK Mladost Užice from Užice in Serbia, which is over 1,300 feet above sea level. He ran his first major international race at the 2010 European Cross Country Championships, where he ran in the junior race and placed second overall. In 2011, Cerovac enrolled in the Faculty of Physical Education in Sarajevo, Bosnia and Herzegovina. He continued training athletics simultaneously with studying under his coach Miloš Mitrić, a former Villanova distance runner. At the 2013 European Cross Country Championships, which were held in Belgrade, Cerovac ran in the U23 race and placed third, behind Mitko Tsenov. His third-place finish was widely regarded as a surprising result, even by the local media. Prior to the race, he had recovered for almost three years from a tendon rupture suffered after his 2010 cross country race in Portugal.

Cerovac made his American racing debut on April 25, 2015, when he made an appearance at the Penn Relays in the men's Olympic Development mile race. He finished in 10th place of 14 finishers, in a time of 4:08.02. On May 2, 2015, he ran the 5000 meters at the highly-competitive Payton Jordan Invitational meet at Stanford University, recording 13:55.09. In the results list, Cerovac was listed as attached to the Melbourne Track Club, as were some other international runners at the same meet such as Andy Vernon.
