= Amdouni =

Amdouni is a surname. Notable people with the surname include:

- Ghali (rapper) (Ghali Amdouni, born 1993), Italian rapper and record producer
- Morhad Amdouni (born 1988), French middle and long-distance runner
- Zeki Amdouni (born 2000), Swiss footballer
