= 2007 European Cross Country Championships =

Coordinates: 41°30′20″N 5°30′21″W

- Organisers: EAA
- Edition: 14th
- Date: 9 December
- Host city: Toro, Spain
- Events: 6
- Distances: 10.7 km – Men; 8.2 km – Women; 8.2 km – U23 men 6.7 km – U23 women 6.7 km – Junior men 4.2 km – Junior women

The 14th European Cross Country Championships were held at Toro in Spain on 9 December 2007. Serhiy Lebid took his seventh title in the men's competition and Marta Domínguez won the women's race.

== Results ==
=== Men individual 10.7 km ===
Pos.	Runners	Time
1st place, gold medalist(s)	(Ukraine) Serhiy Lebid	31:47
2nd place, silver medalist(s)	(Sweden) Mustafa Mohamed	31:56
3rd place, bronze medalist(s)	(Portugal) Rui Silva	31:58
4.	(Sweden) Erik Sjöqvist	32:00
5.	(Spain) José Manuel Martínez	32:04
6.	(Spain) Jesús España	32:05
7.	(Republic of Ireland) Martin Fagan	32:06
8.	(France) El Hassan Lahssini	32:08
9.	(Portugal) Ricardo Ribas	32:10
10.	(Spain) José Ríos	32:12
11.	(United Kingdom) Andrew Baddeley	32:14
12.	(Spain) Alberto García	32:16

Total 57 competitors

=== Men teams ===
Pos.	Runners	Points
1st place, gold medalist(s)	Spain; José Manuel Martínez; Jesús España; José Ríos; Alberto García	33
2nd place, silver medalist(s)	Portugal; Rui Silva; Ricardo Ribas; José Rocha; Leão Carvalho	64
3rd place, bronze medalist(s)	France; El Hassan Lahssini; Mokhtar Benhari; Simon Munyutu; Irba Lakhal	75
4.	United Kingdom	81
5.	Sweden	83
6.	Belgium	92
7.	Ireland	105
8.	Italy	139

Total 9 teams

=== Women individual 8.2 km ===
Pos.	Runners	Time
1st place, gold medalist(s)	(Spain) Marta Domínguez	26:58
2nd place, silver medalist(s)	(France) Julie Coulaud	27:01
3rd place, bronze medalist(s)	(Spain) Rosa Morató	27:04
4.	(Russia) Mariya Konovalova	27:07
5.	(Hungary) Anikó Kálovics	27:10
6.	(United Kingdom) Kate Reed	27:10
7.	(Republic of Ireland) Fionnuala Britton	27:20
8.	(France) Saadia Bourgailh-Haddioui	27:25
9.	(United Kingdom) Hayley Yelling	27:28
10.	(United Kingdom) Liz Yelling	27:31
11.	(Portugal) Jessica Augusto	27:32
12.	(Spain) Iris Fuentes-Pila	27:38

Total 46 competitors

=== Women teams ===
Pos.	Runners	Points
1st place, gold medalist(s)	Spain; Marta Domínguez; Rosa Morató; Iris Fuentes-Pila; Alessandra Aguilar	33
2nd place, silver medalist(s)	United Kingdom; Kate Reed; Hayley Yelling; Liz Yelling; Helen Clitheroe	47
3rd place, bronze medalist(s)	Portugal; Jéssica Augusto; Mónica Rosa; Fernanda Ribeiro; Ana Dias	69
4.	France	77
5.	Ireland	112
6.	Italy	140

Total 6 teams

=== Men U23 individual 8.2 km ===
Pos.	Runners	Time
1st place, gold medalist(s)	(Turkey) Kemal Koyuncu	24:31
2nd place, silver medalist(s)	(Russia) Yevgeniy Rybakov	24:33
3rd place, bronze medalist(s)	(United Kingdom) Andy Vernon	24:35
4.	(Italy) Andrea Lalli	24:43
5.	(Italy) Stefano La Rosa	24:44
6.	(Belarus) Stsiapan Rahautsou	24:45
7.	(Poland) Artur Kozłowski	24:45
8.	(Poland) Łukasz Parszczyński	24:26

Total 77 competitors

=== Men U23 teams ===
Pos.	Runners	Points
1st place, gold medalist(s)	United Kingdom; Andrew Vernon; Andrew Baker; Ryan McLeod; Thomas Lancashire	52
2nd place, silver medalist(s)	Poland; Artur Kozłowski; Łukasz Parszczyński; Arkadiusz Gardzielewski; Radosław Kłeczek	52
3rd place, bronze medalist(s)	Russia; Yevgeniy Rybakov; Anatoliy Rybakov; Konstantin Vasilyev; Stepan Kiselev	65
4.	Turkey	101
5.	France	105
6.	Ireland	108
7.	Italy	115
8.	Portugal	131

Total 12 teams

=== Women U23 individual 6.7 km ===
Pos.	Runners	Time
1st place, gold medalist(s)	(Romania) Ancuţa Bobocel	22:35
2nd place, silver medalist(s)	(Netherlands) Adrienne Herzog	22:37
3rd place, bronze medalist(s)	(Poland) Katarzyna Kowalska	22:44
4.	(Russia) Tatyana Shutova	22:52
5.	(United Kingdom) Felicity Milton	23:02
6.	(Republic of Ireland) Linda Byrne	23:04
7.	(Spain) Marta Romo	23:05
8.	(United Kingdom) Katrina Wootton	23:08

Total 67 competitors

=== Women U23 teams ===
Pos.	Runners	Points
1st place, gold medalist(s)	United Kingdom; Felicity Milton; Katrina Wootton; Katherine Sparke; Susannah Hignett	47
2nd place, silver medalist(s)	Russia; Tatyana Shutova; Alina Alekseyeva; Natalya Starkova; Irina Sergeyeva	55
3rd place, bronze medalist(s)	Poland; Katarzyna Kowalska; Dominika Główczewska; Marta Wojtkuńska; Agnieszka Ciołek	58
4.	Belgium	82
5.	Spain	108
6.	Ireland	129
7.	Italy	139
8.	Portugal	152

Total 11 teams

=== Junior men individual 6.7 km ===
Pos.	Runners	Time
1st place, gold medalist(s)	(France) Mourad Amdouni	20:08
2nd place, silver medalist(s)	(France) Florian Carvalho	20:11
3rd place, bronze medalist(s)	(Ukraine) Dmytro Lashyn	20:16
4.	(United Kingdom) David Forrester	20:21
5.	(United Kingdom) Lee Carey	20:22
6.	(Norway) Sondre Nordstad Moen	20:23
7.	(Spain) Mohamed Elbendir	20:24
8.	(France) Hassan Chahdi	20:25

Total 89 teams

=== Junior men teams ===
Pos.	Runners	Points
1st place, gold medalist(s)	France; Mourad Amdouni; Florian Carvalho; Hassan Chahdi; Younes el Haddad	29
2nd place, silver medalist(s)	United Kingdom; David Forrester; Lee Carey; Ben Lindsay; Mitch Goose	48
3rd place, bronze medalist(s)	Germany; Alexander Hahn; Florian Orth; Rico Schwarz; Thorsten Baumeister	57
4.	Turkey	87
5.	Spain	124
6.	Italy	130
7.	Ireland	136
8.	Ukraine	144

Total 14 teams

=== Junior women individual 4.2 km ===
Pos.	Runners	Time
1st place, gold medalist(s)	(United Kingdom) Stephanie Twell	14:12
2nd place, silver medalist(s)	(Poland) Danuta Urbanik	14:21
3rd place, bronze medalist(s)	(United Kingdom) Charlotte Purdue	14:22
4.	(United Kingdom) Charlotte Roach	14:27
5.	(Russia) Olha Skrypak	14:28
6.	(United Kingdom) Emily Pidgeon	14:31
7.	(Portugal) Joana Costa	14:32
8.	(United Kingdom) Joanne Harvey	14:32

Total 87 competitors

=== Junior women teams ===
Pos.	Runners	Points
1st place, gold medalist(s)	United Kingdom; Stephanie Twell; Charlotte Purdue; Charlotte Roach; Emily Pidgeon	14
2nd place, silver medalist(s)	Russia; Marina Gordeyeva; Alfiya Khasanova; Natalya Novichkova; Yekaterina Gorbunova	50
3rd place, bronze medalist(s)	Ukraine; Olha Skrypak; Viktoriya Pohorelska; Lyudmyla Kovalenko; Anna Mihel	57
4.	Poland	67
5.	Ireland	124
6.	Portugal	142
7.	France	151
8.	Spain	162

Total 13 teams
