= Bashir Abdi =

Somali-Belgian athlete

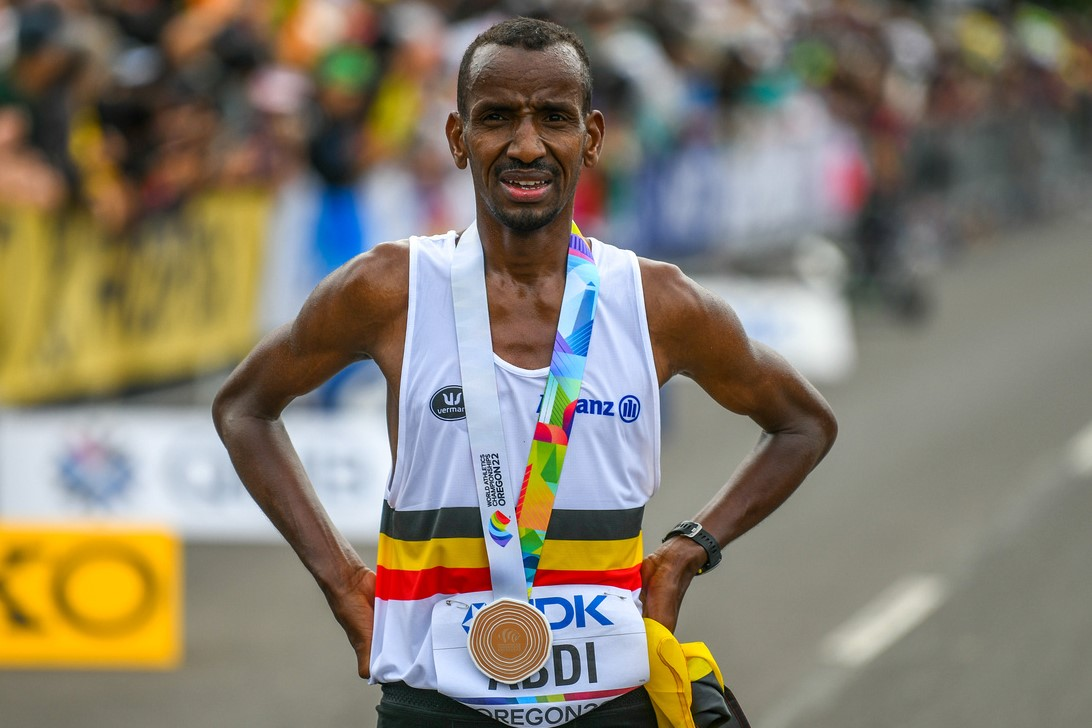
- Abdi at the 2022 World Athletics Championships in Eugene

Personal information
- Citizenship: Belgian
- Born: 10 February 1989 (age 37) El Afweyne, Somalia
- Height: 1.68 m (5 ft 6 in)

Sport
- Country: Belgium
- Sport: Athletics
- Event: Long-distance running
- Club: NN Running Team
- Coached by: Gary Lough

Achievements and titles
- Personal bests: Half marathon: 59:28 NR (Ghent 2026); Marathon: 2:03:36 AR (Rotterdam 2021)
Medal record
Men's athletics
Representing Belgium
Olympic Games
Silver medal – second place	2024 Paris	Marathon
Bronze medal – third place	2020 Tokyo	Marathon
World Championships
Bronze medal – third place	2022 Eugene	Marathon
European Championships
Silver medal – second place	2018 Berlin	10,000 m
World Marathon Majors
Silver medal – second place	2020 Tokyo	Marathon
Bronze medal – third place	2022 London	Marathon
Bronze medal – third place	2023 Chicago	Marathon

Bashir Abdi (born 10 February 1989) is a Belgian long-distance runner. He won bronze medals in the marathon at the 2020 Tokyo Olympics and 2022 World Championships and silver at the 2024 Summer Olympics. In doing so, Abdi became both the first ever Belgian world championship medal winner at the marathon and the first Belgian male athlete to win an individual medal at both the Olympic Games and World Athletics Championships. He claimed silver in the 10,000 metres at the 2018 European Championships. He finished second and third at the 2020 Tokyo Marathon and 2022 London Marathon respectively. Abdi is the European record holder for the marathon.

He also holds the Belgian records in the half marathon and one hour run, and the world best in the rarely contested 20,000 metres on track, as well as the Belgian national record for the marathon in the master M35 category.

== Personal life ==
Abdi was born in El Afweyn, Somaliland, a town mainly inhabited by the Habr Je'lo clan of the Isaaq clan-family. When he was eight, his family moved to Djibouti. He then spent a year and a half in Ethiopia, before settling in Belgium, where his mother had initiated a family reunification procedure after having received recognition as a political refugee. There, aged 16, he started training at the Racing Club Gent Athletics, following his brother Ibrahim. His mother always supported him being an athlete when no one else in his family would and when she died of cancer in 2011, on her last day, she impressed upon her children that as "this country has meant so much to all of you, be good people".

Abdi is married and has a daughter, Kadra, born 2018, and a son Ibrahim; born 2020. He is a co-founder and vice-chairman of the non-profit organization Sportaround, which organizes after-school sports activities for children in Ghent. He also co-founded the Bashir Abdi Fund with Ghent University Hospital, which funds initiatives to support healthcare providers physically and mentally.

== Running career ==
=== 2014–2017 ===
Abdi entered the 10,000 metres at the 2014 European Athletics Championships with the European-leading time set on 4 May. He finished fifth at the event.

In May 2015, he qualified for the 2016 Rio Olympics.

At the Games, Abdi competed in both the men's 5000 m and 10,000 m. He finished 20th in the 10,000 m final, the race won by Great Britain's Mo Farah.

In 2017, he competed in the London 2017 World Championships in Athletics in the men's 5000 m, placing sixth in his heat.

=== 2018–2019: Beginning of marathon career ===
In 2018, Abdi made his marathon debut at the Rotterdam Marathon, placing seventh with a time of 2:10:46. The race was won by Kenya's Kenneth Kipkemoi in 2:05:44. In August that year, he won silver in the 10,000 m at the 2018 European Athletics Championships. In the autumn Abdi raced several road races placing third at the Great North Run half marathon in a time of 1:00:42, fourth at the Dam tot Damloop 10 miler in 46:08, fifth at the Nijmegen Zevenheuvelenloop 15 km in 43:40 and third at the 's-Heerenberg Montferland Run 15 km in 43:40.

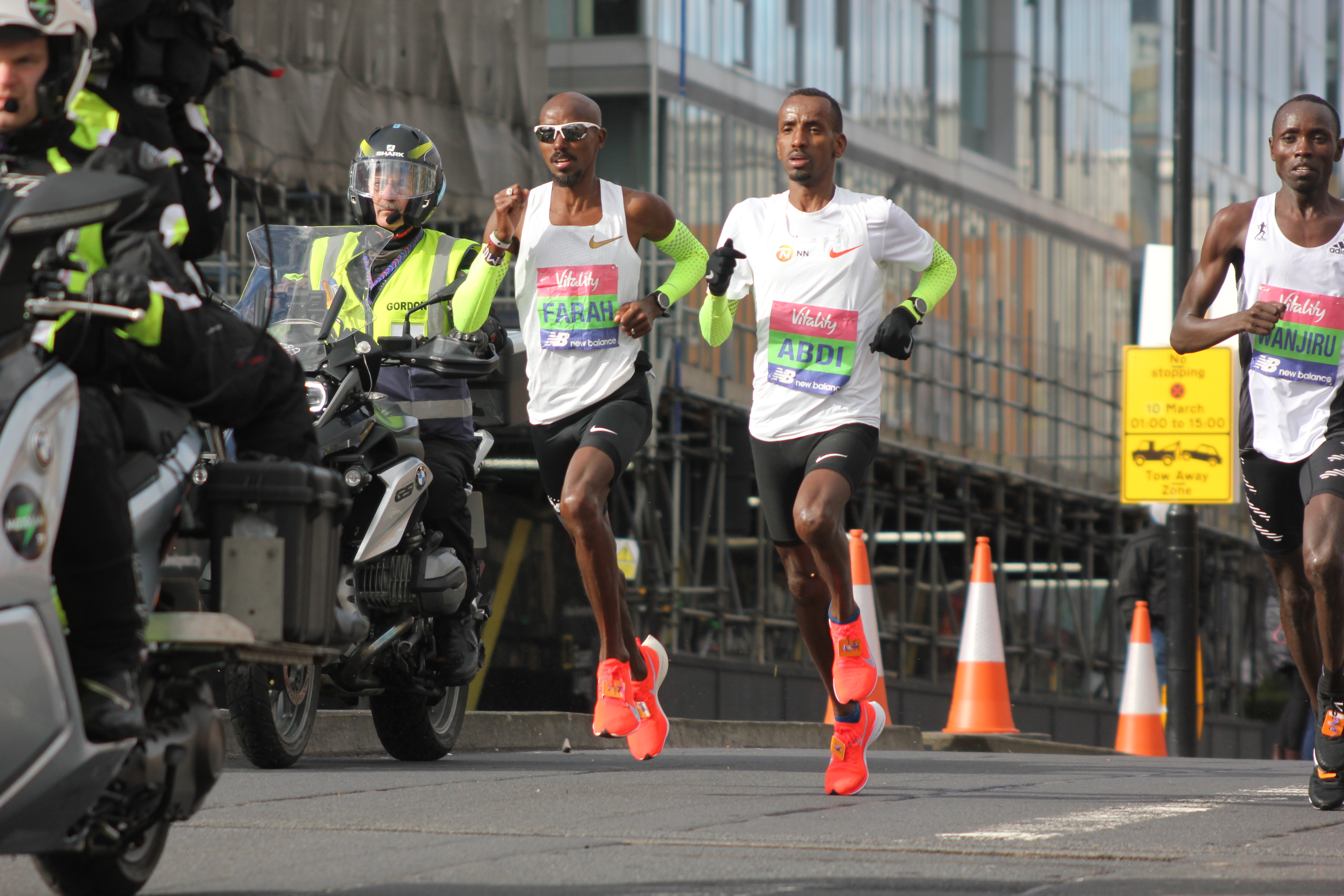
Mo Farah, Abdi and Daniel Wanjiru, The Big Half in London in 2019.

In 2019, he was second at the Big Half Marathon in London with a time of 1:01:16 in a close finish with race winner Mo Farah and third placer Daniel Wanjiru. Abdi then competed in the London Marathon, placing seventh in a time of 2:07:03 in a race won by Kenya's Eliud Kipchoge in 2:02:37. In August, he was second in the Beach to Beacon 10 km in the United States, finishing in 28:35. The race was initially won by Kenya's Alex Korio, however he was disqualified. Jairus Birech came in second. Abdi headed back to Newcastle upon Tyne where he again raced the Great North Run half marathon, finishing fifth in a time of 1:01:11, the race was won by Farah. In October, Abdi ran in the Chicago Marathon, placing fifth with a time of 2:06:14, the race was won by Kenya's Lawrence Cherono in 2:05:45 in a sprint finish. Abdi next raced at the Montferland Run 15 km, finishing fifth in a time of 42:29. On New Year's Eve in Spain he won the San Silvestre Vallecana 10k m in Madrid with a time of 27:47.

=== 2020–present: Marathon breakthrough ===
Abdi opened his 2020 racing campaign by winning the Egmond Half Marathon. He then achieved his first marathon podium position by placing second in the Tokyo Marathon in a new personal best time of 2:04:49. He passed Ethiopia's Sisay Lemma in the closing stages to finish behind the race winner Ethiopia's Birhanu Legese, who ran a time of 2:04:15. Abdi returned to the track in September competing at the Memorial Van Damme in the one hour race. He ran the majority of the race with Farah, taking the lead and setting a European record at 20,000 m of 56:20.02. He finished second behind Farah setting a mark of 21,322 metres.

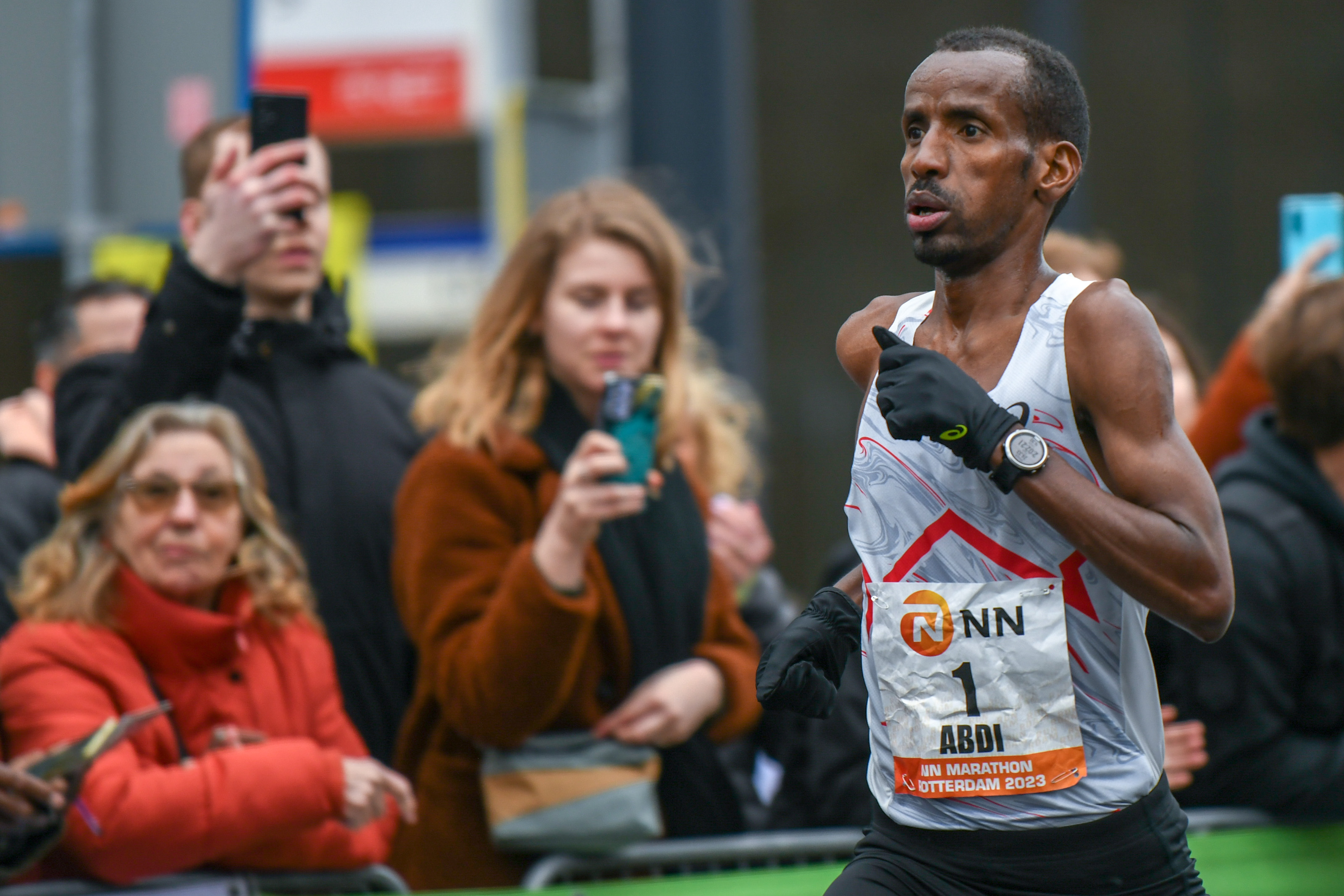
Bashir Abdi set a European record at the 2021 Rotterdam Marathon. In 2023 (pictured), he regained his title.

In 2021, Abdi was second behind Farah at the Djibouti International Half Marathon with a time of 1:03:11. He then placed second at the European 10,000 m Cup in Birmingham in a new personal best of 27:24.41. This performance qualified him for the 10,000 m event at the delayed 2020 Tokyo Olympics. He focused on the marathon at the Games, however, winning the bronze medal and the first medal for Belgium in the Olympic marathon event since Karel Lismont’s medal 45 years ago. The finish of the marathon provided one of the most enduring images of the 2020 Summer Olympics as Abdi's good friend, Dutch athlete and silver medal winner Abdi Nageeye, also of Somali descent, cheered and encouraged his exhausted Belgian training partner to stay with him as they battled for the medals with Kenya's Lawrence Cherono. In October, Abdi won the rescheduled Rotterdam Marathon, setting a European record with a time of 2:03:36.

In April 2022, he placed fourth at the Rotterdam Marathon. In July that year, Abdi won his second consecutive global bronze in the marathon at the 2022 World Athletics Championships held in Eugene, Oregon, clocking 2:06:48. He earned his second medal at a World Marathon Major by finishing third at the London Marathon in October with a time of 2:05:19.

In April 2023, Abdi regained his Rotterdam Marathon title in a time of 2:03:47, clocking a significant negative second half split of 61:32, setting the second fastest European time in history as he missed his own continental record by just 11 seconds.

At the beginning of 2024 Abdi, while on altitude training in Ethiopia, suffered a sacral stress fracture and was forced to interrupt training for 6 weeks, preventing him to run a spring marathon in preparation for the 2024 Summer Olympics in Paris, France. He returned to competition in the Great Manchester Run, his first race since his injury, and set a Belgian record in the 10 km on the road. At the 2024 Summer Olympics, he finished 2nd, winning Belgium's only silver medal at the Games. With his time of 2:06:47 he also broke the Belgian national record for the marathon in the master M35 category.

In 2025, Abdi competed in the Chicago Marathon, finishing 10th with a time of 2:07:08.

== Statistics ==
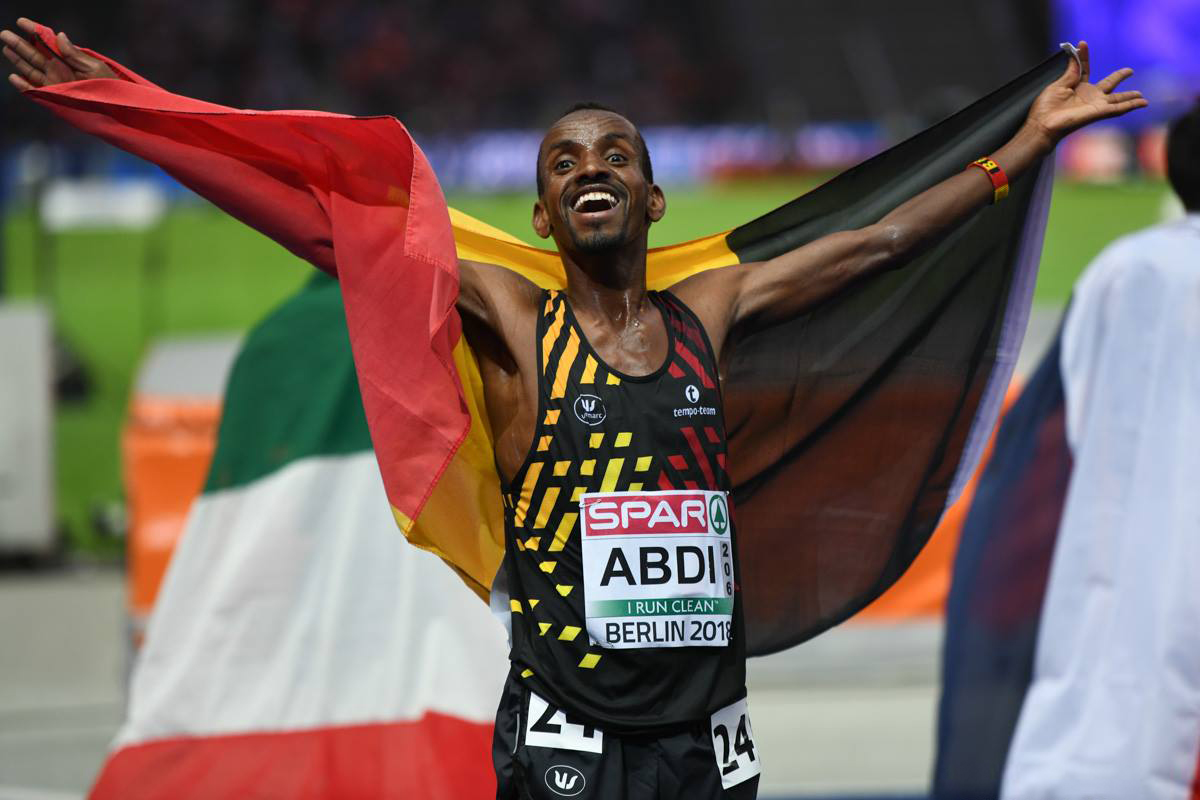
Abdi took silver for the 10,000 m at the 2018 European Athletics Championships in Berlin.

=== Competition record ===
Year	Competition	Venue	Position	Event	Time
Representing Belgium
2010	European Cross Country Championships	Albufeira, Portugal	41st	U23 race	25:25
2011	European U23 Championships	Ostrava, Czech Republic	15th	5000 m	14:30.52
2012	European Championships	Helsinki, Finland	8th	5000 m	13:39.01
2012	European Championships	Helsinki, Finland	4th	10,000 m	28:23.72
2012	European Cross Country Championships	Szentendre, Hungary	9th	Senior race	30:26
2013	European Team Championships First League	Dublin, Ireland	1st	5000 m	14:52.78
2013	World Championships	Moscow, Russia	23rd	10,000 m	28:41.69
2013	European Cross Country Championships	Belgrade, Serbia	8th	Senior race	29:53
2014	European Championships	Zürich, Switzerland	5th	10,000 m	28:13.61
2014	European Championships	Zürich, Switzerland	16th	5000 m	14:24.73
2015	European Team Championships First League	Heraklion, Greece	1st	5000 m	15:17.47
2015	World Championships	Beijing, China	– (f)	10,000 m	DNF
2015	World Championships	Beijing, China	– (h)	5000 m	DNS
2016	Olympic Games	Rio de Janeiro, Brazil	20th	10,000 m	28:01.49
2016	Olympic Games	Rio de Janeiro, Brazil	33rd (h)	5000 m	13:42.83
2017	World Championships	London, United Kingdom	19th (h)	5000 m	13:30.71
2018	European Championships	Berlin, Germany	2nd	10,000 m	28:11.76
2021	European 10,000m Cup	Birmingham, United Kingdom	2nd	10,000 m	27:24.41
2021	Olympic Games	Tokyo, Japan	3rd	Marathon	2:10:00 SB
2022	World Championships	Eugene, United States	3rd	Marathon	2:06:48
2024	Olympic Games	Paris, France	2nd	Marathon	2:06:47 SB
World Marathon Majors
2019	London Marathon	London, United Kingdom	7th	Marathon	2:07:03
2020	Tokyo Marathon	Tokyo, Japan	2nd	Marathon	2:04:49
2022	London Marathon	London, United Kingdom	3rd	Marathon	2:05:19

=== Personal bests ===
Surface	Event	Time (Distance)	Place	Date	Notes
Track	1500 metres	3:36.55	Oordegem, Belgium	5 July 2014	
Track	3000 metres	7:40.44	London, United Kingdom	24 July 2015	
Track	5000 metres	13:04.91	Brussels, Belgium	31 August 2018	
Track	10,000 metres	27:24.41	Birmingham, United Kingdom	5 June 2021	
Track	20,000 metres	56:20.02	Brussels, Belgium	4 September 2020	World best
Track	One hour run	21,322 m	Brussels, Belgium	4 September 2020	NR
Road	10 km	28:07	Schoorl, Netherlands	10 February 2019	
Road	Half marathon	59:51	Ghent, Belgium	12 March 2023	NR
Road	Marathon	2:03:36	Rotterdam, Netherlands	24 October 2021	European record

== Honours ==
- Ghent University awarded Abdi an institutional honorary doctorate for his unique combination of elite sports and social commitment.
