= 2014 European Athletics Championships – Men's 10,000 metres =

Men's 10,000 metres at the European Athletics Championships

The men's 10,000 metres at the 2014 European Athletics Championships was held at the Letzigrund on 13 August.

== Medalists ==
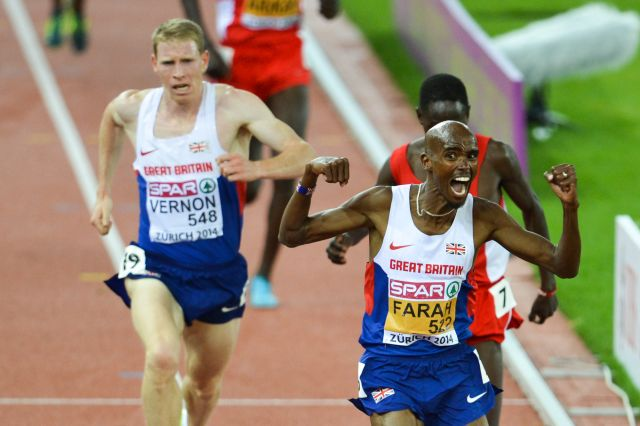
Finish of the event

Gold	Mo Farah; Great Britain
Silver	Andy Vernon; Great Britain
Bronze	Ali Kaya; Turkey

== Records ==
Standing records prior to the 2014 European Athletics Championships
World record	Kenenisa Bekele (ETH)	26:17.53	Brussels, Belgium	26 August 2005
European record	Mo Farah (GBR)	26:46.57	Eugene, United States	3 June 2011
Championship record	Martti Vainio (FIN)	27:30.99	Prague, Czechoslovakia	29 August 1978
World Leading	Galen Rupp (USA)	26:44.36	Eugene, United States	30 May 2014
European Leading	Bashir Abdi (BEL)	27:36.40	Palo Alto, United States	4 May 2014

== Schedule ==
Date	Time	Round
13 August 2014	19:50	Final

All times are local times (UTC+2)

== Results ==
Rank	Name	Nationality	Time	Note
1st place, gold medalist(s)	Mo Farah	Great Britain	28:08.11	
2nd place, silver medalist(s)	Andy Vernon	Great Britain	28:08.66	SB
3rd place, bronze medalist(s)	Ali Kaya	Turkey	28:08.72	PB
4	Polat Kemboi Arıkan	Turkey	28:11.11	SB
5	Bashir Abdi	Belgium	28:13.61	
6	Daniele Meucci	Italy	28:19.79	
7	Bouabdellah Tahri	France	28:26.03	
8	Stefano La Rosa	Italy	28:49.99	
9	Sondre Nordstad Moen	Norway	28:50.53	
10	Yevgeny Rybakov	Russia	28:53.48	
11	Koen Naert	Belgium	29:04.87	
12	Ricardo Ribas	Portugal	29:09.47	
13	Mats Lunders	Belgium	29:12.86	
14	Marius Øyre Vedvik	Norway	29:42.10	
15	Abdi Hakin Ulad	Denmark	29:50.67	
16	Mikael Ekvall	Sweden	30:04.93	
17	Himro Alame	Israel	30:04.95	
18	Girmaw Amare	Israel	30:53.87	
	Mehmet Akkoyun	Turkey	DNF	
	Adil Bouafif	Sweden	DNF	
	Serhiy Lebid	Ukraine	DNF	
	Yassine Mandour	France	DNF	
	Manuel Ángel Penas	Spain	DNF	
	Tom Wiggers	Netherlands	DNF	
