= Stefano La Rosa =

Italian long-distance runner (born 1985)

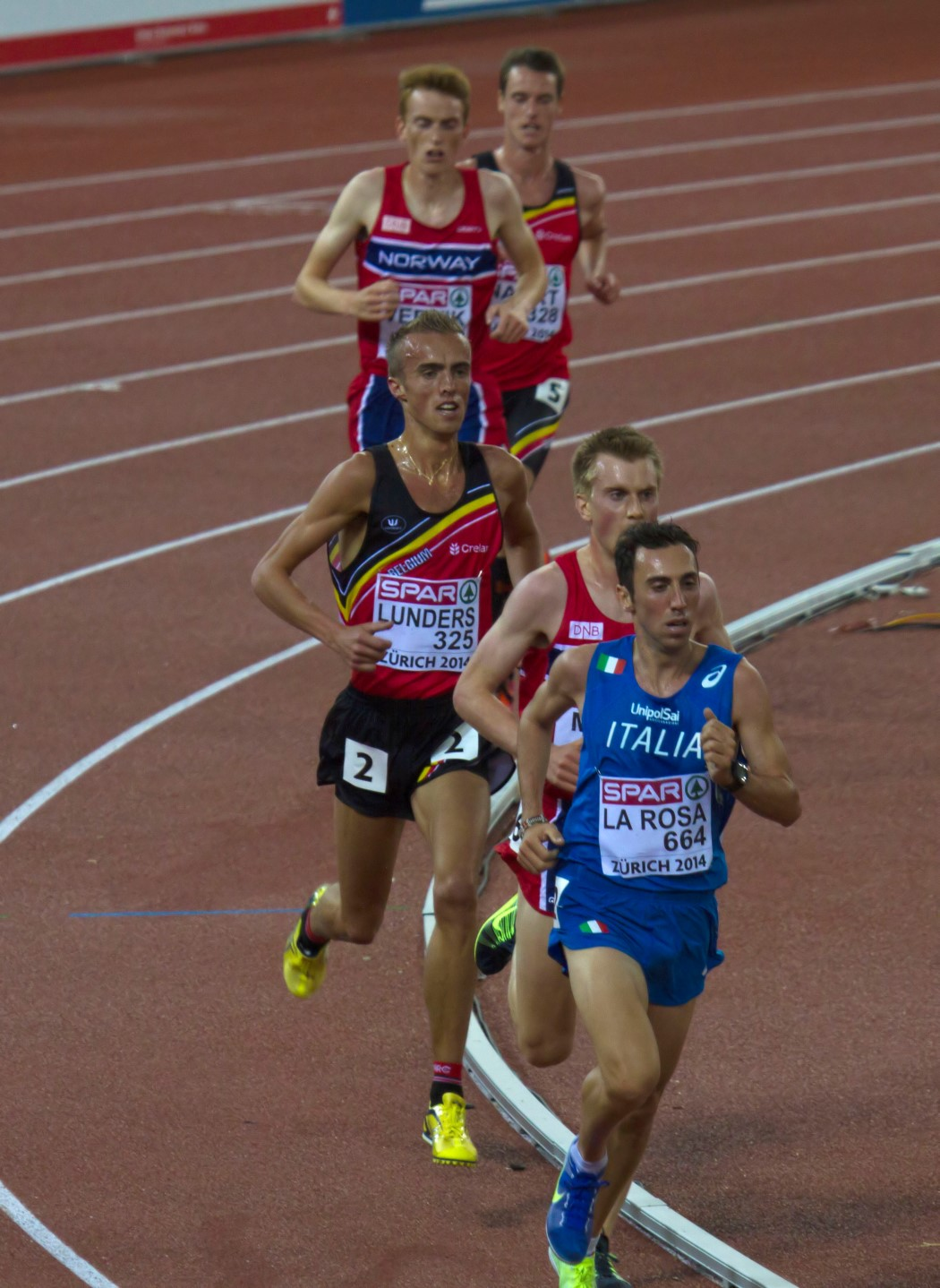
- Stefano La Rosa (first) at Zürich 2014

Personal information
- Nationality: Italian
- Born: 28 September 1985 (age 40) Grosseto, Italy
- Height: 1.66 m (5 ft 5 1/2 in)
- Weight: 55 kg (121 lb)

Sport
- Country: Italy
- Sport: Athletics
- Event(s): Long-distance running Marathon
- Club: C.S. Carabinieri

Achievements and titles
- Personal bests: 5000 m: 13:26.86 (2010); 10,000 m: 28:13.62 (2012)
Medal record
Event	1st	2nd	3rd
Summer Universiade	0	0	1
Mediterranean Games	0	1	0
European Championships
Bronze medal – third place	2016 Amsterdam	Half marathon team
European Cross Country Championships
Bronze medal – third place	2009 Dublin	Team
Bronze medal – third place	2014 Samokov	Team
European 10,000m Cup
Silver medal – second place	2017 Minsk	Team

Stefano La Rosa (born 28 September 1985 in Grosseto) is an Italian long-distance runner. He is a five-time Italian champion (twice over 10,000 metres and three times over 5000 metres).

== Biography ==
Of Sicilian descent, as a junior athlete, he came 52nd at the 2003 IAAF World Cross Country Championships. He came 16th over 5000 metres at the 2004 World Junior Championships in Athletics, but managed a 1500 metres/5000 m double at the Italian junior championships. He won a team silver medal in the under-23 section of the 2006 European Cross Country Championships, courtesy of his tenth-place finish. He improved to fifth place in this category at the 2007 European race. Senior success came two years later in the form of a 5000 m silver medal at the 2009 Mediterranean Games in Pescara and a team bronze medal at the 2009 European Cross Country Championships alongside Daniele Meucci.

In his first major senior track final, he came tenth over 5000 m at the 2010 European Athletics Championships. He managed the same position in the 3000 m at the 2011 European Athletics Indoor Championships and secured the bronze medal over 5000 m at the 2011 Summer Universiade in Shenzhen. He was the first Italian finisher at the 2011 BOClassic 10K race, taking sixth place overall.

== Achievements ==
Year	Competition	Venue	Position	Event	Notes
Representing Italy
2004	World Junior Championships	Grosseto, Italy	16th	5000 m	14:20.51
2007	European U23 Championships	Debrecen, Hungary	6th	1500m	3:46.37
2007	European U23 Championships	Debrecen, Hungary	10th	5000m	13:59.35
2009	Mediterranean Games	Pescara, Italy	2nd	5000 m	14:04.44
2010	European Championships	Barcelona, Spain	10th	5000 m	13:46.58
2011	European Indoor Championships	Paris, France	10th	3000 m	8:04.12
2011	Universiade	Shenzhen, China	3rd	5000 m	14:02.95
2012	European Championships	Helsinki, Finland	11th	5000 m	13:41.99
2013	Mediterranean Games	Mersin, Turkey	–	5000 m	DNF
2013	Universiade	Kazan, Russia	4th	5000 m	13:40.42
2014	European Championships	Zürich, Switzerland	8th	10,000 m	28:49.99
2016	European Championships	Amsterdam, Netherlands	13th	Half marathon	1:04:15

== National titles ==
He has won 9 times the individual national championship.

- 5 wins in the 5000 metres (2009, 2010, 2011, 2012, 2013)
- 3 wins in the 10,000 metres (2008, 2009, 2018)
- 1 win in the Half marathon (2012)
