= 2014 European Athletics Championships – Men's 5000 metres =

Men's 5000 metres at the European Athletics Championships

The men's 5000 metres at the 2014 European Athletics Championships took place at the Letzigrund on 17 August.

== Medalists ==
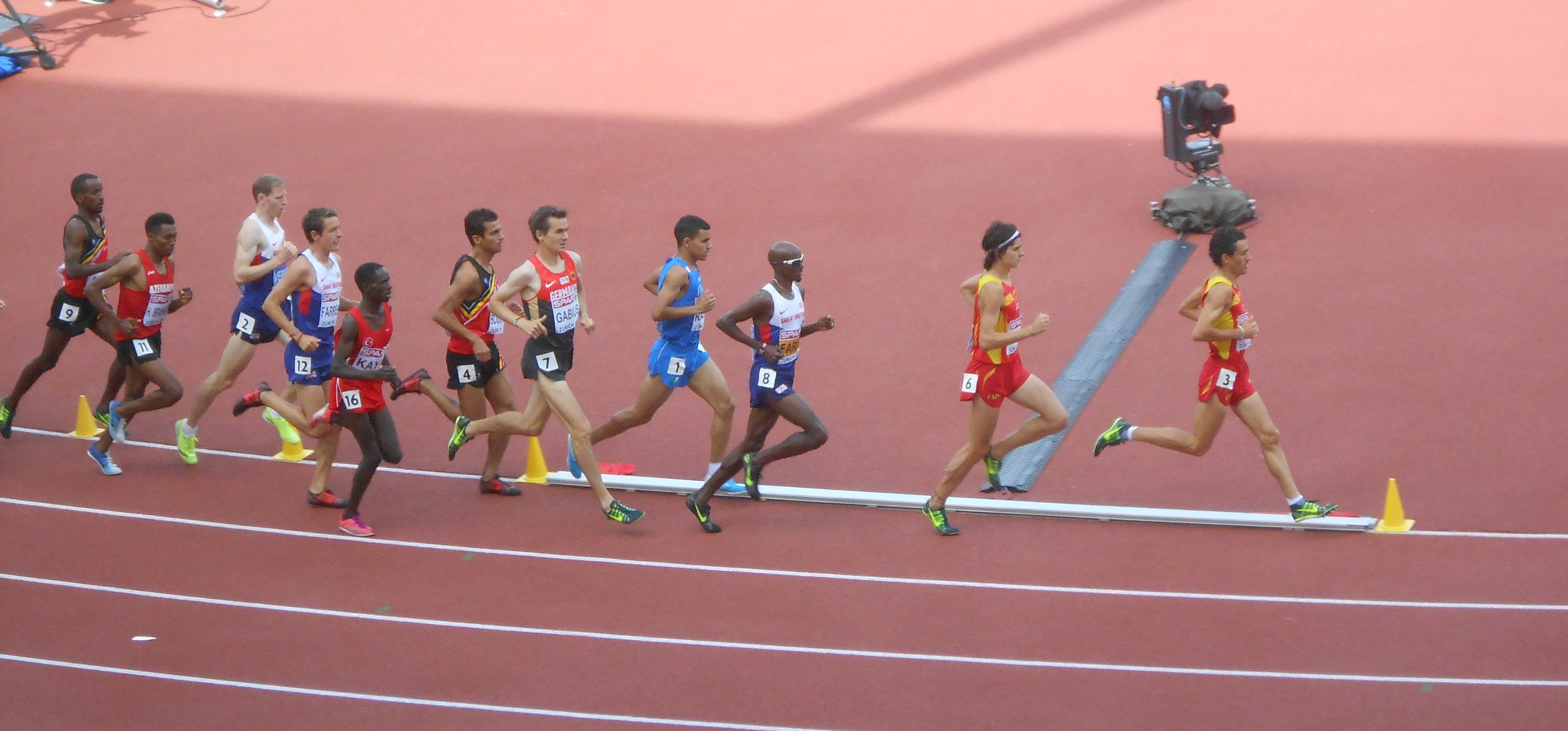
The race underway

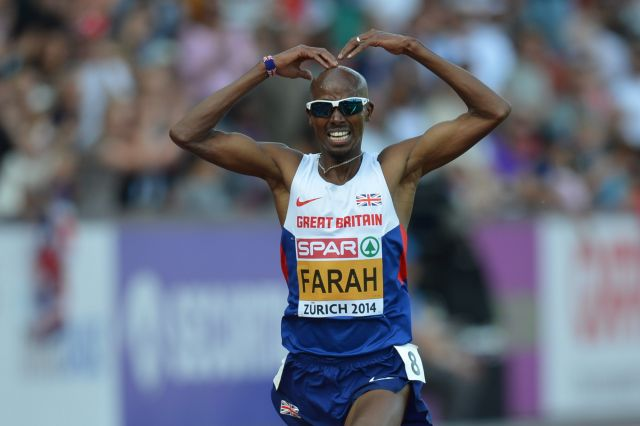
Winner Mo Farah

Gold	Mo Farah; Great Britain
Silver	Hayle Ibrahimov; Azerbaijan
Bronze	Andy Vernon; Great Britain

== Records ==
Standing records prior to the 2014 European Athletics Championships
World record	Kenenisa Bekele (ETH)	12:37.35	Hengelo, Netherlands	31 May 2004
European record	Mohammed Mourhit (BEL)	12:49.71	Brussels, Belgium	25 August 2000
Championship record	Jack Buckner (GBR)	13:10.15	Stuttgart, West Germany	31 August 1986
World Leading	Edwin Soi (KEN)	12:59.82	Paris, France	5 July 2014
European Leading	Andy Vernon (GBR)	13:11.50	Stanford, United States	2 June 2012

== Schedule ==
Date	Time	Round
17 August 2014	18:30	Final

All times are local times (UTC+2)

== Results ==
=== Final ===
Rank	Name	Nationality	Time	Note
1st place, gold medalist(s)	Mo Farah	Great Britain	14:05.82	
2nd place, silver medalist(s)	Hayle Ibrahimov	Azerbaijan	14:08.32	
3rd place, bronze medalist(s)	Andy Vernon	Great Britain	14:09.48	
4	Richard Ringer	Germany	14:10.92	
5	Roberto Alaiz	Spain	14:11.47	
6	Bouabdellah Tahri	France	14:11.62	
7	Arne Gabius	Germany	14:11.84	
8	Antonio Abadía	Spain	14:11.89	
9	Ali Kaya	Turkey	14:12.53	
10	Tiidrek Nurme	Estonia	14:13.89	SB
11	Jesús España	Spain	14:14.57	
12	Tom Farrell	Great Britain	14:15.93	
13	Brenton Rowe	Austria	14:16.46	
14	Marouan Razine	Italy	14:16.95	
15	Soufiane Bouchikhi	Belgium	14:17.43	
16	Bashir Abdi	Belgium	14:24.73	
