= Yevgeny Rybakov =

Russian long-distance runner

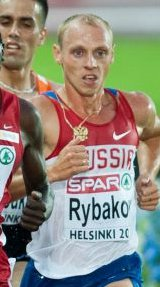
- Rybakov in 2012

Personal information
- Full name: Yevgeny Rybakov
- Born: 27 February 1985 (age 41)

Sport
- Country: Russia
- Sport: Men's athletics
- Event(s): Long-distance events Cross country running

Achievements and titles
- Regional finals: 3rd at the 2012 European Athletics Championships
- Personal best(s): 5000 metres: 13:31.36; 10,000 metres: 28:06.54

Yevgeny Rybakov (Russian: Евгений Николаевич Рыбаков; born 27 February 1985) is a Russian long-distance runner who competes in the track and road events. His twin brother, Anatoly, is also a long-distance runner.

Rybakov won the bronze medal at the 2012 European Athletics Championships in Helsinki at the 10,000 metres event.

== Competition record ==
Year	Competition	Venue	Position	Event	Notes
Representing Russia
2002	European Cross Country Championships	Medulin, Croatia	1st	Junior race (6.17 km)	18:16
2002	European Cross Country Championships	Medulin, Croatia	1st	Junior race - Team	37 pts
2003	European Cross Country Championships	Edinburgh, United Kingdom	1st	Junior race (6.595 km)	20:52
2003	European Cross Country Championships	Edinburgh, United Kingdom	1st	Junior race - Team	20pts
2004	World Junior Championships	Grosseto, Italy	9th	10,000m	29:25.77
2004	European Cross Country Championships	Heringsdorf, Germany	2nd	Junior race (5.64 km)	20:52
2004	European Cross Country Championships	Heringsdorf, Germany	1st	Junior race - Team	40 pts
2005	European U23 Championships	Erfurt, Germany	1st	10,000 m	29:30.76
2006	European Cross Country Championships	San Giorgio su Legnano, Italy	4th	U23 race (8.03 km)	23:17
2006	European Cross Country Championships	San Giorgio su Legnano, Italy	1st	U23 race - Team	28 pts
2007	European Cross Country Championships	Toro, Spain	2nd	U23 race (8.2 km)	24:33
2007	European Cross Country Championships	Toro, Spain	3rd	U23 race - Team	65 pts
2010	European Championships	Barcelona, Spain	18th (h)	5000 m	13:52.58
2010	European Cross Country Championships	Albufeira, Portugal	11th	Senior race (9.87 km)	29:35
2010	European Cross Country Championships	Albufeira, Portugal	6th	Senior race - Team	106 pts
2011	European Team Championships Super League	Stockholm, Sweden	4th	5000 m	13:40.63
2011	Universiade	Shenzhen, China	2nd	5000 m	14:00.60
2011	Universiade	Shenzhen, China	4th	10,000 m	29:10.86
2012	European Championships	Helsinki, Finland	3rd	10,000 m	28:22.95
2013	Universiade	Kazan, Russia	5th	5000 m	13:46.28
2013	Universiade	Kazan, Russia	3rd	10,000 m	28:47.28
2013	World Championships	Moscow, Russia	25th	10,000 m	28:47.49
2014	European Championships	Zürich, Switzerland	10th	10,000 m	28:53.48
Competing as Authorised Neutral Athlete
2018	European Championships	Berlin, Germany	20th	10,000 m	29:15.30
