= Charlotte Purdue =

British long-distance runner (born 1991)

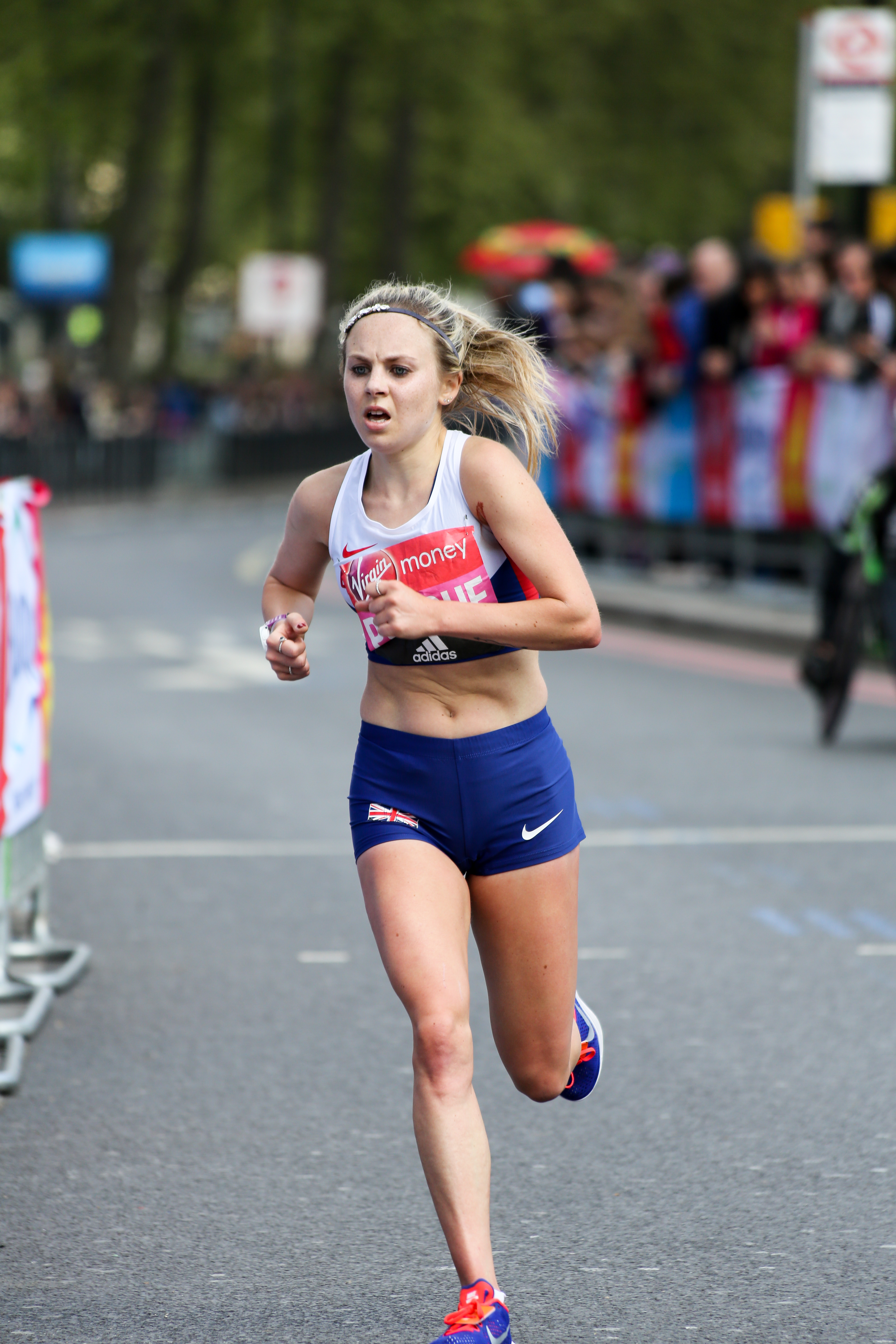
- Purdue at the 2017 London Marathon

Personal information
- Full name: Charlotte Lucy Purdue
- Nationality: English
- Born: 10 June 1991 (age 35) Windsor, Berkshire, England

Sport
- Country: England
- Sport: Athletics/Cross Country Running
- Club: Aldershot, Farnham & District AC
- Coached by: Mick Woods 2004–2014 Nic Bideau 2014–present
Medal record
Women's athletics
Representing Great Britain
European Cross Country Championships
| Gold medal – first place | 2007 Toro | Junior team |
| Gold medal – first place | 2010 Albufeira | Junior race |
| Gold medal – first place | 2010 Albufeira | Junior team |
| Gold medal – first place | 2013 Belgrade | U23 team |
| Silver medal – second place | 2008 Brussels | Junior race |
| Bronze medal – third place | 2007 Toro | Junior race |
| Bronze medal – third place | 2013 Belgrade | U23 race |
European Junior Championships
| Silver medal – second place | 2009 Novi Sad | 5000 m |
- Updated on 7 December 2013

Charlotte Lucy Purdue (born 10 June 1991) is a British long-distance runner who competes in the Marathon and Half Marathon, as well as cross country running for Aldershot, Farnham and District Athletics Club. After winning a number of youth titles at national level, she had her first international success at the European Cross Country Championships, winning medals in the junior races of 2007 and 2008. She was also the best European junior at the World Cross Country Championships those years.

She won a 5000 m silver medal at the 2009 European Junior Championships and went on to represent England at the 2010 Commonwealth Games. She won the junior individual and team gold medals at the 2010 European Cross Country Championships. Purdue holds the UK junior record for the 10,000 m with a time of 32:36.75 minutes.

== Early life and education ==
Purdue was born in Windsor, Berkshire and grew up in Hook, Hampshire. She attended Farnborough Hill and studied history at St Mary's University, Twickenham.

== Career ==
Purdue began competing for Aldershot, Farnham and District Athletic Club around the age of thirteen. She also practised ballet, achieving UK grade five. She won her first national youth titles in 2006, winning the 3000 metres at the AAA under-17 championships and the UK School Games, as well as the English under-fifteens cross country title. She quickly progressed to international competition and came fifteenth in the junior section of the 2007 IAAF World Cross Country Championships – the best European performer in the race. She was the youngest runner in the 5000 metres field at the 2007 European Athletics Junior Championships and finished in tenth place. She won the UK junior trials for the 2007 European Cross Country Championships and went on to take the individual bronze medal and team gold medal at the championships, which she shared with fellow British junior Steph Twell.

In 2008 Purdue did not improve her position at the 2008 IAAF World Cross Country Championships, ending the junior race in 16th place, but remained the top European performer. She made her senior international debut for Great Britain and Northern Ireland in 2008, running a 5 km leg of the Chiba Ekiden Relay in Japan and helping the team to seventh in the rankings. She improved one place further at the 2008 European Cross Country Championships, taking the silver medal behind Twell in a British-dominated race which saw the country take the top six positions in the junior race.

At the 2009 IAAF World Cross Country Championships, she came fourteenth in the junior race and helped the British girls to fourth in the team rankings. She secured her first international track medal at the 2009 European Athletics Junior Championships by winning the 5000 m silver in Novi Sad. She also began to prove herself in the senior ranks that year – at the national championships she took the runner-up spot in the 5000 m behind Freya Murray and came fourth at the Great Yorkshire Run in September with a 10K best of 33:07 minutes. The 18-year-old suffered an injury in November (a knee stress fracture) which ruled her out until the middle of 2010. This meant she missed both the European and World Cross Country Championships, as well as the 2010 World Junior Championships in Athletics.

Purdue returned to competition in June 2010, coming seventh in the 10,000 metres national championship race. That August she improved her 5000 m personal best to 15:23.4 and also bettered her 10,000 m mark with a run of 32:36.75 (a junior record for the United Kingdom). She earned selection for both events at the 2010 Commonwealth Games. After a second-place finish at the Yorkshire Run, she headed to New Delhi where she came fourth in the 10,000 m final and sixth in the 5000 m. She won the junior race at the European Cross Trials in Liverpool in November and went on to take the individual and team titles in the junior race at the 2010 European Cross Country Championships. In her last year as a junior runner, she easily won the competition with seventeen seconds to spare over the runner-up.

She took her first win on the senior international circuit in January 2011, holding off Esther Chemtai and Louise Damen to capture the Antrim International Cross Country women's title. She stepped up to the senior level for the 2011 IAAF World Cross Country Championships and came 14th – Europe's top performer in the race and one of only two non-Africans in the top 15 (alongside Shalane Flanagan). A month later she won the Great Ireland Run by a margin of twenty seconds. She underwent knee surgery and missed the track season as a result. She returned to form with a fourth-place finish at the Great South Run 10-mile race in October.

A foot injury interrupted the start of 2012, but she returned to the Great Ireland Run in April and was runner-up to Gemma Steel. She was the top British finisher (fourth) at the Great Manchester Run in May. Over 10,000 metres she set a best of 32:03.55 minutes at the Payton Jordan Invitational and later placed seventh at the European Cup 10000m and sixth at the 2012 European Athletics Championships. She failed to qualify for the London Olympic Games that year.

She did not compete from July 2012 until October 2013. Having recovered from injury, she returned at the Great South Run and managed third place at the ten-mile race with a time of 56:57 minutes.

On 7 September 2014, she set a personal best for the half marathon 1:14:43 on the course of the Great North Run.

On 24 April 2016, Purdue completed her first full marathon distance having run the 2016 London Marathon. As a part of the women elite group she took 16th place overall and third among the British competitors with the time of 2:32:48.

On 23 April 2017, Purdue ran her personal best time in the marathon at the London Marathon in two hours and 29 minutes and 23 seconds, finishing second Brit behind Alison Dixon.

On 6 August 2017, Purdue finished 13th at the IAAF World Championships in London in a time of 2:29:48 and was the first British female across the line.

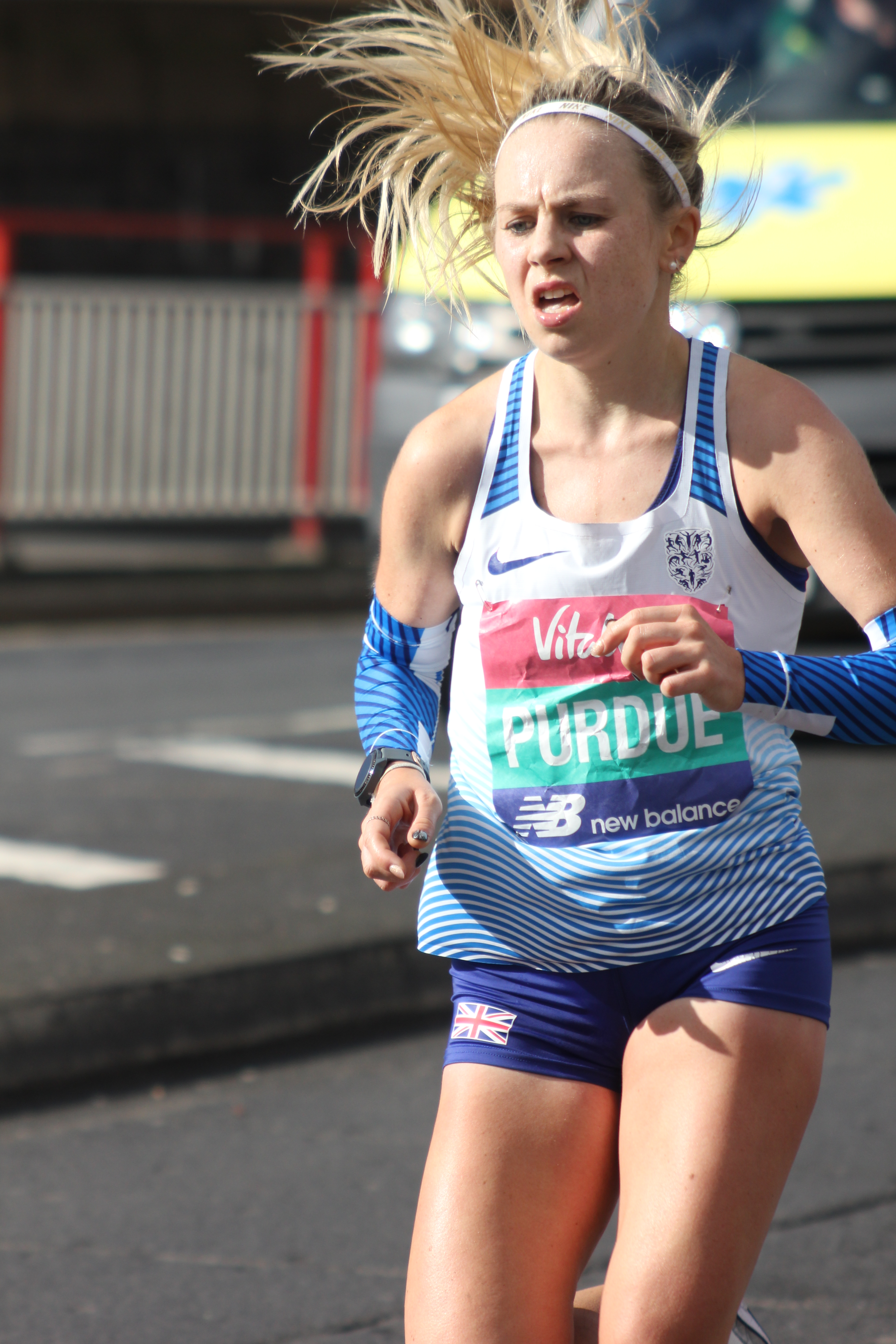
Charlotte Purdue competing in 2019 London Half Marathon.

On 2 February 2019, Purdue set a new personal best for the half marathon, clocking 1:09:46 at Marugame in Japan.

Having won the inaugural event the previous year, on 10 March 2019, Purdue won the Vitality Big Half London half marathon in a time of 1:10:38. In 2021, she won the event for a third time.

On 3 October 2021, Purdue moved to third on the British all-time list running 2:23.26 at the 2021 London Marathon.

She competed in the women's marathon at the 2022 World Athletics Championships held in Eugene, Oregon, United States, but did not finish the race.

At the 2023 Berlin Marathon, Purdue moved up to second on the British all-time list as she finished ninth in a time of 2:22:17.

In February 2024, she was named in the Great Britain marathon team for the Paris Olympics. Purdue withdrew from the Olympics just days before she was scheduled to race due to an ankle injury during her final practice run. Purdue was replaced by Clara Evans.

== Major competition record ==
| Year | Competition | Venue | Position | Event | Notes |
|---|---|---|---|---|---|
| 2007 | World Cross Country Championships | Mombasa, Kenya | 15th | Junior race | |
| 2007 | European Junior Championships | Hengelo, Netherlands | 10th | 5000 m | |
| 2007 | European Cross Country Championships | Toro, Spain | 3rd | Junior race | Individual |
| 2007 | European Cross Country Championships | Toro, Spain | 1st | Junior race | Team |
| 2008 | World Cross Country Championships | Edinburgh, Scotland | 16th | Junior race | |
| 2008 | European Cross Country Championships | Brussels, Belgium | 2nd | Junior race | Individual |
| 2008 | European Cross Country Championships | Brussels, Belgium | 1st | Junior race | Team |
| 2009 | World Cross Country Championships | Amman, Jordan | 14th | Junior race | |
| 2009 | European Junior Championships | Novi Sad, Serbia | 2nd | 5000 m | |
| 2010 | Commonwealth Games | New Delhi, India | 6th | 5000 m | |
| 2010 | Commonwealth Games | New Delhi, India | 4th | 10,000 m | |
| 2010 | European Cross Country Championships | Albufeira, Portugal | 1st | Junior race | Individual |
| 2010 | European Cross Country Championships | Albufeira, Portugal | 1st | Junior race | Team |
| 2011 | World Cross Country Championships | Punta Umbría, Spain | 14th | Senior race | 8 km |
| 2012 | European Championships | Helsinki, Finland | 6th | 10,000 m | |
| 2014 | Great North Run | South Shields, England | 8th | Half marathon | |
| 2016 | London Marathon | London, England | 16th | Marathon | |
| 2017 | Reading Half Marathon | Reading, United Kingdom | 1st | Half marathon | 1:12:15 |
| 2018 | The Big Half | London, United Kingdom | 1st | Half marathon | 1:10:29 |
| 2019 | The Big Half | London, United Kingdom | 1st | Half marathon | 1:10:38 |
| 2019 | London Marathon | London, England | 10th | Marathon | 2:25:38 |
| 2019 | World Championships | Doha, Qatar | – | Marathon | DNF |
| 2021 | The Big Half | London, United Kingdom | 1st | Half marathon | 1:09:51 |
| 2021 | London Marathon | London, England | 10th | Marathon | 2:23:26 |
| 2022 | Boston Marathon | Boston, USA | 9th | Marathon | 2:25:26 |
| 2022 | World Championships | Eugene, United States | – | Marathon | DNF |
| 2023 | Berlin Marathon | Berlin, Germany | 9th | Marathon | 2:22:17 |

== Personal bests ==
- 5000 metres – 15:23.40 (2010)
- 10,000 metres – 32:03.55 (2012)
- Half marathon – 1:08:02 (2024)
- Marathon - 2:22.17 (2023)
