= 2003 European Athletics U23 Championships – Men's 5000 metres =

The men's 5000 metres event at the 2003 European Athletics U23 Championships was held in Bydgoszcz, Poland, at Zawisza Stadion on 20 July.

== Medalists ==
Gold	Chris Thompson; United Kingdom
Silver	Mo Farah; United Kingdom
Bronze	Robert Connolly; Ireland

== Results ==
=== Final ===
20 July

Rank	Name	Nationality	Time	Notes
1st place, gold medalist(s)	Chris Thompson	United Kingdom	13:58.62	
2nd place, silver medalist(s)	Mo Farah	United Kingdom	13:58.88	
3rd place, bronze medalist(s)	Robert Connolly	Ireland	14:03.75	
4	Vasyl Matviychuk	Ukraine	14:10.19	
5	Stefano Scaini	Italy	14:11.91	
6	Mark Kenneally	Ireland	14:13.24	
7	André Pollmächer	Germany	14:14.79	
8	Hassam Outchich	France	14:16.89	
9	Krijn Van Koolwyk	Belgium	14:19.85	
10	Patrick Stitzinger	Netherlands	14:25.99	
11	José Manuel Moreno	Spain	14:30.49	
12	Dirk de Heer	Netherlands	14:33.02	
13	Tim Clerbout	Belgium	14:34.55	
14	Benoit Charpantier	France	14:42.83	
15	Henrik Ahnström	Sweden	14:50.11	
16	Mirko Petrović	Serbia and Montenegro	14:51.12	
17	Aleksandr Nikolayuk	Belarus	14:52.92	
18	Tristan Druet	Ireland	14:53.93	
19	Marius Gheorghe	Romania	15:01.32	
	Paweł Ochal	Poland	DNF	
	Rui Pedro Silva	Portugal	DNF	
	Ruslan Nazipov	Russia	DNF	

== Participation ==
According to an unofficial count, 22 athletes from 16 countries participated in the event.

- Belarus (1)
- Belgium (2)
- France (2)
- Germany (1)
- Ireland (3)
- Italy (1)
- Netherlands (2)
- Poland (1)
- Portugal (1)
- Romania (1)
- Russia (1)
- Serbia and Montenegro (1)
- Spain (1)
- Sweden (1)
- Ukraine (1)
- United Kingdom (2)
