= Athletics at the 2013 Summer Universiade – Men's 5000 metres =

The men's 5000 metres event at the 2013 Summer Universiade was held on 10–12 July.

== Medalists ==
Gold	Silver	Bronze
Hayle Ibrahimov; Azerbaijan	Paul Chelimo; Kenya	Richard Ringer; Germany

== Results ==
=== Heats ===
Qualification: First 5 in each heat (Q) and the next 5 fastest (q) qualified for the final.

Rank	Heat	Name	Nationality	Time	Notes
1	1	Hayle Ibrahimov	Azerbaijan	13:50.75	Q
2	1	Jeromy Andreas	South Africa	14:02.65	Q
3	1	Stefano La Rosa	Italy	14:03.93	Q
4	1	Andrew Nixon	Canada	14:04.08	Q
5	1	Tiidrek Nurme	Estonia	14:06.85	Q
6	1	Andrey Safronov	Russia	14:09.82	q
7	1	Kemal Koyuncu	Turkey	14:12.10	q
8	1	Ibrahim Omar Abdi	Djibouti	14:18.01	q
9	2	Paul Chelimo	Kenya	14:19.16	Q
10	2	Richard Ringer	Germany	14:19.20	Q
11	2	Evgeny Rybakov	Russia	14:19.81	Q
12	2	Lucas Bruchet	Canada	14:21.79	Q
13	2	Andries Hlaselo	South Africa	14:22.05	Q
14	2	Jesús Arturo Esparza	Mexico	14:23.09	q
15	1	Dessie Getnet	Ethiopia	14:38.34	q
16	2	Pol Mellina	Luxembourg	14:40.65	
17	1	Víctor Manuel González	Guatemala	14:41.27	
18	2	Priit Aus	Estonia	14:45.87	
19	1	Benjamin Njia	Uganda	14:45.96	
20	2	Allan Makweta	Uganda	14:46.04	
21	1	Jānis Girgensons	Latvia	14:49.22	
22	2	Adrian Trifan	Romania	15:00.28	
23	2	Kaspars Briska	Latvia	15:15.01	
24	2	William Awunime Akuka	Ghana	15:20.67	
25	2	Mohamadou Adamou	Cameroon	15:22.58	
26	2	Anders Ludvigsen	Denmark	15:38.01	
27	2	Munyaradzi Gorimbo	Zimbabwe	16:24.64	
	1	Abdullahi Barre	Somalia	DNF	
	1	Rajendra Bind	India	DNF	
	2	Johannes Alnes	Norway	DNF	
	1	K.C. Anup	Nepal	DNS	
	1	Jean Paul Mugabo	Rwanda	DNS	

=== Final ===
Rank	Name	Nationality	Time	Notes
1st place, gold medalist(s)	Hayle Ibrahimov	Azerbaijan	13:35.89	UR
2nd place, silver medalist(s)	Paul Chelimo	Kenya	13:37.09	
3rd place, bronze medalist(s)	Richard Ringer	Germany	13:37.18	
4	Stefano La Rosa	Italy	13:40.42	SB
5	Evgeny Rybakov	Russia	13:46.28	
6	Jeromy Andreas	South Africa	13:56.94	
7	Andrey Safronov	Russia	14:01.74	
8	Tiidrek Nurme	Estonia	14:08.02	
9	Lucas Bruchet	Canada	14:08.59	
10	Jesús Arturo Esparza	Mexico	14:19.67	
11	Ibrahim Omar Abdi	Djibouti	14:21.17	
12	Andrew Nixon	Canada	14:32.83	
13	Dessie Getnet	Ethiopia	14:33.59	
	Andries Hlaselo	South Africa	DNF	
	Kemal Koyuncu	Turkey	DNF	
