= Athletics at the 2011 Summer Universiade – Men's 5000 metres =

The men's 5000 metres event at the 2011 Summer Universiade was held on 19–21 August.

== Medalists ==
Gold	Silver	Bronze
Andy Vernon; Great Britain	Evgeny Rybakov; Russia	Stefano La Rosa; Italy

== Results ==
=== Heats ===
Qualification: First 5 in each heat (Q) and the next 5 fastest (q) qualified for the final.

Rank	Heat	Name	Nationality	Time	Notes
1	2	Evgeny Rybakov	Russia	14:09.41	Q
2	2	Joseph Chebet	Uganda	14:11.44	Q
3	2	Hugo Beamish	New Zealand	14:13.94	Q
4	2	Tian Huadong	China	14:18.11	Q
5	2	Andy Vernon	Great Britain	14:18.15	Q
6	2	Ikuto Yufu	Japan	14:18.87	q
7	1	Mohammed Meftahelkhair	Morocco	14:21.86	Q
8	1	Diego Borrego	Mexico	14:22.21	Q
9	1	Tiidrek Nurme	Estonia	14:22.34	Q
10	1	Andrey Safronov	Russia	14:22.47	Q
11	1	Tshamano Setone	South Africa	14:22.58	Q
12	1	Víctor Aravena	Chile	14:22.66	q
13	1	Ben Toroitich Kiplagat	Uganda	14:23.41	q
14	2	Stefano La Rosa	Italy	14:25.94	q
15	1	Tariq Ahmed Alamri	Saudi Arabia	14:27.85	q
16	1	Getachew Kebede	Ethiopia	14:28.27	SB
17	2	Gert Manora	South Africa	14:29.57	
18	2	Mohmmad Khazaei	Iran	14:33.63	
19	2	Mathew Kiptoo	Kenya	14:38.49	
20	2	Antonio Abadía	Spain	14:46.31	
21	1	Eric Ndikuriyo	Burundi	15:04.99	
22	2	Sergei Tšerepannikov	Estonia	15:07.56	
23	1	Kim Byunghyun	South Korea	15:09.84	
24	2	Jonathan Cerrud	Panama	15:49.63	
25	2	Ahmed Abdullah Alzubaidi	Saudi Arabia	15:50.00	
26	1	Godwin Oduro Friko	Ghana	16:37.46	
27	1	Fortunate Hlakama	Zimbabwe	16:48.80	
	2	Henrik Lofas	Sweden	DNF	
	1	Stephon Josiah	Guyana	DNS	
	1	Suguru Osako	Japan	DNS	
	1	Damian Sikuka	Zambia	DNS	
	2	Obed Tiony Kipkemboi	Kenya	DNS	
	2	Kelly Wiebe	Canada	DNS	

=== Final ===
Rank	Name	Nationality	Time	Notes
1st place, gold medalist(s)	Andy Vernon	Great Britain	14:00.06	
2nd place, silver medalist(s)	Evgeny Rybakov	Russia	14:00.60	
3rd place, bronze medalist(s)	Stefano La Rosa	Italy	14:02.95	
4	Tiidrek Nurme	Estonia	14:05.03	
5	Andrey Safronov	Russia	14:08.07	
6	Hugo Beamish	New Zealand	14:08.72	SB
7	Mohammed Meftahelkhair	Morocco	14:08.89	
8	Tariq Ahmed Alamri	Saudi Arabia	14:11.06	
9	Joseph Chebet	Uganda	14:14.02	
10	Víctor Aravena	Chile	14:16.50	
11	Tshamano Setone	South Africa	14:19.31	
12	Diego Borrego	Mexico	14:19.82	
13	Tian Huadong	China	14:20.30	
14	Ikuto Yufu	Japan	14:38.29	
15	Ben Toroitich Kiplagat	Uganda	DNF	
