= Rui Pedro Silva =

Portuguese track and field athlete

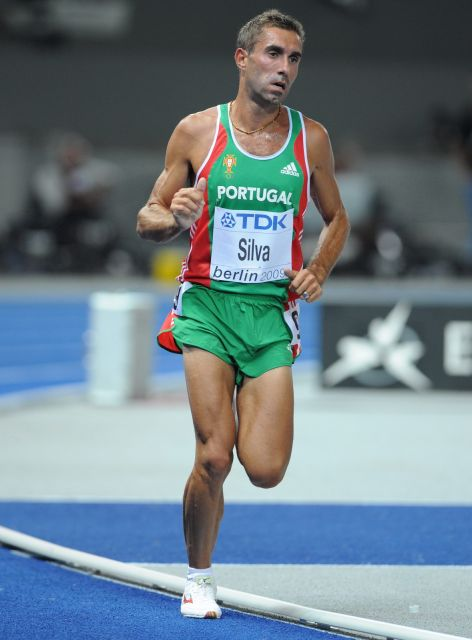
- Rui Pedro Silva at the 2009 World Championships in Athletics, in Berlin

Personal information
- Born: 6 May 1981 (age 45)
- Height: 1.73 m (5 ft 8 in)
- Weight: 60 kg (130 lb)

Sport
- Country: Portugal
- Sport: Athletics
- Events: Marathon, 10,000 m

Rui Pedro Silva (born 6 May 1981 in Santo Tirso) is a Portuguese track and field athlete specialized in long distance and cross country running.

With Benfica, he won the Portuguese Road Men's Championship on 12 January 2014, repeating the achievement of 2009. On 11 January 2015, he won the title again in the same competition.

== Competition record ==
Year	Competition	Venue	Position	Event	Notes
Representing Portugal
2003	European U23 Championships	Bydgoszcz, Poland	—	5000m	DNF
2004	Ibero-American Championships	Huelva, Spain	10th	5000 m	14:32.85
2006	European Cross Country Championships	San Giorgio su Legnano, Italy	5th	Senior race	Individual
2006	European Cross Country Championships	San Giorgio su Legnano, Italy	3rd	Senior race	Team
2008	Olympic Games	Beijing, China	34th	10,000 m	29:09.03
2008	European Cross Country Championships	Brussels, Belgium	8th	Senior race	Individual
2008	European Cross Country Championships	Brussels, Belgium	8th	Senior race	Team
2009	Lusophony Games	Lisbon, Portugal	1st	10 km	30:14
2009	World Championships	Berlin, Germany	23rd	10,000 m	28:51.40
2010	European Championships	Barcelona, Spain	–	10,000 m	DNF
2010	European Cross Country Championships	Albufeira, Portugal	8th	Senior race	Individual
2010	European Cross Country Championships	Albufeira, Portugal	2nd	Senior race	Team
2012	European Championships	Helsinki, Finland	8th	10,000 m	28:31.16
2012	Olympic Games	London, United Kingdom	–	Marathon	DNF
2016	European Championships	Amsterdam, Netherlands	76th	Half marathon	1:10:04

== Personal Bests ==
- 1500m – 3:52.77 (2002)
- 3000m – 8:02.37 (2005)
- 5000m – 13:48.87 (2010)
- 10000m – 28:01.63 (2009)
- 3000m Steeplechase – 8:52.66 (2002)
- Half Marathon – 1:02:38 (2012)
- Marathon – 2:12:15 (2012)
