= Frank Tickner =

British athlete

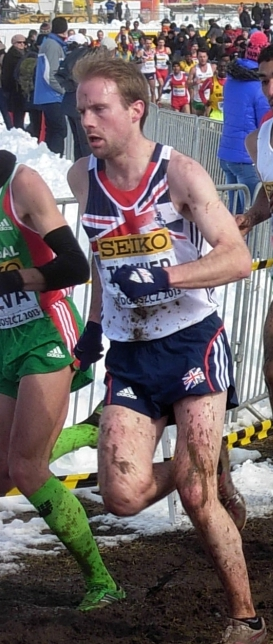
Frank Tickner competing at the 2013 World Cross Country Championships

Francis (Frank) Tickner (born 12 October 1983) is a British cross country runner.

== Career ==
Tickner placed 1st in the English Cross Country Championships in 2007 and 2009.

He has represented Great Britain at World championships:

- Tickner finished 45th in the senior men's race at the 2013 IAAF World Cross Country Championships.
- Tickner was 73rd in the senior men's race at the 2009 IAAF World Cross Country Championships.
- Tickner came 72nd in the senior men's race at the 2008 IAAF World Cross Country Championships.
- Tickner was placed 83rd in the senior men's race at the 2006 IAAF World Cross Country Championships.

Tickner has also represented Great Britain at European championships. He finished 10th in the men’s individual 10km at the 2008 European Cross Country Championships.

== Education ==
Frank Tickner studied French and English at Birmingham University, graduating in 2007.
