= 2010 European Cross Country Championships =

Coordinates: 37°05′32″N 8°09′43″W

- Organisers: EAA
- Edition: 17th
- Date: 12 December
- Host city: Albufeira, Portugal
- Events: 6
- Distances: 9870 m – Men; 8170 m – Women; 8170 m – U23 men 6070 m – U23 women 6070 m – Junior men 3970 m – Junior women
- Participation: 468 athletes from 34 nations
- Official website: Albufeira2010

The 2010 European Cross Country Championships was a continental cross country running competition that took place on 12 December in Albufeira, Portugal. It was the second time that the country hosted the event, building upon the 1997 edition held in Oeiras.

Serhiy Lebid won the men's race for his ninth victory of the championship – a record for the competition. France took the men's team title. Jessica Augusto comprehensively won the women's race for the host nation and also led the Portuguese team to a team gold medal. At total of 468 athletes from a record number of 34 nations competed at the event.

== Competition ==
=== Preparation ===
The race took place on a purpose-built course near the city, which also hosts the annual Almond Blossom Cross Country. Albufeira was chosen as the host at the 120th European Athletics Council Meeting in October 2008, defeating a rival bid from Velenje (which was chosen for the 2011 edition instead).

Hayley Yelling entered the race as the defending women's champion while Alemayehu Bezabeh, the reigning men's champion, did not take part in the competition. High-profile investigations into doping in Spain immediately preceded the championships and Bezabeh was among the athletes implicated in Operación Galgo. As both the reigning champion and the 2009 silver medallist Mo Farah were absent, the men's race was seen as a relatively open competition, with Ukrainian Serhiy Lebid, Spanish runners Ayad Lamdassem and Jesús España being the foremost protagonists. The withdrawal of Rosa Morató (runner-up in 2009) left Jessica Augusto as the provisional favourite for the women's race. Forming a strong team, three other Portuguese runners (Ana Dulce Félix, Marisa Barros and Sara Moreira) were expected to challenge for medals, as were Yelling and Adriënne Herzog (also directly implicated in Operación Galgo), who was third the previous year.

=== Races ===
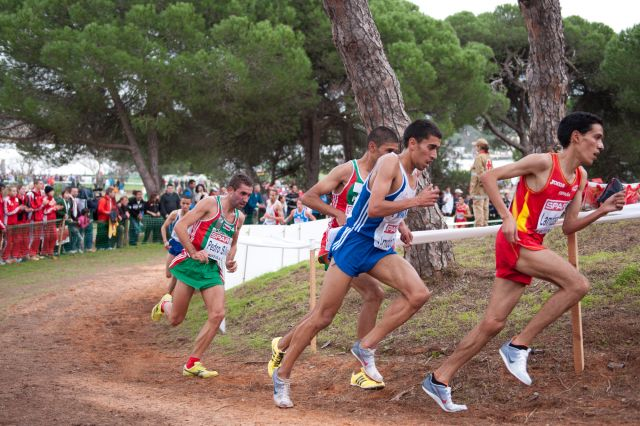
The men's race

The men's race remained relatively tight until the final lap. Six men were on equal footing at the bell: Lebid, Lamdassem, French duo Morhad Amdouni and Abdellatif Meftah, and Rui Pedro Silva and Yousef El Kalai, both representing the hosts. Lamdassem was the first to move away from the pack, seizing the lead, and only Lebid followed. The Ukrainian overhauled Lamdassem in the final stages and maintained a clear lead to win his ninth title – a record for the competition. Lamdassem just held off a late sprint from El Kalai to take the runner-up spot. Meftah and Amdouni finished shortly after for fourth and fifth, leading the French men to a team victory.

Jessica Augusto made her gold medal intentions known as she took the lead in the opening stages. The Portuguese athlete never relinquished the position and produced a largely unrivalled, solo performance. Spaniard Alessandra Aguilar shadowed her in the middle part of the race but later dropped out of contention. With Augusto clear in front, Binnaz Uslu, Ana Dulce Félix, Fionnuala Britton and Tetyana Holovchenko battled for the minor medals in the second half of the race. Félix and Uslu fought for the runner-up spot with the Turk eventually winning out. Augusto's lead was so significant that she slowed and celebrated throughout the home straight, still crossing the line with a five-second advantage. Félix took the bronze just ahead Britton, helping the Portuguese women to the team gold medal, and Holovchenko rounded out the top five.

Hassan Chahdi of France took the men's under-23 title while Ethiopian-born Meryem Erdoğan won the women's under-23 section for Turkey. The junior races were won by Abdelaziz Merzougui and Charlotte Purdue.

== Race results ==
=== Senior men ===
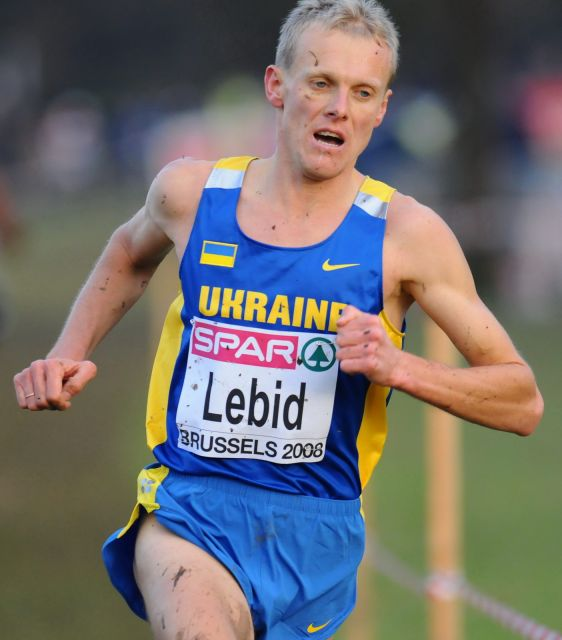
Serhiy Lebid took the men's title for a record ninth time.

Individual race
Rank	Athlete	Country	Time (m:s)
Gold medal	Serhiy Lebid	Ukraine	29:15
Silver medal	Ayad Lamdassem	Spain	29:18
Bronze medal	Yousef El Kalai	Portugal	29:19
4	Abdellatif Meftah	France	29:21
5	Morhad Amdouni	France	29:21
6	Andrea Lalli	Italy	29:28
7	Eduardo Mbengani	Portugal	29:29
8	Rui Pedro Silva	Portugal	29:32
9	Jesús España	Spain	29:32
10	Mokhtar Benhari	France	29:34
11	Yevgeniy Rybakov	Russia	29:35
12	Steffen Uliczka	Germany	29:36

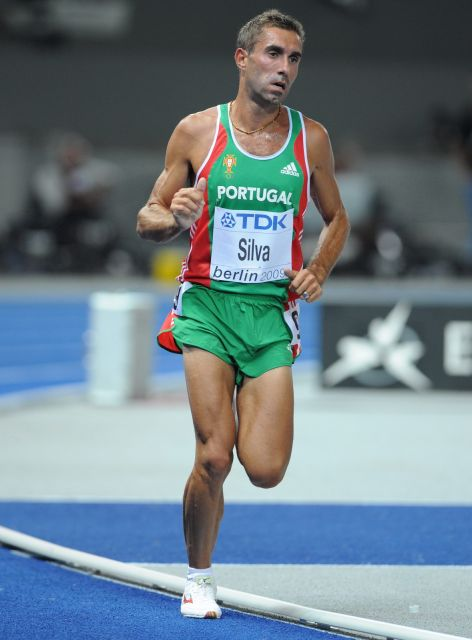
Rui Pedro Silva was eighth and earned a team silver with Portugal.

Team race
Rank	Team	Points
Gold medal	France; Meftah; Amdouni; Benhari; Driss El Himer	33
Silver medal	Portugal; El Kalai; Mbengani; Rui Pedro Silva; Rui Silva	35
Bronze medal	Spain; Lamdassem; España; Ricardo Serrano; Francisco Javier López	58
4	Italy	96
5	United Kingdom	99
6	Russia	106
7	Ireland	142
8	Denmark	181

- Totals: 75 entrants, 74 starters, 71 finishers, 10 teams.

=== Senior women ===
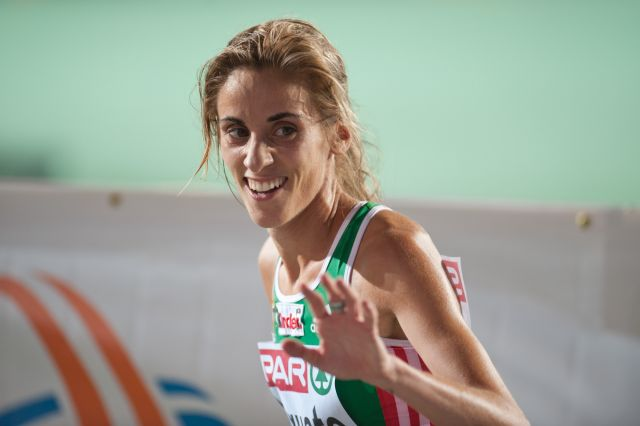
Race winner Jessica Augusto also led Portugal to the team title.

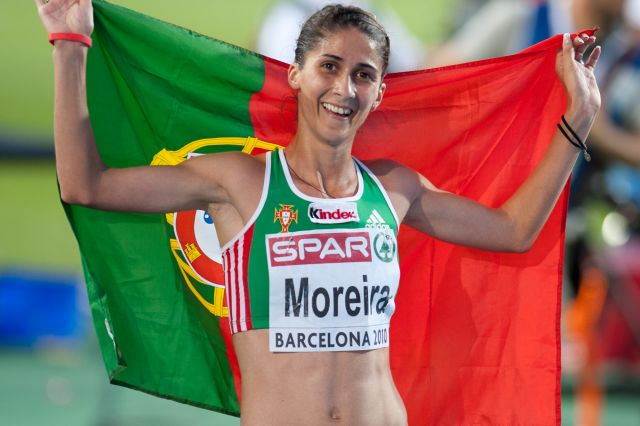
Sara Moreira was one of five Portuguese women in the top ten.

Individual race
Rank	Athlete	Country	Time (m:s)
Gold medal	Jéssica Augusto	Portugal	26:52
Silver medal	Binnaz Uslu	Turkey	26:57
Bronze medal	Ana Dulce Félix	Portugal	26:59
4	Fionnuala Britton	Ireland	26:59
5	Tetyana Holovchenko	Ukraine	27:04
6	Marisa Barros	Portugal	27:06
7	Hatti Dean	United Kingdom	27:08
8	Alessandra Aguilar	Spain	27:09
9	Sara Moreira	Portugal	27:26
10	Ana Dias	Portugal	27:27
11	Fatiha Klilech-Fauvel	France	27:27
12	Maria Sig Møller	Denmark	27:31

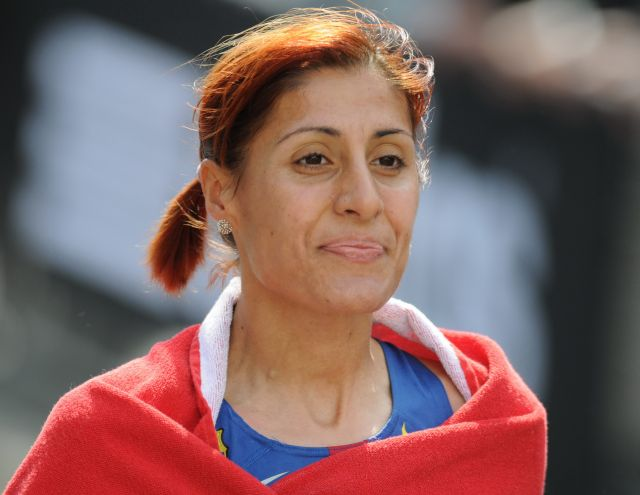
The Spanish team was led to the bronze by Alessandra Aguilar.

Team race
Rank	Team	Points
Gold medal	Portugal; Augusto; Félix; Barros; Moreira	19
Silver medal	United Kingdom; Dean; Louise Damen; Stephanie Twell; Helen Clitheroe	65
Bronze medal	Spain; Aguilar; Diana Martín; Nuria Fernández; Irene Pelayo	72
4	France	79
5	Russia	101
6	Ireland	132
7	Italy	147

- Totals: 49 entrants, 49 starters, 47 finishers, 7 teams.

=== Under-23 men ===
Individual race
Rank	Athlete	Country	Time (m:s)
Gold medal	Hassan Chahdi	France	24:11
Silver medal	Florian Carvalho	France	24:14
Bronze medal	Yegor Nikolayev	Russia	24:15
4	Jeroen d'Hoedt	Belgium	24:23
5	Ricardo Mateus	Portugal	24:25
6	Siarhei Platonau	Belarus	24:28
7	Tiago Costa	Portugal	24:32
8	Sindre Buraas	Norway	24:34
9	Ricky Stevenson	United Kingdom	24:34
10	Florian Orth	Germany	24:44
11	David McCarthy	Ireland	24:46
12	Sebastián Martos	Spain	24:47

Team race
Rank	Team	Points
Gold medal	Ireland; McCarthy; Brendan O'Neill; Michael Mulhare; David Rooney	60
Silver medal	France; Chahdi; Carvalho; Abdelatif Hadjam; Etienne Diemunsch	78
Bronze medal	Spain; Martos; Antonia Abadía; Javier García; Víctor Corrales	79
4	United Kingdom	104
5	Norway	112
6	Belgium	114
7	Portugal	133
8	Germany	134

- Totals: 102 entrants, 102 starters, 96 finishers, 16 teams.

=== Under-23 women ===
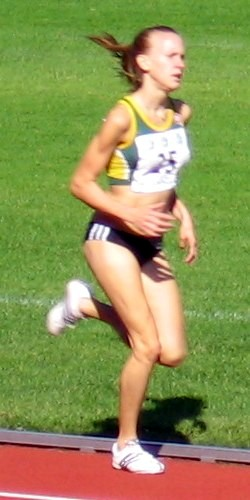
Finland's Sandra Eriksson was sixth in the under-23 race.

Individual race
Rank	Athlete	Country	Time (m:s)
Gold medal	Meryem Erdoğan	Turkey	20:08
Silver medal	Cristina Jordán	Spain	20:17
Bronze medal	Emma Pallant	United Kingdom	20:28
4	Hanna Nosenko	Ukraine	20:36
5	Roxana Birca	Romania	20:39
6	Sandra Eriksson	Finland	20:41
7	Nathalie Gray	United Kingdom	20:43
8	Viktoriya Pohorielska	Ukraine	20:46
9	Yekatyerina Gorbunova	Russia	20:46
10	Lucie Sekanová	Czech Republic	20:47
11	Patricia Laubertie	France	20:47
12	Natalya Vlasova	Russia	20:47

Team race
Rank	Team	Points
Gold medal	United Kingdom; Pallant; Gray; Emily Pidgeon; Sarah Waldron	47
Silver medal	Russia; Gorbunova; Vlasova; Lyudmila Lebedeva; Alfiya Khasanova	49
Bronze medal	Ukraine; Nosenko; Pohorielska; Olha Skrypak; Lyudmyla Kovalenko	65
4	Spain	94
5	Germany	107
6	Portugal	117
7	France	118
8	Poland	194

- Totals: 65 entrants, 64 starters, 61 finishers, 8 teams.

=== Junior men ===
Individual race
Rank	Athlete	Country	Time (m:s)
Gold medal	Abdelaziz Merzougui	Spain	18:07
Silver medal	Nemanja Cerovac	Serbia	18:07
Bronze medal	Rui Pinto	Portugal	18:09
4	Ivan Strebkov	Ukraine	18:09
5	Sondre Nordstad Moen	Norway	18:16
6	Andrey Rusakov	Russia	18:18
7	Jesper van der Wielen	Netherlands	18:19
8	Sándor Szábo	Hungary	18:23
9	Marek Kowalski	Poland	18:25
10	Ryan Saunders	United Kingdom	18:27
11	Romain Collenot-Spriet	France	18:31
12	Shane Quinn	Ireland	18:31

Team race
Rank	Team	Points
Gold medal	United Kingdom; Saunders; Jonathan Hay; John McDonnell; Andrew Combs	62
Silver medal	Portugal; Pinto; Emanuel Rolim; José Costa; Nuno Santos	74
Bronze medal	Russia; Rusakov; Victor Saenko; Ilgizar Safiulin; Nikolai Lialikov	85
4	France	88
5	Ireland	120
6	Ukraine	130
7	Spain	145
8	Belgium	155

- Totals: 104 entrants, 104 starters, 99 finishers, 17 teams.

=== Junior women ===
Individual race
Rank	Athlete	Country	Time (m:s)
Gold medal	Charlotte Purdue	United Kingdom	12:42
Silver medal	Amela Terzić	Serbia	12:59
Bronze medal	Emelia Gorecka	United Kingdom	13:00
4	Gulshat Fazlitdinova	Russia	13:03
5	Corrina Harrer	Germany	13:08
6	Zenobie Vangansbeke	Belgium	13:09
7	Ciara Mageean	Ireland	13:16
8	Ioana Doaga	Romania	13:18
9	Lily Partridge	United Kingdom	13:19
10	Annabel Gummow	United Kingdom	13:19
11	Gesa Krause	Germany	13:22
12	Kate Avery	United Kingdom	13:24

Team race
Rank	Team	Points
Gold medal	United Kingdom; Purdue; Gorecka; Partridge; Gummow	23
Silver medal	Germany; Harrer; Krause; Maya Rehberg; Jannika John	53
Bronze medal	Romania; Doaga; Mirela Lavric; Anca Maria Bunea; Dana Elena Login	64
4	Turkey	99
5	Belgium	103
6	Italy	128
7	Spain	149
8	Portugal	165

- Totals: 76 entrants, 75 starters, 74 finishers, 11 teams.

== Total medal table ==
Rank	Nation	Gold	Silver	Bronze	Total
1	Great Britain (GBR)	4	1	2	7
2	Portugal (POR)	2	2	3	7
3	France (FRA)	2	2	0	4
4	Spain (ESP)	1	2	3	6
5	Turkey (TUR)	1	1	0	2
6	Ukraine (UKR)	1	0	1	2
7	Ireland (IRL)	1	0	0	1
8	Serbia (SRB)	0	2	0	2
9	Russia (RUS)	0	1	2	3
10	Germany (GER)	0	1	0	1
11	Romania (ROU)	0	0	1	1
Totals (11 entries)		12	12	12	36

- Note: Totals include both individual and team medals, with medals in the team competition counting as one medal.
