= Morhad Amdouni =

French middle and long-distance runner

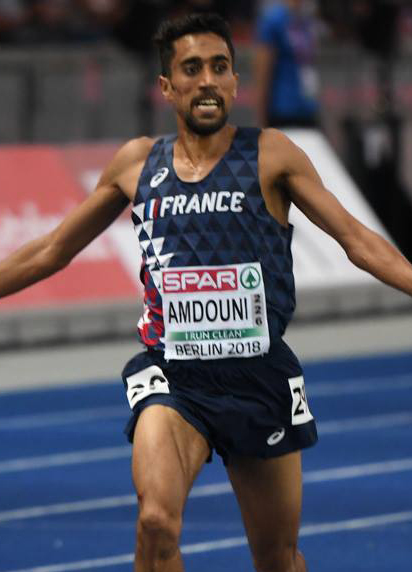
- Amdouni winning the 10,000 m at the 2018 European Championships

Personal information
- Born: 21 June 1988 (age 38) Porto-Vecchio, France
- Height: 175 cm (5 ft 9 in)
- Weight: 60 kg (132 lb)

Sport
- Country: France
- Sport: Athletics
- Events: 5000 metres 10,000 metres
- Coached by: Jean-Claude Vollmer
Medal record
Men's athletics
Representing France
European Championships
| Gold medal – first place | 2018 Berlin | 10,000 m |
| Bronze medal – third place | 2018 Berlin | 5000 m |
European Team Championships
| Gold medal – first place | 2015 Cheboksary | 5000 m |
European 10,000m Cup
| Silver medal – second place | 2018 London | 10,000 m |
European U20 Championships
| Gold medal – first place | 2007 Hengelo | 5000 m |
European Cross Country Championships
| Gold medal – first place | 2007 Toro | U20 race |
| Gold medal – first place | 2007 Toro | U20 team |
| Gold medal – first place | 2010 Albufeira | Team |
| Gold medal – first place | 2011 Velenje | Team |
| Gold medal – first place | 2022 Turin | Team |
| Silver medal – second place | 2015 Hyères | Team |
| Bronze medal – third place | 2006 San Giorgio su Legnano | U20 team |
| Bronze medal – third place | 2008 Brussels | U23 team |

Morhad Amdouni (Arabic: مراد عمدوني; born 21 June 1988) is a French middle- and long-distance runner. He won the gold medal in the 10,000 metres and bronze for the 5000 metres at the 2018 European Athletics Championships.

Amdouni was the European under-20 champion in track (5000 m) and cross country running in 2007. He is the French record holder for the marathon and won two national titles.

== Personal life ==
Born in France on the island of Corsica, Amdouni is of Tunisian descent.

== Running career ==
Amdouni made his junior international debut in the 1500 metres at the 2006 World Junior Championships in Athletics but did not progress past the heats. At the 2006 European Cross Country Championships he finished twelfth in the junior race, gaining the team bronze medal with France alongside Noureddine Smaïl. He made significant progress in the junior ranks the following year: first, he managed 38th place at the 2007 IAAF World Cross Country Championships and then he won the 5000 metres gold medal at the 2007 European Athletics Junior Championships. In the winter season, he went on to win the junior race at the 2007 European Cross Country Championships, leading the French juniors to victory along with runner-up Florian Carvalho.

In 2008, he stepped up an age category and competed in the under-23 competition of the 2008 European Cross Country Championships, where he finished in eighth and shared in the team bronze medal with France. He ran on the world senior stage for the first time the following year, taking 63rd at the 2009 IAAF World Cross Country Championships and being selected for the 2009 World Championships in Athletics. However, he did not make it into the final of the world men's 5000 metres at the latter competition. That season he set a European under-23 record in the 3000 metres, running at time of 7:37.50 at the Meeting Areva in July. He won his first senior medal at the 2010 European Cross Country Championships as he finished in fifth place behind compatriot Abdellatif Meftah to take the men's senior team title.

== Controversy ==
He made his debut appearance at the Olympics representing France at the 2020 Summer Olympics and competed in the men's marathon event, where he finished 17th. At the 28 km mark of the race, Amdouni was filmed knocking over a table's worth of water bottles before grasping the last bottle, denying bottles to competitors behind him, leading to criticisms of bad sportsmanship from observers. He later claimed that the bottles were wet and slippery, making them difficult to grasp.

== Legal Issues ==
Amdouni has faced severe legal issues outside the sport. In February 2025, he was convicted by a French court and sentenced to 10 months in prison with probation following domestic violence charges involving his wife.

=== Personal bests ===
- 800 metres – 1:47.20 (Padua 2015)
- 1500 metres – 3:34.05 (Monaco 2015)
- 3000 metres – 7:37.50 (Paris-Saint-Denis 2009)
  - 3000 metres indoor – 7:44.55 (Metz 2017)
- 5000 metres – 13:14.19 (Rabat 2009)
  - 5000 metres indoor – 13:11.18 (Birmingham 2017)
- 10,000 metres – 27:23.39 (Birmingham 2021)
- 20,000 metres – 57:50.25 (Lucciana 2020) NR
- One hour run – 20,772 m (Lucciana 2020) NR

Road

- 5 kilometres – 13:19 (Monaco 2021)
- 10 kilometres – 27:42 (Barcelona 2020)
- Half marathon – 59:40 (Gdynia 2020)
- Marathon – 2:03:47 (Seville 2024) NR

=== National titles ===
- French Athletics Championships
  - 1500 metres: 2015
  - 5000 metres: 2016
