= Serhiy Lebid =

Ukrainian long-distance runner

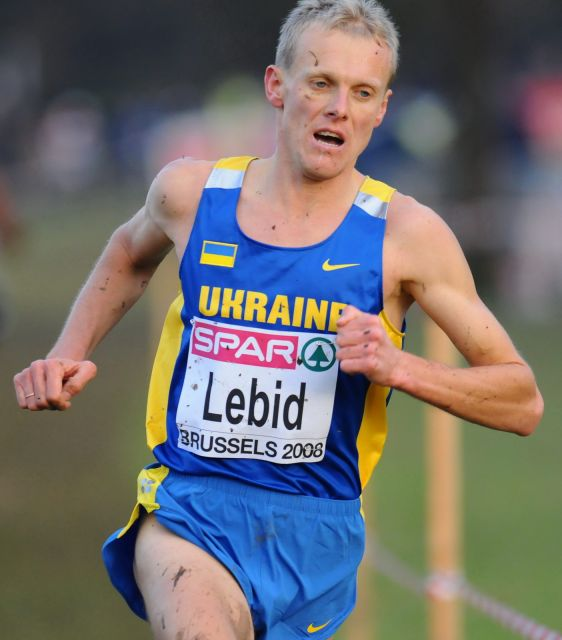
- Lebid at the European Cross Country Championships

Personal information
- Born: 15 July 1975 (age 51) Dnipropetrovsk, Soviet Union

Sport
- Sport: Track and field Cross country running
Medal record
Representing Ukraine
World Cross Country Championships
Silver medal – second place	2001 Ostend	Long race individual
European Championships
Bronze medal – third place	2002 Munich	5000 metres
Summer Universiade
Gold medal – first place	1999 Palma de Mallorca	5000 metres
Gold medal – first place	2001 Beijing	5000 metres
Gold medal – first place	2003 Daegu	5000 metres
European Cross Country Championships
Gold medal – first place	1998 Ferrara	Individual
Gold medal – first place	2001 Thun	Individual
Gold medal – first place	2002 Medulin	Individual
Gold medal – first place	2003 Edinburgh	Individual
Gold medal – first place	2004 Heringsdorf	Individual
Gold medal – first place	2005 Tilburg	Individual
Gold medal – first place	2007 Toro	Individual
Gold medal – first place	2008 Brussels	Individual
Gold medal – first place	2010 Albufeira	Individual
Silver medal – second place	2000 Malmö	Individual
Bronze medal – third place	1997 Oeiras	Individual
Bronze medal – third place	2005 Tilburg	Team
Bronze medal – third place	2009 Dublin	Individual
European Team Championships
Silver medal – second place	2011 Stockholm	5000 metres
Bronze medal – third place	2009 Leiria	5000 metres
Bronze medal – third place	2010 Bergen	5000 metres
European U23 Championships
Silver medal – second place	1997 Turku	10,000 metres

Serhiy Lebid or Serhii Lebid (Ukrainian: Сергій Лебідь; born 15 July 1975) is a Ukrainian long-distance runner.

== Career ==
He has won the European Cross Country championships on nine occasions, winning in 1998, 2001, 2002, 2003, 2004, 2005, 2007, 2008 and 2010.

Serhiy Lebid finished seventh in the 5,000 m at the 2000 Olympic Games, but did not qualify from his heat in the same event at the 2004 Olympics.

He won a bronze medal in the 5,000 m final at the 2002 European Athletics Championships in Munich and came fifth in the 10,000 m at the 2006 European Athletics Championships.

Lebid came second in ( Great Manchester Run) in 2008. third at the Great Manchester Run in May 2010. In October he was the best performing European at the Giro al Sas 10K in Trento as he finished third behind Edwin Soi and Wilson Busienei with a time of 28:48.3. He won his record ninth title in the men's race at the 2010 European Cross Country Championships, taking the lead in the final stages after a moderately paced start. This also extended his appearance record at the championships – he is the only athlete to have competed every year since the championships' creation in 1994. He secured a second career win at the Lotto Cross Cup Brussels later that month, holding off the Kenyan challengers. A fourth-place finish at the Great Edinburgh Cross Country in January helped the Europeans to the team title, and he was the first European home at the Cross Internacional de San Sebastián with a third-place finish.

He returned to the Manchester 10K in May 2011 and came third behind Haile Gebrselassie and Chris Thompson.

Serhiy Lebid won the 2014 Nagano Marathon (2:13:56). He took 10th place in the 2015 London Marathon with a time of 2:10:21.
