= Antonio Abadía =

Spanish long-distance runner

Personal information
- Born: 2 July 1990 (age 36) Zaragoza, Spain
- Height: 1.79 m (5 ft 10 in)
- Weight: 65 kg (143 lb)

Sport
- Sport: Track and field
- Event: 5000m
- Club: CD Nike Running
Medal record
European Championships
Bronze medal – third place	2016 Amsterdam	10,000 m

Antonio Abadía Beci (born 2 July 1990) is a Spanish long-distance runner. He competed in the 5000 metres at the 2016 Summer Olympics without qualifying for the final.

== Competition record ==
Year	Competition	Venue	Position	Event	Notes
Representing Spain
2007	European Youth Olympic Festival	Belgrade, Serbia	3rd	2000 m s'chase	5:54.92
2009	European Junior Championships	Novi Sad, Serbia	1st	3000 m s'chase	8:47.45
2010	Ibero-American Championships	San Fernando, Spain	9th	5000 m	14:26.31
2011	European U23 Championships	Ostrava, Czech Republic	4th	3000 m s'chase	8:41.82
2011	Universiade	Shenzhen, China	20th (h)	5000 m	14:46.31
2014	World Indoor Championships	Sopot, Poland	13th (h)	3000 m	7:46.36
2014	European Championships	Zürich, Switzerland	8th	5000 m	14:11.89
2016	European Championships	Amsterdam, Netherlands	3rd	10,000 m	28:26.07
2016	Olympic Games	Rio de Janeiro, Brazil	44th (h)	5000 m	14:33.20
2018	Mediterranean Games	Tarragona, Spain	4th	5000 m	13:56.74
2018	European Championships	Berlin, Germany	13th	5000 m	13:34.25

== Personal bests ==
Outdoor

- 1500 metres – 3:37.24 (Huelva 2016)
- 3000 metres – 7:48.14 (London 2017)
- 5000 metres – 13:12.68 (Hengelo 2016)
- 10,000 metres – 28:07.14 (Maia 2016)
- 10 kilometres - 27:47 (Laredo 2018)
- 3000 metres steeplechase – 8:34.75 (Ostrava 2011)

Indoor

- 3000 metres – 7:46.36 (Sopot 2014)
