= French Cross Country Championships =

Annual cross country running race

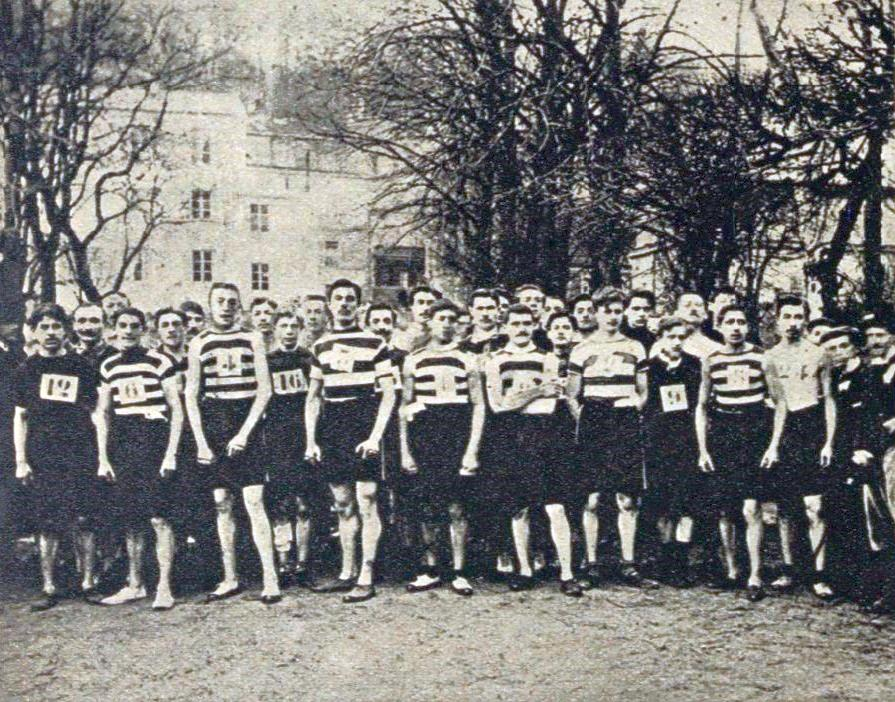
- The start of the 1900 championships (winner Albert Champoudry wearing #4).
- Date: Late-February/Early-March
- Location: France
- Event type: Cross country running
- Distance: 12 km for men 8 km for women
- Established: 1889
- Website: FFA

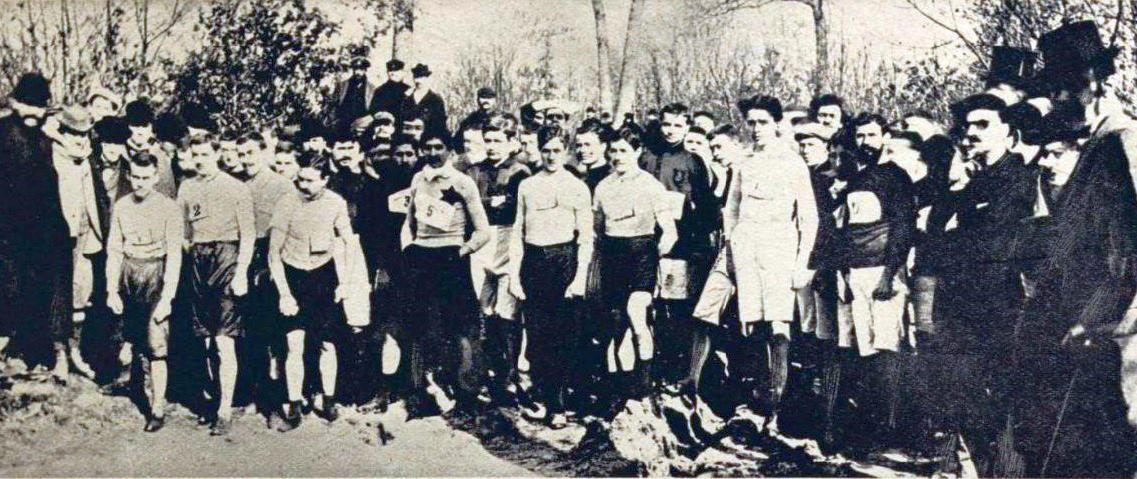
Start of the 1896 French Cross Country Championships

The French Cross Country Championships is the annual national championships for cross country running in France. The championships is generally held in late-February or early-March. Organised by the French Athletics Federation (FFA), it serves as a way of designating the country's national champion, as well as acting as the selection race for the IAAF World Cross Country Championships. First established in 1889, the competition has held over 125 editions. The women's race was first held in 1918.

The most successful athletes of the competition each have eight victories to their name: Driss El Himer in the men's section and Joëlle De Brouwer in the women's. Noël Tijou and Annette Sergent are the next most successful with seven wins.

== Editions ==
Year	Venue
1889	Bellevue - Chaville - Ville d'Avray (Hauts-de-Seine)
1890	Bellevue - Chaville - Ville d'Avray (Hauts-de-Seine)
1891	Ville d'Avray (Hauts-de-Seine)
1892	Garches (Hauts-de-Seine)
1893	Parc de Saint-Cloud (Hauts-de-Seine)
1894	Chaville (Hauts-de-Seine)
1895	Ville d'Avray (Hauts-de-Seine)
1896	Ville d'Avray (Hauts-de-Seine)
1897	Ville d'Avray (Hauts-de-Seine)
1898	Ville d'Avray (Hauts-de-Seine)
1899	Ville d'Avray (Hauts-de-Seine)
1900	Ville d'Avray (Hauts-de-Seine)
1901	Parc de Saint-Cloud (Hauts-de-Seine)
1902	Parc de Saint-Cloud (Hauts-de-Seine)
1903	Parc de Saint-Cloud (Hauts-de-Seine)
1904	Parc de Saint-Cloud (Hauts-de-Seine)
1905	Hippodrome de la Marche, Vaucresson (Hauts-de-Seine)
1906	Meudon (Hauts-de-Seine)
1907	Meudon (Hauts-de-Seine)
1908	Colombes (Hauts-de-Seine)
1909	Amiens (Picardie)
1910	Marseille (Bouches-du-Rhône)
1911	Hippodrome de la Marche, Vaucresson (Hauts-de-Seine)
1912	Le Mans (Sarthe)
1913	Langon (Gironde)
1914	Juvisy-sur-Orge (Essonne)
1918	Meudon (Hauts-de-Seine) ♀ Parc de Saint-Cloud (Hauts-de-Seine) ♂
1919	Parc de Saint-Cloud (Hauts-de-Seine) ♀ et ♂
1920	Antony (Hauts-de-Seine) ♀ Bry-sur-Marne (Val-de-Marne) ♂
1921	Pershing, Paris ♀ La Courneuve (Seine-Saint-Denis) ♂
1922	Chaville (Hauts-de-Seine) ♀ La Courneuve (Seine-Saint-Denis) ♂
1923	Parc de Saint-Cloud (Hauts-de-Seine) ♀ La Courneuve (Seine-Saint-Denis) ♂
1924	Hippodrome de Maisons-Laffitte, Maisons-Laffitte (Yvelines) ♂ Parc de Saint-Cloud (Hauts-de-Seine) ♀
1925	Hippodrome de Maisons-Laffitte, Maisons-Laffitte (Yvelines) ♂ Parc de Saint-Cloud (Hauts-de-Seine) ♀
1926	Hippodrome de Maisons-Laffitte, Maisons-Laffitte (Yvelines) ♂ Meudon (Hauts-de-Seine) ♀
1927	Hippodrome de Maisons-Laffitte, Maisons-Laffitte (Yvelines) ♂ Parc de Saint-Cloud (Hauts-de-Seine) ♀
1928	Hippodrome de Vincennes (Paris) ♂ Parc de Saint-Cloud (Hauts-de-Seine) ♀
1929	Hippodrome de Maisons-Laffitte, Maisons-Laffitte (Yvelines) ♂ Parc de Saint-Cloud (Hauts-de-Seine) ♀
1930	Hippodrome de Maisons-Laffitte, Maisons-Laffitte (Yvelines) ♂ Pershing, Paris ♀
1931	Hippodrome de Maisons-Laffitte, Maisons-Laffitte (Yvelines) ♂ Ville d'Avray (Hauts-de-Seine) ♀
1932	Hippodrome de Maisons-Laffitte, Maisons-Laffitte (Yvelines) ♂ Ville d'Avray (Hauts-de-Seine) ♀
1933	Hippodrome de Maisons-Laffitte, Maisons-Laffitte (Yvelines) ♂ Ville d'Avray (Hauts-de-Seine) ♀
1934	Hippodrome d'Enghien (Val-d'Oise) ♂ Ville d'Avray (Hauts-de-Seine) ♀
1935	Hippodrome de Maisons-Laffitte, Maisons-Laffitte (Yvelines) ♂ Ville d'Avray (Hauts-de-Seine) ♀
1936	Champ de courses du Tremblay, Champigny-sur-Marne (Val-de-Marne) ♂ Parc de Saint-Cloud (Hauts-de-Seine) ♀
1937	Parc de Saint-Cloud (Hauts-de-Seine) ♀ Hippodrome d'Enghien-les-Bains (Val-d'Oise) ♂
1938	Joinville (Val-de-Marne)♀ Marcq-en-Barœul (Nord) ♂
1939	Hippodrome de Maisons-Laffitte, Maisons-Laffitte (Yvelines)
1940	Chartres (Eure-et-Loir) ♂ Croix-Catelan (Paris) ♀
1941	Zone occupée : Hippodrome de Vincennes (Paris) ♂ et ♀ Zone libre : Hippodrome du Grand Camp, Lyon (Rhône)♂
1942	Hippodrome de Vincennes (Paris)
1943	Hippodrome de Vincennes (Paris)
1944	Hippodrome de Vincennes (Paris)
1945	Hippodrome de Saint-Cloud (Hauts-de-Seine)
1946	Hippodrome de Saint-Cloud (Hauts-de-Seine)
1947	Limoges-Feytiat (Haute-Vienne)
1948	Hippodrome de Saint-Cloud (Hauts-de-Seine)
1949	Hippodrome de Saint-Cloud (Hauts-de-Seine)
1950	Hippodrome de Saint-Cloud (Hauts-de-Seine)
1951	Hippodrome de Vincennes (Paris)
1952	Hippodrome de Vincennes (Paris)
1953	Hippodrome de Vincennes (Paris)
1954	Hippodrome de Vincennes (Paris)
1955	Hippodrome de la Prairie, Caen (Calvados)
1956	Hippodrome du Petit Port, Nantes (Loire-Atlantique)
1957	Hippodrome du Croisé-Laroche, Marcq-en-Barœul (Nord)
1958	Hippodrome du Tremblay, Champigny-sur-Marne (Val-de-Marne)
1959	Hippodrome du Tremblay, Champigny-sur-Marne (Val-de-Marne)
1960	Aix-les-Bains (Savoie)
1961	Hippodrome du Tremblay, Champigny-sur-Marne (Val-de-Marne)
1962	Hippodrome du Tremblay, Champigny-sur-Marne (Val-de-Marne)
1963	Champ de courses du Tremblay, Champigny-sur-Marne (Val-de-Marne)
1964	Champ de courses du Tremblay, Champigny-sur-Marne (Val-de-Marne) ♀ Montluçon (Allier) ♂
1965	Champ de courses du Tremblay, Champigny-sur-Marne (Val-de-Marne) ♀ Aix en Provence (Bouches-du-Rhône) ♂
1966	Champ de courses du Tremblay, Champigny-sur-Marne (Val-de-Marne) ♀ Chartres (Eure-et-Loir) ♂
1967	Montgeron (Essonne) ♀ Orange - Saint Eutrope d'Orange (Vaucluse) ♂
1968	Montgeron (Essonne) ♀ Pontivy (Morbihan) ♂
1969	Montgeron (Essonne) ♀ Argentan (Orne) ♂
1970	Vichy (Allier) ♀ Hippodrome d'Éventard, Angers (Maine-et-Loire) ♂
1971	Montgeron (Essonne) ♀ Aire-sur-l'Adour (Landes) ♂
1972	Vittel (Vosges)
1973	Angers (Maine-et-Loire)
1974	Le Touquet (Pas-de-Calais)
1975	Chartres (Eure-et-Loir)
1976	Mézidon-Canon (Calvados)
1977	Fontainebleau (Seine-et-Marne)
1978	Le Touquet (Pas-de-Calais)
1979	Aix-les-Bains (Savoie)
1980	Vichy (Allier)
1981	La Grande-Motte (Hérault)
1982	Nancy (Meurthe-et-Moselle)
1983	Chartres (Eure-et-Loir)
1984	Le Touquet (Pas-de-Calais)
1985	Créteil (Val-de-Marne)
1986	Angers (Maine-et-Loire)
1987	Rennes (Ille-et-Vilaine)
1988	Salon de Provence (Bouches-du-Rhône)
1989	Coudekerque (Nord)
1990	Aix-les-Bains (Savoie)
1991	Laval (Mayenne)
1992	Brumath (Bas-Rhin)
1993	Marignane (Bouches-du-Rhône)
1994	Vittel (Vosges)
1995	Castres (Tarn)
1996	Carhaix-Plouguer (Finistère)
1997	La Courneuve (Seine-Saint-Denis)
1998	Chartres (Eure-et-Loir)
1999	Hippodrome du Petit Port, Nantes (Loire-Atlantique)
2000	Carhaix-Plouguer (Finistère)
2001	Grande-Synthe (Nord)
2002	Gujan Mestras (Gironde)
2003	Salon de Provence (Bouches-du-Rhône)
2004	Saint Quentin en Yvelines (Yvelines)
2005	Roullet-Saint-Estèphe (Charente)
2006	Challans (Vendée)
2007	Vichy (Allier)
2008	Laval (Mayenne)
2009	Aix-les-Bains (Savoie)
2010	La Roche-sur-Yon (Vendée)
2011	Paray-le-Monial (Saône-et-Loire)
2012	La Roche-sur-Yon (Vendée)
2013	Lignières (Cher)
2014	Le Pontet (Vaucluse)
2015	Les Mureaux (Yvelines)
2016	Le Mans (Sarthe)
2017	Saint-Galmier (Loire)
2018	Plouay (Morbihan)
2019	Vittel (Vosges)

== Winners ==
=== Men ===
==== Long course ====
Games	Gold	Silver	Bronze
1889	Mat Bersin	Bellone	
1890	Frantz Reichel	Maurice Dezaux	Baudin
1891	Frantz Reichel	Cornetet	Maurice Dezaux
1892	Joseph Petit	Fernand Meiers	Louis Lucien Faure-Dujarric
1893	Albert Chauvelot	De Rocquigny	Fernand Meiers
1894	Félix Bourdier	Cheruy	Jacques Chastanié
1895	Albin Lermusiaux	Turlot	Michel Soalhat
1896	Michel Soalhat	Albin Lermusiaux	Félix Bourdier
1897	Michel Soalhat	Joseph Genet	De Grave
1898	Alfred Tunmer (GBR)	Georges Daunis-Touquet	C. Pican
1899	Georges Daunis-Touquet	Albert Champoudry	Marlins
1900	Albert Champoudry	Henri Deloge	Charles Aubry
1901	Gaston Ragueneau	Michel Théato	Henri Deloge
1902	Gaston Ragueneau	Henri Prevot	Louis Bonniot de Fleurac
1903	Gaston Ragueneau	Louis Bonniot	Eugène Gautier
1904	Gaston Ragueneau	Jacques Versel	Louis Bouchard
1905	Gaston Ragueneau	Louis Bouchard	Victor Millerot
1906	Gaston Ragueneau	Louis Bouchard	Georges Cousin
1907	Jacques Keyser (NED)	Gaston Ragueneau	Jean Bouin
1908	Jacques Keyser	Alexandre Fayollat	Gaston Ragueneau
1909	Jean Bouin	Jacques Keyser	Jacques Versel
1910	Jean Bouin	Edgard Ballon	Louis Pauteix
1911	Jean Bouin	Edgard Ballon	Jacques Keyser
1912	Jean Bouin	Jacques Keyser	Paul Lisandier
1913	Jacques Keyser	Allemamen Arbidi	Ali Ben Allel
1914	Jacques Keyser	Alfred Bonvicini	L. Pouzette
1918	Jacques Keyser		
1919	Jean Vermeulen	Julien Schnellmann (SUI)	Jacques Keyser
1920	Joseph Guillemot	René Vignaud	Louis Corlet
1921	Louis Corlet	Lucien Duquesne	René Vignaud
1922	Joseph Guillemot	Lucien Duquesne	Louis Corlet
1923	Alim Amar Arbidi	Gaston Heuet	Emile Gaudé
1924	Ernest Bedel	Emile Gaudé	Maurice Norland
1925	Lucien Dolquès	Robert Marchal	Joseph Guillemot
1926	Joseph Guillemot	Robert Marchal	Ernest Bedel
1927	Seghir Beddari	Henri Gallet	Georges Leclerc
1928	Roger Pelé	Georges Leclerc	Georges Boué
1929	Seghir Beddari	Georges Boué	Roger Rérolle
1930	Roger Rérolle	Georges Boué	Pierre Louchard
1931	Roger Rérolle	Louis Auvray	Henri Lahitte
1932	Georges Leclerc	Henri Lahitte	Roger Vigneron
1933	Roger Rérolle	Paul Lallemend	Henri Lahitte
1934	Roger Rérolle	Roger Rochard	Robert Arnold
1935	André Angeard	Charles Poharec	Fernand Le Heurteur
1936	Ben Kassen Bouali	Maurice Baudouin	Joseph Guiomar
1937	Mohamed Ben Larbi	André Lonlas	André Sicard
1938	Jean Lalanne	André Sicard	Jean Wattiau
1939	Jean Lalanne	Gaston Letisserand	Mohamed El Ghazi
1940	Emile Manaire	Jean Wattiau	Daniels (GBR)
1941	Jean Lalanne	Salem Amrouche	Raymond Morlet
1942	Jean Lalanne	Maurice Baudouin	Braillon
1943	Jean Lalanne	René Leygues	Papouin
1944	Raphaël Pujazon	Jean Gallet	Jean Lalanne
1945	Raphaël Pujazon	Ernest Petitjean	Jean Capelle
1946	Raphaël Pujazon	Paul Messner	Edmond Capel
1947	Raphaël Pujazon	Paul Messner	Mohamed Lahoucine
1948	Raphaël Pujazon	Mohamed Lahoucine	Charles Cerou
1949	Raphaël Pujazon	Jacques Vernier	Alain Mimoun
1950	Alain Mimoun	Hamza Moha	Charles Cerou
1951	Alain Mimoun	Mohamed Lahoucine	Lionel Billas
1952	Alain Mimoun	Ali Ou Bassou	Julien Soucours
1953	Ould Lamine Abdallah	Pierre Prat	Ahmed Abd El Krim
1954	Alain Mimoun	Pierre Prat	Boualem Labadi
1955	Mohamed Ben Saïd	Bakir Benaïssa	Lahcen Ben Allal
1956	Alain Mimoun	Amar Khallouf	Hamida Addeche
1957	Bakir Benaïssa	Maurice Chiclet	Salah Beddiaf
1958	Michel Bernard	Alain Mimoun	Abdesselem Ben Rhadi
1959	Alain Mimoun	Abdesselem Ben Rhadi	Salah Beddiaf
1960	Rhadi Ben Abdesselam	Michel Bernard	Hamoud Ameur
1961	Michel Bernard	Hamida Addeche	Robert Bogey
1962	Michel Jazy	Robert Bogey	Jean Vaillant
1963	Roger Bogey	Hamoud Ameur	Yves Martinage
1964	Jean Fayolle	Guy Texereau	Yves Martinage
1965	Michel Jazy	Jean Fayolle	Bernard Maroquin
1966	Michel Jazy	Guy Texereau	Jean Fayolle
1967	Noël Tijou	Guy Texereau	Gilbert Gauthier
1968	Jean Wadoux	Guy Texereau	Bernard Maroquin
1969	Noël Tijou	René Jourdan	Henri Lepape
1970	Noël Tijou	René Jourdan	Lucien Rault
1971	Noël Tijou	Lucien Rault	Antoine Borowski
1972	Jean Wadoux	Noël Tijou	Lucien Rault
1973	Noël Tijou	Pierre Liardet	René Jourdan
1974	Lucien Rault	Noël Tijou	Jean-Jacques Boiroux
1975	Noël Tijou	Pierre Liardet	Jean Conrath
1976	Jacques Boxberger	Jean-Paul Gomez	Pierre Lévisse
1977	Noël Tijou	Jean-Luc Paugam	Pierre Lévisse
1978	Dominique Coux	Jean-Luc Paugam	Pierre Lévisse
1979	Pierre Lévisse	Jean-Luc Paugam	Radhouane Bouster
1980	Dominique Coux	Thierry Watrice	Alexandre Gonzalez
1981	Alexandre Gonzalez	Francis Gonzalez	Pierre Lévisse
1982	Thierry Watrice	Pierre Lévisse	Jacques Boxberger
1983	Jacques Boxberger	Pierre Lévisse	Christian Geffray
1984	Pierre Lévisse	Thierry Watrice	Dominique Chauvelier
1985	Pierre Lévisse	Paul Arpin	Jean-Louis Prianon
1986	Pierre Lévisse	Thierry Watrice	Paul Arpin
1987	Paul Arpin	Thierry Pantel	Pierre Lévisse
1988	Paul Arpin	Joël Lucas	Cyril Laventure
1989	Paul Arpin	Pierre Lévisse	Bruno Levant
1990	Thierry Pantel	Paul Arpin	Bertrand Itsweire
1991	Bruno Le Stum	Pierre Lévisse	Tony Martins
1992	Antonio Rapisarda	Bruno Le Stum	Tony Martins
1993	Abdellah Béhar	Tony Martins	Mustapha Essaïd
1994	Mustapha Essaïd	Bertrand Fréchard	Bruno Le Stum
1995	Bertrand Fréchard	Thierry Pantel	Mustapha Essaïd
1996	Mustapha Essaïd	Bruno Le Stum	Yann Millon
1997	Abdellah Béhar	Mohamed Ezzher	Jean-Pierre Lautredoux
1998	Driss El Himer	Abdellah Béhar	Benoît Zwierzchiewski
1999	Driss El Himer	Mustapha Essaïd	Abdellah Béhar
2000	Abdellah Béhar	El Hassan Lahssini	Mohamed Ezzher
2001	Driss El Himer	Mustapha El Ahmadi	Mickaël Thomas
2002	Mustapha Essaïd	El Hassan Lahssini	Khalid Zoubaa
2003	Driss El Himer	Ismaïl Sghyr	Abdellah Béhar
2004	El Hassan Lahssini	Khalid Zoubaa	Augusto Gomes
2005	Driss El Himer	Bouabdellah Tahri	Abdellah Béhar
2006	Khalid Zoubaa	James Theuri	Mustapha El Ahmadi
2007	Driss El Himer	Simon Munyutu	James Theuri
2008	Mokhtar Benhari	Cédric Pelissier	Larbi Zéroual
2009	Driss El Himer	Ahmed Ezzobayry	Bouabdellah Tahri
2010	Driss El Himer	Abdellatif Meftah	Hassan Hirt
2011	Morhad Amdouni	Hassan Chahdi	Hassan Hirt
2012	Benjamin Malaty	Mohamed Khaled Belabbas	Denis Mayaud
2013	Yassine Mandour	Mohamed Khaled Belabbas	Benjamin Malaty
2014	El Hassane Ben Khainouch	Abdellatif Meftah	James Theuri
2015	Hassan Chahdi	Abdellatif Meftah	El Hassane Ben Khainouch
2016	Hassan Chahdi	Vincent Luis	Morhad Amdouni
2017	Hassan Chahdi	Michael Gras	Emmanuel Roudolff-Levisse
2018	Morhad Amdouni	Hassan Hirt	Yoann Kowal
2019	Emmanuel Roudolff-Levisse	Michael Gras	Jimmy Gressier
2021	Yann Schrub		
2022	Morhad Amdouni		
2023	Jimmy Gressier		
2024	Michael Gras		
2025	Félix Bour		
2026	Félix Bour		

==== Short course ====
Games	Gold	Silver	Bronze
1998	Driss Maazouzi	Éric Dubus	Saïd Chebili
1999	Driss Maazouzi	Fabrice Belot	Stéphane Desaulty
2000	Driss Maazouzi	Cédric Andres	Samir Benfarès
2001	Lyes Ramoul	Badre Din Zioini	Samir Benfarès
2002	Driss Maazouzi	Fouad Chouki	Stéphane Desaulty
2003	Rachid Chékhémani	Alexis Abraham	Irba Lakhal
2004	Alexis Abraham	Benoît Nicolas	Mokhtar Benhari
2005	Mokhtar Benhari	Gaël Pencreach	Rachid Chékhémani
2006	Moussa Barkaoui	Sébastien Cosson	Badre Dine Zioni
2007	Mohamed Khaled Belabbas	Abderazak Zbairi	Laurent Caranton
2008	Driss Maazouzi	Abdelhakim Zilali	Mustapha Essaïd
2009	Yoann Kowal	Frédéric Denis	Florian Carvalho
2010	Noureddine Smaïl	Olivier Galon	Florian Carvalho
2011	Noureddine Smaïl	Mehdi Akaouch	Matthieu Le Stum
2012	Noureddine Smaïl	Romain Collenot-Spriet	Tanguy Pépiot
2013	Romain Collenot-Spriet	Yohan Durand	Ahmat Abdou-Daoud
2014	Florian Carvalho	Valentin Pépiot	David Vuste
2015	Benjamin Choquert	Romain Collenot-Spriet	Alexandre Saddedine
2016	Bryan Cantero	Djilali Bedrani	James Theuri
2017	Mohamed Amine El Bouajaji	Félix Bour	Romain Collenot-Spriet
2018	Djilali Bedrani	Quentin Mercuri	Yani Khelaf
2019	Djilali Bedrani	Alexis Miellet	Yann Schrub

=== Women ===
==== Long course ====
Games	Gold	Silver	Bronze
1918	Y. de Tinguy	Lucienne Landré	
1919	Lucie Cadiès		
1920	Lucie Bréard		
1921	Lucie Bréard		
1922	Marcelle Neveu		
1923	Marcelle Neveu		
1924	Marcelle Neveu		
1925	Suzanne Thuault	Mullebrouck	
1926	Suzanne Thuault		
1927	Ginette Jolly		
1928	Sébastienne Guyot		
1929	Renée Trente-Ganault		
1930	Lucienne Tostain		
1931	Suzanne Lenoir		
1932	Renée Hedoin		
1933	Renée Amaridon		
1934	Suzanne Lenoir		
1935	Suzanne Lenoir		
1936	Ruth Christmas-Paysant (GBR)		
1937	Suzanne Lenoir		
1938	Lily Loth		
1939	Hélène Devez-Fize		
1940	Raymonde Turpin		
1941	Renée Trente-Ganault		
1942	Renée Trente-Ganault		
1943	Paulette Delepine		
1944	Paulette Delepine		
1945	Hélène Devez-Fize		
1946	Paulette Delepine		
1947	Simone Jossaud		
1948	Simone Legoupil		
1949	Clémentine Branchard		
1950	Monique Carron-Renout		
1951	Josiane Fournier		
1952	Monique Carron-Renout		
1953	Monique Carron-Renout		
1954	Simone Cathiard		
1955	Simone Racoussot		
1956	Nicole Goullieux		
1957	Alcette Leysenne		
1958	Lucette Desport ép. Tholon	Josette Oddou	Barbari
1959	Nicole Goullieux	Barbari	Lydie Yvonnet ép. Courpotin
1960	Nicole Goullieux	Josette Oddou	Lydie Courpotin
1961	Nicole Goullieux	Lydie Courpotin	Josette Oddou
1962	Lydie Courpotin	Nicole Goullieux	Mutel
1963	Nicole Goullieux	Yvonne Hérisson	Josette Blanchard née Oddou
1964	Yvonne Hérisson	Nicole Goullieux	Lydie Courpotin
1965	Yvonne Hérisson	Lydie Yvonnet	Eliane Rieuf
1966	Yvonne Hérisson	Eliane Rieuf	Eliane Camacaris
1967	Yvonne Hérisson	Yolande Touron	Eliane Camacaris
1968	Yvonne Hérisson	Eliane Camacaris	Eliane Rieuf
1969	Eliane Camacaris	Yvonne Hérisson	Claudette Brouard
1970	Claudette Brouard	Nicole Chassagneux ép. Auliac	Catherine Michaud ép. Bultez
1971	Colette Besson	Yvonne Hérisson	Monique Baulu ép. Authier
1972	Marie-José Phyllis	Nicole Auliac	Colette Besson
1973	Joëlle Audibert	Yolande Touron ép. Roche	
1974	Joëlle Audibert		
1975	Joëlle De Brouwer		
1976	Joëlle De Brouwer		
1977	Joëlle De Brouwer		
1978	Joëlle De Brouwer		
1979	Joëlle De Brouwer		
1980	Martine Bouchonneau		
1981	Joëlle De Brouwer		
1982	Jacqueline Lefeuvre		
1983	Joëlle De Brouwer		
1984	Joëlle De Brouwer		
1985	Annette Sergent		
1986	Annette Sergent		
1987	Annette Sergent		
1988	Annette Sergent		
1989	Annette Sergent		
1990	Farida Fatès	Odile Ohier	Annette Sergent
1991	Marie-Pierre Duros	Farida Fatès	Odile Ohier
1992	Annette Sergent	Zohra Graziani-Koullou	Marie-Pierre Duros
1993	Odile Ohier	Farida Fatès	Annette Sergent
1994	Maria Rebelo	Odile Ohier	Farida Fatès
1995	Annette Sergent	Blandine Bitzner	Rosario Murcia-Gangloff
1996	Farida Fatès	Odile Ohier	Annette Sergent
1997	Farida Fatès	Laurence Vivier	Laurence Duquenoy
1998	Blandine Bitzner	Chantal Dällenbach	Zahia Dahmani
1999	Blandine Bitzner	Chantal Dällenbach	Fatima Yvelain
2000	Rakiya Maraoui-Quétier	Fatima Yvelain	Fatima Hajjami
2001	Rakiya Maraoui-Quétier	Zahia Dahmani	Chantal Dällenbach
2002	Rodica Daniela Moroianu	Fatima Yvelain	Carmen Oliveras
2003	Laurence Duquenoy	Margaret Maury	Nathalie Chabran
2004	Margaret Maury	Fatima Yvelain	Zahia Dahmani
2005	Maria Martins	Rodica Daniela Moroianu	Fatima Yvelain
2006	Julie Coulaud	Hanan Farhoun	Zahia Dahmani
2007	Christelle Daunay	Julie Coulaud	Carmen Oliveras
2008	Saadia Bourgailh-Haddioui	Christine Bardelle	Christelle Daunay
2009	Christelle Daunay	Élodie Olivarès	Fatiha Klilech-Fauvel
2010	Fatima Yvelain	Christine Bardelle	Sandra Levenez
2011	Christelle Daunay	Christine Bardelle	Sophie Duarte
2012	Laurane Picoche	Christine Bardelle	Sophie Duarte
2013	Clémence Calvin	Christelle Daunay	Sophie Duarte
2014	Laila Traby	Sophie Duarte	Christelle Daunay
2015	Sophie Duarte	Aurore Guérin	Karine Pasquier
2016	Clémence Calvin	Jacqueline Gandar	Sophie Duarte
2017	Christelle Daunay	Sophie Duarte	Claire Perraux
2018	Sophie Duarte	Léonie Périault	Clémence Calvin
2019	Liv Westphal	Mathilde Sénéchal	Marie Bouchard

==== Short course ====
Games	Gold	Silver	Bronze
1998	Rodica Daniela Nagel	Stéphanie Berthevas	Marie-Christine Dampa
1999	Céline Rajot	Laurence Duquenoy	Marie-Christine Dampa
2000	Yamna Belkacem	Laurence Duquenoy	Marie-Noëlle Jacquet
2001	Fatima Yvelain	Yamna Belkacem	Bouchra M'Darra-Halafou
2002	Élodie Olivarès	Latifa Essarokh	Julie Coulaud
2003	Élodie Olivarès	Christine Bardelle	Bouchra M'Darra-Halafou
2004	Yamna Oubouhou	Élodie Olivarès	Julie Coulaud
2005	Bouchra Ghezielle	Latifa Essarokh	Julie Coulaud
2006	Élodie Olivarès	Yamina Bouchaouante	Carmen Oliveras
2007	Marie-Noëlle Jacquet	Manuella Benavente	Dalila Idir
2008	Élodie Mouthon	Claire Navez	Jennifer Lozano
2009	Marie-Noëlle Jacquet	Jennifer Lozano	Fanjanteino Félix
2010	Laura Miclo	Jennifer Lozano	Latifa Essarokh
2011	Claire Navez	Jennifer Lozano	Sophie Gazzola
2012	Claire Navez	Fanjanteino Félix	Latifa Essarokh
2013	Claire Perraux	Alice Rocquain	Laura Miclo
2014	Clémence Calvin	Laura Miclo	Jennifer Lozano
2015	Claire Perraux	Alice Rocquain	Élodie Normand
2016	Johanna Geyer-Carles	Aïssé Sow	Claire Perraux
2017	Élodie Normand	Aïssé Sow	Johanna Geyer-Carles
2018	Claire Perraux	Johanna Geyer-Carles	Élodie Normand
2019	Claire Perraux	Johanna Geyer-Carles	Élodie Normand
