= Julie Coulaud =

French athletics competitor

Medal record

Women's athletics

Representing France

European Cross Country Championships
Silver medal – second place	2007 Toro	Senior race

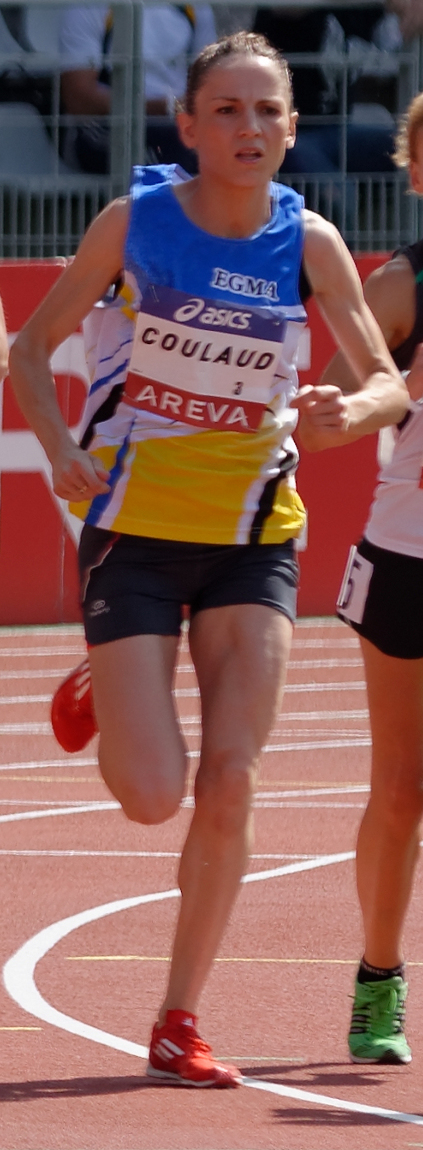
Final of the women's 1500-metre race during the French Athletics Championships 2013 at Stade Charléty in Paris, 13 July 2013

Julie Coulaud (born 7 August 1982) is a French former middle- and long-distance runner. She had most of her success in cross country running, with her career highlight being a silver medal at the 2007 European Cross Country Championships. She was a team bronze medallist at that competition in 2006 and was runner-up at the European Champion Clubs Cup Cross Country and World Military Cross Country Championships that same year.

Coulaud made four appearances at the IAAF World Cross Country Championships and represented France at the 2007 World Championships in Athletics, running in the 3000 metres steeplechase. She was briefly the French record holder in the latter event, with marks of 9:32:08 minutes then 9:31:43 minutes in June and July 2007. Sophie Duarte improved that time later in July that year.

After a positive doping test for excess testosterone and traces of anabolic substances in February 2008 she received a three-year ban from the sport.

Following her athletics ban, she received a suspended jail sentence of six months and a fine of €2000 for possession of restricted substances, after her cache of EPO, growth hormones and insulin was found. She responded to the court that she had obtained the substances through a Spanish doctor in Valencia. Coulaud retired from the sport internationally and focused on opening a clothes business.

Julie is the sister of Aurélie Coulaud, another well known French middle-distance runner .

== International competitions ==
Year	Competition	Venue	Position	Event	Notes
1999	European Cross Country Championships	Velenje, Slovenia	40th	Junior race	13:53
2000	World Junior Championships	Santiago, Chile	11th (heats)	1500 m	4:32.57
2000	European Cross Country Championships	Malmö, Sweden	20th	Junior race	13:29
2001	World Cross Country Championships	Ostend, Belgium	44th	Junior race	24:16
2001	World Cross Country Championships	Ostend, Belgium	13th	Junior team	235 pts
2001	European Cross Country Championships	Thun, Switzerland	9th	Junior race	11:11
2001	European Cross Country Championships	Thun, Switzerland	5th	Junior team	115 pts
2003	European U23 Championships	Bydgoszcz, Poland	10th	1500 m	4:18.09
2004	World Cross Country Championships	Brussels, Belgium	78th	Short race	14:59
2005	World Cross Country Championships	Saint-Galmier, France	42nd	Short race	14:30
2005	World Cross Country Championships	Saint-Galmier, France	8th	Short team	182 pts
2005	Mediterranean Games	Almería, Spain	11th	1500 m	4:16.60
2005	European Cross Country Championships	Tilburg, Netherlands	27th	Senior race	20:42
2006	European Champion Clubs Cup Cross Country	Cáceres, Spain	2nd	Senior race	19:38
2006	World Military Cross Country Championships	Tunis, Tunisia	2nd	Short race	14:13
2006	World Cross Country Championships	Fukuoka, Japan	29th	Senior race	26:59
2006	World Cross Country Championships	Fukuoka, Japan	9th	Senior team	175 pts
2006	European Cross Country Championships	San Giorgio, Italy	5th	Senior race	25:28
2006	European Cross Country Championships	San Giorgio, Italy	3rd	Senior team	69 pts
2007	European Cup	Munich, Germany	4th	1500 m	9:00.03
2007	World Championships	Osaka, Japan	—	3000 m s'chase	DNF
2007	European Cross Country Championships	Toro, Spain	2nd	Senior race	27:01
2007	European Cross Country Championships	Toro, Spain	4th	Senior team	77 pts
2008	Military World Cross Country Championships	Thun, Switzerland	7th	Senior women	13:26.0
2008	European Cup	Annecy, France	—	3000 m	DQ

== National titles ==
- French Cross Country Championships
  - Long course: 2006
  - Short course: 2002, 2003, 2005

== See also ==
- List of doping cases in athletics
- France at the 2007 World Championships in Athletics
