= 2001 IAAF World Cross Country Championships – Senior women's race =

Senior women's race at the 2001 IAAF World Cross Country Championships
- Organisers: IAAF
- Edition: 29th
- Date: March 24
- Host city: Ostend, West Flanders, Belgium
- Venue: Hippodrome Wellington
- Events: 1
- Distances: 7.7 km – Senior women
- Participation: 107 athletes from 26 nations

The Senior women's race at the 2001 IAAF World Cross Country Championships was held at the Hippodrome Wellington in Ostend (Oostende), Belgium, on March 24, 2001. Reports of the event were given in The New York Times, in the Herald, and for the IAAF.

Complete results for individuals, for teams, medallists, and the results of British athletes who took part were published.

== Race results ==
=== Senior women's race (7.7 km) ===
==== Individual ====
Rank	Athlete	Country	Time
1st place, gold medalist(s)	Paula Radcliffe	Great Britain	27:49
2nd place, silver medalist(s)	Gete Wami	Ethiopia	27:52
3rd place, bronze medalist(s)	Lydia Cheromei	Kenya	28:07
4	Susan Chepkemei	Kenya	28:13
5	Pamela Chepchumba	Kenya	28:20
6	Leah Malot	Kenya	28:36
7	Yamna Belkacem	France	28:40
8	Merima Denboba	Ethiopia	28:52
9	Olivera Jevtić	Yugoslavia	29:03
10	Anja Smolders	Belgium	29:17
11	Rakiya Maraoui	France	29:24
12	Deena Drossin	United States	29:28
13	Restituta Joseph	Tanzania	29:35
14	Hellen Kimaiyo	Kenya	29:39
15	Anália Rosa	Portugal	29:41
16	Analídia Torre	Portugal	29:42
17	Liz Yelling	Great Britain	29:44
18	Sally Barsosio	Kenya	29:50
19	Chiemi Takahashi	Japan	29:51
20	Rosita Rota Gelpi	Italy	29:53
21	Flavia Gaviglio	Italy	29:56
22	Teresa Recio	Spain	29:58
23	Eyerusalem Kuma	Ethiopia	29:58
24	Rodica Moroianu	France	30:00
25	Yoshiko Fujinaga	Japan	30:01
26	Rosanna Martin	Italy	30:02
27	Jen Rhines	United States	30:03
28	Marta Fernández	Spain	30:06
29	Elizabeth Miller	Australia	30:09
30	Mónica Rosa	Portugal	30:13
31	Beatriz Santíago	Spain	30:16
32	Hayley Yelling	Great Britain	30:18
33	Tara Krzywicki	Great Britain	30:25
34	Ana Dias	Portugal	30:25
35	Zahia Dahmani	France	30:28
36	Tausi Juma	Tanzania	30:29
37	Leila Aman	Ethiopia	30:32
38	María Abel	Spain	30:33
39	Samukeliso Moyo	Zimbabwe	30:35
40	Natalie Harvey	Australia	30:38
41	Merima Hashim	Ethiopia	30:41
42	Clare Taylor	United States	30:45
43	Fatima Yvelain	France	30:48
44	Helena Sampaio	Portugal	30:50
45	Cathérine Lallemand	Belgium	30:56
46	Atalelech Ketema	Ethiopia	30:58
47	Sandra Baumann	Austria	30:59
48	Alessandra Aguilar	Spain	30:59
49	Kristin Chisum	United States	31:01
50	Agata Balsamo	Italy	31:03
51	Angela Newport	Great Britain	31:04
52	Miyuki Nishimura	Japan	31:05
53	Annette Peters	United States	31:19
54	Nebiat Habtemariam	Eritrea	31:19
55	Hawa Hamis Hussein	Tanzania	31:22
56	Lisa Harvey	Canada	31:26
57	Sarah Dupré	Canada	31:29
58	Sherri Smith	Canada	31:36
59	Banuelia Mrashani	Tanzania	31:39
60	Dolores Pulido	Spain	31:45
61	María Paredes	Ecuador	31:50
62	Courtney Babcock	Canada	31:51
63	Lucilla Andreucci	Italy	31:54
64	Stephanie de Croock	Belgium	31:57
65	Adriana de Souza	Brazil	31:58
66	Elizabeth de Souza	Brazil	31:58
67	Patrizia Tisi	Italy	32:05
68	Margareth Iro	Tanzania	32:20
69	Andrea Bertoia	Canada	32:23
70	Marina Bastos	Portugal	32:26
71	Laura Baker	United States	32:27
72	Isabelle Sluysmans	Belgium	32:29
73	Chantal Dällenbach	France	32:33
74	Ellen Leggate	Great Britain	32:41
75	Anniek Beckers	Belgium	32:43
76	Deborah Buhlers	Canada	32:46
77	Maribel Burgos	Puerto Rico	32:54
78	Monica Samila	Tanzania	32:54
79	Patricia van Damme	Belgium	33:03
80	Marlene Acuña	Ecuador	33:13
81	Chanda Mwansa	Zambia	33:17
82	Yukari Kawai	Japan	33:24
83	Luz Cruz	Puerto Rico	33:47
84	Lourdes Cruz	Puerto Rico	33:53
85	Silvia Paredes	Ecuador	33:56
86	Mable Chiwama	Zambia	34:04
87	Bulelwa Ntshangi	South Africa	34:07
88	Narcisa Calderón	Ecuador	34:13
89	Addeh Mwamba	Zambia	34:33
90	Maria Moraes	Brazil	34:46
91	Vijaya Sonwane	India	34:49
92	Natalya Kravets	Belarus	34:54
93	Aruna Devi Waishram	India	35:10
94	Elizabete Cruz	Brazil	35:19
95	Mariya Butakova	Belarus	35:25
96	Bhagwati	India	35:41
97	Wilma Guerra	Ecuador	35:44
98	Yuliya Bubenka	Belarus	35:50
99	Irina Ryzhkova	Belarus	36:27
100	Hilda Sinkala	Zambia	37:12
101	Sharda Gawande	India	37:35
102	Irina Matrosova	Uzbekistan	37:46
103	Yekaterina Dirova	Uzbekistan	39:16
104	Alfiya Mustayeva	Uzbekistan	39:35
105	Anna Baydzhanova	Turkmenistan	39:58
106	Raziya Nurmatova	Uzbekistan	41:51
107	Shemsat Saparova	Turkmenistan	58:13
—	Tania Poma Gonzales	Bolivia	DNS
—	Sindi Hlawe	Swaziland	DNS
—	Sonja Stolić	Yugoslavia	DNS

==== Teams ====
Rank	Team	Points
1st place, gold medalist(s)	Kenya: Lydia Cheromei / 3; Susan Chepkemei / 4; Pamela Chepchumba / 5; Leah Malot / 6; (Hellen Kimaiyo) / (14); (Sally Barsosio) / (18)	18
2nd place, silver medalist(s)	Ethiopia: Gete Wami / 2; Merima Denboba / 8; Eyerusalem Kuma / 23; Leila Aman / 37; (Merima Hashim) / (41); (Atalelech Ketema) / (46)	70
3rd place, bronze medalist(s)	France: Yamna Belkacem / 7; Rakiya Maraoui / 11; Rodica Moroianu / 24; Zahia Dahmani / 35; (Fatima Yvelain) / (43); (Chantal Dällenbach) / (73)	77
4	Great Britain: Paula Radcliffe / 1; Liz Yelling / 17; Hayley Yelling / 32; Tara Krzywicki / 33; (Angela Newport) / (51); (Ellen Leggate) / (74)	83
5	Portugal: Anália Rosa / 15; Analídia Torre / 16; Mónica Rosa / 30; Ana Dias / 34; (Helena Sampaio) / (44); (Marina Bastos) / (70)	95
6	Italy: Rosita Rota Gelpi / 20; Flavia Gaviglio / 21; Rosanna Martin / 26; Agata Balsamo / 50; (Lucilla Andreucci) / (63); (Patrizia Tisi) / (67)	117
7	Spain: Teresa Recio / 22; Marta Fernández / 28; Beatriz Santíago / 31; María Abel / 38; (Alessandra Aguilar) / (48); (Dolores Pulido) / (60)	119
8	United States: Deena Drossin / 12; Jen Rhines / 27; Clare Taylor / 42; Kristin Chisum / 49; (Annette Peters) / (53); (Laura Baker) / (71)	130
9	Tanzania: Restituta Joseph / 13; Tausi Juma / 36; Hawa Hamis Hussein / 55; Banuelia Mrashani / 59; (Margareth Iro) / (68); (Monica Samila) / (78)	163
10	Japan: Chiemi Takahashi / 19; Yoshiko Fujinaga / 25; Miyuki Nishimura / 52; Yukari Kawai / 82	178
11	Belgium: Anja Smolders / 10; Cathérine Lallemand / 45; Stephanie de Croock / 64; Isabelle Sluysmans / 72; (Anniek Beckers) / (75); (Patricia van Damme) / (79)	191
12	Canada: Lisa Harvey / 56; Sarah Dupré / 57; Sherri Smith / 58; Courtney Babcock / 62; (Andrea Bertoia) / (69); (Deborah Buhlers) / (76)	233
13	Ecuador: María Paredes / 61; Marlene Acuña / 80; Silvia Paredes / 85; Narcisa Calderón / 88; (Wilma Guerra) / (97)	314
14	Brazil: Adriana de Souza / 65; Elizabeth de Souza / 66; Maria Moraes / 90; Elizabete Cruz / 94	315
15	Zambia: Chanda Mwansa / 81; Mable Chiwama / 86; Addeh Mwamba / 89; Hilda Sinkala / 100	356
16	India: Vijaya Sonwane / 91; Aruna Devi Waishram / 93; Bhagwati / 96; Sharda Gawande / 101	381
17	Belarus: Natalya Kravets / 92; Mariya Butakova / 95; Yuliya Bubenka / 98; Irina Ryzhkova / 99	384
18	Uzbekistan: Irina Matrosova / 102; Yekaterina Dirova / 103; Alfiya Mustayeva / 104; Raziya Nurmatova / 106	415

- Note: Athletes in parentheses did not score for the team result

== Participation ==
An unofficial count yields the participation of 107 athletes from 26 countries in the Senior women's race. This is in agreement with the official numbers as published. The announced athletes from Bolivia and Swaziland did not show.

- Australia (2)
- Austria (1)
- Belarus (4)
- Belgium (6)
- Brazil (4)
- Canada (6)
- Ecuador (5)
- Eritrea (1)
- Ethiopia (6)
- France (6)
- Great Britain (6)
- India (4)
- Italy (6)
- Japan (4)
- Kenya (6)
- Portugal (6)
- Puerto Rico (3)
- South Africa (1)
- Spain (6)
- Tanzania (6)
- Turkmenistan (2)
- United States (6)
- Uzbekistan (4)
- Yugoslavia (1)
- Zambia (4)
- Zimbabwe (1)

== See also ==
- 2001 IAAF World Cross Country Championships – Senior men's race
- 2001 IAAF World Cross Country Championships – Men's short race
- 2001 IAAF World Cross Country Championships – Junior men's race
- 2001 IAAF World Cross Country Championships – Women's short race
- 2001 IAAF World Cross Country Championships – Junior women's race
