= 2009 European Athletics U23 Championships – Women's 1500 metres =

The women's 1500 metres event at the 2009 European Athletics U23 Championships was held in Kaunas, Lithuania, at S. Dariaus ir S. Girėno stadionas (Darius and Girėnas Stadium) on 17 and 19 July.

== Medalists ==
Gold	Sultan Haydar; Turkey
Silver	Kristina Khalayeva; Russia
Bronze	Yelena Fesenko; Russia

== Results ==
=== Final ===
19 July

Rank	Name	Nationality	Time	Notes
1st place, gold medalist(s)	Sultan Haydar	Turkey	4:14.12	
2nd place, silver medalist(s)	Kristina Khalayeva	Russia	4:14.78	
3rd place, bronze medalist(s)	Yelena Fesenko	Russia	4:15.86	
4	Lindsey De Grande	Belgium	4:15.90	
5	Barbara Maveau	Belgium	4:16.06	
6	Rose-Anne Galligan	Ireland	4:16.15	
7	Emma Pallant	United Kingdom	4:17.23	
8	Angelika Cichocka	Poland	4:17.41	
9	Valentina Costanza	Italy	4:17.55	
10	Laura Miclo	France	4:21.22	
11	Denise Krebs	Germany	4:25.99	
12	Margherita Magnani	Italy	4:26.62	

=== Heats ===
17 July
Qualified: first 4 in each heat and 4 best to the Final

==== Heat 1 ====
Rank	Name	Nationality	Time	Notes
1	Rose-Anne Galligan	Ireland	4:13.66	Q
2	Emma Pallant	United Kingdom	4:13.98	Q
3	Kristina Khalayeva	Russia	4:14.10	Q
4	Barbara Maveau	Belgium	4:14.21	Q
5	Laura Miclo	France	4:15.03	q
6	Angelika Cichocka	Poland	4:16.62	q
7	Margherita Magnani	Italy	4:19.73	q
8	Yana Georgieva	Bulgaria	4:20.31	
9	Maria Panou	Greece	4:21.03	
10	Manon Kruiver	Netherlands	4:24.06	
11	Lídia Sousa	Portugal	4:24.68	
12	Raika Lenaarts	Netherlands	4:24.80	

==== Heat 2 ====
Rank	Name	Nationality	Time	Notes
1	Sultan Haydar	Turkey	4:17.07	Q
2	Yelena Fesenko	Russia	4:17.46	Q
3	Lindsey De Grande	Belgium	4:17.95	Q
4	Denise Krebs	Germany	4:19.87	Q
5	Valentina Costanza	Italy	4:19.96	q
6	Agata Strausa	Latvia	4:20.76	
7	Claire Navez	France	4:21.76	
8	Sara Treacy	Ireland	4:24.08	
9	Mihaela Loghin	Romania	4:24.28	
10	Solange Andreia Pereira	Portugal	4:25.72	
11	Oleseia Smovjenco	Moldova	4:27.63	
12	Lydia Windbichler	Austria	4:28.57	
13	Tereza Čapková	Czech Republic	4:30.41	

== Participation ==
According to an unofficial count, 25 athletes from 18 countries participated in the event.

- Austria (1)
- Belgium (2)
- Bulgaria (1)
- Czech Republic (1)
- France (2)
- Germany (1)
- Greece (1)
- Ireland (2)
- Italy (2)
- Latvia (1)
- Moldova (1)
- Netherlands (2)
- Poland (1)
- Portugal (2)
- Romania (1)
- Russia (2)
- Turkey (1)
- United Kingdom (1)
