= Joseph Genet =

French athlete and sports administrator (1876–1939)

- Genet in 1926
- Born: Jean-Joseph Genet; 27 November 1876; Geneva, Switzerland
- Died: 23 December 1939 (aged 63); Paris, France
- Occupations: Long-distance runner Sports administrator
- Known for: Founding president of the French Athletics Federation
- Title: President of the French Athletics Federation
- Term: 1920–1937
- Predecessor: Office established
- Awards: Legion of Honour

Jean-Joseph Genet (27 November 1876 – 23 December 1939) was a French long-distance runner and the founding president of the French Athletics Federation, serving from 1920 to 1937.

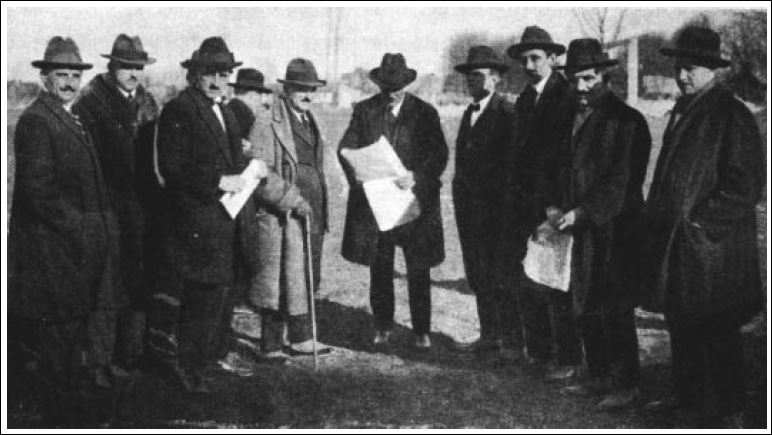
Working session at the Colombes stadium for members of the Technical Commission for athletics and the Sports Commission of the French Olympic Committee. From left to right: Captain Beaupuis, Dr Casalis, J. Roussel, J. Genet, A. Ave, Frantz-Reichel, Paul Méricamp, A. Joureau and Émile Lucas

== Biography ==
Born in Geneva, Jean Genet spent his early years in the Ain department. He accompanied his parents to Paris, where he regularly attended evening and Sunday meetings of the Union Athlétique du Premier Arrondissement, held in the Tuileries Garden, on the Orangerie terrace, or on the Place du Carrousel. He was the French record holder in the 5000 metres in 1895, with a time of 18:03.06. A member of the UAI, Genet took part in cross country running during the winter; in 1896, he competed in the National, finishing 19th. In 1897, behind Michel Soalhat, he took second place in the National. Following his high placing in the National, Genet joined the Racing Club de France in 1898; he tried his hand at several fairly long distances and at the one-hour run. A member of the Association Vélocipédique d'Amateurs (AVA), he took part, by bicycle or tandem, in the society's excursions and several of its events.

Genet held an important position in the administration of sport: he was president of the running commission, then a member of the governing committee of the Racing Club de France; within the Union des sociétés françaises de sports athlétiques, he became president of the USFSA athletics governing committee from 1901, and later secretary-general of the USFSA. When sports began to form separate federations, Genet was unanimously chosen to become president of the new French Athletics Federation.

On 20 November 1920, the founding congress of the FFA met in Paris in the presence of 150 delegates, under Genet's chairmanship, assisted by Edmond Mamelle, Marcel Delarbre and Auguste Audirac. Among the questions debated was the representation of clubs that were not affiliated with the USFSA. Frantz Reichel argued that this should not be allowed, but Genet's opposing view prevailed, with the aim of bringing together all associations practising athletics within a single organisation.

He represented the FFA on the Comité national des sports, serving as vice-president from 1932 until 1939, and on the French Olympic Committee, where he served on its important commissions. He contributed to the preparation and organisation of the 1924 Paris Olympics, and served on ministerial committees, including the Higher Advisory Committee on Physical Education.

In 1924, Genet replaced Frantz Reichel at the IAAF. He secured the organisation of the 1938 European Athletics Championships for the FFA.

== Honours ==
Legion of Honour (1932)
