= 2005 European Cross Country Championships =

Coordinates: 51°32′56″N 5°06′25″E

- Organisers: EAA
- Edition: 12th
- Date: 11 December
- Host city: Tilburg, Netherlands
- Events: 4
- Distances: 9.84 km – Men; 6.5 km – Women; 6.5 km – Junior men 4.83 km – Junior women

The 12th European Cross Country Championships were held at Tilburg in Netherlands on 11 December 2005. Serhiy Lebid won the men's competition for the sixth time and Lornah Kiplagat won the women's race.

== Results ==
=== Men individual 9.84 km ===
| Pos. | Runners | Time |
|---|---|---|
| 1st place, gold medalist(s) | (Ukraine) Serhiy Lebid | 27:09 |
| 2nd place, silver medalist(s) | (Spain) Alberto García | 27:21 |
| 3rd place, bronze medalist(s) | (France) Driss Maazouzi | 27:26 |
| 4. | (France) Bouabdellah Tahri | 27:27 |
| 5. | (Austria) Günther Weidlinger | 27:28 |
| 6. | (France) Mokhtar Benhari | 27:35 |
| 7. | (Belgium) Tom Van Hooste | 27:36 |
| 8. | (France) Khalid Zoubaa | 27:36 |
| 9. | (Spain) Juan Carlos de la Ossa | 27:36 |
| 10. | (Spain) José Ríos | 27:37 |
| 11. | (Portugal) Fernando Silva | 27:39 |
| 12. | (Republic of Ireland) Gary Murray | 27:41 |

Total 90 competitors

=== Men teams ===
| Pos. | Team | Points |
|---|---|---|
| 1st place, gold medalist(s) | France; Driss Maazouzi; Bouabdellah Tahri; Mokhtar Benhari; Khalid Zoubaa | 20 |
| 2nd place, silver medalist(s) | Spain; Alberto García; Juan Carlos de la Ossa; José Ríos; Iván Galán | 64 |
| 3rd place, bronze medalist(s) | Ukraine; Serhiy Lebid; Leonid Rybak; Jevgeni Bozhko; Juri Hitshun | 70 |
| 4. | Italy | 75 |
| 5. | Portugal | 94 |
| 6. | Russia | 124 |
| 7. | United Kingdom | 129 |
| 8. | Ireland | 139 |

Total 15 teams

=== Women individual 6.5 km ===
| Pos. | Runners | Time |
|---|---|---|
| 1st place, gold medalist(s) | (Netherlands) Lornah Kiplagat | 19:55 |
| 2nd place, silver medalist(s) | (Germany) Sabrina Mockenhaupt | 20:00 |
| 3rd place, bronze medalist(s) | (Sweden) Johanna Nilsson | 20:01 |
| 4. | (Serbia and Montenegro) Olivera Jevtić | 20:04 |
| 5. | (Hungary) Anikó Kálovics | 20:15 |
| 6. | (United Kingdom) Hayley Yelling | 20:16 |
| 7. | (Russia) Inga Abitova | 20:16 |
| 8. | (United Kingdom) Liz Yelling | 20:17 |
| 9. | (Spain) Rosa Morató | 20:18 |
| 10. | (Russia) Mariya Konovalova | 20:18 |
| 11. | (Republic of Ireland) Mary Cullen | 20:22 |
| 12. | (Belgium) Veerle Dejaeghere | 20:24 |

Total 74 competitors

=== Women teams ===
| Pos. | Team | Points |
|---|---|---|
| 1st place, gold medalist(s) | Russia; Inga Abitova; Mariya Konovalova; Lidiya Grigoryeva; Liliya Shobukhova | 52 |
| 2nd place, silver medalist(s) | United Kingdom; Hayley Yelling; Liz Yelling; Kate Reed; Natalie Harvey | 54 |
| 3rd place, bronze medalist(s) | France; Latifa Essarokh; Yamna Oubouhou; Maria Martins; Fatiha Klilech-Fauvel | 73 |
| 4. | Portugal | 87 |
| 5. | Ireland | 106 |
| 6. | Netherlands | 109 |
| 7. | Germany | 126 |
| 8. | Belgium | 157 |

Total 11 teams

=== Junior men individual 6.5 km ===
| Pos. | Runners | Time |
|---|---|---|
| 1st place, gold medalist(s) | (Hungary) Barnabás Bene | 18:41 |
| 2nd place, silver medalist(s) | (United Kingdom) Andrew Vernon | 18:42 |
| 3rd place, bronze medalist(s) | (Serbia and Montenegro) Dušan Markešević | 18:42 |
| 4. | (Romania) Ciprian Suhanea | 18:50 |
| 5. | (Spain) Mohamed el Bendir | 18:50 |
| 6. | (Romania) Stefan Patru | 18:52 |
| 7. | (Belarus) Siarhei Chabiarak | 18:53 |
| 8. | (Poland) Arkadiusz Gardzielewski | 18:54 |

Total 102 competitors

=== Junior men teams ===
| Pos. | Team | Points |
|---|---|---|
| 1st place, gold medalist(s) | Poland; Kamil Murzyn; Marcin Chabowski; Arkadiusz Gardzielewski; Lukasz Skoczynski | 60 |
| 2nd place, silver medalist(s) | United Kingdom | 61 |
| 3rd place, bronze medalist(s) | Romania | 80 |
| 4. | Italy | 94 |
| 5. | Spain | 111 |
| 6. | Portugal | 135 |
| 7. | Russia | 144 |
| 8. | Turkey | 145 |

Total 17 teams

=== Junior women individual 4.83 km ===
| Pos. | Runners | Time |
|---|---|---|
| 1st place, gold medalist(s) | (Romania) Ancuţa Bobocel | 15:23 |
| 2nd place, silver medalist(s) | (United Kingdom) Emily Pidgeon | 15:25 |
| 3rd place, bronze medalist(s) | (Netherlands) Susan Kuijken | 15.33 |
| 4. | (Republic of Ireland) Linda Byrne | 15:39 |
| 5. | (Russia) Galina Maksimova | 15:40 |
| 6. | (United Kingdom) Morag Maclarty | 15:42 |
| 7. | (United Kingdom) Stephanie Twell | 15:45 |
| 8. | (Russia) Yulija Ivanova | 15:47 |

Total 82 competitors

=== Junior women teams ===
| Pos. | Team | Points |
|---|---|---|
| 1st place, gold medalist(s) | United Kingdom; Emily Pidgeon; Morag Maclarty; Stephanie Twell; Sian Edwards | 33 |
| 2nd place, silver medalist(s) | Romania | 48 |
| 3rd place, bronze medalist(s) | Russia | 56 |
| 4. | Belgium | 114 |
| 5. | Ireland | 119 |
| 6. | Turkey | 142 |
| 7. | Spain | 147 |
| 8. | Germany | 156 |

Total 13 teams
