= Louis Orphée =

French long-distance runner (1878–1959)

- Orphée in 1906

Personal information
- Full name: Louis Augustin Orphée
- Nationality: French
- Born: 3 January 1878 Paris, France
- Died: 7 March 1959 (aged 81) Colombes, Hauts-de-Seine, France

Sport
- Sport: Athletics
- Events: Marathon; Long-distance running Six-day racing

Louis Augustin Orphée (3 January 1878 – 7 March 1959) was a French professional long-distance runner who competed in road races, marathon-distance events and long-distance pedestrian races in France and the United States.

== Biography ==
Orphée with his trainers in 1909

Orphée winning 1909 Rouen-Paris over 156 km.

Orphée was born in the 16th arrondissement of Paris in 1878. Orphée competed at two professional events during held during the 1900 Summer Olympics. He finished fourth in the professional six-hour race, covering 67.2 km, and fourth in the professional 5,000 metres.

In 1903, he and fellow French runner Édouard Cibot won the six-day race at Madison Square Garden in New York, covering about 1,200 km as a relay team. In 1904, Orphée won the professional Conflans–Paris race, approximately 40 km, in 2:41:10. In 1905 he won on 7 May the race Paris-Créteil-Bonneuil and won the same year the Les Sports cross-country race in Argenteuil.

Orphée competed in the professional athletics championship at Gentilly in 1906. In 1908 he was sixth in the marathon in London, recording 2:48:42.

In 1909, Orphée travelled to the United States as part of a group of European professional distance runners. He and Cibot competed as a French team in the six-day race at Madison Square Garden, taking first place with 732 miles and six laps (about 1,179 km). In 1909, Orphée won the Boston Marathon in April in 2:51:27, and won the Brighton Beach Marathon in May in 2:59:57.4. He also competed in the international marathon at the Polo Grounds in New York on 8 May 1909.

Back in France, Orphée won the third edition of Rouen-Paris, a race over 156 kilometres held on 19 September. In 1910 he won the 186 km Reims–Paris race in 17:42:00, and in 1911 he won the six-hour section of the French 100 km championship at Gentilly, covering 72.137 km.
