= Louis Bouchard =

French professional long-distance runner

- Louis Bouchard in 1922

Personal information
- Nationality: French
- Born: Lucien Bouchard; 19 January 1884 Paris (10th), France
- Died: 14 November 1963 (aged 79) Saint-Hilaire-Saint-Florent, France

Sport
- Sport: Long-distance running Cross country running

Bouchard working in his atelier after his athletics career in 1931

Lucien "Louis" Bouchard, (19 January 1884 – 14 November 1963) was a French professional long-distance runner and cross country runner.

Bouchard was born in the 10th arrondissement of Paris in 1884. After winning the bronze medal at the 1904 French Cross Country Championships he won the silver medal in 1905 and 1906 behind Gaston Ragueneau. In 1905 and 1906 he won the Challenge Ayçaguer. Between 1903 and 1905 he set four times the French record in the 10,000 metres, setting the final record in October 1905 with a time of 33:14.8.

== Achievements ==
=== National records ===
1903
1 November - 10,000 metres: 34:19.4 at Gentilly
8 November - 10,000 metres: 34:13.8 at Gentilly

1904
30 October- 10,000 metres: 33:39.0 at Gentilly.

1905
22 October, - 10,000 metres: 33:14.8 at Gentilly

=== Other achievements ===
1904
(bronze) French Cross Country Championships

1905
(silver) French Cross Country Championships
1st Challenge Ayçaguer

1906
(silver) French Cross Country Championships
1st Challenge Ayçaguer
