= 2003 European Athletics U23 Championships – Women's 1500 metres =

The women's 1500 metres event at the 2003 European Athletics U23 Championships was held in Bydgoszcz, Poland, at Zawisza Stadion on 17 and 19 July.

== Medalists ==
Gold	Olesya Chumakova; Russia
Silver	Lisa Dobriskey; United Kingdom
Bronze	Ingvill Måkestad; Norway

== Results ==
=== Final ===
19 July

Rank	Name	Nationality	Time	Notes
1st place, gold medalist(s)	Olesya Chumakova	Russia	4:11.75	
2nd place, silver medalist(s)	Lisa Dobriskey	United Kingdom	4:12.95	
3rd place, bronze medalist(s)	Ingvill Måkestad	Norway	4:13.58	
4	Johanna Nilsson	Sweden	4:13.64	
5	Christina Carruzzo	Switzerland	4:15.15	
6	Yelena Soboleva	Russia	4:15.22	
7	Marina Munćan	Serbia and Montenegro	4:15.32	
8	Natalie Lewis	United Kingdom	4:15.47	
9	Irene Alfonso	Spain	4:15.55	
10	Julie Coulaud	France	4:18.09	
11	Louise Whittaker	United Kingdom	4:22.93	
	Rasa Drazdauskaitė	Lithuania	DQ^{†}	Doping

^{†}: Rasa Drazdauskaitė ranked initially 2nd (4:12.16), but was disqualified for infringement of IAAF doping rules.

=== Heats ===
17 July
Qualified: first 4 in each heat and 4 best to the Final

==== Heat 1 ====
Rank	Name	Nationality	Time	Notes
1	Louise Whittaker	United Kingdom	4:15.31	Q
2	Yelena Soboleva	Russia	4:15.37	Q
3	Lisa Dobriskey	United Kingdom	4:15.43	Q
4	Julie Coulaud	France	4:15.68	q
5	Iryna Vashchuk	Ukraine	4:15.98	
6	Nastassia Staravoitava	Belarus	4:16.01	
7	Katarzyna Czubska	Poland	4:18.13	
8	Ragnhild Kvarberg	Norway	4:19.19	
9	Joanna Podolska	Poland	4:19.65	
10	Daniela Cîmpanu	Romania	4:23.45	
11	Daniela Kuleska	North Macedonia	4:24.90	
12	Kajsa Haglund	Sweden	4:28.05	
	Rasa Drazdauskaitė	Lithuania	DQ	Q^{†}

^{†}: Rasa Drazdauskaitė initially reached the final (4:14.90), but was disqualified later for infringement of IAAF doping rules.

==== Heat 2 ====
Rank	Name	Nationality	Time	Notes
1	Olesya Chumakova	Russia	4:13.79	Q
2	Natalie Lewis	United Kingdom	4:14.10	Q
3	Ingvill Måkestad	Norway	4:15.11	Q
4	Marina Munćan	Serbia and Montenegro	4:15.28	Q
5	Irene Alfonso	Spain	4:15.43	q
6	Christina Carruzzo	Switzerland	4:15.88	q
7	Johanna Nilsson	Sweden	4:15.95	q
8	Monika Augustin-Vogel	Switzerland	4:16.28	
9	Angela Rinicella	Italy	4:16.67	
10	Irina Latve	Latvia	4:19.09	
11	Corine van Beek	Netherlands	4:21.10	
12	Mieke Geens	Belgium	4:27.68	

== Participation ==
According to an unofficial count, 25 athletes from 18 countries participated in the event.

- Belarus (1)
- Belgium (1)
- France (1)
- Italy (1)
- Latvia (1)
- Lithuania (1)
- North Macedonia (1)
- Netherlands (1)
- Norway (2)
- Poland (2)
- Romania (1)
- Russia (2)
- Serbia and Montenegro (1)
- Spain (1)
- Sweden (2)
- Switzerland (2)
- Ukraine (1)
- United Kingdom (3)
