= Athletics at the 1959 Summer Universiade – Women's 800 metres =

The men's 800 metres event at the 1959 Summer Universiade was held at the Stadio Comunale di Torino in Turin on 5 September 1959.

== Results ==
Rank	Name	Nationality	Time	Notes
1st place, gold medalist(s)	Nicole Goullieux	France	2:11.1	
2nd place, silver medalist(s)	Edith Schiller	West Germany	2:11.3	
3rd place, bronze medalist(s)	Klavdiya Babintseva	Soviet Union	2:12.3	
4	Tsvetana Isaeva	Bulgaria	2:13.4	
5	Marlis Cutui	Romania	2:16.2	
6	Monika Kropáčová	Czechoslovakia	2:17.2	
7	Franca De Paoli	Italy	2:18.7	
8	Ariane Döser	West Germany	2:22.4	
9	Hanna Karłowska	Poland	2:24.3	
