= Rakiya Maraoui-Quétier =

Personal information
- Nationality: French
- Born: 12 September 1967 (age 58) Bni Bataou, Morocco

Sport
- Event(s): marathon, cross country
Medal record
Jeux de la Francophonie
Gold medal – first place	1989 Casablanca	Marathon

Rakiya Maraoui Quétier (born 12 September 1967) is a Moroccan-born French former long-distance runner who competed mainly in the marathon and cross country running. She competed in the marathon at the World Athletics Championships in 1993 and 2003, and represented France at the 2004 Summer Olympics. She was a three-time participant at the IAAF World Cross Country Championships (1986, 2000, 2001) and ran at the 1998 IAAF World Half Marathon Championships. She was the marathon gold medallist at the 1989 Jeux de la Francophonie. On the road running circuit, she was the winner of the 1990 Roma-Ostia Half Marathon and 2001 Corrida de Houilles

Born in Bni Bataou near the city of Beni Mellal, she is the sister of Fatna Maraoui, who later competed for the Italy national athletics team.

Rakiya distinguished herself at the 1999 European Cross Country Championships winning, under the team classification, the European title at Velenje Slovenia, alongside Fatima Yvelain and Fatima Hajjami.

In 2001, she won the team bronze medal at the 2000 IAAF World Cross Country Championships at Vilamoura Portugal, alongside Light-Fatima Yvelain, Yamna Oubouhou-Belkacem and Blandine Bitzner-Ducret. The following year, at the World Cross Country Championships at Ostend, she won another team bronze medal, alongside Oubouhou Yamna-Belkacem, Rodica Nagel and Zahia Dahmani.

In 2003, she finished third at the Paris Half Marathon, and fifth in the Paris Marathon and placed 21st at the marathon of the World Championships in Paris / Saint-Denis. In the marathon of the Olympic Games in Athens in 2004, she did not finish.

Nationally, she won the title of champion of France in the 10 000 m in 2000, in Cross-country in 2000 and 2001 (long race) and in the marathon in 1999.

She acquired French nationality by marriage in 1998.

== National titles ==
- French Athletics Championships
  - 10,000 m: 2000
- French Cross Country Championships
  - Long course: 2000, 2001
- French Marathon Championships: 1999

== Personal bests ==
- 5000 metres: 15:46.30 min, 5 June 1999, Marseille
- 10,000 metres: 31:56.1 min, 27 June 2000, Strasbourg
- 10K run: 32:52 min, 23 March 2003, La Courneuve
- Half marathon: 1:09:29 h, 10 March 1996, Lisbon
- Marathon: 2:28:17 h, 24 September 1995, Berlin

== See also ==
- List of eligibility transfers in athletics
- List of sportspeople who competed for more than one nation
