= Lucie Bréard =

French middle-distance runner

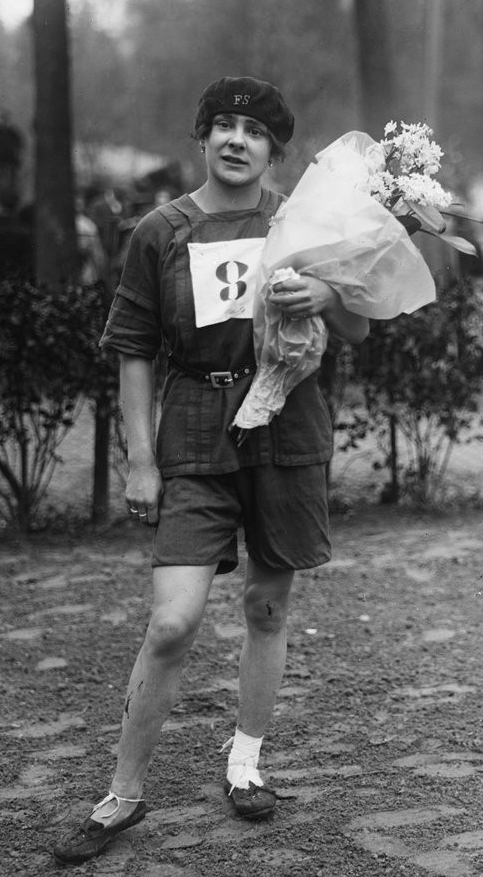
- Bréard in 1921

Personal information
- Born: 12 September 1902 Île-de-France, France
- Died: 26 June 1988 (aged 85) Saumur, France

Sport
- Sport: Athletics
- Event: 800 m

Achievements and titles
- Personal best: 800 m – 2:30.2 (1921)
Medal record
Representing France
Women's World Games
| Gold medal – first place | 1921 Monte Carlo | 800 m |
| Gold medal – first place | 1922 Paris | 1000 m |

Lucie Marie Bréard (later Jurion, 12 September 1902 – 26 June 1988) was a French middle-distance runner. She competed at the 1921 and 1922 Women's World Games and won the gold medals in the 800m (1921) and 1000m events (1922, setting a new world record). She was the French cross-country champion in 1920 and 1921.

Her main competitors were French Marcelle Neveu (of club UA St. Cloud, who held the world record for 1000m in 1921 and the European 800m record in 1922, and was French cross country champion in 1922, 1923 and 1924), and Georgette Lenoir (holder of the world record for 1000m in 1922). Previously, French Lucie Cadiès, also running for club Femina Sport in 1918, and in 1919 Suzanne Guery had held the world record for 1000m).

La Vie au Grand Air edition of 13 September 1921 devoted a full story to Lucie Breard and the magazine Spiridon October–November 1983 also wrote of her. She married in 1924.

== Prize List ==
- World Record Holder at 800m in 1921 running 2min 30.2s
- World Record Holder at 1000m in 1920, 1921 and 1922 running 3min 12.2s
- Holder of European Record at 800m in 1920
- (gold) Gold Medal at 800m at the 1st meeting of International féminin in 1921, at Monte-Carlo (other champions from Fémina Sport club, who were winners in 1921 : Violette Morris, in Shot Put and Javelin, Germaine Delapierre at the 100 yards hurdles (74m hurdles) and Frédérique Kussel in the High Jump — see Miroir des Sports of 14/04/1921)
- (gold) Gold Medal at the 1000m at the first Jeux mondiaux féminins (called the Olympic Championships) in 1922 (sole French winner), at Paris (2nd Georgette Lenoir)
- (gold) French Cross Country Championships in 1920 and 1921
- (gold) Champion of France at middle-distance (800m – 1500m).
