= Georgette Lenoir =

French athlete (fl. 1922–1928)

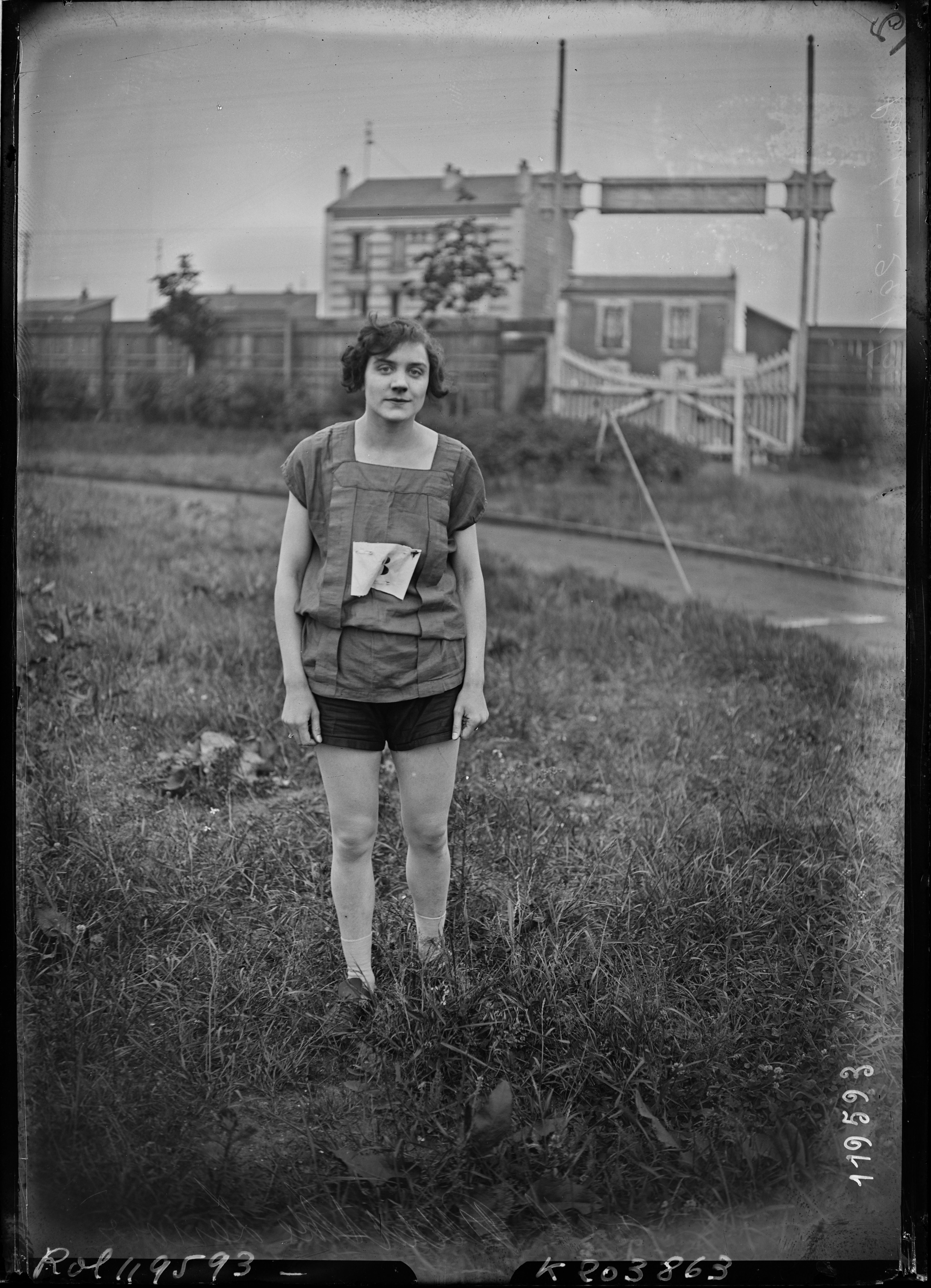
- Occupations: Track and field competitor
- Years active: 1922–1928
- Known for: Holder of world championship track titles

Georgette Lenoir (fl. 1922–1928) was a French track and field athlete and a world record holder in the 800 meters and 1000 meters and silver medalist at the first Women's Olympics in 1922 in Paris, and she was a pioneer in women's sports.

== Biography ==
Georgette Lenoir was born in central France. In her youth, she was an active athlete and later joined the women's sports association "Fémina Sport" (founded in 1912) in Paris. She competed for the club throughout her active sporting career and specialized in middle-distance running. She held several world championship titles at various running distances and also competed in the high jump.

She participated in the 1922 Women's Games in Monte Carlo, Monaco, where she competed in running 250 meters, high jump, pentathlon (then running 60 meters, 300 meters, javelin throw, high jump and shot put) but without reaching a medal place. On 6 August of the same year, she set a world record in running 1000 meters at competitions in Paris, this also became the first official world record in this category.

On 25 June 1922, she also set a world record in the 4 x 250 meters relay (with Andrée Darreau, Simone Chapoteau, Georgette Lenoir as third runner and Cécile Maugars) with a time of 2:33.4 min at a competition in Colombes, France.

On 20 August 1922, at the "Women's Olympics," established by Alice Milliat who was a leader in the women’s sports movement in France, Lenoir also set a world record in running 800 meters, becoming the first official world record in this category. She narrowly lost a gold medal running 1000 meters in 3:12.2, but finishing just after Lucie Bréard's time of 3:12.0.

Lenoir then participated in the 1923 Women's Olympics in Monte Carlo, where she set a French record (and unofficial world record) during the 500 meters and 1000 meters, but without receiving a medal. Later that year, she participated in her first French Championships (Championnats de France d'Athlétisme) on 15 July in Bourges where she ran in the 1000 meters but didn't finish that race.

At the French Championships in 1924, she won the silver medal in the 1000-meter run at events held on 14 July at the Pershing Stadium in Paris.
