= Inga Abitova =

Russian long-distance runner

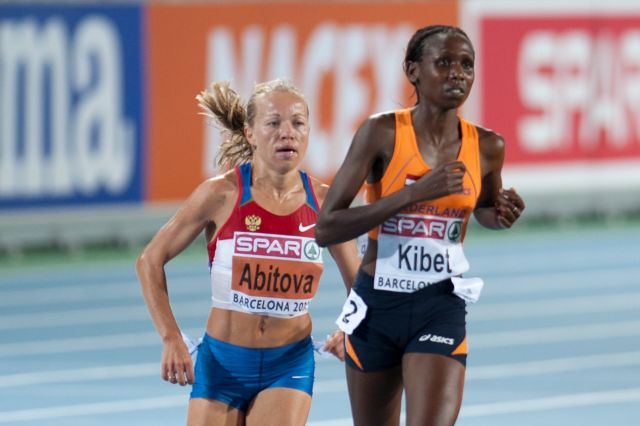

Medal record

Women's athletics

Representing Russia

European Championships
Gold medal – first place	2006 Gothenburg	10,000 m
Disqualified	2010 Barcelona	10,000 m

Inga Eduardovna Abitova (Russian: Инга Эдуардовна Абитова, born 6 March 1982 in Novokuybyshevsk) is a Russian long-distance runner, who specializes in the 10,000 metres and the marathon. She was the 2006 European Champion in the 10,000 m and reached the final at the 2008 Summer Olympics.

== Doping ==
In 2012, she was given a two-year ban for breaking anti-doping regulations. The reason given was an "abnormal haemoglobin profile in her biological passport". Her competition results will be annulled, beginning 10 October 2009 and her suspension began on 11 October 2012.

In May 2016, it was reported that Abitova was one of 14 Russian athletes, implicated in doping following the retesting of urine from the 2008 Olympic Games. Abitova was named by Russian press agency TASS as having failed the retest, which was undertaken following the Russian doping scandal of 2015 and 2016. If confirmed, under IOC and IAAF rules, she stands to lose all results, medals and records from the date of the original test to May 2016. Her doping offence was confirmed on 13 September.

== Career ==
As a junior athlete Abitova finished eleventh in the 3000 metres at the 1999 World Youth Championships. She began cross country running and – after taking part in the 2001 IAAF World Cross Country Championships – she took fourth place in the junior race at the 2005 European Cross Country Championships, helping the Russian junior team to a gold medal. She won the Belgrade Marathon in 2005, finishing in 2:38:20, and ran at the 2005 European Cross Country Championships, taking seventh place and leading the Russian women to a team gold.

In 2006, she became European champion over the 10,000 metres at the 2006 European Championships in Gothenburg, Sweden. Her winning time of 30:31.42 minutes meant a new personal best for her and the seventh-best time ever run by a European woman. Abitova won the 10,000 m at the 2007 Russian Championships. She later finished twelfth at the 2007 World Championships and sixth at the 2008 Olympic Games.

The following year she ran at the 2009 IAAF World Half Marathon Championships and finished in ninth place – the best performance by a European woman. She participated in the inaugural edition of the Yokohama Women's Marathon held in Japan and she won the race in a time of 2:27:18. Abitova broke from the main pack at the 30 km mark and was unchallenged to the finish. Her first major race of 2010 was the London Marathon and she was the runner-up behind compatriot Liliya Shobukhova, having finished the race in a time of 2:22:19. Her results from the 2009 IAAF World Half Marathon Championships onwards were subsequently annulled.

Currently, she trains under Vladimir Timofeyev. She graduated from the Samara Institute of Law of the Federal Penitentiary Service.

== Personal life ==
Abitova is married and has one son.

== Competition record ==
Year	Competition	Venue	Position	Event	Notes
1999	World Youth Championships	Bydgoszcz, Poland	11th	3000 m	
2001	World Cross Country Championships	Ostend, Belgium	30th	Junior race	
2001	European Cross Country Championships	Thun, Switzerland	4th	Junior race	
2001	European Cross Country Championships	Thun, Switzerland	1st	Junior team	
2005	European Cross Country Championships	Tilburg, Netherlands	7th	Senior race	
2005	European Cross Country Championships	Tilburg, Netherlands	1st	Senior team	
2005	Belgrade Marathon	Belgrade, Yugoslavia	1st	Marathon	
2006	European Championships	Gothenburg, Sweden	1st	10,000 m	
2006	European Cross Country Championships	San Giorgio su Legnano, Italy	31st	Senior race	
2006	Mumbai Marathon	Mumbai, India	2nd	Marathon	
2007	London Marathon	London, United Kingdom	9th	Marathon	
2007	World Championships	Osaka, Japan	12th	10,000 m	
2008	Summer Olympics	Beijing, China	DSQ ~~6th~~	10,000 m	
2009	London Marathon	London, United Kingdom	6th	Marathon	
2009	World Half Marathon Championships	Birmingham, United Kingdom	DSQ ~~9th~~	Half marathon	
2009	Yokohama Women's Marathon	Yokohama, Japan	DSQ ~~1st~~	Marathon	
2010	London Marathon	London, United Kingdom	DSQ ~~2nd~~	Marathon	~~2:22:19~~
2010	New York City Marathon	New York, United States	DSQ ~~4th~~	Marathon	~~2:29:17~~

== See also ==
- List of doping cases in athletics
- List of European Athletics Championships medalists (women)
- List of stripped European Athletics Championships medals
- List of winners of the London Marathon
- Doping at the Olympic Games
