= 1999 European Cross Country Championships =

- Organisers: EAA
- Edition: 6th
- Date: 12 December
- Host city: Velenje, Slovenia
- Events: 4

The 6th European Cross Country Championships were held at Velenje in Slovenia on 12 December 1999. Paulo Guerra took his third title in the men's competition and Anita Weyermann won the women's race.

== Results ==
=== Men individual ===
| Pos. | Runners | Time |
|---|---|---|
| 1st place, gold medalist(s) | (Portugal) Paulo Guerra | 32:45 |
| 2nd place, silver medalist(s) | (Portugal) Eduardo Henriques | 32:50 |
| 3rd place, bronze medalist(s) | (United Kingdom) Jon Brown | 33:32 |
| 4. | (France) Mustapha El Ahmadi | 33:41 |
| 5. | (Portugal) Domingos Castro | 33:44 |
| 6. | (Sweden) Claes Nyberg | 33:46 |
| 7. | (Ukraine) Serhiy Lebid | 33:50 |
| 8. | (Italy) Umberto Pusterla | 33:53 |

79 runners finished

=== Men teams ===
| Pos. | Team | Points |
|---|---|---|
| 1st place, gold medalist(s) | United Kingdom; Jon Brown; Karl Keska; Dominic Bannister; Keith Cullen | 35 |
| 2nd place, silver medalist(s) | Portugal; Paulo Guerra; Eduardo Henriques; Domingos Castro; Vítor Almeida | 41 |
| 3rd place, bronze medalist(s) | France; Mustapha El Ahmadi; Lahbib Hanini; Augusto Gomes; Laurent Vapaille | 58 |
| 4. | Italy | 71 |
| 5. | Ireland | 94 |
| 6. | Spain | 107 |
| 7. | Belgium | 125 |
| 8. | Romania | 131 |

Total 15 teams

=== Women individual ===
| Pos. | Runners | Time |
|---|---|---|
| 1st place, gold medalist(s) | (Switzerland) Anita Weyermann | 18:53 |
| 2nd place, silver medalist(s) | (Romania) Constantina Diţă | 19:01 |
| 3rd place, bronze medalist(s) | (Serbia and Montenegro) Olivera Jevtić | 19:03 |
| 4. | (United Kingdom) Liz Yelling | 19:06 |
| 5. | (Russia) Tatyana Tomashova | 19:09 |
| 6. | (France) Rakiya Maraoui-Quetier | 19:09 |
| 7. | (Russia) Margarita Marusova | 19:10 |
| 8. | (France) Fatima Yvelain | 19:14 |

58 runners finished

=== Women teams ===
| Pos. | Team | Points |
|---|---|---|
| 1st place, gold medalist(s) | France; Rakiya Maraoui-Quetier; Fatima Yvelain; Fatima Hajjami | 34 |
| 2nd place, silver medalist(s) | Romania; Constantina Diţă; Iulia Olteanu; Lelia Papură | 35 |
| 3rd place, bronze medalist(s) | Portugal; Helena Sampaio; Marina Bastos; Analídia Torre | 39 |
| 4. | United Kingdom | 41 |
| 5. | Italy | 63 |
| 6. | Ireland | 67 |
| 7. | Belgium | 82 |
| 8. | Spain | 88 |

Total 12 teams

=== Junior Men individual ===
| Pos. | Runners | Time |
|---|---|---|
| 1st place, gold medalist(s) | (Belgium) Hans Janssens | 23:00 |
| 2nd place, silver medalist(s) | (France) Guillaume Eraud | 23:12 |
| 3rd place, bronze medalist(s) | (Finland) Turo Inkiläinen | 23:12 |
| 4. | (Austria) Martin Pröll | 23:15 |
| 5. | (United Kingdom) Mo Farah | 23:18 |
| 6. | (Germany) Carlo Schuff | 23:19 |
| 7. | (Norway) Gunnar Osmundsen | 23:20 |
| 8. | (Republic of Ireland) Gary Murray | 23:23 |

=== Junior men teams ===
| Pos. | Team | Points |
|---|---|---|
| 1st place, gold medalist(s) | United Kingdom | 26 |
| 2nd place, silver medalist(s) | France | 38 |
| 3rd place, bronze medalist(s) | Ireland | 43 |
| 4. | Portugal | 45 |
| 5. | Germany | 54 |
| 6. | Austria | 81 |
| 7. | Spain | 89 |
| 8. | Italy | 99 |

=== Junior women individual ===
| Pos. | Runners | Time |
|---|---|---|
| 1st place, gold medalist(s) | (Portugal) Inês Monteiro | 12:48 |
| 2nd place, silver medalist(s) | (Switzerland) Nicola Spirig | 12:55 |
| 3rd place, bronze medalist(s) | (Romania) Ane Marie Moutsinga | 13:02 |
| 4. | (Turkey) Türkan Erişmiş | 13:07 |
| 5. | (Belgium) Kim Offergeld | 13:09 |
| 6. | (Turkey) Sebile Bekele Özyurt | 13:10 |
| 7. | (Finland) Minna Myllykoski | 13:10 |
| 8. | (Portugal) Jéssica Augusto | 13:11 |

=== Junior women teams ===
| Pos. | Team | Points |
|---|---|---|
| 1st place, gold medalist(s) | Turkey | 27 |
| 2nd place, silver medalist(s) | Portugal | 32 |
| 3rd place, bronze medalist(s) | Belgium | 34 |
| 4. | Switzerland | 40 |
| 5. | Romania | 49 |
| 6. | Finland | 68 |
| 7. | United Kingdom | 79 |
| 8. | Italy | 92 |
