= Irene Alfonso =

Spanish middle-distance runner

Irene Alfonso García (born 6 February 1981) is a retired Spanish middle distance runner who specialized in the 800 and 1500 metres.

In her early career, she competed at the 2000 World Junior Championships without reaching the final, and placed lowly in the junior races at the 1999 and 2000 World Cross Country Championships (53rd and 41st). She later finished ninth at the 2003 European U23 Championships before reaching full senior age.

Alfonso then won the gold medal at the 2004 Ibero-American Championships, finished seventh at the 2005 Mediterranean Games, fifth at the 2009 Mediterranean Games (all 1500 metres) and competed in the 800 metres at the 2010 European Championships without reaching the final.

Her personal best times are 2:01.54 minutes in the 800 metres, achieved in June 2009 in Huelva and 4:08.06 minutes in the 1500 metres, achieved in July 2009 in Athens.
