= Simone Chapoteau =

French athlete

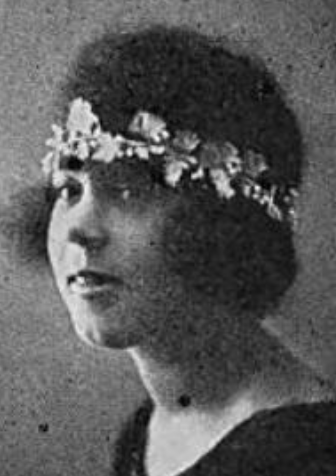
- Simone Chapoteau, from a 1922 publication
- Born: Marie-Josephine Alberte Simone Chapoteau; November 3, 1902; Port-au-Prince, Haiti
- Died: March 11, 1980 (aged 77); Paris, France
- Other names: Simonne Chapoteau, Simone Pierson
- Occupation: Athlete

Simone Chapoteau Pierson (November 3, 1902 – March 11, 1980) was a French athlete, born in Haiti. She won medals at women's track events in the 1920s and 1930s, including a gold medal at the Women's World Games in Monte Carlo in 1923, in pentathlon. She was president of the Cercle Féminin de Paris, a women's athletic organization, for 47 years.

== Early life and education ==
Chapoteau was born in Haiti and educated in France. Her sister Liliane was also involved in sports.

== Career ==
Chapoteau was a track-and-field athlete in the 1920s, competing in running, pentathlon, shotput, javelin, and long jump events in Paris and Monte Carlo. She was on several record-setting French relay teams, including a 1922 win with Andrée Darreau, Georgette Lenoir, and Cécile Maugars. She won a gold medal at the Women's World Games in Monte Carlo in 1923, in pentathlon. She won silver and bronze medals at the French national championships in Bry-sur-Marne in 1926, in Roubaix in 1927, and in Paris in 1928. She won several more medals in shotput at French national events in the 1930s. Chapoteau also played soccer and basketball, and she played golf in French tournaments. She was captain of the Fémina Sport soccer team from 1922 to 1924. In the 1940s, she was a member of the Nova Fémina soccer team with Carmen Pomiès.

In 1928, Chapoteau founded the Cercle féminin de Paris, an athletic club. She was president of the club for 47 years.

== Personal life ==
Chapoteau died in 1980, in Paris, at the age of 77.
