= Natalie Lewis =

Welsh middle-distance runner

Natalie Benjamin-Lewis (born 25 May 1982) is a Welsh middle distance athlete from Cardiff, Wales. She specialises in the 1500 metres. She has represented Wales at the Commonwealth Games in Manchester 2002 and Melbourne 2006. She won the Amateur Athletic Association's indoor title over 1500 m in 2002.

Lewis married Welsh sprinter Timothy Benjamin in November 2007.

== Personal bests ==
Event	Best	Location	Date
1500 metres (outdoor)	4:14.00 min	Manchester, England	11 July 2004
1500 metres (indoor)	4:16.89 min	Cardiff, Wales	16 February 2005

- All information taken from IAAF profile.
