= Fatima Yvelain =

French long-distance runner

Personal information
- Born: 31 December 1969 (age 56) Khemisset, Morocco
- Height: 1.65 m (5 ft 5 in)

Sport
- Sport: Long-distance running
- Events: 1500–10,000 metres, marathon

Fatima Yvelain, née Maama (born 31 December 1969) is a Moroccan-born French runner. She began as a middle-distance and long-distance runner on the track, later also competing in road running up to the marathon distance.

== Track career ==
She was born in Khemisset. She finished eighth in the 3000 metres at the 1988 World Junior Championships. At the 1989 Jeux de la Francophonie she won the bronze medal in the 800 metres and finished fourth in the 1500 metres. She won silver medals in both events at the 1989 Arab Championships.

Becoming a French citizen, she took her first French championship title in 1999 in the 5000 metres, followed by participation at the 1999 World Championships and a sixth place at the ISTAF Berlin meet.

2000 was a busy season, starting with a French indoor title and an eighth place at the 2000 European Indoor Championships (both 3000 metres). She among others finished second at the 2000 European 10,000m Challenge, eighth at the Meeting Gaz de France (3000 m), fourth at the 2000 European Cup Super League (1500 m), second and first at the French Championships (1500 and 5000 m), thirteenth at the Weltklasse Zürich and eighth at the Herculis meet (both 3000 m), eighth at the ISTAF (5000 m) and competing at the 2000 Olympic Games (10,000 m) without reaching the final.

Yvelain's third back-to-back French 5000 metres gold came in 2001, as well as a third place at the 2001 European Cup Super League (3000 m) and a fourteenth place at the 2001 World Championships (5000 m).

Her fourth national 5000 metres title in 2002 was accompanied by her first French 10,000 metres victory. In the latter event she finished eighteenth at the 2002 European Championships; she also entered the Paris Marathon finishing 21st. In the somewhat shorter distances she finished third at the 2002 European Cup Super League (5000 m) and thirteenth at the Herculis (3000 m).

By 2003 she switched more over to the longest distances, finishing ninth at the Paris Marathon, winning the Setúbal Half Marathon and the French 10 kilometres championships, and 34th at the 2003 World Championships in Paris. She also finished eighth at the 2006 Paris Marathon and 28th at the 2006 European Championships marathon.

== Cross-country running ==
She competed at her first World Cross Country Championships in 1986, finishing a lowly 126th. She also competed in 1987 and 1990.

After becoming a French citizen, she finished thirteenth at the 1997 European Cross Country Championships, 62nd at the 1998 World Cross Country Championships, tenth at the 1998 European Cross Country Championships, ninth at the 1999 World Cross Country Championships, eighth at the 1999 European Cross Country Championships, fifth at the 2000 World Cross Country Championships, 43rd at the 2001 World Cross Country Championships, 16th at the 2001 European Cross Country Championships, 44th at the 2002 World Cross Country Championships, 50th at the 2004 World Cross Country Championships, 41st at the 2005 World Cross Country Championships, 30th at the 2009 European Cross Country Championships and 42nd at the 2010 World Cross Country Championships.

== Doping ==
In 1999, Yvelain sued fellow runner Blandine Bitzner-Ducret for defamation, Bitzner-Ducret having voiced accusations that Yvelain violated doping rules.

At the 2012 Perpignan Half Marathon, Yvelain tested positive for EPO and was banned for two years. According to Marianne, the excuse for testing positive was "the most ludicrous" of all time: With rain having fallen in the city, rainwater that became contaminated with EPO from hospital waste splashed on the runners, soaked their underwear whereupon it entered Yvelain's body.
