= Emmanuel Roudolff-Levisse =

French long-distance runner

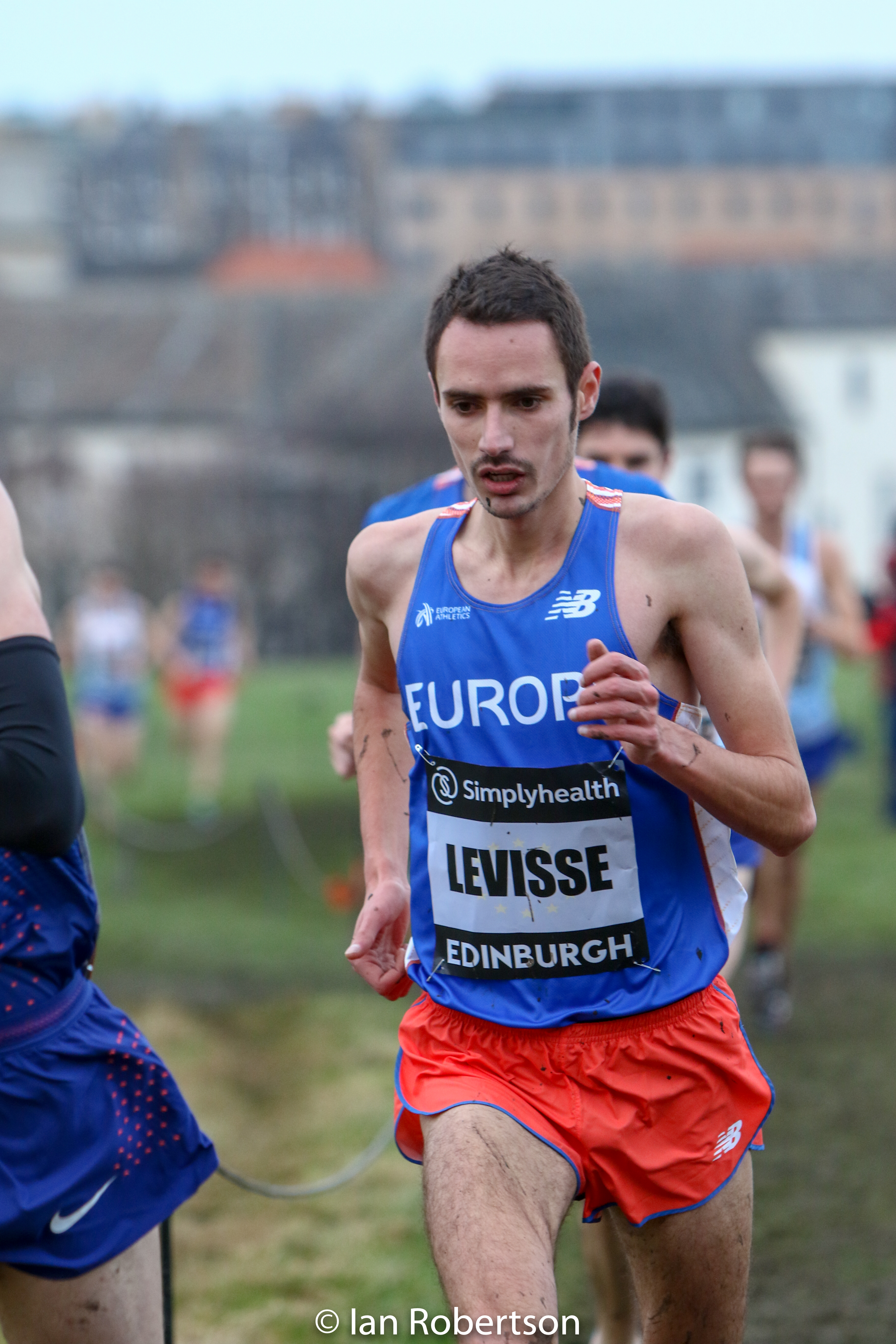
- Great Edinburgh International Cross Country 2018

Personal information
- Born: 30 July 1995 (age 31) La Teste-de-Buch, France
- Height: 179 cm (5 ft 10 in)
- Weight: 60 kg (132 lb)

Sport
- Country: France
- Sport: Athletics
- Events: Long-distance running Cross country running

Achievements and titles
- Personal bests: Half Marathon: 59:37 (Barcelona 2026); Marathon: 2:05:58 (Paris 2026)
Medal record
Men's long-distance running
Representing France
European Championships
Bronze medal – third place	2026 Birmingham	Marathon team
European U23 Championships
Bronze medal – third place	2017 Bydgoszcz	10,000 m

Emmanuel Roudolff-Levisse (born 30 July 1995) is a French long-distance and cross country runner. He has won French national titles in cross country as well as over 10,000 metres and in the half marathon. Competing in the marathon distance he won a team bronze medal at the 2026 European Athletics Championships.

== Biography ==
The son of French long-distance runner Pierre Levisse, he is a graduate of the University of Portland in the United States. He won the French 10,000m title in 2017 and that year placed third in Bydgoszcz at the 2017 European Athletics U23 Championships over that distance. In 2019, he became the French cross-country champion in Vittel.

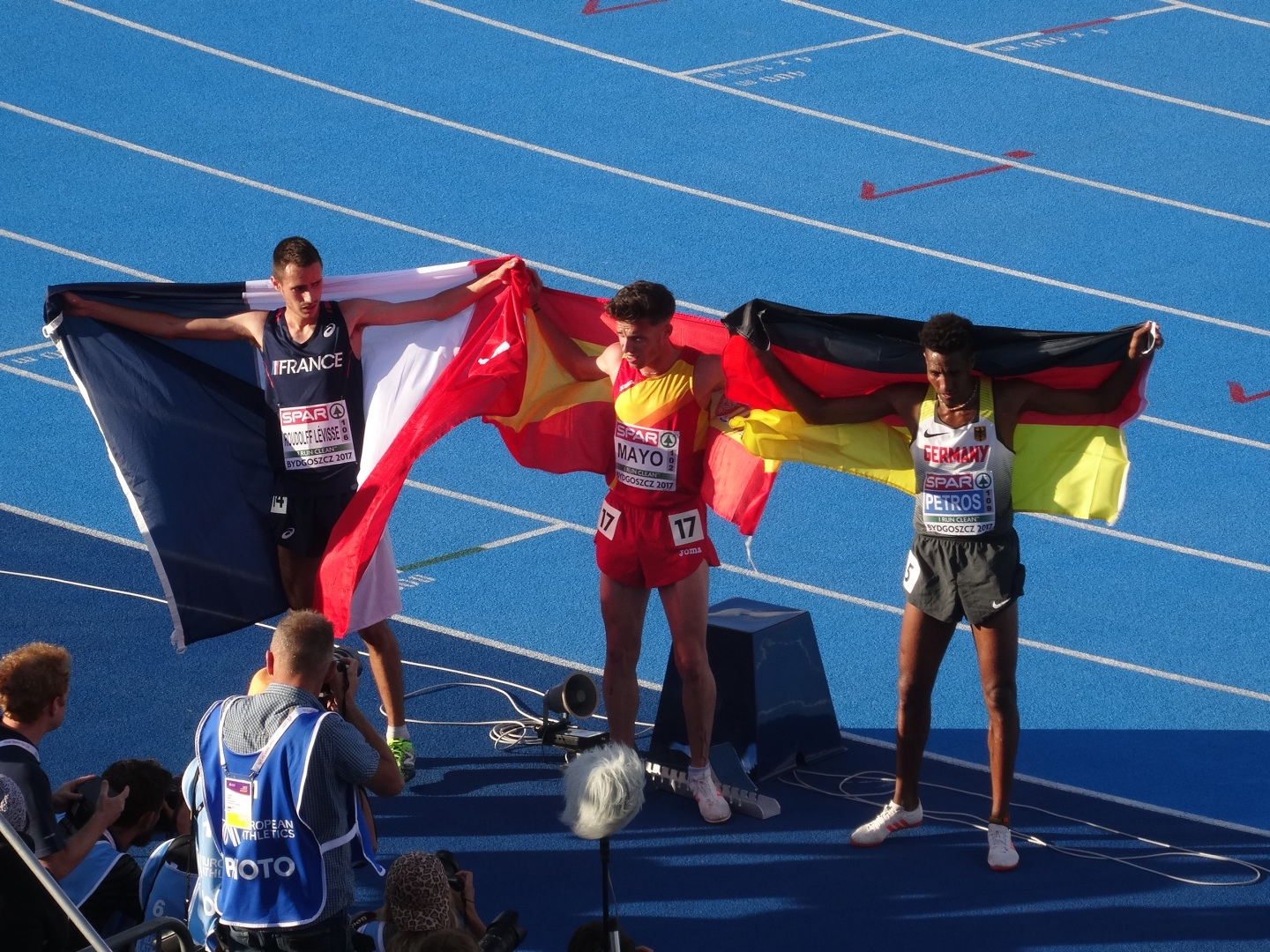
Roudolff-Levisse (left) in 2017

In March 2024, he represented France at the 2024 World Athletics Cross Country Championships in Belgrade. In September 2025, he won French Half Marathon Championships in Vannes. The following month, he finished second in 56:32 behind Etienne Daguinos at the Paris 20km.

In January 2026, he won the Seville Half Marathon in 60:24. The following month at the Barcelona Half Marathon, Roudolff-Levisse placed third in 59:37 and broke the French record held by Morhad Amdouni by three seconds to become the seventh fastest European in history at the distance. On 12 April, he ran a personal best 2:05:58 to place sixth overall at the 2026 Paris Marathon. On 16 August, he finished in eleventh place with a time of 2:10:34 in the marathon at the 2026 European Championships in Birmingham, which helped France win the team bronze medal.

== Personal life ==
Alongside his athletics career, he works as a municipal police officer in the Paris region.
