= Emily Pidgeon =

British runner (born 1989)

Emily Pidgeon born 1 June 1989 in Cheltenham, to parents Stephen and Jessica, is a former UK athlete, specialising in long and middle distance events.

== Junior career ==
Considered an athletics prodigy as a junior, she is a former 5000 metres European Junior Champion (2005). She was bronze medallist in the 2007 European Junior Championships in Hengelo. In December 2006, Pidgeon, the 2005 silver-medalist at the European JuniCross Country Championships, was in the victorious junior female team at the European Cross Country Championships. She finished fourth individually behind fellow Briton, Stephanie Twell. Pidgeon held the world record for 5000 meters for 14-year-old girls with a time of 16:24.28. It was broken in 2023 by Sophia Rodriguez of the United States of America with a time of 16:22.30.

== Senior career ==
At the World Cross Country Championships in Mombasa on 24 March 2007, Pidgeon finished 17th; the second British runner and the second European. The Great Britain & NI team finished 5th; the top European team.

Pidgeon and her coach controversially withdrew from a number of events because of disagreements with UK Athletics over training

Having failed to qualify for the 2012 Summer Olympics, and dogged by injury and form issues since leaving the junior ranks, Pidgeon announced her retirement from the sport, at the age of 24, in January 2014.

== Personal bests ==
Source: IAAF

- 1500 Metres 4:17.83 Solihull 25 June 2005
- One Mile 4:50.68 Oxford 6 May 2004
- 3000 Metres 9:06.87 Twickenham 7 June 2006
- 5000 Metres 15:41.00 Solihull 24 June 2006
- 10 Kilometres 34:28 Bourton-on-the-Water 20 February 2005
- 2000 Metres Steeplechase 6:37.76 Altitude Potchefstroom 24 April 2006
- 3000 Metres Steeplechase 10:06.12 Bedford 3 July 2005
