= Petit Port racecourse =

Racecourse in Nantes, Loire-Atlantique, France

- Interactive map of Petit Port racecourse
- Location: Nantes, Loire-Atlantique, France
- Coordinates: 47.248°N 1.564°W
- Owned by: Société des Courses de Nantes
- Date opened: 1875
- Capacity: 5,350

The Petit Port racecourse is a racecourse in Nantes, Loire-Atlantique, France, in the Nantes Nord district. The racecourse was inaugurated in 1875. It is 35-hectares large, open to gallop on a 2,065-meter grass track and to trot on a 1,411-meter pozzolan track. Grandstands were built in 1972 and can accommodate 5,000 people. They are equipped with a panoramic restaurant with a capacity of 350 persons.

== History ==
On 11 May 1875, the city of Nantes purchased 35 hectares of ground in order to build a race track and, according to an agreement with the army, a shooting range and parade ground. The first one was located on the island of Prairie-au-Duc (after being located on la prairie de Mauves close to Nantes railway station) and was too close to the "ponts de la Vendée" which were in construction. The detonation sounds made by the extractions of the rocks on Saint-Sébastien-Sur-Loire's buttress, necessary to the construction of the bridge, frightened the officers' horses.
