= Rodica Nagel =

French-Romaian female long-distance runner

Personal information
- Full name: Rodica Daniela Nagel
- Born: Rodica Daniela Moroianu; 18 November 1970 (age 55) Mihăilești, Romania
- Height: 170 cm (5 ft 7 in)
- Weight: 50 kg (110 lb)

Sport
- Country: Romania (until 1997); France (since 1997)
- Sport: Athletics (track and field)
Medal record
Women's athletics
Representing France
IAAF World Cross Country Championships
Bronze medal – third place	2001 Ostend	Senior team

Rodica Daniela Nagel (née Moroianu, born 18 November 1970) is a French-Romanian former long-distance runner who competed in distances from 3000 metres to the half marathon. She was active from 1987 to 2007. She competed for her native Romania until June 1997, after which point she competed for her adopted nation, France.

She competed at six editions of the IAAF World Cross Country Championships and also ran at the 1999 IAAF World Indoor Championships and the 2002 IAAF World Half Marathon Championships. She was a team bronze medallist at the 2001 IAAF World Cross Country Championships with France. Her highest individual placing, seventh, came in the short race of the 1998 edition. Her sole international individual medal was a silver in the 5000 metres at the 1997 Francophonie Games.

She was twice a champion at the French Cross Country Championships, winning the short race in 1998 and the long race in 2002. In her road running career she had wins at the Humarathon 10K in 1997 and Giro di Castelbuono in 2001.

== International competitions ==
Year	Competition	Venue	Position	Event	Notes
1993	World Cross Country Championships	Amorebieta, Spain	81st	Senior race	21:34
1993	World Cross Country Championships	Amorebieta, Spain	9th	Senior team	157 pts
1997	Jeux de la Francophonie	Antananarivo, Madagascar	2nd	5000 m	17:04.5
1998	World Cross Country Championships	Marrakesh, Morocco	7th	Short race	12:48
1999	World Indoor Championships	Maebashi, Japan	—	3000 m	DNF
1999	World Cross Country Championships	Belfast, United Kingdom	46th	Short race	16:38
2001	World Cross Country Championships	Ostend, Belgium	24th	Women's race	30:00
2001	World Cross Country Championships	Ostend, Belgium	3rd	Senior team	77 pts
2002	World Cross Country Championships	Dublin, Ireland	29th	Senior race	28:30
2002	World Cross Country Championships	Dublin, Ireland	8th	Senior team	121 pts
2002	World Half Marathon Championships	Brussels, Belgium	46th	Half marathon	1:14:49
2002	World Half Marathon Championships	Brussels, Belgium	9th	Team	3:46:49
2005	World Cross Country Championships	Saint-Galmier, France	35th	Short race	14:24
2005	World Cross Country Championships	Saint-Galmier, France	8th	Short team	182 pts

== National titles ==
- French Cross Country Championships
  - Long race: 2002
  - Short race: 1998
