= Pierre Lévisse =

French long-distance runner

Personal information
- Nationality: French
- Born: 21 February 1952 (age 74)

Sport
- Sport: Long-distance running
- Event: 10,000 metres

Pierre Lévisse (born 21 February 1952) is a French long-distance runner. He competed in the men's 10,000 metres at the 1976 Summer Olympics. His son Emmanuel Roudolff-Lévisse is also a long-distance runner.
