= Banuelia Mrashani =

Tanzanian long-distance runner

Personal information
- Nationality: Tanzanian
- Born: 14 November 1977 (age 48)

Sport
- Sport: Long-distance running
- Event: Marathon

Banuelia Mrashani-Katesigwa (born 14 November 1977) is a Tanzanian long-distance runner. She competed in the women's marathon at the 2004 Summer Olympics.
