= 2001 European Cross Country Championships =

Coordinates: 46°45′29″N 7°36′26″E

- Organisers: EAA
- Edition: 8th
- Date: 9 December
- Host city: Thun, Switzerland
- Events: 4
- Distances: 9.15 km – Men; 4.65 km – Women; 6.15 km – Junior men 3.15 km – Junior women

The 8th European Cross Country Championships were held at Thun in Switzerland on 9 December 2001. Serhiy Lebid took his second title in the men's competition and Yamna Belkacem won the women's race.

== Results ==
=== Men individual 9.15 km ===
Pos.	Runners	Time
1st place, gold medalist(s)	(Ukraine) Serhiy Lebid	27:52
2nd place, silver medalist(s)	(Netherlands) Kamiel Maase	28:05
3rd place, bronze medalist(s)	(Spain) Antonio David Jiménez	28:10
4.	(Italy) Gabriele De Nard	28:11
5.	(Switzerland) Christian Belz	28:12
6.	(United Kingdom) Sam Haughian	28:12
7.	(Spain) José Carlos Adán	28:13
8.	(France) Mustapha El Ahmadi	28:13
9.	(Sweden) Claes Nyberg	28:14
10.	(Portugal) Paulo Guerra	28:15
11.	(France) Augusto Gomes	28:17
12.	(Spain) José Manuel García	28:18

Total 77 competitors

=== Men teams ===
Pos.	Team	Points
1st place, gold medalist(s)	Spain; Antonio David Jiménez; José Carlos Adán; José Manuel García; Alejandro Gómez	40
2nd place, silver medalist(s)	France	50
3rd place, bronze medalist(s)	Portugal	72
4.	Italy	74
5.	United Kingdom	92
6.	Belgium	135
7.	Netherlands	143
8.	Russia	160

Total 12 teams

=== Women individual 4.65 km ===
Pos.	Runners	Time
1st place, gold medalist(s)	(France) Yamna Belkacem	15:48
2nd place, silver medalist(s)	(Russia) Olga Romanova	15:49
3rd place, bronze medalist(s)	(Poland) Justyna Bąk	15:51
4.	(Serbia and Montenegro) Olivera Jevtić	15:52
5.	(United Kingdom) Liz Yelling	15:55
6.	(Portugal) Helena Sampaio	15:55
7.	(Portugal) Inês Monteiro	15:56
8.	(United Kingdom) Hayley Yelling	15:58
9.	(Russia) Anastasiya Zubova	16:01
10.	(Portugal) Analídia Torre	16:03
11.	(Romania) Mihaela Botezan	16:05
12.	(United Kingdom) Kathy Butler	16:08

Total 84 competitors

=== Women teams ===
Pos.	Team	Points
1st place, gold medalist(s)	Portugal; Helena Sampaio; Inês Monteiro; Analídia Torre; Ana Dias	41
2nd place, silver medalist(s)	United Kingdom	49
3rd place, bronze medalist(s)	France	66
4.	Russia	71
5.	Ireland	116
6.	Romania	137
7.	Spain	138
8.	Hungary	140

Total 13 teams

=== Junior men individual 6.15 km ===
Pos.	Runners	Time
1st place, gold medalist(s)	(Ukraine) Vasyl Matviychuk	19:29
2nd place, silver medalist(s)	(United Kingdom) Mo Farah	19:38
3rd place, bronze medalist(s)	(Italy) Stefano Scaini	19:39
4.	(Romania) Mircea Bogdan	19:39
5.	(Romania) Cosmin Suteu	19:43
6.	(United Kingdom) Adam Bowden	19:43
7.	(Portugal) Bruno Saramago	19:44
8.	(France) Jeremy Pierrat	19:45

Total 90 competitors

=== Junior men teams ===
Pos.	Team	Points
1st place, gold medalist(s)	United Kingdom; Mo Farah; Adam Bowden; Matthew Bowser; Andrew Lemoncello	54
2nd place, silver medalist(s)	Portugal	67
3rd place, bronze medalist(s)	France	68
4.	Italy	79
5.	Spain	98
6.	Ireland	118
7.	Belgium	140
8.	Belarus	147

Total 13 teams

=== Junior women individual 3.15 km ===
Pos.	Runners	Time
1st place, gold medalist(s)	(Turkey) Elvan Abeylegesse	10:35
2nd place, silver medalist(s)	(Russia) Tatyana Chulakh	10:53
3rd place, bronze medalist(s)	(Socialist Federal Republic of Yugoslavia) Snezana Kostic	10:54
4.	(Russia) Inga Abitova	11:02
5.	(United Kingdom) Charlotte Dale	11:07
6.	(Belgium) Mieke Geens	11:09
7.	(Turkey) Türkan Erismis	11:11
8.	(Finland) Elina Lindgren	11:11

Total 84 competitors

=== Junior women teams ===
Pos.	Team	Points
1st place, gold medalist(s)	Russia; Tatyana Chulakh; Inga Abitova; Marina Ivanova; Tatyana Petrova	35
2nd place, silver medalist(s)	United Kingdom	54
3rd place, bronze medalist(s)	Turkey	79
4.	Finland	96
5.	France	115
6.	Spain	129
7.	Germany	147
8.	Romania	154

Total 15 teams
