= Lucie Cadiès =

French middle-distance runner

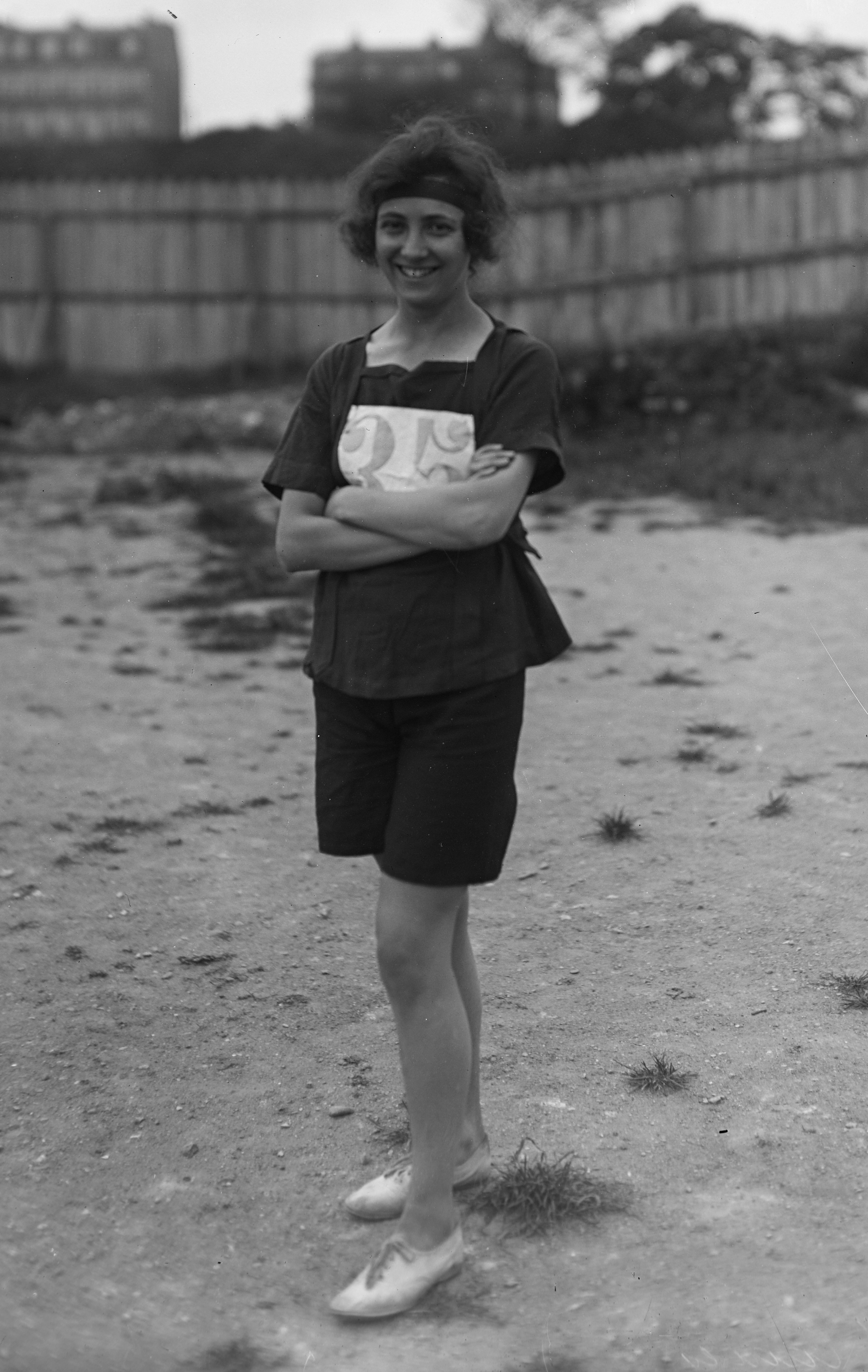
- Lucie Cadiès in 1920.

Personal information
- Nationality: French
- Born: 1898 Ville
- Years active: 1917-1920

Sport
- Event: middle distance running
- Club: Fémina Sport

Lucie Cadiès (married name was Verdy) (born 1898) was a French athlete, who specialized in the middle distance races. Champion of France in the 1,000 m in 1918, she beat the World record in the 1000 meters. Her record is not yet recognized as such by the International Association of Athletics Federations which began to ratify female records for the 1 000 meters in 1922 with the time of Georgette Lenoir.

== Biography ==
=== Records ===
Personal Bests
Event	Performance	Location	Date
800 meters	2 min 53 s 4		1921
1000 meters	3 min 30 s 6 (NR)		1921
1500 meters	5 min 54 s 6 (NR)		1918
