= Sophie Duarte =

French runner (born 1981)

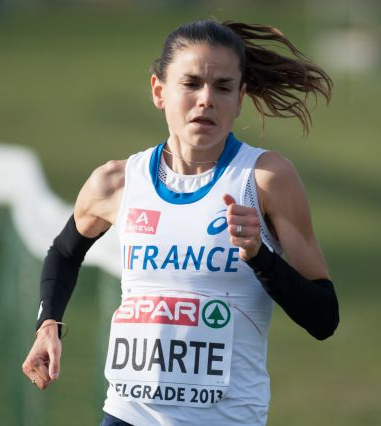
- Duarte at the 2013 European Cross Country Championships

Personal information
- Nationality: French
- Born: 31 July 1981 (age 44) Rodez, France
- Height: 1.70 m (5 ft 7 in)
- Weight: 54 kg (119 lb)

Sport
- Sport: Athletics
- Event(s): 3000 metres steeplechase, cross country
- Club: SATUC (2003); Olympique de Marseille Athlétisme (2004–2005); AES Nanterre (2006); Alès Cévennes Athlétisme (2007); CP Joinville (2008–2010); CA Balma (2010–).
- Coached by: David Heath
Medal record
Representing France
European Cross Country Championships
Gold medal – first place	2013 Belgrade	Individual
Silver medal – second place	2013 Belgrade	Team

Sophie Duarte (born 31 July 1981) is a French runner who specializes in the 3000 metres steeplechase. She placed fifth at the 2007 World Championships, setting a French record, and won the individual gold medal at 2013 European Cross Country Championships.

== Biography ==
In 2007 Duarte was included into the French national team and placed fifth at the world championships, beating her own French record by 2 seconds. She participated in the 3000 m steeplechase at the 2008 Summer Olympics and finished 7th in the heats. On 10 July 2009, she bettered her French record running 9:25.62 at the Golden Gala meet in Rome. Qualifying for the 2009 World Championships in Berlin, she finished initially 15th in the final. On 19 November 2015, the Spaniard Marta Dominguez, who initially won the championship at these Games, was disqualified for doping. Duarte was reclassified in 14th position

In 2010, Duarte placed seventh at the European Championships in Barcelona. She did not run at the London 2012 Olympics due to an injury. Since 2013 she has been trained by David Heath, a former English international, in cross country.

Duarte established a new personal best over 5000 m running 15:14 at the meeting of Areva de Paris, and qualified for the 2013 World Championships in Moscow. The same year she ran her first Cross Country Championship where she placed 16th, 2nd among Europeans. Several months later, she won the European Cross Country championship. In 2014, she set a new personal record at the 10 km running 31:53 and qualified in the 10000 m for the European Championships in Zurich.

== Results ==
=== World Championships ===
- 2007 World Championships in Athletics at Osaka
  - 5th 3 000 m steeplechase
- 2009 World Championships in Athletics at Berlin
  - 14th 3 000 m steeplechase
- 2013 IAAF World Cross Country Championships at Bydgoszcz
  - 16th at 8 000 m

=== European Championships ===
- 2010 European Athletics Championships at Barcelona
  - 7th at 3 000 m steeplechase
- 6th at the 2011 European Cross Country Championships at Velenje
- 6th at the 2012 European Cross Country Championships at Szentendre
- (gold) 1st at the 2013 European Cross Country Championships at Belgrade
- 5th at the 2014 European Cross Country Championships at Samokov

=== European Cup ===
- 2007 European Cup: 2nd in the 3000 m steeplechase

=== National ===
- Champion of France at long course of cross country in 2015
- Vice-champion of France at long course of cross country in 2014
- 3rd at the championship of France at long course of cross country in 2011, 2012, 2013 and 2016

== Personal bests ==
- 5000 m: 15:14 in 2013
- 10 km: 31:53
- 3000 m steeplechase: 9:25.62 (record of France) at the Golden Gala of Rome on 10 July 2009
- 2000 m steeplechase: 6:46.29 (Under 23s) at Ashford on 2 August 2003
- 1500 m: 4:13.60 at Tomblaine (meeting of Nancy) on 26 June 2009
