= Claire Perraux =

French middle-distance runner

Claire Navez (born 6 October 1987 at Niort) Is a French athlete specializing in the middle distances, running for club SCO sainte-marguerite Marseille.

== Biography ==
She won four times the title of champion of France on the short cross (Cross Country long race) between 2011 and 2015.

During the Indoor Athletics Championships in France in 2012, Claire Navez imposed herself on the 1500 meters, running 4 min 22 sec 71, later in the season, she became champion of France at the 3000 meter steeplechase.

She married Bastien Perraux in September 2012 and therefore appears later in the balances under the name Claire Perraux.

== Prize list ==
- Champion of France of cross court (Cross Country long race) in 2011, 2012, 2013 and 2015
- France champion in 1500m Indoors in 2012 and 2015
- Champion of France 3000 m steeplechase in 2012
- Vice-champion of France of the cross court (Cross Country long race) in 2008
- 3rd in French championship cross court (Cross Country long race) in 2016

=== Records ===
Personal Bests
Event	Performance	Location	Date
800 m	2 min 06 s 64	Albertville	12 July 2010
1 500 m	4 min 12 s 21	Ninove	2 August 2014
3 000 m steeplechase	9 min 43 s 70	New York	25 May 2013
