= Nicole Goullieux =

French middle-distance runner (1931–2024)

Personal information
- Nationality: French
- Born: 15 July 1931 Paris, France
- Died: 19 June 2024 (aged 92) Le Neubourg, France
- Years active: 1952–1963
- Height: 1.61 m (5 ft 3 in)

Sport
- Event(s): 800m, cross country running
- Club: Racing Club de France
Medal record
Representing France
Summer Universiade
Gold medal – first place	1959 Turin	800m

Nicole Germaine Goullieux (15 July 1931 – 19 June 2024) was a French athlete, who had specialized in the 800 meters and in Cross Country.

== Biography ==
Goullieux was born in Paris. She won six titles at the French National 800m Championships in 1952, 1953, 1957, 1958, 1959 and 1962. She also won five French Cross Country Championships, between the years of 1956 to 1963. Goullieux improved the French 800 meters record three times, running 2:12.7 and 2:10.5 in 1955 and 2:09.5 in 1959.

In 1959, she won the gold medal in the 800 m during the Summer Universiade, at Turin in the time 2:11.1. She participated in the 1960 Olympics at Rome, but did not advance past the first round of the 800 m trials.

Goullieux died in Le Neubourg on 19 June 2024, at the age of 92.

=== Prize list ===
- French Championships in Athletics :
  - winner of the 800m 1952, 1953, 1957, 1958, 1959 and 1962.
- French Cross Country Championships :
  - winner in 1956, 1959, 1960, 1961 and 1963

=== Records ===
Personal Bests
Event	Performance	Location	Date
800 m	2:09.5		1959

== Sources ==
- Fédération Française d'Athlétisme, ed. (2003), Docathlé 2003, Fédération française d'athlétisme, pp. 40, 117, 176, 406, ISBN 2-9512343-3-3
