= Chantal Dällenbach =

French long-distance runner

Personal information
- Nationality: French
- Born: 24 October 1962 (age 63)

Sport
- Sport: Long-distance running
- Event: 10,000 metres

Chantal Dällenbach (born 24 October 1962) is a French long-distance runner. She competed in the women's 10,000 metres at the 1996 Summer Olympics.

She became Swiss marathon champion on 20 October 2003 in Lausanne.
