= Latifa Essarokh =

French middle-distance runner

Personal information
- Born: 11 December 1973 (age 52) Marrakesh, Morocco

Sport
- Sport: Track and field
- Event: 1500 metres

Latifa Essarokh (born 11 December 1973) is a French middle-distance runner. She competed in the women's 1500 metres event at the 2004 Summer Olympics.
