= Gentilly =

Gentilly may refer to:

== France ==
- Gentilly, Val-de-Marne, a commune of the Val-de-Marne département

== Canada ==
- Gentilly, Quebec, a suburb of the city of Bécancour
- Gentilly Nuclear Generating Station, a former nuclear power station in Bécancour, Quebec

== United States ==
- Gentilly, New Orleans, Louisiana, a neighborhood
- Gentilly Township, Minnesota
