= Michel Soalhat =

French athlete

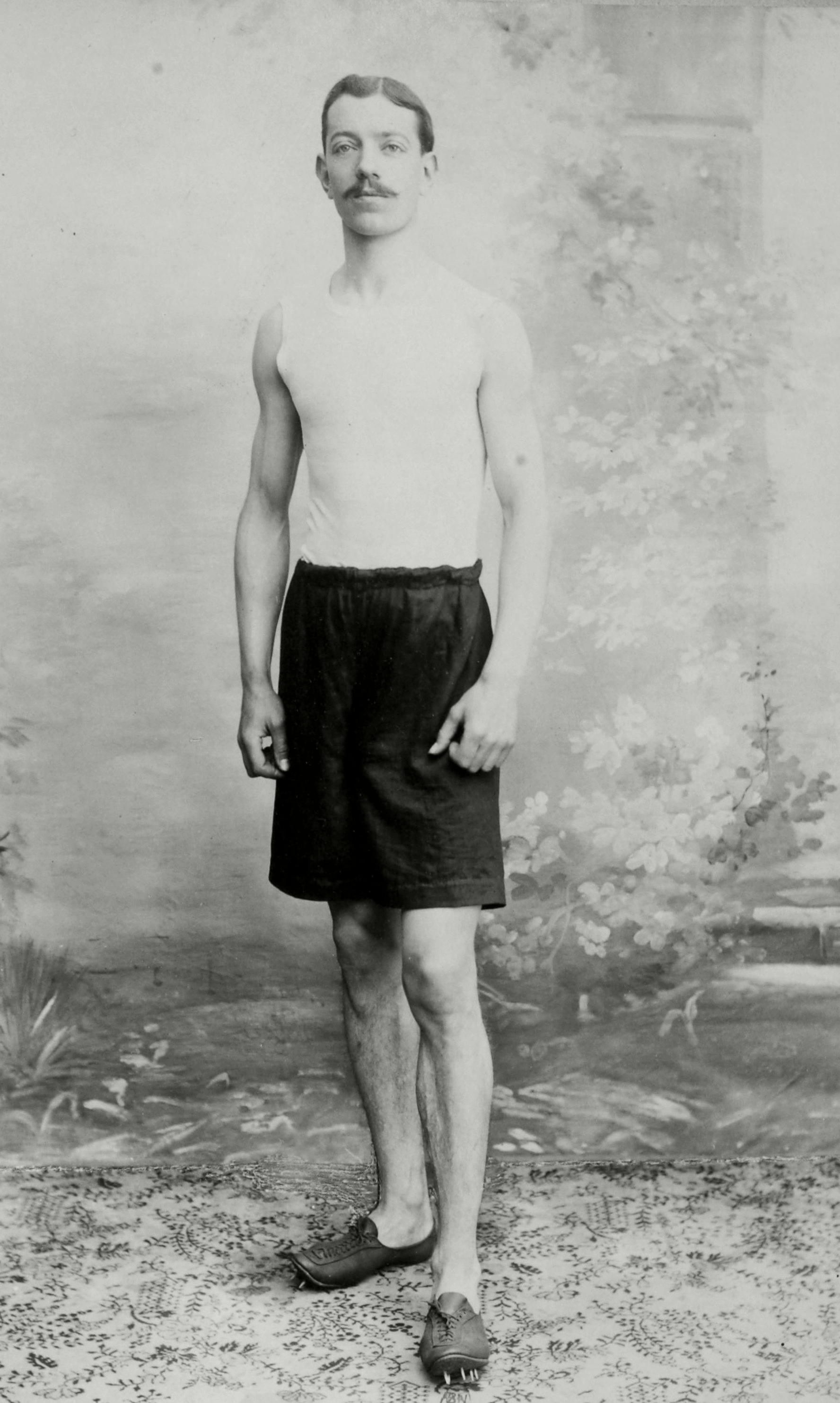
- Michel Soalhat

Personal information
- Birth name: Michel Léon Marie Soalhat
- Nationality: French
- Born: 17 November 1875; Clermont-Ferrand, France
- Died: 25 September 1915 (aged 39); Saint-Hilaire, France

Sport
- Sport: Athletics

Michel Léon Marie Soalhat (17 November 1875 – 25 September 1915) was a French athlete. He competed in three competitions at the 1906 Intercalated Games. He was killed in action during the First World War.

== Personal life ==
Soalhat enlisted in the French Army in 1896 and was placed in the reserves two years later, but was recalled to the Army upon the outbreak of the First World War. Serving as a private second class, he was killed in action at Saint-Hilaire-le-Grand during the Second Battle of Champagne in 1915.
