= Khalid Zoubaa =

French long-distance runner

Khalid Zoubaa ( born 27 April 1977 in Sète, Hérault) is a French long-distance runner.

He finished fifth in the 5000 metres at the 2006 European Athletics Championships and sixth at the 2006 IAAF World Cup.

His personal best time is 13:11.97 minutes, achieved in June 2006 in Huelva.

== Doping ==
Zoubaa tested positive for EPO on 27 January 2007 and was subsequently handed a 3-year ban from sports.
