= Laura Miclo =

French athlete

Personal information
- Nationality: French
- Born: 23 May 1988 (age 37) Saint-Dié-des-Vosges
- Years active: 2004-2014
- Height: 1.71 m (5 ft 7 in)
- Weight: 53 kg (117 lb)

Sport
- Event(s): 800 m, 1500 m, cross-country
- Club: Athlétique Sport Aixois
- Coached by: Michel Magron (2004-2008); Laurent Gobert (2008-2012)/ Robert Bogey (2012/....)

Laura Miclo (born 23 May 1988 at Saint-Die-des-Vosges) is a French athlete, who specializes in middle distances and cross-country.

She began competing in 2004 for the Athletic Club of Upper Meurthe.

Her best performance is a national Cross Country title in the short course won on 7 March 2010 at La Roche-sur-Yon. The following two years were injury-filled, marked by three stress fractures. She tried in spite of all to compete in the Duathlon.

At the end of 2012, she joined the Athletic sport aixois which enabled her to reconcile competition with her profession of radiology.

== Prize list ==
- 2014
  - French Cross Country championship—long course : silver medal.
- 2013
  - French Cross Country championship—long course: bronze medal.
- 2010
  - Record Lorraine U23s 800m : 2:05.37
  - Cross Country Champion of France—long course in 10:35
  - 3rd 1,500 meters in the Indoors championships of France 4:18.74 (record for Lorraine region).
  - university Indoor champion of France for the 800m.
- 2009
  - Cross Country European Championships : 28th U23s (Bronze Medal Team)
  - European Championships 1500 m U23s : final 10th (heats 5th)
  - Champion of France U23s 800m
  - Vice-champion of France U23s 800m indoor
  - Record for Lorraine region U23s 1500m : 4:15.03
  - Lorraine record U23 and senior for indoor 800m: 2:08.08
  - Lorraine record of U23s and senior 1500 m indoor: 4:20.67
- 2008
  - Cross Country European Championships : 22nd U23s
  - Vice-champion of France U23s 1500 m
- 2007
  - European Championships 800m junior : 9th
  - Junior Champion of France for 1500 m
  - Match Méditerranée featuring the countries ITA-ALG-ESP-FRA-TUN junior 1 500 m : 1st
- 2006
  - Vice-champion of France junior 800m
  - Vice-champion of France junior 800m indoor
