= Frantz Reichel =

French athlete

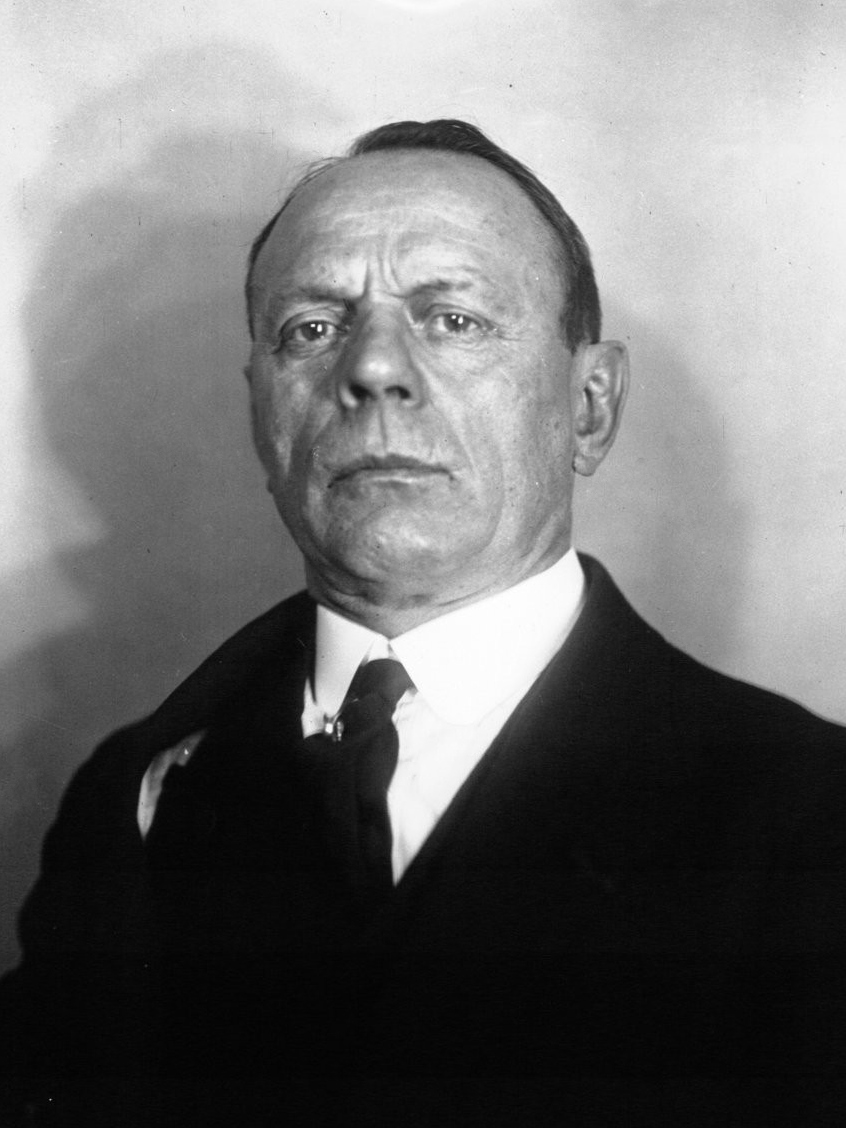
- Frantz Reichel in 1928

Personal information
- Born: 16 March 1871 Paris, France
- Died: 24 March 1932 (aged 61) Paris, France
- Height: 169 cm (5 ft 7 in)

Sport
- Sport: Rugby, sprint running
- Club: Racing Club de France, Paris
Medal record
Rugby union
Representing France
Olympic Games
Gold medal – first place	1900 Paris	Team competition

François Étienne "Frantz" Reichel (16 March 1871 – 24 March 1932) was a French sports administrator, athlete, cyclist and journalist. He competed at the 1896 Summer Olympics in Athens as a runner and at the 1900 Summer Olympics in Paris as a rugby union player. He co-founded the International Sports Press Association (AIPS), and served as its first president in 1924–1932.

== Biography ==
Reichel's father was the treasurer of the French Union of Athletic Sports Societies (USFSA) and the chief press officer at the 1894 Sorbonne Congress, where the Olympic Movement was founded. He later succeeded Pierre de Coubertin as secretary-general of the USFSA.

His son was a talented runner, who won French titles in the 110 m hurdles (1891), cross country (1890 and 1891) and 1 km walking. In 1892 he set a national record in one-hour run at 16.611 km. At the 1896 Olympics he failed to reach the 400 m final. It is unclear whether he placed second or third in the preliminary round of the 110 metres hurdles. He did not run in the final anyway, as he was busy assisting Albin Lermusiaux in conducting the marathon race. At those Games, besides running, Reichel also worked as a journalist for the French magazine Vélo.

At the 1900 Olympics Reichel competed in rugby and won a gold medal with the French team. He was later selected as the captain of the French rugby team in an international match in 1906. Reichel was a highly respected rugby player in France, and after his death a championship for young rugby players, Championnat Reichel, was established in his honour.

Later in life Reichel became a sports administrator and the secretary general of the USFSA. He also founded the French Boxing Federation and the Fédération Internationale de Hockey (FIH), serving as its president from 1926 to 1932. He was also a member of the French National Olympic and Sports Committee and headed the organizing committee of the 1924 Paris Olympics.

Reichel remained active as a journalist, and became the first European journalist to fly an airplane, assisting Wilbur Wright in his distance record for flights with a passenger. He co-founded the Association Internationale de la Presse Sportive (International Sports Press Association) and served as its first president from 1924 until his death in 1932.
