= Analídia Torre =

Portuguese long-distance runner

Analídia Torre (born 10 October 1976 in Portela Susa) is a retired Portuguese long-distance runner who specialized in cross-country running.

== International competitions ==
Year	Competition	Venue	Position	Notes
2001	World Cross Country Championships	Ostend, Belgium	16th	Long race
2001	World Cross Country Championships	Ostend, Belgium	5th	Team

== Personal bests ==
- 1500 metres - 4:15.61 min (2000)
- 3000 metres - 9:06.95 min (2001)
- 3000 metres steeplechase - 10:03.16 min (2002)
- 5000 metres - 15:35.51 min (2000)
- 10,000 metres - 33:50.17 min (2000)
- Half marathon - 1:17:48 hrs (2003)
