= 2009 European Athletics U23 Championships – Men's 5000 metres =

The men's 5000 metres event at the 2009 European Athletics U23 Championships was held in Kaunas, Lithuania, at S. Dariaus ir S. Girėno stadionas (Darius and Girėnas Stadium) on 16 July.

== Medalists ==
Gold	Mohamed Elbendir; Spain
Silver	Noureddine Smaïl; France
Bronze	David McCarthy; Ireland

== Results ==
=== Final ===
16 July

Rank	Name	Nationality	Time	Notes
1st place, gold medalist(s)	Mohamed Elbendir	Spain	13:55.10	
2nd place, silver medalist(s)	Noureddine Smaïl	France	13:59.23	
3rd place, bronze medalist(s)	David McCarthy	Ireland	14:00.78	
4	Abdi Nageeye	Netherlands	14:03.87	
5	Rico Schwarz	Germany	14:04.15	
6	Siarhei Chabiarak	Belarus	14:04.79	
7	Maksym Kryvonis	Ukraine	14:07.62	
8	Philipp Pflieger	Germany	14:09.13	
9	Selim Bayrak	Turkey	14:10.10	
10	Musa Roba-Kinkal	Germany	14:11.44	
11	Javier García	Spain	14:12.70	
12	Andrea Seppi	Italy	14:13.85	
13	Jonathan Taylor	United Kingdom	14:15.00	
14	Tom Wiggers	Netherlands	14:19.52	
15	Alexander Söderberg	Sweden	14:21.18	
16	Hassan Chahdi	France	14:21.76	
17	Sindre Buraas	Norway	14:25.83	
18	Matthieu Le Stum	France	14:31.44	
19	Lewis Timmins	United Kingdom	14:32.51	
20	Brendan O'Neill	Ireland	15:16.45	

== Participation ==
According to an unofficial count, 20 athletes from 12 countries participated in the event.

- Belarus (1)
- France (3)
- Germany (3)
- Ireland (2)
- Italy (1)
- Netherlands (2)
- Norway (1)
- Spain (2)
- Sweden (1)
- Turkey (1)
- Ukraine (1)
- United Kingdom (2)
