= Track and field at the 2011 Military World Games – Women's 800 metres =

Women's 800 meters race

The women's 800 metres event at the 2011 Military World Games was held on 19 and 20 July at the Estádio Olímpico João Havelange.

== Records ==
Prior to this competition, the existing world and CISM record were as follows:

World Record	Jarmila Kratochvílová (TCH)	1:53.28	Munich, West Germany	26 July 1983
CISM World Record	Natalya Dukhnova (BLR)	2:00.84	Zagreb, Croatia	August 1999

== Schedule ==
Date	Time	Round
19 July 2011	17:55	Semifinals
20 July 2011	17:15	Final

== Medalists ==
Gold	Silver	Bronze
Maryna Arzamasava; Belarus	Margarita Matsko; Kazakhstan	Hellen Obiri; Kenya

== Results ==
=== Final ===
Rank	Lane	Name	Nationality	Time	Notes
1st place, gold medalist(s)	6	Maryna Arzamasava	Belarus	2:01.39	
2nd place, silver medalist(s)	8	Margarita Matsko	Kazakhstan	2:01.83	
3rd place, bronze medalist(s)	3	Hellen Obiri	Kenya	2:01.86	
4	4	Élodie Guégan	France	2:01.98	
5	2	Christiane dos Santos	Brazil	2:02.08	
6	5	Viktoriya Yalovtseva	Kazakhstan	2:03.67	
7	7	Jane Jelagat	Kenya	2:06.98	
	1	Denise Krebs	Germany	DNF	
