= Noureddine Smaïl =

French distance runner

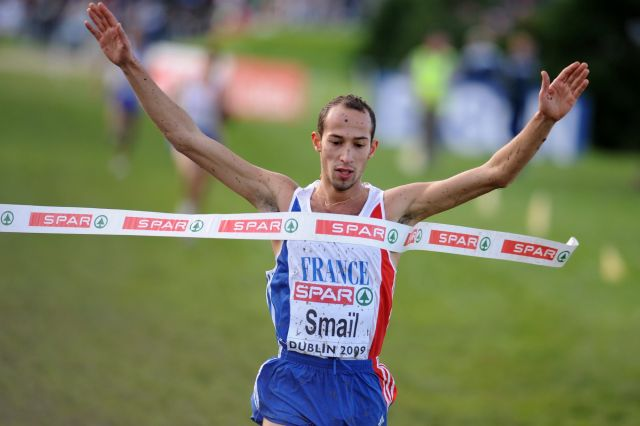
Smaïl winning at the 2009 European Cross Country Championships

Noureddine Smaïl (born 6 February 1987) is an Algerian-born French athlete who specialises in middle and long-distance tracks as well as cross country.

Born in Relizane, Algeria, Smaïl moved to France at a young age and began competing for his adopted country in 2006, taking part in the 2006 European Cross Country Championships (finishing 11th in the junior race), and the 2006 World Junior Championships in Athletics (reaching the 5000 m final). The 2007 season saw significant improvement as he took the 5000 m gold at the 2007 European Athletics U23 Championships. His progress stalled however in the following year, as he only managed 64th place in the U23 section of the 2008 European Cross Country Championships.

Smaïl enjoyed U23 success in 2009 as he won the 5000 m silver medal at the 2009 European Athletics U23 Championships and took the individual and team gold in the U23 race at the 2009 European Cross Country Championships. He also made progress in the senior ranks, reaching the 5000 m final at the 2009 European Team Championships and competing in his first major European senior championships: the 2009 European Athletics Indoor Championships.

== Personal bests ==
- 800 m : 1:54.56 (2004)
- 1000 m : 2:24.33 (2007)
- 1500 m : 3:47.6 (2006)
- 3000 m : 7:53.34 (2009)
- 5000 m : 13:38.22 (2008)
- 10 km : 32:38 (2005)
- 10 km : 28:56.57 (2014) track
- 3000 m steeplechase : 9:01.96 (2006)

== Competition record ==
| Year | Competition | Venue | Position | Event | Notes |
Representing France
| 2006 | World Junior Championships | Beijing, China | 8th | 5000 m | 14:06.86 |
| 2007 | European Athletics U23 Championships | Debrecen, Hungary | 1st | 5000 m | 13:53.15 |
| 2009 | European Indoor Championships | Turin, Italy | 14th (h) | 3000 m | 8:07.17 |
| 2009 | European Athletics U23 Championships | Kaunas, Lithuania | 2nd | 5000 m | 13:59.23 |
| 2009 | European Cross Country Championships | Dublin, Ireland | 1st | U23 Individual | 25:11 |
| 2009 | European Cross Country Championships | Dublin, Ireland | 1st | U23 team | N/A |
| 2009 | Jeux de la Francophonie | Beirut, Lebanon | 9th | 1500 m | 3:56.71 |
| 2010 | European Championships | Barcelona, Spain | 5th | 5000 m | 13:38.70 |

- He is also a two-time French champion in the 5000 m
