= Iván Fernández (athlete) =

Spanish long-distance runner (born 1988)

Ivan Fernández
Personal information
- Full name: Ivan Fernández Anaya
- Nationality: Spanish
- Born: 10 June 1988 (age 38) Vitoria, Spain

Sport
- Sport: Track and field
- Event(s): Long-distance running, Marathon
- Club: C.A.El Prado
- Coached by: Martín Fiz, Santi Pérez

Iván Fernández Anaya (born 10 June 1988) is a Spanish athlete who competes for Spain internationally.

He competes in long-distance running events, mostly cross country and marathon and has been coached by Martín Fiz, and Santi Pérez. A video went viral in January 2013 capturing the moment when Fernández realized that Abel Mutai had misunderstood the signage, and shoved him forward towards the finish line at the Burlada Cross Country race, rather than passing Mutai and winning the race himself. He was globally praised for his sportsmanship.

== Competition record ==
| Year | Competition | Venue | Position | Event | Notes |
Representing Spain
| 2005 | Youth Summer Olympic Festival | Lignano Sabbiadoro, Italy | 6th | 2000 m steeplechase | 6:08.25 |
| 2005 | World Youth Championships | Marrakesh, Morocco | 13th (h) | 2000 m steeplechase | 6:29.77 |
| 2009 | European U23 Championships | Kaunas, Lithuania | 5th | 10.000 m | 30:37.77 |
| 2014 | Ibero-American Championships | São Paulo, Brazil | 3rd | 5000 m | 13:59.61 |
| 2016 | European Athletics Championships | Amsterdam, Netherlands | 72nd | Half marathon | 1:09:38 |
| 2017 | World Championships | London, United Kingdom | - | Marathon | DNF |

== Personal bests ==
Outdoor

- 5000 metres – 13:36.64 (2013)
- 10.000 metres – 28:51.41 (2014)
- 10 kilometres – 29:22 (2020)
- Half marathon – 1:03:04 (2020)
- Marathon – 2:09:55 (2020)
- 2000 metres steeplechase – 5:55.50 (2005)
- 3000 metres steeplechase – 9:05.00 (2006)

== See also ==
- Shuhei Nishida
- Sueo Ōe
