= Abdi Nageeye =

Somali-Dutch long-distance runner

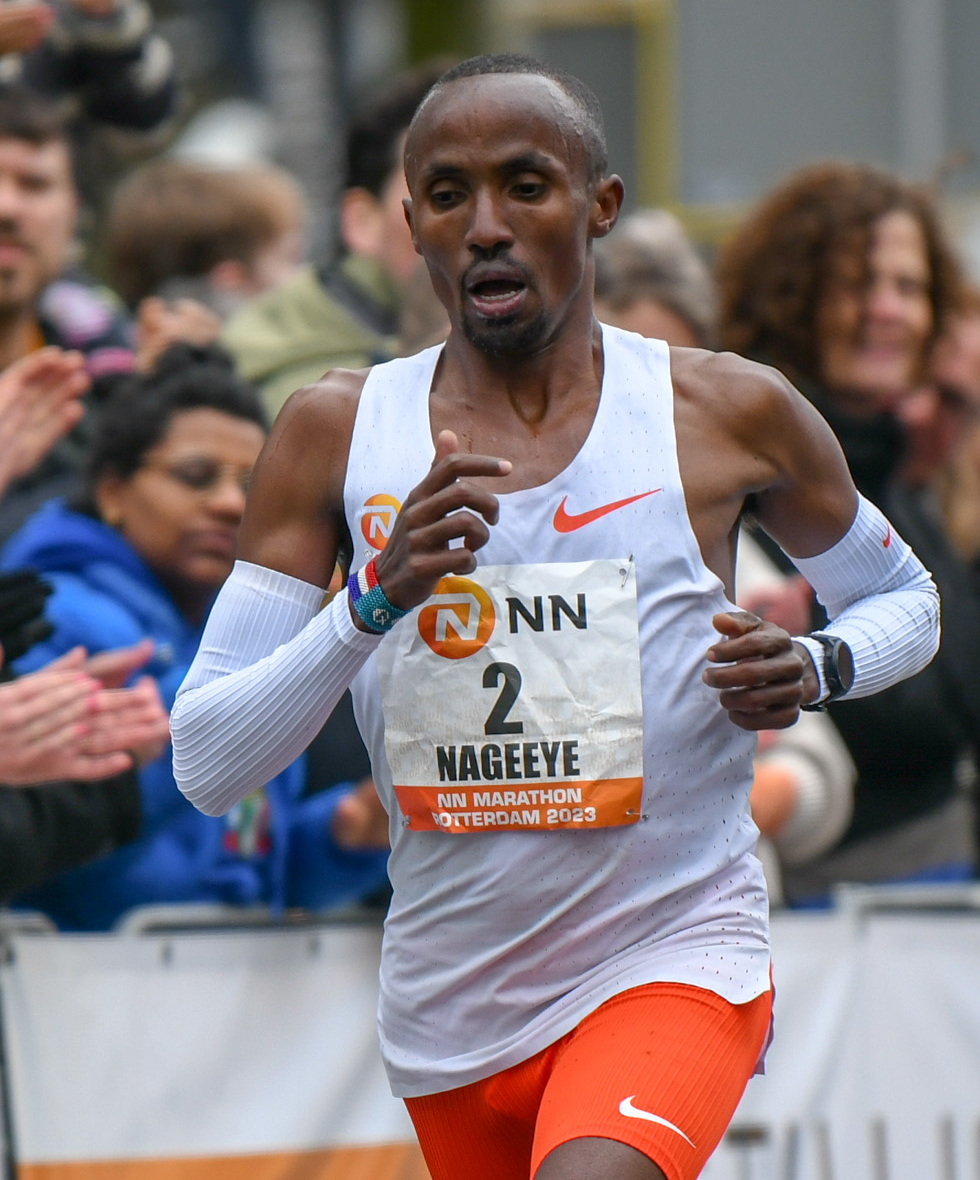
- Nageeye at the 2023 Rotterdam Marathon

Personal information
- Nationality: Dutch
- Born: 2 March 1989 (age 37) Mogadishu, Somalia
- Home town: Nijmegen, Netherlands
- Height: 1.65 m (5 ft 5 in)
- Weight: 54 kg (119 lb)

Sport
- Country: Netherlands
- Sport: Athletics
- Event: Long-distance running
- Club: AV'34
- Team: NN Running Team
- Coached by: Patrick Sang

Achievements and titles
- Personal bests: 10 km: 28:08 (2013, NR); Half marathon: 1:00:24 (2019, NR); Marathon: 2:04:45 (2024, NR)
Medal record
Men's athletics
Representing Netherlands
Olympic Games
Silver medal – second place	2020 Tokyo	Marathon
World Marathon Majors
Gold medal – first place	2024 New York City	Marathon
Bronze medal – third place	2022 New York City	Marathon

Abdi Nageeye (born 2 March 1989) is a Somali-Dutch long-distance runner from the Netherlands. He won the silver medal in the marathon at the 2020 Tokyo Olympics. Nageeye placed third at the 2022 New York City Marathon and won the 2024 New York City Marathon. He was the first European man since Mo Farah, and only the second European man overall, to win a World Marathon Major.

He is the Dutch national record holder for the 10 km road race, half marathon, and marathon.

== Early life ==
Abdi Nageeye was born on 2 March 1989 in Dharwanaaje, Somalia. At the age of six, he was resettled as a refugee in the Netherlands. After spending four years in the country, he then lived with his family in Syria and Somalia. Afterwards, Nageeye returned to the Netherlands via Ethiopia and was adopted by a family in Oldebroek.

He is fluent in Somali, Amharic, Arabic, Dutch, and English.

== Career ==
Nageeye finished eighth at the 2016 Boston Marathon. Later that year, he finished 11th in the Olympic marathon in Rio.

He set his first Dutch marathon record in October 2017 at the Amsterdam Marathon, clocking 2:08:16 to beat Kamiel Maase's 2:08.21 set also in Amsterdam in 2007.

In 2018, Nageeye competed in the men's marathon at the 2018 European Athletics Championships held in Berlin, Germany, where he did not finish the race.

At the 2019 Rotterdam Marathon, he lowered his national marathon record by nearly two minutes with a time of 2:06:17 for fourth place.

Nageeye has also trained in Kenya and is currently part of the NN Running Team, an international team of elite long-distance runners managed by Global Sports Communication in Nijmegen, Netherlands.

He won the silver medal in the 2020 Tokyo Olympic marathon, finishing in a season's best time of 2:09:58.

In April 2022, Nageeye won his first race over the classic distance, becoming the first Dutchman ever to win the Rotterdam Marathon. He ran a time of 2:04:56, slicing more than a minute off his own Dutch record which he set in the same city in 2019.

== Statistics ==
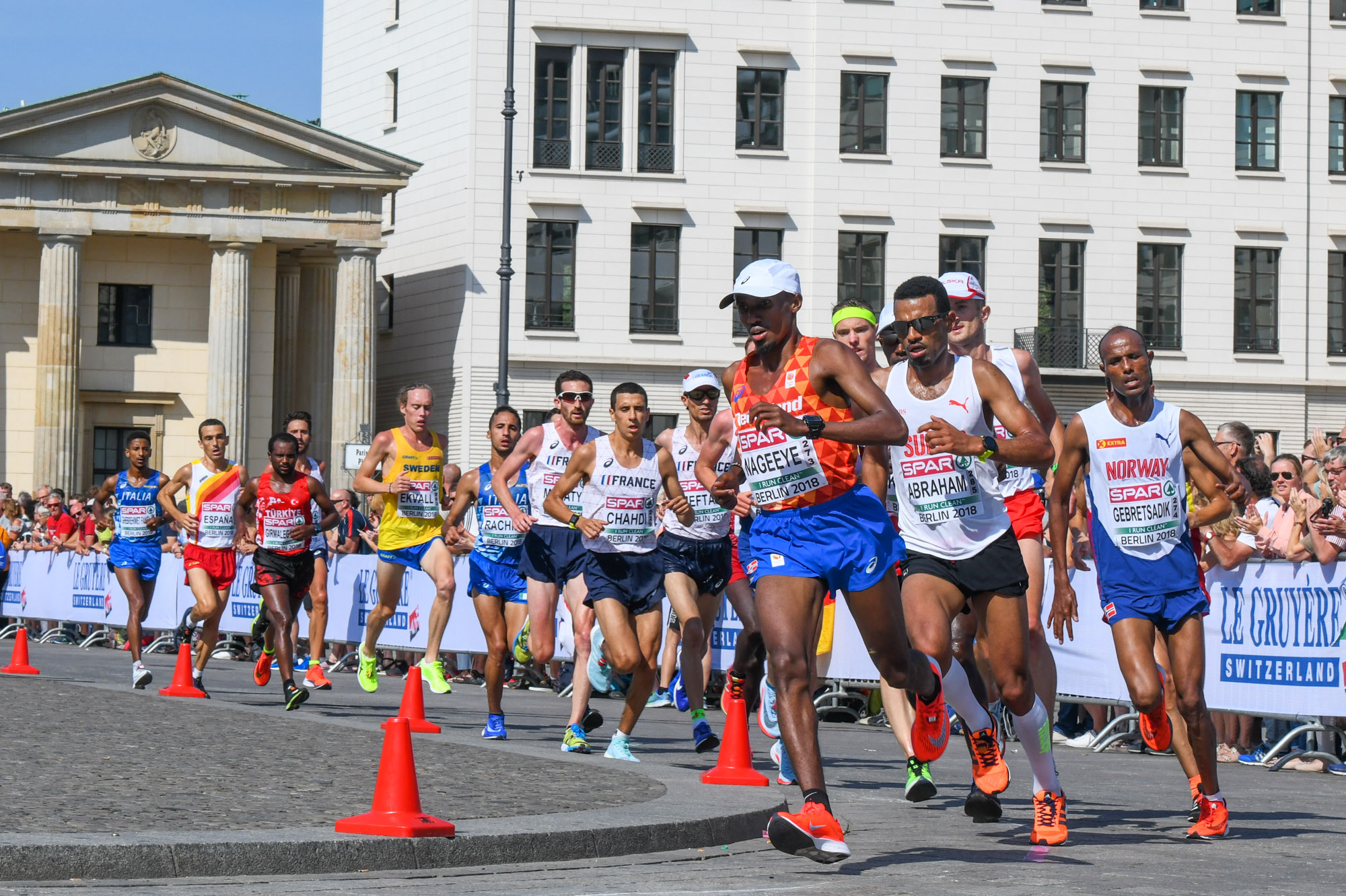
Nageeye leads the pack in the marathon at the 2018 European Athletics Championships held in Berlin.

=== Personal bests ===
Track

- 5000 metres – 13:38.86 (Oordegem, Lede 2012)
- 10,000 metres – 28:21.29 (Eugene, OR 2013)

Road

- 10 kilometres – 28:08 (Brunssum 2013) (NR 2013–2024)
- 10 miles – 46:26 (Tilburg 2017)
- Half marathon – 1:00:24 (Marugame 2019) NR
- Marathon – 2:04:45 (Rotterdam 2024) NR

=== International competitions ===
Year	Competition	Venue	Position	Event	Time
Representing the Netherlands
2007	European Cross Country Championships	Toro, Spain	24th	U20 race	20:49
2008	European Cross Country Championships	Brussels, Belgium	12th	U20 race	19:17
2009	European U23 Championships	Kaunas, Lithuania	11th	1500 m	3:53.04
2009	European U23 Championships	Kaunas, Lithuania	4th	5000 m	14:03.87
2009	European Cross Country Championships	Dublin, Ireland	7th	U23 race	25:40
2010	European Cross Country Championships	Albufeira, Portugal	33rd	U23 race	25:12
2011	European U23 Championships	Ostrava, Czech Republic	19th	5000 m	14:44.35
2011	European Cross Country Championships	Velenje, Slovenia	6th	U23 race	23:54
2012	European Championships	Helsinki, Finland	13th	10,000 m	29:05.12
2016	European Championships	Amsterdam, Netherlands	6th	Half marathon	1:03:43
2016	European Championships	Amsterdam, Netherlands	6th	Team	3:15:36
2016	Olympic Games	Rio de Janeiro, Brazil	11th	Marathon	2:13:01
2018	European Championships	Berlin, Germany	–	Marathon	DNF
2021	Olympic Games	Tokyo, Japan	2nd	Marathon	2:09:58 SB
2022	World Championships	Eugene, OR, United States	–	Marathon	DNF
2023	World Championships	Budapest, Hungary	–	Marathon	DNF
2024	Olympic Games	Paris, France	–	Marathon	DNF
World Marathon Majors
2016	Boston Marathon	Boston, MA, United States	8th	Marathon	2:18:05
2018	Boston Marathon	Boston, MA, United States	7th	Marathon	2:23:16
2021	New York City Marathon	New York, NY, United States	5th	Marathon	2:11:39
2022	New York City Marathon	New York, NY, United States	3rd	Marathon	2:10:31
2023	New York City Marathon	New York, NY, United States	5th	Marathon	2:10:21
2024	New York City Marathon	New York, NY, United States	1st	Marathon	2:07:39
2025	New York City Marathon	New York, NY, United States	–	Marathon	DNF

=== National titles ===
- Dutch Athletics Championships
  - 5000 metres: 2012
