= 2024 New York City Marathon =

26.2 mi (42.195 km) race in New York, U.S.

53rd New York City Marathon
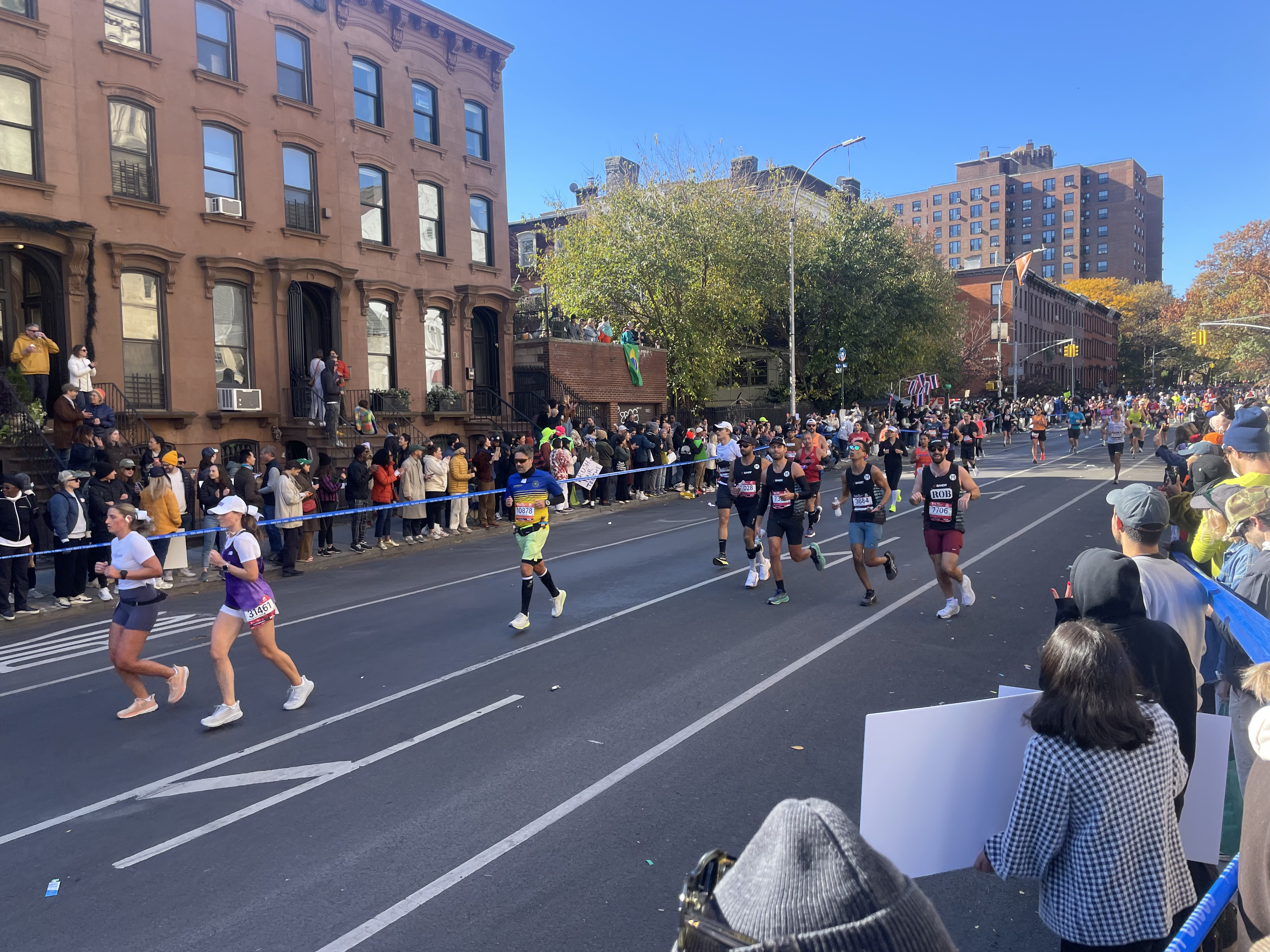
- View of 2024 New York City Marathon from Clinton Hill in Brooklyn
- Location: New York City, New York, U.S.
- Dates: November 3, 2024 (23 months ago)
- Website: www.nyrr.org/tcsnycmarathon

Champions
- Men: Abdi Nageeye (2:07:39)
- Women: Sheila Chepkirui (2:24:35)

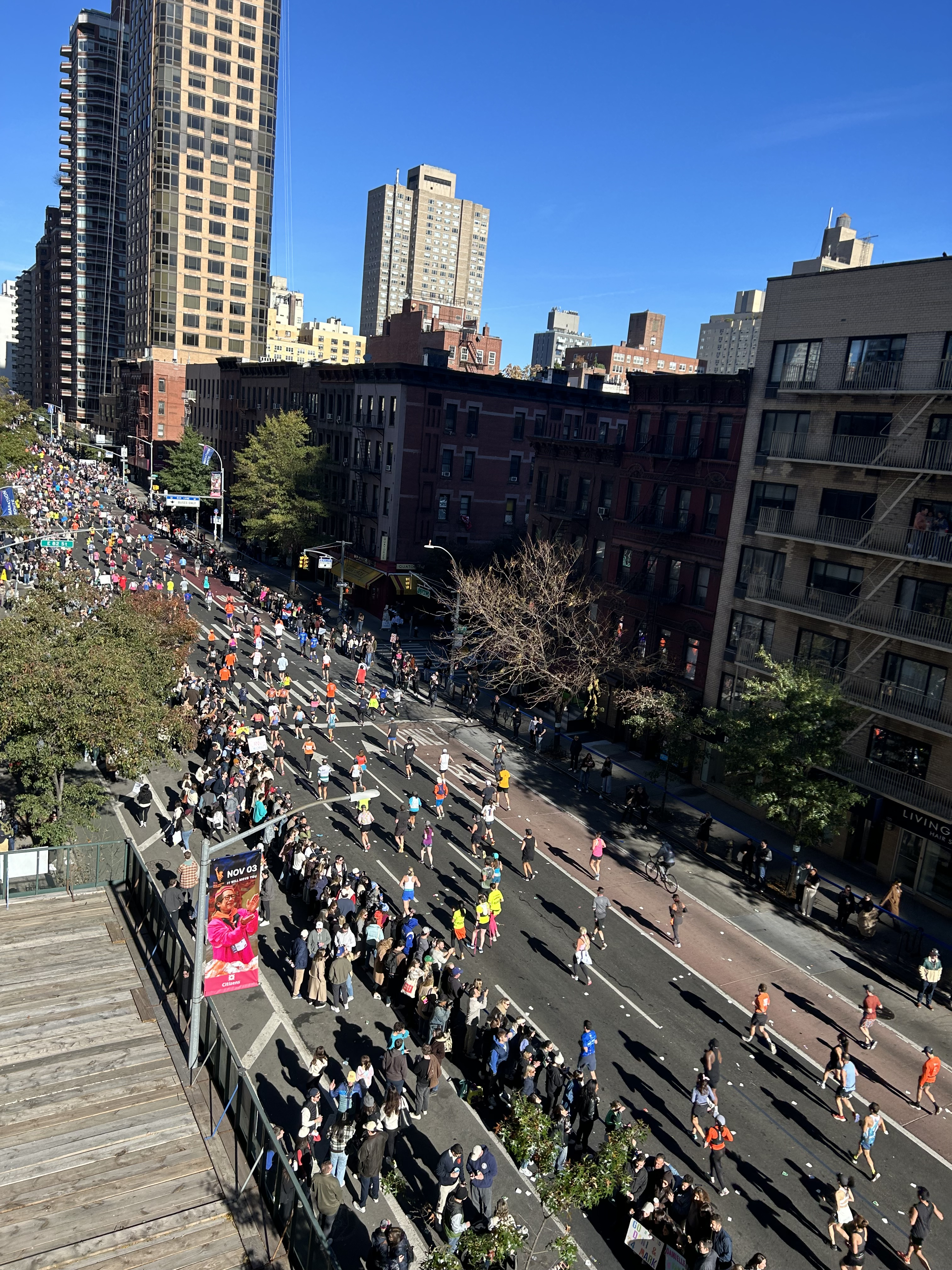
View of the 2024 New York City Marathon from an apartment balcony overlooking 81st St. and 1st Ave. in Manhattan

The 2024 New York City Marathon was the 53rd edition of the annual marathon race in New York City that took place on Sunday, November 3, 2024. The platinum-level race was the last of six World Marathon Majors events of the 2024 calendar year.

A record-high number of 55,646 runners finished the race, making this New York City Marathon the world's largest marathon to date.

== Background ==
For the 2024 event, New York City Road Runners announced applications for the race exceeded 165,000 athletes, the second highest since the inception of the race.

== Results ==
Abdi Nageeye of the Netherlands won the men's race with a time of 2:07:39, with Evans Chebet and Albert Korir of Kenya finishing second and third, respectively. Conner Mantz finished sixth in 2:09:00, which is the fastest finish for an American man since Alberto Salazar in 1981.

Sheila Chepkirui of Kenya won the women's race with a time of 2:24:35, with Hellen Obiri and Vivian Cheruiyot finishing second and third, respectively.

About 2 thousand runners were able to run under 3 hours, including YouTube celebrity, Casey Neistat. This also includes 178 women under the age of 40, about twice the previous high (90 in 2019). This is likely a consequence of the new method for using qualifying times from non-NYRR to earn guaranteed entry to the race.

=== Men ===
Elite men's top 10 finishers
| Position | Athlete | Nationality | Time |
|---|---|---|---|
| 1st place, gold medalist(s) | Abdi Nageeye | Netherlands | 2:07:39 |
| 2nd place, silver medalist(s) | Evans Chebet | Kenya | 2:07:45 |
| 3rd place, bronze medalist(s) | Albert Korir | Kenya | 2:08:00 |
| 4 | Tamirat Tola | Ethiopia | 2:08:12 |
| 5 | Geoffrey Kamworor | Kenya | 2:08:50 |
| 6 | Conner Mantz | United States | 2:09:00 |
| 7 | Clayton Young | United States | 2:09:21 |
| 8 | Abel Kipchumba | Kenya | 2:10:39 |
| 9 | Bashir Abdi | Belgium | 2:10:39 |
| 10 | CJ Albertson | United States | 2:10:57 |

=== Women ===
Elite women's top 10 finishers
| Position | Athlete | Nationality | Time |
|---|---|---|---|
| 1st place, gold medalist(s) | Sheila Chepkirui | Kenya | 2:24:35 |
| 2nd place, silver medalist(s) | Hellen Obiri | Kenya | 2:24:49 |
| 3rd place, bronze medalist(s) | Vivian Cheruiyot | Kenya | 2:25:21 |
| 4 | Eunice Chumba | Bahrain | 2:25:58 |
| 5 | Fabienne Schlumpf | Switzerland | 2:26:31 |
| 6 | Sara Vaughn | United States | 2:26:56 |
| 7 | Senbere Teferi | Ethiopia | 2:27:14 |
| 8 | Jessica McClain | United States | 2:27:19 |
| 9 | Sharon Lokedi | Kenya | 2:27:45 |
| 10 | Kellyn Taylor | United States | 2:27:59 |

Shalane Flanagan, winner of the 2017 New York City Marathon, completed the 2024 New York City Marathon in 3:05:20.
