= Grace Kahura =

Kenyan long-distance runner (born 1993)

Personal information
- Nationality: Kenyan
- Born: Grace Kahura; 5 April 1993 (age 33) Kanjeru, Kiambu County, Kenya
- Occupation: Long-distance runner
- Years active: 2013–present

Sport
- Country: Kenya
- Sport: Athletics
- Event(s): Marathon, Half marathon

Achievements and titles
- Personal bests: Marathon: 2:29:00 (2023); Half marathon: 1:13:53 (2022)

Grace Kahura (born 5 April 1993) is a Kenyan long-distance runner specializing in marathon and half marathon events. She is best known for winning the California International Marathon in 2023 and for her personal best marathon time of 2:29:00. Kahura has competed in several major international marathons, including the New York City Marathon and Grandma's Marathon.

== Early life ==
Kahura was born on 5 April 1993 in Kanjeru, Kiambu County. After sitting her exams at Kanjeru Girls High School, she moved to the United States to attend the University of Colorado. Kahura began competing in road races at this time, but only started training seriously after earning her degree.

== Career ==
Kahura achieved her personal best in the half marathon of 1:13:53 in 2022.

In 2021, she finished 9th at the 2021 New York City Marathon with a time of 2:30:32. She also placed 4th at the 2021 Grandma's Marathon, clocking 2:33:34.

In December 2023, she won the California International Marathon (CIM) with a personal best time of 2:29:00.

Earlier in 2023, she finished 6th at Grandma's Marathon with 2:30:14 and 3rd at the LA Marathon in 2:38:19. In 2024, she ran 2:30:02 to finish 2nd at Grandma's Marathon and 2:36:29 to place 13th at the Houston Marathon.

== Achievements ==
Year	Race	Location	Position	Time
2021	Grandma's Marathon	Duluth	4th	2:33:34
2021	New York City Marathon	New York City	9th	2:30:32
2022	New York City Marathon	New York City	20th	2:35:32
2023	LA Marathon	Los Angeles	3rd	2:38:19
2023	Grandma's Marathon	Duluth	6th	2:30:14
2023	California International Marathon	Sacramento	1st	2:29:00 (PB)
2024	Houston Marathon	Houston	13th	2:36:29
2024	Grandma's Marathon	Duluth	2nd	2:30:02
