= 2021 New York City Marathon =

50th running of the marathon

Coordinates: 40.6019°N 74.0622°W

50th New York City Marathon
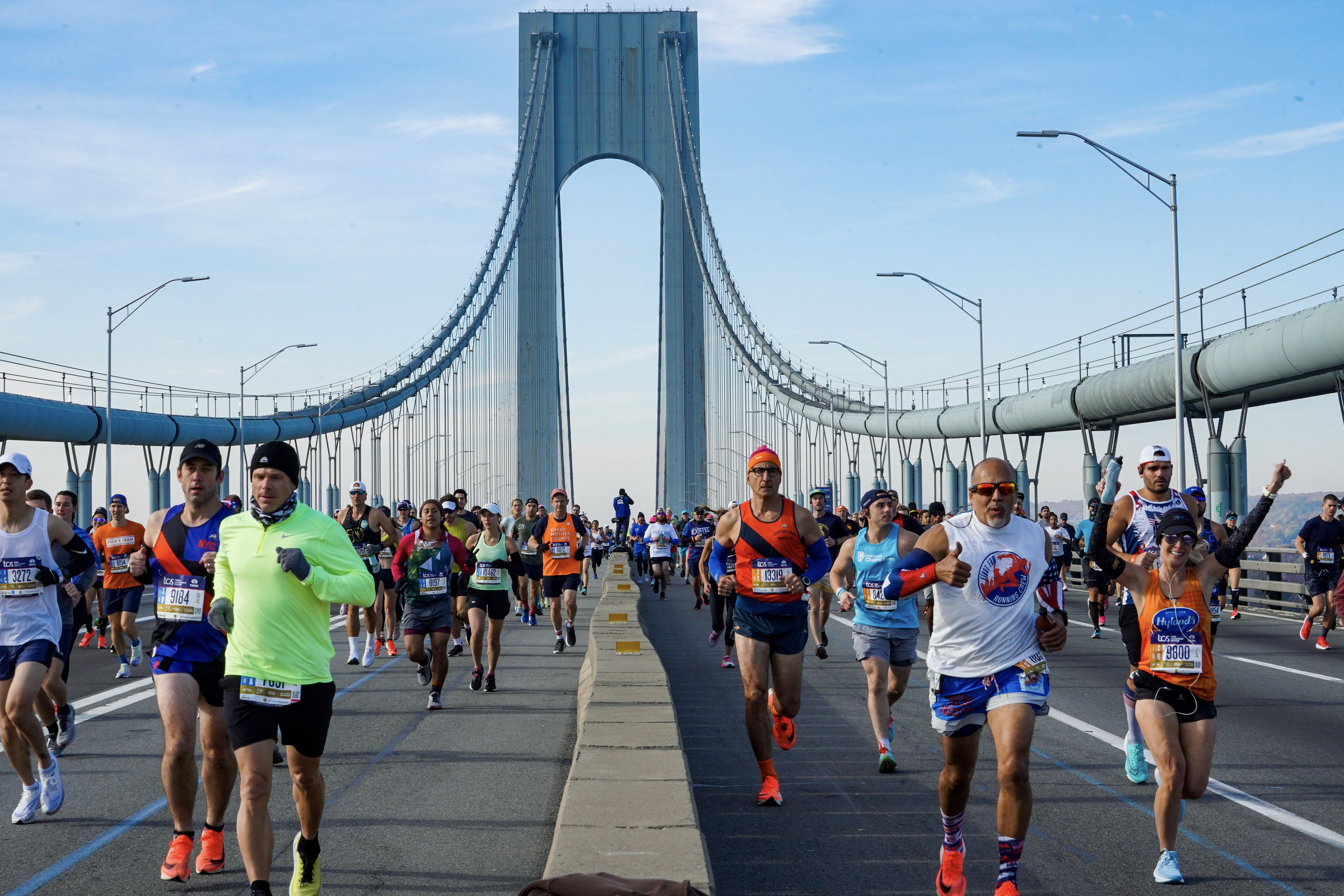
- Competitors on the Verrazzano–Narrows Bridge
- Location: New York City, United States
- Date: November 7, 2021
- Competitors: 25,020

Champions
- Men: Albert Korir (2:08:22)
- Women: Peres Jepchirchir (2:22:39)
- Wheelchair men: Marcel Hug (1:31:24)
- Wheelchair women: Madison de Rozario (1:51:01)

The 2021 New York City Marathon, the 50th running of that city's premier long-distance race, was held on November 7, 2021. Around 30,000 people ran in the event, of whom 25,020 finished. The race followed its traditional route, which passes through all five boroughs of New York City.

The elite races were won by Albert Korir and Peres Jepchirchir, both of Kenya, in 2:08:22 and 2:22:39 respectively; both athletes received $100,000 for winning their events. The wheelchair races were won by Marcel Hug of Switzerland and Madison de Rozario of Australia, in 1:31:24 and 1:51:01 respectively; both athletes received $25,000 for winning their events.

== Background ==
After the 2020 New York City Marathon was canceled due to the COVID-19 pandemic, the 2021 race was confirmed in June 2021 by Governor of New York Andrew Cuomo. It was held on its traditional date of the first Sunday in November. It was the last of the five World Marathon Majors held in 2021; all of the events in the series were run in the space of six weeks between late September and early November. (Note: The Tokyo Marathon, which is the sixth World Marathon Major, was postponed until 2022.) The 2021 New York City Marathon was sponsored by Indian company Tata Consultancy Services. The elite races had prize money of $100,000, $60,000 and $40,000 for the top three finishers, plus $25,000 for the highest finishing American competitor in each race. The total prize fund was $534,000 for each elite race. The wheelchair races awarded prize money of $25,000, $20,000 and $15,000 for the top three finishers in each event, and a total prize fund of $155,000.

Given the ongoing pandemic, the number of runners was limited to 33,000, and competitors were required to either prove that they were fully vaccinated against COVID-19 or to have had a recent negative COVID-19 test. Competitors were required to wear face coverings when not racing, and started in five different timeslots, to minimize crowding on the course.

=== Course ===
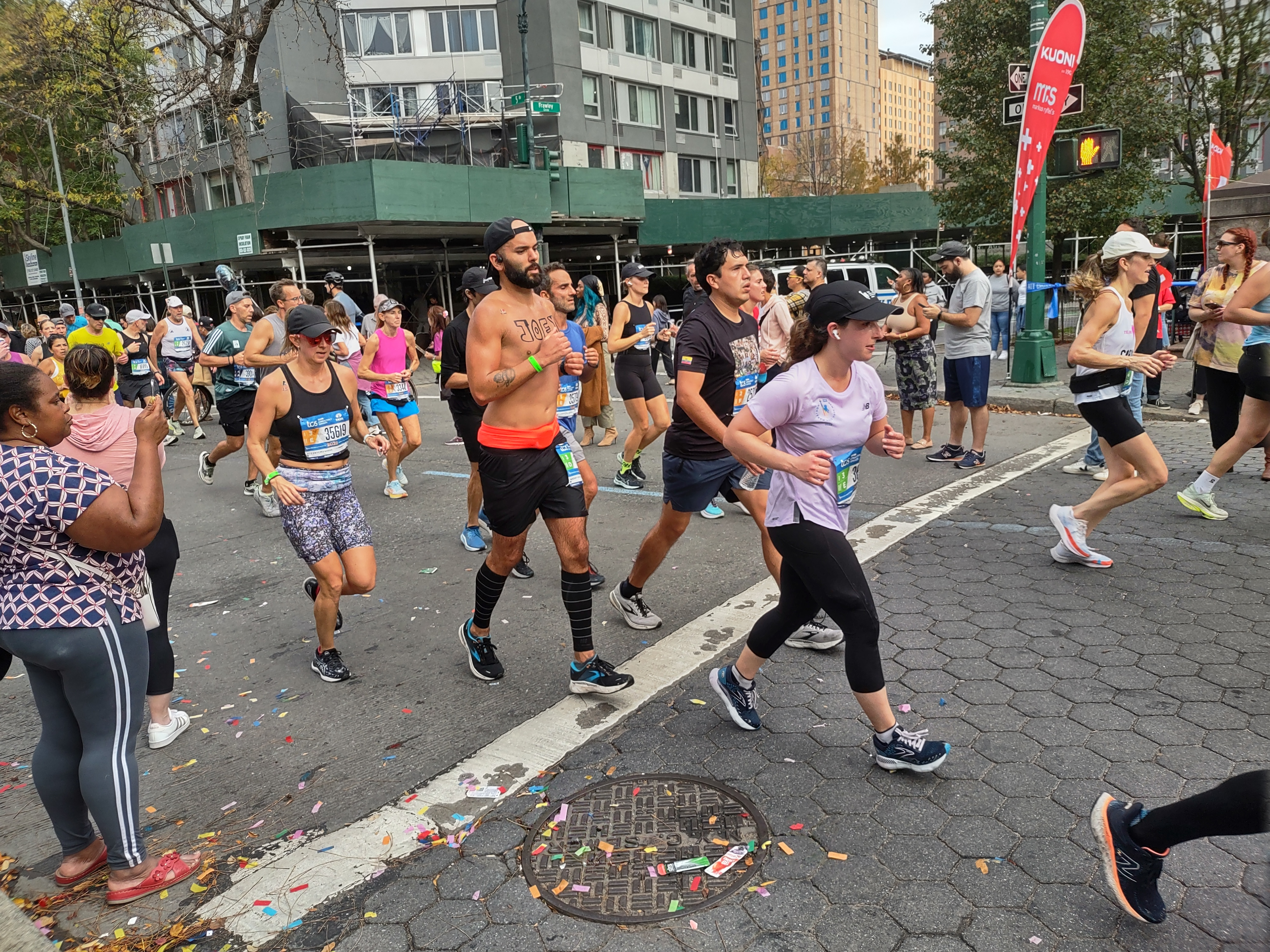
Runners in Harlem.

The marathon distance is 42.195 kilometres (26.219 mi) long as sanctioned by World Athletics. The New York City Marathon starts at Fort Wadsworth on Staten Island. The runners cross the Verrazzano–Narrows Bridge into mostly-flat Brooklyn where for the next 12 miles (19.3 km) they pass through Bay Ridge, Sunset Park, Park Slope, Fort Greene, Bedford-Stuyvesant, and Williamsburg. The course then enters Queens by crossing over the Pulaski Bridge; the mid-point of the race is on that bridge.

After a short time in Queens, the race crosses the Queensboro Bridge at mile 14 (22.5 km), and enters Manhattan where competitors run north on First Avenue for 3 miles (4.8 km). The runners cross the Willis Avenue Bridge, where they enter The Bronx for 2 miles (3.2 km) from mile 19 (30.6 km). The course then re-enters Manhattan via the Madison Avenue Bridge for the final 6.2 miles (10.0 km). After running through Harlem, there is a slight uphill section along Fifth Avenue before it flattens out and runs parallel to Central Park. The course then enters the park around mile 24, passes Columbus Circle at mile 25 and re-enters the park for the finish.

== Field ==
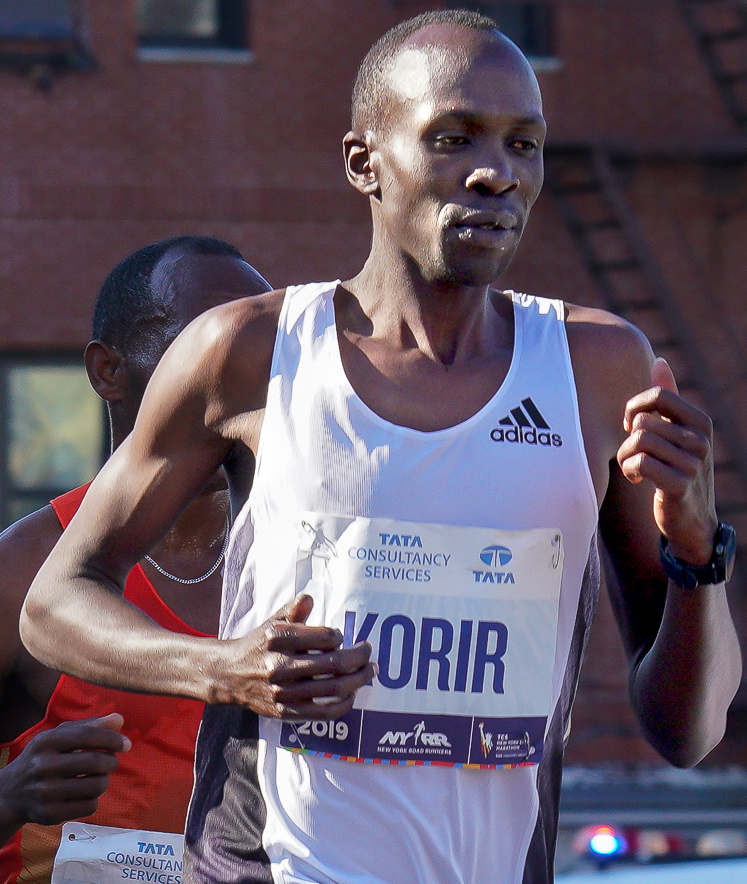
Albert Korir, pictured here at the 2019 event, won the elite men's race.

The elite women's race featured Peres Jepchirchir, who won the marathon event at the delayed 2020 Summer Olympics, and had the fastest personal best time of all competitors in the field. It was Jepchirchir's first New York City Marathon, and another debutant was Molly Seidel, who came third in the Olympic marathon. The race also included Ababel Yeshaneh and Nancy Kiprop, who came second and fourth respectively at the 2019 Chicago Marathon, 2018 Boston Marathon winner Des Linden, and Americans Sally Kipyego, Aliphine Tuliamuk and Emily Sisson. 2019 winner Joyciline Jepkosgei chose to run the 2021 London Marathon instead of the New York Marathon.

The elite men's race featured Kenenisa Bekele, his first appearance at the event. Bekele had not competed in a race in New York since 2006, but was convinced by New York Road Runners to attend. Albert Korir and Girma Bekele Gebre, who came second and third respectively at the 2019 event, returned for the 2021 event. Other competitors included Abdi Nageeye, who came second in the Olympic marathon event, Kibiwott Kandie, the world record holder in the half marathon in his first marathon race, 2016 winner Ghirmay Ghebreslassie, as well as Noah Droddy, Callum Hawkins and Jared Ward, all of whom had a personal best of under 2:10:00. Canadian Ben Preisner, whose personal best was just outside 2:10:00, also raced; it was his first World Marathon Major.

The women's wheelchair race featured Manuela Schär, who had won the last three New York City Marathons, and set the course record in 2019. Also competing were five-time winner Tatyana McFadden, who last won the event in 2016, as well as twice former champion Amanda McGrory, Madison de Rozario, who won the marathon event at the delayed 2020 Summer Paralympics, Nikita den Boer, who won the 2020 London Marathon, and Susannah Scaroni, who recorded the fastest time at the virtual 2020 New York City Marathon.

The men's wheelchair race featured 2018 and 2019 winner Daniel Romanchuk, as well as three time former champion Marcel Hug. Other competitors included Aaron Pike, who came fourth in the 2018 and 2019 races, Ernst van Dyk, who had won the Boston Marathon on 10 occasions, and David Weir, who was an eight-time winner of the London Marathon.

== Race summary ==
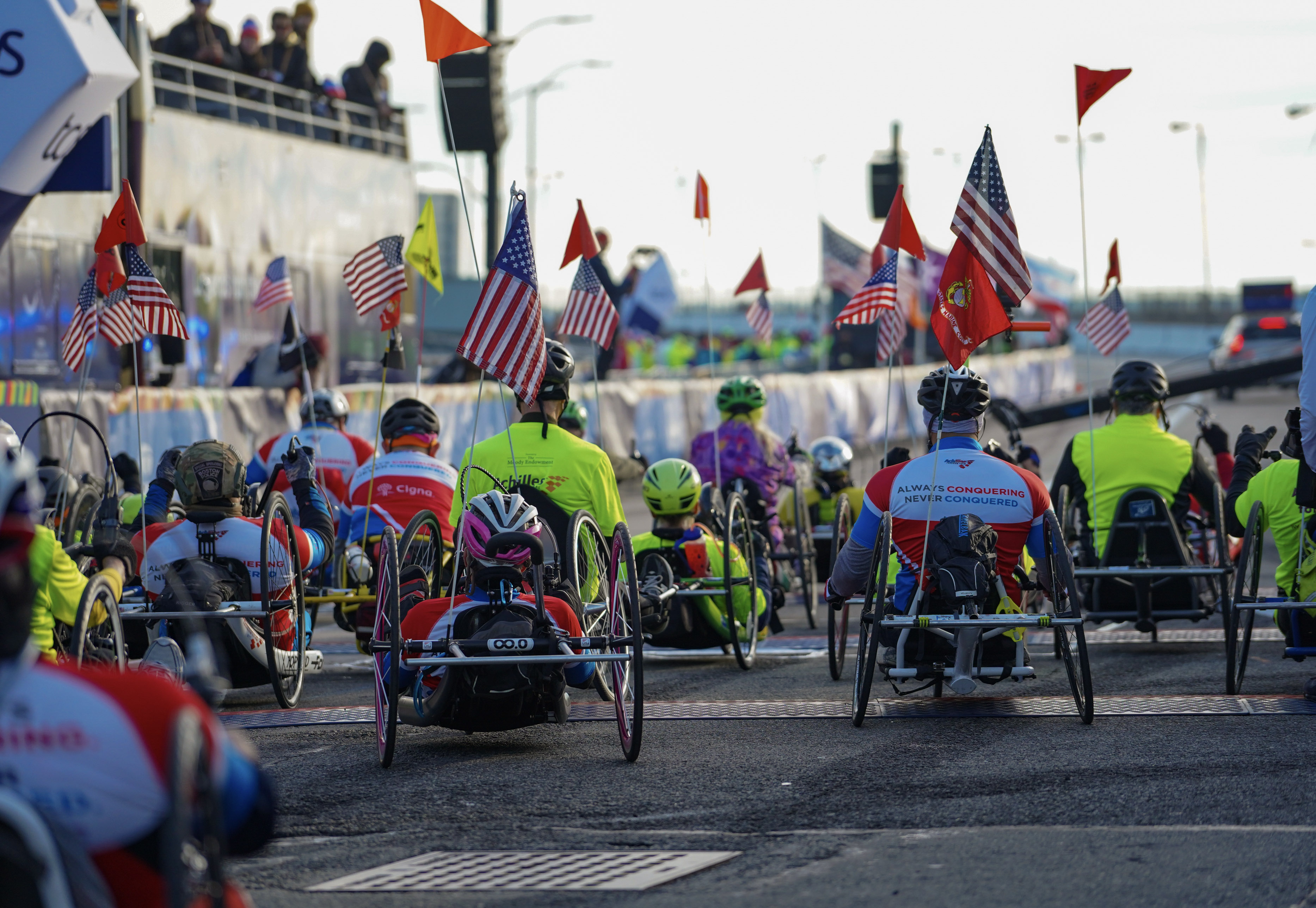
Competitors at the start of the handcycle race.

The wheelchair races started at 08:00 EST (13:00 UTC), the handcycle event commenced at 08:22 EST, the elite women's race began at 08:40 EST and the elite men's competition commenced at 09:05 EST. The race conditions were sunny with a cool temperature, and light wind, which helped enable fast races. The temperature was officially recorded as 44 °F (7 °C) at the race start and 52 °F (11 °C) at the finish line.

The elite women's race was won by Kenyan Peres Jepchirchir, ahead of fellow Kenyan Viola Cheptoo and Ethiopian Ababel Yeshaneh. It was the first time that any woman had won the Olympic and New York City Marathons in the same year. Jepchirchir took control of the race after 18 miles (29 km), but Jepchirchir, Cheptoo and Yeshaneh were still together as the race headed into Central Park. Jepchirchir finished in the third fastest time in history; she was nine seconds slower than the course record. Cheptoo and Yeshaneh's times were the fourth and sixth fastest times in history respectively. Molly Seidel finished fourth overall; her time of 2:24:42 was the fastest ever by an American woman at the New York City Marathon, beating Kara Goucher's time in the 2008 race by over a minute. Shalane Flanagan finished her sixth World Marathon Major of the year (including the virtual Tokyo Marathon), each one in a time of under three hours.

The elite men's event was won by Kenyan Albert Korir, ahead of Moroccan Mohamed El Araby and Italian Eyob Faniel. It was Korir's first victory at a World Marathon Major. El Araby and Faniel took the lead early in the race, and at the halfway point, they were 51 seconds ahead of a chasing group containing Korir. 18 miles (29 km) into the race, the pair were caught by Korir and Kibiwott Kandie, and Korir took the lead 2 miles (3.2 km) later. American Elkanah Kibet finished fourth overall, and won $25,000 for being the highest finishing American competitor.

The wheelchair women's event was won by Australian Madison de Rozario, the first time that the event had been won by an Australian. It was also the first time that a woman had won the Paralympic and New York City marathons in the same year. De Rozario, Manuela Schär and Tatyana McFadden traded the lead early on. Schär was dropped from the leading group after 30 kilometres (19 mi), and de Rozario took the race lead on the Queensboro Bridge. McFadden and Schär finished the race in second and third respectively.

The wheelchair men's event was won by Switzerland's Marcel Hug; it was his fourth New York City Marathon victory, and his fourth World Marathon Major victory of 2021. Hug led the race throughout; after 20 kilometres (12 mi), he had a lead of three minutes over Briton David Weir, and was on track to beat the course record. Hug eventually won by over 6 minutes, ahead of Weir and Daniel Romanchuk, who finished second and third respectively. Hug's finishing time was slower than the course record, as he lost time on hilly sections in the latter half of the race.

=== Non-elite race ===
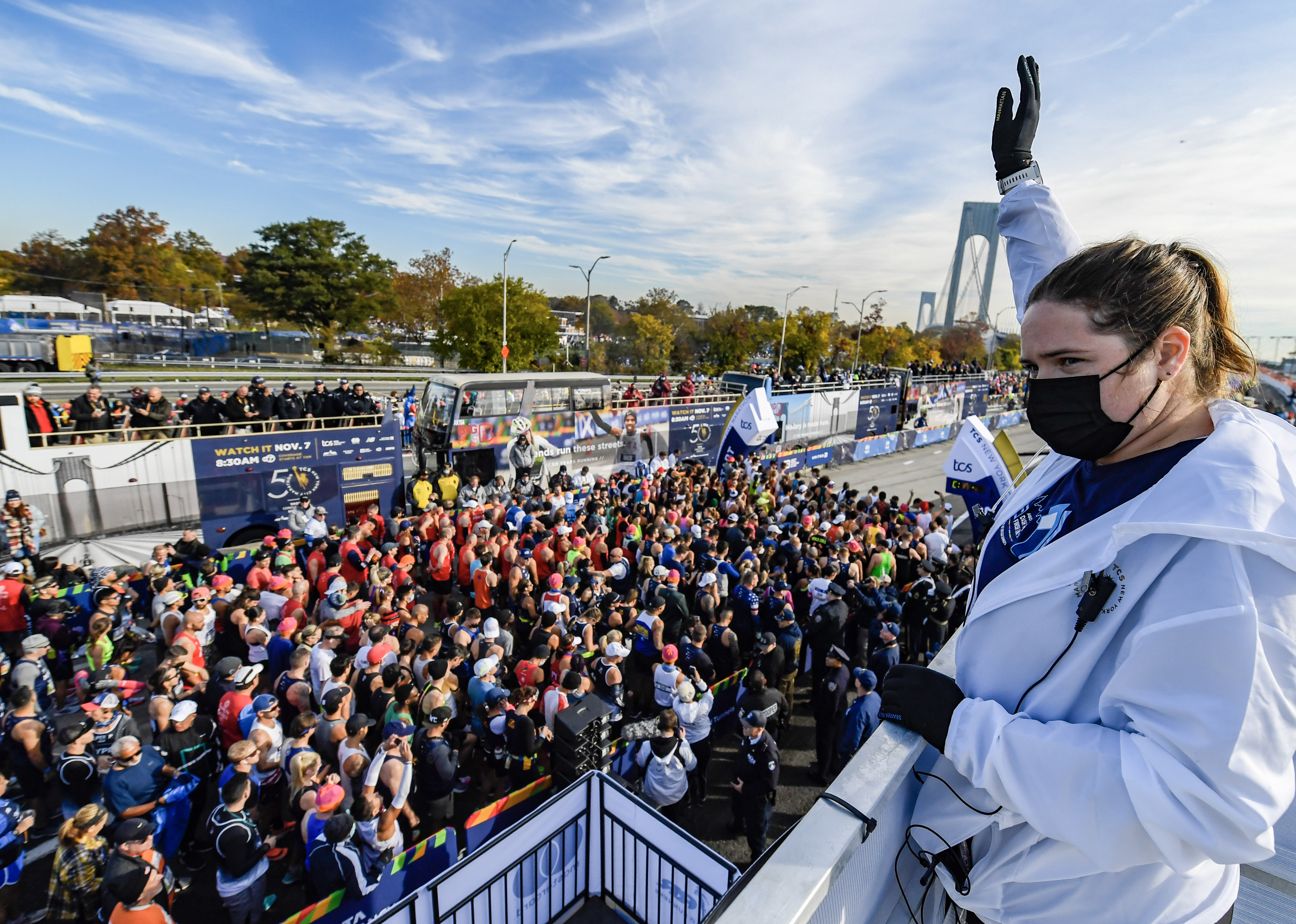
A start of the mass participation event.

The mass participation event commenced in five waves between 09:10 and 12:00 EST. Around 30,000 people competed in the mass participation event, of whom 25,020 finished. The first 8 miles (13 km) of the mass participation event were run on three different courses to prevent overcrowding.

Celebrity sportspeople who participated included former international women's soccer players Abby Wambach, Lauren Holiday, Kate Markgraf and Leslie Osborne, as well as former American footballer Tiki Barber. Other celebrity competitors included Catfish: The TV Show presenter Nev Schulman, musician Marcus Mumford, ultramarathon runner Robin Arzon, television presenter Willie Geist, Chelsea Clinton, the daughter of former US president Bill Clinton, supermodel Christy Turlington, and reality TV stars Tayshia Adams, Peter Weber and Matt James. Actress Kelli O'Hara competed and also sang the national anthem before the event.

== Results ==
=== Men ===
Elite men's top 10 finishers
Position	Athlete	Nationality	Time
1st place, gold medalist(s)	Albert Korir	Kenya	02:08:22
2nd place, silver medalist(s)	Mohamed El Araby	Morocco	02:09:06
3rd place, bronze medalist(s)	Eyob Faniel	Italy	02:09:52
4	Elkanah Kibet	United States	02:11:15
5	Abdi Nageeye	Netherlands	02:11:39
6	Kenenisa Bekele	Ethiopia	02:12:52
7	Ben True	United States	02:12:53
8	Nathan Martin	United States	02:12:57
9	Kibiwott Kandie	Kenya	02:13:43
10	Jared Ward	United States	02:13:43

=== Women ===
Elite women's top 10 finishers
Position	Athlete	Nationality	Time
1st place, gold medalist(s)	Peres Jepchirchir	Kenya	02:22:39
2nd place, silver medalist(s)	Viola Cheptoo	Kenya	02:22:44
3rd place, bronze medalist(s)	Ababel Yeshaneh	Ethiopia	02:22:52
4	Molly Seidel	United States	02:24:42
5	Helalia Johannes	Namibia	02:26:09
6	Kellyn Taylor	United States	02:26:10
7	Annie Frisbie	United States	02:26:18
8	Laura Thweatt	United States	02:27:00
9	Grace Kahura	Kenya	02:30:32
10	Stephanie Bruce	United States	02:31:05

=== Wheelchair men ===
Wheelchair men's top 10 finishers
Position	Athlete	Nationality	Time
1st place, gold medalist(s)	Marcel Hug	Switzerland	01:31:24
2nd place, silver medalist(s)	David Weir	United Kingdom	01:38:01
3rd place, bronze medalist(s)	Daniel Romanchuk	United States	01:38:22
4	Josh Cassidy	Canada	01:40:38
5	Ernst van Dyk	South Africa	01:41:51
6	Patrick Monahan	Ireland	01:41:53
7	Johnboy Smith	United Kingdom	01:43:23
8	Rafael Botello	Spain	01:43:37
9	Sho Watanabe	Japan	01:43:39
10	Krige Schabort	United States	01:44:25

=== Wheelchair women ===
Wheelchair women's top 10 finishers
Position	Athlete	Nationality	Time
1st place, gold medalist(s)	Madison de Rozario	Australia	01:51:01
2nd place, silver medalist(s)	Tatyana McFadden	United States	01:53:59
3rd place, bronze medalist(s)	Manuela Schär	Switzerland	01:54:02
4	Jenna Fesemyer	United States	01:59:45
5	Vanessa de Souza	Brazil	01:59:45
6	Yen Hoang	United States	02:02:38
7	Shelly Woods	United Kingdom	02:09:42
8	Michelle Wheeler	United States	02:18:13
9	Arielle Rausin	United States	02:25:21
10	Margriet van den Broek	Netherlands	02:28:10

=== Handcycle men ===
Handcycle men's top 3 finishers
Position	Athlete	Nationality	Time
1st place, gold medalist(s)	Roderick Sewell II	United States	01:35:13
2nd place, silver medalist(s)	Dennis McGorty	United States	01:39:26
3rd place, bronze medalist(s)	Glen Hartrick	United States	01:58:41

=== Handcycle women ===
Handcycle women's top 3 finishers
Position	Athlete	Nationality	Time
1st place, gold medalist(s)	Devann Murphy	United States	02:09:35
2nd place, silver medalist(s)	Jessica Hayon	United States	02:17:14
3rd place, bronze medalist(s)	Corey Petersen	United States	02:26:48
