= 2009 European Cross Country Championships =

Coordinates: 53°24′06″N 6°14′49″W

- Organisers: EAA
- Edition: 16th
- Date: 13 December
- Host city: Dublin, Ireland
- Venue: Santry Demesne
- Events: 6
- Distances: 9997 m – Men; 8018 m – Women; 8018 m – U23 men 6039 m – U23 women 6039 m – Junior men 4039 m – Junior women
- Participation: 323 athletes from 30 nations
- Official website: dublin2009.ie

The 2009 European Cross Country Championships was a continental cross country running competition that was held on 13 December 2009 near Dublin city, Fingal in Ireland. Dublin was selected as the host city in 2007 and the event was the first time that a major European athletics championships took place in Ireland. The six men's and women's races in the championship programme took place in Santry Demesne on a looped course with flat and grassy ground. The 16th edition of the European Cross Country Championships featured 323 athletes from 30 nations.

Alemayehu Bezabeh upset the defending champion (Serhiy Lebid) to win the men's senior race: it was his first medal at a major international competition and he was the first Spanish runner to win in the history of the championships. In the women's senior competition, Hayley Yelling was a surprise winner, having come out of her competitive retirement just weeks before the race. The much favoured Portuguese team (which included Jessica Augusto and Inês Monteiro) did not reach the individual podium but they took the gold in the team competition.

Noureddine Smaïl and Hassan Chahdi took gold and silver in the men's under-23 competition, leading the French to a team victory. Jeroen D'Hoedt was the winner of the men's junior race. Sultan Haydar won the women's under-23 race while Karoline Bjerkeli Grøvdal added to her junior honours with a gold in the women's junior race, becoming the first Norwegian gold medallist of the championships' history.

Almost 7000 spectators attended the championships and, in Europe, it was broadcast live on television for free by RTÉ, the Irish state broadcaster.

== Bidding ==
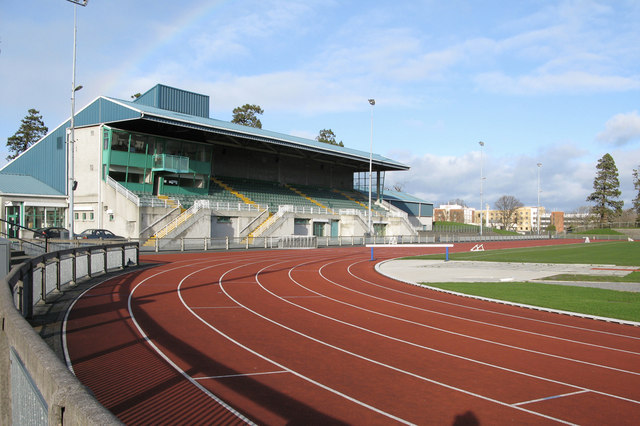
The championship course was next to Morton Stadium.

Ireland's bid for the competition was first discussed in 2006 when Liam Hennessy, president of Athletics Ireland, proposed the idea at the European Athletics conference that year. After the proposal had gained the support of the Athletics Ireland board, Fingal County Council and the Irish Sports Council, the state broadcaster (RTÉ) agreed to show the event live on television for free across Europe.

The bidding process concluded in October 2007 at a presentation to the European Athletics Association in Malta. The Irish bid to host the championships was led by Mary Coghlan (Chair of Finance & Risk AAI), Senan Turnbull (Fingal Council's director of community, culture and sports), Liam Hennessy (President of AAI), Paddy Marlay (Competition Committee of AAI) and beat proposals from France and Poland. Ireland had hosted the World Cross Country Championships in 1979 and 2002, but this was the first time that Ireland had ever hosted a major European athletics competition.

== Course ==
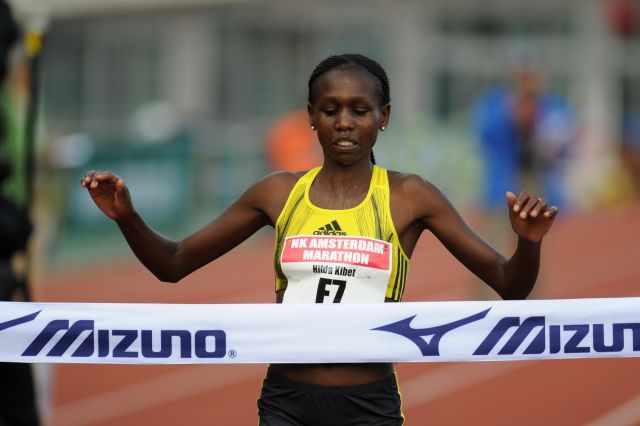
The reigning women's champion, Hilda Kibet, did not defend her title.

The course was situated in Santry Demesne Park adjacent the national track and field stadium, Morton Stadium, which is the home stadium for Clonliffe Harriers – the oldest athletics club in Ireland. The course's looped design allowed for races of varying lengths through the use of laps. The four race lengths were: 9,997 metres (6.212 mi) for the senior men's race, 8,018 metres (4.982 mi) for the senior women's and men's under-23 competitions, 6,039 metres (3.752 mi) for the under-23 women and junior men, and finally 4,039 metres (2.510 mi) for the women's junior race. The ground of the course was grassy throughout and, while it did contain some slight dips and uphills, it did not feature any severe obstacles or inclines.

== Competition ==
Prior to the championships, eight-time gold medal winner Serhiy Lebid was the favourite for the men's race, with Great Britain's Mo Farah representing the greatest challenge to him. For the women's race, reigning champion Hilda Kibet had decided not to compete. This left the women's senior competition without a clear favourite: Portugal's Jessica Augusto and Inês Monteiro, along with former champions Hayley Yelling and Tetyana Holovchenko, comprised the likely medallists, while Mary Cullen was the home favourite.

On the day of the race, an estimated 7000 spectators were in attendance and a total of 323 athletes represented 30 European nations. Although the championships only accepts athletes who are citizens of European countries, African-born athletes were highly represented among those who reached the podium: Ethiopian-born runners Alemayehu Bezabeh and Sultan Haydar Sultan, and Algerian-born Noureddine Smaïl all took gold medals, while Atelaw Yeshetela and Somali-born athlete Mo Farah won minor medals.

=== Men's race ===
There was a slow start to the men's senior race, with a large leading pack reaching the 2.5 km mark. However, soon after that point, Mo Farah made clear his intention to win the race, increasing the pace and accelerating away from the pack. He remained the leader for the first half of the race, with Alemayehu Bezabeh following closely and Lebid a little further behind. Bezabeh, competing in only his second European championships, overtook Farah in the fourth lap and began to create a lead for himself. Farah made ground on the leader in the final lap, but he tired towards the end. Bezabeh went on to win his first major title, becoming the first Spaniard to win the championships.

Coming in second place, Farah collapsed after the finish line and missed the medal ceremony as he received medical assistance. Although ahead of the rest of the pack, Lebid was a clear third and was some way off the two frontrunners – an injury two weeks prior to the race had affected his preparations and he was pleased to receive the bronze medal. Spanish runners Sergio Sánchez and Ayad Lamdassem took fourth and fifth places, all but guaranteeing Spain the men's team gold medal.

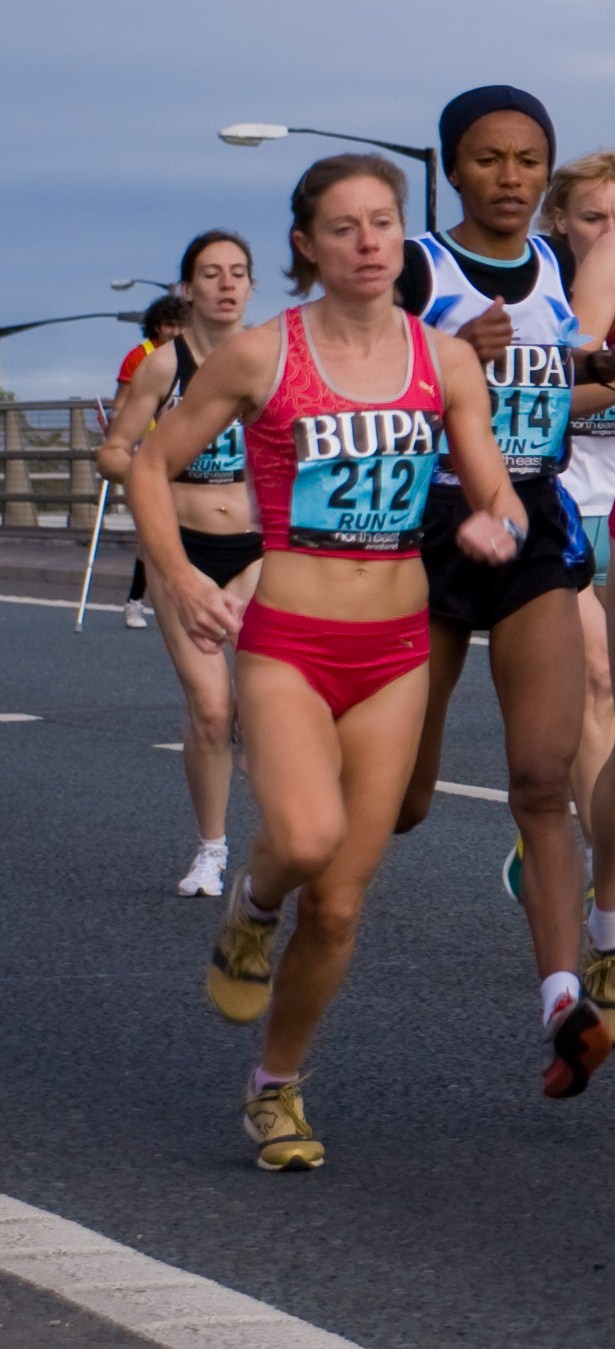
Hayley Yelling, the 2004 champion, won the women's senior race.

=== Women's race ===
The women's senior race also had an unexpected winner: Hayley Yelling of Great Britain (the 2004 championships winner) had retired from athletics after a poor showing at the 2008 European Cross Country Championships, but she returned to competition in December 2009 with a win at the British selection race for that year's race.

Yelling started with a quick pace, rapidly building up a lead over the pack of runners in the early stages of the race. During the second lap, the Portuguese runners, along with Rosa María Morató and Adriënne Herzog, remained in pursuit but Ireland's Mary Cullen had faded behind. Yelling, still leading, maintained her fast speed after the halfway point while Augusto and Morató filled out the medalling positions. Morató pulled away from Augusto, but never managed to make up the six-second gap between her and Yelling. The Briton took the gold medal and Morató was next to come in, receiving the silver medal. Meanwhile, Herzog overtook a tired Jessica Augusto for the bronze. Augusto, Monteiro, and Ana Dulce Félix of Portugal filled out the top six finishers; although they had failed to reach the individual podium, the trio and tenth-placed Sara Moreira won the team gold medals by a significant margin.

=== Under-23 and junior races ===
In the men's under-23 race, there was a large group of runners at the front up until the 3.5 km mark, at which point a pack of three runners led the race throughout: Atelaw Yeshetela of Belgium, and Hassan Chahdi and Noureddine Smaïl of France. The three took turns in leading the race and remained close. However, in the final lap, Smaïl broke away from the other two runners and was unchallenged at the finish line, proving his abilities after a disappointing race in 2008. Chahdi was the silver medallist and Yeshetela took third place, while Frenchman Florian Carvalho was fourth, setting up France as the team gold medallists of the race. Great Britain and Belgium took the team silver and bronze respectively.

As she had done in the previous year's competition, Sultan Haydar of Turkey took the lead early on in the women's under-23 competition. By the halfway mark she was thirteen seconds clear of the other runners, but her pace started to slow. Irina Sergeyeva quickly reduced the Turkish runner's lead and on the final lap she threatened to take first place. However, Sergeyeva was beaten by Haydar's sprint finish in the final home straight. Jessica Sparke took the bronze, and her teammates Charlotte Browning and Hollie Rowland followed shortly after to continue Great Britain's unbeaten run of gold medals in the women's under-23 team competition.

In the junior races, Karoline Bjerkeli Grøvdal became the first Norwegian to win at the European Championships. The European Junior Champion quickly took control of the women's race and managed to hold off Gulshat Fazlitdinova to win the title. Kate Avery was the bronze medallist in the individual race, and Russia, Great Britain and Germany were the team medallists. Grøvdal's compatriot Sondre Nordstad Moen failed to make it a junior double for Norway in the men's race. Moen led the race for the first three laps with a comfortable pace, but Jeroen D'Hoedt pulled ahead for the final lap. Nick Goolab made up significant ground to pip teammate James Wilkinson for the silver at the finish line. Moen ended up fourth, but he won a team bronze with Norway. Britain and France won the gold and silver team medals, respectively.

== Race results ==
=== Men's senior ===
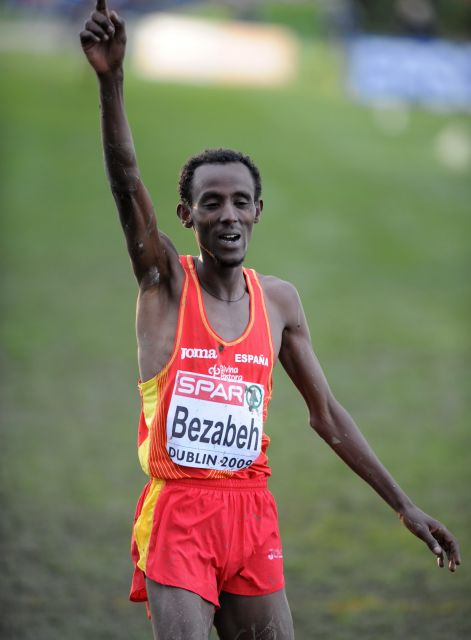
Alemayehu Bezabeh became the first Spanish man to win at the championships.

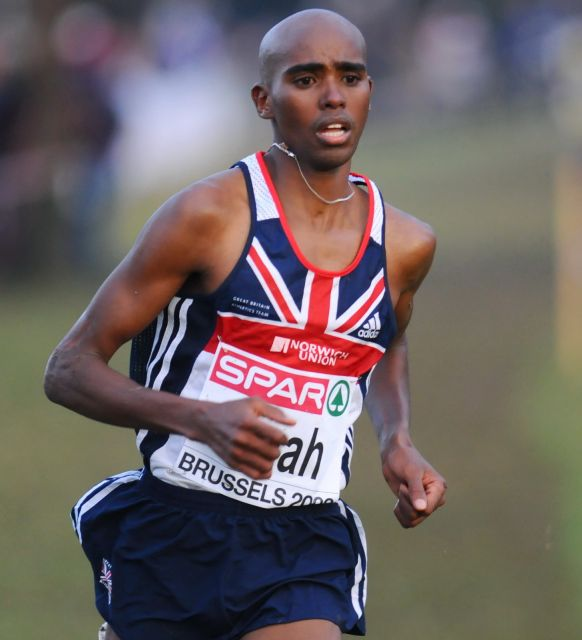
The 2008 silver medallist Mo Farah finished again in second place.

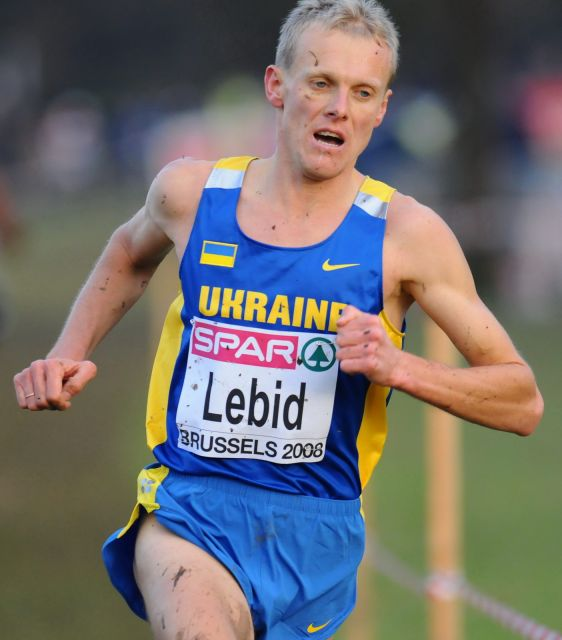
Eight-time champion Serhiy Lebid managed only bronze in 2009.

Individual race
Rank	Athlete	Country	Time (m:s)
Gold medal	Alemayehu Bezabeh	Spain	30:45
Silver medal	Mo Farah	United Kingdom	31:02
Bronze medal	Serhiy Lebid	Ukraine	31:17
4	Sergio Sánchez	Spain	31:26
5	Ayad Lamdassem	Spain	31:30
6	José Rocha	Portugal	31:34
7	Eduard Mbengani	Portugal	31:41
8	Mark Kenneally	Ireland	31:42
9	Daniele Meucci	Italy	31:42
10	Stéphane Joly	Switzerland	31:46
11	Driss El Himer	France	31:54
12	Andy Vernon	United Kingdom	31:54
13	Michael Skinner	United Kingdom	31:54
14	Licínio Pimentel	Portugal	31:54

Team race
Rank	Team	Points
Gold medal	Spain; Alemayehu Bezabeh; Sergio Sánchez; Ayad Lamdassem; Francisco Javier López	34
Silver medal	United Kingdom; Mo Farah; Andy Vernon; Michael Skinner; Benedict Whitby	54
Bronze medal	Italy; Daniele Meucci; Stefano La Rosa; Andrea Lalli; Gabriele De Nard; Gianmarco Buttazzo; Martin Dematteis	62
4	France	67
5	Portugal	73
6	Ireland	115
7	Belgium	146
8	Germany	149

- Note: Scores are calculated by combining the finishing positions of a country's top four athletes. The country with the lowest cumulative score wins.
- Totals: 67 entrants, 65 starters, 62 finishers, 10 teams

=== Women's senior ===
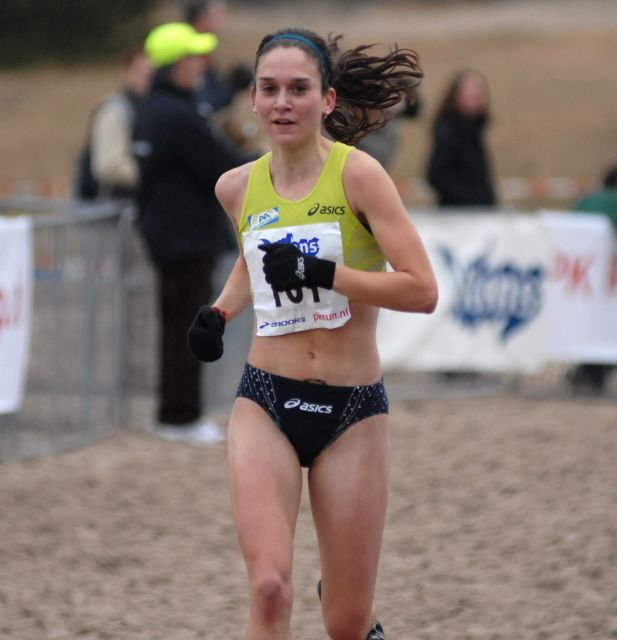
Adriënne Herzog of the Netherlands took the bronze in the senior women's competition.

Individual race
Rank	Athlete	Country	Time (m:s)
Gold medal	Hayley Yelling	United Kingdom	27:49
Silver medal	Rosa María Morató	Spain	27:56
Bronze medal	Adriënne Herzog	Netherlands	28:04
4	Jessica Augusto	Portugal	28:11
5	Inês Monteiro	Portugal	28:14
6	Ana Dulce Félix	Portugal	28:19
7	Olivera Jevtic	Serbia	28:21
8	Tetyana Holovchenko	Ukraine	28:25
9	Freya Murray	United Kingdom	28:25
10	Sara Moreira	Portugal	28:32
11	Fionnuala Britton	Ireland	28:39
12	Mary Cullen	Ireland	28:45

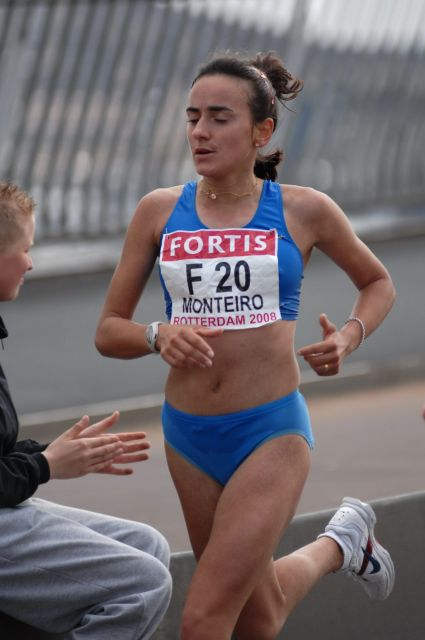
Inês Monteiro helped Portugal to the team gold.

Team race
Rank	Team	Points
Gold medal	Portugal; Jessica Augusto; Inês Monteiro; Ana Dulce Félix; Sara Moreira	25
Silver medal	United Kingdom; Hayley Yelling; Freya Murray; Katrina Wootton; Sonia Samuels	51
Bronze medal	Spain; Rosa María Morató; Iris María Fuentes-Pila; Alessandra Aguilar; Nuria Fernández	58
4	Ireland	82
5	Italy	130
6	France	103
7	Sweden	141
8	Germany	161

- Totals: 53 entrants, 51 starters, 50 finishers, 8 teams

=== Men's under-23 ===
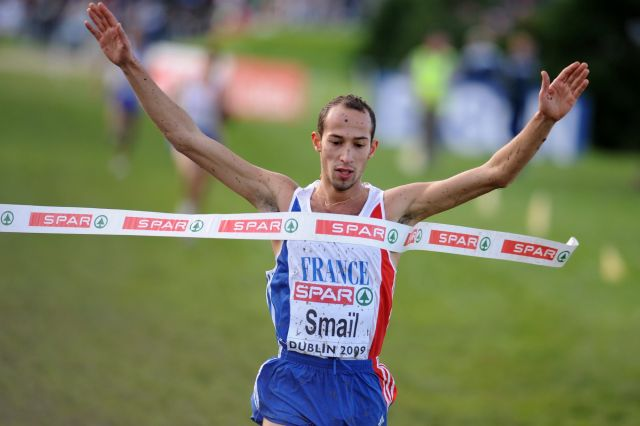
Noureddine Smaïl of France won his first major U-23 cross country competition.

Individual race
Rank	Athlete	Country	Time (m:s)
Gold medal	Noureddine Smaïl	France	25:11
Silver medal	Hassan Chahdi	France	25:17
Bronze medal	Atelaw Yeshetela	Belgium	25:21
4	Florian Carvalho	France	25:30
5	Mitch Goose	United Kingdom	25:33
6	Christoph Ryffel	Switzerland	25:38
7	Abdi Nageeye	Netherlands	25:40
8	Ricky Stevenson	United Kingdom	25:40
9	Musa Roba-Kinkal	Germany	25:41
10	Alexander Söderberg	Sweden	25:45
11	Lewis Timmins	United Kingdom	25:45
12	Yegor Nikolayev	Russia	25:46

Team race
Rank	Team	Points
Gold medal	France; Noureddine Smaïl; Hassan Chahdi; Florian Carvalho; Matthieu Le Stum	31
Silver medal	United Kingdom; Mitch Goose; Ricky Stevenson; Lewis Timmins; Jonathan Taylor	45
Bronze medal	Belgium; Atelaw Yeshetela; Sanne Torfs; Kim Ruell; Ruben Vandevelde	59
4	Spain	81
5	Turkey	102
6	Ireland	105
7	Portugal	128
8	Netherlands	134

- Totals: 82 entrants, 81 starters, 75 finishers, 11 teams

=== Women's under-23 ===
Individual race
Rank	Athlete	Country	Time (m:s)
Gold medal	Sultan Haydar	Turkey	21:14
Silver medal	Irina Sergeyeva	Russia	21:15
Bronze medal	Jessica Sparke	United Kingdom	21:26
4	Charlotte Browning	United Kingdom	21:30
5	Hollie Rowland	United Kingdom	21:31
6	Tatyana Shutova	Russia	21:32
7	Sandra Eriksson	Finland	21:32
8	Natalya Puchkova	Russia	21:36
9	Alfiya Khasanova	Russia	21:39
10	Stevie Stockton	United Kingdom	21:39
11	Stephanie Twell	United Kingdom	21:42
12	Anna Hahner	Germany	21:49

Team race
Rank	Team	Points
Gold medal	United Kingdom; Jessica Sparke; Charlotte Browning; Hollie Rowland; Stevie Stockton	22
Silver medal	Russia; Irina Sergeyeva; Tatyana Shutova; Natalya Puchkova; Alfiya Khasanova	25
Bronze medal	France; Claire Navez; Louise Ghesquiere; Patricia Laubertie; Laura Miclo	85
4	Germany	85
5	Ireland	98
6	Spain	155
7	Ukraine	162
8	Italy	163

- Totals: 61 entrants, 61 starters, 59 finishers, 8 teams

=== Men's junior ===
Individual race
Rank	Athlete	Country	Time (m:s)
Gold medal	Jeroen D'Hoedt	Belgium	18:46
Silver medal	Nick Goolab	United Kingdom	18:47
Bronze medal	James Wilkinson	United Kingdom	18:47
4	Sondre Nordstad Moen	Norway	18:49
5	Richard Goodman	United Kingdom	18:56
6	Rui Pinto	Portugal	18:57
7	Nemenja Cerovac	Serbia	18:59
8	Bryan Cantero	France	19:01
9	Abdelatif Hadjam	France	19:03
10	Lars Erik Malde	Norway	19:03
11	Soufiane Bouchikhi	Belgium	19:05
12	Henrik Ingebrigtsen	Norway	19:07

Team race
Rank	Team	Points
Gold medal	United Kingdom; Nick Goolab; James Wilkinson; Richard Goodman; Matthew Gillespie Callum Hawkins; Jonathan Hay	24
Silver medal	France; Bryan Cantero; Abdelatif Hadjam; Tanguy Pepiot; Colin Guillard Michael Gras; Valentin Pepiot	58
Bronze medal	Norway; Sondre Nordstad Moen; Lars Erik Malde; Henrik Ingebrigtsen; Harald Kaarboe Thomas Solberg Eide; Ferdinand Kvan Edman	77
4	Belgium	93
5	Spain	98
6	Portugal	127
7	Germany	129
8	Italy	137

- Totals: 89 entrants, 89 starters, 88 finishers, 15 teams

=== Women's junior ===
Individual race
Rank	Athlete	Country	Time (m:s)
Gold medal	Karoline Bjerkeli Grøvdal	Norway	14:10
Silver medal	Gulshat Fazlitdinova	Russia	14:12
Bronze medal	Kate Avery	United Kingdom	14:27
4	Corinna Harrer	Germany	14:33
5	Federica Bevilacqua	Italy	14:33
6	Lauren Howarth	United Kingdom	14:35
7	Sandra Mosquera	Spain	14:38
8	Lyudmila Lebedeva	Russia	14:38
9	Ciara Mageehan	Ireland	14:40
10	Cataryna Ribeiro	Portugal	14:40
11	Carla Salomé Rocha	Portugal	14:41
12	Amela Terzić	Serbia	14:42

Team race
Rank	Team	Points
Gold medal	Russia; Gulshat Fazlitdinova; Lyudmila Lebedeva; Yelena Sedova; Tatyana Prorokova	47
Silver medal	United Kingdom; Kate Avery; Lauren Howarth; Eleanor Wimshurst; Beth Potter	51
Bronze medal	Germany; Corrina Harrer; Jana Sussman; Gesa-Felicitas Krause; Stephanie Platt	73
4	France	98
5	Italy	100
6	Portugal	103
7	Belgium	118
8	Ukraine	122

- Totals: 76 entrants, 76 starters, 76 finishers, 11 teams

== Total medal table ==
Rank	Nation	Gold	Silver	Bronze	Total
1	Great Britain (GBR)	3	6	3	12
2	France (FRA)	2	2	1	5
3	Spain (ESP)	2	1	1	4
4	Russia (RUS)	1	3	0	4
5	Belgium (BEL)	1	0	2	3
6	Norway (NOR)	1	0	1	2
7	Portugal (POR)	1	0	0	1
7	Turkey (TUR)	1	0	0	1
9	Germany (GER)	0	0	1	1
9	Italy (ITA)	0	0	1	1
9	Netherlands (NED)	0	0	1	1
9	Ukraine (UKR)	0	0	1	1
Totals (12 entries)		12	12	12	36

- Note: Totals include both individual and team medals, with medals in the team competition counting as one medal.
