= 2009 European Athletics U23 Championships – Men's 10,000 metres =

The men's 10,000 metres event at the 2009 European Athletics U23 Championships was held in Kaunas, Lithuania, at S. Dariaus ir S. Girėno stadionas (Darius and Girėnas Stadium) on 18 July.

== Medalists ==
Gold	Selim Bayrak; Turkey
Silver	Andrea Lalli; Italy
Bronze	Dmytro Lashyn; Ukraine

== Results ==
=== Final ===
18 July

Rank	Name	Nationality	Time	Notes
1st place, gold medalist(s)	Selim Bayrak	Turkey	29:47.15	
2nd place, silver medalist(s)	Andrea Lalli	Italy	29:49.80	
3rd place, bronze medalist(s)	Dmytro Lashyn	Ukraine	30:08.44	
4	Matti Markowski	Germany	30:30.46	
5	Iván Fernández	Spain	30:37.77	
6	Mikael Ekvall	Sweden	30:47.10	
7	Koen Naert	Belgium	31:00.73	
8	Paul Zwama	Netherlands	31:03.94	
9	Tuomas Jokinen	Finland	31:13.26	
10	Álvaro Lozano	Spain	31:33.63	
11	Muğdat Öztürk	Turkey	31:37.87	
12	Sanne Torfs	Belgium	32:08.19	
13	Leonel Fernandes	Portugal	32:20.99	
14	Łukasz Kujawski	Poland	32:37.03	
15	Alberto Lozano	Spain	32:40.29	
	Atelaw Yeshetela	Belgium	DNF	
	Alessandro D'Ascoli	Italy	DNF	
	Hasan Pak	Turkey	DNF	

== Participation ==
According to an unofficial count, 18 athletes from 11 countries participated in the event.

- Belgium (3)
- Finland (1)
- Germany (1)
- Italy (2)
- Netherlands (1)
- Poland (1)
- Portugal (1)
- Spain (3)
- Sweden (1)
- Turkey (3)
- Ukraine (1)
