= 2007 European Athletics U23 Championships – Men's 5000 metres =

The men's 5000 metres event at the 2007 European Athletics U23 Championships was held in Debrecen, Hungary, at Gyulai István Atlétikai Stadion on 12 July.

== Medalists ==
Gold	Noureddine Smaïl; France
Silver	Andrey Safronov; Russia
Bronze	Kemal Koyuncu; Turkey

== Results ==
=== Final ===
12 July

Rank	Name	Nationality	Time	Notes
1st place, gold medalist(s)	Noureddine Smaïl	France	13:53.15	
2nd place, silver medalist(s)	Andrey Safronov	Russia	13:54.04	
3rd place, bronze medalist(s)	Kemal Koyuncu	Turkey	13:54.32	
4	Yohan Durand	France	13:54.37	
5	Tiidrek Nurme	Estonia	13:57.51	
6	Mark Christie	Ireland	13:58.83	
7	Dušan Markešević	Serbia	13:58.96	
8	Joseph Sweeney	Ireland	13:59.01	
9	Andy Vernon	United Kingdom	13:59.24	
10	Stefano La Rosa	Italy	13:59.35	
11	Mario Van Waeyenberge	Belgium	14:06.56	
12	Andrea Lalli	Italy	14:07.14	
13	Kamil Murzyn	Poland	14:11.97	
14	Simone Gariboldi	Italy	14:14.25	
15	Bohdan Semenovych	Ukraine	14:18.26	
16	Radosław Kłeczek	Poland	14:20.11	
17	Kári Steinn Karlsson	Iceland	14:20.70	
18	Alexandros Kalogerogiannis	Cyprus	14:27.37	
19	João Lopes	Portugal	14:36.79	
20	Jon Thewlis	United Kingdom	14:47.27	
	Oleksandr Romanyuk	Ukraine	DNF	

== Participation ==
According to an unofficial count, 21 athletes from 14 countries participated in the event.

- Belgium (1)
- Cyprus (1)
- Estonia (1)
- France (2)
- Iceland (1)
- Ireland (2)
- Italy (3)
- Poland (2)
- Portugal (1)
- Russia (1)
- Serbia (1)
- Turkey (1)
- Ukraine (2)
- United Kingdom (2)
