= Andrea Lalli =

Italian long-distance runner (born 1987)

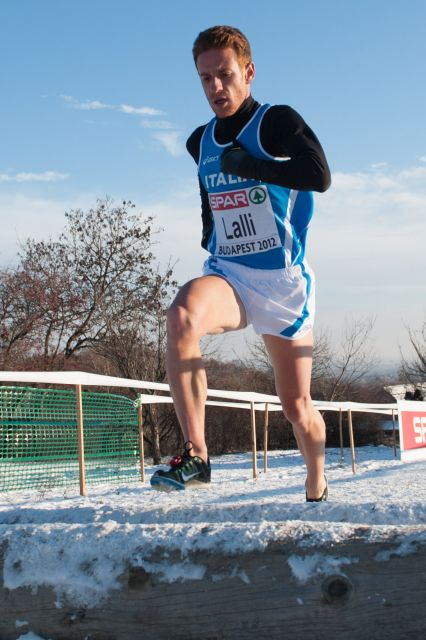

Personal information
- Born: 20 May 1987 (age 39) Florence, Italy
- Height: 1.69 m (5 ft 6 1/2 in)
- Weight: 56 kg (123 lb)

Sport
- Country: Italy
- Sport: Athletics
- Event: Long distance running
- Club: G.S. Fiamme Gialle

Achievements and titles
- Personal bests: 1500 m: 3:43.36 (2008); 3000 m: 8:03.20 (2008); 5000 m: 13:45.61 (2009); 10000 m: 28:17.64 (2010); 15 Km: 43:22 (2012); Half marathon: 1:01:11 (2012)
Medal record
European Cross Country Championships
Gold medal – first place	2012 Budapest	Cross country
European U23 Championships
Silver medal – second place	2009 Kaunas	10000 metres

Andrea Lalli (born 20 May 1987 in Florence) is an Italian long-distance runner.

== Biography ==
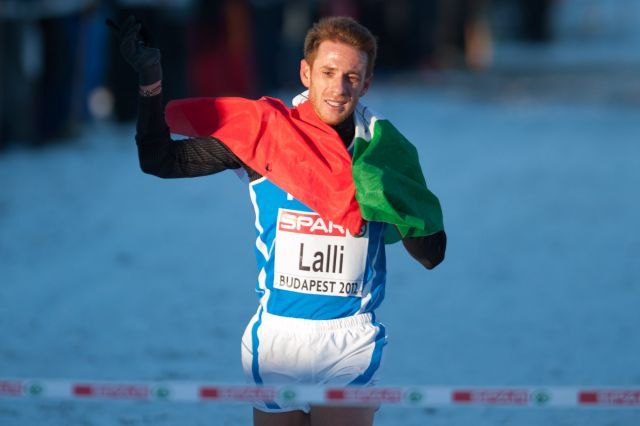
Lalli wins European Cross Country Championships in 2012

He started his career with medals at the European Cross Country Championships, taking the junior individual and team titles at the 2006 edition and then winning the under-23 title in 2008. He won his first track medal at the 2009 European Athletics U23 Championships, where he was the runner-up in the 10,000 metres behind Turkey's Mert Girmalegesse, formerly of Ethiopia. Following a win at the Lotto Cross Cup Brussels in December, Lalli formed part of the bronze medal winning Italian men's team at the 2009 European Cross Country Championships.

He claimed the short course title at the 2010 World Military Cross Country Championships in March. He ran in the 10,000 m at the 2010 European Athletics Championships and was seventh in the final, while fellow Italian Daniele Meucci reached the podium. He had a career best finish of sixth in the senior race at the 2010 European Cross Country Championships, although the Italian team was fourth at the event.

He made his debut over the half marathon at the Stramilano in March 2011 and managed to finish the course in a time of 62:32 minutes, being the first non-African finisher. This was the first time he had run the distance as, even in training, he had not exceeded 20 km. Lalli missed the rest of the 2011 season as he underwent Achilles surgery. On his return, he was the runner-up at the 2012 European Clubs Cross Country, finishing behind Ayad Lamdassem but helping his club (Fiamme Gialle) to third in the competition. At the Stramilano he came a close second to Yacob Jarso in a time of 1:01:11 hours – a personal best and the best performance by an Italian man at the event since 2002.

He won the 2012 European Cross Country Championships title convincingly with a time of 30:01, 10 seconds ahead of the runner-up Hassan Chahdi from France.

== Achievements ==
Year	Competition	Venue	Position	Event	Notes
Representing Italy
2006	World Junior Championships	Beijing, China	—	10,000 m	DNF
2007	European U23 Championships	Debrecen, Hungary	12th	5000 m	14:07.14
2008	European Cross Country Championships	Brussels, Belgium	1st	U23 race (8 km)	24:56
2008	European Cross Country Championships	Brussels, Belgium	2nd	U23 race - Team	42 pts
2009	European U23 Championships	Kaunas, Lithuania	2nd	10,000 m	29:49.80
2010	European Championships	Barcelona, Spain	7th	10,000 m	29:05.20
2010	European Cross Country Championships	Albufeira, Portugal	6th	Senior race (9.87 km)	29:28
2010	European Cross Country Championships	Albufeira, Portugal	4th	Senior race - Team	96 pts
2012	European Cross Country Championships	Budapest, Hungary	1st	Senior race (9.88 km)	30:01
2012	European Cross Country Championships	Budapest, Hungary	3rd	Senior race - Team	63 pts

== National titles ==
He won 5 times the national championship at senior level.

- Italian Athletics Championships
  - Half marathon: 2015
  - 10 km road: 2014
  - Cross country running: 2008, 2009, 2015
