= Hellen Obiri =

Kenyan middle- and long- distance runner

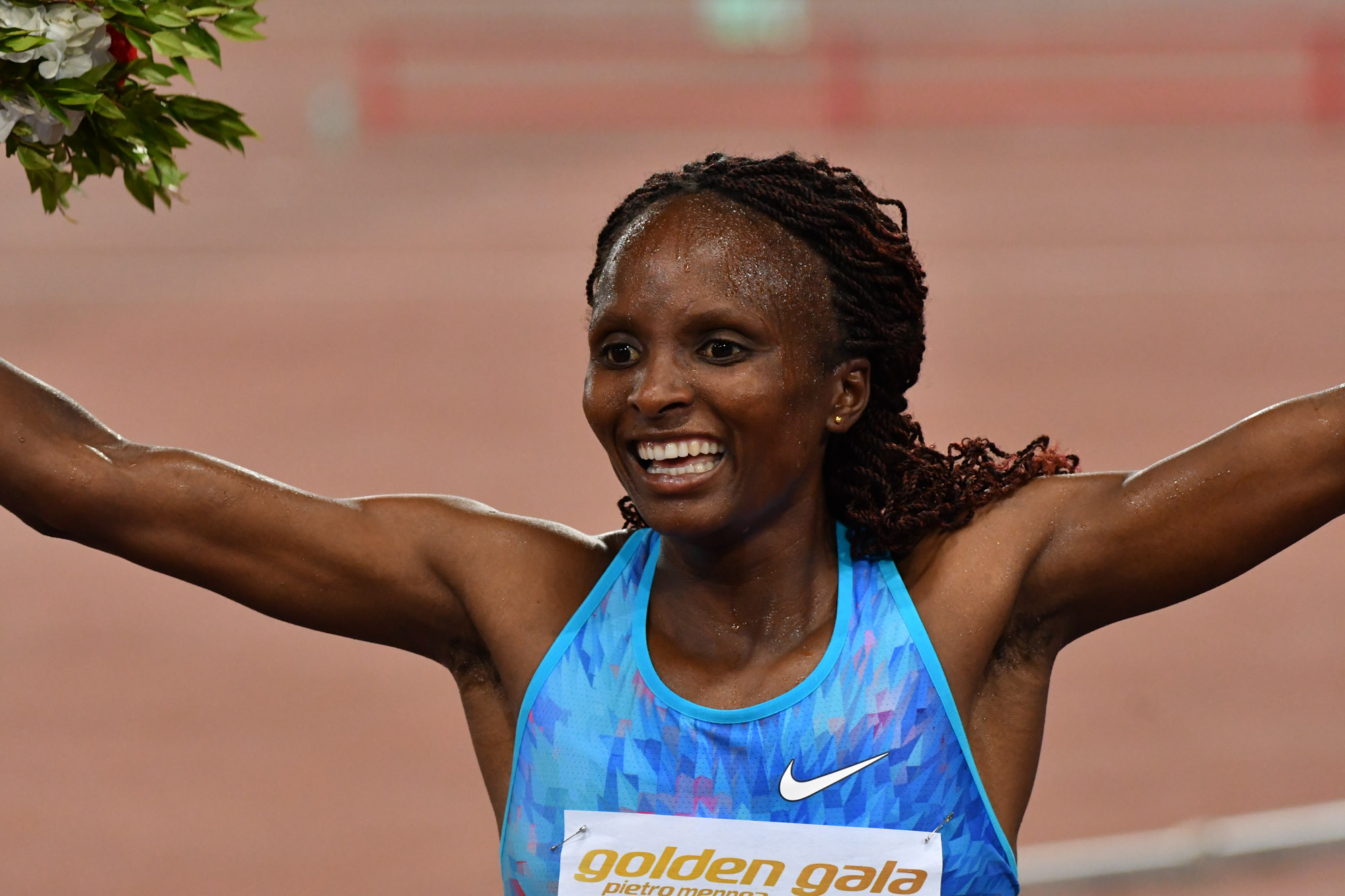
- Obiri after her win at the Golden Gala meet in Rome in 2017

Personal information
- Full name: Hellen Onsando Obiri
- Born: 13 December 1989 (age 36) Kisii, Kenya
- Height: 1.60 m (5 ft 3 in)
- Weight: 50 kg (110 lb)

Sport
- Country: Kenya
- Sport: Athletics
- Events: Middle-, Long-distance running
- Team: On Athletics Club
- Coached by: Dathan Ritzenhein (2022–); Ricky Simms (–2022)
Medal record
Women's athletics
Representing Kenya
Olympic Games
Silver medal – second place	2016 Rio de Janeiro	5000 m
Silver medal – second place	2020 Tokyo	5000 m
Bronze medal – third place	2024 Paris	Marathon
World Championships
Gold medal – first place	2017 London	5000 m
Gold medal – first place	2019 Doha	5000 m
Silver medal – second place	2022 Eugene	10,000 m
Bronze medal – third place	2013 Moscow	1500 m
World Relays
Gold medal – first place	2014 Nassau	4×1500 m relay
World Indoor Championships
Gold medal – first place	2012 Istanbul	3000 m
Silver medal – second place	2014 Sopot	3000 m
Commonwealth Games
Gold medal – first place	2018 Gold Coast	5000 m
African Championships
Gold medal – first place	2014 Marrakesh	1500 m
Gold medal – first place	2018 Asaba	5000 m
World Cross Country Championships
Gold medal – first place	2019 Aarhus	Senior race
Silver medal – second place	2019 Aarhus	Senior team
World Marathon Majors
Gold medal – first place	2023 Boston	Marathon
Gold medal – first place	2023 New York	Marathon
Gold medal – first place	2024 Boston	Marathon
Gold medal – first place	2025 New York	Marathon
Silver medal – second place	2024 New York	Marathon
Silver medal – second place	2025 Boston	Marathon
Silver medal – second place	2026 London	Marathon
Bronze medal – third place	2026 New York	Marathon

Hellen Onsando Obiri (born 13 December 1989) is a Kenyan middle- and long-distance runner. She is the only woman to have won world titles in indoor track, outdoor track and cross country. Obiri is a two-time Olympic 5,000 metres silver medallist from the 2016 Rio de Janeiro and 2020 Tokyo Olympics, where she also placed fourth over the 10,000 metres. She is a two-time world champion after winning the 5,000 m in 2017 and again in 2019, when she set a new championship record. Obiri also took world bronze for the 1,500 metres in 2013 and silver in the 10,000 m in 2022. She won the 3,000 metres race at the 2012 World Indoor Championships, claimed silver in 2014, and placed fourth in 2018. She is the 2019 World Cross Country champion. Obiri triumphed in the 2023 Boston Marathon, her second marathon race. She places fifth in the half marathon on the world all-time list.

She won a bronze medal in the 2024 Summer Olympics in the women's marathon. In addition, she won 1st place in the 2025 New York City Marathon, with a record time of 2:19:51.

Obiri is the former Kenyan national record holder for the mile and the 5000 metres, having set personal bests of 4:16.15 and 14:18.37 in the events, respectively.

Obiri was cited as one of the Top 100 most influential Africans by New African magazine in 2017.

== Early life and background ==
Hellen Onsando Obiri was born on 13 December 1989 in Kisii, Kenya. She was the fourth child in a family of six children. At age 14, she was recruited as a 200 and 400 metres sprinter to attend Riruta Central Secondary School in Nairobi. However, she lost interest in the sport and stopped running altogether in 2006 and 2007 to focus on her studies. She only re-engaged with athletics to join the military. In 2009, Obiri graduated from Kenya Defence Forces Recruit Training School in Eldoret. Her first major race was at the 2010 Kenya Armed Forces Cross Country Championships, where she finished 32nd. She placed fifth after some training the following year. She is a member of the Kenya Defense Forces (KDF).

She is married to Tom Nyaundi, a former runner, and they have a daughter, Tania 'Blessing' Macheche, born in May 2015 through caesarean section. Obiri resumed racing within seven months.

== Career ==
Obiri gained her first international experience at the 2011 Military World Games in Rio de Janeiro, where she won the bronze medal for the 800 metres and placed fourth in the 1500 metres. She debuted in the World Championships in Athletics held in 2011 in Daegu, South Korea the following month, competing at the latter distance. Obiri set a personal best time of 4:07.59 in the heats but fell in the final, bringing pre-event favourite Morgan Uceny down with her, and finished 10th. She later said, "After Daegu I went back to Kenya and started training seriously."

In 2012, the 22-year-old took her first global title at the Istanbul World Indoor Championships, clocking 8:37.16 over the 3000 metres. This became the turning point of her career. That same year, she debuted in the Olympics at the London Games, finishing initially 12th and last in the 1500 m final, upgraded to seventh after subsequent doping disqualifications.

On 1 June 2013, Obiri won her first Diamond League race with 1500 m victory in Eugene, setting a new personal best and meet record of 3:58.58. She earned bronze in the event at the World Championships in Athletics held in August in Moscow. Obiri then earned the silver medal in the 3000 m at the 2014 World Indoor Championships in Sopot, Poland, behind multiple world record-holder Genzebe Dibaba. On 9 May that year at the Doha Diamond League, she set an African record in the outdoor event with a time of 8:20.68, improving her personal best by more than 13 seconds. In August, she added 1500 m title at the African Championships.

At the 2016 Olympics in Rio de Janeiro, Obiri competed in the 5000 metres and earned the silver medal in a time of 14:29.77, behind compatriot Vivian Cheruiyot in an Olympic record of 14:26.17 and ahead of Ethiopia's Almaz Ayana who ran 14:33.59.

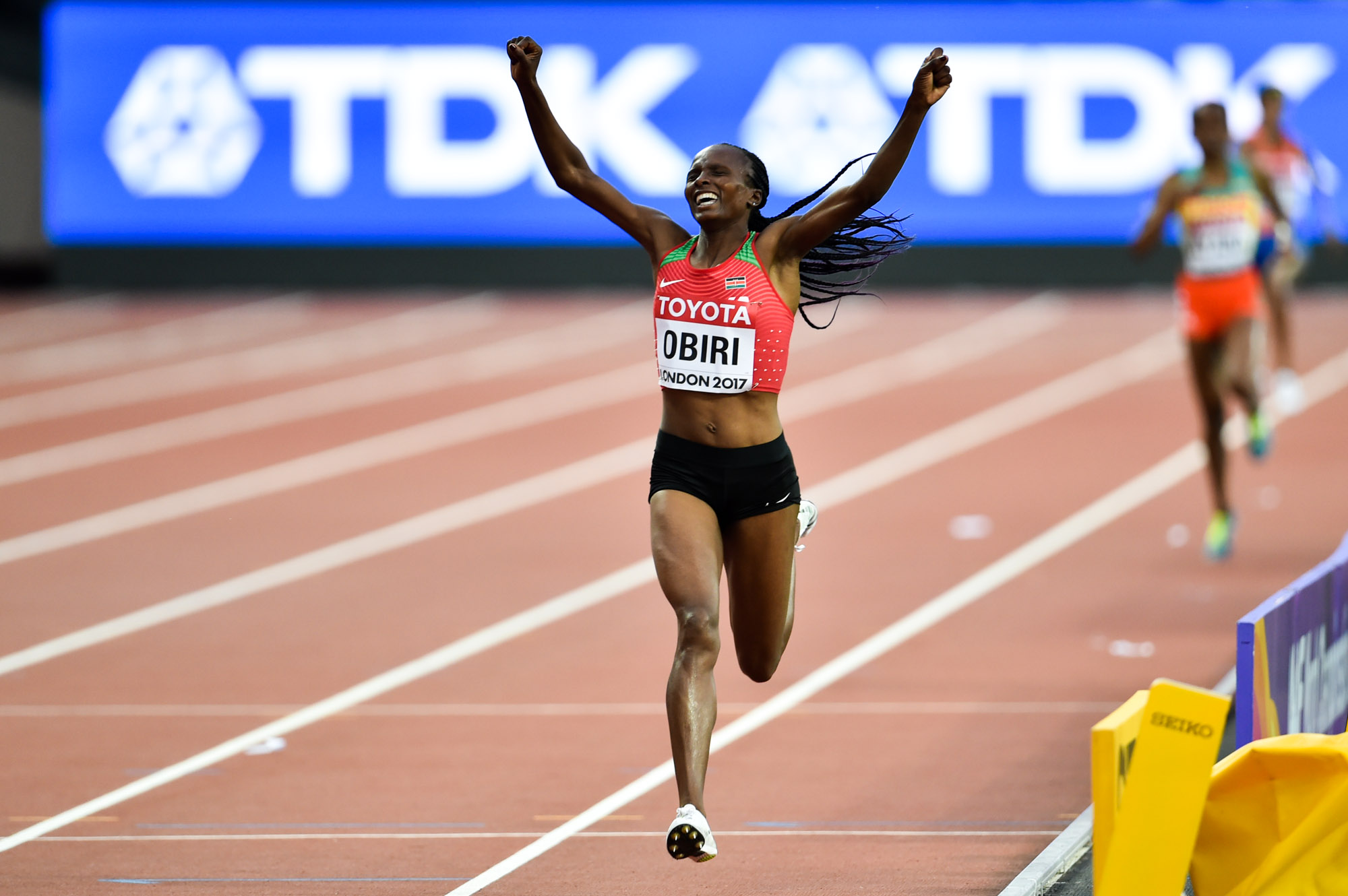
Obiri dominated the 5000 m at the 2017 World Championships in Athletics in London.

Obiri represented Kenya at the 2017 World Championships in London in the same event and won the gold medal with a time of 14:34.86, ahead of Ayana and Sifan Hassan.

2018 saw her take two more gold medals in the 5000 m events, at the Gold Coast Commonwealth Games and at the African Championships.

In March 2019, Obiri won the senior women's race at the World Cross Country Championship held in Aarhus, Denmark, beating on a 10.2 km course second-placed Dera Dida by two seconds with a time of 36:14. After she posted best female times of the year in the 5000 metres in 2017 and 2018, Obiri successfully defended her title at the Doha World Championships in October, setting a championship record of 14:26.72 in the process. Her compatriot Margaret Kipkemboi (14:27.49) and Konstanze Klosterhalfen (14:28.43) finished second and third, respectively.

Obiri represented Kenya at the 2020 Tokyo Olympics in both the women's 5000 m and 10,000 m events. She won the silver medal at the former in a time of 14:38.36, finishing behind only Hassan who ran 14:36.79; Gudaf Tsegay took bronze in 14:38.87. Obiri placed fourth in the 10,000 m final in a personal best behind, 1–3, Hassan, Kalkidan Gezahegne and Letesenbet Gidey.

At the 2022 World Championships in Eugene, Oregon, Obiri came second in the 10,000 m. She was beaten to gold by Gidey in a close finish (the top 3 were only separated by 0.13 s).

She capped her fine 2022 season (64:22 PB at the Ras Al Khaimah Half Marathon in February; wins at Istanbul Half Marathon, Great Manchester Run and Great North Run) in November debuting in the marathon at the New York City Marathon, where she placed sixth.

Obiri got her 2023 campaign off to strong start. In February, she won the RAK Half and then the New York City Half Marathon in March. On 17 April, the 33-year-old ran her second marathon, competing in the Boston Marathon against the deepest elite women's field ever assembled. She won with a personal best time of 2:21:38, 12 seconds clear of second-place finisher Amane Beriso who had by far the fastest personal best heading into the race (2:14:58). Obiri went on to win the 2023 New York City Marathon in a time of 2:25:49.

Obiri won the 2026 New York City Half Marathon in a course record time of 1:06:33.

== Achievements ==
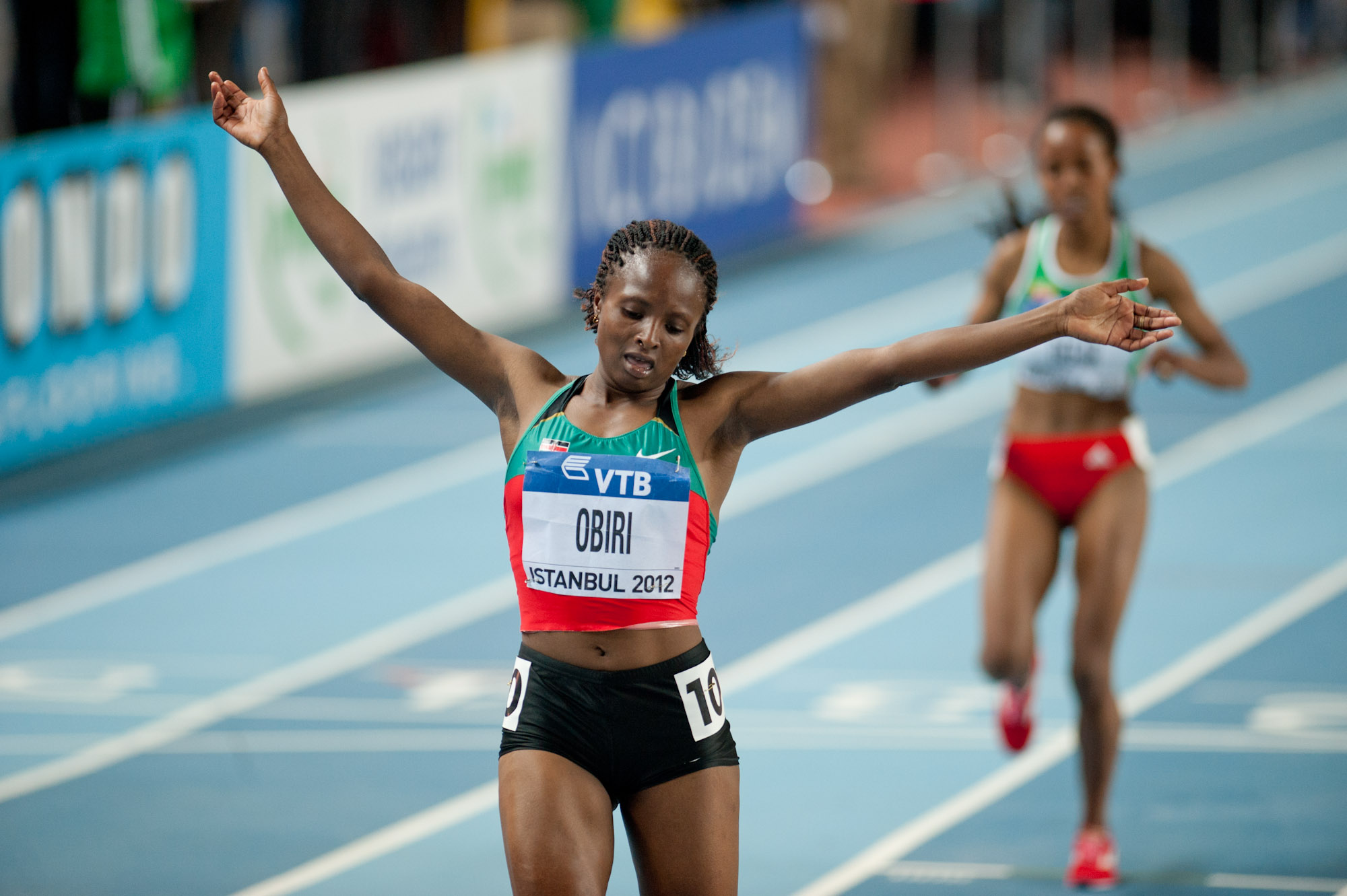
Obiri claimed her first global title with win in the 3000 m at the 2012 World Indoor Championships held in Istanbul.

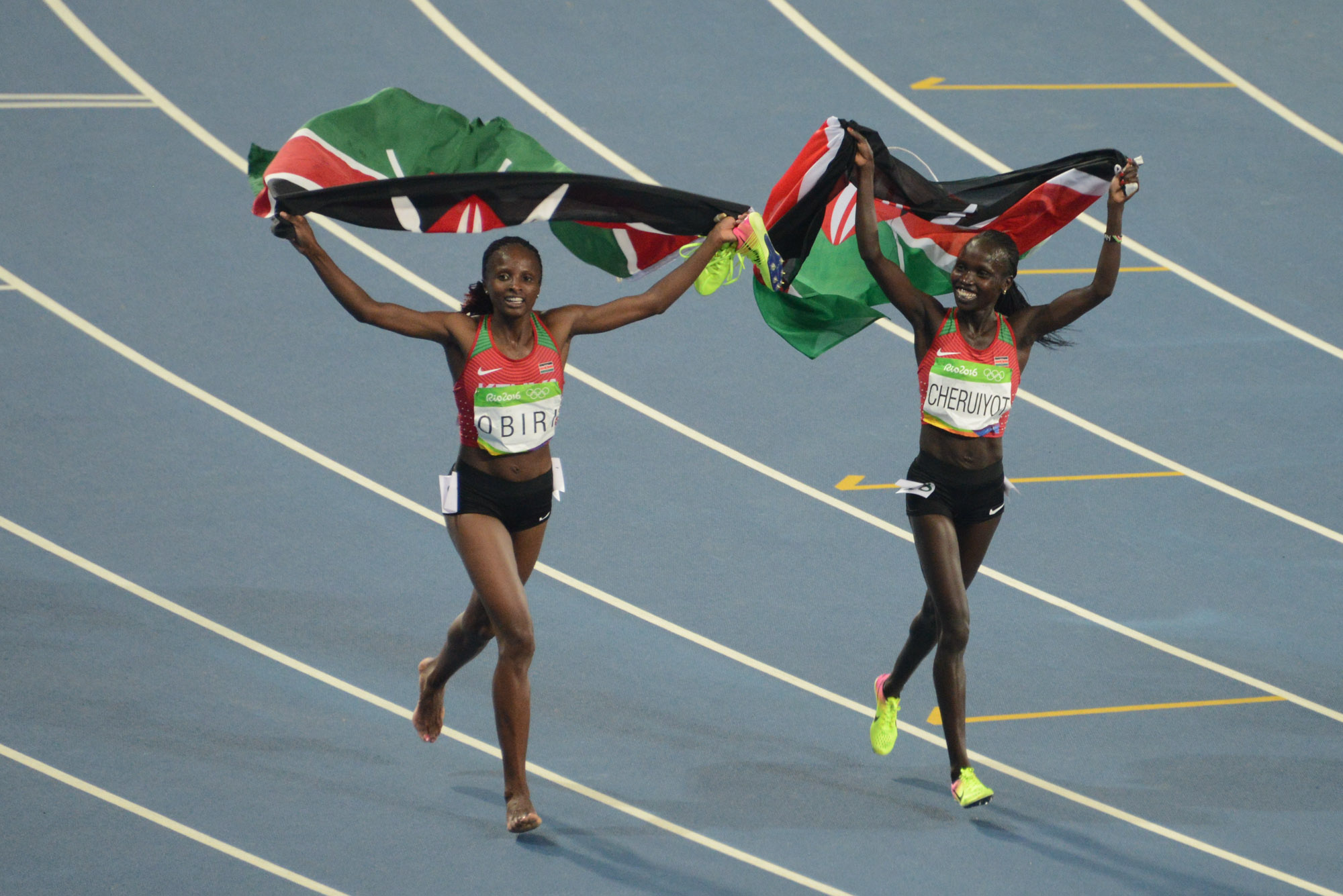
Vivian Cheruiyot (R) and Hellen Obiri (L), 1–2 in the 5000 m, celebrate their success at the 2016 Olympics.

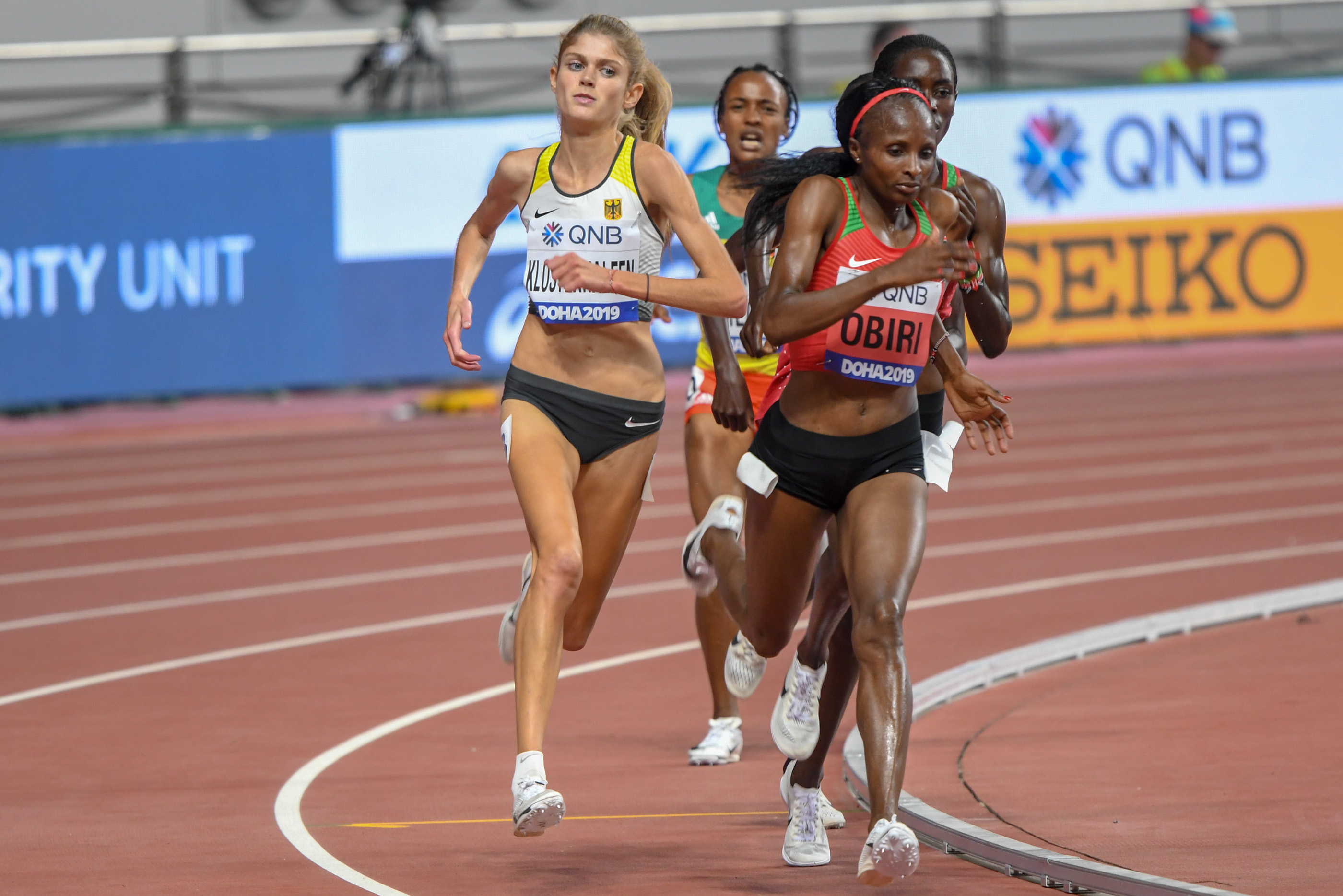
Obiri (R) en route to the 5000 m victory at the 2019 World Athletics Championships in Doha.

=== International competitions ===
Year	Competition	Venue	Position	Event	Time
Representing Kenya
2011	Military World Games	Rio de Janeiro, Brazil	3rd	800 m	2:01.86
2011	Military World Games	Rio de Janeiro, Brazil	4th	1500 m	4:19.32
2011	World Championships	Daegu, South Korea	10th	1500 m	4:20.23
2012	World Indoor Championships	Istanbul, Turkey	1st	3000 m i	8:37.16
2012	Olympic Games	London, United Kingdom	8th	1500 m	4:16.57
2013	World Championships	Moscow, Russia	3rd	1500 m	4:03.86
2014	World Indoor Championships	Sopot, Poland	2nd	3000 m i	8:57.72
2014	IAAF World Relays	Nassau, Bahamas	1st	4 × 1500 m relay	16:33.58
2014	Commonwealth Games	Glasgow, United Kingdom	6th	1500 m	4:10.84
2014	African Championships	Marrakesh, Morocco	1st	1500 m	4:09.53
2016	Olympic Games	Rio de Janeiro, Brazil	2nd	5000 m	14:29.77
2017	World Championships	London, United Kingdom	1st	5000 m	14:34.86
2018	World Indoor Championships	Birmingham, United Kingdom	4th	3000 m i	8:49.66
2018	Commonwealth Games	Gold Coast, Australia	1st	5000 m	15:13.11
2018	African Championships	Asaba, Nigeria	1st	5000 m	15:47.18
2019	World Cross Country Championships	Aarhus, Denmark	1st	Senior race	36:14
2019	World Cross Country Championships	Aarhus, Denmark	2nd	Senior team	25 pts
2019	World Championships	Doha, Qatar	1st	5000 m	14:26.72 CR
2019	World Championships	Doha, Qatar	5th	10,000 m	30:35.82
2021	Olympic Games	Tokyo, Japan	2nd	5000 m	14:38.36
2021	Olympic Games	Tokyo, Japan	4th	10,000 m	30:24.27 PB
2022	World Championships	Eugene, United States	2nd	10,000 m	30:10.02 PB
2024	Olympic Games	Paris, France	3rd	Marathon	2:23:10
Road races
2018	San Silvestre Vallecana	Madrid, Spain	2nd	10 km	29:59
2019	Great Manchester Run	Manchester, United Kingdom	1st	10 km	31:23
2020	Cursa dels Nassos	Barcelona, Spain	1st	10 km	30:53
2021	Istanbul Half Marathon	Istanbul, Turkey	3rd	Half marathon	1:04:51
2021	Weltklasse Zürich	Zurich, Switzerland	2nd	5 km	14:30
2021	Great North Run	Newcastle upon Tyne, United Kingdom	1st	Half marathon	1:07:42
2022	Ras Al Khaimah Half Marathon	Ras Al Khaimah, United Arab Emirates	2nd	Half marathon	1:04:22 PB
2022	Istanbul Half Marathon	Istanbul, Turkey	1st	Half marathon	1:04:48
2022	World 10K Bengaluru	Bangalore, India	2nd	10 km	30:44
2022	Great Manchester Run	Manchester, United Kingdom	1st	10 km	30:15 CR
2022	Great North Run	Newcastle, United Kingdom	1st	Half marathon	1:07:05
2023	Ras Al Khaimah Half Marathon	Ras Al Khaimah, United Arab Emirates	1st	Half marathon	1:05:05
2023	New York City Half Marathon	New York, United States	1st	Half marathon	1:07:21 CR
2023	Great Manchester Run	Manchester, United Kingdom	1st	10 km	31:14
World Marathon Majors
2022	New York City Marathon	New York, United States	6th	Marathon	2:25:49
2023	Boston Marathon	Boston, United States	1st	Marathon	2:21:38
2023	New York City Marathon	New York, United States	1st	Marathon	2:27:23
2024	Boston Marathon	Boston, United States	1st	Marathon	2:22:27
2024	New York City Marathon	New York, United States	2nd	Marathon	2:24:49
2025	Boston Marathon	Boston, MA, United States	2nd	Marathon	2:17:41
2025	New York City Marathon	New York, United States	1st	Marathon	2:19:51 CR
2026	London Marathon	London, United Kingdom	2nd	Marathon	2:15:53
2026	New York City Marathon	New York, United States	3rd	Marathon	2:24:43 PB
Cross country races
2022	Northern Ireland International Cross Country	Belfast, United Kingdom	1st	XC 8.0 km	26:44

=== Circuit wins and titles ===
- Diamond League champion (2) (5000 m): 2017, 2018
  - 2013 (1): Eugene Prefontaine Classic (1500m, PB MR)
  - 2014 (2): Doha Diamond League (3000m), Eugene (1500m, WL MR)
  - 2016 (2): Eugene (5000m, PB), Monaco Herculis (3000m)
  - 2017 (5): Shanghai Diamond League (5000m, WL PB), Rome Golden Gala (5000m, WL NR), London Grand Prix (Mile, MR NR), Monaco (3000m, WL), Brussels Memorial Van Damme (5000m)
  - 2018 (2): Rabat Meeting International (5000m), Weltklasse Zürich (5000m)
  - 2019 (2): Doha (3000m, WL), London (5000m, WL MR)
  - 2020 (2): Monaco (5000m, WL MR), Doha (3000m, WL)
  - 2021 (1): Oslo Bislett Games (5000m)

=== National titles ===
- Kenyan Athletics Championships
  - 1500 metres: 2011, 2012, 2013, 2014
  - 5000 metres: 2018
- Kenyan Cross Country Championships
  - Senior women's race: 2019

=== Personal bests ===
Type	Event	Time	Place	Date	Notes
Track	800 metres	2:00.54	London, United Kingdom	5 August 2011	
Track	1500 metres	3:57.05	Eugene, United States	31 May 2014	
Track	One mile	4:16.15	London, United Kingdom	22 July 2018	NR
Track	3000 metres	8:20.68	Doha, Qatar	9 May 2014	NR
Track	3000 metres indoor	8:29.41	Birmingham, United Kingdom	18 February 2017	NR
Track	Two miles	9:14.55	Eugene, United States	20 August 2021	
Track	5000 metres	14:18.37	Rome, Italy	8 June 2017	NR
Track	10,000 metres	30:10.02	Eugene, United States	16 July 2022	
Track	4 × 1500 m relay	16:33.58	Nassau, Bahamas	24 May 2014	African record
Road	5 km	14:30	Zurich, Switzerland	8 September 2021	
Road	10 km	30:15	Manchester, United Kingdom	22 May 2022	(also 29:59 not legal)
Road	Half marathon	1:04:22	Ras Al Khaimah, United Arab Emirates	19 February 2022	Mx 12th all-time
Road	Marathon	2:15:53	London, United Kingdom	26 April 2026	
