= Track and field at the 2011 Military World Games – Women's 1500 metres =

The women's 1500 metres event at the 2011 Military World Games was held on 22 July at the Estádio Olímpico João Havelange.

== Records ==
Prior to this competition, the existing world and CISM record were as follows:

World Record	Yunxia Qu (CHN)	3:50.46	Beijing, China	11 September 1993
CISM World Record	Helena Javornik (SLO)	4:07.34	Zagreb, Croatia	August 1999

== Schedule ==
Date	Time	Round
22 July 2011	17:15	Final

== Medalists ==
Gold	Silver	Bronze
Nancy Langat; Kenya	Denise Krebs; Germany	Geneb Regasa; Bahrain

== Results ==
=== Final ===
Rank	Name	Nationality	Time	Notes
1st place, gold medalist(s)	Nancy Langat	Kenya	4:15.42	
2nd place, silver medalist(s)	Denise Krebs	Germany	4:15.87	
3rd place, bronze medalist(s)	Geneb Regasa	Bahrain	4:16.31	
4	Hellen Obiri	Kenya	4:19.32	
5	Margherita Magnani	Italy	4:19.93	
6	Sanae El Otmani	Morocco	4:22.62	
7	Christiane dos Santos	Brazil	4:23.22	
8	Eirini Kokkinariou	Greece	4:24.83	
9	Shanika Samanmali	Sri Lanka	4:25.57	
10	Jackline Sakilu	Tanzania	4:27.51	
11	Tilahun Aster	Bahrain	4:27.90	
12	Sylwia Ejdys	Poland	4:31.48	
13	Champika Dilrukshi	Sri Lanka	4:35.40	
14	Pamela Labra	Chile	4:52.93	
15	Mariama Camara	Guinea	5:29.92	
	Celine Best	Canada	DNS	
	Sabine Heitling	Brazil	DNS	
	Georgette Mink	Canada	DNS	
	Seltana Ait Hammou	Morocco	DNS	
