= Albert Korir =

Kenyan long-distance runner

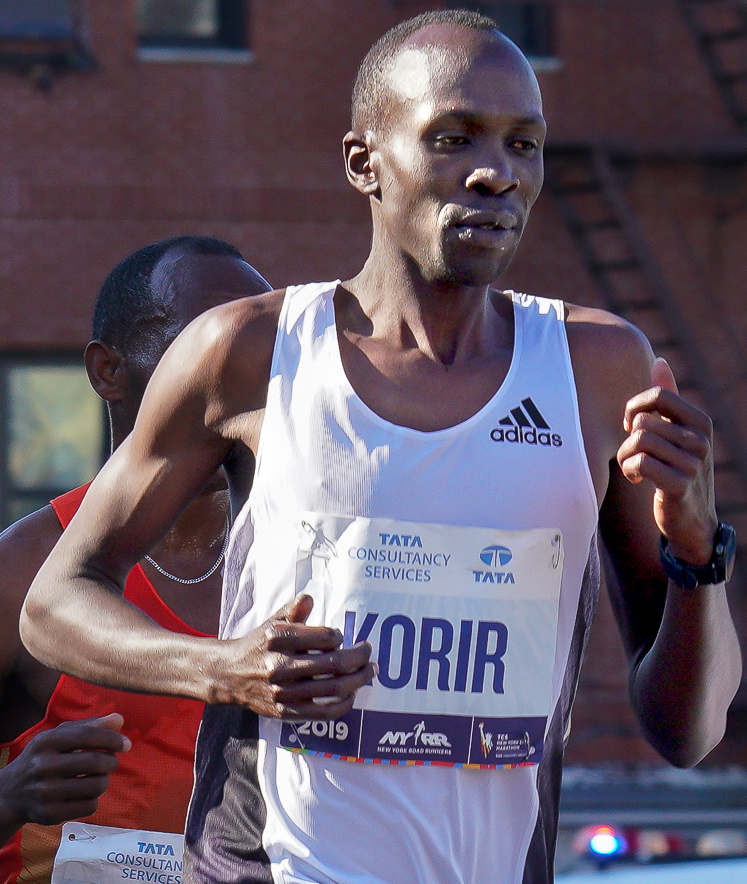
- Korir at the 2019 New York City Marathon

Personal information
- Born: 2 March 1994 (age 32)

Sport
- Country: Kenya
- Sport: Athletics
- Event: Long-distance running
Medal record
Men's athletics
Representing Kenya
World Marathon Majors
Gold medal – first place	2021 New York	Marathon
Silver medal – second place	2019 New York	Marathon
Silver medal – second place	2023 New York	Marathon
Bronze medal – third place	2024 New York	Marathon

Albert Korir (born 2 March 1994) is a Kenyan long-distance runner. Korir was the 2021 New York City Marathon champion.

Korir is currently serving a five-year ban set to expire in January 2031 for an anti-doping rule violation after testing positive for CERA.

== Career ==
In 2017, Korir won the Vienna City Marathon with a time of 2:08:40.

In 2019, he won the Houston Marathon with a time of 2:10:02. In this year he also won the marathon event of the Ottawa Race Weekend with a new personal best of 2:08:03. In November 2019, he finished in 2nd place in the New York City Marathon with a time of 2:08:36.

Korir won the 2021 New York City Marathon with a time of 2:08:22.

In March 2026, Korir was issued with a five-year ban by the Athletics Integrity Unit backdated to 8 January 2026, after admitting to using and testing positive for CERA, a banned performance-enhancing drug. The AIU stated "clear evidence of the athlete's use of a prohibited substance on multiple occasions". In addition, his results from 3 October 2025, were disqualified, including his 2025 New York City Marathon third-place finish.

== Achievements ==
Year	Competition	Venue	Position	Event	Notes
Representing Kenya
2016	Barcelona Marathon	Barcelona, Spain	2nd	Marathon	2:10:08
2016	Toronto Waterfront Marathon	Toronto, Canada	3rd	Marathon	2:10:21
2017	Vienna City Marathon	Vienna, Austria	1st	Marathon	2:08:40
2017	Ljubljana Marathon	Ljubljana, Slovenia	3rd	Marathon	2:10:35
2018	Lake Biwa Mainichi Marathon	Otsu, Japan	2nd	Marathon	2:08:17
2018	Cape Town Marathon	Cape Town, South Africa	2nd	Marathon	2:09:02
2019	Houston Marathon	Houston, TX, United States	1st	Marathon	2:10:02
2019	Ottawa Race Weekend	Ottawa, ON, Canada	1st	Marathon	2:08:03
2019	New York City Marathon	New York, NY, United States	2nd	Marathon	2:08:36
2021	New York City Marathon	New York, NY, United States	1st	Marathon	2:08:22
2022	Boston Marathon	Boston, MA, United States	6th	Marathon	2:08:50
2022	New York City Marathon	New York, NY, United States	7th	Marathon	2:13:27
2023	Boston Marathon	Boston, MA, United States	4th	Marathon	2:08:01
2023	New York City Marathon	New York, NY, United States	2nd	Marathon	2:06:57
2024	Boston Marathon	Boston, MA, United States	5th	Marathon	2:07:47
2024	New York City Marathon	New York, NY, United States	3rd	Marathon	2:08:00
2025	Ottawa Race Weekend	Ottawa, ON, Canada	1st	Marathon	2:08:22
2025	New York City Marathon	New York, NY, United States	3rd	Marathon	2:08:57
