= David McCarthy (long-distance runner) =

Irish distance runner (born 1988)

Personal information
- Born: August 3, 1988 (age 37) Waterford
- Height: 1.80 m (5 ft 11 in)

Sport
- Event: 5000 metres
- College team: Providence College
- Club: West Waterford AC
- Now coaching: Ray Treacy
Medal record
Men's Athletics
Representing Ireland
European Under-23 Athletics Championships
Bronze medal – third place	Kaunas 2009	5000m
- Updated on 12 Jan 2010

David McCarthy (born 3 August 1988 in Waterford, Ireland) is a middle-distance athlete who has won international medals.

After being voted Irish athlete of the month for April 2009, McCarthy won the bronze medal in the men's 5000 metres at the 2009 European Under-23 Athletics Championships in Kaunas, Lithuania - the only Irish medal of the Championships.

McCarthy's third-place finish saw him beaten by gold-medallist Mohamed Elbendir of Spain and French athlete Noureddine Smaïl - both of whom were African-born.

Coached by Ray Treacy, brother of 1984 Olympic marathon silver-medallist John Treacy, McCarthy as of the 2009-10 semester attends Providence College.
