= Axumawit Embaye =

Ethiopian middle-distance runner (born 1994)

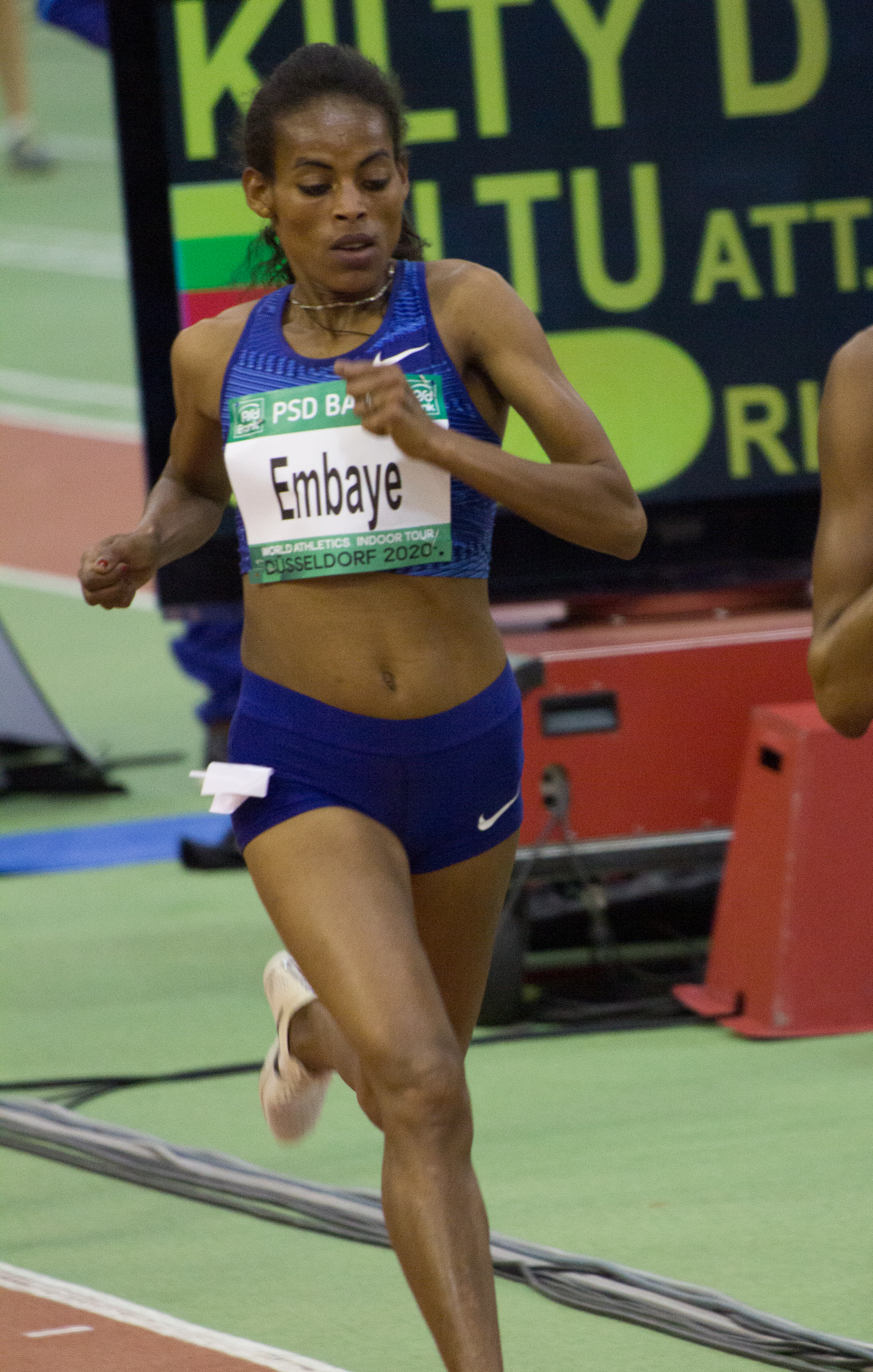
- Axumawit Embaye at the 2020 PSD Bank Meeting in Dusseldorf

Personal information
- Full name: Axumawit Alem Embaye
- Nationality: Ethiopian
- Born: 18 October 1994 (age 31)

Sport
- Country: Ethiopia
- Sport: Athletics
- Event: 1500 metres

Achievements and titles
- Personal best(s): 1500 m: 3:59.02 (2019); Indoors; 1500 m: 4:02.12 (2022)
Medal record
Women's athletics
Representing Ethiopia
World Indoor Championships
Silver medal – second place	2014 Sopot	1500 m
Silver medal – second place	2022 Belgrade	1500 m

Axumawit Alem Embaye (Amharic: አክሱማዊት አምባዬ; born 18 October 1994) is an Ethiopian middle-distance runner, who specialises in the 1500 metres. She is a two-time World Indoor Championship silver medallist from 2014 and 2022.

== Career ==
Axumawit Embaye made her first major appearances in 2012. She was runner-up in the 800 m at the Ethiopian junior championships and ended up seventh at the 2012 World Junior Championships in Athletics, recording a personal best of 4:12.92 minutes. She switched to the 1500 metres for the 2013 season and performed well on the European circuit. She ran a best of 4:09.11 minutes at the XL Galan indoors to place second and had a string of runner-up placings outdoors at the Bislett Games, Folksam Grand Prix and the KBC Night of Athletics (she set a personal best of 4:05.16 minutes at the latter event).

Top three placings at the PSD Bank Meeting and Weltklasse in Karlsruhe at the start of the next year brought her a place on the team for the 2014 World Indoor Championships in the 1500 metres event. She was second to Abebe Aregawi in the heats and repeated that feat in the final; although Abebe comfortably won the race, Axumawit stayed ahead of the rest of the pack to take the silver medal.

She placed fourth in her specialist event at the 2016 IAAF World Indoor Championships held in Portland, Oregon. Sifan Hassan was the winner while Dawit Seyaum and Gudaf Tsegay finished second and third, respectively.

At the 2019 World Championships in Doha, Axumawit was eliminated in the heats of the women's 1500m event.

In 2022, Axumawit repeated her achievement from 2014 winning 1500m silver at the World Indoor Championships in Belgrade, clocking 4:02.29. Her compatriot Tsegay led an Ethiopian medals sweep in 3:57.19 as Hirut Meshesha finished third (4:03.39).

== Competition record ==
Representing Ethiopia
Year	Competition	Venue	Position	Event	Time
2012	2012 World Junior Championships	Barcelona, Spain	7th	1500 m	4:12.92 PB
2014	World Indoor Championships	Sopot, Poland	2nd	1500 m i	4:07.12 PB
2014	African Championships	Marrakesh, Morocco	4th	1500 m	4:13.27
2016	World Indoor Championships	Portland, United States	4th	1500 m i	4:09.37
2019	World Championships	Doha, Qatar	23rd (h)	1500 m	4:08.56
2022	World Indoor Championships	Belgrade, Serbia	2nd	1500 m i	4:02.29

=== Personal bests ===
- 1500 metres – 3:59.02 (2019)
  - 1500 metres indoor – 4:02.12 (2022)
- One mile – 4:18.58 (2019)
  - One mile indoor – 4:23.50 (2015)
- 3000 metres – 8:40.20 (2025)
  - 3000 metres indoor – 8:49.52 (2017)
