= Kate Grace =

American middle-distance runner (born 1988)

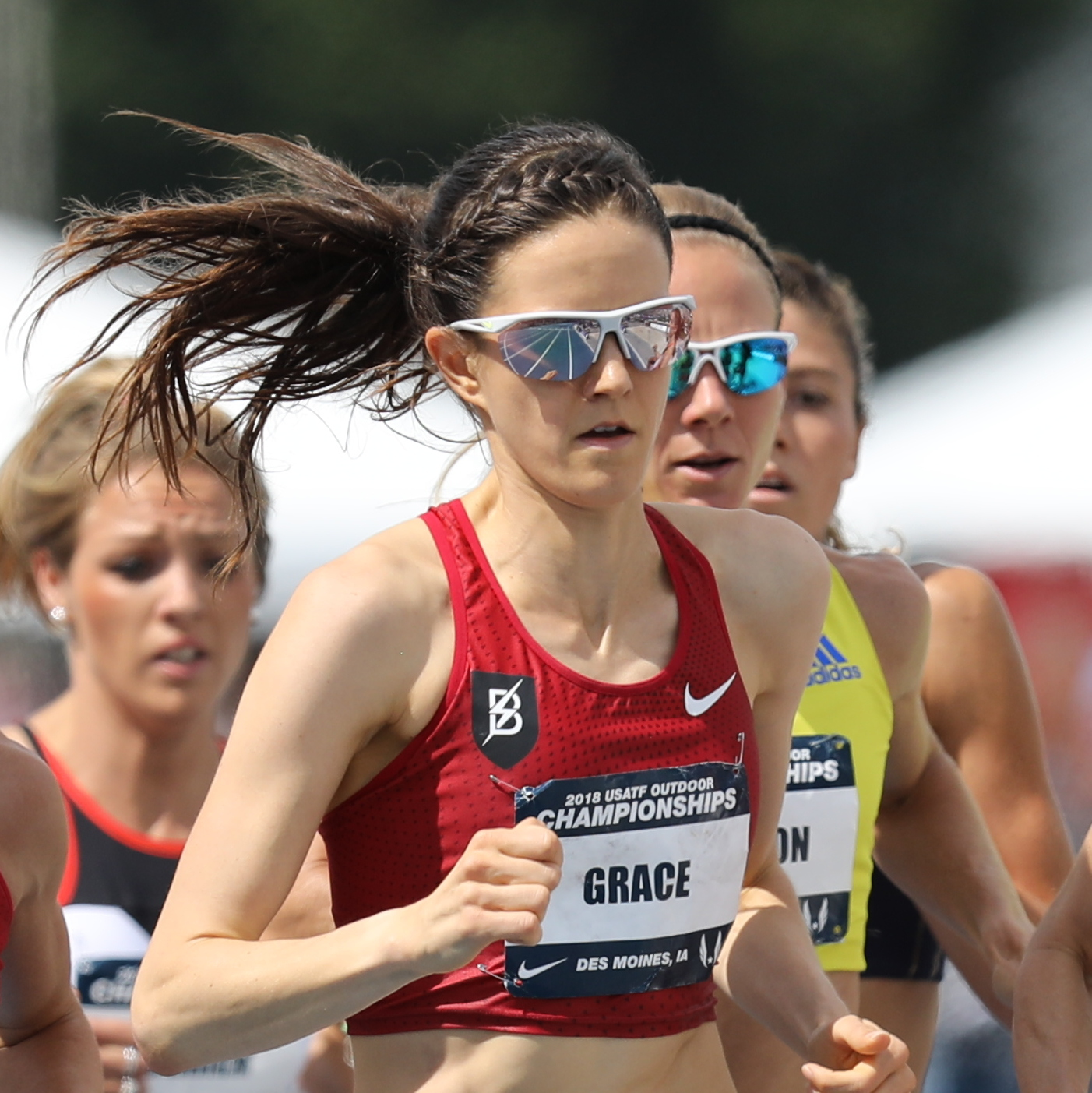
- Grace in 2018

Personal information
- Born: October 24, 1988 (age 38)
- Height: 5 ft 8 in (173 cm)
- Weight: 122 lb (55 kg)

Sport
- Country: United States
- Events: 1500 metres, 800 metres
- College team: Yale Bulldogs
- Club: Nike
- Turned pro: 2011
- Coached by: Self

Achievements and titles
- Personal bests: 800 m: 1:57.20 (2021); 1500 m: 4:01.33 (2021); Mile: 4:20.70 (2018)
Medal record
Women's athletics
Representing the United States
NACAC Championships in Athletics
Gold medal – first place	2018 Toronto	1500 m
World Relay Championships
Silver medal – second place	2014 Nassau	4 × 1500 m relay

Kate Grace (born October 24, 1988) is an American middle-distance runner. A multiple All-American runner for Yale University, she turned professional in 2011. Grace competed for the United States at the 2016 Summer Olympics, making it to the final of the 800 metres.

== Prep ==
Grace was a multiple-league champion in high school for Marlborough School in Los Angeles. She won 2005, 2006 and 2007 CIF Southern Section Division IV 800 metres titles and placed 3rd at 800 meters in the CIF State Track and Field Championships in 2006. She set a high school personal best of 2:10.31 at Cerritos College in 2006.

As a senior, Grace won the 2006 CIF Southern Section Division IV Cross country running title, qualified to California Interscholastic Federation State Cross country running Championships, Grace led Marlborough to a team CIF State Cross country running Championship title, won CIF state cross country division four championships title in 18:24.

== College ==
Attending Yale University, Grace broke four school records, won six Heps championships (one as a member of a relay team), and was a four-time NCAA Division I Track and Field and Cross country All-American. She graduated from Yale in 2011 with a degree in environmental studies, where she was a member of Skull and Bones.

=== NCAA championships ===
==== Outdoor track and field ====
Year	Competition	Venue	Position	Event	Notes
Representing Yale
2009	NCAA Outdoor Track and Field Championships	Fayetteville, Arkansas	17th	800 m	2:08.50
2010	NCAA Outdoor Track and Field Championships	Eugene, Oregon	7th	800 m	2:05.92
2011	NCAA Outdoor Track and Field Championships	Des Moines, Iowa	5th	800 m	2:04.22

==== Indoor track and field ====
Year	Competition	Venue	Position	Event	Notes
Representing Yale
2009	NCAA Indoor Track and Field Championships	College Station, Texas	8th	800 m	2:07.77
2011	NCAA Indoor Track and Field Championships	College Station, Texas	13th	Mile	4:43:07

== Professional ==
Grace joined the New Jersey-New York Track Club in 2011, training under legendary coach Frank "Gags" Gagliano.

In 2012, Grace signed with Oiselle, a running apparel company based out of Seattle. Grace was the first runner that Oiselle signed, preceding an eventual full roster of professional runners, including Kara Goucher and Lauren Fleshman. Grace competed in the 800 and 1,500 meters at the 2012 Olympic Trials, but placed 20th in the 1500 and did not qualify for the final.

While working with Gagliano, Grace continued to improve her times on the track and won the 2013 USA road mile championship — her first national title. Grace won the 2013 USA 1 Mile Road Championship Grand Blue Mile. She placed 4th in the 800 meters at the 2013 USA Outdoor Track and Field Championships.

Grace placed 11th in the 1500 meters in the 2014 USA Outdoor Track and Field Championships in Sacramento, California. Grace was part of Team USA setting an American and North American record at the 2014 IAAF World Relays – Women's 4 × 1500 metres relay in 16:55.33. In 2014, Grace left New Jersey and Gagliano for Bend, Oregon where she began to train with Lauren Fleshman.

In 2015, Grace battled foot injuries that took her out of the racing season. She moved to Sacramento, California in July 2015 to join the NorCal Distance Project.

Grace ran 4:06.75 in the 1500 meters at the 2016 New Balance Indoor Grand Prix – a time qualifier for Athletics at the 2016 Summer Olympics. Grace was second in the New York Armory Women's Mile Elite – New Balance Games 2016 after leading teammate Kim Conley for 1500 meters.

Grace placed first in the 800 m at the 2016 United States Olympic Track and Field Trials, making her first Olympic team. She competed for the US in Rio, where she set a personal best of 1:58.79 in the semifinal. Grace ultimately placed eighth in the 800 metres final.

Grace placed 5th in 4:22.7 at the 2016 Fifth Avenue Mile. Grace improved her personal best to 1:58.28 at Weltklasse Zürich of 2016 IAAF Diamond League in a fifth-place finish.

In January 2017, Grace moved to Nike as a sponsored athlete. She wore the Nike kit for the first time in competition during the University of Washington Invitational. Grace ran a personal best 4:22.93 mile on February 11, 2017, at the Millrose Games. Grace placed second in 1000 meters in 2:36.97 at 2017 Indoor muller Grand Prix at Birmingham behind Laura Muir. Grace won the 800 meters in 2:01.25 at the 2017 Portland Twilight. Grace placed third in 1500 meters in 4:16.62 at 2017 Drake Relays behind Jennifer Simpson and Brenda Martinez. Grace placed 7th in the 1500 meters in 4:03.59 in Eugene at 2017 Prefontaine Classic on May 27. Grace placed second in a time of 4:06.95 in the 1500 meters final at 2017 USA Outdoor Track and Field Championships. Grace placed 23rd in the 1500 semifinal in a time of 4:16.70 of the 2017 World Championships.

In September 2017, Grace joined Coach Jerry Schumacher and the Bowerman Track Club.

In February 2018, Grace placed second behind teammate Colleen Quigley in the Wanamaker Mile at Millrose Games. In August 2018, Grace set a championship record in winning the 2018 NACAC Championships 1500 m in 4:06.23 at the Varsity Stadium, Toronto.

In July 2019, Grace won The Match Europe v USA 1500 m in 4:02.49. Grace scored nine points to help Team USA win in Minsk at Dinamo National Olympic Stadium.

In early 2021, Grace announced her departure from Bowerman Track Club on Instagram and soon after joined Team Boss, coached by Joe Bosshard. Grace competed at the 2021 US Olympic Trials, but did not qualify for the 2020 Summer Olympics in Tokyo. However, she won the 800m Wanda Diamond League in Oslo, won the Millicent Fawcett Mile in Gateshead, ran three personal bests over the course of the summer in the 800 m, got second place in the Wanda Diamond League Final, and finished the year in third place in the World Athletics rankings for the event in her most successful season to date.

After a nearly a three year hiatus from competition due to long COVID and pregnancy, Grace returned to racing in 2024. She placed 8th in the final of the 800m at the 2024 U.S. Olympic Trials.

== Personal life ==
Grace is the daughter of fitness instructor and entrepreneur Kathy Smith.

Grace and her husband have one son, River, born in March 2023.

== Competition record ==
=== USA National Championships ===
==== Road ====
Year	Competition	Venue	Position	Event	Notes
2013	USA 1 Mile Championships	Des Moines, Iowa	1st	Mile	4:43.02

==== Track and Field ====
Year	Competition	Venue	Position	Event	Notes
2012	US Olympic Trials	Eugene, Oregon	20th	800 m	2:04.28
2012	US Olympic Trials	Eugene, Oregon	20th	1500 m	4:12.92
2013	USA Outdoor Track and Field Championships	Des Moines, Iowa	4th	800 m	2:00.10
2014	USA Outdoor Track and Field Championships	Sacramento, California	11th	1500 m	4:18.97
2014	USA Indoor Track and Field Championships	Albuquerque, New Mexico	19th	1500 m	4:36.46
2016	US Olympic Trials	Eugene, Oregon	1st	800 m	1:59.10
2016	2016 Summer Olympics	Rio de Janeiro	8th	800 m	1:59.57
2017	USA Outdoor Track and Field Championships	Sacramento, California	2nd	1500 m	4:06.95
2018	USA Indoor Track and Field Championships	Albuquerque, New Mexico	10th	1500 m	4:26.70
2018	USA Outdoor Track and Field Championships	Des Moines, Iowa	3rd	1500 m	4:07.04
2019	USA Indoor Track and Field Championships	Staten Island, New York	10th	Mile	4:36.08
2019	USA Outdoor Track and Field Championships	Des Moines, Iowa	5th	1500 m	4:03.08
2021	US Olympic Trials	Eugene, Oregon	7th	800 m	1:59.17
2024	US Olympic Trials	Eugene, Oregon	8th	800 m	2:02.37

== Personal bests ==
Surface	Event	Time	Date	Location
Outdoor track	800 m	1:57.20	July 9, 2021	Diamond League, Monaco
Outdoor track	1500 m	4:01.33	September 12, 2021	Berlin, Germany
Indoor track	800 m	2:02.29	January 28, 2017	Dempsey Indoor Track, Seattle
Indoor track	1500 m	4:04.86	February 11, 2017	Millrose Games New York City
Indoor track	Mile	4:22.93	February 11, 2017	Millrose Games New York City
Indoor track	3000 m	8:47.26	January 14, 2017	Dempsey Indoor Track, Seattle, Washington
Road	Mile	4:22.7	September 3, 2016	New York Road Runners New York City
