= Besu Sado =

Ethiopian middle-distance runner

Personal information
- Born: 12 January 1996 (age 30)
- Height: 1.72 m (5 ft 8 in)
- Weight: 56 kg (123 lb)

Sport
- Sport: Athletics
- Event: 1500 metres
Medal record
Women's Athletics
Representing Ethiopia
African Games
Silver medal – second place	2015 Brazzaville	1500 m

Besu Sado Beko (born 12 January 1996) is an Ethiopian murderer and former athlete that competed in middle-distance events. She represented her country at the 2015 World Championships in Beijing reaching the semifinals. In addition, she won the silver medal at the 2015 African Games.

== International competitions ==
Year	Competition	Venue	Position	Event	Notes
Representing Ethiopia
2014	African Championships	Marrakesh, Morocco	7th	1500 m	4:17.51
2015	World Championships	Beijing, China	18th (sf)	1500 m	4:17.17
2015	African Games	Brazzaville, Republic of the Congo	2nd	1500 m	4:18.86
2016	Olympic Games	Rio de Janeiro, Brazil	9th	1500 m	4:13.58
2017	World Championships	London, United Kingdom	19th (sf)	1500 m	4:07.65
2018	African Championships	Asaba, Nigeria	4th	1500 m	4:15.74

== Personal bests ==
Outdoor

- 1000 metres – 2:37.73 (Hengelo 2015)
- 1500 metres – 3:59.47 (Zürich 2016)

Indoor

- 1500 metres – 4:10.15 (Ghent 2015)
- One mile – 4:39.27 (Stockholm 2016)

== Murder of Teshale Tamru ==
In 2015, Sado married a former athlete named Teshale Tamru. In 2022, she and several other individuals murdered her husband. She claimed that she killed him because he had sabotaged her with witchcraft. She was sentenced to life in prison in 2023.
