= Athletics at the 2015 African Games – Women's 1500 metres =

The women's 1500 metres event at the 2015 African Games was held on 17 September.

== Results ==
Rank	Name	Nationality	Time	Notes
1st place, gold medalist(s)	Dawit Seyaum	Ethiopia	4:16.69	
2nd place, silver medalist(s)	Beso Sado	Ethiopia	4:18.86	
3rd place, bronze medalist(s)	Beatrice Chepkoech	Kenya	4:19.16	
4	Amina Bakhit	Sudan	4:20.32	SB
5	Caroline Chepkemoi	Kenya	4:20.87	
6	Winfred Mbithe	Kenya	4:21.24	
7	Kokeb Tesfaye	Ethiopia	4:22.80	
8	Caster Semenya	South Africa	4:23.00	
9	Neide Dias	Angola	4:27.30	SB
10	Merhawit Ghide	Eritrea	4:28.24	
11	Tsepiang Sello	Lesotho	4:34.89	SB
12	Leo Bafoundissa Missamou	Republic of the Congo	4:36.30	
13	Mokulube Makatisi	Lesotho	4:38.45	
14	Elizabet Nabiala Nkengue	Republic of the Congo	5:00.15	SB
	Elvanie Nymbona	Burundi	DNS	
	Jina Mam Remeo Ojinga	South Sudan	DNS	
