= Viola Cheptoo Lagat =

Kenyan middle-distance runner

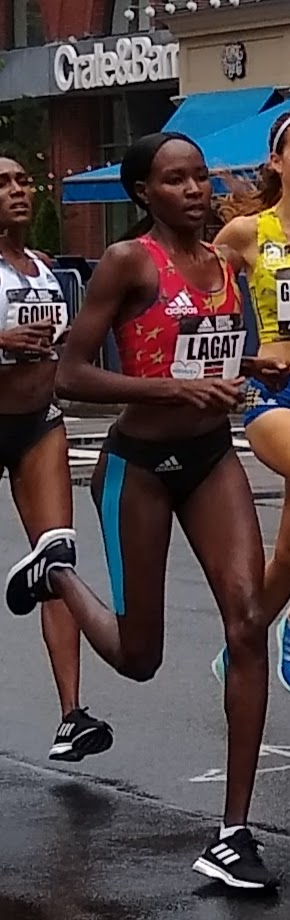
- Lagat running the Back Bay Mile at the Adidas Boost Boston Games in 2019.

Personal information
- Born: 13 March 1989 (age 37) Kipsirwo, Kenya
- Height: 1.65 m (5 ft 5 in)

Sport
- Country: Kenya
- Sport: Track and field
- College team: Florida State Seminoles
- Updated on 29 August 2015

Viola Cheptoo Lagat (born 13 March 1989) is a Kenyan long-distance runner specialising in the Marathon. Viola previously specialized in the 1500 metres, competing at the 2015 World Championships, 2016 World Indoor Championships and 2016 Summer Olympics. After transitioning to the marathon, Viola has since competed three times at the New York City Marathon, twice at the Boston Marathon, once at the Berlin Marathon, and once at the Tokyo Marathon.

She comes from a family of runners that includes sisters Mary Chepkemboi and Everlyne Lagat as well as brothers Robert Cheseret and Olympic medalist Bernard Lagat.

== Competition record ==
Year	Competition	Venue	Position	Event	Notes
Representing Kenya
2015	World Championships	Beijing, China	28th (h)	1500 m	4:12.15
2016	World Indoor Championships	Portland, United States	8th	1500 m	4:10.45
2016	Olympic Games	Rio de Janeiro, Brazil	14th (sf)	1500 m	4:06.83
2020	Napoli City Half Marathon	Naples, Italy	1st	Half marathon	1:06:47
2021	New York City Marathon	New York, New York	2nd	Marathon	2:22:44
2022	Boston Marathon	Boston, Massachusetts	6th	Marathon	2:23:47
2022	New York City Marathon	New York, New York	5th	Marathon	2:25:34
2023	Boston Marathon	Boston, Massachusetts	13th	Marathon	2:24:49
2023	New York City Marathon	New York, New York	6th	Marathon	2:28:11
2025	Boston Marathon	Boston, Massachusetts	14th	Marathon	2:25:23
2025	Berlin Marathon	Berlin, Germany	4th	Marathon	2:21:40
2026	Tokyo Marathon	Tokyo, Japan	6th	Marathon	2:19:05

== Personal bests ==
Outdoor

- 800 metres – 2:02.05 (Tomblaine 2015)
- 1000 metres – 2:42.58 (Linz 2013)
- 1500 metres – 4:04.10 (Lignano Sabbiadoro 2015)
- One mile – 4:28.82 (Rovereto 2016)
- 3000 metres – 8:52.34 (Rieti 2013)
- 5000 metres – 15:35.12 (Palo Alto 2014)
- 10000 metres – 31:11.09 (Stockholm 2021)
- Half marathon – 1:06:47 (Napoli City Half Marathon 2020)
- Marathon – 2:19:05 (2026 Tokyo Marathon)

Indoor

- 1000 metres – 2:40.72 (Boston 2014)
- 1500 metres – 4:10.45 (Portland 2016)
- One mile – 4:29.87 (New York 2016)
