= 2014 World Junior Championships in Athletics – Women's 1500 metres =

The women's 1500 metres event at the 2014 World Junior Championships in Athletics was held in Eugene, Oregon, USA, at Hayward Field on 25 and 27 July.

== Medalists ==
Gold	Dawit Seyaum; Ethiopia
Silver	Gudaf Tsegay; Ethiopia
Bronze	Sheila Chepngetich Keter; Kenya

== Records ==
Standing records prior to the 2014 World Junior Championships in Athletics
World Junior Record	Lang Yinglai (CHN)	3:51.34	Shanghai, China	18 October 1997
Championship Record	Faith Chepngetich Kipyegon (KEN)	4:04.96	Barcelona, Spain	15 July 2012
World Junior Leading	Dawit Seyaum (ETH)	3:59.53	Marrakesh, Morocco	8 June 2014
Broken records during the 2014 World Junior Championships in Athletics

== Results ==
=== Final ===
27 July
Start time: 15:54 Temperature: 28 °C Humidity: 37 %

Rank	Name	Nationality	Time	Notes
1st place, gold medalist(s)	Dawit Seyaum	Ethiopia	4:09.86	
2nd place, silver medalist(s)	Gudaf Tsegay	Ethiopia	4:10.83	
3rd place, bronze medalist(s)	Sheila Chepngetich Keter	Kenya	4:11.21	PB
4	Elise Cranny	United States	4:12.82	
5	Sofia Ennaoui	Poland	4:13.06	
6	Alexa Efraimson	United States	4:13.31	
7	Winfred Mbithe	Kenya	4:13.80	PB
8	Bobby Clay	United Kingdom	4:16.47	SB
9	Katelyn Ayers	Canada	4:17.01	PB
10	Cassandre Beaugrand	France	4:17.04	PB
11	Amy Griffiths	United Kingdom	4:17.54	
12	Anna Laman	Australia	4:18.70	

Intermediate times:
400m: 1:08.96 Gudaf Tsegay
800m: 2:17.13 Dawit Seyaum
1200m: 3:23.91 Dawit Seyaum

=== Heats ===
25 July
First 4 in each heat (Q) and the next 4 fastest (q) advance to the Final

==== Summary ====
Rank	Name	Nationality	Time	Notes
1	Dawit Seyaum	Ethiopia	4:14.72	Q
2	Sofia Ennaoui	Poland	4:15.07	Q
3	Winfred Mbithe	Kenya	4:15.12	Q PB
4	Elise Cranny	United States	4:15.21	Q
5	Gudaf Tsegay	Ethiopia	4:15.62	Q
6	Sheila Chepngetich Keter	Kenya	4:16.13	Q
7	Amy Griffiths	United Kingdom	4:16.22	q
8	Bobby Clay	United Kingdom	4:16.56	Q SB
9	Alexa Efraimson	United States	4:16.87	Q
10	Cassandre Beaugrand	France	4:18.56	q
11	Katelyn Ayers	Canada	4:18.87	q PB
12	Anna Laman	Australia	4:18.89	q
13	Ekaterina Sokolova	Russia	4:19.88	
14	Anastasía-Panayióta Marinákou	Greece	4:20.50	
15	Marege Hayelom	Azerbaijan	4:20.58	
16	Maria Larsen	Denmark	4:21.68	
17	Sara Souhi	Morocco	4:23.17	PB
18	Josephine Thestrup	Denmark	4:23.60	
19	Maria Claudia Florea	Romania	4:25.12	PB
20	Rima Chenah	Algeria	4:25.97	PB
21	Elisabeth Angell Bergh	Norway	4:26.14	
22	Emine Hatun Tuna	Turkey	4:26.28	
23	Arantza Hernández	Mexico	4:29.06	
24	Giulia Aprile	Italy	4:29.43	
25	Mokulube Makatisi	Lesotho	4:32.43	
26	Síofra Cléirigh Büttner	Ireland	4:33.49	
27	Johanna Geyer Carles	France	4:33.84	
28	Alexandra Lucki	Canada	4:36.90	
29	Enlitha Ncube	Zimbabwe	4:40.06	PB

==== Details ====
First 4 in each heat (Q) and the next 4 fastest (q) advance to the Final

===== Heat 1 =====
27 July
Start time: 12:14 Temperature: 22 °C Humidity: 50%

Rank	Name	Nationality	Time	Notes
1	Gudaf Tsegay	Ethiopia	4:15.62	Q
2	Sheila Chepngetich Keter	Kenya	4:16.13	Q
3	Bobby Clay	United Kingdom	4:16.56	Q SB
4	Alexa Efraimson	United States	4:16.87	Q
5	Ekaterina Sokolova	Russia	4:19.88	
6	Anastasía-Panayióta Marinákou	Greece	4:20.50	
7	Maria Larsen	Denmark	4:21.68	
8	Sara Souhi	Morocco	4:23.17	PB
9	Rima Chenah	Algeria	4:25.97	PB
10	Emine Hatun Tuna	Turkey	4:26.28	
11	Arantza Hernández	Mexico	4:29.06	
12	Giulia Aprile	Italy	4:29.43	
13	Johanna Geyer Carles	France	4:33.84	
14	Alexandra Lucki	Canada	4:36.90	

Intermediate times:
400m: 1:09.60 Ekaterina Sokolova
800m: 2:20.89 Alexa Efraimson
1200m: 3:28.35 Sheila Chepngetich Keter

===== Heat 2 =====
27 July
Start time: 12:24 Temperature: 22 °C Humidity: 50%

Rank	Name	Nationality	Time	Notes
1	Dawit Seyaum	Ethiopia	4:14.72	Q
2	Sofia Ennaoui	Poland	4:15.07	Q
3	Winfred Mbithe	Kenya	4:15.12	Q PB
4	Elise Cranny	United States	4:15.21	Q
5	Amy Griffiths	United Kingdom	4:16.22	q
6	Cassandre Beaugrand	France	4:18.56	q
7	Katelyn Ayers	Canada	4:18.87	q PB
8	Anna Laman	Australia	4:18.89	q
9	Marege Hayelom	Azerbaijan	4:20.58	
10	Josephine Thestrup	Denmark	4:23.60	
11	Maria Claudia Florea	Romania	4:25.12	PB
12	Elisabeth Angell Bergh	Norway	4:26.14	
13	Mokulube Makatisi	Lesotho	4:32.43	
14	Síofra Cléirigh Büttner	Ireland	4:33.49	
15	Enlitha Ncube	Zimbabwe	4:40.06	PB

Intermediate times:
400m: 1:05.01 Dawit Seyaum
800m: 2:16.58 Dawit Seyaum
1200m: 3:25.57 Dawit Seyaum

== Participation ==
According to an unofficial count, 29 athletes from 22 countries participated in the event.

- Algeria (1)
- Australia (1)
- Azerbaijan (1)
- Canada (2)
- Denmark (2)
- Ethiopia (2)
- France (2)
- Greece (1)
- Ireland (1)
- Italy (1)
- Kenya (2)
- Lesotho (1)
- Mexico (1)
- Morocco (1)
- Norway (1)
- Poland (1)
- Romania (1)
- Russia (1)
- Turkey (1)
- United Kingdom (2)
- United States (2)
- Zimbabwe (1)
