= Millicent Fawcett Mile =

Race in London, United Kingdom

- Location: Various locations in the United Kingdom
- Event type: Track
- Distance: 1 Mile race
- Established: 2018
- Course records: 4:14.71

The Millicent Fawcett Mile is an annual one mile running race for women, inaugurated in 2018 at the Müller Anniversary Games held in London in July 2018.

The inaugural race was won by Sifan Hassan (Netherlands) in 4:14.71. There had been a women's mile event at previous games, without this title, the previous record being held by Hellen Obiri (Kenya) who ran in 2017 in 4:16.56 and came third in 2018 in 4:16.15.

The race name commemorates suffragist Millicent Fawcett, to commemorate the centenary of women's suffrage in the UK. As the foremost women's mile track race in Great Britain, it intentionally mirrors the older men's equivalent, the Emsley Carr Mile. for example, the winner of each race will sign a commemorative book, as has been the practice since 1953 for the Emsley Carr Mile held at the same meeting.

== Winners ==
Year	Winner	Time	Venue
2018	Sifan Hassan (NED)	4:14:71	London Stadium, London
2019	Konstanze Klosterhalfen (GER)	4:21:11	Birmingham
2021	Kate Grace (USA)	4:27:20	Gateshead International Stadium, Gateshead
2022	Georgia Griffith (AUS)	4:27:81	Parliament Hill
2023	N/A	N/A	Sportcity, Manchester
2025	Tsige Teshome (ETH)	4:26:79	Stirling
2026	Laura Muir (GBR)	4:34:06	Oxford
