= 2025 World Athletics Indoor Championships – Women's 1500 metres =

Women's 1500 metres at the 2025 World Athletics Indoor Championships
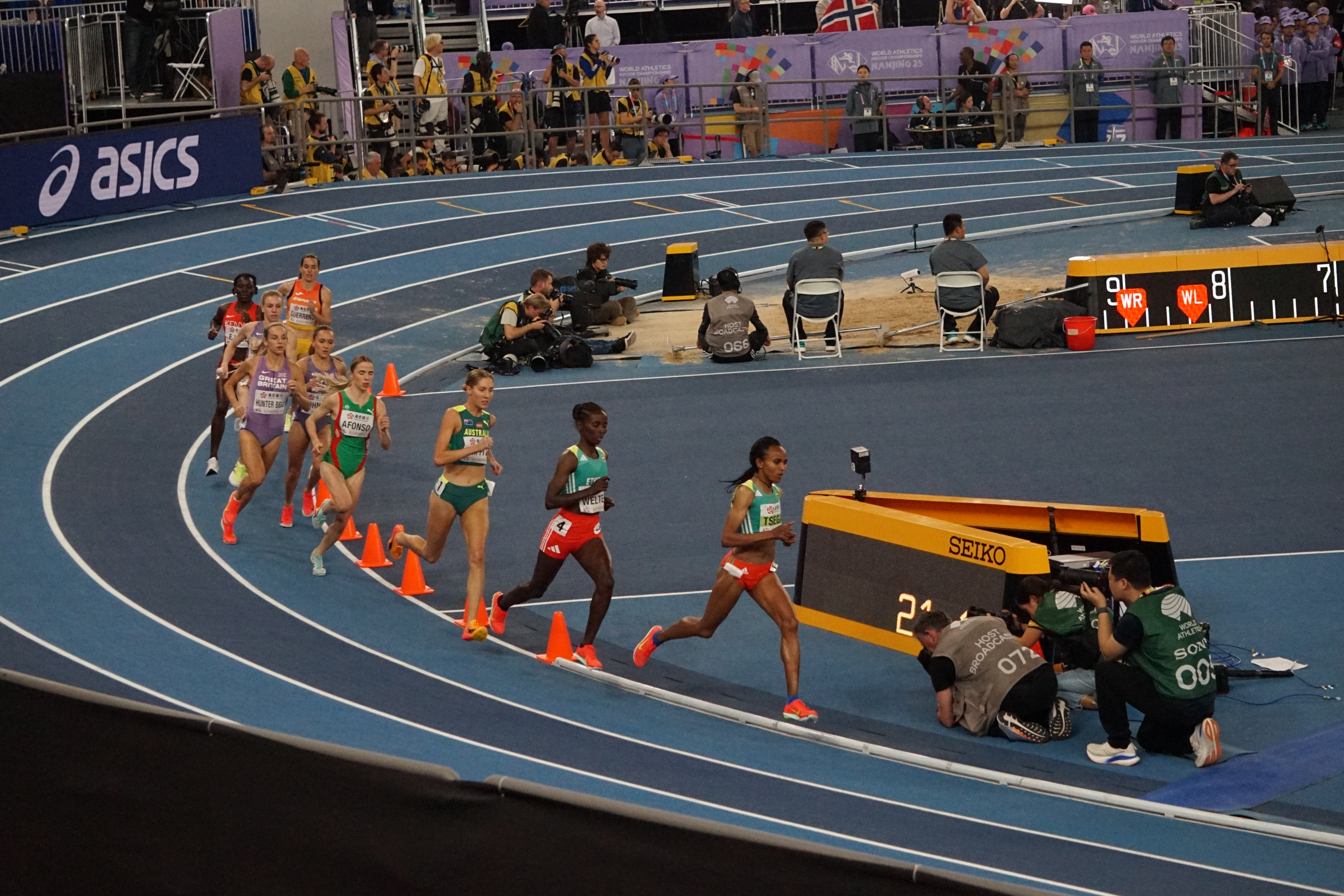
- The final underway
- Venue: Nanjing's Cube at Nanjing Youth Olympic Sports Park
- Location: Nanjing, China
- Dates: 21 March (heats); 23 March (final)
- Winning time: 3:54.86 CR

Medalists
gold medal	Gudaf Tsegay	Ethiopia
silver medal	Vacant
bronze medal	Georgia Hunter Bell	Great Britain

The women's 1500 metres at the 2025 World Athletics Indoor Championships took place on the short track of the Nanjing's Cube at Nanjing Youth Olympic Sports Park in Nanjing, China on 23 March 2025. It was the 21st time the event was contested at the World Athletics Indoor Championships. Athletes qualified by achieving the entry standard or by their World Athletics Ranking in the event.

The heats took place on 21 March during the evening session. The final took place on 23 March during the evening session.

== Background ==
The women's 1500 metres was contested 20 times before 2025, at every previous edition of the World Athletics Indoor Championships.

Records before the 2025 World Athletics Indoor Championships
Record	Athlete (nation)	Time (s)	Location	Date
World record	Gudaf Tsegay (ETH)	3:53.09	Liévin, France	9 February 2021
Championship record	Gudaf Tsegay (ETH)	3:57.19	Belgrade, Serbia	19 March 2022
World leading	Gudaf Tsegay (ETH)	3:53.92	Toruń, Poland	8 February 2025

== Qualification ==
For the women's 1500 metres, the qualification period ran from 1 September 2024 until 9 March 2025. Athletes qualified by achieving the entry standards of 4:03.00 or 4:22.50 in the mile. Athletes were also able to qualify by virtue of their World Athletics Ranking for the event or by virtue of their World Athletics Indoor Tour wildcard. There was a target number of 30 athletes.

== Results ==
=== Heats ===
The heats took place on 21 March, starting at 18:33 (UTC+8). The first 3 of each heat (Q) qualified for the final.

==== Heat 1 ====
Place	Athlete	Nation	Time	Notes
1	Gudaf Tsegay	Ethiopia	4:11.87	Q
2	Sinclaire Johnson	United States	4:12.18	Q
3	Susan Ejore	Kenya	4:12.41	Q
4	Simone Plourde	Canada	4:13.97	
5	Sintayehu Vissa	Italy	4:14.25	
6	Joceline Wind	Switzerland	4:17.81	
7	Anita Poma	Peru	4:21.77	NR
8	July da Silva Fereira	Brazil	4:22.24	PB

==== Heat 2 ====
Place	Athlete	Nation	Time	Notes
1	Georgia Bell	Great Britain	4:09.21	Q
2	Georgia Griffith	Australia	4:09.78	Q, PB
3	Esther Guerrero	Spain	4:09.90	Q
4	Worknesh Mesele	Ethiopia	4:10.61	
5	Gabija Galvydytė	Lithuania	4:11.69	
6	Maia Ramsden	New Zealand	4:14.89	
7	Vera Sjöberg	Sweden	4:17.35	
8	María Pía Fernández	Uruguay	4:21.39	SB

==== Heat 3 ====
Place	Athlete	Nation	Time	Notes
1	Diribe Welteji	Ethiopia	4:12.25	Q
2	Heather MacLean	United States	4:13.26	Q
3	Salomé Afonso	Portugal	4:13.39	Q
4	Lucia Stafford	Canada	4:13.45	
5	Revée Walcott-Nolan	Great Britain	4:15.76	
6	Sophie O'Sullivan	Ireland	4:16.68	PB
7	Claire Uwitonze	Rwanda	4:17.33	NR
8	Laura Nagel	New Zealand	4:18.61	PB
9	Xu Hui	China	4:33.65	

=== Final ===
The final took place on 23 March, starting at 20:28 (UTC+8).

Place	Athlete	Nation	Time	Notes
1st place, gold medalist(s)	Gudaf Tsegay	Ethiopia	3:54.86	CR
3rd place, bronze medalist(s)	Georgia Bell	Great Britain	3:59.84	PB
4	Georgia Griffith	Australia	4:00.80	AR
5	Susan Ejore	Kenya	4:03.89	
6	Sinclaire Johnson	United States	4:04.07	PB
7	Heather MacLean	United States	4:05.45	
8	Salomé Afonso	Portugal	4:07.67	
9	Esther Guerrero	Spain	4:07.76	
DSQ	Diribe Welteji	Ethiopia	~~3:59.30~~	DQ (Anti-doping violations)
