= 2014 African Championships in Athletics – Women's 1500 metres =

The women's 1500 metres event at the 2014 African Championships in Athletics was held on August 12 on Stade de Marrakech.

== Results ==
Rank	Name	Nationality	Time	Notes
1st place, gold medalist(s)	Hellen Obiri	Kenya	4:09.53	
2nd place, silver medalist(s)	Dawit Seyaum	Ethiopia	4:10.92	
3rd place, bronze medalist(s)	Rababe Arafi	Morocco	4:12.08	
4	Axumawit Embaye	Ethiopia	4:13.27	
5	Faith Chepngetich Kipyegon	Kenya	4:13.46	
6	Habiba Ghribi	Tunisia	4:14.51	
7	Besu Sado	Ethiopia	4:17.51	
8	Selah Jepleting Busienei	Kenya	4:19.24	
9	Sanae Elothmani	Morocco	4:21.61	
10	Merhawit Ghide	Eritrea	4:30.03	
11	Felismina Cavela	Angola	4:41.10	
12	Bafoundissa Missamou	Republic of the Congo	4:57.50	
	Liliane Nguetsa	Cameroon	DNF	
	Seltana Aït Hammou	Morocco	DNF	
	Oumou Diarra	Mali	DNS	
