= 2016 IAAF World Indoor Championships – Women's 1500 metres =

Women's 1500 metres at the 2016 IAAF World Indoor Championships
- Venue: Oregon Convention Center
- Dates: March 18 (heats); March 19 (final)
- Competitors: 20 from 15 nations
- Winning time: 4:04.96

Medalists
gold medal	Sifan Hassan	Netherlands
silver medal	Dawit Seyaum	Ethiopia
bronze medal	Gudaf Tsegay	Ethiopia

Video on YouTube Official Video

The women's 1500 metres at the 2016 IAAF World Indoor Championships took place on March 18 and 19, 2016.

Ethiopia managed to put three athletes into this final, but the early leader was Melissa Duncan who broke away for the first three laps. The peloton was not concerned until just before the 1 km mark, when Sifan Hassan made a move forward. That move was taken seriously with the Ethiopians, Brenda Martinez and Violah Lagat all scrambling to line up behind her. But after assuming the lead, Hassan didn't try to accelerate, instead slowing the pace while the pack jostled for position behind her, with the tiring Duncan in the middle as yet another obstacle. With two laps to go, Hassan accelerated again, this time breaking away from the pack. At the bell only Dawit Seyaum and Gudaf Tsegay were able to stay with her. Along the back stretch and through the final turn, Seyaum pulled onto Hassan's outside shoulder with the obvious intent to pass her coming off the turn. Instead, Hassan just accelerated away from Seyaum to take the gold.

== Results ==
=== Heats ===
Qualification: First 3 (Q) and next 3 fastest (q) qualified for the final.

Rank	Heat	Name	Nationality	Time	Notes
1	2	Sifan Hassan	Netherlands	4:07.28	Q
2	2	Gudaf Tsegay	Ethiopia	4:07.98	Q
3	1	Dawit Seyaum	Ethiopia	4:09.05	Q
4	2	Danuta Urbanik	Poland	4:09.41	Q, SB
5	1	Axumawit Embaye	Ethiopia	4:09.43	Q
6	1	Brenda Martinez	United States	4:09.75	Q
7	2	Melissa Duncan	Australia	4:10.40	q
8	1	Renata Pliś	Poland	4:10.44	q
9	1	Violah Cheptoo Lagat	Kenya	4:10.77	q, SB
10	1	Rababe Arafi	Morocco	4:10.82	
11	1	Kristiina Mäki	Czech Republic	4:11.28	PB
12	2	Gabriela Stafford	Canada	4:11.46	SB
13	2	Cory McGee	United States	4:11.62	
14	1	Sarah Lahti	Sweden	4:11.68	PB
15	2	Claudia Bobocea	Romania	4:12.38	
16	2	Luiza Gega	Albania	4:16.12	
17	1	Rose-Anne Galligan	Ireland	4:16.84	
18	1	Nicole Sifuentes	Canada	4:17.24	SB
19	2	Beatha Nishimwe	Rwanda	4:19.39	NR
20	2	Tamara Armoush	Jordan	4:37.61	NR

== Final ==
The final was started on March 19 at 19:18.

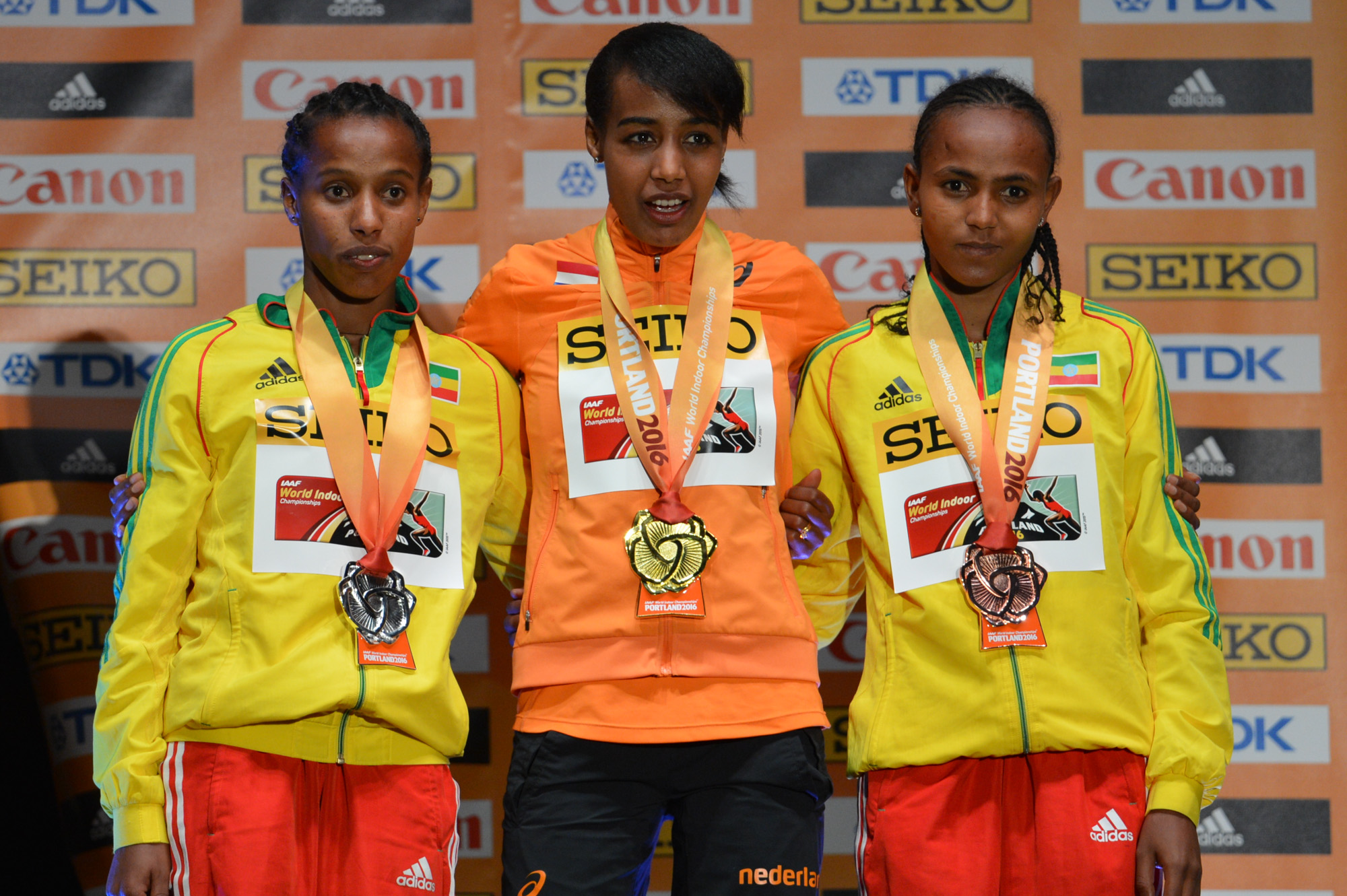
The medalists (left to right): Dawit Seyaum, Sifan Hassan and Gudaf Tsegay

Rank	Name	Nationality	Time	Notes
1st place, gold medalist(s)	Sifan Hassan	Netherlands	4:04.96	
2nd place, silver medalist(s)	Dawit Seyaum	Ethiopia	4:05.30	
3rd place, bronze medalist(s)	Gudaf Tsegay	Ethiopia	4:05.71	
4	Axumawit Embaye	Ethiopia	4:09.37	
5	Brenda Martinez	United States	4:09.57	
6	Melissa Duncan	Australia	4:09.69	
7	Renata Pliś	Poland	4:10.14	
8	Violah Cheptoo Lagat	Kenya	4:10.45	SB
9	Danuta Urbanik	Poland	4:12.59	
