= 2014 IAAF World Relays – Women's 4 × 1500 metres relay =

Women's 4 × 1500 metres relay at the 2014 IAAF World Relays
- Venue: Thomas Robinson Stadium
- Dates: 24 May (final)

The women's 4 × 1500 metres relay at the 2014 IAAF World Relays was held at the Thomas Robinson Stadium on 24 May.

== Records ==
Prior to the competition, the records were as follows:

World record	Kenya	17:08.17	Nairobi, Kenya	4 April 2014
Championship record	New event			
World Leading	Kenya	17:08.17	Nairobi, Kenya	4 April 2014
African Record	Kenya	17:08.17	Nairobi, Kenya	4 April 2014
Asian Record	New record			
North, Central American and Caribbean record	(United States) University of Tennessee (Chanelle Price, Phoebe Wright, Rolanda Bell, Sarah Brown)	17:08.34	Philadelphia, United States	24 April 2009
South American Record	New record			
European Record	New record			
Oceanian record	New record			

== Schedule ==
Date	Time	Round
24 May 2014	19:45	Final

All times are local times (UTC-4)

== Results ==
KEY:	q	Fastest non-qualifiers	Q	Qualified	NR	National record	PB	Personal best	SB	Seasonal best

=== Final ===
Rank	Nation	Athletes	Time	Notes	Points
1st place, gold medalist(s)	Kenya	Mercy Cherono, Faith Chepngetich Kipyegon, Irene Jelagat, Hellen Onsando Obiri	16:33.58	WR	8
2nd place, silver medalist(s)	United States	Heather Kampf, Katie Mackey, Kate Grace, Brenda Martinez	16:55.33	AR	7
3rd place, bronze medalist(s)	Australia	Zoe Buckman, Bridey Delaney, Brittany McGowan, Melissa Duncan	17:08.65	AR	6
4	Romania	Claudia Bobocea, Florina Pierdevară, Anca Maria Bunea, Lenuţa Simiuc	17:51.48	NR	5
