= Gudaf Tsegay =

Ethiopian middle- and long-distance runner (born 1997)

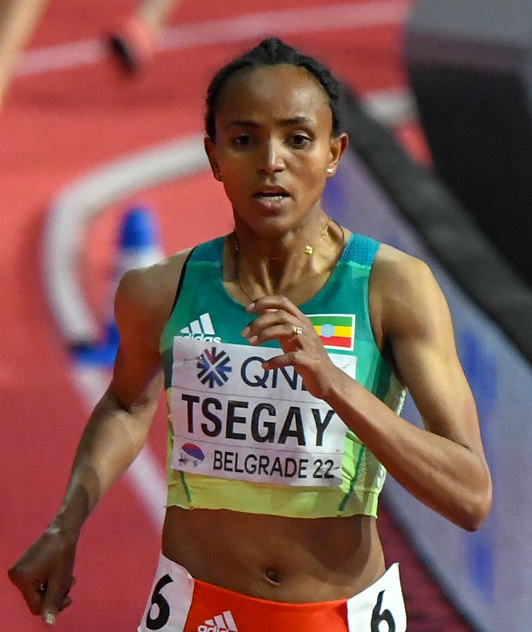
- Gudaf at the 2022 World Indoor Championships in Belgrade

Personal information
- Full name: Gudaf Tsegay Desta
- Nationality: Ethiopian
- Born: 23 January 1997 (age 29) Bora, Tigray Region, Ethiopia
- Height: 1.63 m (5 ft 4 in)
- Weight: 50 kg (110 lb)
- Spouse: Hiluf Yihdego

Sport
- Country: Ethiopia
- Sport: Athletics
- Events: Middle-, Long-distance running
- Coached by: Hiluf Yihdego

Achievements and titles
- Highest world ranking: 1st (5,000m, 2023)
- Personal bests: 1500 m: 3:50.30 (Xiamen 2024); 5000 m: 14:00.21 NR (Eugene 2023); 10,000 m: 29:05.92 (Eugene 2024); Indoors; 800 m: 1:57.52i NR (Val-de-Reuil 2021); 1500 m: 3:53.09i WR (Liévin 2021); 3000 m: 8:16.69i (Birmingham 2023)
Medal record
Women's athletics
Representing Ethiopia
Olympic Games
Bronze medal – third place	2020 Tokyo	5000 m
World Championships
Gold medal – first place	2022 Eugene	5000 m
Gold medal – first place	2023 Budapest	10,000 m
Silver medal – second place	2022 Eugene	1500 m
Bronze medal – third place	2019 Doha	1500 m
Bronze medal – third place	2025 Tokyo	10,000 m
World Indoor Championships
Gold medal – first place	2025 Nanjing	1500 m
Gold medal – first place	2022 Belgrade	1500 m
Silver medal – second place	2024 Glasgow	3000 m
Bronze medal – third place	2016 Portland	1500 m
Diamond League
First place	2023	5000 m
World Junior Championships
Silver medal – second place	2014 Eugene	1500 m

Gudaf Tsegay Desta (Tigrinya: ጉዳፉ ፀጋይ ደስታ; born 23 January 1997) is an Ethiopian middle- and long-distance runner. She is the world indoor record holder for the 1500 metres, and formerly held the 5000 metre world record.

Gudaf is the 2022 World Champion in the 5000 metres and the 2023 World Champion in the 10,000 metres. She is the bronze medalist in the 2019 World Championship 1500 metres, the silver medalist in the 2022 World Championships, and the 2020 Tokyo Olympic bronze medallist in the 5000 metres. She is a two-time World Indoor Championship 1500 m medallist, claiming bronze in 2016 and gold in 2022.

At age 16, Gudaf represented Ethiopia in the 1500 m at the 2014 World Indoor Championships. That same year, the 17-year-old won the silver medal in the discipline at the World U20 Championships. She is a versatile runner.

== Personal life ==
Gudaf Tsegay comes from the Tigray Region in northern Ethiopia. She is married to Hiluf Yihdego, who is also her coach.

== Career ==
In February 2014, 16-year-old Gudaf set the world's fastest under-18 mark in the indoor 1,500 metres with a time of 4:08.47 in Stockholm. In July, she became the World U20 Championship silver medallist in Eugene, Oregon, clocking 4:10.83 behind her compatriot Dawit Seyaum in 4:09.86.

Two years later, Gudaf broke the world U20 indoor record in this event with a time of 4:01.81 in Glasgow, beating previous best set by compatriot Kalkidan Gezahegne in 2010 by more than a second. Gudaf's record was bettered in 2020 by her another compatriot Lemlem Hailu. At the World Indoor Championships held in Portland, Oregon, she won the bronze medal in 4:05.71 behind only Sifan Hassan representing the Netherlands (4:04.96) and Dawit (4:05.30). The then 19-year-old represented Ethiopia in the 800 metres at the 2016 Rio Olympics, where she was eliminated in her heat, clocking 2:00.13.

In 2017, she ran her first sub-4 minute 1500 m in finishing third at the Paris Diamond League on 1 July. Gudaf competed at the London World Championships and went out of the 1,500 m event in the semi-finals. She fell after the first lap and was unable to recover, finishing about 13 seconds slower than the time she had run in the heats.

Gudaf ran her first 5000 m on 26 May 2018, at the Prefontaine Classic finishing fourth in 14:51.30. She followed it up by recording her first Diamond League win at the BAUHAUS-galan in Stockholm, setting a big new personal best of 3:57.41 for the 1500 m. On 22 July, Gudaf set another new personal best of 4:16.14 for the mile at the London Diamond League.

At the following World Championships in 2019 in Doha, Qatar, Gudaf won the bronze medal in the event with a personal best time of 3:54.38. Hassan was first in 3:51.95 while Kenya's Faith Kipyegon finished second in 3:54.22.

The next year, she earned her first overall 1500 m World Indoor Tour victory, winning races at the Copernicus Cup in Toruń, Poland, Meeting Hauts-de-France Pas-de-Calais in Liévin, France and Villa de Madrid in Spain.

=== 2021: World indoor 1500 m record ===
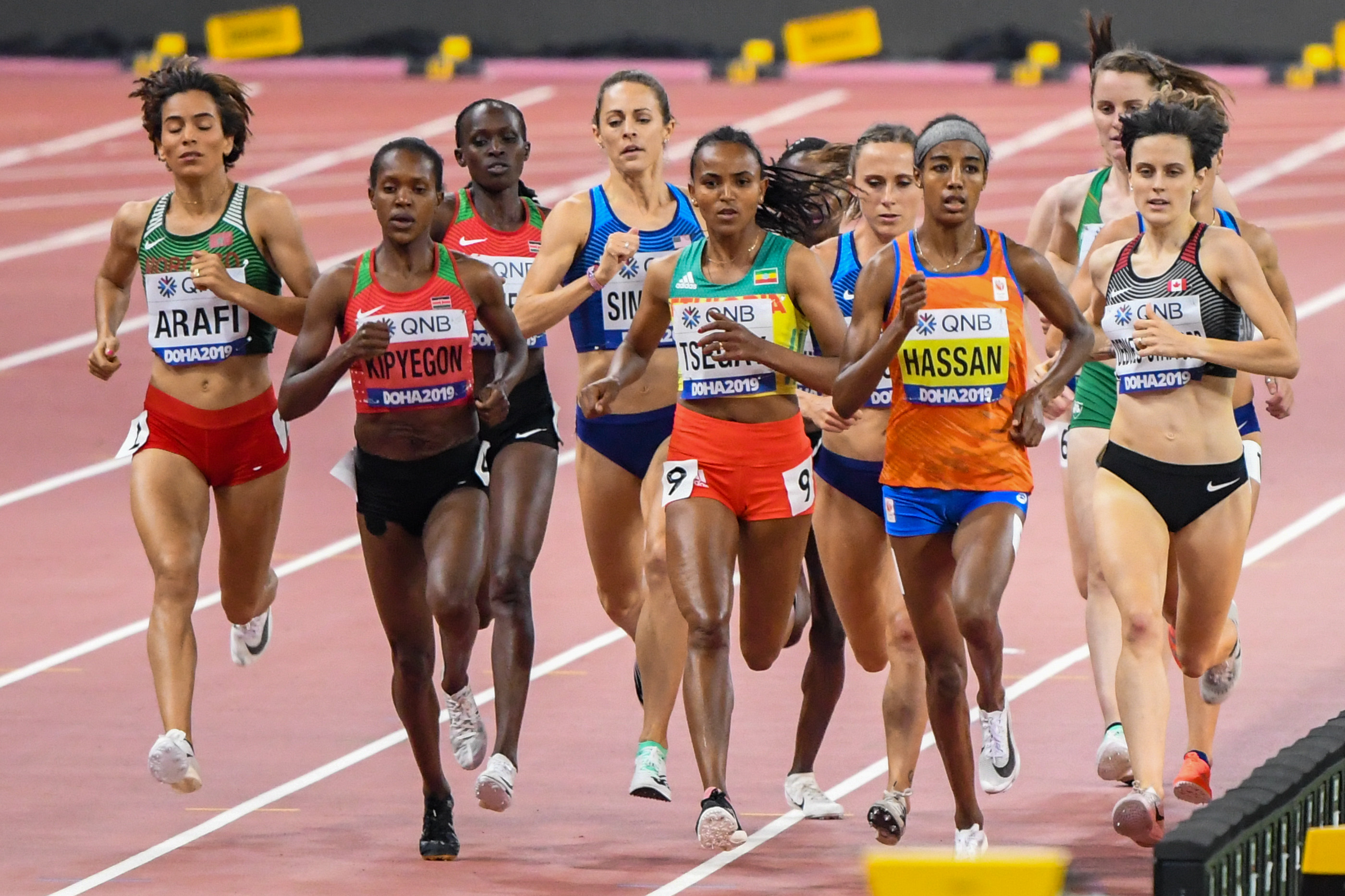
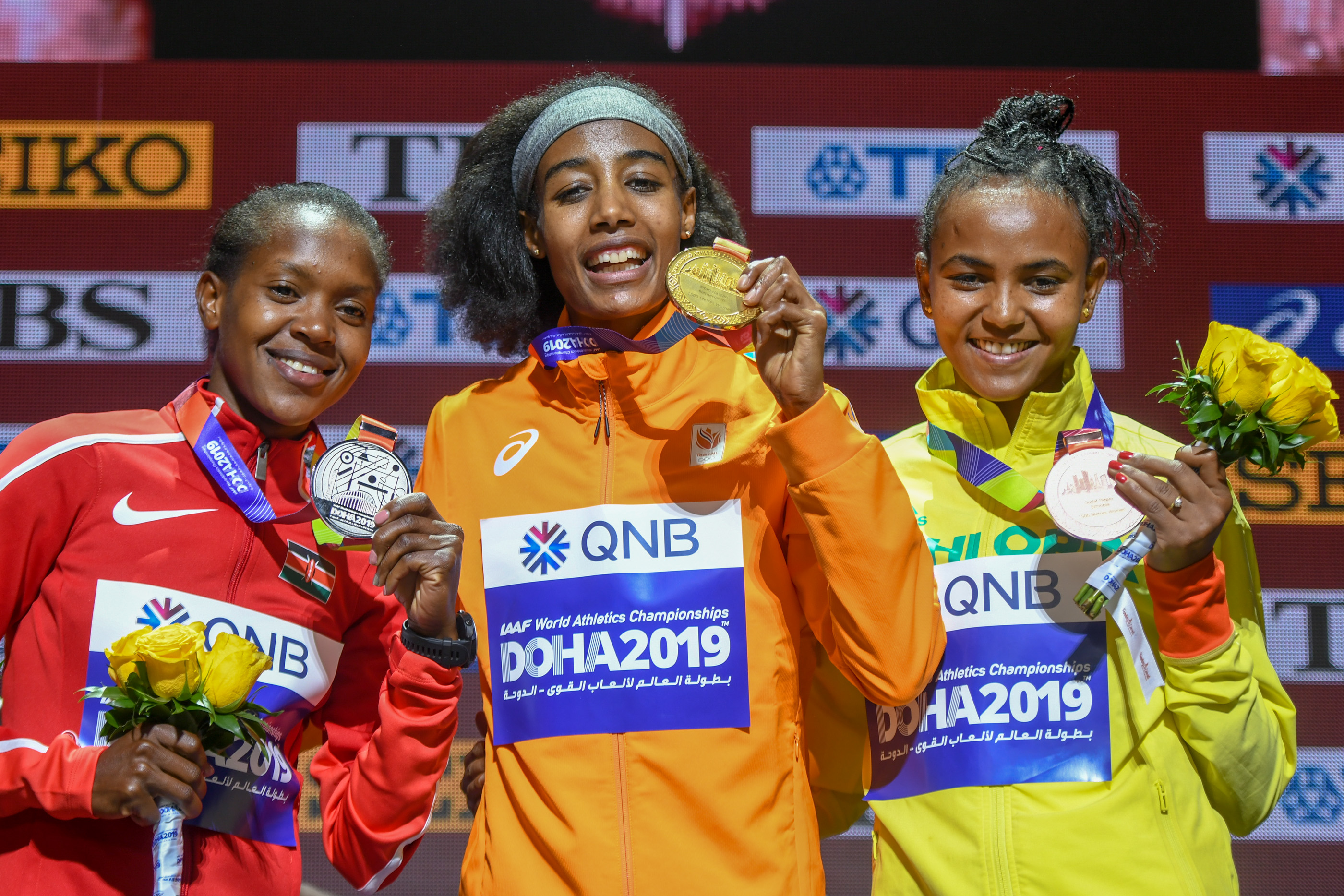
In the 1500 m final at the 2019 Doha World Championships, Gudaf (R in yellow) finished behind only Sifan Hassan (C) and Faith Kipyegon (L).

On 9 February, Gudaf broke the world indoor 1500 m record at the Meeting Hauts-de-France Pas-de-Calais. The former mark of 3:55.17 set by her compatriot Genzebe Dibaba in 2014 was lowered by Gudaf to 3:53.09. Five days later, she set a new 800 m personal best of 1:57.52 at the Meeting de l'Eure in Val-de-Reuil, moving her up to ninth on the all-time lists at the time.

Gudaf clocked the fastest 10,000 m debut in history as she won at the Gold Gala Fernanda Ribeiro in Maia in 29:39.42. In June, Gudaf won the 5000 m at the Ethiopian Trials in Hengelo with a new personal best of 14:13.32. The mark was the world best for 2021. She won bronze over 5000 m at the delayed 2020 Tokyo Olympics. Sifan Hassan came first in 14:36.79 while Kenya's Hellen Obiri was second clocking 14:38.36.

=== 2022: World indoor 1500 m champion, and world outdoor 5,000 m champion & 1,500 m silver medallist ===
In February, Gudaf contested the mile in Liévin. After falling on the first lap, she finished in 4:21.72, missing Dibaba's world record of 4:13.31 but breaking the 20-year-old meeting record. A few days later, chasing her own world indoor record over 1,500 m at the Copernicus Cup in Poland, she was only 1.68 seconds behind, securing the second-fastest mark on the world indoor all-time list. She comfortably took her second overall World Indoor Tour 1,500 m victory eight days later at the Villa de Madrid Indoor Meeting, producing another record-breaking 3:57.38, the fifth-fastest result in turn on the world all-time indoor ranking.

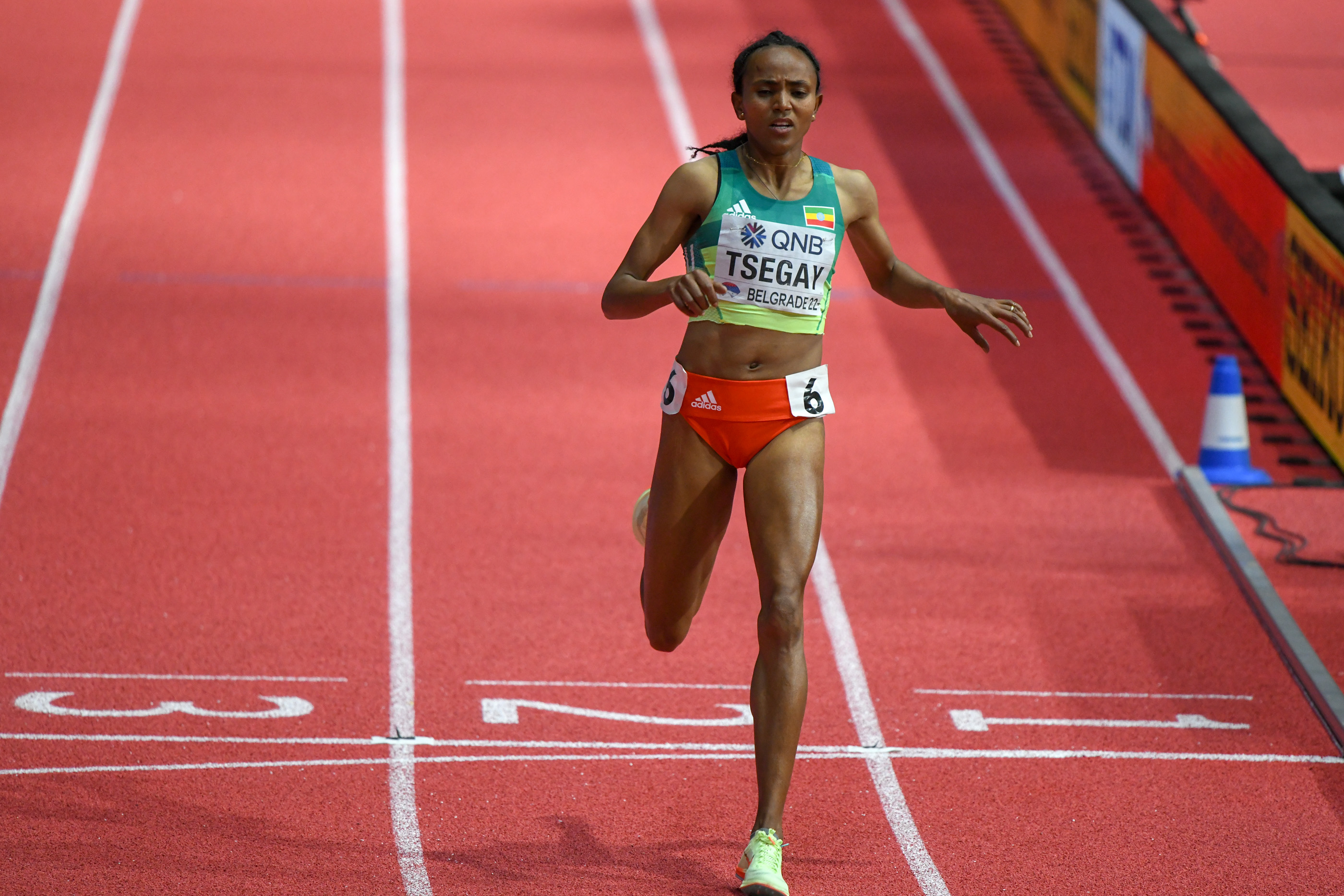
Gudaf took her first global title, dominating in the 1500 m at the 2022 World Indoor Championships in Belgrade.

Also in March, Gudaf continued her record-breaking form, dominating in her specialist event at the World Indoor Championships held in Belgrade, Serbia. She took her first global title, setting a championship record of 3:57.19 and winning by more than five seconds (~30 m). She led an Ethiopian medals sweep as Axumawit Embaye and Hirut Meshesha finished second and third, respectively. It was the first time one country swept the medals in any discipline, and the seventh successive Ethiopian women's victory in the event, at the World Athletics Indoor Championships.

Her best success of that year came in July at the World Championships in Eugene, Oregon, where she won two medals including her first global outdoor title. First the 25-year-old took silver in the 1,500 m event, finishing behind only Faith Kipyegon and ahead of Laura Muir. Five days later, she claimed the gold medal for the closely-run 5,000 m race with a time of 14:46.29, ahead of Beatrice Chebet in 14:46.75 and compatriot Dawit Seyaum (14:47.36).

Gudaf doubled up at the Diamond League final in Zürich in September, placing third in the 5 kilometres road race and sixth in the 1,500 m event.

=== 2023: World 10,000 m champion and 5,000 m world record ===
She got her 2023 campaign off to strong start in February, running the indoor mile in Toruń, Poland. Gudaf missed the world record but her time of 4:16.16 was the second-fastest ever at the time. The same month, she came within just 0.09 seconds of Dibaba's world indoor 3000 m record, clocking a super fast 8:16.69 at the World Indoor Tour final in Birmingham.

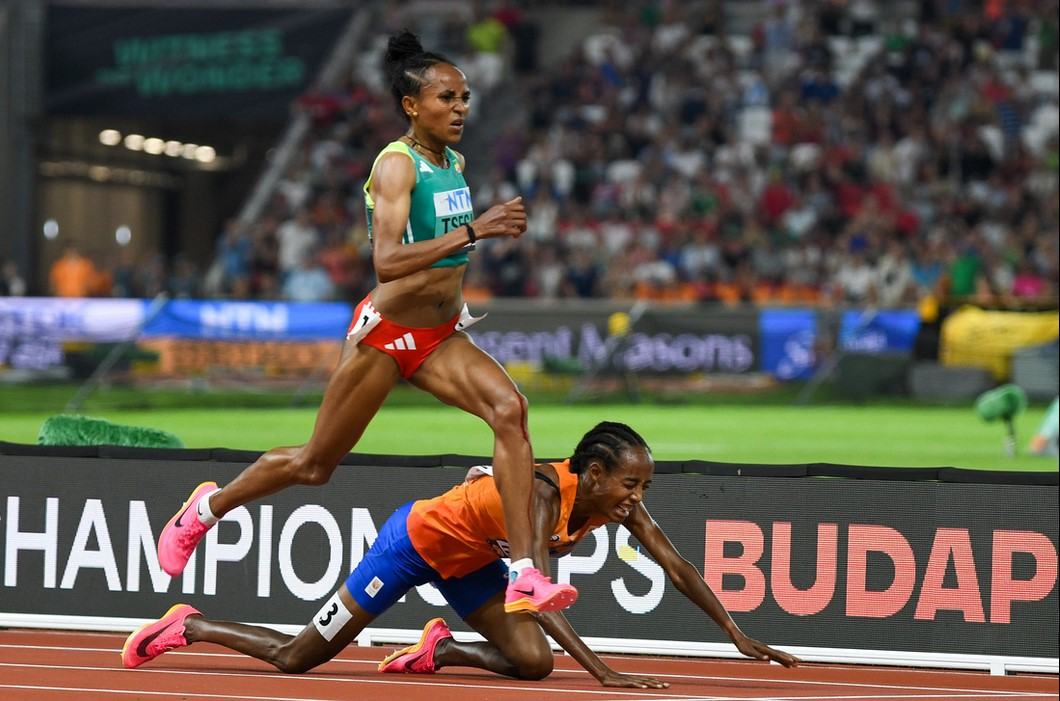
Gudaf on her way to winning gold in the 10,000 m at the 2023 World Championships as Sifan Hassan falls.

She enjoyed a strong start to her outdoor season by winning the 1500 m at the Rabat Diamond League in a meeting record of 3:54.03. Later that year, in July, Gudaf competed at the London Diamond League where she outsprinted a strong field including Sifan Hassan, Beatrice Chebet and Medina Eisa to win, setting a new 5000 m personal best of 14:12.29.

At the 2023 World Championships, in Budapest, Gudaf won gold in the 10,000 m after a frantic finish where Sifan Hassan fell after making contact with Gudaf in the final 100 m. She also competed over 5000 m, placing 13th in the final. At the final Diamond League Final in Eugene, Oregon, Gudaf set a new world record over 5000 m of 14:00.21, bettering Faith Kipyegon's mark of 14:05.20 set earlier in the year.

=== 2024: World indoor silver medal and 2024 Olympics ===
Gudaf opened her 2024 season on 4 February at the New Balance Indoor Grand Prix, winning the 1500 m in a meeting record of 3:58.11. At the World Indoor Championships held in Glasgow, Gudaf won silver in the 3000 m, being outrun by Elle St. Pierre over the last 50 m. She competed in her first outdoor race of the season on 20 April at the Xiamen Diamond League, where she ran the a new personal best of 3:50.30 over 1500 m which put her third on the all-time top lists. On 25 May, at the Prefontaine Classic, Gudaf made an attempt to break the 10,000 metres world record of 29:01.03 set by Letesenbet Gidey of Ethiopia in 2021. However, Gudaf was closely followed by Kenyan athlete Beatrice Chebet, who made a surge with three laps to go while Gudaf fell behind. Chebet ended up finishing in a new world record time of 28:54.14, while Gudaf still finished in a personal best time of 29:05.92.

On 5 August, at the 2024 Paris Olympics, Gudaf attempted the triple of the 1500 m, 5000 m and 10,000 m. Firstly, she finished ninth in the 5000 metres, running 14:45.21. The race was a highly anticipated match-up between Gudaf, Beatrice Chebet, Faith Kipyegon, and Sifan Hassan. The race was won by Chebet in a time of 14:28.56, while Kipyegon finished second in a time of 14:29.60 and Hassan in third at 14:30.61. Nearing the end of the race, Gudaf pushed Kipyegon, which led to a temporarily disqualification for the latter, but this ended up being rescinded and Kipyegon's silver medal was re-instated. Next, Gudaf placed sixth in the 10,000 m in a time of 30:45.21, having been in the lead pack for the majority of the race, Gudaf faded over the last 100 m with Beatrice Chebet winning gold. Finally, Gudaf finished twelfth in the 1500 m, she led the race until the last lap where she slowed and was overtaken by the rest of the field.

=== 2025 ===
In February, after a defeat in the 3000 metres in Liévin, France, Gudaf set a world lead in the short track 1500 metres, running 3:53.92 at the ORLEAN Copernicus Cup in Toruń, Poland. Gudaf's performance was 0.83 seconds short of her world record. In March, Gudaf contested the 1500 metres at the 2025 World Athletics Indoor Championships in Nanjing, China, setting a new championship record of 3:54.86.

=== 2026 ===
In June 2026, Tsegay was issued with a four-month ban for testing positive for letrozole and failing to get a therapeutic use exemption for its use (which was subsequently issued to her).

== Achievements ==
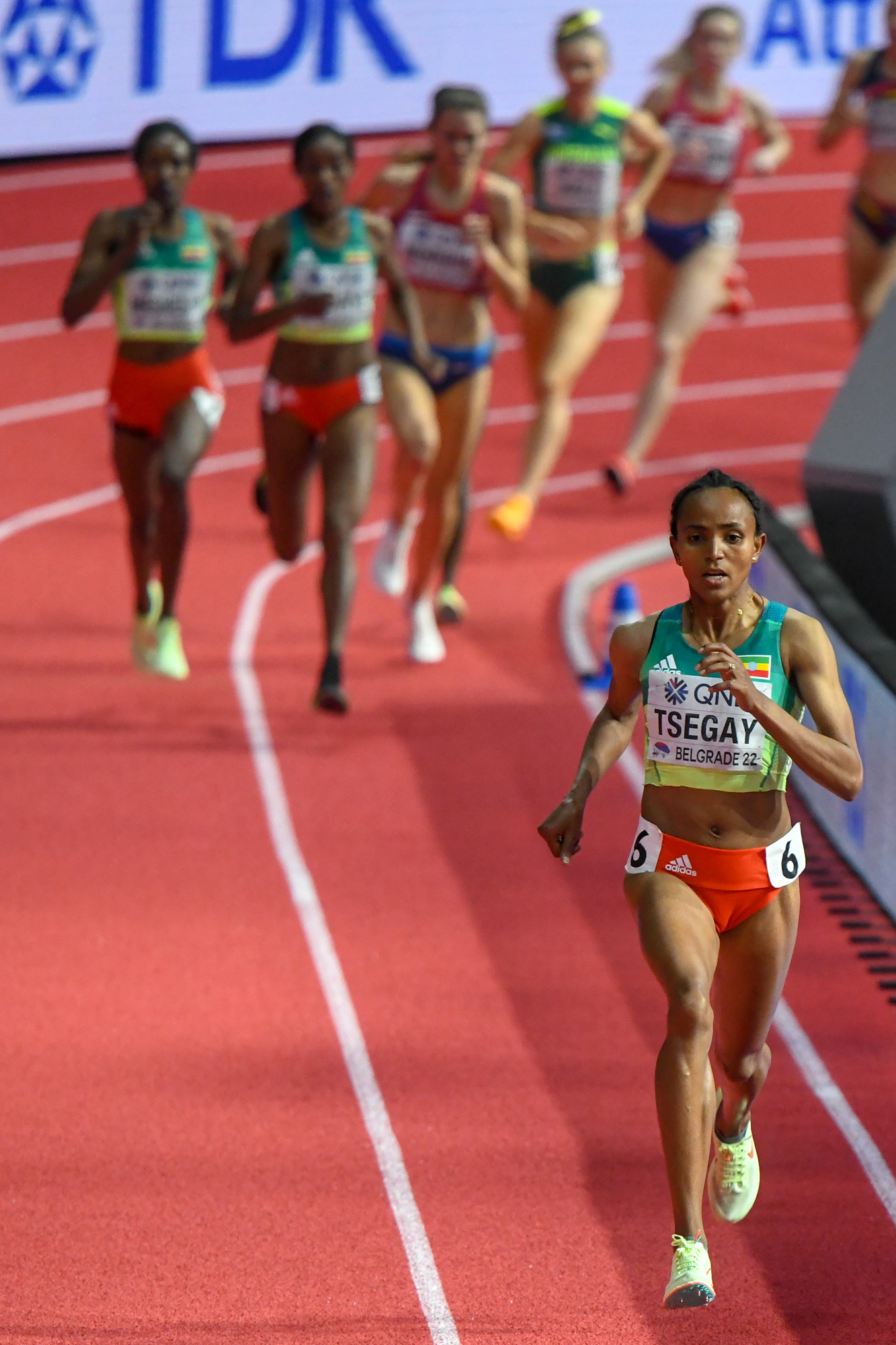
Gudaf (R) ahead of the pack in the 1500 m at the 2022 World Indoor Championships in Belgrade.

=== Personal bests ===
Type	Event	Time (m:s)	Place	Date	Notes
Track	800 metres	1:59.52	Paris, France	24 August 2019	
Track	800 metres indoor	1:57.52 i	Val-de-Reuil, France	14 February 2021	NR, 10th woman of all time
Track	1500 metres	3:50.30	Xiamen, China	20 April 2024	3rd woman of all time
Track	1500 metres indoor	3:53.09 i	Liévin, France	9 February 2021	World record
Track	One mile	4:16.14	London, United Kingdom	22 July 2018	6th woman of all time
Track	One mile indoor	4:16.16 i	Toruń, Poland	8 February 2023	2nd of all time
Track	3000 metres	8:25.23	Doha, Qatar	25 September 2020	
Track	3000 metres indoor	8:16.69 i	Birmingham, United Kingdom	25 February 2023	2nd of all time
Track	5000 metres	14:00.21	Eugene, USA	17 September 2023	2nd of all time
Track	10,000 metres	29:05.92	Eugene, USA	25 May 2024	3rd of all time

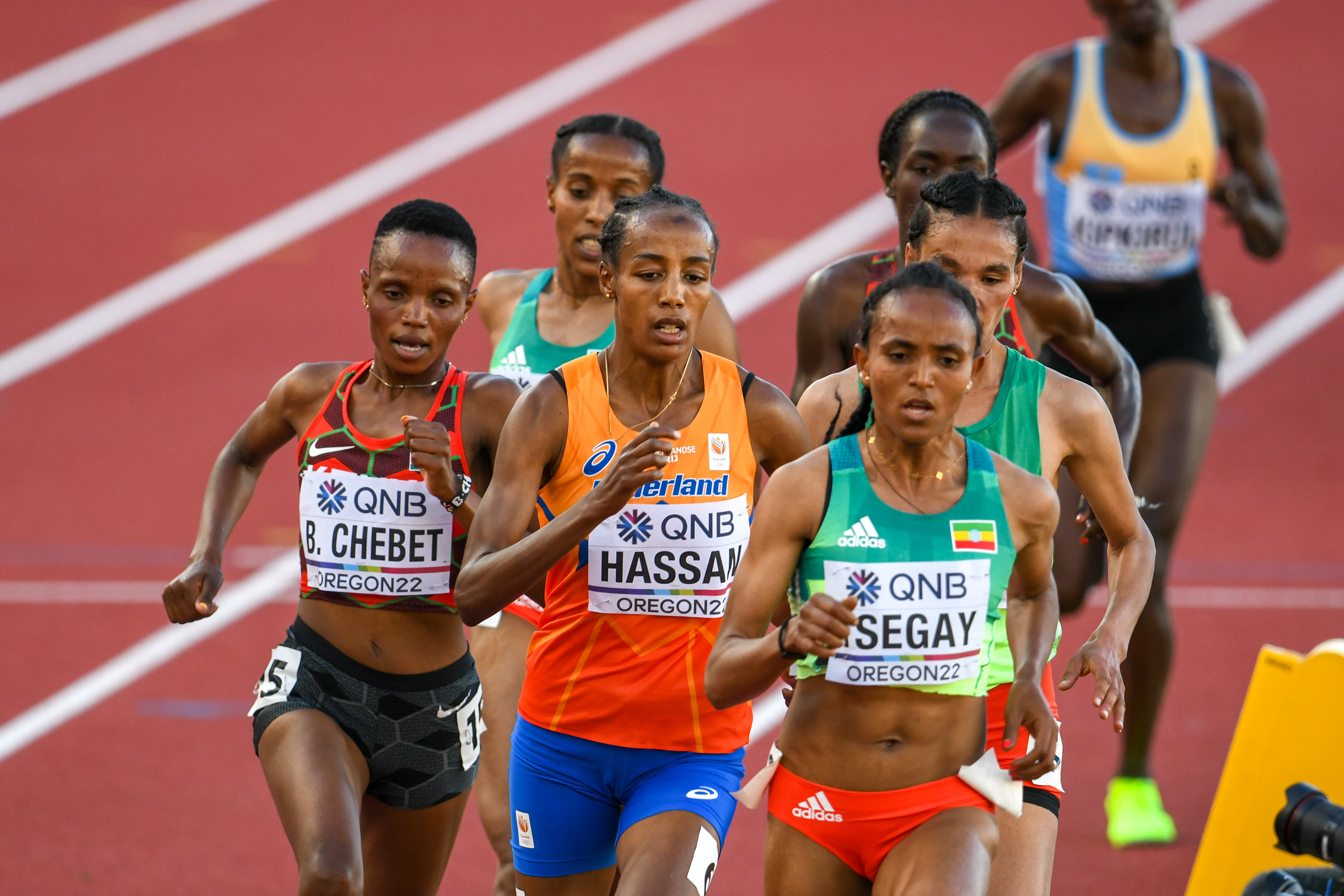
Gudaf Tsegay (R in green) leads the pack en route to the 5000 m victory at the 2022 World Athletics Championships in Eugene.

=== International competitions ===
Representing Ethiopia
Year	Competition	Venue	Position	Event	Time
2014	World Indoor Championships	Sopot, Poland	9th (h)	1500 m i	4:11.83
2014	World Junior Championships	Eugene, OR, United States	2nd	1500 m	4:10.83
2016	World Indoor Championships	Portland, OR, United States	3rd	1500 m i	4:05.71
2016	Olympic Games	Rio de Janeiro, Brazil	19th (h)	800 m	2:00.13
2017	World Championships	London, United Kingdom	24th (sf)	1500 m	4:22.01
2019	World Championships	Doha, Qatar	3rd	1500 m	3:54.38
2021	Olympic Games	Tokyo, Japan	3rd	5000 m	14:38.87
2022	World Indoor Championships	Belgrade, Serbia	1st	1500 m i	3:57.19 CR
2022	World Championships	Eugene, OR, United States	2nd	1500 m	3:54.52
2022	World Championships	Eugene, OR, United States	1st	5000 m	14:46.29
2023	World Championships	Budapest, Hungary	13th	5000 m	15:01.13
2023	World Championships	Budapest, Hungary	1st	10,000 m	31:27.18
2024	World Indoor Championships	Glasgow, United Kingdom	2nd	3000 m	8:21.13
2024	Olympic Games	Paris, France	12th	1500 m	4:01.27
2024	Olympic Games	Paris, France	9th	5000 m	14:45.21
2024	Olympic Games	Paris, France	6th	10,000 m	30:45.21
2025	World Indoor Championships	Nanjing, China	1st	1500 m i	3:54.86 CR
2025	World Championships	Tokyo, Japan	5th	5000 m	14:57.82
2025	World Championships	Tokyo, Japan	3rd	10,000 m	30:39.65

=== Circuit wins and titles, National titles ===
- Diamond League 5000 metres champion: 2023
  - 2018: Stockholm Bauhaus-galan (1500 m, MR PB)
  - 2023: Rabat Meeting International (1500 m, WL MR), London Anniversary Games (5000 m, MR PB), Eugene Prefontaine Classic (5000 m, WR)
- World Athletics Indoor Tour 1500 m overall winner: 2020, 2022
  - 2020 (1500m): Toruń Copernicus Cup, Liévin Meeting Hauts-de-France Pas-de-Calais, Villa de Madrid
  - 2021: Liévin (1500m, WR), Villa de Madrid (3000m)
  - 2022: Liévin (Mile, WL MR), Toruń (1500m, WL MR), Madrid (1500m, MR)
  - 2023: Toruń (Mile, WL MR), Liévin (1500m, WL), Birmingham World Indoor Tour Final (3000m, WL MR)
- Ethiopian Athletics Championships
  - 5000 metres: 2021
