= Melissa Duncan =

Australian middle-distance runner

Melissa Jane Duncan
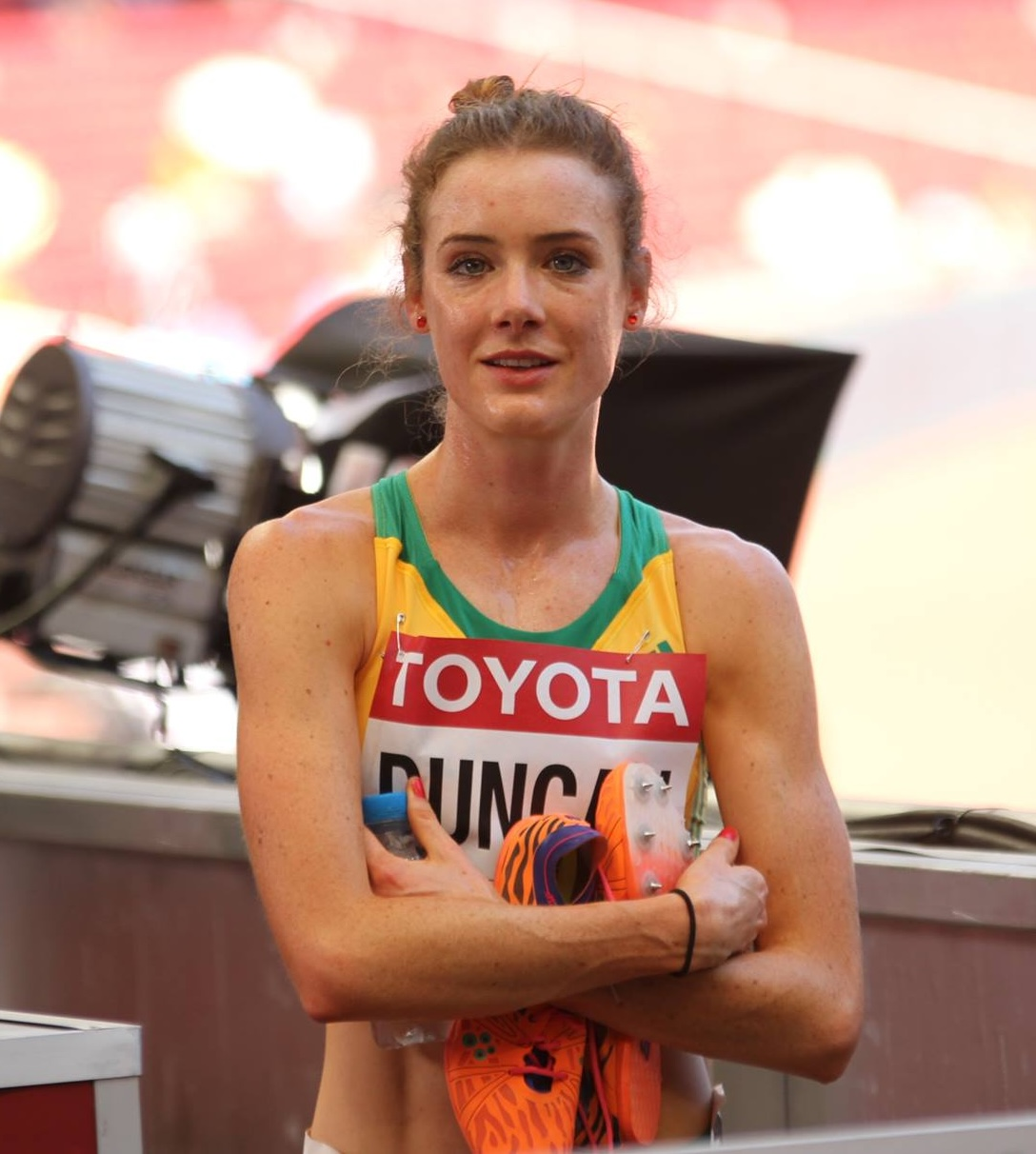

Personal information
- Nickname: Lissy
- Born: 30 January 1990 (age 35) Melbourne, Australia
- Height: 170 cm (5 ft 7 in)
- Weight: 55 kg (121 lb)

Sport
- Sport: Track and field
- Event(s): 1500 metres & 5000 metres
- Coached by: Philo Saunders & Nic Bideau

Melissa Duncan (born 30 January 1990) is an Australian middle-distance runner who competes primarily in the 1500 metres and 5000 metres.

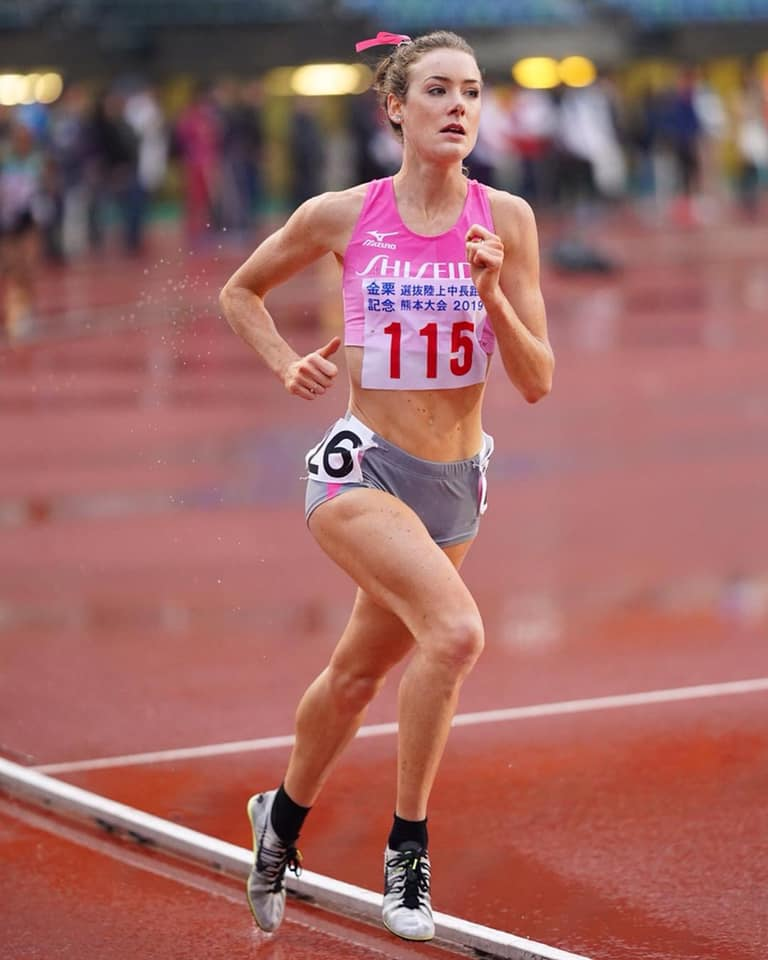
Duncan in Japan in 2019

At an International level she competed at the 2015 and 2019 World Championships in Athletics, the 2016 World Indoor Championships, 2014 Commonwealth Games and 2024 World Athletics Cross Country Championships and was the Gold Medallist at the 2019 Oceania Athletics Championships in the 5000m.

She was selected for the 2016 Olympic Games however had to withdraw due to injury.

After returning from injury, Duncan joined Nic Bideau's Melbourne Track Club and on his recommendation Duncan moved to Japan in 2019 to join the corporate Shiseido Running Club where she competed two seasons. Duncan in February 2024 said that her experience in Japan impacted her running career for the next three years and seriously affected her health.

On October 27, 2022, Duncan married fitness trainer Alice Baquie during a concert by singer Alex Lahey. The couple however separated in 2024.

== Competition record ==
| Year | Competition | Venue | Position | Event | Notes |
Representing Australia
| 2007 | World Youth Championships | Ostrava, Czech Republic | 4th | 1500 m | 4:20.24 |
| 2014 | IAAF World Relays | Nassau, Bahamas | 4th | 4 × 800 m relay | 8:13.26 |
| 2014 | IAAF World Relays | Nassau, Bahamas | 3rd | 4 × 1500 m relay | 17:08.65 |
| 2014 | Commonwealth Games | Glasgow, United Kingdom | 10th | 1500 m | 4:14.10 |
| 2015 | IAAF World Relays | Nassau, Bahamas | 4th | Distance medley relay | 10:46.94 |
| 2015 | World Championships | Beijing, China | 20th (h) | 1500 m | 4:09.29 |
| 2016 | World Indoor Championships | Portland, United States | 6th | 1500 m | 4:09.69 |
| 2019 | Oceania Championships | Townsville, Australia | 1st | 5000 m | 15:41.44 CR |
| 2019 | World Championships | Doha, Qatar | 20th (h) | 5000 m | 15:37.37 |
| 2024 | World Cross Country Championship | Belgrade, Serbia | 53rd | Senior Women | 35:40 |

== Personal bests ==
Outdoor

- 800 metres – 2:08.38 (Glendale. AUS - 31 January 2015)
- 1500 metres – 4:05.56 (Oslo. NOR - 11 June 2015)
- One Mile – 4:26.90 (Dublin. IRE - 11 July 2014)
- 3000 metres – 8:55.61 (Box Hill. AUS - 29 April 2021)
- 5000 metres – 15:18.43 (Nijmegen. NED - 8 June 2018)
- 10000 metres – 34:24.45 (Melbourne. AUS - 2 December 2023)
- Half Marathon – 1:13:03 (Melbourne. AUS - 8 September 2024)

Indoor

- 1500 metres – 4:06.93 (Boston - 14 February 2016)
