= Athletics at the 2016 Summer Olympics – Women's 1500 metres =

Women's 1500 metres at the Games of the XXXI Olympiad
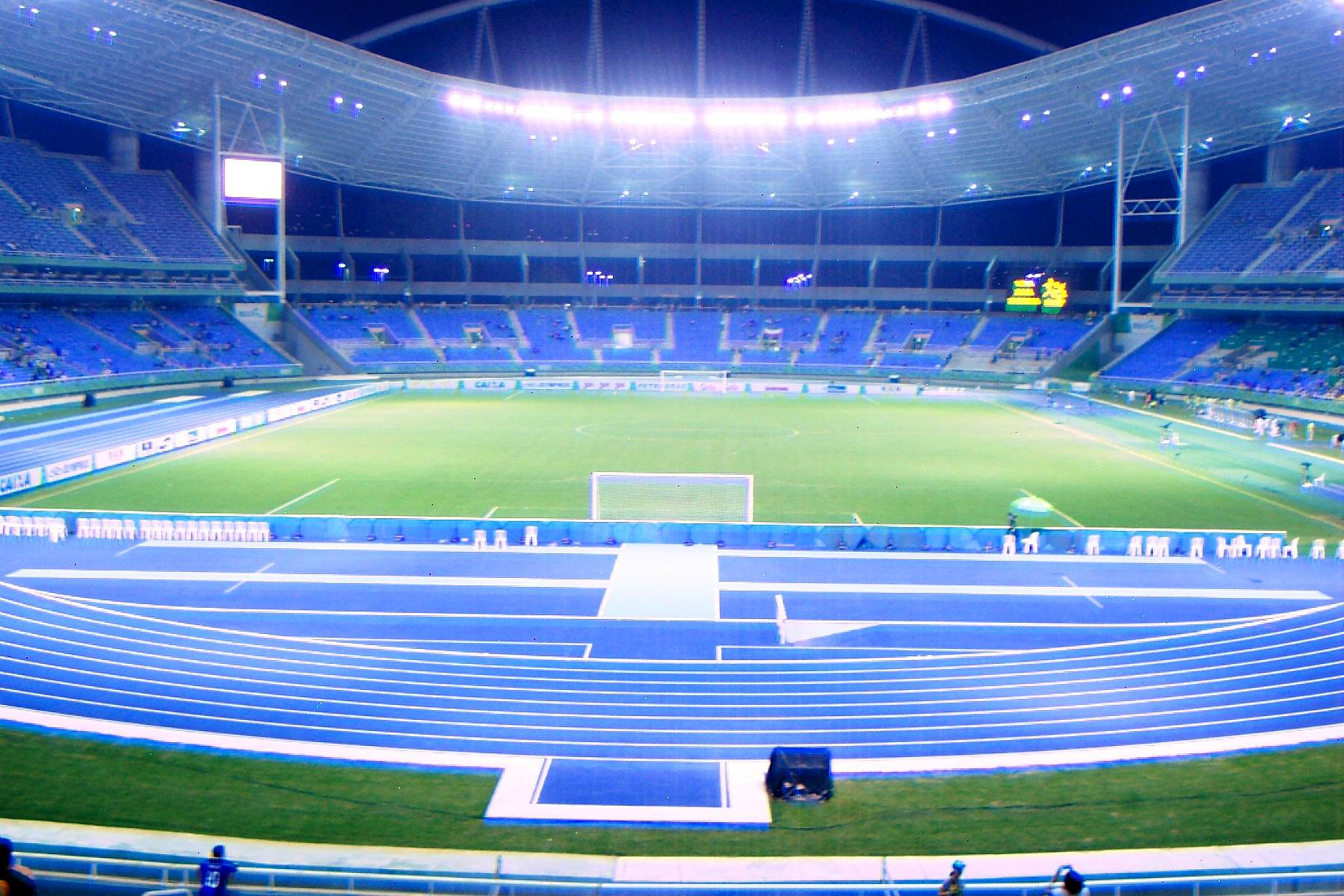
- Interior view of the Estádio Olímpico João Havelange, where the Women's 1500m took place.
- Venue: Olympic Stadium
- Dates: 12 August 2016 (heats); 14 August 2016 (semifinals); 16 August 2016 (final)
- Competitors: 42 from 25 nations
- Winning time: 4:08.92

Medalists
1st place, gold medalist(s)		Faith Kipyegon	Kenya
2nd place, silver medalist(s)		Genzebe Dibaba	Ethiopia
3rd place, bronze medalist(s)		Jennifer Simpson	United States

Video on YouTube Official Video Highlights

The women's 1500 metres event at the 2016 Summer Olympics took place between 12–16 August at the Olympic Stadium.

== Summary ==
Genzebe Dibaba, the world record holder and the 2015 World Champion had an injury affected outdoor season, though she was still the fourth fastest entrant. Faith Kipyegon, the 2015 World runner-up, was the form athlete before the Olympics, being unbeaten and owning the two fastest times for the season – a Kenyan record of 3:56.41 minutes. Laura Muir's British record placed her second on the seasonal rankings. Other top entrants included Ethiopians Dawit Seyaum and Besu Sado, Dutch athlete Sifan Hassan, and American former world medallists Jennifer Simpson, Brenda Martinez and Shannon Rowbury. The 2012 Olympic champion Aslı Çakır Alptekin was absent due to a doping ban, as were five other finalists from 2012, a race ESPN "one of the dirtiest races in Olympic history."

There were no surprise eliminations in the first round. Dawit Seyaum won the fastest heat in 4:05.33 minutes, with Kipyegon and Genzebe Dibaba being the other heat winners.

Many of these women were in the World Championship race and the world record run before it. They had a year to think about and prepare their way to beat Dibaba. The final started off in a walk for these athletes, the first lap in 1:16.57. Dibaba went almost to the back of the pack, with the last chaser in her previous major races, Sifan Hassan watching her back and only Laura Muir trailing. Shannon Rowbury was relegated to the unwanted leader duties until Laura Weightman moved forward near the end of the lap. After the slow first lap, even Muir tired of jogging at the back and moved forward, but not Dibaba and Hassan. By the steeplechase pit, 550 metres into the race, Dibaba ran a few quicker steps and moved to the outside, foretelling her move. Over the next 150 metres, Dibaba floated forward with ease, Hassan following. Over the next 100 metres, Dibaba cruised to the front, with each of the key figures in the race recognizing she had passed and scrambling to follow. With a lap and a half to go, Muir was tight on Dibaba's shoulder, followed by Faith Kipyegon, Besu Sado, Jennifer Simpson, Hassan and Rowbury. Dawit Seyaum came up from behind to join the mix of leaders but all were fighting not to let Dibaba get away. At the bell, Kipyegon had gotten around Muir and was right on Dibaba's back, a gap had separated between Muir and the next chaser, Hassan. The third lap was run in 56.80. Both Dibaba and Kipyegon appeared to be in full sprint, but Kipyegon stuck to Dibaba like glue down the backstretch. Then with just over 200 to go, Kipyegon accelerated around Dibaba. Dibaba had no answer. Kipyegon continued to extend her lead on to the finish line. Behind them was the battle for bronze. With 150 to go, Hassan caught Muir but Simpson was right on her back and Rowbury was gaining from behind. Coming off the turn, Simpson went into her sprint, which left Hassan behind. Rowbury also ran past Hassan and followed Simpson to the line. Dibaba tied up badly going in to the finish, with Simpson rapidly gaining, but the finish line arrived for Dibaba faster than a sprinting Simpson could get there.

Kipyegon ran her last 800 in 1:57.2, even faster than Dibaba ran her last 800 in Beijing.

The following evening the medals were presented by Dagmawit Girmay Berhane, IOC member, Ethiopia and Nawal El Moutawakel, Council Member of the IAAF.

== Records ==
Prior to this competition, the existing world and Olympic records were as follows.

World record	Genzebe Dibaba (ETH)	3:50.07	Fontvieille, Monaco	17 July 2015
Olympic record	Paula Ivan (ROU)	3:53.96	Seoul, South Korea	26 September 1988
2016 World leading	Faith Chepngetich Kipyegon (KEN)	3:56.41	Eugene, United States	28 May 2016

Area
Area	Time (s)	Athlete	Nation
Africa (records)	3:50.07 WR	Genzebe Dibaba	Ethiopia
Asia (records)	3:50.46	Qu Yunxia	China
Europe (records)	3:52.47	Tatyana Kazankina	Soviet Union
North, Central America and Caribbean (records)	3:56.29	Shannon Rowbury	United States
Oceania (records)	4:00.93	Sarah Jamieson	Australia
South America (records)	4:05.67	Letitia Vriesde	Suriname

The following national record was established during the competition:

Country	Athlete	Round	Time	Notes
Nepal	Saraswati Bhattarai (NEP)	Heats	4:33.94	

== Schedule ==
All times are Brasilia Time (UTC-3)

Date	Time	Round
Friday, 12 August 2016	20:30	Heats
Sunday, 14 August 2016	21:30	Semifinals
Tuesday, 16 August 2016	22:30	Finals

== Results ==
=== Heats ===
Qualification rule: first 6 in each heat (Q) and the next 6 fastest times (q) qualified.

==== Heat 1 ====
Rank	Athlete	Nation	Time	Notes
1	Genzebe Dibaba	Ethiopia	4:10.61	Q
2	Ciara Mageean	Ireland	4:11.51	Q
3	Brenda Martinez	United States	4:11.74	Q
4	Linden Hall	Australia	4:11.75	Q
5	Angelika Cichocka	Poland	4:11.76	Q
6	Konstanze Klosterhalfen	Germany	4:11.76	Q
7	Hilary Stellingwerff	Canada	4:12.00	
8	Maureen Koster	Netherlands	4:13.15	
9	Siham Hilali	Morocco	4:13.46	
10	Amela Terzić	Serbia	4:15.17	
11	Nancy Chepkwemoi	Kenya	4:15.41	
12	Marta Pen	Portugal	4:18.53	
13	Saraswati Bhattarai	Nepal	4:33.94	NR
14	Celma Bonfim da Graça	São Tomé and Príncipe	4:38.86	

==== Heat 2 ====
Rank	Athlete	Nation	Time	Notes
1	Sifan Hassan	Netherlands	4:06.64	Q
2	Faith Chepngetich Kipyegon	Kenya	4:06.65	Q
3	Sofia Ennaoui	Poland	4:06.90	Q
4	Jennifer Simpson	United States	4:06.99	Q
5	Malika Akkaoui	Morocco	4:07.42	Q, SB
6	Besu Sado	Ethiopia	4:08.11	Q
7	Laura Weightman	Great Britain	4:08.37	q
8	Jenny Blundell	Australia	4:09.05	q
9	Gabriela Stafford	Canada	4:09.45	
10	Muriel Coneo	Colombia	4:09.50	
11	Tigist Gashaw	Bahrain	4:10.96	
12	Florina Pierdevara	Romania	4:11.55	SB
13	Nikki Hamblin	New Zealand	4:11.88	
14	Anjelina Nadai Lohalith	Refugee Olympic Team	4:47.38	

==== Heat 3 ====
Rank	Athlete	Nation	Time	Notes
1	Dawit Seyaum	Ethiopia	4:05.33	Q
2	Shannon Rowbury	United States	4:06.47	Q
3	Laura Muir	Great Britain	4:06.53	Q
4	Rababe Arafi	Morocco	4:06.63	Q
5	Meraf Bahta	Sweden	4:06.82	Q
6	Zoe Buckman	Australia	4:06.93	Q
7	Nicole Sifuentes	Canada	4:07.43	q
8	Violah Cheptoo Lagat	Kenya	4:08.09	q
9	Danuta Urbanik	Poland	4:08.67	q
10	Diana Sujew	Germany	4:09.07	q
11	Margherita Magnani	Italy	4:09.74	
12	Kadra Mohamed Dembil	Djibouti	4:42.67	
13	Nelia Martins	Timor-Leste	5:00.53	
	Betthem Desalegn	United Arab Emirates		DNS

=== Semifinals ===
==== Semifinals 1 ====
Rank	Athlete	Nation	Time	Notes
1	Faith Chepngetich Kipyegon	Kenya	4:03.95	Q
2	Dawit Seyaum	Ethiopia	4:04.23	Q
3	Shannon Rowbury	United States	4:04.46	Q, SB
4	Besu Sado	Ethiopia	4:05.19	Q
5	Laura Weightman	Great Britain	4:05.28	Q
6	Sofia Ennaoui	Poland	4:05.29	q
7	Rababe Arafi	Morocco	4:05.60	q
8	Linden Hall	Australia	4:05.81	
9	Zoe Buckman	Australia	4:06.95	
10	Konstanze Klosterhalfen	Germany	4:07.26	
11	Ciara Mageean	Ireland	4:08.07	
12	Brenda Martinez	United States	4:10.41	

==== Semifinals 2 ====
Rank	Athlete	Nation	Time	Notes
1	Genzebe Dibaba	Ethiopia	4:03.06	Q
2	Sifan Hassan	Netherlands	4:03.62	Q
3	Laura Muir	Great Britain	4:04.16	Q
4	Jennifer Simpson	United States	4:05.07	Q
5	Meraf Bahta	Sweden	4:06.41	Q
6	Violah Cheptoo Lagat	Kenya	4:06.83	
7	Nicole Sifuentes	Canada	4:08.53	
8	Malika Akkaoui	Morocco	4:08.55	
9	Diana Sujew	Germany	4:10.15	
10	Danuta Urbanik	Poland	4:11.34	
11	Jenny Blundell	Australia	4:13.25	
12	Angelika Cichocka	Poland	4:17.83	

=== Final ===
Rank	Athlete	Nation	Time	Notes
1st place, gold medalist(s)	Faith Chepngetich Kipyegon	Kenya	4:08.92	
2nd place, silver medalist(s)	Genzebe Dibaba	Ethiopia	4:10.27	
3rd place, bronze medalist(s)	Jennifer Simpson	United States	4:10.53	
4	Shannon Rowbury	United States	4:11.05	
5	Sifan Hassan	Netherlands	4:11.23	
6	Meraf Bahta	Sweden	4:12.59	
7	Laura Muir	Great Britain	4:12.88	
8	Dawit Seyaum	Ethiopia	4:13.14	
9	Besu Sado	Ethiopia	4:13.58	
10	Sofia Ennaoui	Poland	4:14.72	
11	Laura Weightman	Great Britain	4:14.95	
12	Rababe Arafi	Morocco	4:15.16	
