= Cory McGee =

American middle-distance runner, Olympian

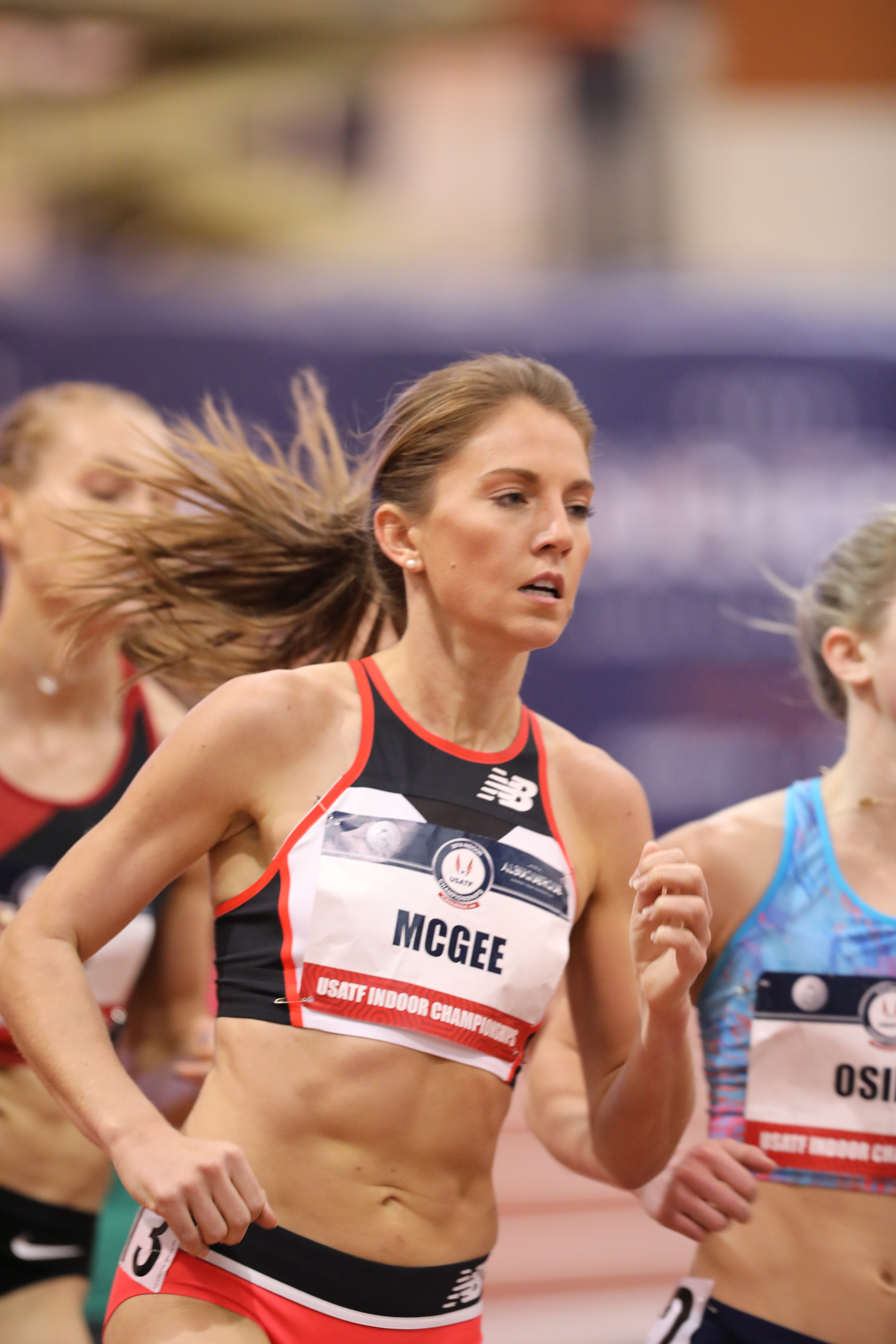
- McGee at the 2018 USA Indoor Track and Field Championships

Personal information
- Born: Cory Ann McGee; May 29, 1992 (age 34) Fairfax, Virginia, U.S.

Sport
- Country: United States
- Sport: Athletics
- Event: 1500 m
- College team: University of Florida Gators
- Club: New Balance
- Coached by: Joe Bosshard

Achievements and titles
- World finals: 2009 1500m (9th place) Youth; 2013 1500m (31st place)
- Personal bests: 800 m: 1:59.17 (2021); 1500 m: 3:57.44 (2024); Mile: 4:18.11 (2023)
Medal record
Women's athletics
Representing the United States
Pan American Junior Championships
Gold medal – first place	2011 Miramar	1500 m

Cory Ann McGee (born May 29, 1992) is an American professional middle distance runner and Olympian from Pass Christian, Mississippi. At the 2020 Tokyo Olympic Games she finished 12th in the 1500-meters. She was the 2011 Pan American U20 Champion and 2011 USA Juniors Outdoor Champion in the 1500-meters. In May 2022 she ran a personal best of 4:00.34 in the 1500-meters to move to 16th place on the US fastest all-time list.

== High school career ==
McGee attended Pass Christian High School in Pass Christian, Mississippi where she was the 2010 Mississippi Class 4A State Champion in the 800-meters and 1,600-meters events. During her senior year she ran in several high-profile events. On January 29, 2010, she won the high school mile in 4:52.77 at the 103rd Millrose Games in New York City. Then on Feb 6th, she finished 3rd in the mile running 4:50.06 at the U20 Reebok Indoor Games in Boston, followed by a second-place finish in 4:46.63 at the Boston Nike Indoor Championships. In June, she ran in the Adidas Jim Ryun Girl's Dream Mile at the New York Diamond League.

In high school, McGee had personal-record times of 2:10.04 (800m) 4:25.88 (1,500m), 4:49 (1,600m), 10:39.57 (3,200m), 17:29 (XC 5K).

== Early career ==
McGee finished 9th at 2009 World Youth Championships in Athletics 1500m (4:30.20). McGee was 2009 1500-meters runner-up USATF World Youth Outdoor Championships in 4:25.98. She placed ninth in 4:30.20 at the 2009 IAAF World Youth Championships representing USA in Bressanone, Italy.

McGee finished 3rd in the 1500 meters at the 2013 USA Outdoor Track and Field Championships and later obtained the 'B' standard to be able to represent the United States at the 2013 World Championships in Athletics. At the 2013 World Championships she finished 10th in her heat.

== College career ==
McGee attended the University of Florida from 2010 to 2014 where she ran track and cross-country. She was an NCAA runner-up and ten-time NCAA Division I Track and Field All-American recognized by U.S. Track & Field and Cross-Country Coaches Association (Eight-time All American miler/1500 m and Two-time All-American in Distance Medley Relay).

McGee was 2011 1500 m champ USATF Junior Outdoor Championships in 4:21.91. She went on to win at the Junior Pan-Am games representing USA in Miramar, FL.

Year	SEC Cross Country	NCAA Cross Country	SEC Indoor	NCAA Indoor	SEC Outdoor	NCAA Outdoor
2010-11			9:36.25 - 7th 4:41.10 - 1st	4:41.52 - 10th	2:09.07 - 8th 4:27.45 - 2nd	4:19.18 - 10th
2011-12			4:41.36 - 3rd 9:26.23 - 3rd 11:18.46 - 3rd	4:45.30 - 11th 11:08.60 - 5th	2:05.39 - 6th 4:15.46 - 2nd	4:14.95 - 6th
2012-13			9:15.67 - 2nd 4:35.33 - 1st 11:13.45 - 1st	4:39.05 - 11th	16:21.86 - 6th 4:15.80 - 2nd	4:13.94 - 2nd
2013-14	21:01.2 - 16th	21:13.1 - 83rd	9:10.48 - 1st 4:35.03 - 2nd 11:08.11 - 1st	4:39.61 - 4th 11:12.12 - 4th	16:03.06 - 5th 4:13.48 - 1st	4:19.19 - 2nd

== Professional career ==
In September 2014, McGee signed with New Balance and would be coached by Mark Coogan.

McGee finished 7th in the 1500 meters at the 2014 USA Outdoor Track and Field Championships.

McGee finished 11th in the 1500 meters at the 2015 USA Outdoor Track and Field Championships. She finished in fourth place at the Athletics at the 2015 Pan American Games – Women's 1500 metres where she ran 4:11.12.

McGee earned silver in the 1500 meters at 2016 USA Indoor Track and Field Championships, running 4:09.97. She later placed 13th 2016 IAAF World Indoor Championships – Women's 1500 metres.

McGee finished second in the women's 1500m at the 2020 US Olympic Trials, qualifying for her first Olympic berth.

McGee finished 3rd in the 1500 at the 2023 United States Track and Field Championships, running 4:04.58, qualifying her for the 2023 World Championships in Budapest.

== Competition record ==
Year	Competition	Venue	Position	Event	Notes
Representing United States
2009	2009 IAAF World Youth Championships	Brixen, Italy	10th	1500 meters	4:30.20
2011	2011 Pan American Junior Athletics Championships	Miramar, Florida	1st	1500 meters	4:35.46
2013	2013 World Championships in Athletics	Moscow, Russia	31st	1500 meters	4:12.33
2015	2015 Pan American Games	Toronto, Canada	4th	1500 meters	4:11.12
2016	2016 IAAF World Indoor Championships	Portland, Oregon USA	13th	1500 meters	4:11.62
2021	2020 Summer Olympics	Tokyo, Japan	12th	1500 meters	4:05.50
2022	World Athletics Championships	Eugene, Oregon	10th	1500 meters	4:03.70
2023	World Athletics Championships	Budapest, Hungary	10th	1500 meters	4:01.60
USATF Outdoor Championships, USA Indoor Track and Field Championships
2008	USA Junior Outdoor Track and Field Championships	Columbus, Ohio	5th	1500 meters	4:25.88
2009	USA Outdoor World Youth Track and Field Trials	Ypsilanti, Michigan	2nd	1500 meters	4:25.98
2010	USA Junior Outdoor Track and Field Championships	Des Moines, Iowa	3rd	1500 meters	4:27.98
2011	USA Junior Outdoor Track and Field Championships	Eugene, Oregon	1st	1500 meters	4:21.91
2012	USA Olympic Trials	Eugene, Oregon	25th	1500 meters	4:17.76
2013	USA Outdoor Track and Field Championships	Des Moines, Iowa	3rd	1500 meters	4:29.70
2014	USA Outdoor Track and Field Championships	Sacramento, California	7th	1500 meters	4:12.16
2015	USA Outdoor Track and Field Championships	Eugene, Oregon	11th	1500 meters	4:18.55
2016	USA Indoor Track and Field Championships	Portland, Oregon	2nd	1500 meters	4:09.97
2016	USA Olympic Trials	Eugene, Oregon	13th	1500 meters	4:12.19
2017	USA Indoor Track and Field Championships	Albuquerque, New Mexico	4th	1 mile	4:46.54
2018	USA Indoor Track and Field Championships	Albuquerque, New Mexico	5th	1500 meters	4:15.38
2018	USA Outdoor Track and Field Championships	Des Moines, Iowa	21st	1500 meters	4:15.66
2019	USA Indoor Track and Field Championships	Ocean Breeze Athletic Complex	3rd	1 mile	4:30.14
2019	USA Outdoor Track and Field Championships	Des Moines, Iowa	20th - DQ	1500 meters	4:20.17
2021	United States Olympic Trials	Eugene, Oregon	2nd	1500 meters	4:00.67
2022	USA Indoor Track and Field Championships	Spokane, Washington	4th	1500 meters	4:07.27
2022	USA Outdoor Track and Field Championships	Eugene, Oregon	2nd	1500 meters	4:04.52
2023	USA Outdoor Track and Field Championships	Eugene, Oregon	3rd	1500 meters	4:03.48
2024	USA Olympic Trials	Eugene, Oregon	5th	1500 meters	3:57.44
