= Dawit Seyaum =

Ethiopian middle-distance runner (born 1996)

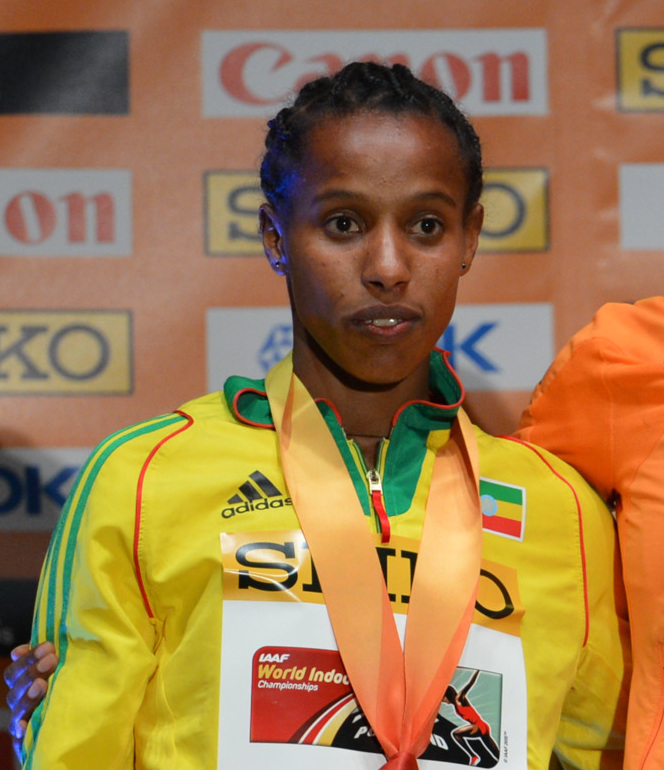
- Dawit at the 2016 World Indoor Championships in Portland

Personal information
- Full name: Dawit Seyaum Biratu
- Nationality: Ethiopian
- Born: 27 July 1996 (age 30)
- Height: 1.61 m (5 ft 3 in)
- Weight: 49 kg (108 lb)

Sport
- Country: Ethiopia
- Sport: Athletics
- Events: 1500 metres, 5000 m

Achievements and titles
- Personal bests: 1500 m: 3:58.09 (Paris 2016); 3000 m: 8:23.24i (Liévin 2022); 5000 m: 14:25.84 (Oslo 2022); Road; 5 km: 14:39 (Lille 2021); Half marathon: 1:07.52 (Manama 2021)
Medal record
Women's athletics
Representing Ethiopia
World Championships
Bronze medal – third place	2022 Eugene	5000 m
World Indoor Championships
Silver medal – second place	2016 Portland	1500 m
African Games
Gold medal – first place	2015 Brazzaville	1500 m
African Championships
Silver medal – second place	2014 Marrakesh	1500 m
World Junior Championships
Gold medal – first place	2014 Eugene	1500 m
African Junior Championships
Gold medal – first place	2013 Bambous	1500 m
Gold medal – first place	2015 Addis Ababa	1500 m
World Youth Championships
Silver medal – second place	2013 Donetsk	1500 m

Dawit Seyaum Biratu (born 27 July 1996) is an Ethiopian middle- and long-distance runner who specialises in the 1500 metres. She placed fourth at the 2015 World Championships and won the silver medal at the 2016 World Indoor Championships. Dawit took a bronze in the 5000 metres at the 2022 World Championships.

She was in her specialist event the 2013 World Youth Championship silver medallist, and 2014 World junior champion.

== Career ==
Dawit Seyaum made her first impact at national level in 2013, winning the 1500 metres Ethiopian junior title. Her international debut on the IAAF Diamond League circuit followed shortly after, and she set a personal best of 4:14.95 minutes in the event at the Doha Diamond League meet. She was selected to compete in the 1500 m at the 2013 World Youth Championships in Athletics held in Donetsk, Ukraine and was runner-up to Tigist Gashaw – the first time Ethiopia took the top two spots in that event. She reversed this placing at the 2013 African Junior Championships, taking the title with a best of 4:09.00 minutes several seconds ahead of Tigist.

Dawit won her first indoor competition in Prague in February 2014, running 1500 m with a time of 4:09.08 minutes. At the Rabat Meeting, she established herself among the world's top 1500 m runners with a win in 3:59.53 minutes – an Ethiopian junior record and meeting record which ranked her seventh in the global rankings that year. She was near four minutes again at the New York Diamond League, where she finished as runner-up. Dawit entered the World Junior Championships in Eugene as favourite and delivered on this by winning the gold medal, going unchallenged throughout the final lap. Her first senior medal followed at the African Championships in Athletics, where she was the silver medallist behind the more experienced Hellen Obiri. Dawit was chosen for the Africa team for the 2014 IAAF Continental Cup and finished with the bronze medal behind Sifan Hassan and Shannon Rowbury.

In 2015, she secured in the 1500 m a gold at the African Junior Championships, placed fourth at the World Championships in Beijing (behind, 1–3, Genzebe Dibaba, Faith Kipyegon and Sifan Hassan), and won the event at the African Games held in Brazzaville.

The next year, Dawit took the World Indoor Championship silver in her specialist event in Portland, and finished eight in the final of the 2016 Rio Olympics.

The 2018 World Indoor Championships held in Birmingham were unsuccessful for her as she was eliminated in the heats.

In February 2022, Dawit set a world-leading time of 8:23.24 for the indoor 3000 metres at the Meeting Hauts-de-France Pas-de-Calais in Liévin, becoming the third-fastest woman in this indoor event in history (only her compatriots Dibaba and Gudaf Tsegay ran faster). She finished fifth at the event in 8:44.55 at the World Indoor Championships in Belgrade the following month.

At the 2022 World Championships in Eugene, Oregon in July, Dawit competed in the 5000 metres event and claimed the bronze medal in a time of 14:47.36 behind Tsegay (14:46.29) and Beatrice Chebet (14:46.75). She ended that year on high, winning for the second consecutive time the 5 kilometres road race at the BOclassic held in Bolzano, Italy (in 2021, she set a course record).

== Achievements ==
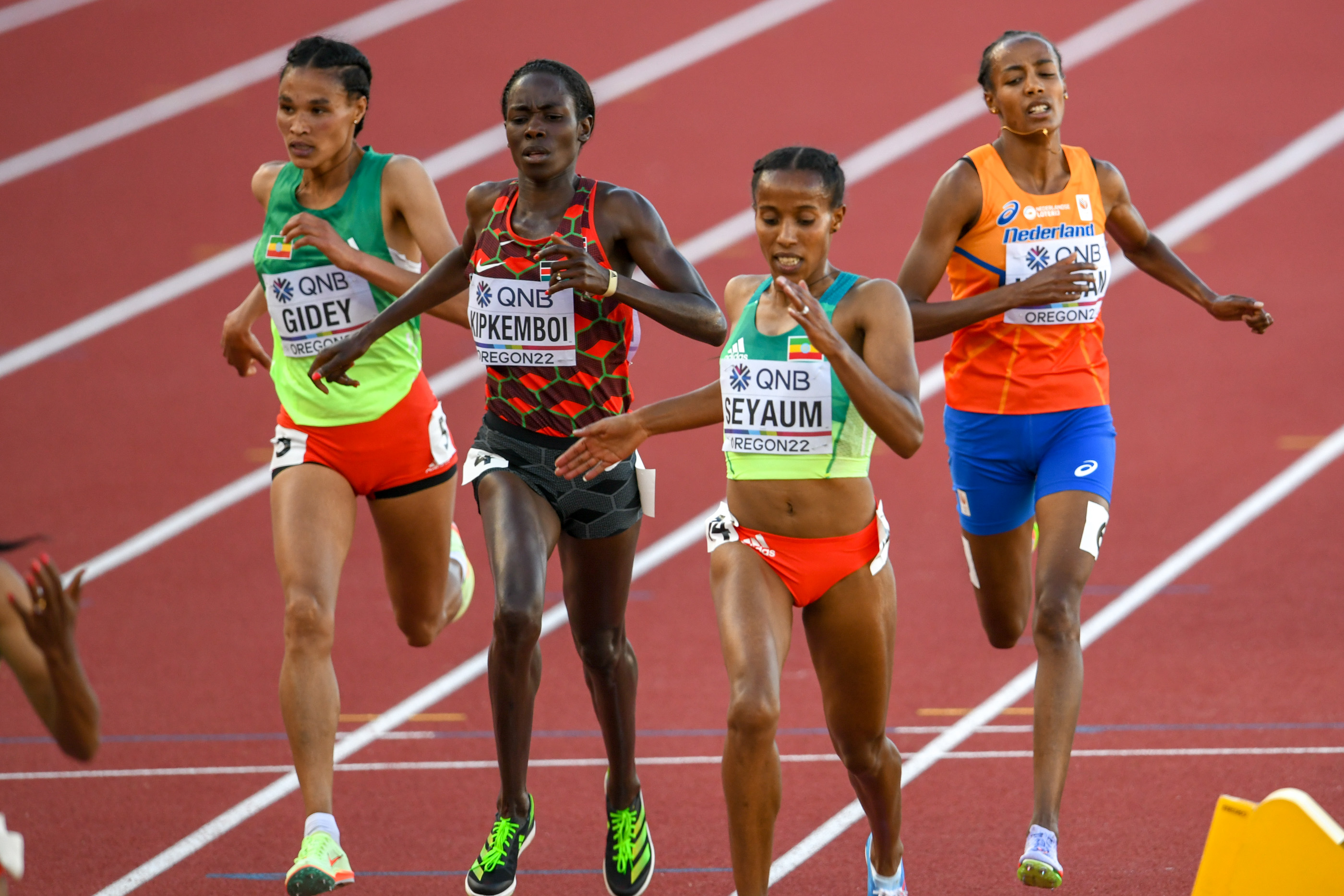
Dawit (2nd from the right) won the bronze medal for the 5000 m at the 2022 World Championships in Eugene.

=== International competitions ===
Representing Ethiopia
Year	Competition	Venue	Position	Event	Time
2013	World Youth Championships	Donetsk, Ukraine	2nd	1500 m	4:15.51
2013	African Junior Championships	Bambous, Mauritius	1st	1500 m	4:09.00
2014	World Junior Championships	Eugene, United States	1st	1500 m	4:09.86
2014	African Championships	Marrakesh, Morocco	2nd	1500 m	4:10.92
2014	Continental Cup	Marrakesh, Morocco	3rd	1500 m	4:07.61
2015	African Junior Championships	Addis Ababa, Ethiopia	1st	1500 m	4:15.94
2015	World Championships	Beijing, China	4th	1500 m	4:10.26
2015	African Games	Brazzaville, Republic of the Congo	1st	1500 m	4:16.69
2016	World Indoor Championships	Portland, United States	2nd	1500 m i	4:05.30
2016	Olympic Games	Rio de Janeiro, Brazil	8th	1500 m	4:13.14
2018	World Indoor Championships	Birmingham, United Kingdom	14th (h)	1500 m i	4:10.20
2022	World Indoor Championships	Belgrade, Serbia	5th	3000 m i	8:44.55
2022	World Championships	Eugene, United States	3rd	5000 m	14:47.36

=== Personal bests ===
- 1500 metres – 3:58.09 (Paris 2016)
  - 1500 metres indoor – 4:00.28 (Boston 2016)
- 2000 metres – 5:32.40 (Zagreb 2021)
  - 2000 metres indoor – 5:35.46 (Boston 2015) World under-20 best
  - 3000 metres indoor – 8:23.24 (Liévin 2022)
- 5000 metres – 14:25.84 (Oslo 2022)

Road

- 5 kilometres – 14:39 (Lille 2021)
- 10 kilometres – 31:25 (Geneva 2021)

=== Circuit wins ===
- Diamond League
  - 2015 (1500 m): Doha
  - 2017 (1500 m): Birmingham British Grand Prix
  - 2022 (5000 m): Birmingham (WL MR), Oslo Bislett Games (PB)
