= Brenda Martinez =

American middle-distance runner

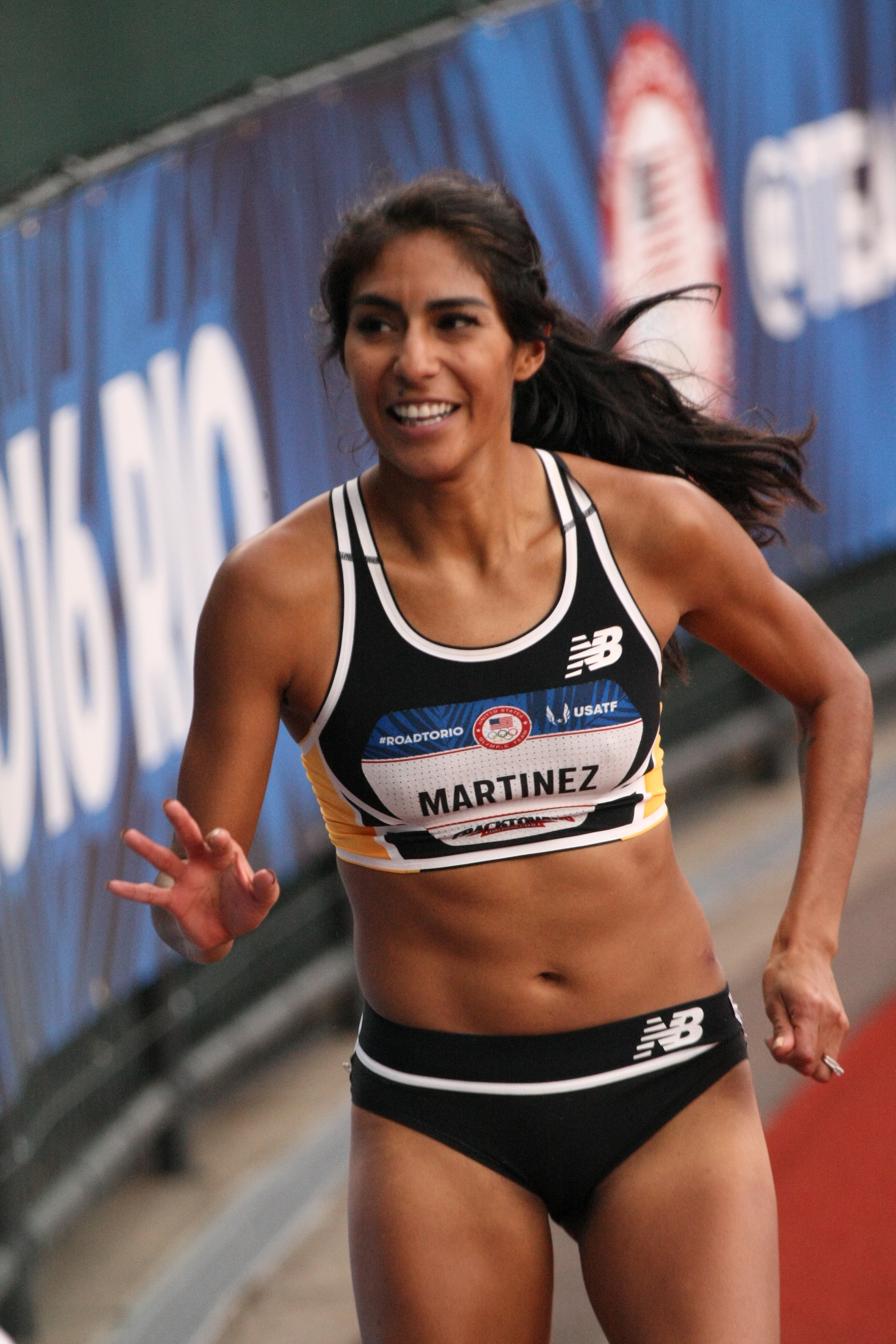
- Martinez at the 2016 Olympic Trials

Medal record

Women's athletics

Representing the United States

World Championships
| Silver medal – second place | 2013 Moscow | 800 m |

World Relay Championships
| Gold medal – first place | 2014 Nassau | 4×800 m relay |
| Silver medal – second place | 2014 Nassau | 4×1500 m relay |

Brenda Martinez (born September 8, 1987) is an American middle-distance runner and Olympian. Born in Upland, California, she won a silver medal in the 800 meters at the 2013 IAAF World Championships in Moscow and finished first in the 800 meters at the 2014 Diamond League Final. She represented the US at the 2012 IAAF World Indoor Championships in the 1500 meters. Martinez twice set the world record in the Distance Medley Relay at the New Balance Indoor Grand Prix in Boston; first on February 7, 2015, and then breaking her own record on January 28, 2017. In 2016, Martinez qualified for the U.S. Olympic team competing in the 1500 meters after beating Amanda Eccleston by 0.03 seconds.

Her training is planned by veteran coach Joe Vigil and assisted by Martinez's husband and former Concordia University (California) runner, Carlos Handler. In 2015, along with her husband, she started Big Bear Track Club, a nonprofit, working with post-collegians to help develop American distance runners into world-class athletes. Their first recruited was Boris Berian.

== High school ==
Martinez attended Rancho Cucamonga High School, graduating in 2005. She was a four-year letter winner in track and cross country where she was coached by Carlton Austen. Martinez was the school record holder in the 1600m (4:55), 800m (2:16), two mile (11:12), and three mile (17:28). She also ran with the West Coast Gazelle Track Club.

== College career ==
Martinez ran collegiately for University of California at Riverside ("UCR") from 2006 to 2010, where she was coached by Joe Vigil. She is a three time All-American. She earned Big West All-Conference honors in 2007, 2008 and 2009. She finished second at the 2009 NCAA Women's Outdoor Track and Field Championships in the 1500 meters and ninth in the 800-meters at the USA Track and Field Nationals.

Martinez was named the 2009 Big West Track Athlete of the Year and while at UCR was recognized seven-times as the Big West Athlete of the Week.

She established several outdoor UCR school records including the women's 800m (2:02.34), 1500m (4:13.58), and 5000m (16:27.51) events. She was a member of UCR's outdoor distance medley relay team that set the record for fastest time in program history with a time of 11:13.72. Martinez also set indoor school records in the mile (4:39.58) and 3000m (9:17.60) events and was a member of UCR's indoor distance medley relay that set the school record with a time of 11:29.34.

In 2008, Martinez was named UC Riverside Female Athlete of the Year. That same year she participated at the US Olympic Trials held in Eugene, Oregon where she finished 6th in the semi-finals of the 800-meters.

== Professional career ==
=== 2010 ===
In 2010, Martinez signed a professional contract with New Balance.

=== 2012 ===
In 2012, Martinez finished second in the 1500 meters at the USA Indoor Championships in addition to winning the U.S. Open Mile indoors at Madison Square Garden. She also won titles at the 5th Avenue Mile (4:24.2 road PR) and the Falmouth Mile (4:26.76, fastest female Miler in 2012 on the track).

=== 2013 ===
At the 2013 IAAF World Championships at 800-meters in Moscow, Martinez ran a spectacular final 100-meters surging from 6th place to 3rd to capture the bronze medal in 1:57.91; a personal best. She finished one-tenth of a second behind Russia's Mariya Savinova (1:57.80), who grabbed the silver. The race was won by Kenya's Eunice Sum in 1:57.38. With her 3rd-place finish, Martinez became the first American female to medal in an outdoor World Championship 800-meters event. In 2017, Martinez's bronze medal was upgraded to silver after the Court of Arbitration for Sport (CAS) banned Savinova and stripped her of both her World Championship medals (2011 and 2013) and her Olympic gold medal from 2012 for using a performance enhance drug.

At the inaugural IAAF World Relays 2014 hosted by the Bahamas in late May, she anchored the women's 4x800 to a gold medal and U.S. record (8:01.58) and also was a member of the 4x1500 silver medal team. In 2013, she won the 2013 B.A.A. Invitational Mile in 4:51.4 on the streets of downtown Boston the day before the storied Boston Marathon. She was also a member of the U.S. record setting 4 × 800 m team at the 2013 Penn Relays; the team collectively smashed the old mark by 13 seconds with their 8:04.31.

=== 2015 ===
In a thrilling distance race at the 2015 New Balance Indoor Grand Prix at Boston's Reggie Lewis Center on February 7, 2015, Martinez caught Nicole Tully of the NY All-Stars in the final meters to win the distance medley relay in 10:42.57. Tully finished in 10:42.79. The New Balance quartet's winning time set a world record smashing the old-world record of 10:50.98. Besides Martinez, the American team included Sarah Brown, Mahogany Jones and former Dartmouth College track star, Megan Krumpoch. Their times were: Brown (1200m - 3:15.54), Jones (400m - 53.59), Krumpoch (800m - 2:05.68) and Martinez (1600m - 4:27.77).

=== 2016 ===
On March 12, 2016, Martinez won the 2016 USA Indoor 1500-meters title (her first) in Portland, Oregon, clocking 4:08.37. Later than year, Martinez qualified to run in two events at the US Olympic Trials, her specialty, the 800-meters and her secondary event, the 1500-meters. She missed out qualifying in the 800-meters when she tripped over another runner finished seventh in the final in 2:06.63. In the lead up to the final, Martinez ran two superb preliminary heats where she finished first in both (2:00.85 and then 1:59.64). She bounced back finishing third in 4:06.16 in the 1500-meters, diving at the finish line to earn her first Olympic team berth. At the 2016 Rio Olympics, in her preliminary heat, she finished third in 4:11.74, but failed to make it out of the semi-final heat where she crossed the line in 12th place with a 4:10:41. In an interview with World Athletics, Martinez said of her Olympic performance, "“To race six races in 10 days was one of the hardest challenges I’d faced in my career. I was on a high, but by the time I got to the Olympic Games I had nothing left and I was completely drained. The motivation was still there, and I hoped that once I got to Rio I would be fine, but that wasn’t the case. Looking back, competing in my first Olympic Games was a great learning experience and after I took my end-of-season break I decided to approach training and racing a little differently. I took on an attitude that I had nothing to lose in training and I think that has also been reflected in my racing, where I have adopted a less conservative approach."

=== 2017 ===
On January 28, 2017, Martinez, along with Emma Coburn, Sydney McLaughlin, and Jenny Simpson set a world-best time of 10:40.31 in the Distance Medley Relay (DMR) at the 2017 New Balance Indoor Grand Prix at Boston's Reggie Lewis Center. Although news accounts reported it as" breaking a world record," the DMR was not recognized for world record sanctioning in 2017 by World Athletics because it was run on an indoor, banked track, rather than outdoors. Nevertheless, it was a remarkable feat, with the US track community continuing to acknowledge it as a world record. Coburn ran the opening leg (1200m, 3:18.40), followed by Powell (400m, 52.32), then Martinez (800m, 2:01.94), with Simpson anchoring the team (1600m, 4:27.66). Martinez broke her previous world best of 10:42.57 which was run at this meeting in 2015 by herself and fellow Americans Sarah Brown, Mahogany Jones and Megan Krumpoch.

In 2017, Martinez finished 4th at the 5th Avenue Mile, setting a personal best of 4:18.4, and was runner-up at the Long Island Mile finishing in 4:28.96. On December 17th, Martinez posted on her Twitter account that she had renew her contract with New Balance saying, "I am Honored and Proud to announce that I have renewed my contract with New Balance through the end of 2020! This will mark a 10-year relationship. I can’t express the love I have for my job, forever grateful! #TeamNB4Life @NBRunning."

== Post-competition activities ==
Martinez had spoken regularly at high schools and running camps, so her coach Joe Vigil suggested she start her own running camp for young girls. Her first camp in 2013 consisted of five California middle school and high school girls. There is no official camp name, but it can be referred to as the Big Bear Altitude Training Camp. 2017 marked the camp's fifth year.

The application process consists of an open prompt essay and campers have to live in Southern California. "Picking a stack, that’s the hardest part," Martinez said, referring to her application process. The campers are not necessarily their schools' fastest runners, but that's not the point. "I want to get them to believe they can do it even when times are getting tough," she said. "They see me as an example. I share my story with them, and they share their stories with me. It’s the reason they’re at camp. Storytelling brings us together."

Over the course of about three full days, the campers, coached by Martinez and a few of her friends, get to know one another over home-cooked meals, seminars, and runs. The group runs twice a day, but the focus isn't on intense workouts. Evening seminars, led by Martinez and her physical therapist, range from injury prevention to positive thinking.

== Personal life ==
Brenda Saucedo Martinez is the daughter of Andres and Rosa Maria Martinez and has one brother and one sister. She is of Mexican American heritage and is married to Carlos Handler. In college she majored in sociology and law. She was the first member of her family to attend college.

== Competition record ==
| Year | Competition | Venue | Position | Event | Notes |
Representing the United States
| 2012 | World Indoor Championships | Istanbul, Turkey | 6th (h) | 1500 m | 4:11.30 |
| 2013 | World Championships | Moscow, Russia | 2nd | 800 m | 1:57.91 |
| 2015 | New Balance Indoor Grand Prix | Boston, Massachusetts | 1st | DMR | 10:42.57^{[a]} |
| 2016 | World Indoor Championships | Portland, Oregon | 5th | 1500 m | 4:09.57 |
| 2016 | Olympic Games | Rio de Janeiro, Brazil | 21st (sf) | 1500 m | 4:10.41 |
| 2017 | New Balance Indoor Grand Prix | Boston, Massachusetts | 1st | DMR | 10:40.31^{[a]} |

^{a} World record

=== National championships ===
| Year | Competition | Venue | Position | Event | Notes |
|---|---|---|---|---|---|
| 2008 | US Olympic Trials | Eugene, Oregon | 10th | 800m | 2:05.10 |
| 2009 | USA Outdoor Track and Field Championships | Eugene, Oregon | 9th | 800m | 2:04.85 |
| 2012 | USA Indoor Track and Field Championships | Albuquerque, New Mexico | 2nd | 1500 m | 4:15.11 |
| 2012 | US Olympic Trials | Eugene, Oregon | 12th | 1500 m | 4:10.73 |
| 2012 | US Olympic Trials | Eugene, Oregon | 6th | 800 m | 2:01.67 |
| 2013 | USA Outdoor Track and Field Championships | Des Moines, Iowa | 2nd | 800 m | 1:58.78 |
| 2014 | USA Outdoor Track and Field Championships | Sacramento, California | 5th | 800 m | 2:00.18 |
| 2015 | USA Outdoor Track and Field Championships | Eugene, Oregon | 2nd | 800 m | 1:59.71 |
| 2016 | USA Indoor Track and Field Championships | Portland, Oregon | 1st | 1500 m | 4:08.37 |
| 2016 | US Olympic Trials | Eugene, Oregon | 7th | 800 m | 2:06.63 |
| 2016 | US Olympic Trials | Eugene, Oregon | 3rd | 1500 m | 4:06.16 |
| 2017 | USA Outdoor Track and Field Championships | Sacramento, California | 3rd | 800 m | 1:58.46 |

=== Personal bests ===
| | Event | Time | Date | Location |
|---|---|---|---|---|
| Outdoor | 800 m | 1:57.91 | 18 August 2013 | Moscow, Russia |
| Outdoor | 1000 m | 2:38.48 | 26 August 2012 | Dubnica nad Váhom, Slovakia |
| Outdoor | 1500 m | 4:00.94 | 19 July 2013 | Stade Louis II, Monaco |
| Outdoor | Mile | 4:26.76 | 11 August 2012 | Falmouth, Massachusetts |
| Outdoor | 2 Miles | 9:32.82 | 27 April 2018 | Des Moines, Iowa |
| Outdoor | 5000 m | 15:35.65 | 9 March 2013 | Fullerton, California |
| Outdoor | 5 km | 15:24 | 30 March 2014 | Carlsbad, California |
| Indoor | 800 m | 2:00.14 | 20 February 2016 | New York City, New York |
| Indoor | 1500 m | 4:04.58 | 14 February 2016 | Boston, Massachusetts |
| Indoor | Mile | 4:29.11 | 26 January 2019 | Boston, Massachusetts |
| Indoor | 3000 m | 9:07.99 | 2 February 2013 | Boston, Massachusetts |
| Indoor | 2 Miles | 9:51.91 | 2 February 2013 | Boston, Massachusetts |
| Indoor | Distance Medley Relay | 10:40:31 | 28 January 2017 | Boston, Massachusetts |
