= 2020 World Athletics Indoor Tour =

2020 IAAF World Indoor Tour
- Edition: 5th
- Dates: 25 January - 21 February
- Meetings: 7

The 2020 IAAF World Indoor Tour was the fifth edition of the World Athletics Indoor Tour, the highest series of international track and field indoor meetings.

The Tour retains seven events for 2020, six in Europe and one in the United States. All six 2019 meetings returned, although the order of the meetings has been rearranged from 2019, and the Müller Indoor Grand Prix has returned from Birmingham to Glasgow.

== Meetings ==
A seventh meeting was added in Liévin, France, with the tour was planned leading to the 2020 World Athletics Indoor Championships in Nanjing, China (postponed).

Meet	Stadium	City	Country	Date
New Balance Indoor Grand Prix	Reggie Lewis Track and Athletic Center	Boston	United States	25 January
Weltklasse in Karlsruhe	Dm-Arena	Karlsruhe	Germany	31 January
PSD Bank Meeting	Arena-Sportpark	Düsseldorf	Germany	4 February
Copernicus Cup	Toruń Arena	Toruń	Poland	8 February
Müller Indoor Grand Prix	Emirates Arena	Glasgow	United Kingdom	15 February
Meeting Hauts de France Pas de Calais	Arena Stade Couvert de Liévin	Liévin	France	19 February
Madrid Indoor	Gallur	Madrid	Spain	21 February

== Results ==
non World Indoor Tour events

=== Men's track ===
#	Meeting	60 m	400 m	800 m	1500 m	3000 m	60 m h
1	Boston	Demek Kemp (USA); 6.50	Obi Igbokwe (USA); 46.50; Donavan Brazier (USA); 1:14.39 (600m)	Bryce Hoppel (USA); 2:17.41 (1000m)	Chris O'Hare (GBR); 3:59.62 (Mile) AR	Bethwell Birgen (KEN); 7:44.21	-
2	Karlsruhe	-	-	Mostafa Smaili (MAR); 1:46.78	-	Bethwell Birgen (KEN); 7:38.50	-
3	Dusseldorf	Chijindu Ujah (GBR); 6.53	-	Marc Reuther (GER); 1:46.13	Filip Ingebrigtsen (NOR); 3:36.32	Selemon Barega (ETH); 7:35.71	Yaqoub Al-Youha (KUW); 7.54
4	Toruń	Ján Volko (SVK); 6.58	Yousef Karam (KUW); 46.26	Collins Kipruto (KEN); 1:45.86	Ignacio Fontes (ESP); 3:38.57	-	Andrew Pozzi (GBR); 7.53
5	Glasgow	Ronnie Baker (USA); 6.50	Akeem Bloomfield (JAM); 46.20	Adam Kszczot (POL); 1:46.34	Bethwell Birgen (KEN); 3:36.22	-	Andrew Pozzi (GBR); 7.57
6	Liévin	Ronnie Baker (USA); 6.44	-	Collins Kipruto (KEN); 1:46.34	Samuel Tefera (ETH); 3:35.54; Pierre-Ambroise Bosse (FRA); 2:19.26 (1000m)	Getnet Wale (ETH); 7:32.80	Pascal Martinot-Lagarde (FRA); 7.47
7	Madrid	Ronnie Baker (USA); 6.44	-	Collins Kipruto (KEN); 1:46.09	-	Getnet Wale (ETH); 7:39.96	Andrew Pozzi (GBR); 7.55
Overall		Ronnie Baker (USA)	-	Collins Kipruto (KEN)	-	Getnet Wale (ETH)	-

=== Men's field ===
#	Meeting	High jump	Long jump	Triple jump	Pole vault	Shot put
1	Boston	-	-	Pablo Torrijos (ESP); 26.75	-	-
2	Karlsruhe	-	Eusebio Cáceres (ESP); 7.99	-	Renaud Lavillenie (FRA); 5.70	-
3	Dusseldorf	-	-	-	Armand Duplantis (SWE); 6.00	Filip Mihaljević (CRO); 21.52
4	Toruń	-	-	-	Armand Duplantis (SWE); 6.17 WR	Tomáš Staněk (CZE); 21.86
5	Glasgow	-	-	-	Armand Duplantis (SWE); 6.18 WR	-
6	Liévin	-	-	Hugues Fabrice Zango (BUR); 17.51	Armand Duplantis (SWE); 6.07	-
7	Madrid	-	Juan Miguel Echevarría (CUB); 8.41	Hugues Fabrice Zango (BUR); 17.31	Konstantinos Filippidis (GRE); 5.60	Filip Mihaljević (CRO); 21.74
Overall		-	-	Hugues Fabrice Zango (BUR)	Armand Duplantis (SWE)	Filip Mihaljević (CRO)

=== Women's track ===
#	Meeting	60 m	400 m	800 m	1500 m	3000 m	60 m h
1	Boston	-	Gabrielle Thomas (USA); 36.52 (300m)	Lisanne de Witte (NED); 1:10.50 (500m)	Jessica Hull (AUS); 4:04.14 AR	Elinor Purrier (USA); 9:29.17 (2 Miles)	Nia Ali (USA); 7.94
2	Karlsruhe	Shania Collins (USA); 7.20	Ayomide Folorunso (ITA); 52.56	-	Axumawit Embaye (ETH); 4:07.94	Fantu Worku (ETH); 8:37.58	Tobi Amusan (NGR); 7.84
3	Dusseldorf	Gina Bass (GAM); 7.16	Lisanne de Witte (NED); 52.30	-	Beatrice Chepkoech (KEN); 4:02.09	-	Christina Clemons (USA); 7.91
4	Toruń	Shania Collins (USA); 7.24	Justyna Święty-Ersetic (POL); 51.37	-	Gudaf Tsegay (ETH); 4:00.09	-	Alina Talay (BLR); 7.87
5	Glasgow	Shelly-Ann Fraser-Pryce (JAM); 7.16	Jessie Knight (GBR); 51.57	Laura Muir (GBR); 2:33.47 (1000m)	Jemma Reekie (GBR); 4:04.07	-	Alina Talay (BLR); 8.03
6	Liévin	Gina Bass (GAM); 7.11	-	Jemma Reekie (GBR); 2:00.34	Gudaf Tsegay (ETH); 4:00.60	-	Nia Ali (USA); 7.92
7	Madrid	-	Justyna Święty-Ersetic (POL); 51.93	-	Gudaf Tsegay (ETH); 4:04.66	-	Christina Clemons (USA); 7.82
Overall		-	Justyna Święty-Ersetic (POL)	-	Gudaf Tsegay (ETH)	-	Christina Clemons (USA)

=== Women's field ===
#	Meeting	High jump	Long jump	Triple jump	Pole vault	Shot put
1	Boston	Amina Smith (USA); 1.89	-	-	-	-
2	Karlsruhe	Yaroslava Mahuchikh (UKR); 2.02 WJR, AJR	Maryna Bekh-Romanchuk (UKR); 6.92	-	-	-
3	Dusseldorf	-	-	Neele Eckhardt-Noack (GER); 14.17	-	-
4	Toruń	-	Maryna Bekh-Romanchuk (UKR); 6.96	-	-	-
5	Glasgow	Yaroslava Mahuchikh (UKR); 1.93	Maryna Bekh-Romanchuk (UKR); 6.90	-	-	-
6	Liévin	-	Maryna Bekh-Romanchuk (UKR); 6.90	-	Sandi Morris (USA); 4.83	-
7	Madrid	-	-	Yulimar Rojas (VEN); 15.43 WR, AR	-	-
Overall		Yaroslava Mahuchikh (UKR)	Maryna Bekh-Romanchuk (UKR)	-	-	-
