= 2022 World Athletics Indoor Tour =

Indoor track and field meetings

2022 IAAF World Indoor Tour
- Edition: 7th
- Dates: 22 January – 13 March
- Meetings: 36

The 2022 World Athletics Indoor Tour was the seventh edition of the World Athletics Indoor Tour, the highest series of international track and field indoor meetings.

The tour expanded in 2022 with the introduction of four tiers of competition labelled Gold, Silver, Bronze and Challenge in a mirror of the outdoor World Athletics Continental Tour comprising 36 meetings in Europe and North America. and retains seven gold standard events for 2022, five in Europe and two in the United States.

== Meetings ==
Meet	Stadium	City	Country	Date
2022 World Athletics Indoor Tour – Gold Meeting calendar
Millrose Games	Fort Washington Avenue Armory	New York City	United States	27–29 January
INIT INDOOR MEETING Karlsruhe	Dm-Arena	Karlsruhe	Germany	28 January
New Balance Indoor Grand Prix	Ocean Breeze Athletics Complex	New York City	United States	6 February
Meeting Hauts-de-France Pas-de-Calais	Arena Stade Couvert	Liévin	France	17 February
Müller Indoor Grand Prix	Arena Birmingham	Birmingham	United Kingdom	19 February
Orlen Copernicus Cup	Arena Toruń	Toruń	Poland	22 February
Villa de Madrid Indoor Meeting	Gallur Municipality Sport Complex	Madrid	Spain	2 March
2022 World Athletics Indoor Tour – Silver Meeting calendar
BoXX United Manchester World Indoor Tour	Manchester Arena	Manchester	United Kingdom	22 January
Hvězdy v Nehvizdech	Sportovní Hala	Nehvizdy	Czech Republic	30 January
Czech Indoor Gala	Atletická Hala	Ostrava	Czech Republic	3 February
ISTAF Indoor	Mercedes-Benz Arena	Berlin	Germany	4 February
Orlen Cup	Atlas Arena	Łódź	Poland	11 February
Meeting Metz Moselle Athlelor	L'Anneau-Halle d'athlétisme de Metz	Metz	France	12 February
Meeting de l'Eure Stade couvert	Stade couvert Jesse Owens	Val-de-Reuil	France	14 February
28. Banskobystricka latka	Športová hala Dukla	Banská Bystrica	Slovakia	15 February
All Star Perche by Quartus	Maison des Sports	Clermont-Ferrand	France	19 February
ISTAF Indoor Düsseldorf	ISS Dome	Düsseldorf	Germany	20 February
Perche Elite Tour	Complexe Kindarena	Rouen	France	5 March
Meeting de Paris Indoor	AccorHotels Arena de Bercy	Paris	France	6 March
Belgrade Indoor Meeting	Atletska dvorana	Belgrade	Serbia	7 March
2022 World Athletics Indoor Tour – Bronze Meeting calendar
Kladno Indoor	Atletická hala Sletiště	Kladno	Czech Republic	27 January
Meeting Elite de Miramas	Stadium Miramas Métropole	Miramas	France	4 February
Dr. Sander Invitational	Fort Washington Avenue Armory	New York City	United States	4–5 February
Dynamic New Athletics Indoor Match	Emirates Arena	Glasgow	United Kingdom	5 February
Hustopečské skákání	Městská sportovní hala	Hustopeče	Czech Republic	5 February
Mondeville Meeting	Halle Michel d'Ornano	Mondeville	France	9 February
American Track League	Norton Sports Center	Louisville	United States	12 February
PSD Bank Indoor Meeting	Helmut-Körnig-Halle	Dortmund	Germany	12 February
Chinese Indoor Tour Round 1	Sichuan Xipu Training Base	Chengdu	China	postponed
Chinese Indoor Tour Round 2	Sichuan Xipu Training Base	Chengdu	China	postponed
World Tune-Up – Adam Sanford Pro	Fort Washington Avenue Armory	New York	United States	6 March
2022 World Athletics Indoor Tour – Challenge Meeting calendar
RIG Games	Laugardalshöll	Reykjavík	Iceland	6 February
Beijer Pole Vault Gala	IFU Arena	Uppsala	Sweden	9 February
Nordic Indoor Match	IFU Arena	Uppsala	Sweden	13 February
Aarhus Sprint'n'Jump		Aarhus	Denmark	2 March

== Gold Tour Results ==
non World Indoor Tour events

=== Men's track ===
#	Meeting	60 m	400 m	800 m	1500 m	3000 m	60 m h
1	New York (Millrose)	Christian Coleman (USA); 6.49	Christopher Taylor (JAM); 46.38	Bryce Hoppel (USA); 1:46.05	Oliver Hoare (AUS); 3:50.83 (Mile) AR	George Beamish (NZL); 7:39.50	Devon Allen (USA); 7.51
2	Karlsruhe	–	-	Elliot Giles (GBR); 1:46.78	-	Berihu Aregawi (ETH); 7:26.20	Pascal Martinot-Lagarde (FRA); 7.54
3	New York (New Balance)	Noah Lyles (USA); 6.56	Jereem Richards (TTO); 45.83; Trayvon Bromell (USA); 20.64 (200m)	Mariano García (ESP); 1:45.12	Andrew Coscoran (IRE); 3:53.64 (Mile)	Adel Mechaal (ESP); 7:30.82 AR	Grant Holloway (USA); 7.37
4	Liévin	Marcell Jacobs (ITA); 6.50	-	Mariano García (ESP); 1:46.29	Jakob Ingebrigtsen (NOR); 3:30.60 WR, AR; Samuel Zeleke (ETH); 4:57.00 (2000m)	Lamecha Girma (ETH); 7:30.54	Grant Holloway (USA); 7.35
5	Birmingham	Noah Lyles (USA); 6.55	Kahmari Montgomery (USA); 45.72	Collins Kipruto (KEN); 1:45.39	Abel Kipsang (KEN); 3:34.57	-	Grant Holloway (USA); 7.41
6	Toruń	Elijah Hall (USA); 6.53	-	Elliot Giles (GBR); 1:46.78	-	Lamecha Girma (ETH); 7:31.09	Damian Czykier (POL); 7.48
7	Madrid	Elijah Hall (USA); 6.57	-	Elliot Giles (GBR); 1:45.43	-	Selemon Barega (ETH); 7:34.03	Asier Martínez (ESP); 7.56
Overall		Elijah Hall (USA)	-	Elliot Giles (GBR)	-	Lamecha Girma (ETH)	-

=== Men's field ===
#	Meeting	High jump	Long jump	Triple jump	Pole vault	Shot put
1	New York (Millrose)	-	-	-	-	Ryan Crouser (USA); 22.45
2	Karlsruhe	-	Thobias Montler (SWE); 8.02	Andreas Pantazis (GRE); 16.79	Armand Duplantis (SWE); 6.02	-
3	New York (New Balance)	-	-	Donald Scott (USA); 16.68	-	-
4	Liévin	-	-	Lázaro Martínez (CUB); 17.21	Christopher Nilsen (USA); 5.91	-
5	Birmingham	-	-	-	Armand Duplantis (SWE); 6.05	-
6	Toruń	-	-	-	Ernest John Obiena (PHI); 5.81	Filip Mihaljević (CRO); 21.84
7	Madrid	-	-	Lázaro Martínez (CUB); 17.12	-	Konrad Bukowiecki (POL); 21.91
Overall		-	-	Lázaro Martínez (CUB)	Armand Duplantis (SWE)	Konrad Bukowiecki (POL)

=== Women's track ===
#	Meeting	60 m	400 m	800 m	1500 m	3000 m	60 m h
1	New York (Millrose)	Aleia Hobbs (USA); 7.11	Wadeline Jonathas (USA); 52.51	Ajeé Wilson (USA); 2:01.38	Elinor Purrier St. Pierre (USA); 4:19.30 (Mile)	Alicia Monson (USA); 8:31.62	Britany Anderson (JAM); 7.91
2	Karlsruhe	María Isabel Pérez (ESP); 7.21	Anna Kiełbasińska (POL); 51.92	Halimah Nakaayi (UGA); 2:02.81	Axumawit Embaye (ETH); 4:02.12	-	Danielle Williams (JAM); 7.84
3	New York (New Balance)	Mikiah Brisco (USA); 7.07	Jessica Beard (USA); 52.88; Gabrielle Thomas (USA); 36.21 (300m)	Natoya Goule (JAM); 1:59.62	Esther Guerrero (ESP); 4:11.87	Gabriela DeBues-Stafford (CAN); 8:33.92	Danielle Williams (JAM); 7.83
4	Liévin	-	-	Natoya Goule (JAM); 1:58.46	Gudaf Tsegay (ETH); 4:21.72 (Mile)	Dawit Seyaum (ETH); 8:23.24	Laëticia Bapté (FRA); 8.00
5	Birmingham	Elaine Thompson-Herah (JAM); 7.08	Stephenie Ann McPherson (JAM); 51.39	Keely Hodgkinson (GBR); 1:57.20; Isabelle Boffey (GBR); 2:38.25 (1000m)	Dawit Seyaum (ETH); 4:04.35	-	Zoë Sedney (NED); 8.02
6	Toruń	Ewa Swoboda (POL); 7.03	Femke Bol (NED); 50.64	Catriona Bisset (AUS); 2:00.16	Gudaf Tsegay (ETH); 3:54.77	-	Devynne Charlton (BAH); 7.90
7	Madrid	-	Justyna Święty-Ersetic (POL); 51.21	Catriona Bisset (AUS); 2:00.10	Gudaf Tsegay (ETH); 3:57.38	-	Zoë Sedney (NED); 7.95
Overall		-	Justyna Święty-Ersetic (POL)	-	Gudaf Tsegay (ETH)	-	Devynne Charlton (BAH)

=== Women's field ===
#	Meeting	High jump	Long jump	Triple jump	Pole vault	Shot put
1	New York (Millrose)	-	Tara Davis (USA); 6.59	-	Sandi Morris (USA); 4.75	-
2	Karlsruhe	Emily Borthwick (GBR), Imke Onnen (GER); 1.91	-	-	-	-
3	New York (New Balance)	-	Lorraine Ugen (GBR); 6.71	-	-	-
4	Liévin	-	Yulimar Rojas (VEN); 6.81	-	Anzhelika Sidorova (ANA); 4.85	-
5	Birmingham	Eleanor Patterson (AUS); 1.97	Khaddi Sagnia (SWE); 6.70	-	-	-
6	Toruń	-	Khaddi Sagnia (SWE); 6.70	-	-	-
7	Madrid	Eleanor Patterson (AUS); 1.96	Lorraine Ugen (GBR); 6.67	Yulimar Rojas (VEN); 15.41	-	-
Overall		Eleanor Patterson (AUS)	Lorraine Ugen (GBR)	-	-	-
