= 2018 IAAF World Indoor Tour =

- Edition: 3rd
- Dates: 3 February - 25 February
- Meetings: 6
- Individual Prize Money (US$): US$ 20,000 per winner

The 2018 IAAF World Indoor Tour was the third edition of the IAAF World Indoor Tour, the highest series of international track and field indoor meetings. It was designed to create an IAAF Diamond League-style circuit for indoor track and field events, to raise the profile of indoor track and field athletics.

The Tour had six events for 2018, five in Europe and one in the United States, leading to the 2018 IAAF World Indoor Championships in Birmingham, United Kingdom. Winners of the Tour enjoyed similar privileges in relation to World Indoor Championships qualification as Diamond League winners do in relation to World Championships in Athletics. This was the first edition of the tour that featured the Madrid Indoor Meeting. The five 2017 meetings returned, although the Birmingham Indoor Grand Prix once more, as in 2016, moved to Glasgow as part of a long term deal, accommodating the hosting of the 2018 IAAF World Indoor Championships in Birmingham.

== Meetings ==
For the 2018 edition, the Meeting Madrid was added. In addition, as part of a long term agreement alternating venues of the Great Britain leg, the Birmingham Grand Prix moved to Glasgow, Scotland, facilitating the hosting of the 2018 IAAF World Indoor Championships in Birmingham.

Meet	Stadium	City	Country	Date
Weltklasse in Karlsruhe	Dm-Arena	Karlsruhe / Rheinstetten	Germany	3 February
PSD Bank Meeting	Arena Sportpark	Düsseldorf	Germany	6 February
Madrid Indoor	Gallur	Madrid	Spain	8 February
New Balance Indoor Grand Prix	Reggie Lewis Track and Athletic Center	Boston	United States	10 February
Copernicus Cup	Arena Toruń	Toruń	Poland	15 February
Glasgow Indoor Grand Prix	Emirates Arena	Glasgow	United Kingdom	25 February

== Scoring system ==
At each meeting a minimum of 12 events were staged. Included in the 12 events will be a core group of five or six events split across the two-season cycle.

Tour events for 2016 were the men’s 60m, 800m, 3000/5000m, pole vault, triple jump and shot put, plus the women’s 400m, 1500m, 60m hurdles, high jump and long jump.

Points were allocated to the best four athletes in each event, with the winner getting 10 points, the runner up receiving seven points, the third-placed finisher getting five points and the athlete in fourth receiving three points.

The individual overall winner of each event received US $20,000 in prize money and automatically qualified for the 2018 edition of the IAAF World Indoor Championships as a ‘wild card’ entry, provided the member federation of that World Indoor Tour winner agreed to enter the athlete.

Men

- 60 metres
- 800 metres
- 3000 metres
- Pole vault
- Triple jump
- Shot put

Women

- 400 metres
- 1500 metres
- 60 metre hurdles
- High jump
- Long jump

== Results ==
non World Indoor Tour events

=== Men's track ===
#	Meeting	60 m	400 m	800 m	1500 m	3000 m	60 m h
1	Karlsruhe	Bingtian Su (CHN); 6.47	-	Marcin Lewandowski (POL); 1:46.90	-	Hagos Gebrhiwet (ETH); 7:39.71	-
2	Dusseldorf	Bingtian Su (CHN); 6.43	-	Adam Kszczot (POL); 1:46.47	Vincent Kibet (KEN); 3:36.86	Yomif Kejelcha (ETH); 7:40.55	Balázs Baji (HUN); 7.64
3	Madrid	Mike Rodgers (USA); 6.63	Oscar Husillos (ESP); 45.86	Adam Kszczot (POL); 1:46.53	Ayanleh Souleiman (DJI); 3:38.47	-	-
4	Boston	Christian Coleman (USA); 6.46	Jereem Richards (TTO) (300 m)32.10 Deon Lendore (TTO); 46.25	Donavan Brazier (USA); 1:45.11	Chris O'Hare (GBR); 3:37.03	Edward Cheserek (KEN); 7:38.74	-
5	Torun	Jan Volko (SVK); 6.57	Luka Janezic (SLO); 46.03	Adam Kszczot (POL); 1:46.75	Taresa Tolosa (ETH); 3:37.41	-	Milan Trajkovic (CYP); 7.59
6	Glasgow	Bingtian Su (CHN); 6.50	Fred Kerley (USA); 45.86	Adam Kszczot (POL); 1:47.15	Bethwell Birgen (KEN); 3:37.76	Justus Kiplagat (KEN); 7:39.09; Tom Bosworth (GBR) (3000m walk) 10:30.28	Ronald Levy (JAM); 7.49
Overall		Bingtian Su (CHN)	-	Adam Kszczot (POL)	-	Yomif Kejelcha (ETH)	-

=== Men's field ===
#	Meeting	High jump	Long jump	Triple jump	Pole vault	Shot put
1	Karlsruhe	-	Juan Miguel Echevarría (CUB); 7.97		Raphael Holzdeppe (GER); 5.88	-
2	Dusseldorf	-	-	-	Piotr Lisek (POL); 5.86	Tomas Stanek (CZE); 22.17
3	Madrid	-	-	Almir dos Santos (BRA); 17.35	Konstadinos Filippidis (GRE); 5.85	Tomas Stanek (CZE); 21.69
4	Boston	-	-	Chris Carter (USA); 16.67	-	-
5	Torun	-	-	Cristian Napoles (CUB); 16.90	Piotr Lisek (POL); 5.91	Konrad Bukowiecki (POL); 22.00
6	Glasgow	-	Yuhao Shi (CHN); 8.13	-	-	-
Overall		-	-	Nelson Evora (POR)	Piotr Lisek (POL)	Tomas Stanek (CZE)

=== Women's track ===
#	Meeting	60 m	400 m	800 m	1500 m	3000 m	60 m h
1	Karlsruhe	Tatjana Pinto (GER); 7.10	Léa Sprunger (SUI); 52.03	-	Genzebe Dibaba (ETH); 3:57.45	-	Sharika Nelvis (USA); 7.80
2	Dusseldorf	Asha Philip (GBR); 7.17	-	-	Beatrice Chepkoech (KEN); 4:04.21	-	Christina Manning (USA); 7.77
3	Madrid	-	Léa Sprunger (SUI); 51.61	Esther Guerrero Puigdevall (ESP); 2:02.64	Genzebe Dibaba (ETH); 4:02.43	Meraf Bahta (SWE); 8:42.46	-
4	Boston	-	Shakima Wimbley (USA); 51.82	Jenna Westaway (CAN); 2:01.22	Dawit Seyaum (ETH); 4:04.38	Jennifer Simpson (USA); 8:40,31	Sharika Nelvis (USA); 7.89
5	Torun	Marie-Josée Ta Lou (CIV); 7.11	Léa Sprunger (SUI); 51.28	Angelika Cichocka (POL); 2:00.76	Rababe Arafi (MAR); 4:04.76	-	Pamela Dutkiewicz (GER); 7.85
6	Glasgow	Marie-Josée Ta Lou (CIV); 7.07	Phyllis Francis (USA); 52.00	Liga Velvere (LAT); 2:02.01	Beatrice Chepkoech (KEN); 4:02.21	-	Christina Manning (USA); 7.79
Overall		-	Léa Sprunger (SUI)	-	Genzebe Dibaba (ETH)	-	Sharika Nelvis (USA); Christina Manning (USA)

=== Women's field ===
#	Meeting	High jump	Long jump	Triple jump	Pole vault	Shot put
1	Karlsruhe	Mirela Demireva (BUL); 1.95	Malaika Mihambo (GER); 6.72	-	-	-
2	Dusseldorf	-	Ivana Spanovic (SRB); 6.77	-	-	-
3	Madrid	Mariya Lasitskene (ANA); 2.00	-	Viktoriya Prokopenko (ANA); 14.31	-	-
4	Boston	Erika Kinsey (SWE); 1.91	-	-	-	-
5	Torun	Mariya Lasitskene (ANA); 2.00	-	-	-	-
6	Glasgow	Mariya Lasitskene (ANA); 1.95	Khaddi Sagnia (SWE); 6.92	-	Ekaterina Stefanidi (GRE); 4.75	-
Overall		Mariya Lasitskene (ANA)	Sosthene Moguenara-Taroum (GER)	-	-	-

== Final 2018 World Indoor Tour standings ==
=== Men ===
60 m		800 m		3000m		Triple jump		Pole vault		Shot put	
Bingtian Su (CHN)	30	Adam Kszczot (POL)	30	Yomif Kejelcha (ETH)	22	Nelson Évora (POR)	12	Piotr Lisek (POL)	27	Tomas Stanek (CZE)	27
Mike Rodgers (USA)	22	Marcin Lewandowski (POL)	17	Hagos Gebrhiwet (ETH)	17	4 athletes	10	Konstadínos Filippídis (GRE)	20	Konrad Bukowiecki (POL)	15
Yunier Pérez (CUB)	12	Nicholas Kipkoech (KEN)	14	Adel Mechaal (ESP)	11	4 athletes	10	Paweł Wojciechowski (POL)	15	2 athletes.	12

=== Women ===
400 m		1500		60m hurdles		High jump		Long jump	
Léa Sprunger (SUI)	30	Beatrice Chepkoech (KEN)	25	Christina Manning (USA) Sharika Nelvis (USA)	27	Mariya Lasitskene (ANA)	30	Sosthene Moguenara-Taroum (GER)	21
Phyllis Francis (USA)	17	Genzebe Dibaba (ETH)	20	Christina Manning (USA) Sharika Nelvis (USA)	27	Erika Kinsey (SWE)	18	Ivana Spanovic (SRB)	20
Anita Horvat (SLO)	14	Konstanze Klosterhalfen (GER)	14	Pamela Dutkiewicz (GER)	15	Yuliya Levchenko (UKR)	14	2 athletes.	10
