= 2019 IAAF World Indoor Tour =

- Edition: 4th
- Dates: 26 January - 20 February
- Meetings: 6
- Individual Prize Money (US$): US$ 20,000 per winner

The 2019 IAAF World Indoor Tour was the fourth edition of the IAAF World Indoor Tour, the highest series of international track and field indoor meetings. It was designed to create an IAAF Diamond League-style circuit for indoor track and field events, to raise the profile of indoor track and field athletics.

The Tour retains six events for 2019, five in Europe and one in the United States. All six 2018 meetings returned, although the order of the meetings has been rearranged from 2018, and the Birmingham Indoor Grand Prix has returned from Glasgow to Birmingham as part of a long term deal, having hosted the 2018 IAAF World Indoor Championships. Glasgow, in turn, will host the 2019 European Athletics Indoor Championships at the end of the indoor season, from 1–3 March 2019.

== Meetings ==
Continuing the long term agreement alternating venues of the Great Britain leg, the Glasgow Grand Prix returns to Birmingham, England, accommodating in this case the holding of the 2019 European Athletics Indoor Championships in Glasgow, Scotland.

Meet	Stadium	City	Country	Date
New Balance Indoor Grand Prix	Reggie Lewis Track and Athletic Center	Boston	United States	26 January
Weltklasse in Karlsruhe	Dm-Arena	Karlsruhe	Germany	2 February
Copernicus Cup	Toruń Arena	Toruń	Poland	6 February
Madrid Indoor	Gallur	Madrid	Spain	8 February
Müller Indoor Grand Prix Birmingham	Barclaycard Arena	Birmingham	United Kingdom	16 February
PSD Bank Meeting	Arena-Sportpark	Düsseldorf	Germany	20 February

== Scoring system ==
At each meeting a minimum of 12 events were staged. Included in the 12 events will be a core group of five or six events split across the two-season cycle.

Tour counting events for 2019 were the men’s 60m, hurdles 400m, 1500m, high jump and long jump, plus the women’s 60m, 800m, 3,000/5,000m, pole vault, triple jump and shot put.

Points were allocated to the best four athletes in each event, with the winner getting 10 points, the runner up receiving seven points, the third-placed finisher getting five points and the athlete in fourth receiving three points. There is a bonus 3 points awarded to any athlete who set a world record.

The individual overall winner of each event received US $20,000 in prize money. In each event the finishing positions offered the following money: 1st: $3000. 2nd: $1500. 3rd: $1000. 4th: $750. 5th: $500. 6th: $300. For middle distance races, $200 and $150 will be awarded to 7th and 8th place. All tour winners qualify for the 2020 IAAF World Indoor Championships, taking a wildcard spot subject to ratification by their country.

=== Indoor Tour Events ===
The following events are core Tour events for the 2019 indoor season:

Men

- 400 metres
- 1500 metres
- 60 metre hurdles
- High jump
- Long jump

Women

- 60 metres
- 800 metres
- 3000 metres
- Pole vault
- Triple jump
- Shot put

== Results ==
non World Indoor Tour events

=== Men's track ===
#	Meeting	60 m	400 m	800 m	1500 m	3000 m	60 m h
1	Boston	-	Nathan Strother (USA); 46.97	Donavan Brazier (USA); 1:45.91	Yomif Kejelcha (ETH); 3:51.70 (mile)	Hagos Gebrhiwet (ETH); 7:37.41	Jarret Eaton (USA); 7.64
2	Karlsruhe	-	Pavel Maslak (CZE); 46.78	Andreas Kramer (SWE); 1:46.52	Vincent Kibet (KEN); 3:38.23	-	-
3	Toruń	-	Pavel Maslak (CZE); 46.19	Erik Sowinski (USA); 1:47.49	Samuel Tefera (ETH); 3:35.57	-	Orlando Ortega (ESP); 7.49
4	Madrid	Michael Rodgers (USA); 6.57	Nathan Strother (USA); 46.21	Cornelius Tuwei (KEN); 1:47.76	Bethwell Birgen (KEN); 3:40.17	-	Jarret Eaton (USA); 7.56
5	Birmingham	Su Bingtian (CHN); 6.47	Nathan Strother (USA); 46.45	Joseph Deng (AUS); 1:47.27	Samuel Tefera (ETH); 3:31.04	-	Jarret Eaton (USA); 7.51
6	Dusseldorf	Su Bingtian (CHN); 6.49	Nathan Strother (USA); 46.48	Álvaro De Arriba (SPA); 1:46.63	Jakob Ingebrigtsen (NOR); 3:36.02	-	Orlando Ortega (SPA); 7.52
Overall		-	Nathan Strother (USA)	-	Samuel Tefera (ETH)	-	Jarret Eaton (USA)

=== Men's field ===
#	Meeting	High jump	Long jump	Triple jump	Pole vault	Shot put
1	Boston	-	-	-	-	-
2	Karlsruhe	Naoto Tobe (JPN); 2.35	Thobias Nilsson Montler (SWE); 8.08	-	-	-
3	Toruń	Ilya Ivanyuk (ANA); 2.25	Juan Miguel Echevarria (CUB); 8.12	-	Sam Kendricks (USA); 5.78	-
4	Madrid	-	Miltiadis Tentoglou (GRE); 8.23	-	-	David Storl (GER); 21.01
5	Birmingham	Naoto Tobe (JPN); 2.29	Juan Miguel Echevarria (CUB); 8.21	-	-	-
6	Dusseldorf	Naoto Tobe (JPN); 2.34	-	-	-	-
Overall		Naoto Tobe (JPN)	Juan Miguel Echevarria (CUB)	-	-	-

=== Women's track ===
#	Meeting	60 m	400 m	800 m	1500 m	3000 m	60 m h
1	Boston	Michelle-Lee Ahye (TTO); 7.21	Kendall Ellis (USA); 36.97 (300m)	Raevyn Rogers (USA); 1:27.31 (600m)	Gabriela Stafford (CAN); 4:24.80 (mile)	Konstanze Klosterhalfen (GER); 15:15.80 (5000m)	-
2	Karlsruhe	Ewa Swoboda (POL); 7.10	-	-	-	Melissa Courtney (GBR); 8:43.36	Nadine Visser (NED); 7.97
3	Toruń	Ewa Swoboda (POL); 7.15	-	Habitam Alemu (ETH); 1:59.49	-	-	Pamela Dutkiewicz (GER); 7.95
4	Madrid	Ewa Swoboda (POL); 7.11	-	-	Sofia Ennaoui (POL); 4:08.31	Alemaz Samuel (ETH); 8:43.76	-
5	Birmingham	Elaine Thompson (JAM); 7.13	Stephanie Ann McPherson (JAM); 52.24	Shelayna Oskan-Clarke (GBR); 2:01.16	Laura Muir (GBR); 4:18.75 (mile)	Alemaz Samuel (ETH); 8:54.60	Evonne Britton (USA); 7.91
6	Dusseldorf	Marie-Josée Ta Lou (CIV); 7.02	Lena Naumann (GER); 54.61	Habitam Alemu (ETH); 2:00.70	-	-	-
Overall		Ewa Swoboda (POL)	-	Habitam Alemu (ETH)	-	Alemaz Samuel (ETH)	-

=== Women's field ===
#	Meeting	High jump	Long jump	Triple jump	Pole vault	Shot put
1	Boston	-	-	-	Katie Nageotte (USA); 4.86	Maggie Ewen (USA); 19.28
2	Karlsruhe	-	-	Ana Peleteiro (ESP); 14.51	Alysha Newman (CAN); Ekaterini Stefanidi (GRE); Anzhelika Sidorova (ANA); 4.71	-
3	Toruń	-	-	-	-	Christina Schwanitz (GER); 18.97
4	Madrid	-	-	Yulimar Rojas (VEN); 14.92	Anzhelika Sidorova (ANA); 4.91	-
5	Birmingham	-	Ivana Spanovic (SRB); 6.78	-	Holly Bradshaw (GBR); 4.81	-
6	Dusseldorf	-	-	Yulimar Rojas (VEN); 14.46	Anzhelika Sidorova (ANA); 4.77	Christina Schwanitz (GER); 19.14
Overall		-	-	Yulimar Rojas (VEN)	Anzhelika Sidorova (ANA)	Christina Schwanitz (GER)

== Final 2019 World Indoor Tour standings ==
=== Men ===
400 m		1500		60m hurdles		High jump		Long jump	
Nathan Strother (USA)	30	Samuel Tefera (ETH)	30	Jarret Eaton (USA)	30	Naoto Tobe (JPN)	30	Juan Miguel Echevarría (CUB)	27
Pavel Maslák (CZE)	27	Bethwell Birgen (KEN)	24	Orlando Ortega (ESP)	27	Yu Wang (CHN)	14	Thobias Montler (SWE)	20
Luka Janežič (SLO)	19	Yomif Kejelcha (ETH)	17	Milan Trajkovic (CYP)	21	2 athletes.	10	Miltiadis Tentoglou (GRE)	15

=== Women ===
60 m		800 m		3000m		Pole vault		Triple jump		Shot put	
Ewa Swoboda (POL)	30	Habitam Alemu (ETH)	20	Alemaz Samuel (ETH)	27	Anzhelika Sidorova (ANA)	30	Yulimar Rojas (VEN)	27	Christina Schwanitz (GER)	27
Marie-Josée Ta Lou (CIV)	22	Shelayna Oskan-Clarke (GBR)	17	Melissa Courtney-Bryant (GBR); Konstanze Klosterhalfen (GER)	10	Katerina Stefanidi (GRE)	22	Patrícia Mamona (POR)	17	3 athletes	10
Dafne Schippers (NED)	19	2 athletes.	10	Melissa Courtney-Bryant (GBR); Konstanze Klosterhalfen (GER)	10	Katie Nageotte (USA)	20	Ana Peleteiro (ESP)	10	3 athletes	10
