= 2017 IAAF World Indoor Tour =

- Edition: 2nd
- Dates: 28 January – 18 February
- Meetings: 5
- Individual Prize Money (US$): US$ 20,000 per winner

The 2017 IAAF World Indoor Tour was the second edition of the IAAF World Indoor Tour, the highest level of annual series of track and field indoor meetings. It was designed to create an IAAF Diamond League-style circuit for indoor track and field events, to raise the profile of indoor track and field athletics.

Announced with initially four events for 2016, three in Europe and one in the United States, leading to the 2016 IAAF World Indoor Championships in Portland, Oregon, the second edition contained 5 meetings, and took place in a year with no World Indoor championships; therefore qualification places were not applicable. The Globen Galan was removed from this year's series, and the Stockholm leg was replaced by the International Copernicus Cup, a long-standing indoor event in Torún, Poland for 2017. The PSD Bank Meeting in Düsseldorf was also added, while the Birmingham Indoor Grand Prix returned to its traditional home, having been in Glasgow in 2016.

== Meetings ==
For the 2017 edition, the Stockholm meeting was removed, and two further meetings added. In addition, as part of a long-term agreement alternating venues of the Great Britain leg, the Glasgow Indoor Grand Prix moved to Birmingham, England.

Meet	Stadium	City	Country	Date
New Balance Indoor Grand Prix	Reggie Lewis Track and Athletic Center	Boston	United States	28 January
PSD Bank Meeting	Arena Sportpark	Düsseldorf	Germany	1 February
Weltklasse in Karlsruhe	Dm-Arena	Karlsruhe / Rheinstetten	Germany	4 February
Copernicus Cup	Arena Toruń	Toruń	Poland	10 February
Birmingham Indoor Grand Prix	Barclaycard Arena	Birmingham	United Kingdom	18 February

== Scoring system ==
At each meeting a minimum of 12 events were staged. Included in the 12 events will be a core group of five or six events split across the two-season cycle.

Tour events for 2016 were the men's 60m, 800m, 3000/5000m, pole vault, triple jump and shot put, plus the women's 400m, 1500m, 60m hurdles, high jump and long jump.

Points were allocated to the best four athletes in each event, with the winner getting 10 points, the runner up receiving seven points, the third-placed finisher getting five points and the athlete in fourth receiving three points.

The individual overall winner of each event received US$20,000 in prize money.

=== Indoor Tour Events ===
The following events were core Tour events for the 2017 indoor season:

Men

- 400 metres
- 1500 metres
- 60 metre hurdles
- High jump
- Long jump

Women

- 60 metres
- 800 metres
- 3000 metres
- Pole vault
- Triple jump
- Shot put

== Results ==
non World Indoor Tour events.

=== Men's track ===
#	Meeting	60 m	400 m	800 m	1500 m	3000 m	60 m h
1	Boston	Harry Aikines-Aryeetey (GBR); 6.66	Noah Lyles (USA) (200 m) 32.67	Donavan Brazier (USA) (600 m) 1:16.57	Matt Centrowitz (USA) (Mile) 3:55.78	Paul Chelimo (USA); 7:42.39	-
2	Düsseldorf	Yunier Pérez (CUB); 6.56	Pavel Maslák (CZE); 46.00	Adam Kszczot (POL); 1:46.17	Elijah Manangoi (KEN); 3:37.62	Hillary Ngetich (KEN); 7:44.73	Orlando Ortega (ESP); 7.51
3	Karlsruhe	-	-	Erik Sowinski (USA); 1:46.80	Silas Kiplagat (ESP); 3:38.51	-	Andrew Pozzi (GBR); 7.44
4	Toruń	Ronnie Baker (USA); 6.46	Bralon Taplin (GRN); 45.59	Nicholas Kipkoech (KEN); 1:46.34	Bethwell Birgen (KEN); 3:37.63	-	Orlando Ortega (ESP); 7.48
5	Birmingham	Ronnie Baker (USA); 6.55	Pavel Maslák (CZE); 45.89	Casimir Loxsom (USA); 1:46.13	Ben Blankenship (USA); 3:36.42	Mo Farah (GBR) (5000 m) 13:09.16	Andrew Pozzi (GBR); 7.43
Overall		-	Pavel Maslák (CZE)	-	Bethwell Birgen (KEN)	-	Orlando Ortega (ESP)

=== Men's field ===
#	Meeting	High jump	Long jump	Triple jump	Pole vault	Shot put
1	Boston	Donald Thomas (BAH); 2.28	Fabrice Lapierre (AUS); 7.80	-	-	-
2	Düsseldorf			-	-	-
3	Karlsruhe	Pavel Seliverstau (BLR); 2:30	Godfrey Mokoena (RSA); 8.05	-	-	-
4	Toruń	Sylwester Bednarek (POL); 2:27	-	-	-	-
5	Birmingham	Erik Kynard (USA); 2.31	Godfrey Mokoena (RSA); 7.99	-	-	-
Overall		Donald Thomas (BAH)	Godfrey Mokoena (RSA)	-	-	-

=== Women's track ===
#	Meeting	60 m	400 m	800 m	1500 m	3000 m	60 m h
1	Boston	English Gardner (USA); 7.17	Courtney Okolo (USA) (300 m) 36.87	Charlene Lipsey (USA); 2:02.01	-	Hellen Obiri (KEN); 8:39.08	-
2	Düsseldorf	Olesya Povkh (UKR); 7.16	-	Joanna Jóźwik (POL); 2:00.91	-	-	Cindy Roleder (GER); 7.95
3	Karlsruhe	Gayon Evans (JAM); 7.14	-	Lucia Arens (GER); 2:19.99	-	Laura Muir (GBR); 8:26.41	Kendra Harrison (USA); 7.76
4	Toruń	Barbara Pierre (USA); 7.13	Iga Baumgart (POL); 52.17	Joanna Jóźwik (POL); 1:59.29	Genzebe Dibaba (ETH); 3:58.80	-	Andrea Ivancevic (CRO); 7:96
5	Birmingham	Elaine Thompson (JAM); 6.98	Zuzana Hejnová (CZE); 51.77	Joanna Jóźwik (POL); 2:01.12	Laura Muir (GBR) (1000m) 2:31.93	Hellen Obiri (KEN); 8:29.41	Christina Manning (USA); 7.83
Overall		Gayon Evans (JAM)	-	Joanna Jóźwik (POL)	-	Hellen Obiri (KEN)	-

=== Women's field ===
#	Meeting	High jump	Long jump	Triple jump	Pole vault	Shot put
1	Boston	-	-	Patrícia Mamona (POR); 14.01	Katerina Stefanidi (GRE); 4.63	-
2	Düsseldorf	-	-	Patrícia Mamona (POR); 14.11	Sandi Morris (USA); 4.72	Anita Márton (HUN); 18.17
3	Karlsruhe	-	-	-	Lisa Ryzih (GER); 4.67	Christina Schwanitz (GER); 18.41
4	Toruń	-	-	Anna Jagaciak (POL); 13.97	Nicole Büchler (SUI); 4.60	-
5	Birmingham	-	Lorraine Ugen (GBR); 6.76	-	Ekaterini Stefanidi (GRE); 4:63	Anita Márton (HUN); 18.97
Overall		-	-	Patrícia Mamona (POR)	Nicole Büchler (SUI)	Anita Márton (HUN)

== Final 2017 World Indoor Tour standings ==
=== Men ===
400 m		1500		60m hurdles		High jump		Long jump	
Pavel Maslák (CZE)	27	Bethwell Birgen (KEN)	22	Orlando Ortega (ESP)	27	Donald Thomas (BAH)	15	Godfrey Mokoena (RSA)	20
Bralon Taplin (GRN)	20	Silas Kiplagat (KEN)	20	Andrew Pozzi (GBR)	20	4 athletes	7	Fabrice Lapierre (AUS)	15
Luguelín Santos (DOM)	15	Elijah Manangoi (KEN)	17	3 athletes	7	4 athletes	7	3 athletes.	7

=== Women ===
60 m		800 m		3000m		Pole vault		Triple jump		Shot put	
Gayon Evans (JAM)	22	Joanna Jóźwik (POL)	30	Hellen Obiri (KEN)	27	Nicole Büchler (SUI)	24	Patrícia Mamona (POR)	20	Anita Márton (HUN)	27
Barbara Pierre (USA)	20	Selina Büchel (SUI)	14	Sifan Hassan (NED)	14	Katerina Stefanidi (GRE)	20	Nadia Eke (GHA)	14	Christina Schwanitz (GER)	17
Ezinne Okparaebo (NOR)	12	Marina Arzamasova (BLR)	13	Laura Muir (GBR)	10	Mary Saxer (USA)	17	Anna Jagaciak (POL)	10	Melissa Boekelman (NED)	13
