= World Athletics Indoor Tour =

Indoor track and field competition

- Most recent season or competition: 2026 World Athletics Indoor Tour
- Sport: Athletics
- Founded: 2016
- Continent: Africa, Asia, Australia, Europe, North America, South America

The World Athletics Indoor Tour, formerly the IAAF World Indoor Tour, is an annual series of indoor track and field meetings, held since 2016. It was designed to create a Diamond League-style circuit for indoor track and field events, to raise the profile of indoor track and field, and replaced the IAAF Indoor Permit Meetings series.

The tour was announced with initially four meetings, three in Europe and one in the United States, leading to the 2016 IAAF World Indoor Championships in Portland, Oregon. Winners of the Tour enjoy similar privileges in relation to World Indoor Championships qualification as Diamond League winners do in relation to the World Athletics Championships. The tour was initially in place for two years.

The Düsseldorf leg was added for the 2017 Tour, and the Stockholm leg was replaced by the International Copernicus Cup, a long-standing indoor event in Toruń, Poland. In 2018, the tour became a permanent fixture, and the Meeting Ville de Madrid was added as the sixth event on the tour. For 2020, the tour added a seventh leg in Liévin, France.

In 2021, the tour expanded by introducing three levels of competition: Gold, Silver and Bronze, mirroring the expanded outdoor World Athletics Continental Tour. In 2022, the tour expanded with the fourth tier: Challenger.

The tour is organised to allow for major indoor championships including the World Athletics Indoor Championships and the European Athletics Indoor Championships and, where appropriate, national championships and trials.

== Editions ==
Edition	Year	Meets	Start date	End date
1	2016	4	6 February	20 February
2	2017	5	28 January	18 February
3	2018	6	3 February	25 February
4	2019	6	26 January	20 February
5	2020	7	25 January	21 February
6	2021	25	24 January	27 February
7	2022	36	22 January	13 March
8	2023	54	21 January	11 March
9	2024	54	29 December	24 February
10	2025	54	11 January	1 March
11	2026	78	13 December	12 March
12	2027	75	5 December	13 March

== (Gold Standard) Meetings ==
In keeping with the indoor season generally, the season for the World Athletics Indoor Tour is considerably shorter than for the outdoor Diamond League, with the tour concluded in little over a month, and meetings often held only a few days apart. The meeting in Boston is the ever-present in the history of the tour. The most recent expansion is the Belgrade Indoor Meeting, added for the first time in 2025. Typically, major international championship events take place after the conclusion of the tour season.

#	Meeting	Arena	City	Country	2016	2017	2018	2019	2020	2021	2022	2023	2024	2025	2026	2027
12	New Balance Indoor Grand Prix	Reggie Lewis Track and Athletic Center / Ocean Breeze Athletic Complex	Boston / New York City	United States	•	•	•	•	•	•	•	•	•	•	•	•
11	Copernicus Cup	Arena Toruń	Toruń	Poland	–	•	•	•	•	•	•	•	•	•	•	•
11	Indoor Meeting Karlsruhe	Dm-Arena	Karlsruhe	Germany	•	•	•	•	•	•	•	•	–	•	•	•
10	Villa de Madrid Indoor Meeting	Gallur Municipality Sport Complex	Madrid	Spain	–	–	•	•	•	•	•	•	•	•	•	•
8	Meeting Hauts de France Pas de Calais	Arena Stade Couvert de Liévin	Liévin	France	–	–	–	–	•	•	•	•	•	•	•	•
7	Müller Indoor Grand Prix	Commonwealth Arena / Utilita Arena Birmingham	Glasgow / Birmingham	Great Britain	•	•	•	•	•	–	•	•	–	–	–	–
6	Millrose Games	Fort Washington Avenue Armory	New York City	United States	–	–	–	–	–	–	•	•	•	•	•	•
4	PSD Bank Meeting	Arena-Sportpark	Düsseldorf	Germany	–	•	•	•	•	–	–	–	–	–	–	–
4	Czech Indoor Gala	Ostravar Aréna	Ostrava	Czech Republic	–	–	–	–	–	–	–	–	•	•	•	•
3	Belgrade Indoor Meeting	Atletska dvorana Beograd	Belgrade	Serbia	–	–	–	–	–	–	–	–	–	•	•	•
2	Astana Indoor Meet for Amin Tuyakov Prizes	Qazaqstan Indoor Track and Field Arena	Astana	Kazakhstan	–	–	–	–	–	–	–	–	•	•	–	–
1	Globen Galan	Ericsson Globe	Stockholm	Sweden	•	–	–	–	–	–	–	–	–	–	–	–
1	Banskobystricka latka	Stiavnicky Sport Hall	Banská Bystrica	Slovakia	–	–	–	–	–	•	–	–	–	–	–	–

== Scoring system ==
At each meeting a minimum of 12 events are to be staged. Included in the 12 events will be a core group of five or six events split across the two-season cycle.

For example: tour events for 2016 and 2018 were the men's 60m, 800m, 3000/5000m, pole vault, triple jump and shot put, plus the women's 400m, 1500m, 60m hurdles, high jump and long jump.

In 2017 and 2019 the tour events were the women's 60m, 800m, 3000/5000m, pole vault, triple jump and shot put, as well as the men's 400m, 1500m, 60m hurdles, high jump and long jump.

Points will be allocated to the best four athletes in each event, with the winner getting 10 points, the runner up receiving seven points, the third-placed finisher getting five points and the athlete in fourth receiving three points. Only each athlete's best three results in the tour per event group will count for scoring.

The individual overall winner of each event will receive US$20,000 in prize money and, beginning with the 2016 edition in Portland, will automatically qualify for the next edition of the World Athletics Indoor Championships as a ‘wild card’ entry, provided the member federation of that World Indoor Tour winner agrees to enter the athlete. The individual overall winner of each event received a US$10,000 bonus in 2021.

== Current meetings ==
=== 2027 ===
Date	Meeting	Venue	Country
Gold Level Meetings (8)
27 Jan	Belgrade Indoor Meeting	Belgrade	Serbia
2 Feb	Czech Indoor Gala	Ostrava	Czech Republic
4 Feb	World Indoor Tour Gold Madrid	Madrid	Spain
6 Feb	New Balance Indoor Grand Prix	Boston	United States
7 Feb	INIT Meeting Karlsruhe	Karlsruhe	Germany
10 Feb	Meeting Hauts-de-France Pas-de-Calais "Trophée EDF"	Liévin	France
11–13 Feb	Millrose Games	New York City	United States
14 Feb	ORLEN Copernicus Cup	Toruń	Poland

== Winners ==
The following table sets out the overall winners of World Indoor Tour disciplines in each year of the Tour.

=== Men's track ===
Year	60 m	400 m	800 m	1500 m	3000 m	60 m h
2016	Michael Rodgers (USA)	–	Adam Kszczot (POL)	–	Augustine Kiprono Choge (KEN)	–
2017	–	Pavel Maslák (CZE)	–	Bethwell Kiprotich Birgen (KEN)	–	Orlando Ortega (ESP)
2018	Su Bingtian (CHN)	–	Adam Kszczot (POL)	–	Yomif Kejelcha (ETH)	–
2019	–	Nathan Strother (USA)	–	Samuel Tefera (ETH)	–	Jarret Eaton (USA)
2020	Ronnie Baker (USA)	–	Collins Kipruto (KEN)	–	Getnet Wale (ETH)	–
2021	–	Pavel Maslák (CZE)	–	Selemon Barega (ETH)	–	Grant Holloway (USA)
2022	Elijah Hall (USA)	–	Elliot Giles (GBR)	–	Lamecha Girma (ETH)	–
2023	–	Jereem Richards (TRI)	–	Neil Gourley (GBR)	–	Grant Holloway (USA)
2024	Jeremiah Azu (GBR)	–	Catalin Tecuceanu (ITA)	–	Selemon Barega (ETH)	–
2025	–	Brian Faust (USA)	–	Samuel Pihlström (SWE)	–	Wilhem Belocian (FRA)
2026	Ackeem Blake (JAM)	–	Eliott Crestan (BEL)	–	Tshepo Tshite (RSA)	–

=== Men's field ===
Year	Long jump	Triple jump	High jump	Pole vault	Shot put
2016	–	Omar Craddock (USA)	–	Shawnacy Barber (CAN)	Tim Nedow (CAN)
2017	Godfrey Khotso Mokoena (RSA)	–	Donald Thomas (BAH)	–	–
2018	–	Nelson Évora (POR)	–	Piotr Lisek (POL)	Tomáš Staněk (CZE)
2019	Juan Miguel Echevarria (CUB)	–	Naoto Tobe (JPN)	–	–
2020	–	Hugues Fabrice Zango (BUR)	–	Armand Duplantis (SWE)	Filip Mihaljevic (CRO)
2021	Juan Miguel Echevarria (CUB)	–	Gianmarco Tamberi (ITA)	–	–
2022	–	Lázaro Martínez (CUB)	–	Armand Duplantis (SWE)	Konrad Bukowiecki (POL)
2023	Thobias Montler (SWE)	–	Hamish Kerr (NZL)	–	–
2024	–	Yasser Triki (ALG)	–	Piotr Lisek (POL)	Tom Walsh (NZL)
2025	Mattia Furlani (ITA)	–	Luis Castro Rivera (PUR)	–	–
2026	–	Yasser Triki (ALG)	–	Sondre Guttormsen (NOR)	Jordan Geist (USA)

=== Women's track ===
Year	60 m	400 m	800 m	1500 m	3000 m	60 m h
2016	–	Lisanne de Witte (NED)	–	Axumawit Embaye (ETH)	–	Nia Ali (USA)
2017	Gayon Evans (JAM)	–	Joanna Jozwik (POL)	–	Hellen Onsando Obiri (KEN)	–
2018	–	Léa Sprunger (SUI)	–	Genzebe Dibaba (ETH)	–	Christina Manning (USA)
2019	Ewa Swoboda (POL)	–	Habitam Alemu (ETH)	–	Alemaz Samuel (ETH)	–
2020	–	Justyna Święty-Ersetic (POL)	–	Gudaf Tsegay (ETH)	–	Christina Clemons (USA)
2021	Javianne Oliver (USA)	–	Habitam Alemu (ETH)	–	Lemlem Hailu (ETH)	–
2022	–	Justyna Święty-Ersetic (POL)	–	Gudaf Tsegay (ETH)	–	Devynne Charlton (BAH)
2023	Aleia Hobbs (USA)	–	Keely Hodgkinson (GBR)	–	Lemlem Hailu (ETH)	–
2024	–	Lieke Klaver (NED)	–	Freweyni Hailu (ETH)	–	Devynne Charlton (BAH)
2025	Patrizia van der Weken (LUX)	–	Tsige Duguma (ETH)	–	Freweyni Hailu (ETH)	–
2026	–	Lieke Klaver (NED)	–	Birke Haylom (ETH)	–	Devynne Charlton (BAH)

=== Women's field ===
Year	Long jump	Triple jump	High jump	Pole vault	Shot put
2016	Lorraine Ugen (GBR)	–	Marie-Laurence Jungfleisch (GER)	–	–
2017	–	Patrícia Mamona (POR)	–	Nicole Büchler (SUI)	Anita Márton (HUN)
2018	Sosthene Moguenara-Taroum (GER)	–	Mariya Lasitskene (ANA)	–	–
2019	–	Yulimar Rojas (VEN)	–	Anzhelika Sidorova (ANA)	Christina Schwanitz (GER)
2020	Maryna Bekh-Romanchuk (UKR)	–	Yaroslava Mahuchikh (UKR)	–	–
2021	–	Liadagmis Povea (CUB)	–	Iryna Zhuk (BLR)	Auriol Dongmo (POR)
2022	Lorraine Ugen (GBR)	–	Eleanor Patterson (AUS)	–	–
2023	–	Liadagmis Povea (CUB)	–	Alysha Newman (CAN)	Sarah Mitton (CAN)
2024	Milica Gardašević (SRB)	–	Urtė Baikštytė (LIT)	–	–
2025	–	Leyanis Pérez Hernández (CUB)	–	Molly Caudery (GBR)	Chase Jackson (USA)
2026	Larissa Iapichino (ITA)	–	Maria Żodzik (POL)	–	–

== World Athletics Indoor Tour records ==
The following tour records are correct as of the end of the 2026 World Athletics Indoor Tour.

Men's Indoor Tour records
Event	Record	Athlete	Nationality	Date	Meet	Place	Ref.
60 m	6.43	Bingtian Su	China	6 February 2018	PSD Bank Meeting	Düsseldorf	
400 m	45.01	Attila Molnár	Hungary	3 February 2026	Czech Indoor Gala	Ostrava	
800 m	1:42.50	Josh Hoey	United States	24 January 2026	New Balance Indoor Grand Prix	Boston	
1500 m	3:29.63+	Jakob Ingebrigtsen	Norway	13 February 2025	Meeting Hauts-de-France Pas-de-Calais	Liévin	
Mile	3:45.14	Jakob Ingebrigtsen	Norway	13 February 2025	Meeting Hauts-de-France Pas-de-Calais	Liévin	
3000 m	7:22.91	Grant Fisher	United States	8 February 2025	Millrose Games	New York City	
60 m hurdles	7.29	Grant Holloway	United States	24 February 2021	Villa de Madrid Indoor Meeting	Madrid	
High jump	2.35 m	Naoto Tobe	Japan	2 February 2019	Weltklasse in Karlsruhe	Karlsruhe	
Long jump	8.45 m	Bozhidar Sarâboyukov	Bulgaria	11 February 2026	Belgrade Indoor Meeting	Belgrade	
Triple jump	17.82 m	Hugues Fabrice Zango	Burkina Faso	9 February 2021	Meeting Hauts-de-France Pas-de-Calais	Liévin	
Pole vault	6.31 m	Armand Duplantis	Sweden	12 March 2026	Mondo Classic	Uppsala	
Shot put	22.58 m	Ryan Crouser	United States	11 February 2023	Millrose Games	New York City	

Women's Indoor Tour records
Event	Record	Athlete	Nationality	Date	Meet	Place	Ref.
60 m	6.98	Elaine Thompson	Jamaica	18 February 2017	Birmingham Indoor Grand Prix	Birmingham	
400 m	49.63	Femke Bol	Netherlands	10 February 2024	Meeting Hauts-de-France Pas-de-Calais	Liévin	
800 m	1:54.87	Keely Hodgkinson	Great Britain	19 February 2026	Meeting Hauts-de-France Pas-de-Calais	Liévin	
1500 m	3:53.09	Gudaf Tsegay	Ethiopia	9 February 2021	Meeting Hauts-de-France Pas-de-Calais	Liévin	
Mile	4:16.16	Gudaf Tsegay	Ethiopia	8 February 2023	Copernicus Cup	Toruń	
3000 m	8:16.69	Gudaf Tsegay	Ethiopia	25 February 2023	World Indoor Tour Final	Birmingham	
60 m hurdles	7.67	Devynne Charlton	Bahamas	11 February 2024	Millrose Games	New York City	
High jump	2.02 m	Yaroslava Mahuchikh	Ukraine	31 January 2020	Weltklasse in Karlsruhe	Karlsruhe	
Long jump	7.07 m	Malaika Mihambo	Germany	7 February 2025	Weltklasse in Karlsruhe	Karlsruhe	
Triple jump	15.43 m	Yulimar Rojas	Venezuela	21 February 2020	Villa de Madrid Indoor Meeting	Madrid	
Pole vault	4.91 m	Anzhelika Sidorova	Authorised Neutral Athletes	8 February 2019	Villa de Madrid Indoor Meeting	Madrid	
Shot put	20.69 m	Jessica Schilder	Netherlands	6 March 2026	ISTAF Indoor	Berlin	

Other records
Record	#	Holder	Events
Most titles	2	Adam Kszczot (POL)	800 metres (2016 and 2018)
Most event wins (men)	6	Adam Kszczot (POL)	800 metres
Most event wins (women)	3	Léa Sprunger (SUI); Keely Hodgkinson (GBR); Genzebe Dibaba (ETH); Mariya Lasitskene (ANA); Hellen Obiri (KEN)	400 metres 800 metres 1500, 3000 metres High jump 3000 metres
