= 2021 World Athletics Indoor Tour =

2021 IAAF World Indoor Tour
- Edition: 6th
- Dates: 24 January – 27 February
- Meetings: 25

The 2021 IAAF World Indoor Tour was the sixth edition of the World Athletics Indoor Tour, the highest series of international track and field indoor meetings.

The tour expanded in 2021 with the introduction of three tiers of competition – Gold, Silver and Bronze – comprising 26 meetings in Europe and North America. and retains six gold standard events for 2021, five in Europe and one in the United States.

== Meetings ==
Meet	Stadium	City	Country	Date
2021 World Athletics Indoor Tour – Gold Meeting calendar
Weltklasse in Karlsruhe	Dm-Arena	Karlsruhe	Germany	29 January
Banskobystricka latka – High Jump Men	Stiavnicky Sport Hall	Banská Bystrica	Slovakia	2 February
Meeting Hauts-de-France Pas-de-Calais	Arena Stade Couvert	Liévin	France	9 February
New Balance Indoor Grand Prix	Ocean Breeze Athletics Complex	New York City	United States	13 February
Copernicus Cup	Arena Toruń	Toruń	Poland	17 February
Villa de Madrid Indoor Meeting	Gallur Municipality Sport Complex	Madrid	Spain	24 February
2021 World Athletics Indoor Tour – Silver Meeting calendar
American Track League Meeting 1	Randal Tyson Track Center	Fayetteville	United States	24 January
ISTAF Indoor Düsseldorf	ISS Dome	Düsseldorf	Germany	31 January
American Track League Meeting 2	Randal Tyson Track Center	Fayetteville	United States	31 January
Banskobystricka latka – High Jump Women	Stiavnicky Sport Hall	Banská Bystrica	Slovakia	2 February
Czech Indoor Gala	Atletická hala Ostrava	Ostrava	Czech Republic	3 February
ISTAF Indoor	Mercedes-Benz Arena	Berlin	Germany	5 February
Meeting Metz Moselle Athlelor	L'Anneau-Halle d'athlétisme de Metz	Metz	France	6 February
Perche Elite Tour	Complexe Kindarena	Rouen	France	6 February
American Track League Meeting 3	Randal Tyson Track Center	Fayetteville	United States	7 February
American Track League Meeting 4	Randal Tyson Track Center	Fayetteville	United States	21 February
All Star Perche by Quartus	Maison des Sports	Clermont-Ferrand	France	27 February
2021 World Athletics Indoor Tour – Bronze Meeting calendar
Hvězdy v Nehvizdech		Nehvizdy	Czech Republic	5 February
Indoor Combined Events	Lasnamäe Kergejõustikuhall	Tallinn	Estonia	6−7 February
PSD Bank Indoor Meeting	Helmut-Körnig-Halle	Dortmund	Germany	7 February
Orlen Cup	Atlas Arena	Łódź	Poland	12 February
CMCM Indoor Meeting	d'Coque	Kirchberg	Luxembourg	13 February
IFAM Indoor	Flanders Sports Arena	Ghent	Belgium	13 February
Meeting de l'Eure	Stade couvert Jesse Owens	Val-de-Reuil	France	14 February
Serbian Open	Štark Arena	Belgrade	Serbia	24 February

== Results ==
non World Indoor Tour events

=== Men's track ===
#	Meeting	60 m	400 m	800 m	1500 m	3000 m	60 m h
1	Karlsruhe	-	Marvin Schlegel (GER); 46.61	Elliot Giles (GBR); 1:45.50	-	Bethwell Birgen (ETH); 7:34.12	Wilhem Belocian (FRA); 7.49
2	Banská Bystrica	-	-	-	-	-	-
3	Liévin	Marcell Jacobs (ITA); 6.54	-	Elliot Giles (GBR); 1:45.49	Jakob Ingebrigtsen (NOR); 3:31.80 AR	Getnet Wale (ETH); 7:24.98	Grant Holloway (USA); 7.32
4	Boston	Trayvon Bromell (USA); 6.50; Noah Lyles (USA); 20.80 (200m); Jereem Richards (TTO); 32.71 (300m)	Michael Norman (USA); 45.34	Donavan Brazier (USA); 1:44.21 AR; Bryce Hoppel (USA); 2:16.27 (1000m)	Oliver Hoare (AUS); 3:32.35 AR	Justyn Knight (CAN); 8:13.92 (2 Miles)	-
5	Toruń	-	-	Elliot Giles (GBR); 1:43.63	Selemon Barega (ETH); 3:32.97	-	Grant Holloway (USA); 7.38
6	Madrid	Arthur Cissé (CIV); 6.59	Pavel Maslák (CZE); 46.12	Mariano García (ESP); 1:45.66	Selemon Barega (ETH); 3:35.42	-	Grant Holloway (USA); 7.29 WR, AR
Overall		-	Pavel Maslák (CZE)	-	Selemon Barega (ETH)	-	Grant Holloway (USA)

=== Men's field ===
#	Meeting	High jump	Long jump	Triple jump	Pole vault	Shot put
1	Karlsruhe	-	Juan Miguel Echevarría (CUB) 8.18	-	Renaud Lavillenie (FRA) 5.95	-
2	Banská Bystrica	Gianmarco Tamberi (ITA); 2.31	-	-	-	-
3	Liévin	-	Juan Miguel Echevarria (CUB); 8.25	Hugues Fabrice Zango (BUR); 17.82	Armand Duplantis (SWE); 5.86	-
4	Boston	Trey Culver (USA); 2.33	-	-	-	-
5	Toruń	Maksim Nedasekau (BLR); 2.34	-	-	Sam Kendricks (USA); 5.80	Michał Haratyk (POL); 21.47
6	Madrid	-	Juan Miguel Echevarría (CUB) 8.14	-	-	-
Overall		Gianmarco Tamberi (ITA)	Juan Miguel Echevarría (CUB)	-	-	-

=== Women's track ===
#	Meeting	60 m	400 m	800 m	1500 m	3000 m	60 m h
1	Karlsruhe	Dina Asher-Smith (GBR); 7.08	-	-	Katharina Trost (GER); 4:12.02	Beatrice Chepkoech (KEN); 8:41.98	Nooralotta Neziri (FIN); 7.92
2	Banská Bystrica	-	–	-	-	-	-
3	Liévin	Javianne Oliver (USA); 7.10	–	Jemma Reekie (GBR); 2:00.64	Gudaf Tsegay (ETH); 3:53.09 WR, AR; Winfred Yavi (BHR); 5:45.09 (2000mSC)	Lemlem Hailu (ETH); 8:32.55	Nadine Visser (NED); 7.91
4	Boston	Kayla White (USA); 7.15	Shaunae Miller-Uibo (BAH); 50.21; Gabrielle Thomas (USA); 35.73 (300m); Olga Kosichenko (USA); 1:12.35 (500m)	Ajeé Wilson (USA); 2:01.79	Heather MacLean (USA); 4:06.32	Elinor Purrier (USA); 9:10.28 (2 Miles)	Kendra Harrison (USA); 7.82
5	Toruń	Javianne Oliver (USA); 7.08	Femke Bol (NED); 50.66	Habitam Alemu (ETH); 1:58.19	-	Lemlem Hailu (ETH); 8:31.24	Christina Clemons (USA); 7.81
6	Madrid	-	-	Habitam Alemu (ETH); 1:58.94	Hirut Meshesha (ETH); 4:09.42	Gudaf Tsegay (ETH); 8:22.65	Nadine Visser (NED); 7.81
Overall		Javianne Oliver (USA)	–	Habitam Alemu (ETH)	-	Lemlem Hailu (ETH)	-

=== Women's field ===
#	Meeting	High jump	Long jump	Triple jump	Pole vault	Shot put
1	Karlsruhe	-	-	Liadagmis Povea (CUB); 14.54	-	Auriol Dongmo (POR); 19.65
2	Banská Bystrica	– Yaroslava Mahuchikh (UKR); 2.06	–	-	-	-
3	Liévin	-	–	-	Holly Bradshaw (GBR); 4.73	Auriol Dongmo (POR); 19.18
4	Boston	-	–	-	Sandi Morris (USA); 4.60	-
5	Toruń	-	-	Paraskevi Papachristou (GRE); 14.60	-	-
6	Madrid	-	-	Tori Franklin (USA); 14.22	Iryna Zhuk (BLR); 4.67	-
Overall		-	–	Liadagmis Povea (CUB)	Iryna Zhuk (BLR)	Auriol Dongmo (POR)
