= 2027 World Athletics Indoor Tour =

Indoor track and field meetings

- Edition: 12th
- Dates: 5 December 2026 – 13 March 2027

The 2027 World Athletics Indoor Tour is the twelfth edition of the World Athletics Indoor Tour, the highest series of international indoor track and field meetings.

The tour returned with the biggest number of meetings yet, with 75 meetings across Europe, North America, and Asia, eight of which comprise the highest tier of events labelled Gold. Below the top tier, there were three other tiers labelled Silver, Bronze, and Challenger mirroring the outdoor World Athletics Continental Tour.

The international media rights for the tour was covered by Infront Sports & Media as part of a deal extending through the end of 2029.

For 2027, the Gold Level scoring disciplines are the men's 400m, 1500m, 60m hurdles, long jump, and high jump, as well as the women's 60m, 800m, 3000/5000m, triple jump, shot put and pole vault. Each athlete's best three results counted toward their overall point score. The athlete with the most points in each scoring discipline at the end of the tour will be declared the winner and awarded a US$10,000 bonus. They will also be offered a wild card entry for the next edition of the World Athletics Indoor Championships in Odisha, India, in 2028.

Each Gold meeting will offer at least US$7000 in prize money for each scoring discipline.

== Meetings ==
Date	Meeting	Venue	Country
Gold Level Meetings (8)
27 Jan	Belgrade Indoor Meeting	Belgrade	Serbia
2 Feb	Czech Indoor Gala	Ostrava	Czech Republic
4 Feb	World Indoor Tour Gold Madrid	Madrid	Spain
6 Feb	New Balance Indoor Grand Prix	Boston	United States
7 Feb	INIT Meeting Karlsruhe	Karlsruhe	Germany
10 Feb	Meeting Hauts-de-France Pas-de-Calais	Liévin	France
13 Feb	Millrose Games	New York City	United States
14 Feb	ORLEN Copernicus Cup	Toruń	Poland
Silver Level Meetings (25)
17 Jan	CMCM Indoor Meeting	Luxembourg	Luxembourg
22 - 23 Jan	NYC Indoor Grand Prix	New York City	United States
27 Jan	International Jump Meeting Cottbus	Cottbus	Germany
28 Jan	Meeting Maratón Valencia	Valencia	Spain
29 Jan	Elite Indoor Track Miramas Meeting	Miramas	France
29 - 30 Jan	DeLoss Dodds Invitational	Manhattan	United States
30 Jan	Gorzów Jump Festival	Gorzów	Poland
30 Jan	Meeting de L'Eure	Val-de-Reuil	France
31 Jan	Sound Invite	Salem	United States
3 Feb	Udin Jump Development	Udine	Italy
5 Feb	ISTAF Indoor	Berlin	Germany
6 Feb	Fly Athens Indoor	Athens	Greece
6 Feb	Hustopečské skákání	Hustopeče	Czech Republic
6 Feb	Perche en Or	Roubaix	France
9 Feb	Beskyd bar	Třinec	Czech Republic
12 Feb	Orlen Cup Łódź	Łódź	Poland
13 Feb	ISTAF Indoor Düsseldorf	Düsseldorf	Germany
13 Feb	Perche Elite Tour Rouen	Rouen	France
14 Feb	Meeting de Paris Indoor	Paris	France
16 Feb	Hvězdy v Nehvizdech	Nehvizdy	Czech Republic
16 Feb	Banskobystrická latka	Banská Bystrica	Slovakia
26 Feb	Metz Meeting Moselle Athlélor	Metz	France
28 Feb	All Star Perche	Clermont-Ferrand	France
12 - 13 Mar	National Indoor Athletics Grand Prix 3	Chengdu	China
12 - 13 Mar	Perch'Xtrem	Caen	France
Bronze Level Meetings (14)
19 Jan	Aarhus SPRINT’n’JUMP	Århus	Denmark
22 Jan	Meeting Indoor Nantes Métropole	Nantes	France
23 Jan	Full Moon Jump	Göteborg	Sweden
23 Jan	Sparkassen Indoor Meeting Dortmund	Dortmund	Germany
23 Jan	Starpeche	Bordeaux	France
26 Jan	Tampere Indoor Meeting	Tampere	Finland
29 Jan	13. Erfurt Indoor 2026	Erfurt	Germany
29 - 30 Jan	PNC Lenny Lyles Invitational	Louisville	United States
30 Jan	Perche aux étoiles	Tremblay-en-France	France
6 Feb	Meeting Indoor de Lyon	Lyon	France
6 Feb	Miting Catalunya	Sabadell	Spain
9 - 10 Feb	Memorial Josip Gasparac	Osijek	Croatia
12 Feb	BKK Freundenburg High Jump Meeting	Weinheim	Germany
16 Feb	The Dutch Indoor	Apeldoorn	Netherlands
Challenger Level Meetings (28)
5 Dec	Premier Track Classic	Louisville	United States
5 Dec	Visit Winston-Salem College Kickoff	Winston-Salem	United States
09 Jan	Fana stavhoppgalla	Bergen	Norway
17 Jan	Česká tyčka	Prague	Czech Republic
23 Jan	Inter Hallenmeeting	Chemnitz	Germany
23 Jan	Antequera Indoor Match	Antequera	Spain
23 Jan	Meeting de Saut en Hauter d'Hirson	Hirson	France
23 Jan	Vault Manchester	Manchester	Great Britain
23 Jan	Memorial Alessio Giovannini	Ancona	Italy
30 Jan	International High Jump Gala Elmos	Herentals	Belgium
30 Jan	IFAM Gent Indoor	Gent	Belgium
30 Jan	Nordhausen Indoor Kugelstossen	Nordhausen	Germany
30 Jan	Jablonec Indoor	Jablonec nad Nisou	Czech Republic
30 Jan	Vienna Danube Indoor	Vienna	Austria
30 Jan	Vinthundsvintern	Sollentuna	Sweden
31 Jan	Rochlitz Shot Put Meeting	Rochlitz	Germany
31 Jan	Slovenian Indoor Meeting	Novo Mesto	Slovenia
5 - 6 Feb	Penn Classic	Philadelphia	United States
6 Feb	IFAM Louvain-La-Neuve Indoor	Louvain-La-Neuve	Belgium
6 Feb	McGhee's EAP Indoor Invitational	Glasgow	Great Britain
6 Feb	Meeting Indoor de Limoges	Limoges	France
13 Feb	Aadax Locked-In	Göteborg	Sweden
13 Feb	Cochrane Elite Invitational	Winston-Salem	United States
13 Feb	Meeting Internacional de Ourense	Ourense	Spain
14 Feb	Bannister Winter Classic	Göteborg	Sweden
27 Feb	Air Loughborough	Loughborough	Great Britain
4 - 5 Mar	National Indoor Athletics Grand Prix 1	TBD	China
8 - 9 Mar	National Indoor Athletics Grand Prix 2	TBD	China

== Gold Tour results ==
non World Indoor Tour events

=== Men's track ===
#	Meeting	60 m	400 m	800 m	1500 m	3000 m	60 m h
1	Belgrade	-	-	-	-	-	-
2	Ostrava	-	-	-	-	-	-
3	Madrid	-	-	-	-	-	-
4	Boston	-	-	-	-	-	-
5	Karlsruhe	-	-	-	-	-	-
6	Liévin	-	-	-	-	-	-
7	New York	-	-	-	-	-	-
8	Toruń	-	-	-	-	-	-
Overall		-	-	-	-	-	-

=== Men's field ===
#	Meeting	High jump	Long jump	Triple jump	Pole vault	Shot put
1	Belgrade	-	-	-	-	-
2	Ostrava	-	-	-	-	-
3	Madrid	-	-	-	-	-
4	Boston	-	-	-	-	-
5	Karlsruhe	-	-	-	-	-
6	Liévin	-	-	-	-	-
7	New York	-	-	-	-	-
8	Toruń	-	-	-	-	-
Overall		-	-			

=== Women's track ===
#	Meeting	60 m	400 m	800 m	1500 m	3000 m	60 m h
1	Belgrade	-	-	-	-	-	-
2	Ostrava	-	-	-	-	-	-
3	Madrid	-	-	-	-	-	-
4	Boston	-	-	-	-	-	-
5	Karlsruhe	-	-	-	-	-	-
6	Liévin	-	-	-	-	-	-
7	New York	-	-	-	-	-	-
8	Toruń	-	-	-	-	-	-
Overall		-	-	-	-	-	-

=== Women's field ===
#	Meeting	High jump	Long jump	Triple jump	Pole vault	Shot put
1	Belgrade	-	-	-	-	-
2	Ostrava	-	-	-	-	-
3	Madrid	-	-	-	-	-
4	Boston	-	-	-	-	-
5	Karlsruhe	-	-	-	-	-
6	Liévin	-	-	-	-	-
7	New York	-	-	-	-	-
8	Toruń	-	-	-	-	-
Overall		-	-	-	-	-
