= 2016 IAAF World Indoor Tour =

- Edition: inaugural
- Dates: 6 February - 20 February
- Meetings: 4
- Individual Prize Money (US$): US$ 20,000 per winner

The 2016 IAAF World Indoor Tour was the inaugural edition of the IAAF World Indoor Tour, planned as an annual series of track and field indoor meetings. It was designed to create an IAAF Diamond League-style circuit for indoor track and field events, to raise the profile of indoor track and field athletics.

The Tour was announced with initially four events for 2016, three in Europe and one in the United States, leading to the 2016 IAAF World Indoor Championships in Portland, Oregon. Winners of the Tour enjoyed similar privileges in relation to World Indoor Championships qualification as Diamond League winners do in relation to World Championships in Athletics. This was the only edition of the tour that featured the Globen Galan, and the Stockholm leg was replaced by the International Copernicus Cup, a long-standing indoor event in Torún, Poland for 2017.

== Meetings ==
The following four meetings were confirmed for the 2016 season:

Meet	Stadium	City	Country	Date
Weltklasse in Karlsruhe	Dm-Arena	Karlsruhe / Rheinstetten	Germany	6 February
New Balance Indoor Grand Prix	Reggie Lewis Track and Athletic Center	Boston	United States	14 February
Globen Galan	Ericsson Globe	Stockholm	Sweden	17 February
Glasgow Indoor Grand Prix	Emirates Arena	Glasgow	United Kingdom	20 February

== Scoring system ==
At each meeting a minimum of 12 events were staged. Included in the 12 events will be a core group of five or six events split across the two-season cycle.

Tour events for 2016 were the men’s 60m, 800m, 3000/5000m, pole vault, triple jump and shot put, plus the women’s 400m, 1500m, 60m hurdles, high jump and long jump.

Points were allocated to the best four athletes in each event, with the winner getting 10 points, the runner up receiving seven points, the third-placed finisher getting five points and the athlete in fourth receiving three points.

The individual overall winner of each event received US $20,000 in prize money and, beginning with the 2016 edition in Portland, automatically qualified for the next edition of the IAAF World Indoor Championships as a ‘wild card’ entry, provided the member federation of that World Indoor Tour winner agreed to enter the athlete.

=== Indoor Tour Events ===
The following events are core Tour events for the 2019 indoor season:

Men

- 60 metres
- 800 metres
- 3000 metres
- Pole vault
- Triple jump
- Shot put

Women

- 400 metres
- 1500 metres
- 60 metre hurdles
- High jump
- Long jump

== Results ==
non World Indoor Tour events

=== Men's track ===
#	Meeting	60 m	400 m	800 m	1500 m	3000 m	60 m h
1	Karlsruhe	Mike Rodgers (USA); 6.52	-	Adam Kszczot (POL); 1:45.96	-	A. Kiprono Choge (KEN); 7:43.22	-
2	Boston	Mike Rodgers (USA); 6.53	Vernon Norwood (USA) (300m) 32.70; Boris Berian (USA) (600 m) 1:15.51	Andrew Wheating (USA) (1000 m) 2:16.68	Nick Willis (NZL) (mile) 3:53.27	Dejen Gebremeskel (ETH); 7:42.94	-
3	Stockholm	-	Abdalleleh Haroun (QAT) (500m) 59.83	Adam Kszczot (POL); 1:45.63	Ayanleh Souleiman (DJI) (1000m) 2:14.20 WR	Abdalaati Iguider (MAR); 7:39.04	-
4	Glasgow	Sean Safo-Antwi (GBR); 6.56	Pavel Maslák (CZE); 46.02	-	Abdalaati Iguider (MAR); 3:34.94	Mo Farah (GBR); 7:39.55	-Wenjun Xie (CHN); 7.63
Overall		Mike Rodgers (USA)	-	Adam Kszczot (POL)	-	A. Kiprono Choge (KEN)	-

=== Men's field ===
#	Meeting	High jump	Long jump	Triple jump	Pole vault	Shot put
1	Karlsruhe	-	Julian Howard (GER); 8.03m	Alexis Copello (CUB); 16.99 m	Renaud Lavillenie (FRA); 5.91 m	Tim Nedow (CAN); 20.89m
2	Boston	-	-	Omar Craddock (USA); 16.82	Sam Kendricks (USA); 5.77	Kurt Roberts (USA); 21.57
3	Stockholm	-	Andreas Otterling (SWE); 8.12	-	-	Tim Nedow (CAN); 21.33
4	Glasgow	-	Fabrice Lapierre (AUS); 8.08	Omar Craddock (USA); 16.93	Shawnacy Barber (CAN); 5.89	-
Overall		-	-	Omar Craddock (USA)	Shawnacy Barber (CAN)	Tim Nedow (CAN)

=== Women's track ===
#	Meeting	60 m	400 m	800 m	1500 m	3000 m	60 m h
1	Karlsruhe	Dafne Schippers (NED); 7.08	Natasha Hastings (USA); 52.60	-	Axumawit Embaye (ETH); 4:08.22	-	Kendra Harrison (USA); 7.86
2	Boston	English Gardner (USA); 7.15	Natasha Hastings (USA) (300 m) 36.35	-	Dawit Seyaum (ETH); 4:01.86	Meseret Defar (ETH); 8:30.83	Brianna McNeal (USA); 7.87
3	Stockholm	Jeneba Tarmoh (USA) (200 m) 23.38	Lisanne de Witte (NED); 53.21	-	Genzebe Dibaba (ETH) (mile) 4:13.31 WR	-	-
4	Glasgow	Dafne Schippers (NED); 7.10	Stephenie Ann McPherson (JAM); 52.05	Melissa Bishop (CAN); 2:00.19	Sifan Hassan (NED); 4:01.40	Nancy Chepkwemoi (KEN); 8:49.06	Kendra Harrison (USA); 7.92
Overall		-	Lisanne de Witte (NED)	-	Axumawit Embaye (ETH)	-	Nia Ali (USA)

=== Women's field ===
#	Meeting	High jump	Long jump	Triple jump	Pole vault	Shot put
1	Karlsruhe	Marie-Laurence Jungfleisch (GER); 1.93 m	-	-	-	-
2	Boston	-	Janay DeLoach (USA); 6.63	-	Jennifer Suhr (USA); 4.83	-
3	Stockholm	Ruth Beitia (ESP); 1.95	Ksenija Balta (EST); 6.76	-	Nikoléta Kyriakopoúlou (GRE); 4.81	-
4	Glasgow	Alessia Trost (ITA); Levern Spencer (LCA); 1.93	Lorraine Ugen (GBR); 6.80	-	-	-
Overall		Marie-Laurence Jungfleisch (GER)	Lorraine Ugen (GBR)	-	-	-

== Final 2016 World Indoor Tour standings ==
=== Men ===
60 m		800 m		3000m		Triple jump		Pole vault		Shot put	
Mike Rodgers (USA)	27	Adam Kszczot (POL)	30	Augustine Choge (KEN)	17	Omar Craddock (USA)	20	Shawnacy Barber (CAN)	24	Tim Nedow (CAN)	20
Kim Collins (SKN)	17	Nicholas Kiplangat (KEN); Andrew Wheating (USA)	10	Yomif Kejelcha (ETH)	14	Chris Carter (USA)	14	Sam Kendricks (USA); Renaud Lavillenie (FRA)	10	Kurt Roberts (USA)	10
Sean Safo-Antwi (GBR)	10	Nicholas Kiplangat (KEN); Andrew Wheating (USA)	10	3 athletes.	10	Alexis Copello (CUB)	10	Sam Kendricks (USA); Renaud Lavillenie (FRA)	10	3 athletes.	7

=== Women ===
400 m		1500		60m hurdles		High jump		Long jump	
Lisanne de Witte (NED)	15	Axumawit Embaye (ETH)	20	Nia Ali (USA)	21	Marie-Laurence Jungfleisch (GER)	15	Lorraine Ugen (GBR)	17
Natasha Hastings (USA); Stephenie Ann McPherson (JAM)	10	Gudaf Tsegay (ETH)	14	Kendra Harrison (USA)	20	Oksana Okuneva (UKR)	12	Shara Proctor (GBR)	12
Natasha Hastings (USA); Stephenie Ann McPherson (JAM)	10	3 athletes	10	2 athletes	10	3 athletes	10	2 athletes.	10
