= Habitam Alemu =

Ethiopian middle-distance runner

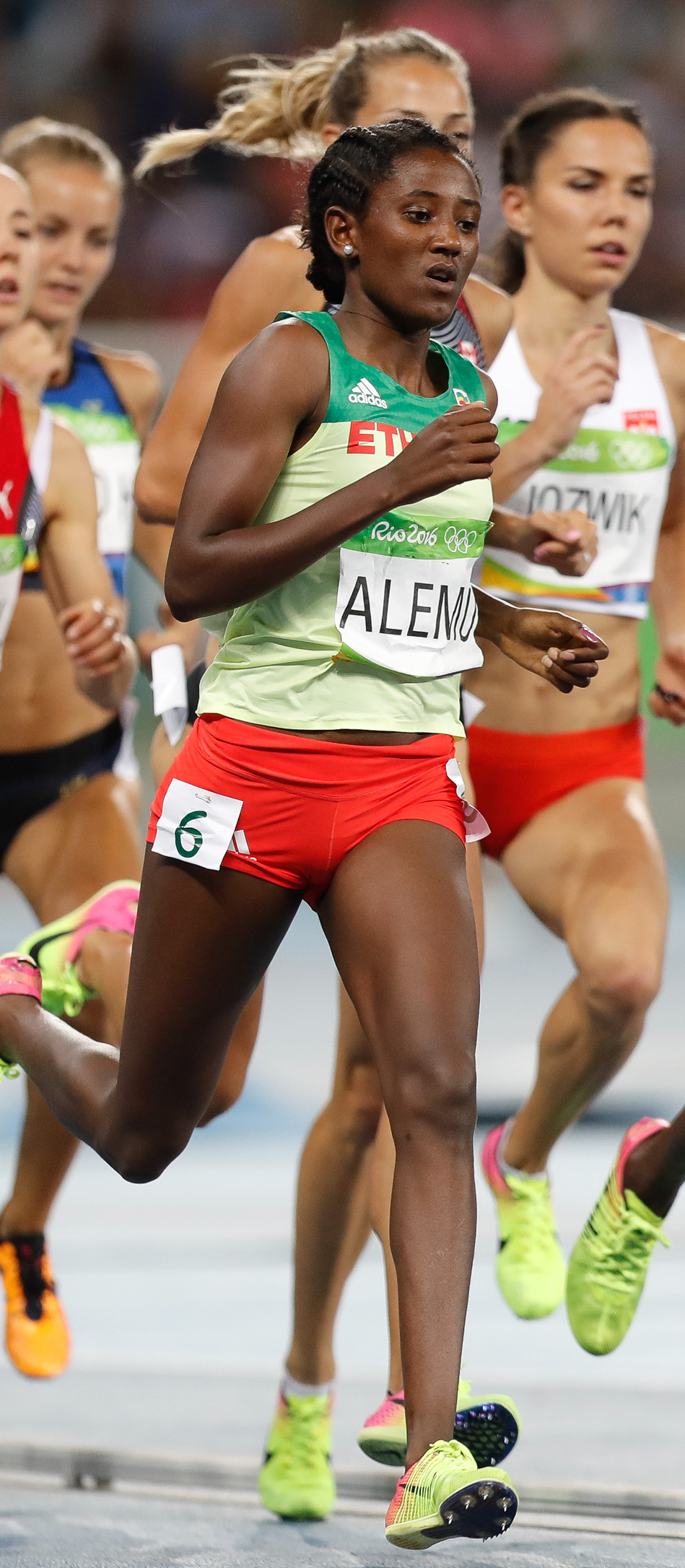
- Alemu at the 2016 Olympics

Personal information
- Full name: Habitam Alemu Bayih
- Born: 9 July 1997 (age 29) Merawi, Amhara Region, Ethiopia
- Height: 171 cm (5 ft 7 in)
- Weight: 52 kg (115 lb)

Sport
- Sport: Track and field
- Events: 800 metres 1500 metres

Achievements and titles
- Personal bests: 1:56.71 (2018); Indoors; 1:58.19 (2021)
Medal record
Women's athletics
Representing Ethiopia
African Championships
Bronze medal – third place	2018 Asaba	800 m
- Updated on 20 March 2022

Habitam Alemu Bayih (born 9 July 1997) is an Ethiopian middle-distance runner specialising in the 800 metres.

== Career ==
Born in Merawi, Ethiopia, Alemu was encouraged to try running by a school teacher who entered her into her first competition, which she won. Further encouraged by her brother, she began to train seriously, and after running at the national championships, she was invited to join a club in Addis Ababa.

Alemu represented her country at the 2015 World Championships, and was a finalist at the 2016 World Indoor Championships. At the 2016 Rio Olympics, she ran a personal best to progress through the heats, but was eliminated in the semi-finals.

She placed sixth in the 800 metres at the 2020 Tokyo Olympics.

Alemu twice earned overall 800m World Indoor Tour victory, winning in 2019 and in 2021.

== Competition record ==
Representing Ethiopia
Year	Competition	Venue	Position	Event	Notes
2015	World Championships	Beijing, China	38th (h)	800 m	2:03.19
2015	African Games	Brazzaville, Republic of the Congo	4th	800 m	2:02.29
2016	World Indoor Championships	Portland, United States	6th	800 m i	2:04.61
2016	Olympic Games	Rio de Janeiro, Brazil	15th (sf)	800 m	2:00.07 (PB h)
2017	World Championships	London, United Kingdom	14th (sf)	800 m	2:00.19
2018	World Indoor Championship	Birmingham, United Kingdom	4th	800 m i	2:01.10
2018	African Championships	Asaba, Nigeria	3rd	800 m	1:58.86
2021	Olympic Games	Tokyo, Japan	6th	800 m	1:57.56
2022	World Indoor Championships	Belgrade, Serbia	7th	800 m i	2:03.37
2022	World Championships	Eugene, United States	14th (sf)	800 m	2:00.37
2023	World Championships	Budapest, Hungary	19th (sf)	800 m	2:01.02
2024	World Indoor Championships	Glasgow, United Kingdom	5th	800 m	2:03.89
2024	Olympic Games	Paris, France	18th (rep)	800 m	2:02.73
2025	World Indoor Championships	Nanjing, China	11th (sf)	800 m	2:05.44

=== Circuit wins ===
- Diamond League
  - 2017 (800 m): Birmingham British Grand Prix
- World Athletics Indoor Tour 800 m overall winner: 2019, 2021
  - 2019: Toruń Copernicus Cup, Düsseldorf PSD Bank Meeting
  - 2021: Toruń, Villa de Madrid Indoor Meeting

== Personal bests ==
- 800 metres – 1:56.71 (Monaco 2018)
  - 800 metres indoor – 1:58.19 (Toruń 2021)
- 1500 metres – 4:01.41 (Doha 2018)
  - 1500 metres indoor – 4:02.52 (Toruń 2022)
