= Nathan Strother =

American track and field athlete

Personal information
- Nationality: American
- Born: September 6, 1995 (age 30) Norcross, Georgia, U.S.
- Height: 1.83 m (6 ft 0 in)

Sport
- Country: United States
- Sport: Track and field
- Event: Sprinting
- College team: Tennessee Volunteers men's track and field
- Club: Adidas
- Turned pro: 2018

Achievements and titles
- Personal best(s): 4 × 400 m: 2:59.78 (London 2018); 200 m: 20.76 (Fayetteville 2018); 400 m: 44.34 (Knoxville 2018)
Medal record
Men's track and field
Representing the United States
World Championships
Gold medal – first place	2019 Doha	4 × 400 m relay
IAAF Continental Cup
Bronze medal – third place	2018 Ostrava	400 m
NACAC Championships
Gold medal – first place	2018 Toronto	4 × 400 m relay
Athletics World Cup
Gold medal – first place	2018 London	4 × 400 m relay

Nathan Strother (born September 6, 1995) is an American sprinter. Nathan Strother is a 2019 IAAF World Indoor Tour Winner. Strother is a member of gold medal 4 × 400 m relays at 2018 Toronto NACAC Championships, 2018 Athletics World Cup, and bronze in 400 m 2018 IAAF Continental Cup.

== Career ==
Strother is a 2019 IAAF World Indoor Tour Winner. Strother is a member of gold medal 4 × 400 m relays at 2018 Toronto NACAC Championships, 2018 Athletics World Cup, and bronze in 400 m 2018 IAAF Continental Cup.

Year	Competition	Venue	Position	Event	Notes
IAAF Championships
2019	IAAF World Relays	Yokohama, Japan		Mixed 4 × 400 m relay	
2018	IAAF Continental Cup	Ostrava, Czech Republic	3rd place	400 meters	45.28
2018	2018 NACAC Championships	Toronto, Canada	1st place	4 × 400 meters	3:00.60
2018	2018 Athletics World Cup	London, England	1st place	4 × 400 meters	2:59.78
USATF Championships
2018	2018 USA Outdoor Track and Field Championships	Drake University	4th place	400 metres	44.89
2017	2017 USA Outdoor Track and Field Championships	Sacramento State University	11th place	400 metres	45.25
2016	2016 United States Olympic Trials (track and field)	University of Oregon	23rd place	400 metres	46.36

== NCAA ==
Strother is a 11-time NCAA Division I All-American and Southeastern Conference runner-up.

Representing University of Tennessee
School Year	Southeastern Conference Indoor track and field Championship	NCAA Indoor track and field Championship	Southeastern Conference Outdoor Track and Field Championship	NCAA Outdoor Track and Field Championship
2018 Senior	400 m – 45.59 – 2nd	400 m – 45.67 – 6th	400 m – 44.34 – 2nd	400 m – 45.72 – 12th

== Early life and prep ==
Nathan Strother graduated from Norcross High School c/o 2014 as a Georgia Class 6A state champion in the 400 m outdoor track and field Georgia High School Association 6A state champion with high school personal best times of 38.31 (300-meter hurdles), 7.25 m (long jump) and 47.37 (400 meters) which were Norcross HS records.

Representing Norcross High School
Georgia High School Association 6A
Year	Outdoor Track
2014	1st in the 400 m (47.37)

In 2014, Strother placed 4th in the long jump (7.09 m), 4th in the 300 m hurdles (38.31) and 1st in the 400 m (47.37) at Georgia High School Association 6A state meet.
