= Belgrade Indoor Meeting =

Annual indoor track and field competition

- Date: January - March
- Location: Belgrade, Serbia
- Event type: Indoor track and field
- Established: 2016
- Website: Belgrade Indoor Meeting

The Belgrade Indoor Meeting, formerly the Serbian Open Indoor Meeting, is an annual indoor track and field competition which takes place between January and March at the Atletska dvorana in Belgrade, Serbia. In 2025, the event became part of the World Athletics Indoor Tour.

== Editions ==
Belgrade Indoor Meeting editions
Ed.	Name	Date	Ref.
1st	2016 Serbian Open Indoor Meeting	1 Mar 2016	
2nd	2017 Serbian Open Indoor Meeting	18 Feb 2017	
3rd	2018 Serbian Open Indoor Meeting	21 Feb 2018	
4th	2019 Serbian Open Indoor Meeting	20 Feb 2019	
5th	2020 Serbian Open Indoor Meeting	27 Feb 2020	
6th	2021 Serbian Open Indoor Meeting	24 Feb 2021	
7th	2022 Belgrade Indoor Meeting	7 Mar 2022	
8th	2023 Belgrade Indoor Meeting	15 Feb 2023	
9th	2024 Belgrade Indoor Meeting	13 Feb 2024	
10th	2025 Belgrade Indoor Meeting	29 Jan 2025	
11th	2026 Belgrade Indoor Meeting	11 Feb 2026	

== World records ==
Over the course of its history, one world record has been set at the Belgrade Indoor Meeting.

World records set at the Belgrade Indoor Meeting
Year	Event	Record	Athlete	Nationality
2022	Pole vault	6.19 m	Armand Duplantis	Sweden

== Meeting records ==
=== Men ===
Men's meeting records of the Belgrade Indoor Meeting
Event	Record	Athlete	Nationality	Date	Meet	Ref.
60 m	6.53	Ronnie Baker	United States	29 January 2025	2025	
400 m	45.66	Attila Molnár	Hungary	29 January 2025	2025	
1500 m	3:37.49	Elliot Giles	Great Britain	7 March 2022	2022	
3000 m	8:09.06	Elzan Bibić	Serbia	1 March 2016	2016	
60 m hurdles	7.65	Petr Svoboda	Czech Republic	7 March 2022	2022	
High jump	2.26 m	Konstantinos Baniotis	Greece	21 February 2018	2018	
Pole vault	6.19 m	Armand Duplantis	Sweden	7 March 2022	2022	
Long jump	8.45 m	Bozhidar Sarâboyukov	Bulgaria	11 February 2026	2026	
Shot put	21.91 m	Tom Walsh	New Zealand	13 February 2024	2024	

=== Women ===
Women's meeting records of the Belgrade Indoor Meeting
Event	Record	Athlete	Nationality	Date	Meet	Ref.
60 m	7.08	Zaynab Dosso	Italy	29 January 2025	2025	
400 m	51.86	Andrea Miklos	Romania	13 February 2024	2024	
800 m	1:59.66	Tsige Duguma	Ethiopia	13 February 2024	2024	
1500 m	4:19.22	Daryia Barysevich	Belarus	21 February 2018	2018	
3000 m	8:56.32	Meseret Yeshaneh	Ethiopia	29 January 2025	2025	
60 m hurdles	7.86	Nadine Visser	Netherlands	29 January 2025	2025	
High jump	1.96 m	Morgan Lake	Great Britain	24 February 2021	2021	
Long jump	6.93 m	Ivana Španović	Serbia	21 February 2018	2018	
Triple jump	13.33 m	Eva Pepelnak	Slovenia	15 February 2023	2023	

== See also ==
- Sport in Serbia
