= Lorraine Ugen =

English long jumper and sprinter

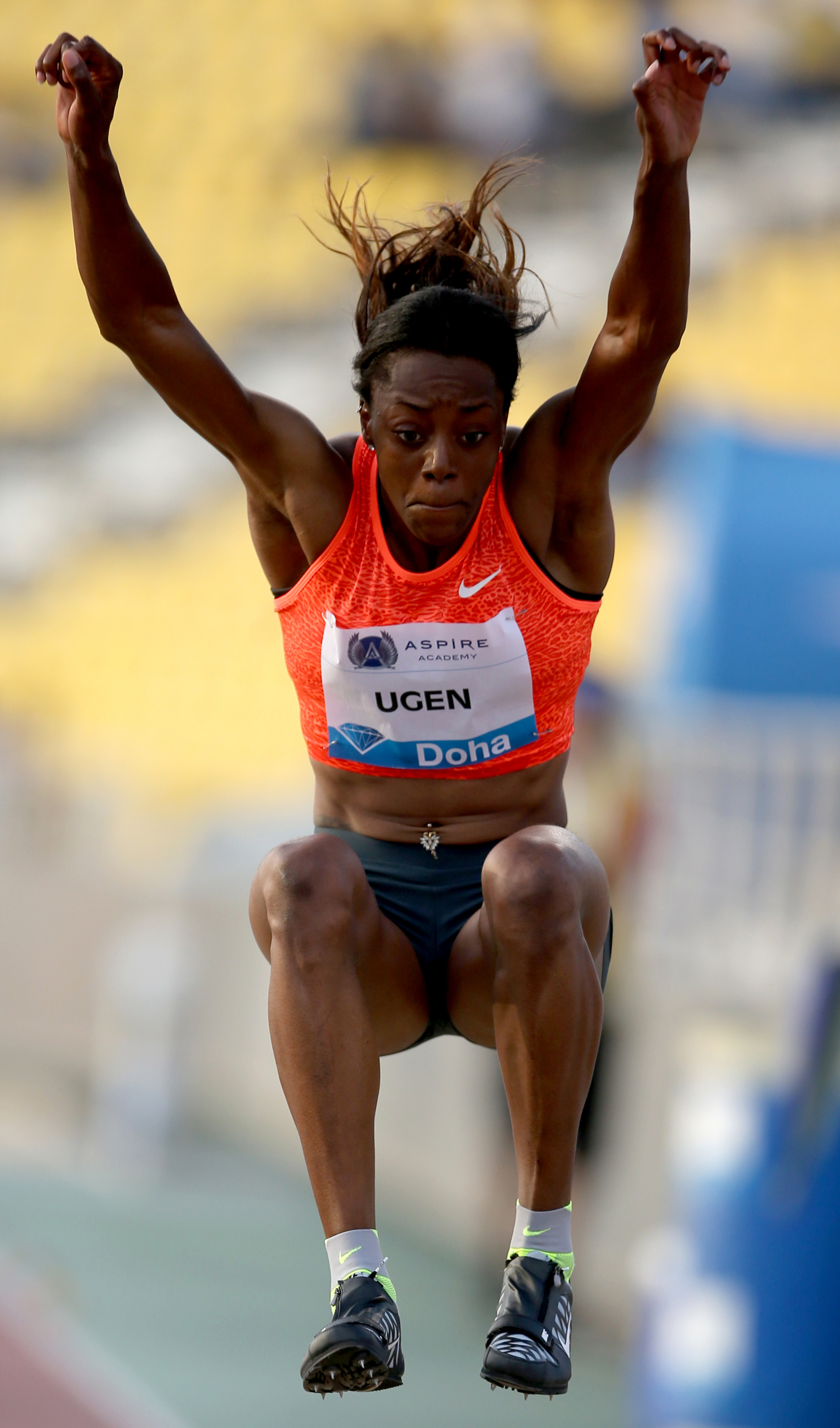
- Lorraine Ugen at the Qatar Athletic Super Grand Prix in 2015

Personal information
- Born: 22 August 1991 (age 35) London, England
- Education: Texas Christian University
- Height: 1.77 m (5 ft 10 in)
- Weight: 66 kg (146 lb)

Sport
- Country: Great Britain
- Sport: Long jump, sprint
- Coached by: Shawn Jackson

Achievements and titles
- Olympic finals: 2016
- Highest world ranking: 1 (2018)
Medal record
Women's athletics
Representing Great Britain
World Indoor Championships
Bronze medal – third place	2016 Portland	Long jump
Bronze medal – third place	2022 Belgrade	Long jump
European Indoor Championships
Silver medal – second place	2017 Belgrade	Long jump
Athletics World Cup
Gold medal – first place	2018 London	Long jump
Diamond League
Silver medal – second place	2017	Long jump
Bronze medal – third place	2016	Long jump
IAAF World Indoor Tour
Winner	2016	Long jump
Representing England
Commonwealth Games
Gold medal – first place	2018 Gold Coast	4 × 100m relay

Lorraine Ugen (born 22 August 1991) is an English long jumper and occasional 100 m sprinter with respective personal bests of 7.05 m and 11.32 s. Ugen competed for Great Britain at the 2016 Olympics in Rio in the long jump, finishing in eleventh place.

Ugen captained the Great Britain team at the inaugural Athletics World Cup in 2018, winning gold in the women's long jump. For England, she anchored the women's 4 x 100 metres relay team to gold at the 2018 Commonwealth Games. As a collegiate athlete in the United States, she won an NCAA indoor and an NCAA outdoor title in the long jump for Texas Christian University.

== Career ==
Ugen was born in London on 22 August 1991. As a child, she attended Townley Grammar School before going on to study at Christ the King Sixth Form College and then Brunel University London. She achieved national success at a young age, winning both the indoor and outdoor long jump titles at the 2009 English junior championships, as well as the English Schools' Athletics Championships. She was initially a member of Bexley Athletic Club, but later began training with Blackheath and Bromley Harriers Athletic Club. During the 2016 season, Lorraine joined the Thames Valley Harriers Athletic Club. In her international debut, she competed in qualifying only at the 2009 European Athletics Junior Championships, then met the same fate at the 2010 World Junior Championships in Athletics. She was runner-up at the British Athletics Championships in 2011, but failed to register a mark at the 2011 European Athletics U23 Championships.

Ugen went on to study at Texas Christian University in 2011 and began competing for the college's TCU Horned Frogs athletic team the following year. She made her first appearance at the NCAA Indoor and NCAA Outdoor Championships in 2012, but did not record a valid mark at either event. She achieved a personal best of 6.74 m (22 ft 1 1/4 in) at that year's UK Championships, placing second but being just short of the Olympic qualifying standard.

In 2013, she ranked fifth at the NCAA Indoors, then managed a jump of 6.77 m (22 ft 2 1/2 in) to win the NCAA Outdoor Division I title in the long jump. The mark ranked her in the top twenty in the world for the event that year. Internationally, she was a finalist at the 2013 European Athletics U23 Championships and represented Great Britain at the 2013 World Championships in Athletics, though she failed to record a valid mark.

Ugen began her 2014 season by winning the NCAA Indoor title with an indoor best of 6.73 m (22 ft 3/4 in), as well as taking the Big Ten Conference crown. She failed to defend her outdoor NCAA title, placing fourth with a mark under six and a half metres. Ugen competed for England for the first time at the 2014 Commonwealth Games where she placed fifth (5th). At the start of 2015 she jumped 6.72 m (22 ft 1/2 in) to win at the Tom Jones Memorial Invitational, then followed this with a then personal best of 6.93 m (22 ft 8 3/4 in) at the Portland, Oregon indoor athletics meeting, coming fourth. She has recently increased her personal best while soaring to great lengths at the European Indoor Championships in Belgrade during the 2017 season. With a new personal best of 6.97m, Ugen also gained a new British National Record and a silver medal.

She was selected to compete in the long jump for Team GB at the Tokyo 2020 Olympics, where she jumped 6.05m and didn't progress past the qualifying round.

== Personal bests ==
- Long jump (outdoor): 7.05 m (23 ft 1 1/2 in) (2018)
- Long jump (indoor): 6.97 m (22 ft 10 1/4 in)(2017)
- 100 metres: 11.32 seconds (2018)

== International competitions ==
Year	Competition	Venue	Position	Result
2009	European Junior Championships	Novi Sad, Serbia	20th (q)	5.85 m
2010	World Junior Championships	Moncton, Canada	17th (q)	5.56 m (-0.5 m/s)
2011	European U23 Championships	Ostrava, Czech Republic	NM (q)	NM
2013	European U23 Championships	Tampere, Finland	4th (q)	6.32 m
2013	World Championships	Moscow, Russia	NM (q)	NM
2014	Commonwealth Games	Glasgow, Scotland	5th	6.39 m
2015	World Championships	Beijing, China	5th	6.85 m
2016	World Indoor Championships	Portland, United States	3rd	6.93 m
2016	European Championships	Amsterdam, Netherlands	18th (q)	6.33 m (w)
2016	Olympic Games	Rio de Janeiro, Brazil	11th	6.58 m
2017	European Indoor Championships	Belgrade, Serbia	2nd	6.97 m
2017	World Championships	London, United Kingdom	5th	6.72 m
2018	Commonwealth Games	Gold Coast, Australia	4th	6.69 m
2018	Commonwealth Games	Gold Coast, Australia	1st	42.46 s
2018	World Cup	London, United Kingdom	1st	6.86 m
2018	European Championships	Berlin, Germany	9th	6.45 m
2021	Olympic Games	Tokyo, Japan	28th (q)	6.05 m
2022	World Indoor Championships	Belgrade, Serbia	3rd	6.82 m
2022	World Championships	Eugene, United States	10th	6.53 m

Sporting positions
Preceded by (Serbia) Ivana Španović	Women's long jump Best year performance 2018	Succeeded by (Germany) Malaika Mihambo
