= Bethwell Birgen =

Kenyan middle-distance runner

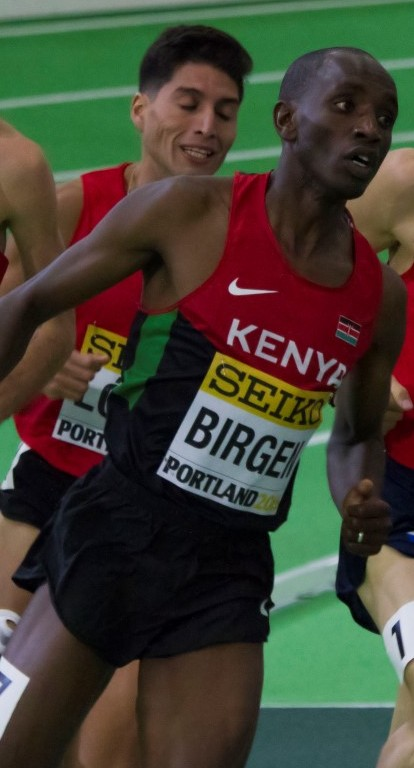

Personal information
- Nationality: Kenyan
- Born: 13 June 1987 (age 39)

Sport
- Sport: Athletics
- Event(s): 1500 metres 3000 metres
Medal record
World Indoor Championships
Bronze medal – third place	2018 Birmingham	3000 m
World Indoor Tour
Winner	2017	1500 m

Bethwell Birgen (born 6 August 1988) is a Kenyan middle-distance runner. His personal best of 3:30.77 minutes for the 1500 metres ranks him among the top fifty ever for the event, while his indoor best of 3:34.65 minutes is among the top twenty. He represented Kenya in the 1500 m at the 2012 IAAF World Indoor Championships and the 2013 World Championships in Athletics, but did not make the final on either occasion.

== Career ==
He made his first appearances on the European track and field circuit in 2009. He debuted with a personal best of 3:37.39 minutes for the 1500 metres to take fourth at the Bislett Games, reducing this by a further second and a half at the Leichtathletik-Gala in Wattenscheid, then placed fourth at the British Grand Prix in Gateshead. He was part of a mixed nations team in a 4×1500 metres relay at the Memorial Van Damme and helped set the fourth fastest time ever for the infrequently contested event. He set two personal bests in 2010: he ran 3:35.60 minutes for the 1500 m and 7:39.65 for the 3000 metres. He ran 3:34.59 to come seventh at the Shanghai Diamond League meeting in 2011, but failed to make the final at the Kenyan World Championships trials.

Birgen improved his times on the circuit significantly in 2012. He won the Weltklasse in Karlsruhe indoor meet and his time of 3:34.65 was the second fastest indoors that year. This, alongside runner-up placings at the XL Galan and Birmingham Indoor Grand Prix earned him selection for the 2012 IAAF World Indoor Championships, but on the global stage he was eliminated in the first round, the fastest runner not to progress. He knocked over three seconds off his 1500 m best at the Doha Diamond League meet, coming third behind Silas Kiplagat and Asbel Kiprop. A fourth-place finish in the mile run at the Prefontaine Classic saw him set another personal best of 3:50.43 minutes. He did not make the Kenyan Olympic team, coming fifth at the trials, but continued to compete on the 2012 IAAF Diamond League circuit. A run of 3:31.00 minutes ranked him seventh in the world that year, but only fifth in the quick race at Herculis. He was runner-up at the ISTAF Berlin and third at the Van Damme Memorial final.

At the start of 2013 he won the Russian Winter Meeting in Moscow, narrowly holding of Aman Wote to finish in 3:35.25 minutes (the seconds fastest indoors that season). In the 2013 IAAF Diamond League meetings he finished outside of the top three at all but the Doha meet, where he was runner-up. He had a repeat experience at the Monaco Herculis meeting, running a best of 3:30.77 minutes to rank fifth in the world, but fourth in the race. Despite disappointment on the track circuit, he was chosen to represent Kenya at the 2013 World Championships in Athletics. His brother Bernard Kiprop Koech was also running (in the marathon), making them one of several siblings to attend the event. In the World Championship 1500 metres he reached the semi-final but was tenth in that race and did not make the final.

Birgen made another strong start to the indoor circuit, winning the PSD Bank Meeting and was a close second to Silas Kiplagat the Russian Winter Meeting. He was chosen for the 2014 IAAF World Indoor Championships as a result.
