= Czech Indoor Gala =

Track and field competition in the Czech Republic

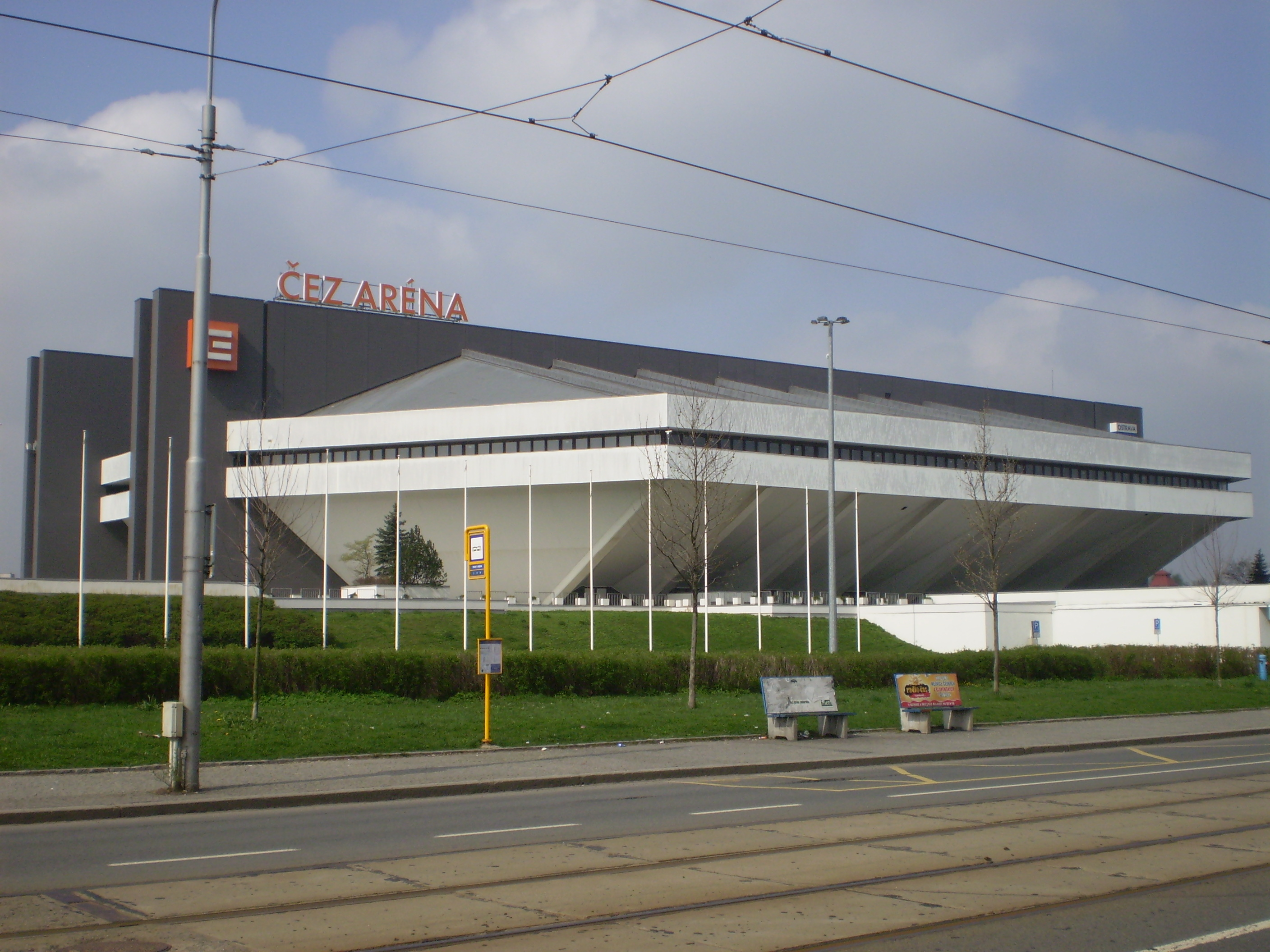
- The Ostravar Aréna hosts the meeting
- Date: January–February
- Location: Ostrava, Czech Republic
- Event type: Indoor track and field
- Established: 2009
- Website: Czech Indoor Gala
- 2026 Czech Indoor Gala

The Czech Indoor Gala is an annual indoor track and field competition which takes place in January or February in the Vítkovice Athletic Hall, which is located in the immediate vicinity of the Ostravar Aréna in Ostrava, Czech Republic. The meeting was first held in 2009 in Prague before it moved after unsteady intervals to Jablonec nad Nisou in 2016 and Ostrava in 2017. It was a World Athletics Indoor Tour Silver meeting, but in the 2024 World Athletics Indoor Tour it was upgraded to Gold status.

== Editions ==
The meeting began to be called the Czech Indoor Gala in 2017.

Czech Indoor Gala editions
Ed.	Name	Date	Ref.
	2009 Prague Indoor	25 Feb 2009	
	2014 Praha Indoor	24 Feb 2014	
	2016 Jablonec Indoor Gala	4 Mar 2016	
1st	2017 Mítink Ea-Czech Indoor Gala	13 Feb 2017	
2nd	2018 Czech Indoor Gala	25 Jan 2018	
3rd	2019 Czech Indoor Gala	12 Feb 2019	
4th	2020 Czech Indoor Gala	5 Feb 2020	
5th	2021 Czech Indoor Gala	3 Feb 2021	
6th	2022 Czech Indoor Gala	3 Feb 2022	
7th	2023 Czech Indoor Gala	2 Feb 2023	
8th	2024 Czech Indoor Gala	30 Jan 2024	
9th	2025 Czech Indoor Gala	4 Feb 2025	
10th	2026 Czech Indoor Gala	3 Feb 2026	

== Meeting records ==
=== Men ===
Men's meeting records of the Czech Indoor Gala
Event	Record	Athlete	Nationality	Date	Place	Ref.
60 m	6.49	Kim Collins	Saint Kitts and Nevis	25 February 2014	Prague	
200 m	20.43	Erik Erlandsson	Sweden	4 February 2025	Ostrava	
300 m	31.97	Bralon Taplin	Grenada	14 February 2017	Ostrava	
400 m	45.01	Attila Molnár	Hungary	3 February 2026	Ostrava	
500 m	1:00.36	Pavel Maslák	Czech Republic	25 February 2014	Prague	
800 m	1:43.83	Eliott Crestan	Belgium	3 February 2026	Ostrava	
1500 m	3:34.23	Isaac Nader	Portugal	30 January 2024	Ostrava	
Mile	3:54.17	Isaac Nader	Portugal	4 February 2025	Ostrava	
3000 m	7:38.05	Isaac Nader	Portugal	3 February 2026	Ostrava	
60 m hurdles	7.48	Jakub Szymański	Poland	3 February 2026	Ostrava	
High jump	2.42 m	Ivan Ukhov	Russia	25 February 2014	Prague	
Pole vault	5.75 m	Piotr Lisek	Poland	25 February 2014	Prague	
Long jump	8.30 m	Mattia Furlani	Italy	3 February 2026	Ostrava	
Triple jump	17.32 m	Pedro Pablo Pichardo	Cuba	25 February 2014	Prague	
Shot put	22.04 m	Jordan Geist	United States	3 February 2026	Ostrava	

=== Women ===
Women's meeting records of the Czech Indoor Gala
Event	Record	Athlete	Nationality	Date	Place	Ref.
50 m	6.09+	Zaynab Dosso	Italy	3 February 2026	Ostrava	
60 m	7.07	Ewa Swoboda	Poland	30 January 2024	Ostrava	
300 m	37.04	Denisa Rosolová	Czech Republic	25 February 2014	Prague	
400 m	50.54	Lieke Klaver	Netherlands	30 January 2024	Ostrava	
800 m	1:59.98	Nigist Getachew	Ethiopia	3 February 2026	Ostrava	
1500 m	4:00.62	Birke Haylom	Ethiopia	3 February 2026	Ostrava	
Mile	4:17.36	Freweyni Hailu	Ethiopia	30 January 2024	Ostrava	
3000 m	8:24.17	Freweyni Hailu	Ethiopia	4 February 2025	Ostrava	
60 m hurdles	7.78	Pia Skrzyszowska	Poland	3 February 2026	Ostrava	
High jump	2.00 m	Blanka Vlašić	Croatia	25 February 2014	Prague	
Pole vault	4.90 m	Yelena Isinbayeva	Russia	26 February 2009	Prague	
Long jump	6.38 m	Jana Velďáková	Slovakia	26 February 2009	Prague	
Triple jump	13.86 m	Neja Filipič	Slovenia	2 February 2023	Ostrava	
4 × 400 m relay	3:35.86	Lada Vondrová; T. Petržilková; M. Pírková; M. Hofmanová	Czech Republic	12 February 2019	Ostrava	
