= Arena Stade Couvert de Liévin =

Indoor arena in Liévin, France

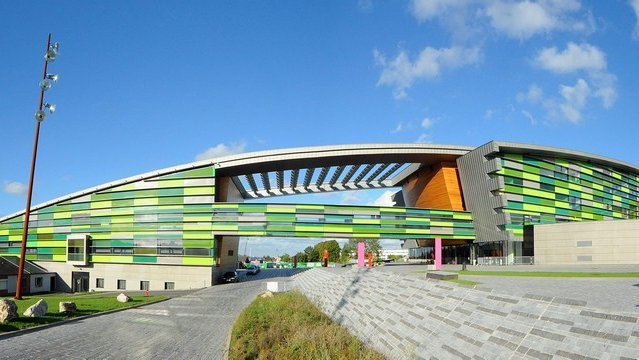
- Interactive map of Arena Stade Couvert de Liévin
- Former names: Stade Couvert Régional
- Location: Liévin, France
- Coordinates: 50.4109927°N 2.765851°E
- Capacity: 6,000; Concert: 12,000

Construction
- Groundbreaking: 1982

Tenant
- 1987 European Athletics Indoor Championships

Arena Stade Couvert de Liévin (formerly Stade Couvert Régional) is an indoor arena in Liévin, France.

Construction began in 1982. The arena is primarily used for indoor athletics with a capacity up to 6,000 people and for concerts. The arena is part of a complex that also includes an amphitheater, meeting and training rooms, and a self-service restaurant.

In 2024, the arena hosted one of the gold-level events on the 2024 World Athletics Indoor Tour. In 2025, it hosted the Indoor Triathlon World Cup.

Preceded by Palacio de Deportes; Madrid	European Indoor Championships in Athletics; Venue; 1987	Succeeded by Budapest Sportcsarnok; Budapest
