= Reggie Lewis Track and Athletic Center =

Indoor arena in Boston, Massachusetts

- Reggie Lewis Center "The Reggie"
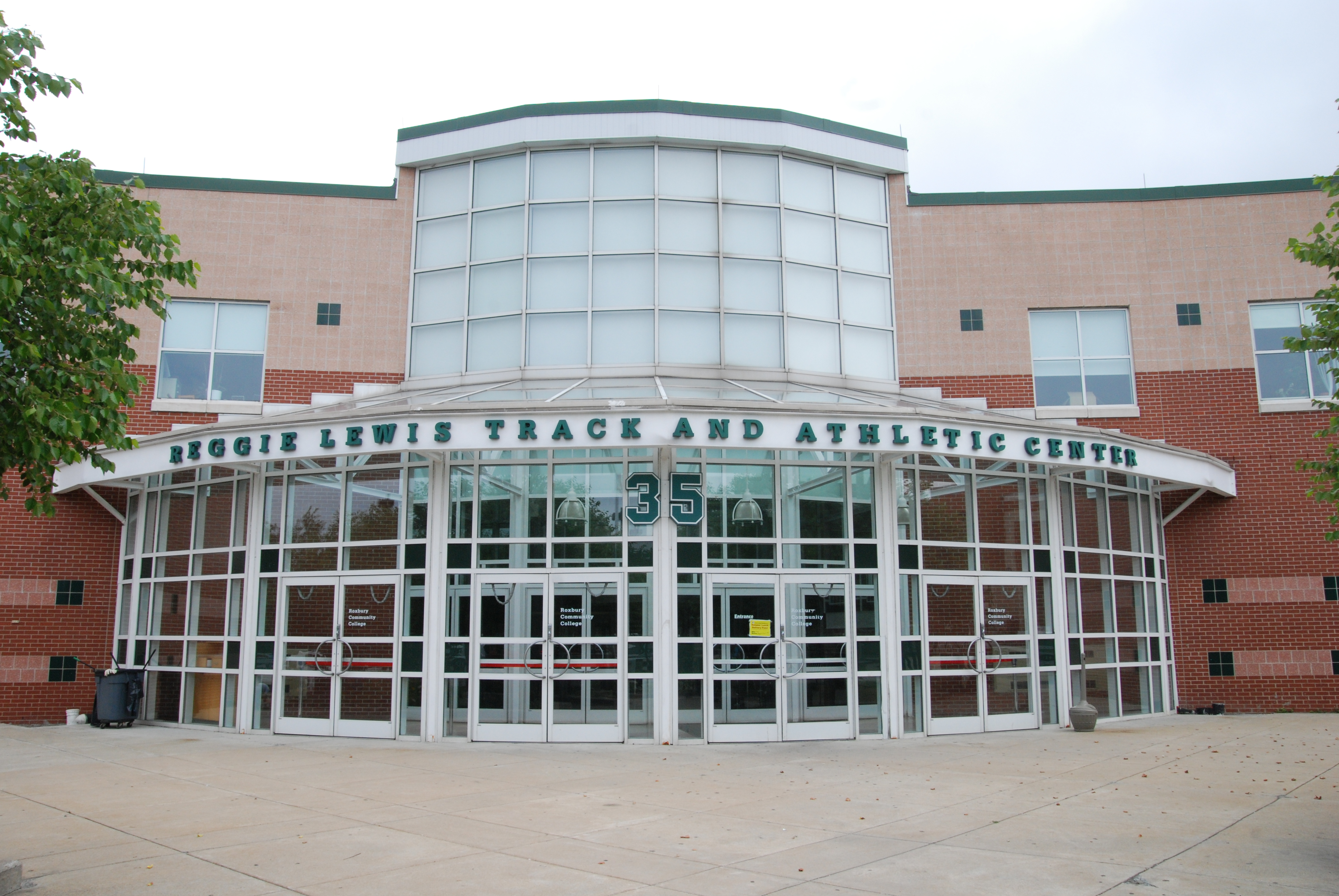
- Interactive map of Reggie Lewis Track and Athletic Center
- Location: Roxbury, Boston, Massachusetts, U.S.
- Coordinates: 42°19′55.27″N 71°5′34.17″W
- Owner: Roxbury Community College
- Operator: Roxbury Community College
- Capacity: 3,500 (5,000 expanded)

Construction
- Groundbreaking: 1993
- Opened: 1995

Tenant
- See Principal tenants

The Reggie Lewis Track and Athletic Center (RLTAC), commonly referred to as the Reggie Lewis Center or The Reggie, is an indoor track and indoor basketball stadium in the Roxbury neighborhood of Boston, Massachusetts. Partially funded by the state of Massachusetts, it is home to numerous MIAA indoor track and field conferences, along with the MIAA State Championships and the New England High School Championships. The site hosted the Boston Indoor Games from 1996 through 2020. USATF Masters Indoor Championships have been held at the facility several times.

== Namesake ==
The facility was named after Reggie Lewis, a former college basketball player for Northeastern University and professional player for the Boston Celtics. On April 29, 1993, he collapsed on the floor of the Boston Garden while playing a game against the Charlotte Hornets. On July 27, 1993, he suffered sudden cardiac death during an off-season practice at Brandeis University.

== Facilities ==
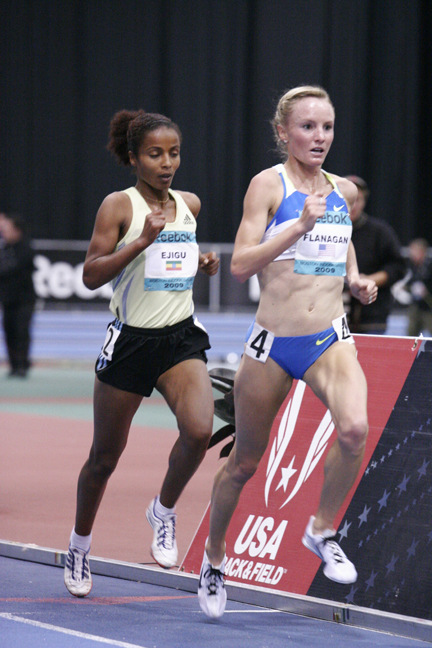
Shalane Flanagan and Sentayehu Ejigu at the 2009 Boston Indoor Games

=== Track and field ===
The Reggie Lewis Center has a 200-meter indoor Mondo Super X track, with areas for the high jump, long/triple jump, pole vault, and a 55/60 meter dash runway on the infield. It seats 3,500 people. There is a shot put cage in the corner of the stadium, although during professional meets, the shot put is usually held on the infield where it is more visible to all spectators.

The Reggie Lewis Center track and field facility is generally regarded as one of the premier facilities in the Northeastern United States, and is also one of the premier facilities in the United States as a whole. The venue hosted the Boston Indoor Games from 1996 through 2020. It has hosted the USA Indoor Track and Field Championships on multiple occasions.

=== Basketball ===
The Reggie Lewis Center also features a basketball gymnasium that can seat up to 1,300 people. It also has provisions for volleyball and wrestling.

=== Other ===
Also in the Center is a dance studio, a weight and fitness room, shower/locker facilities, seminar rooms, and more. The field house and gymnasium can also both be used for meetings and seminars on a larger scale. The annual food festival of the Boston Vegetarian Society has been held here numerous times. The center also houses Bay State Physical Therapy, a Boston-based outpatient physical therapy clinic, which provides services to residents of the Roxbury community as well as the metro Boston area.

== Principal tenants ==
While there are many tenants of the Reggie Lewis Center, some include:

- Roxbury Community College basketball team
- Nike Indoor Nationals
- ECAC Conference Championships in indoor track
- Northeast 10 Conference Championships in indoor track
- New England High School Championships in indoor track
- MIAA State Championships in indoor track
- Massachusetts State Track Coaches Association (for their various indoor track meets)
- Tri County Track and Field League
- Bay State Conference (track and field)
- Dual County League (track and field)
- Old Colony League (track and field)
- Atlantic Coast League (track and field)
- Patriot League (track and field)
- Hockomock League (track and field)
- Middlesex League (track and field)
- Merrimack Valley Conference (track and field)
- Commonwealth Athletic Conference (track and field)

=== Former tenants ===
- Boston Indoor Games (1996–2020)

== Facility records ==
The following are the top marks recorded at the Reggie Lewis track:

=== Men ===
Event	Performance	Athlete/Team	Affiliation/City	Year
55 M	6.20	Nic Alexander	Abilene Christian University	2000
60 M	6.45	Maurice Greene	Nike	1999
55 M Hurdles	7.12	Deworski Odom	St. Augustine's	2000
60 M Hurdles	7.37	Terrence Trammell	Unattached	2009
200 M	20.72	Bryan Bronson	PowerAde	1997
300 M	32.10	Jereem Richards	Trinidad and Tobago	2018
400 M	45.85	Dave Dopek	PowerAde	1997
500 M	1:01.84	Jarrin Solomon	Trinidad and Tobago	2014
600 M	1:14.39	Donavan Brazier	United States	2020
800 M	1:45.11	Donavan Brazier	United States	2018
1000 M	2:19.92	David Krummenacker	Adidas	1999
1500 M	3:37.03	Chris O'Hare	Great Britain	2018
1 Mile Run	3:51.61	Nick Willis	New Zealand	2015
2 Mile Run	8:16.15	Paul Bitok	Puma	2000
3000 M	7:32.87	Hagos Gebrhiwet	Ethiopia	2013
5000 M	13:11.50	Bernard Lagat	Nike	2010
4 × 200 m Relay	1:27.34	John Muir H.S.	Pasadena CA	1997
4 × 400 m Relay	3:11.39	St. Augustine	St. Augustine's	2000
4 × 800 m Relay	7:13.11	US All-Stars	United States	2014
Distance Medley	9:45.21	Georgetown	Georgetown	1999
High Jump	2.34m/7'8"	Erik Kynard	Nike/Jordan	2015
Long Jump	8.26m/26'0"	Savante Stringfellow	Nike	2004
Triple Jump	17.45m/57'3"	Tim Rusan	Nike	2003
Pole Vault	6.06m/19'10.5"	Steven Hooker	Australia	2009
Shot Put	21.83m/71'7.5"	John Godina	United States	2005
Weight throw	20.90m/68'7"	Mark McGehearty	Boston College	1997
Pentathlon	3,962	Marcell Almond	St. Paul H.S. CA	1998

=== Women ===
Event	Performance	Athlete/Team	Affiliation/City	Year
55 M	6.80	Julia O'Neil	Gardner-Webb	2000
60 M	7.07	Murielle Ahoure	Ivory Coast	2013
55 M Hurdles	7.81	Shawntel Newhouse	Abilene Christian University	2000
60 M Hurdles	7.74	Gail Devers	Nike	2003
200 M	23.07	Carlette Guidry	Reebok	1998
300 M	36.25	Natasha Hastings	United States	2016
400 M	51.96	Suziann Reid	Adidas	1998
500 M	1:09.23	Aliann Pompey	Manhattan College	2000
600 M	1:26.56	Ajee Wilson	adidas	2015
800 M	1:56.92 (AR)	Jolanda Ceplak	Slovenia	2002
1000 M	2:35.29	Regina Jacobs	Cliff Bar	2000
1500 M	3:59.98 (AR)	Regina Jacobs	United States	2003
1 Mile Run	4:24.80	Gabriela DeBues-Stafford	Canada	2019
2 Mile Run	9:10.50	Meseret Defar	Ethiopia	2008
3000 M	8:30.05	Meseret Defar	Ethiopia	2005
5000 M	14:27.42	Tirunesh Dibaba	Ethiopia	2007
4 × 200 m Relay	1:37.17	Wilson High School	Long Beach, California	1997
4 × 400 m Relay	3:38.18	George Mason University	George Mason	1999
4 × 800 m Relay	8:46.35	Georgetown	Georgetown	2000
Distance Medley	11:13.6	Georgetown	Georgetown	1999
High Jump	1.86m/6'0"	Angela Bradburn	Nike International	1998
Long Jump	20'11.75"	Nolle Graham	Seton Hall University	2000
Triple Jump	13.41m/44'0"	Niambi Dennis	Unattached	1997
Pole Vault	4.88m/16'0"	Jenn Suhr	United States	2012
Shot Put	15.67m/51'05"	Heather Leverington	Emporia State	2000
Weight throw	18.74m/61'5.75"	Michelle Clayton	East Carolina University	1999
