= PSD Bank Meeting =

Annual indoor track and field competition

- Date: February
- Location: Düsseldorf, Germany
- Event type: Track and field
- Established: 2006
- Website: PSD Bank Meeting at the Wayback Machine (archived 2019-09-10)

The PSD Bank Meeting was an annual indoor track and field competition which took place in February at the Arena-Sportpark in Düsseldorf, Germany. The inaugural edition 1. Internationales Indoor Meeting Düsseldorf was held in 2006 and attracted a sell-out crowd of 1500 people. The competition was created following investment by the Düsseldorf municipal council, bringing a new usage to the venue which had served as a training facility for the 1977 IAAF World Cup.

The second edition of the competition attracted a number of high calibre athletes from Europe, Africa, Asia and North America, with David Gillick's Irish national record in the 400 metres being a highlight. The meeting was one of a handful of competitions which holds permit status from the European Athletics Association. It established itself on the international circuit with frequent world-leading performances from athletes and typically sell-out editions in the 2000 capacity venue.

In 2008, Cuban Dayron Robles ran 7.33 seconds for the 60 metres hurdles which was a Panamerican record for the event and the second fastest ever. Among the performances in 2010 was an Asian indoor record for the 5000 m by Essa Ismail Rashed. The sixth edition of the meeting in 2011 saw 18-year-old Isaiah Koech run the fourth fastest indoor 5000 metres in history, which was also the fastest ever by a junior athlete. Katja Demut also set a German record in the triple jump at that year's event.

The last edition took place in 2020. In 2021 a new meeting format was organized under the name ISTAF Indoor Düsseldorf that was new located at the ISS Dome.

From 2018 onwards the previously sponsor PSD Bank also started a main sponsorship at the Indoor Meeting in Dortmund.

== Meeting records ==
=== Men ===
Men's meeting records of the PSD Bank Meeting
| Event | Record | Athlete | Nationality | Date | Ref. | Video |
|---|---|---|---|---|---|---|
| 60 m | 6.43 | Su Bingtian | China | 6 February 2018 | | |
| 400 m | 45.81 | Pavel Maslák | Czech Republic | 30 January 2014 | | |
| 800 m | 1:45.42 | Adam Kszczot | Poland | 30 January 2014 | | |
| 1500 m | 3:34.63 | Nixon Chepseba | Kenya | 11 February 2011 | | |
| 3000 m | 7:35.71 | Selemon Barega | Ethiopia | 4 February 2020 | | |
| 5000 m | 12:53.29 | Isaiah Kiplangat Koech | Kenya | 11 February 2011 | | |
| 60 m hurdles | 7.33 | Dayron Robles | Cuba | 8 February 2008 | | |
| High jump | 2.34 m | Naoto Tobe | Japan | 20 February 2019 | | |
| Pole vault | 6.00 m | Armand Duplantis | Sweden | 4 February 2020 | | |
| Long jump | 7.98 m | Godfrey Mokoena | South Africa | 10 February 2012 | | |
| Long jump | 7.98 m | Ignisious Gaisah | Ghana | 10 February 2012 | | |
| Shot put | 22.17 m | Tomáš Staněk | Czech Republic | 6 February 2018 | | |

=== Women ===
Women's meeting records of the PSD Bank Meeting
| Event | Record | Athlete | Nationality | Date | Ref. |
|---|---|---|---|---|---|
| 60 m | 7.02 | Marie-Josée Ta Lou | Ivory Coast | 20 February 2019 | |
| 400 m | 52.21 | Antonina Krivoshapka | Russia | 10 February 2012 | |
| 800 m | 1:59.69 | Tetyana Petlyuk | Ukraine | 6 February 2007 | |
| 1500 m | 4:02.09 | Beatrice Chepkoech | Kenya | 4 February 2020 | |
| 60 m hurdles | 7.77 | Christina Manning | United States | 6 February 2018 | |
| Pole vault | 4.77 m | Anzhelika Sidorova | Russia | 20 February 2019 | |
| Long jump | 6.60 m | Funmi Jimoh | United States | 11 February 2011 | |
| Triple jump | 14.84 m | Yargelis Savigne | Cuba | 3 February 2010 | |
