= Copernicus Cup =

Annual indoor track and field competition

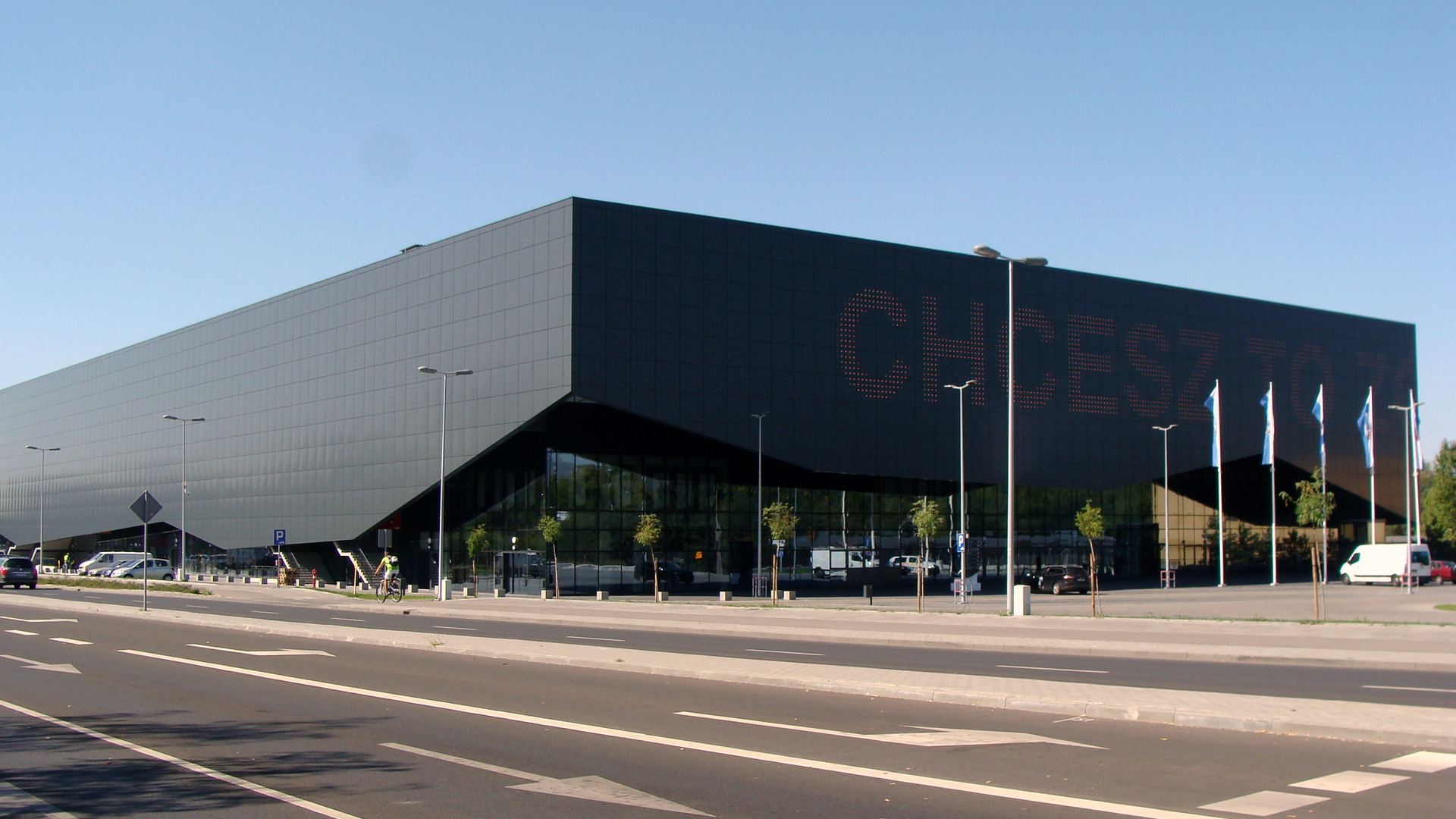
- The host stadium – the Kujawsko-Pomorska Arena Toruń
- Date: February
- Location: Toruń, Poland
- Event type: Indoor track and field
- Established: 2015
- Website: Copernicus Cup
- 2026 Copernicus Cup

Copernicus Cup is an annual indoor track and field competition which takes place in February at the multi-purpose sports and entertainment Kujawsko-Pomorska Arena Toruń in Toruń, Poland. The meeting is currently an World Athletics Indoor Tour Meeting. In 2019, the competition's title sponsor was PKN Orlen.

The venue also hosted the 2021 European Athletics Indoor Championships from 4 to 7 March 2021.

== Editions ==
Copernicus Cup editions
Ed.	Name	Date	Ref.
1st	2015 Copernicus Cup	3 Feb 2015	
2nd	2016 Copernicus Cup	12 Feb 2016	
3rd	2017 Copernicus Cup	10 Feb 2017	
4th	2018 Copernicus Cup	14 Feb 2018	
5th	2019 Copernicus Cup	6 Feb 2019	
6th	2020 Copernicus Cup	8 Feb 2020	
7th	2021 Copernicus Cup	16 Feb 2021	
8th	2022 Copernicus Cup	21 Feb 2022	
9th	2023 Copernicus Cup	7 Feb 2023	
10th	2024 Copernicus Cup	6 Feb 2024	
11th	2025 Copernicus Cup	16 Feb 2025	
12th	2026 Copernicus Cup	22 Feb 2026	

== World records ==
Over the course of its history, one world record has been set at the Copernicus Cup.

World records set at the Copernicus Cup
Year	Event	Record	Athlete	Nationality
2020	Pole vault	6.17 m	Armand Duplantis	Sweden

== Meeting records ==
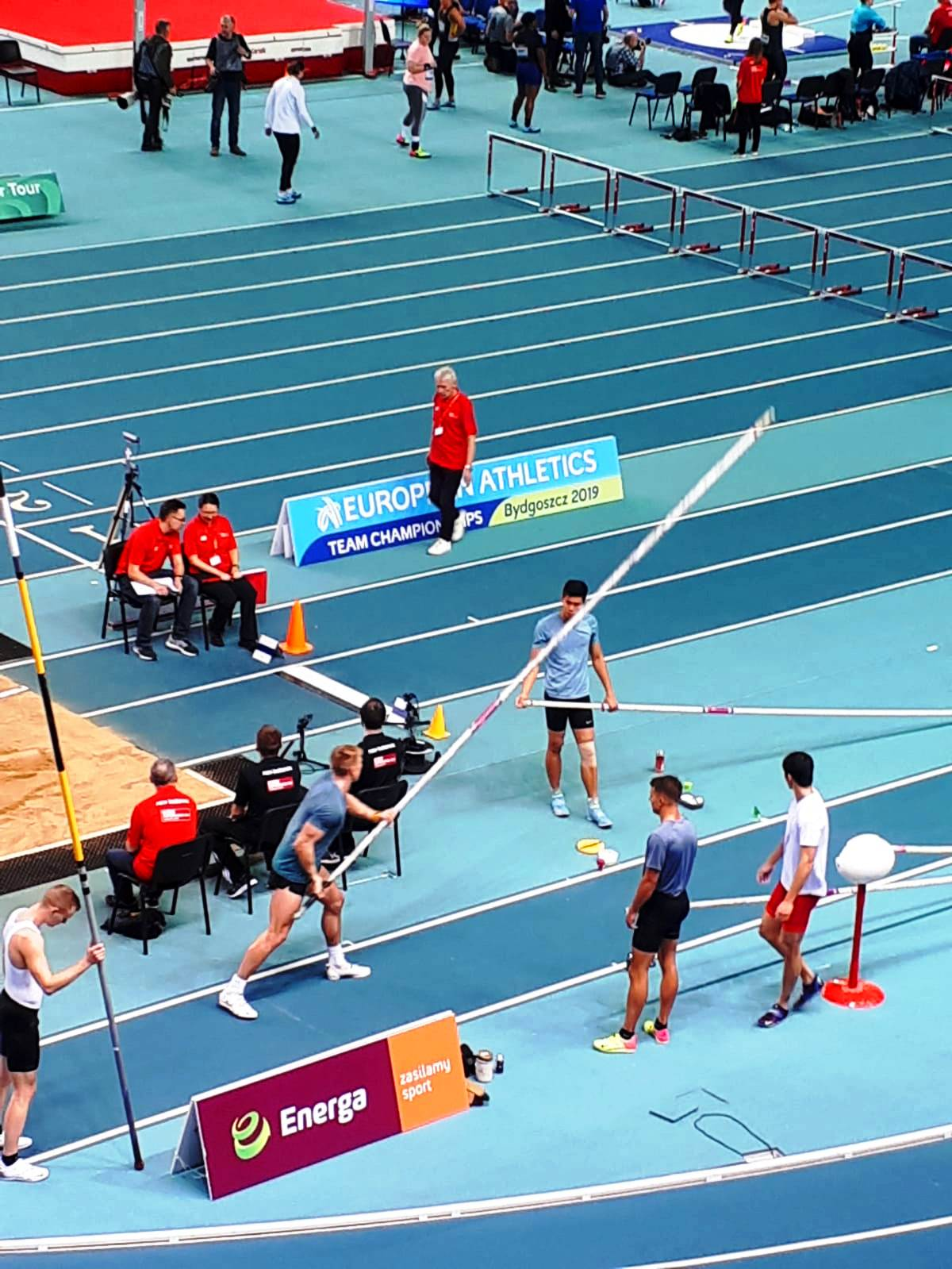
Copernicus Cup in 2019

=== Men ===
Men's meeting records of the Copernicus Cup
Event	Record	Athlete	Nationality	Date	Meet	Ref.
60 m	6.46	Ronnie Baker	United States	10 February 2017	2017	
400 m	45.59	Bralon Taplin	Grenada	10 February 2017	2017	
800 m	1:43.63	Elliot Giles	Great Britain	17 February 2021	2021	
1500 m	3:32.56	Azeddine Habz	France	22 February 2026	2026	
3000 m	7:25.82	Selemon Barega	Ethiopia	6 February 2024	2024	
60 m hurdles	7.38	Grant Holloway	United States	17 February 2021	2021	
High jump	2.34 m	Maksim Nedasekau	Belarus	17 February 2021	2021	
High jump	2.34 m	Andriy Protsenko	Ukraine	17 February 2021	2021	
High jump	2.34 m	Gianmarco Tamberi	Italy	17 February 2021	2021	
Pole vault	6.17 m	Armand Duplantis	Sweden	8 February 2020	2020	
Long jump	8.40 m	Miltiadis Tentoglou	Greece	8 February 2023	2023	
Triple jump	17.61 m	Andy Díaz	Italy	6 February 2024	2024	
Shot put	22.00 m	Konrad Bukowiecki	Poland	15 February 2018	2018	

=== Women ===
Women's meeting records of the Copernicus Cup
Event	Record	Athlete	Nationality	Date	Meet	Ref.
60 m	6.99	Zaynab Dosso	Italy	22 February 2026	2026	
400 m	50.44	Henriette Jæger	Norway	16 February 2025	2025	
800 m	1:57.86	Habitam Alemu	Ethiopia	6 February 2024	2024	
1500 m	3:53.92	Gudaf Tsegay	Ethiopia	16 February 2025	2025	
Mile	4:16.16	Gudaf Tsegay	Ethiopia	8 February 2023	2023	
3000 m	8:31.24	Lemlem Hailu	Ethiopia	17 February 2021	2021	
60 m hurdles	7.77	Devynne Charlton	Bahamas	22 February 2026	2026	
High jump	2.00 m	Mariya Lasitskene	Russia	15 February 2018	2018	
Pole vault	4.60 m	Nicole Büchler	Switzerland	10 February 2017	2017	
Long jump	6.96 m	Maryna Bekh-Romanchuk	Ukraine	8 February 2020	2020	
Triple jump	14.60 m	Paraskevi Papahristou	Greece	17 February 2021	2021	
Shot put	20.24 m	Chase Jackson	United States	16 February 2025	2025	

== See also ==
- Sport in Poland
