= Dm-Arena =

Multi-purpose hall near Karlsruhe, Germany

Coordinates: 48°58′48″N 8°19′44″E

Dm-Arena is a multi-purpose hall in Rheinstetten near Karlsruhe, Germany. The indoor arena is one of four exhibition halls of the Karlsruhe Trade Fair Centre (Messe Karlsruhe). It opened in 2003 and holds 14,000 people. It hosts mainly trade shows and indoor sporting events like the Indoor Meeting Karlsruhe. While the Karlsruhe Trade Fair Centre is operated by a municipal company, the Dm-Arena carries the name of the sponsor dm-drogerie markt, a chain of retail stores headquartered in Karlsruhe.

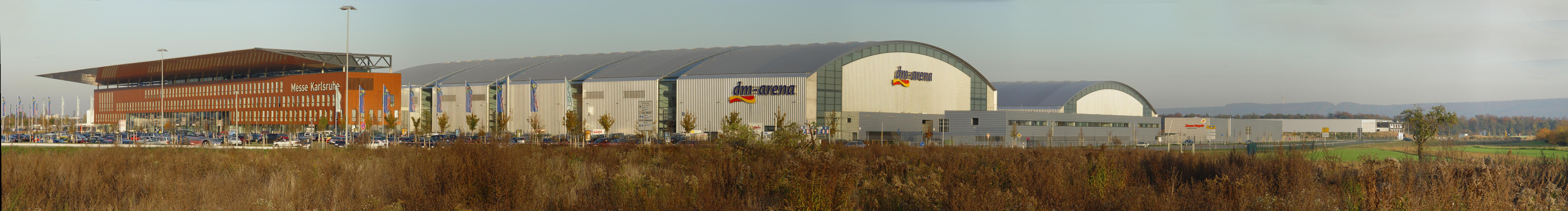
The Karlsruhe Trade Fair Centre (Messe Karlsruhe) with the DM-Arena (center)
