= Burundi at the World Athletics Championships =

- Flag of Burundi
- WA code: BDI
- Medals: Gold 0 Silver 2 Bronze 1 Total 3

World Athletics Championships appearances (overview)
- 1983; 1987; 1991; 1993; 1995; 1997; 1999; 2001; 2003; 2005; 2007; 2009; 2011; 2013; 2015; 2017; 2019; 2022; 2023; 2025

Burundi has competed in every edition of the World Athletics Championships since its beginning in 1983. As of 2025, they stood on the podium for 3 times. Arthémon Hatungimana was their first medalist, after placing second in the men's 800 metres event in 1995, the same competition where his colleague and future olympic champion Vénuste Niyongabo came third in the men's 1500 metres final some days later. Twenty-two years later, Francine Niyonsaba finished second in the women's 800 metres final at the 2017 World Championships in Athletics.

== Medalists ==
Medal	Name	Year	Event
Silver	Arthémon Hatungimana	1995 Gothenburg	Men's 800 metres
Bronze	Vénuste Niyongabo	1995 Gothenburg	Men's 1500 metres
Silver	Francine Niyonsaba	2017 London	Women's 800 metres

=== By event ===
Event	Gold	Silver	Bronze	Total
800 metres	0	2	0	2
1500 metres	0	0	1	1
Totals (2 entries)	0	2	1	3

=== By gender ===
Gender	Gold	Silver	Bronze	Total
Men	0	1	1	2
Women	0	1	0	1

== See also ==
- Burundi at the Olympics
- Burundi at the Paralympics
