= Georgia at the 2018 European Athletics Championships =

- WA code: GEO
- National federation: AFG
- Website: www.sul.fi

in Berlin
- Competitors: 3
- Medals: Gold 0 Silver 0 Bronze 0 Total 0

European Athletics Championships appearances
- 1994; 1998; 2002; 2006; 2010; 2012; 2014; 2016; 2018; 2022; 2024; 2026

Other related appearances
- Soviet Union (1946–1990)

Georgia competed at the 2018 European Athletics Championships in Berlin, Germany, from 6–12 August 2018. A delegation of 3 athletes were sent to represent the country.

The following athletes were selected to compete by the Athletic Federation of Georgia.

Men
Track and road

Athletes	Event	Heats		Semifinal		Final	
Athletes	Event	Result	Rank	Result	Rank	Result	Rank
Daviti Kharazishvili	Marathon	—N/a				DNF	DNF

Field events

Athletes	Event	Qualification		Final	
Athletes	Event	Distance	Position	Distance	Position
Lasha Gulelauri	Triple jump	NM	NM	did not advance	
Giorgi Mujaridze	Shot put	19.18 m	24	did not advance	
