= Burundi at the 2025 World Aquatics Championships =

- Flag of Burundi
- World Aquatics code: BDI
- National federation: Burundi Swimming Federation

in Singapore
- Competitors: 2 in 1 sport
- Medals: Gold 0 Silver 0 Bronze 0 Total 0

World Aquatics Championships appearances
- 1973; 1975; 1978; 1982; 1986; 1991; 1994; 1998; 2001; 2003; 2005; 2007; 2009; 2011; 2013; 2015; 2017; 2019; 2022; 2023; 2024; 2025

Burundi is competing at the 2025 World Aquatics Championships in Singapore from 11 July to 3 August 2025.

== Competitors ==
The following is the list of competitors in the Championships.

Sport	Men	Women	Total
Swimming	1	1	2
Total	1	1	2

== Swimming ==
Men

Athlete	Event	Heat		Semifinal		Final	
Athlete	Event	Time	Rank	Time	Rank	Time	Rank
Belly-Cresus Ganira	50 m freestyle	23.99	72	Did not advance			
Belly-Cresus Ganira	50 m butterfly	26.03	74	Did not advance			

Women

Athlete	Event	Heat		Semifinal		Final	
Athlete	Event	Time	Rank	Time	Rank	Time	Rank
Lois Eliora Irishura	50 m freestyle	29.14	75	Did not advance			
Lois Eliora Irishura	50 m backstroke	34.49	61	Did not advance			
