= List of Georgian records in athletics =

The following are the national records in athletics in Georgia maintained by the Athletic Federation of Georgia.

== Outdoor ==
Key to tables: Awaiting ratification Record not kept by Athletics Federation of Georgia Not ratified or later rescinded by Athletics Federation of Georgia

=== Men ===
| Event | Record | Athlete | Date | Meet | Place | Ref. |
|---|---|---|---|---|---|---|
| 100 m | 10.35 (+1.5 m/s) | Besik Gotsiridze | 22 May 1987 | | Tsaghkadzor, Soviet Union | |
| 200 m | 20.59 (−1.1 m/s) | Besik Gotsiridze | 15 August 1987 | | Moscow, Soviet Union | |
| 400 m | 45.86 | Alif Aliyev | 28 August 1983 | | Kiev, Soviet Union | |
| 800 m | 1:49.6 h | Anatoliy Nekrasov | 14 July 1979 | | Tbilisi, Soviet Union | |
| 1500 m | 3:42.4 h | Mikhail Shapovalov | 28 July 1979 | | Moscow, Soviet Union | |
| 3000 m | 7:56.10 | Oleg Strizhakov | 9 June 1984 | | Sochi, Soviet Union | |
| 5000 m | 13:30.88 | Oleg Strizhakov | 23 June 1984 | | Kiev, Soviet Union | |
| 10,000 m | 28:16.15 | Oleg Strizhakov | 25 July 1990 | Goodwill Games | Seattle, United States | |
| Half marathon | 1:01:31 | Oleg Strizhakov | 4 October 1992 | | Montbéliard, France | |
| 25 km (road) | 1:20:05+ | Daviti Kharazishvili | 27 September 2015 | Berlin Marathon | Berlin, Germany | |
| 30 km (road) | 1:36:03+ | Daviti Kharazishvili | 27 September 2015 | Berlin Marathon | Berlin, Germany | |
| Marathon | 2:15:10 | Daviti Kharazishvili | 15 May 2022 | Copenhagen Marathon | Copenhagen, Denmark | |
| 110 m hurdles | 13.58 (+1.8 m/s) | David Ilariani | 15 June 2012 | | Sliven, Bulgaria | |
| 400 m hurdles | 51.40 | Arkadiy Bronnikov | 18 May 1986 | | Sochi, Soviet Union | |
| 3000 m steeplechase | 8:28.0 h | Sergey Skripka | 11 June 1977 | | Moscow, Soviet Union | |
| High jump | 2.26 m | Zurab Gogochuri | 16 June 2012 | | Tbilisi, Georgia | |
| Pole vault | 5.30 m | Sergey Amosov | 17 July 1983 | | Kharkiv, Soviet Union | |
| Long jump | 8.24 m (+1.3 m/s) | Bachana Khorava | 29 May 2021 | Georgian Championships | Tbilisi, Georgia | |
| Triple jump | 17.44 m (−1.0 m/s) | Viktor Saneyev | 17 October 1972 | | Sukhumi, Soviet Union | |
| Shot put | 21.17 m | Mujaridze Giorgi | 21 May 2022 | | Tbilisi, Georgia | |
| Discus throw | 63.10 m | Guram Gudashvili | 1 September 1968 | | Tbilisi, Soviet Union | |
| Hammer throw | 78.12 m | Iosif Shaverdashvili | 29 September 1991 | | Tbilisi, Georgia | |
| Javelin throw | 75.48 m | Ambrosi Matiashvili | 18 July 1990 | | Moscow, Soviet Union | |
| Decathlon | 7756 pts h | Yuriy Dyachkov | 15–16 June 1968 | | Tbilisi, Soviet Union | |
| Decathlon | 100m / Long jump / Shot put / High jump / 400m / 110m H / Discus / Pole vault / Javelin / 1500m; 10.8 / 7.40 m / 15.70 m / 1.80 m / 51.2 / 14.6 / 47.20 m / 4.40 m / 59.40 m / 4:46.6 | | | | | |
| 20 km walk (road) | 1:26:23 | Maciej Rosiewicz | 20 April 2013 | | Zaniemyśl, Poland | |
| 50 km walk (road) | 3:57:28 (Note: probably short course and downhill) | Aleksandr Shcherbina | 17 October 1965 | | Alma Ata, Soviet Union | |
| 4 × 100 m relay | 40.40 | Georgian SSR; G. Bagashvili; T. Chitadze; B. Mekvabishili; V. Ivanov | 29 July 1979 | | Moscow, Soviet Union | |
| 4 × 400 m relay | 3:10.8 h | Georgian SSR; S. Sarkisyan; A. Andreyev; T. Bakhtadze; Y. Kozelskiy | 22 August 1967 | | Tashkent, Soviet Union | |

=== Women ===
| Event | Record | Athlete | Date | Meet | Place | Ref. |
|---|---|---|---|---|---|---|
| 100 m | 11.08 (±0.0 m/s) | Maia Azarashvili | 14 August 1988 | | Kiev, Soviet Union | |
| 200 m | 22.24 (+0.1 m/s) | Maia Azarashvili | 16 August 1988 | | Kiev, Soviet Union | |
| 400 m | 52.13 | Maia Azarashvili | 11 June 1988 | Brothers Znamensky Memorial | Leningrad, Soviet Union | |
| 800 m | 2:05.8 h | Yelena Shapovalova | 12 May 1983 | | Tbilisi, Soviet Union | |
| 1500 m | 4:13.84 | Yelena Shapovalova | 11 June 1983 | Brothers Znamensky Memorial | Moscow, Soviet Union | |
| 3000 m | 9:06.64 | Yelena Shapovalova | 18 June 1983 | | Moscow, Soviet Union | |
| 5000 m | 15:32.02 | Valeriya Zhandarova | 2 August 2022 | Russian Championships | Cheboksary, Russia | |
| 10,000 m | 33:16.91 | Valeriya Zhandarova | 6 August 2023 | Russian Championships | Chelyabinsk, Russia | |
| Half marathon | 1:14:14 | Valeriya Zhandarova | 13 October 2019 | Cracovia Half Marathon | Kraków, Poland | |
| Marathon | | | | | | |
| 100 m hurdles | 14.47 | Tamara Kidiashvili | 25 July 1979 | | Moscow, Soviet Union | |
| 400 m hurdles | 58.20 | Zhorena Onyashvili | 11 June 1983 | | Moscow, Soviet Union | |
| 3000 m steeplechase | 10:13.69 | Valeriya Zhandarova | 24 July 2019 | Motonet GP | Joensuu, Finland | |
| High jump | 1.92 m | Valentyna Liashenko | 27 June 2015 | | Berdychiv, Ukraine | |
| Pole vault | 3.10 m | Diana Zolothukina | 29 July 2015 | | Tbilisi, Georgia | |
| Long jump | 6.25 m | Nadezhda Dvalishvili | 16 May 1954 | | Tbilisi, Soviet Union | |
| Long jump | 6.25 m | Liudmila Ievleva | 26 July 1960 | | Kharkiv, Soviet Union | |
| Long jump | 6.67 m # (Note: questionable) | Maiko Gogoladze | 12 May 2012 | | Sofia, Bulgaria | |
| Triple jump | 13.68 m (+0.2 m/s) | Yuliya Dubina | 14 July 2006 | | Kutaisi, Georgia | |
| Triple jump | 14.03 m (+1.5 m/s) # | Yuliya Dubina | 2 July 2004 | | Baku, Azerbaijan | |
| Shot put | 19.30 m | Aleksandra Abashidze | 9 June 1984 | Brothers Znamensky Memorial | Sochi, Soviet Union | |
| Discus throw | 64.20 m | Natella Labadze | 8 September 1980 | | Dnepropetrovsk, Soviet Union | |
| Hammer throw | 62.16 m | Nino Tsikvadze | 15 July 2019 | | Tbilisi, Georgia (Note: by World Athletics source; Belarus by federation source) | |
| Javelin throw | 51.91 m | Maka Obolashvili | 8 July 2000 | European Cup (2nd League) | Banská Bystrica, Slovakia | |
| Heptathlon | 5483 pts h | Olga Vershinina | 15–16 May 1983 | | Tbilisi, Soviet Union | |
| Heptathlon | 100m H / High jump / Shot put / 200m / Long jump / Javelin / 800m; 14.5 / 1.76 m / 12.70 m / 25.7 / 6.01 m / 31.00 m / 2:20.2 | | | | | |
| 20 km walk (road) | | | | | | |
| 50 km walk (road) | | | | | | |
| 4 × 100 m relay | 44.90 | Georgian SSR; M. Aptsiauri; Y. Golutvina; Tamara Shanidze; Maia Azarashvili | 16 September 1986 | Spartakiad | Tashkent, Soviet Union | |
| 4 × 400 m relay | 3:39.4 h | Georgian SSR; Maia Azarashvili; O. Mikhelidse; L. Abramova; Zhorena Onyashvili | 29 May 1983 | | Tbilisi, Soviet Union | |

=== Mixed ===
| Event | Record | Athlete | Date | Meet | Place | Ref. |
|---|---|---|---|---|---|---|
| 4 × 400 m relay | 3:36.62 | Georgia; Luka Kuphunia; Ani Mamatsashvili; Mindia Endeladze; Ana Sokhadze | 22 June 2023 | European Team Championships | Chorzów, Poland | |

== Indoor ==
=== Men ===
| Event | Record | Athlete | Date | Meet | Place | Ref. |
|---|---|---|---|---|---|---|
| 60 m | 6.71 | Besik Gotsiridze | 5 February 1986 | | Moscow, Soviet Union | |
| 200 m | 21.13 | Besik Gotsiridze | 11 February 1988 | | Volgograd, Soviet Union | |
| 400 m | 47.26 | Mindia Endeladze | 14 February 2021 | | Istanbul, Turkey | |
| 800 m | 1:52.94 | Vladimir Baldin | 11 February 1988 | | Volgograd, Soviet Union | |
| 1500 m | 3:50.82 | Oleg Khokhlov | 11 February 1989 | | Panevėžys, Soviet Union | |
| Mile | 4:16.08 OT | Saba Khvichava | 20 January 2023 | Prairie Wolf Invitational | Lincoln, United States | |
| Mile | 4:13.89 OT | Saba Khvichava | 3 February 2023 | 47th Annual Frank Sevigne Husker Invitational | Lincoln, United States | |
| 3000 m | 8:05.03 (Note: by World Athletics source, 8:50.03 by federation source) | Oleg Strizhakov | 4 March 1990 | | Chelyabinsk, Soviet Union | |
| 3000 m | 8:25.79 | Daviti Kharazishvili | 16 February 2019 | Balkan Championships | Istanbul, Turkey | |
| 60 m hurdles | 7.66 | Anatoliy Moshiashvili | 10 March 1974 | European Championships | Gothenburg, Sweden | |
| High jump | 2.17 m | Zurab Gogochuri | 27 February 2016 | Balkan Championships | Istanbul, Turkey | |
| Pole vault | 4.90 m | Gocha Chetkoshvili | 10 February 1981 | | Tbilisi, Soviet Union | |
| Long jump | 8.25 m (Note: outdoor mark ratified as absolute record) | Bachana Khorava | 7 February 2016 | Georgian Winter Championships | Tbilisi, Georgia | |
| Triple jump | 17.16 m | Viktor Saneyev | 2 February 1976 (Note: by World Athletics source; 2 February 1979 by federation source) | | Moscow, Soviet Union | |
| Triple jump | 17.16 m (Note: not ratified by national federation but recognized by World Athletics) | Lasha Torgvaidze | 2 February 2020 | | Tbilisi, Georgia | |
| Shot put | 21.21 m | Giorgi Mujaridze | 8 February 2020 | | Tbilisi, Georgia | |
| Heptathlon | | | | | | |
| Heptathlon | 60m / Long jump / Shot put / High jump / 60m H / Pole vault / 1000m | | | | | |
| 5000 m walk | 22:58.06 | Elmar Urushadze | 14 January 2000 | | Tbilisi, Georgia | |
| 4 × 400 m relay | | | | | | |

=== Women ===
| Event | Record | Athlete | Date | Meet | Place | Ref. |
|---|---|---|---|---|---|---|
| 60 m | 7.27 | Maia Azarashvili | 11 February 1994 | | Mannheim, Germany | |
| 200 m | 23.07 | Maia Azarashvili | 5 February 1995 | Sparkassen Cup | Stuttgart, Germany | |
| 400 m | 54.53 | Maia Azarashvili | 17 February 1988 | | Valencia, Spain | |
| 800 m | 2:12.8 h | Laila Tzintzalashvili | 27 January 1979 | | Kharkiv, Soviet Union | |
| 1500 m | 4:37.6 h | Laila Tzintzalashvili | 28 January 1979 | | Kharkiv, Soviet Union | |
| 3000 m | 8:55.04 | Tatyana Sychova | 19 February 1982 | | Moscow, Soviet Union | |
| 5000 m | 16:25.22 | Valeriya Zhandarova | 2 March 2025 | Russian Championships | Moscow, Russia | |
| 60 m hurdles | 8.21 | Olga Vershinina | 6 March 1982 | | Ordzhonikidze, Soviet Union | |
| High jump | 1.86 m | Valentyna Liashenko | 17 January 2015 | Demyanyuk Memorial | Lviv, Ukraine | |
| Pole vault | 3.10 m (Note: outdoor mark set as absolute record) | Diana Zolotukhina | 8 February 2015 | Georgian Winter Championships | Tbilisi, Georgia | |
| Long jump | 6.21 m | Julia Dubina | 8 February 2005 | | Tehran, Iran | |
| Triple jump | 13.24 m (Note: by World Athletics source; 13.41 m by federation source) | Julia Dubina | 9 February 2005 | | Tehran, Iran | |
| Shot put | 18.59 m | Mariam Kevkhishvili | 13 March 2010 | NCAA Division I Championships | Fayetteville, United States | |
| Shot put | 19.18 m | Aleksandra Abashidze | 18 February 1983 | | Moscow, Soviet Union | |
| Pentathlon | | | | | | |
| Pentathlon | 60m H / High jump / Shot put / Long jump / 800m | | | | | |
| 3000 m walk | | | | | | |
| 4 × 400 m relay | | | | | | |
