= Lemlem Hailu =

Ethiopian middle-distance runner

Personal information
- Full name: Lemlem Hailu Techane
- Nationality: Ethiopian
- Born: 25 May 2001 (age 25)

Sport
- Country: Ethiopia
- Sport: Athletics
- Events: Middle-, Long-distance running

Achievements and titles
- Personal bests: 1500 m: 4:00.32 (Castellón 2022); 3000 m: 8:34.03 (Doha 2019); 5000 m: 14:34.54 (Paris 2023); Indoors; 1500 m: 4:01.57i WU20R (Liévin 2020); 3000 m: 8:29.28i (Madrid 2021)
Medal record
Women's athletics
Representing Ethiopia
World Indoor Championships
Gold medal – first place	2022 Belgrade	3000 m
African Games
Bronze medal – third place	2019 Rabat	1500 m
Youth Olympic Games
Bronze medal – third place	2018 Buenos Aires	1500 m + XC
World Youth Championships
Gold medal – first place	2017 Nairobi	1500 m
African Youth Games
Gold medal – first place	2018 Algiers	1500 m

Lemlem Hailu (Amharic: ለምለም ኃይሉ; born 25 May 2001) is an Ethiopian middle- and long-distance runner. She won the gold medal in the 3000 metres at the 2022 World Indoor Championships. Lemlem earned bronze in the 1500 metres at the 2019 African Games.

At age 16, she was the 1500 m 2017 World Youth champion to take a bronze in the event at the Youth Olympic Games a year later. She represented Ethiopia in the women's 1500 m at the 2019 World Championships and 2020 Tokyo Olympics. Lemlem holds the world junior indoor record in the event.

== Career ==
At age 16, Lemlem Hailu gained first international experience at the 2017 World Youth Championships in Nairobi, where she won the 1500 metres event. A year later, she took gold over the distance at the African Youth Games held in Algiers and went to Argentina for Youth Olympic Games in Buenos Aires, where she earned bronze in a combined 1500m event.

In 2019, she captured the bronze medal for the 1500m at the African Games. Lemlem represented Ethiopia in the event at the 2019 World Championships in Doha, reaching the semi-finals.

In February 2020, she set a world under-20 record for the indoor 1500 metres with a time of 4:01.79, breaking by 0.02 s previous mark set by her compatriot Gudaf Tsegay in 2016. The same month, Lemlem improved her record to 4m 1.57s, which was her fourth personal best achieved within three weeks. In October, she won the 1500m race at the Kip Keino Classic.

In 2021, Lemlem secured an overall 3000m World Indoor Tour victory, winning two top-level meets. She won the event at the Meeting Hauts-de-France Pas-de-Calais in Liévin, and the Copernicus Cup in Toruń. At the delayed 2020 Tokyo Olympics, Lemlem was eliminated in the semi-finals of the 1500m event.

The next year, Lemlem became the 3000m World indoor champion in Belgrade with a season's best of 8:41.82. Elle Purrier St. Pierre won silver in 8:42.04 while Lemlem's compatriot Ejgayehu Taye was third in 8:42.23.

== Achievements ==
=== International competitions ===
Representing Ethiopia
Year	Competition	Venue	Position	Event	Result
2017	World Youth Championships	Nairobi, Kenya	1st	1500 m	4:20.80
2018	African Youth Games	Algiers, Algeria	1st	1500 m	4:36.71
2018	Youth Olympic Games	Buenos Aires, Argentina	3rd	1500 m + XC	7 pts
2019	African Games	Rabat, Morocco	3rd	1500 m	4:20.60
2019	World Championships	Doha, Qatar	18th (sf)	1500 m	4:16.56
2021	Olympic Games	Tokyo, Japan	18th (sf)	1500 m	4:03.76
2022	World Indoor Championships	Belgrade, Serbia	1st	3000 m i	8:41.82 SB
2023	World Championships	Budapest, Hungary	17th	10,000 m	32:42.78
2024	World Indoor Championships	Glasgow, United Kingdom	6th	3000 m	8:30.36

=== Circuit wins, and National titles ===
- World Athletics Indoor Tour 3000 m overall winner: 2021, 2023
  - 2021 (3000 m): Liévin Meeting Hauts-de-France Pas-de-Calais, Toruń Copernicus Cup
  - 2023 (3000 m): Karlsruhe Init Indoor Meeting
- World Athletics Continental Tour
  - 2020 (1500 m): Nairobi Kip Keino Classic
- Ethiopian Athletics Championships
  - 1500 metres: 2019, 2021

=== Personal bests ===
- 1500 metres – 4:00.32 (Castellón 2022)
  - 1500 metres indoor – 4:01.57 (Liévin 2020) World U20 record
- 3000 metres – 8:34.03 (Doha 2019)
  - 3000 metres indoor – 8:29.28 (Madrid 2021)
- 5000 metres – 14:34.54 (Paris 2023)

Road

- Half marathon – 1:08:50 (New Delhi 2022)
