= Burundi at the 2023 World Athletics Championships =

- Flag of Burundi
- WA code: BDI

in Budapest, Hungary 19 August 2023 – 27 August 2023
- Competitors: 6 (4 men and 2 women)
- Medals: Gold 0 Silver 0 Bronze 0 Total 0

World Athletics Championships appearances
- 1983; 1987; 1991; 1993; 1995; 1997; 1999; 2001; 2003; 2005; 2007; 2009; 2011; 2013; 2015; 2017; 2019; 2022; 2023

Burundi competed at the 2023 World Athletics Championships in Budapest, Hungary, from 19 to 27 August 2023.

== Results ==
Burundi entered 6 athletes.

Key

- Q = Qualified for the next round
- q = Qualified for the next round as a fastest loser or, in field events, by position without achieving the qualifying target
- NR = National record
- PB = Personal best
- SB = Season best
- N/A = Round not applicable for the event

=== Men ===
Track and road events

Athlete	Event	Heat		Final	
Athlete	Event	Result	Rank	Result	Rank
Rodrigue Kwizera	5000 metres	13:35.81	10	Did not advance	
Rodrigue Kwizera	10,000 metres	—		28:00.29 SB	7
Egide Ntakarutimana	5000 metres	13:37.53	10	Did not advance	
Olivier Irabaruta	Marathon	—		DNF	
Onesphore Nzikwinkunda	Marathon	—		2:18:27	43

=== Women ===
Track and road events

Athlete	Event	Heats		Final	
Athlete	Event	Result	Rank	Result	Rank
Francine Niyomukunzi	5000 metres	15:05.24	9 Q	15:15.01	15
Cavaline Nahimana	Marathon	—		DNF	
