= Georgia at the 2017 World Championships in Athletics =

- Flag of Georgia
- WA code: GEO
- National federation: Athletic Federation of Georgia
- Website: geoathletics.ge (in Georgian)

in London, United Kingdom 4–13 August 2017
- Competitors: 1 (1 man) in 1 event
- Medals: Gold 0 Silver 0 Bronze 0 Total 0

World Championships in Athletics appearances
- 1993; 1995; 1997; 1999; 2001; 2003; 2005; 2007; 2009; 2011; 2013; 2015; 2017; 2019; 2022; 2023; 2025

Georgia competed at the 2017 World Championships in Athletics in London, Great Britain, from 4–13 August 2017.

== Results ==
Georgia entered one male athlete.

=== Men ===
Track and road events

Athlete	Event	Final	
Athlete	Event	Result	Rank
Daviti Kharazishvili	Marathon	2:24.24	56
