= Burundi at the 2019 African Games =

- Flag of Burundi
- IOC code: BDI
- NOC: Comité National Olympique du Burundi

in Rabat, Morocco 19 August 2019 – 31 August 2019
- Competitors: 54 (44 men and 10 women) in 9 sports
- Medals: Gold 0 Silver 0 Bronze 0 Total 0

African Games appearances
- 1987; 1991; 1995; 1999–2007; 2011; 2015; 2019; 2023

Burundi competed at the 2019 African Games held from 19 to 31 August 2019 in Rabat, Morocco.

== Athletics ==
Onesphore Nzikwinkunda finished in 6th place in the men's 10,000 metres event.

Rodrigue Kwizera competed in the men's 5000 metres and he finished in 16th place. Cavaline Nahimana competed in the women's 5000 metres event and she finished in 8th place.

Patrick Nibafasha competed in the men's 1500 metres but did not qualify to compete in the final. Violette Ndayikengurukiye competed in the women's 800 metres event and also did not qualify to compete in the final.

Two athletes represented Burundi in the men's 800 metres: Eric Nzikwinkunda and Prosper Niyonkuru. Niyonkuru did not advance to the semifinals and Nzikwinkunda finished in 11th place in the semifinals.

== Cycling ==
Leonidas Ahishakiye, Mussa Amissi and Amadi Uwimana competed in road cycling.

== Football ==
Burundi's national under-20 football team competed at the 2019 African Games. The team lost all three matches in the men's tournament and did not advance to the semi-finals.

== Judo ==
Six athletes represented Burundi in judo: Claude Hakizimana, Signoline Kanyamuneza, Samuel Kwitonda, Fabrice Kwizera, Donatien Nduwimana and Ange Ciella Niragira.

== Karate ==
Elvis Terimbere (men's Kumite -60kg) competed in karate.

== Swimming ==
Belly Crésus Ganira, Billy-Scott Irakose and Odrina Kaze competed in swimming.

== Tennis ==
Burundi competed in tennis.

== Wrestling ==
Claude Ndayizeye and Rachelle Niyomukiza were scheduled to compete in wrestling but they did not compete in their events.
