= Ejgayehu Taye =

Ethiopian athlete

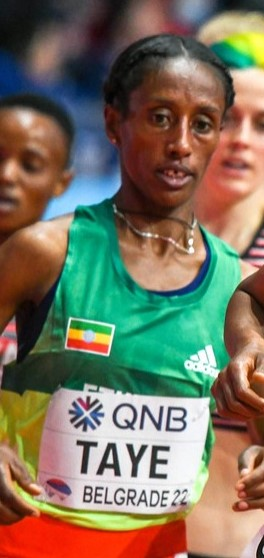
- Taye in 2022

Personal information
- Nationality: Ethiopian
- Born: 10 February 2000 (age 26) Mendida, Oromia, Ethiopia

Sport
- Country: Ethiopia
- Sport: Track and Field
- Event: Long-distance running

Achievements and titles
- Personal bests: 3000 m: 8:19.52 NR (Paris 2021); Road; 5 km: 14:19 Mx (Barcelona 2021)
Medal record
Women's athletics
Representing Ethiopia
World Championships
Bronze medal – third place	2023 Budapest	10,000 m
World Indoor Championships
Bronze medal – third place	2022 Belgrade	3000 m
World Road Running Championships
Bronze medal – third place	2023 Riga	5K
World U20 Championships
Silver medal – second place	2018 Tampere	3000 m

Ejgayehu Taye (born 10 February 2000) is an Ethiopian Olympic long-distance runner. She won the bronze medal for the 3000 metres at the 2022 World Indoor Championships. She also held the mixed world record 5 km road race from 2021 to 2024, with a time of 14:19.

== Career ==
In July 2018, Ejgayehu Taye won the silver medal in the 5000 metres at the 2018 IAAF World U20 Championships in Tampere behind Beatrice Chebet and ahead of Taye's compatriot Tsigie Gebreselama.

She placed fifth over the 5000m at the 2019 African Games.

In June 2021, she set a new personal best of 14:14.09 in her specialist event as she finished second in the Ethiopian Olympic trials behind Gudaf Tsegay and ahead of Senbere Teferi to secure her place for the delayed 2020 Tokyo Olympics. At the Games, Taye placed fifth in the women's 5000m final.

On 31 December 2021, in her second road race as a professional, Taye set a world record in the 5 km run at the Cursa dels Nassos 5K in Barcelona (mixed race) in a time of 14 minutes 19 seconds, improving previous mark by 20 seconds. She had 45 second margin of victory. Taye's record has since been broken by Agnes Ngetich, who split 14:13 en route to 10 km at the 2024 10K Valencia.

She won the bronze medal in the 3000 metres at the 2022 World Indoor Championships in Belgrade with a time of 8:42.23. Her compatriot Lemlem Hailu took gold in 8:41.82 while second-placed Elle Purrier St. Pierre clocked 8:42.04. Taye ran 14:21 at the Cursa dels Nassos 5K on New Year's Eve trying to improve her own world record, the second-fastest mark in history.

She won a bronze medal in the 10,000 metres at the 2023 World Athletics Championships in Budapest.

In May 2024, she finished second in the 5000 metres at the 2024 Doha Diamond League. She competed in the 5000 metres at the 2024 Summer Olympics in Paris in August 2024, placing sixth in the final.

On 4 April 2025, she won the opening Long Distance race of Grand Slam Track in Kingston, Jamaica, running the 3000 metres in 8:28.42, the fastest time ever run by a woman for the distance in Jamaica, to out-pace Kenyan Agnes Ngetich on the last-lap. On 6 April 2025, she also won the 5000 metres race at the event, finishing ahead of Ngetich in a time of 14:54.88. She was runner-up in the long distance category at the 2025 Philadelphia Slam.

In September 2025, she competed over 10,000 metres at the 2025 World Championships in Tokyo, Japan, placing fifth.

== Statistics ==
=== International competitions ===
Representing Ethiopia
Year	Competition	Venue	Position	Event	Notes
2018	World Junior Championships	Tampere, Finland	2nd	5000 m	15:30.87 PB
2019	African Games	Rabat, Morocco	5th	5000 m	15:39.94
2021	Olympic Games	Tokio, Japan	5th	5000 m	14:41.24
2022	World Indoor Championships	Belgrade, Serbia	3rd	3000 m i	8:42.23
2022	World Championships	Eugene, United States	6th	10,000 m	30:12.45 PB
2023	World Championships	Budapest, Hungary	5th	5000 m	14:56.85
2023	World Championships	Budapest, Hungary	3rd	10,000 m	31:28.31
2024	Olympic Games	Paris, France	6th	5000 m	14:32.98
2025	World Championships	Tokyo, Japan	5th	10,000 m	30:55.52

=== Circuit performances ===
Grand Slam Track results
Slam	Race group	Event	Pl.	Time	Prize money
2025 Kingston Slam	Long distance	3000 m	1st	8:28.42	US$100,000
2025 Kingston Slam	Long distance	5000 m	1st	14:54.88	US$100,000
2025 Philadelphia Slam	Long distance	3000 m	2nd	8:43.70	US$25,000

==== Wins and titles ====
- Diamond League
  - 2022: Eugene Prefontaine Classic (5000m, WL MR PB)

=== Personal bests ===
- 3000 metres – 8:19.52 (Paris 2021) NR
  - 3000 metres indoor – 8:26.77 (Liévin 2022)
- 5000 metres – 14:12.98 (Eugene, OR 2022)
- 10,000 metres – 30:12.45 (Eugene, OR 2022)

Road

- 5 km – 14:19 (Barcelona 2021) (mixed race)
- 10 km – 33:31 (Saarbrücken 2018)
