= Burundi at the 2017 World Aquatics Championships =

- Flag of Burundi
- World Aquatics code: BDI
- National federation: Burundi Swimming Federation

in Budapest, Hungary
- Competitors: 3 in 1 sport
- Medals: Gold 0 Silver 0 Bronze 0 Total 0

World Aquatics Championships appearances
- 1973; 1975; 1978; 1982; 1986; 1991; 1994; 1998; 2001; 2003; 2005; 2007; 2009; 2011; 2013; 2015; 2017; 2019; 2022; 2023; 2024; 2025

Burundi competed at the 2017 World Aquatics Championships in Budapest, Hungary from 14 July to 30 July.

== Swimming ==
Burundi has received a Universality invitation from FINA to send three swimmers (two men and one woman) to the World Championships.

Athlete	Event	Heat		Semifinal		Final	
Athlete	Event	Time	Rank	Time	Rank	Time	Rank
Belly-Cresus Ganira	Men's 50 m freestyle	25.32	99	Did not advance			
Belly-Cresus Ganira	Men's 50 m butterfly	27.52	72	Did not advance			
Billy-Scott Irakose	Men's 100 m freestyle	56.93	98	Did not advance			
Billy-Scott Irakose	Men's 50 m backstroke	33.14	52	Did not advance			
Lena Irankunda	Women's 50 m freestyle	35.56	84	Did not advance			
Lena Irankunda	Women's 100 m freestyle	DNS		Did not advance			
