= Burundi at the 2024 World Aquatics Championships =

- Flag of Burundi
- World Aquatics code: BDI
- National federation: Burundi Swimming Federation

in Doha, Qatar
- Competitors: 2 in 1 sport
- Medals: Gold 0 Silver 0 Bronze 0 Total 0

World Aquatics Championships appearances
- 1973; 1975; 1978; 1982; 1986; 1991; 1994; 1998; 2001; 2003; 2005; 2007; 2009; 2011; 2013; 2015; 2017; 2019; 2022; 2023; 2024; 2025

Burundi competed at the 2024 World Aquatics Championships in Doha, Qatar from 2 to 18 February.

== Competitors ==
The following is the list of competitors in the Championships.

Sport	Men	Women	Total
Swimming	1	1	2
Total	1	1	2

== Swimming ==
Burundi entered 2 swimmers.

Men

Athlete	Event	Heat		Semifinal		Final	
Athlete	Event	Time	Rank	Time	Rank	Time	Rank
Belly-Cresus Ganira	50 metre freestyle	24.32	69	Did not advance			
Belly-Cresus Ganira	100 metre freestyle	55.29	87	Did not advance			

Women

Athlete	Event	Heat		Semifinal		Final	
Athlete	Event	Time	Rank	Time	Rank	Time	Rank
Lois Eliora Irishura	50 metre freestyle	30.92	89	Did not advance			
Lois Eliora Irishura	100 metre freestyle	1:05.78	71	Did not advance			
