= Burundi at the 2011 World Aquatics Championships =

- Flag of Burundi
- World Aquatics code: BDI
- National federation: Burundi Swimming Federation

in Shanghai, China
- Competitors: 3 in 1 sports
- Medals: Gold 0 Silver 0 Bronze 0 Total 0

World Aquatics Championships appearances
- 1973; 1975; 1978; 1982; 1986; 1991; 1994; 1998; 2001; 2003; 2005; 2007; 2009; 2011; 2013; 2015; 2017; 2019; 2022; 2023; 2024; 2025

Burundi competed at the 2011 World Aquatics Championships in Shanghai, China between July 16 and 31, 2011.

== Swimming ==
Burundi qualified 3 swimmers.

Men

Athlete	Event	Heats		Semifinals		Final	
Athlete	Event	Time	Rank	Time	Rank	Time	Rank
Beni-Bertrand Binobagira	100 m freestyle	1:03.39	98	did not advance			
Beni-Bertrand Binobagira	100 m butterfly	1:19.76	64	did not advance			
Janvier Niyonkuru	100 m freestyle	1:16.00	105	did not advance			
Janvier Niyonkuru	100 m butterfly	1:27.01	65	did not advance			

Women

Athlete	Event	Heats		Semifinals		Final	
Athlete	Event	Time	Rank	Time	Rank	Time	Rank
Elsie Uwamahoro	50 m freestyle	35.11	78	did not advance			
Elsie Uwamahoro	100 m freestyle	1:17.70	76	did not advance			
