= Burundi at the 2023 World Aquatics Championships =

- Flag of Burundi
- FINA code: BDI
- National federation: Fédération Burundaise de Natation

in Fukuoka, Japan
- Competitors: 4 in 1 sport
- Medals: Gold 0 Silver 0 Bronze 0 Total 0

World Aquatics Championships appearances
- 1973; 1975; 1978; 1982; 1986; 1991; 1994; 1998; 2001; 2003; 2005; 2007; 2009; 2011; 2013; 2015; 2017; 2019; 2022; 2023; 2024

Burundi is set to compete at the 2023 World Aquatics Championships in Fukuoka, Japan from 14 to 30 July.

== Swimming ==
Burundi entered 4 swimmers.

Men

Athlete	Event	Heat		Semifinal		Final	
Athlete	Event	Time	Rank	Time	Rank	Time	Rank
Belly-Cresus Ganira	50 metre freestyle	24.39	77	Did not advance			
Belly-Cresus Ganira	100 metre freestyle	54.51	93	Did not advance			
Nicky Irakoze	50 metre butterfly	28.94	79	Did not advance			
Nicky Irakoze	100 metre butterfly	1:05.28	72	Did not advance			

Women

Athlete	Event	Heat		Semifinal		Final	
Athlete	Event	Time	Rank	Time	Rank	Time	Rank
Alia Ishimwe	50 metre freestyle	32.16	93	Did not advance			
Alia Ishimwe	100 metre freestyle	1:13.45	76	Did not advance			
Alyse Maniriho	50 metre butterfly	36.57	60	Did not advance			
Alyse Maniriho	100 metre butterfly	1:29.91	49	Did not advance			
