= 2022 World Athletics Indoor Championships – Women's 3000 metres =

Women's 3000 metres at the 2022 World Athletics Indoor Championships
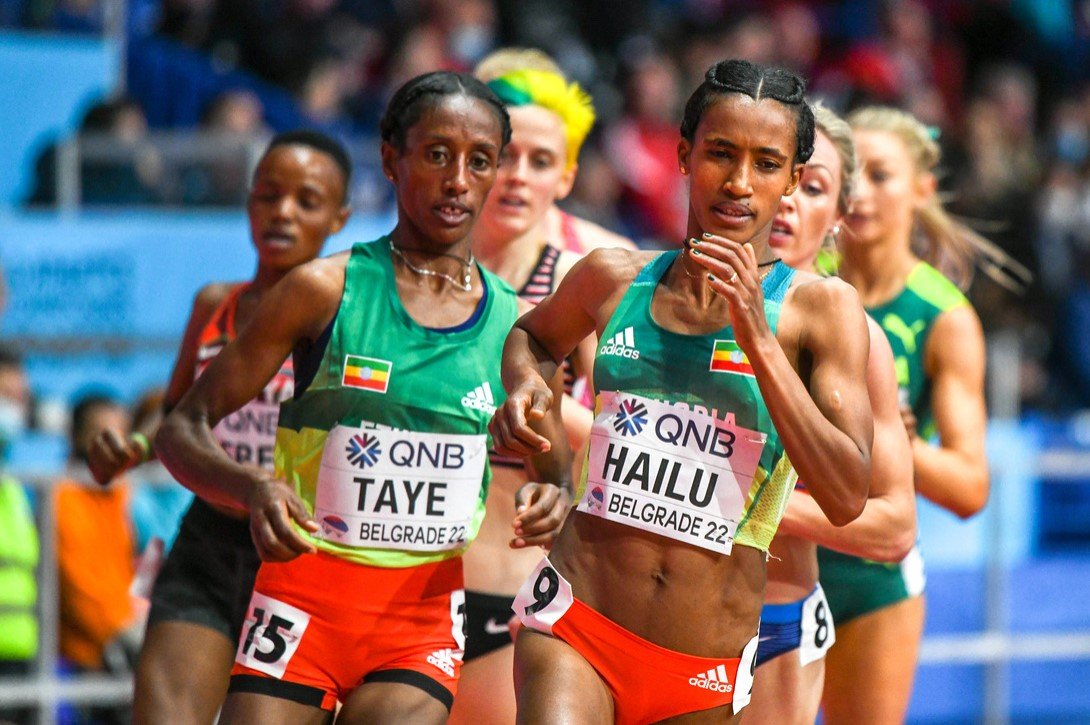
- Venue: Štark Arena
- Dates: 18 March
- Competitors: 20 from 14 nations
- Winning time: 8:41.82

Medalists
gold medal	Lemlem Hailu	Ethiopia
silver medal	Elle Purrier St. Pierre	United States
bronze medal	Ejgayehu Taye	Ethiopia

The women's 3000 metres at the 2022 World Athletics Indoor Championships took place on 18 March 2022.

== Summary ==
Dawit Seyaum came into the race as the world leader and only Meraf Bahta returned from the final 4 years ago.

With nobody aggressively seeking the lead, Gabriela DeBues-Stafford, distinctive in her blue and yellow hair in support of Ukraine in time of war, found herself in front. She held that spot for four laps until Seyaum decided she wanted to up the pace. She was shortly joined by her Ethiopian teammates Ejgayehu Taye and Lemlem Hailu, with Kenyan rival Beatrice Chebet trying to jump into the mix. After a few more laps, Elle Purrier St. Pierre injected herself into the leading group still jockeying, with DeBues-Stafford watching close behind them. With three to go, Hailu hit the lead. As the pace increased, the three Ethiopians, Purrier St. Pierre and DeBues-Stafford became a breakaway. Down the back stretch, it was Purrier St. Pierre speeding past Seyaum and Taye, gaining rapidly on Hailu. Through the final turn, Hailu held off Purrier St. Pierre with Taye having more speed pulling aside Purrier St. Pierre. Coming on to the home stretch, Purrier St. Pierre sped up, stepped in front of Taye and went off in chase of Hailu. Checking over her shoulder, Hailu knew the position of her rivals and maintained her lead to the finish line.

== Results ==
The final was started at 20:25.

Rank	Name	Nationality	Time	Notes
1st place, gold medalist(s)	Lemlem Hailu	Ethiopia	8:41.82	SB
2nd place, silver medalist(s)	Elle Purrier St. Pierre	United States	8:42.04	
3rd place, bronze medalist(s)	Ejgayehu Taye	Ethiopia	8:42.23	
4	Gabriela DeBues-Stafford	Canada	8:42.89	
5	Dawit Seyaum	Ethiopia	8:44.55	
6	Jessica Hull	Australia	8:44.97	
7	Alicia Monson	United States	8:46.39	
8	Rahel Daniel	Eritrea	8:46.53	NR
9	Laura Galván	Mexico	8:46.65	
10	Beatrice Chebet	Kenya	8:47.50	
11	Hanna Klein	Germany	8:48.73	
12	Selamawit Teferi	Israel	8:50.91	
13	Luiza Gega	Albania	8:53.14	
14	Edinah Jebitok	Kenya	8:53.25	
15	Amy-Eloise Markovc	Great Britain	8:53.57	
16	Marta Pérez	Spain	8:57.81	
17	Meraf Bahta	Sweden	8:58.68	
18	Julie-Anne Staehli	Canada	8:58.73	
19	Lauren Ryan	Australia	9:13.93	
20	Jhoselyn Camargo	Bolivia	9:28.98	NR
