= Pierre-Célestin Nihorimbere =

Burundian long-distance runner

Personal information
- Born: 11 January 1993 (age 33)

Sport
- Country: Burundi
- Sport: Track and field
- Event: long-distance running
- Updated on 2 September 2015

Pierre-Célestin Nihorimbere (born 11 January 1993) is a male Burundian long-distance runner. He competed in the marathon event at the 2015 World Championships in Athletics in Beijing, China.

== See also ==
- Burundi at the 2015 World Championships in Athletics
