= Palio Città della Quercia =

Athletics event in Rovereto, Italy

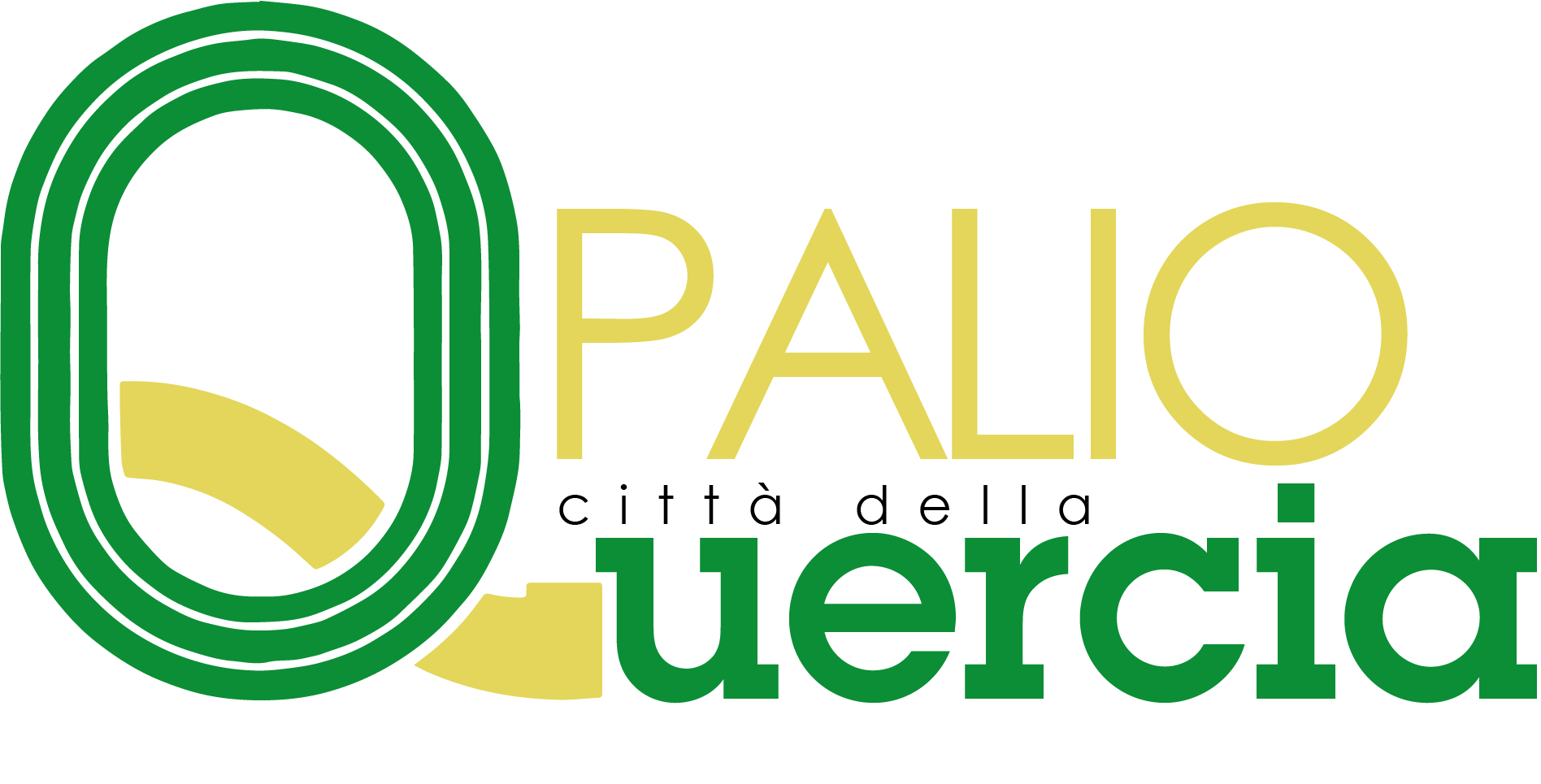
- Date: late August or early September
- Location: Rovereto, Italy
- Event type: Athletics
- World Athletics Cat.: World Continental Tour, Silver
- Established: 1965
- Website: paliocittadellaquercia.it

The Palio Città della Quercia is an annual track and field meeting held at the Quercia Stadium in Rovereto, Italy. Usually held in late August or early September, it is a European Athletics premier meeting. It is the oldest international athletics meeting in Italy, having been first held in Rovereto in 1965.

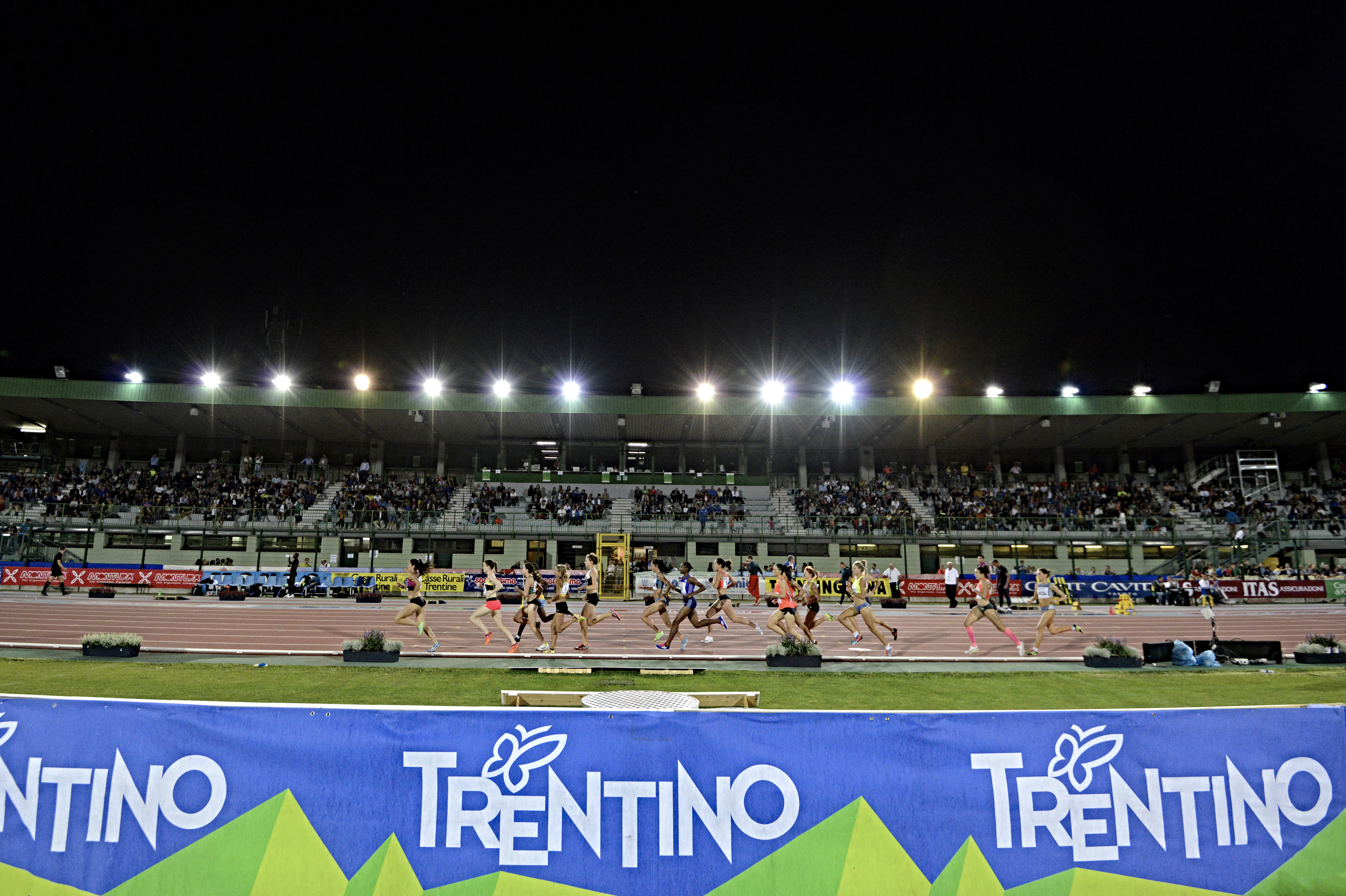
Stands of Stadio Quercia during the Palio Cittá della Quercia

Rovereto also hosts the Cross della Vallagarina, an elite level cross-country race.

== Meet records ==
=== Men ===
Men's meeting records of the Palio Città della Quercia
Event	Record	Athlete	Nationality	Date	Ref.
100 m	9.98 (+0.2 m/s)	Marvin Bracy	United States	31 August 2021	
200 m	20.07	Pietro Mennea	Italy	1 September 1980	
400 m	44.55	Michael Cherry	United States	31 August 2021	
600 m	1:14.41	Andrea Longo	Italy	2000	
800 m	1:43.94	Wycliffe Kinyamal	Kenya	29 August 2017	
1500 m	3:34.12	Peter Elliott	Great Britain	2 September 1990	
3000 m	7:33.32	Grant Fisher	United States	6 September 2023	
5000 m	13:08.43	Egide Ntakarutimana	Burundi	30 August 2022	
10,000 m	27:39.31	David Maritim	Kenya	2000	
110 m hurdles	13.27	Roger Kingdom	United States	2 September 1990	
400 m hurdles	48.08	Samuel Matete	Zambia	2 September 1995	
2000 m steeplechase	5:14.43	Julius Kariuki	Kenya	1990	
3000 m steeplechase	8:21.72	Laid Bessou	Algeria	2000	
High jump	2.35 m	Troy Kemp	Bahamas	1991	
High jump	2.35 m	Vyacheslav Voronin	Russia	1999	
Long jump	8.32 m	Nenad Stekić	Yugoslavia	1978	
Triple jump	17.27 m	Jonathan Edwards	Great Britain	2001	
Pole vault	5.81 m	Giuseppe Gibilisco	Italy	2005	
Shot put	21.88 m	Zane Weir	Italy	6 September 2023	
Discus throw	67.44 m	Luis Delis	Cuba	1984	
Hammer throw	76.60 m	Giampaolo Urlando	Italy	1980	
Javelin throw	85.66 m	Vítězslav Veselý	Czech Republic	4 September 2012	

=== Women ===
Women's meeting records of the Palio Città della Quercia
Event	Record	Athlete	Nationality	Date	Ref.
100 m	11.00 (+1.5 m/s)	Natasha Morrison	Jamaica	6 September 2023	
200 m	22.67 (+0.5 m/s)	Mariya Ryemyen	Ukraine	3 September 2013	
400 m	49.94	Antonina Krivoshapka	Russia	4 September 2012	
800 m	1:57.69	Fita Lovin	Romania	2 September 1981	
1000 m	2:31.66	Jolanda Čeplak	Slovenia	2002	
1500 m	3:57.31+	Genzebe Dibaba	Ethiopia	6 September 2016	
Mile	4:14.30	Genzebe Dibaba	Ethiopia	6 September 2016	
3000 m	8:39.95	Svetlana Aplachkina	Russia	31 August 2021	
5000 m	15:14.25	Priscah Jepleting Cherono	Kenya	2011	
10,000 m	32:30.91	Aurora Cunha	Portugal	1984	
100 m hurdles	12.76 (+0.9 m/s)	Sarah Lavin	Ireland	6 September 2023	
400 m hurdles	53.71	Andrea Blackett	Barbados	6 September 2003	
3000 m steeplechase	9:25.09	Mekdes Bekele	Ethiopia	2010	
Long jump	6.85 m	Fiona May	Italy	1997	
High jump	2.00 m	Lyudmila Andonova	Bulgaria	1984	
Pole vault	4.72 m	Stacy Dragila	United States	2002	
Pole vault	4.72 m	Roberta Bruni	Italy	30 August 2022	
Triple jump	14.98 m	Šárka Kašpárková	Czech Republic	1998	
Shot put	20.70 m	Helena Fibingerová	Czechoslovakia	1982	
Discus throw	67.20 m	Ilke Wyludda	Germany	1992	
Hammer throw	74.13 m	Tatyana Lysenko	Russia	2011	
Javelin throw	66.28 m	Osleidys Menéndez	Cuba	2005	
