= Burundi at the 2022 World Aquatics Championships =

- Flag of Burundi
- FINA code: BDI
- National federation: Fédération Burundaise de Natation

in Budapest, Hungary
- Competitors: 2 in 1 sport
- Medals: Gold 0 Silver 0 Bronze 0 Total 0

World Aquatics Championships appearances
- 1973; 1975; 1978; 1982; 1986; 1991; 1994; 1998; 2001; 2003; 2005; 2007; 2009; 2011; 2013; 2015; 2017; 2019; 2022; 2023; 2024

Burundi competed at the 2022 World Aquatics Championships in Budapest, Hungary from 18 June to 3 July.

== Swimming ==
Burundian swimmers have achieved qualifying standards in the following events.

Athlete	Event	Heat		Semifinal		Final	
Athlete	Event	Time	Rank	Time	Rank	Time	Rank
Belly-Cresus Ganira	Men's 50 m freestyle	24.03	60	did not advance			
Belly-Cresus Ganira	Men's 100 m freestyle	53.85	75	did not advance			
Alyse Leilla Maniriho	Women's 50 m freestyle	31.82	76	did not advance			
Alyse Leilla Maniriho	Women's 100 m freestyle	1:12.38	60	did not advance			
