= Georgia at the 2009 World Championships in Athletics =

- WA code: GEO

in Berlin
- Competitors: 2 (1 man, 1 woman)
- Medals: Gold 0 Silver 0 Bronze 0 Total 0

World Championships in Athletics appearances
- 1993; 1995; 1997; 1999; 2001; 2003; 2005; 2007; 2009; 2011; 2013; 2015; 2017; 2019; 2022; 2023; 2025

Georgia competed at the 2009 World Championships in Athletics from 15–23 August in Berlin.

== Team selection ==
Track and road events

Event	Athletes	
Event	Men	Women
110 metre hurdles	David Ilariani	

Field and combined events

Event	Athletes	
Event	Men	Women
Shot put		Mariam Kevkhishvili

== Results ==
=== Men ===
Track and road events

Event	Athletes	Heats		Semifinal		Final	
Event	Athletes	Result	Rank	Result	Rank	Result	Rank
110 m hurdles	David Ilariani	13.86	39	did not advance			

=== Women ===
Field and combined events

Event	Athletes	Qualification		Final	
Event	Athletes	Result	Rank	Result	Rank
Shot put	Mariam Kevkhishvili	17.95	14	did not advance	
