= 2019 World Athletics Championships – Women's 5000 metres =

Women's 5000 metres at the 2019 World Championships
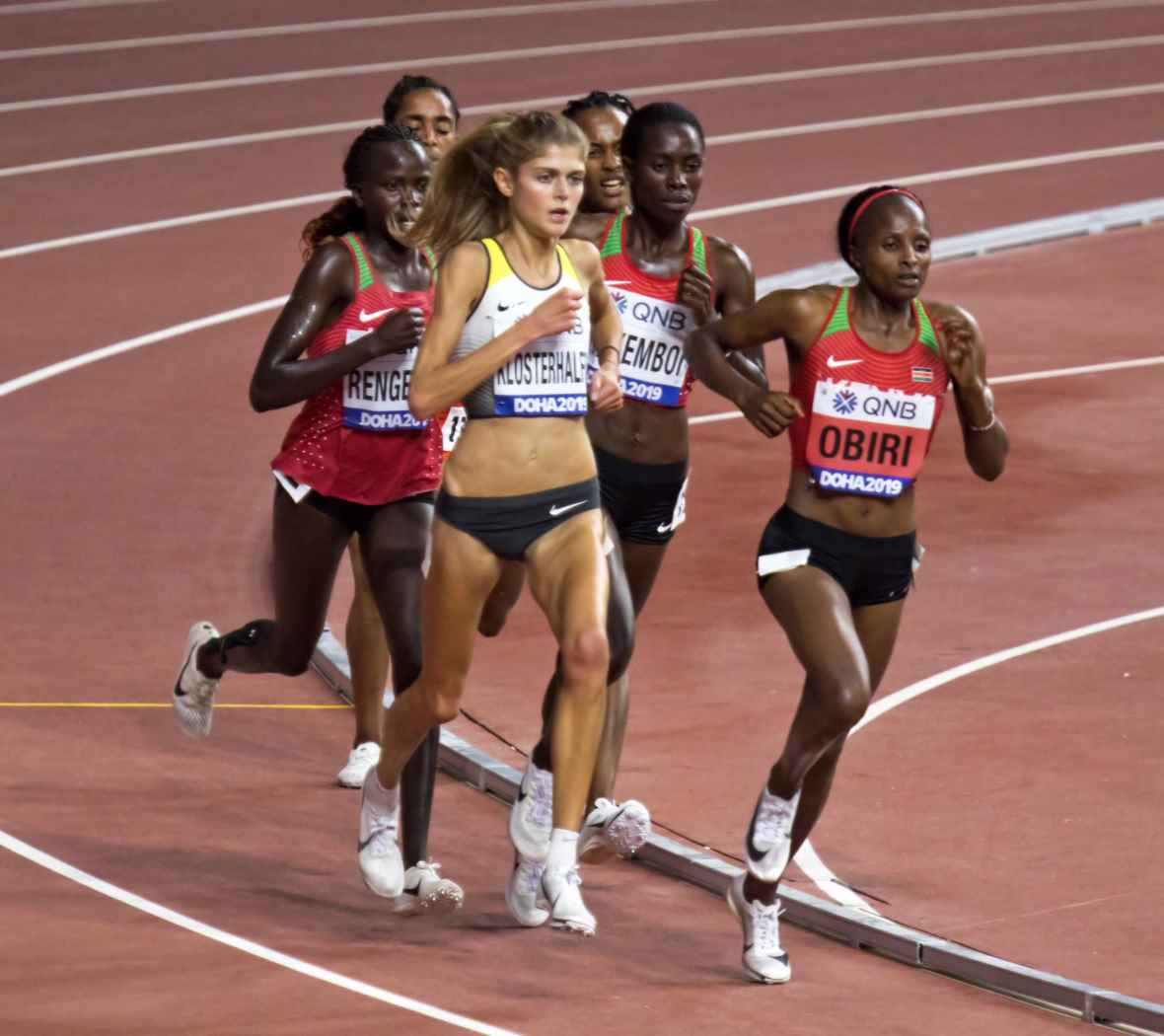
- 5000m women klosterhalfen obiri
- Venue: Khalifa International Stadium
- Dates: 2 October (heats); 5 October (final)
- Competitors: 29 from 18 nations
- Winning time: 14:26.72

Medalists
gold medal	Hellen Obiri	Kenya
silver medal	Margaret Chelimo Kipkemboi	Kenya
bronze medal	Konstanze Klosterhalfen	Germany

Video on YouTube Official Video

The women's 5000 metres at the 2019 World Athletics Championships was held at the Khalifa International Stadium in Doha, Qatar, from 2 to 5 October 2019.

== Records ==
Before the competition, the records were as follows:

Record	Perf.	Athlete	Nat.	Date	Location
World	14:11.15	Tirunesh Dibaba	ETH	6 Jun 2008	Oslo, Norway
Championship	14:26.83	Almaz Ayana	ETH	30 Aug 2015	Beijing, China
World leading	14:20.36	Hellen Onsando Obiri	KEN	21 Jul 2019	London, Great Britain
African	14:11.15	Tirunesh Dibaba	ETH	6 Jun 2008	Oslo, Norway
Asian	14:28.09	Bo Jiang	CHN	23 Oct 1997	Shanghai, China
NACAC	14:34.45	Shelby Houlihan	USA	21 Jul 2018	Heusden-Zolder, Belgium
South American	15:18.85	Simone da Silva	BRA	20 May 2011	São Paulo, Brazil
European	14:22.34	Sifan Hassan	NED	13 Jul 2018	Rabat, Morocco
Oceanian	14:39.89	Kim Smith	NZL	27 Feb 2009	New York City, USA

The following records were established during the competition:

Date	Event	Name	Nationality	Time	Record
5 October	Final	Hellen Obiri	KEN	14:26.72	CR

== Schedule ==
The event schedule, in local time (UTC+3), was as follows:

Date	Time	Round
2 October	18:25	Heats
5 October	21:25	Final

== Results ==
=== Heats ===
The first five in each heat (Q) and the next five fastest (q) qualified for the final.

Rank	Heat	Name	Nationality	Time	Notes
1	1	Hellen Obiri	Kenya	14:52.13	Q
2	1	Karissa Schweizer	United States	14:52.41	Q, PB
3	1	Hawi Feysa	Ethiopia	14:53.85	Q
4	1	Eilish McColgan	Great Britain & N.I.	14:55.79	Q
5	2	Tsehay Gemechu	Ethiopia	15:01.57	Q
6	2	Konstanze Klosterhalfen	Germany	15:01.57	Q
7	2	Margaret Chelimo Kipkemboi	Kenya	15:01.58	Q
8	2	Lilian Kasait Rengeruk	Kenya	15:02.03	Q
9	1	Camille Buscomb	New Zealand	15:02.19	Q, PB
10	2	Laura Weightman	Great Britain & N.I.	15:02.24	Q
11	2	Fantu Worku	Ethiopia	15:02.74	q
12	1	Nozomi Tanaka	Japan	15:04.66	q, PB
13	1	Andrea Seccafien	Canada	15:04.67	q, PB
14	1	Dominique Scott-Efurd	South Africa	15:05.01	q
15	1	Elinor Purrier	United States	15:08.82	q
16	2	Anna Emilie Møller	Denmark	15:11.76	
17	1	Sarah Chelangat	Uganda	15:19.90	
18	1	Hanna Klein	Germany	15:28.65	
19	2	Rachel Schneider	United States	15:30.00	
20	2	Melissa Duncan	Australia	15:37.37	
21	2	Rachel Cliff	Canada	15:41.27	
22	2	Jessica Judd	Great Britain & N.I.	15:51.48	
23	2	Valeriya Zhandarova	Georgia	15:52.11	
24	2	Tomoka Kimura	Japan	15:53.08	
25	1	Florencia Borelli	Argentina	15:56.49	
26	1	Cavaline Nahimana	Burundi	16:25.82	
	1	Karoline Bjerkeli Grøvdal	Norway	DNF	
	1	Maureen Koster	Netherlands	DNF	
	2	Tigist Gashaw	Bahrain	DNF	

=== Final ===
The final was started on 5 October at 21:25.

Rank	Name	Nationality	Time	Notes
1st place, gold medalist(s)	Hellen Obiri	Kenya	14:26.72	CR
2nd place, silver medalist(s)	Margaret Chelimo Kipkemboi	Kenya	14:27.49	PB
3rd place, bronze medalist(s)	Konstanze Klosterhalfen	Germany	14:28.43	
4	Tsehay Gemechu	Ethiopia	14:29.60	PB
5	Lilian Kasait Rengeruk	Kenya	14:36.05	PB
6	Fantu Worku	Ethiopia	14:40.47	PB
7	Laura Weightman	Great Britain & N.I.	14:44.57	PB
8	Hawi Feysa	Ethiopia	14:44.92	
9	Karissa Schweizer	United States	14:45.18	PB
10	Eilish McColgan	Great Britain & N.I.	14:46.17	PB
11	Elinor Purrier	United States	14:58.17	PB
12	Camille Buscomb	New Zealand	14:58.59	PB
13	Andrea Seccafien	Canada	14:59.95	PB
14	Nozomi Tanaka	Japan	15:00.01	PB
15	Dominique Scott-Efurd	South Africa	15:24.47	
