= 2024 World Athletics Indoor Championships – Women's 3000 metres =

Women's 3000 metres at the 2024 World Athletics Indoor Championships
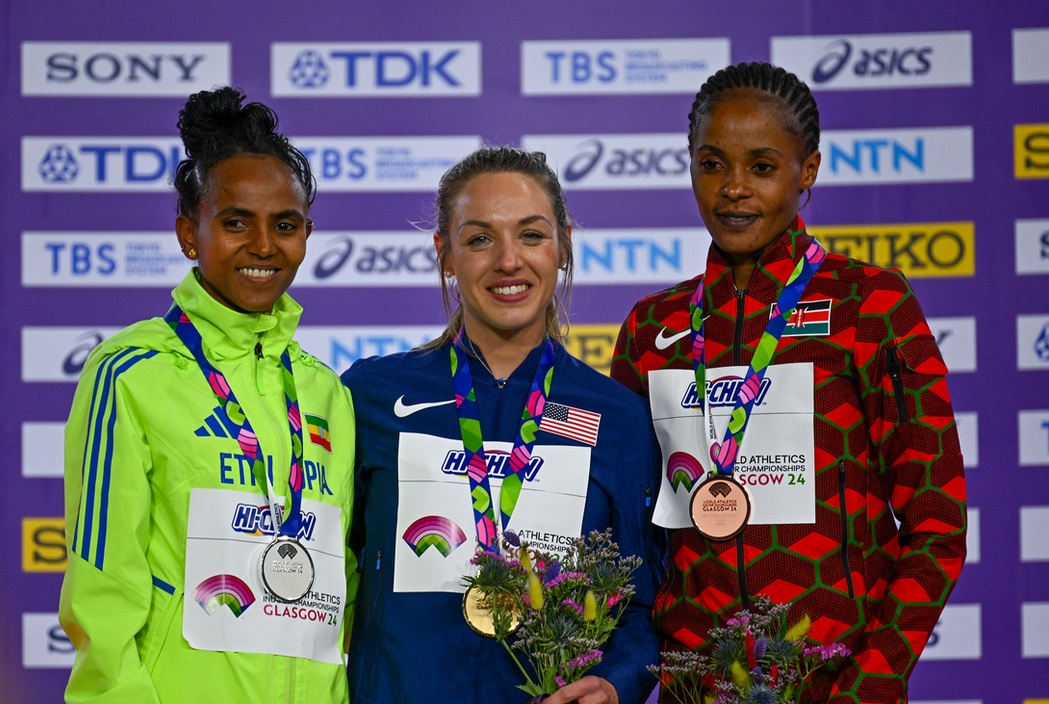
- Venue: Commonwealth Arena
- Dates: 1–3 March
- Competitors: 16 from 10 nations
- Winning time: 8:20.87

Medalists
gold medal	Elle Purrier St. Pierre	United States
silver medal	Gudaf Tsegay	Ethiopia
bronze medal	Beatrice Chepkoech	Kenya

The women's 3000 metres at the 2024 World Athletics Indoor Championships took place on 2 March 2024.

== Results ==
=== Final ===
The final was started on 2 March at 20:15.

Rank	Name	Nationality	Time	Notes
1st place, gold medalist(s)	Elle Purrier St. Pierre	United States	8:20.87	CR, AR
2nd place, silver medalist(s)	Gudaf Tsegay	Ethiopia	8:21.13	
3rd place, bronze medalist(s)	Beatrice Chepkoech	Kenya	8:22.68	NR
4	Jessica Hull	Australia	8:24.39	AR
5	Laura Muir	Great Britain	8:29.76	SB
6	Lemlem Hailu	Ethiopia	8:30.36	SB
7	Hirut Meshesha	Ethiopia	8:34.61	
8	Nozomi Tanaka	Japan	8:36.03	AR
9	Teresia Muthoni Gateri	Kenya	8:38.96	SB
10	Marta García	Spain	8:40.34	
11	Josette Andrews	United States	8:41.93	SB
12	Hannah Nuttall	Great Britain	8:48.24	
13	Ludovica Cavalli	Italy	8:48.46	
14	Águeda Marqués	Spain	8:48.57	
15	Roisin Flanagan	Ireland	8:53.02	PB
16	Emeline Imanizabayo	Rwanda	9:28.58	PB
