= Burundi at the 2019 World Aquatics Championships =

- Flag of Burundi
- FINA code: BDI
- National federation: Fédération Burundaise de Natation

in Gwangju, South Korea
- Competitors: 4 in 1 sport
- Medals: Gold 0 Silver 0 Bronze 0 Total 0

World Aquatics Championships appearances
- 1973; 1975; 1978; 1982; 1986; 1991; 1994; 1998; 2001; 2003; 2005; 2007; 2009; 2011; 2013; 2015; 2017; 2019; 2022; 2023; 2024

Burundi competed at the 2019 World Aquatics Championships in Gwangju, South Korea from 12 to 28 July.

== Swimming ==
Burundi has entered four swimmers.

Men

Athlete	Event	Heat		Semifinal		Final	
Athlete	Event	Time	Rank	Time	Rank	Time	Rank
Belly-Crésus Ganira	50 m freestyle	25.33	99	did not advance			
Belly-Crésus Ganira	100 m butterfly	1:03.34	76	did not advance			
Billy-Scott Irakoze	100 m freestyle	56.45	104	did not advance			
Billy-Scott Irakoze	50 m butterfly	28.43	76	did not advance			

Women

Athlete	Event	Heat		Semifinal		Final	
Athlete	Event	Time	Rank	Time	Rank	Time	Rank
Odrina Kaze	50 m freestyle	34.97	98	did not advance			
Odrina Kaze	50 m breaststroke	49.77	56	did not advance			
