= Burundi at the 2019 World Athletics Championships =

- WA code: BDI

in Doha, Qatar
- Competitors: 6 (4 men and 2 women) in 4 events
- Medals: Gold 0 Silver 0 Bronze 0 Total 0

World Athletics Championships appearances
- 1983; 1987; 1991; 1993; 1995; 1997; 1999; 2001; 2003; 2005; 2007; 2009; 2011; 2013; 2015; 2017; 2019; 2022; 2023

Burundi competed at the 2019 World Championships in Athletics in Doha, Qatar from 27 September to 6 October 2019.

== Results ==
Key

- Note–Ranks given for track events are within the athlete's heat only
- Q = Qualified for the next round
- q = Qualified for the next round as a fastest loser or, in field events, by position without achieving the qualifying target
- NR = National record
- PB = Personal best
- N/A = Round not applicable for the event
- Bye = Athlete not required to compete in round

=== Men ===
Track and road events

Athlete	Event	Heat		Semifinal		Final	
Athlete	Event	Result	Rank	Result	Rank	Result	Rank
Rodrigue Kwizera	10,000 metres	—				28:21.92 PB	16
Onesphore Nzikwinkunda	10,000 metres	—				29:11.50	18
Thierry Ndikumwenayo	10,000 metres	—				Did not finish	
Olivier Irabaruta	Marathon	—				did not finish	

=== Women ===
Track and road events

Athlete	Event	Heat		Semifinal		Final	
Athlete	Event	Result	Rank	Result	Rank	Result	Rank
Cavaline Nahimana	5000 metres	16:25.82	26	—		did not advance	
Elvanie Nimbona	Marathon	—				did not finish	
