= Georgia at the 2013 World Championships in Athletics =

- WA code: GEO
- National federation: Athletic Federation of Georgia
- Website: www.geoathletics.ge

in Moscow
- Competitors: 2
- Medals: Gold 0 Silver 0 Bronze 0 Total 0

World Championships in Athletics appearances
- 1993; 1995; 1997; 1999; 2001; 2003; 2005; 2007; 2009; 2011; 2013; 2015; 2017; 2019; 2022; 2023; 2025

Georgia competed at the 2013 World Championships in Athletics in Moscow, Russia, from 10–18 August 2013. A team of 2 athletes was announced to represent the country in the event.

== Results ==
(q – qualified, NM – no mark, SB – season best)

=== Men ===
Athlete	Event	Preliminaries		Heats		Semifinals		Final	
Athlete	Event	Time	Rank	Time	Rank	Time	Rank	Time	Rank
Maciej Rosiewicz	50 kilometres walk							-	DNF

=== Women ===
Athlete	Event	Preliminaries		Heats		Semifinals		Final	
Athlete	Event	Time	Rank	Time	Rank	Time	Rank	Time	Rank
Giuli Dekanadze	5000 metres							17:57.39	21
