= 2019 Balkan Athletics Indoor Championships =

- Dates: 16 February
- Host city: Istanbul, Turkey
- Venue: Ataköy Athletics Arena
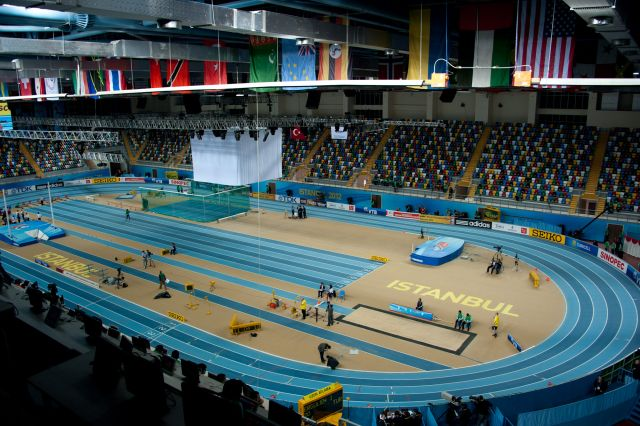
- Events: 24

The 2019 Balkan Athletics Indoor Championships was the 24th edition of the annual indoor track and field competition for athletes from the Balkans, organised by Balkan Athletics. It was held on 16 February at the Ataköy Athletics Arena in Istanbul, Turkey.

In a closely contested competition, Ukraine and the host nation Turkey each won four gold medals. Romania won the most medals overall, with a haul of 12, followed by Turkey on 11. Ukraine won the most women's events, with three, and Romanian won the most women's medals in total, with seven. Turkey was the most dominant in the men's side, having the highest medal total of seven and also the most gold medals, with three.

== Results ==
=== Men ===
| Event | Gold | | Silver | | Bronze | |
|---|---|---|---|---|---|---|
| 60 metres | Emre Zafer Barnes (TUR) | 6.69 | Petre Nicolae Rezmives (ROU) | 6.74 | Aleksa Kijanović (SRB) | 6.75 PB |
| 400 metres | Yavuz Can (TUR) | 46.75 | Vitaliy Butrym (UKR) | 47.09 | Franko Burraj (ALB) | 47.64 NR |
| 800 metres | Yevhen Hutsol (UKR) | 1:48.52 PB | Musa Hajdari (KOS) | 1:49.31 NR | Salih Teksöz (TUR) | 1:49.41 PB |
| 1500 metres | Elzan Bibić (SRB) | 3:43.13 PB | Dorin Andrei Rusu (ROU) | 3:44.26 PB | Yervand Mkrtchya (ARM) | 3:44.55 NR |
| 3000 metres | Mitko Tsenov (BUL) | 8:01.20 | Dario Ivanovski (MKD) | 8:03.65 NR | Yolo Nikolov (BUL) | 8:14.96 PB |
| 60 metres hurdles | Mikdat Sevler (TUR) | 7.85 NR | Filip Jakob Demšar (SLO) | 7.88 PB | Alexandr Cruselnitchii (MDA) | 8.15 |
| 4 × 400 m relay | Croatia; Mateo Parlov; David Salamon; Gabrijel Stojanović; Mateo Ružić | 3:13.99 NR | Turkey; Kubilay Ençü; Oğuz Akgül; Oğuzhan Kaya; Berke Akçam | 3:14.40 | Romania; Cristian Radu; Denis Mariusan Dobrică; Zeno Moraru; Mihai Cristian Pislaru | 3:15.20 |
| High jump | Tihomir Ivanov (BUL) | 2.28 =PB | Alperen Acet (TUR) | 2.26 NR | Mihai Donisan (ROU) | 2.19 |
| Pole vault | Lev Skorish (ISR) | 5.40 m | Ivan Horvat (CRO) | 5.30 m | Illya Kravchenko (UKR) | 5.20 m |
| Long jump | Gabriel Bitan (ROU) | 7.74 m | Izmir Smajlaj (ALB) | 7.70 m | Strahinja Jovančević (SRB) | 7.58 m |
| Triple jump | Levon Aghasyan (ARM) | 16.71 m PB | Nazim Babayev (AZE) | 16.68 m PB | Can Özüpek (TUR) | 16.21 m |
| Shot put | Mesud Pezer (BIH) | 20.22 m | Nicholas Scarvelis (GRE) | 19.72 m | Asmir Kolašinac (SRB) | 19.66 m |

=== Women ===
| Event | Gold | | Silver | | Bronze | |
|---|---|---|---|---|---|---|
| 60 metres | Diana Vaisman (ISR) | 7.34 NR | Yana Kachur (UKR) | 7.35 | Milana Tirnanić (SRB) | 7.36 PB |
| 400 metres | Eleni Artymata (CYP) | 54.18 | Maja Ćirić (SRB) | 54.49 | Lucija Pokos (CRO) | 54.59 |
| 800 metres | Jerneja Smonkar (SLO) | 2:07.89 PB | Florina Pierdevară (ROU) | 2:08.20 | Marija Stambolić (SRB) | 2:08.45 PB |
| 1500 metres | Amela Terzić (SRB) | 4:15.04 | Konstantina Giannopoulou (GRE) | 4:19.50 PB | Burcu Subatan (TUR) | 4:21.18 PB |
| 3000 metres | Luiza Gega (ALB) | 8:56.04 | Valeriya Zhandarova (GEO) | 9:16.56 | Claudia Prisecaru (ROU) | 9:16.59 PB |
| 60 metres hurdles | Sevval Ayaz (TUR) | 8.21 | Hanna Chubkovtsova (UKR) | 8.24 | Anamaria Nesteriuc (ROU) | 8.27 |
| 4 × 400 m relay | Ukraine; Kateryna Klymiuk; Tetyana Melnyk; Hanna Ryzhykova; Anastasiia Bryzgina | 3:33.76 | Romania; Camelia Gal; Cristina Daniela Bălan; Bianca Răzor; Sanda Belgyan | 3:42.39 | Croatia; Lucija Pokos; Ida Šimunčić; Veronika Drljačić; Kristina Dudek | 3:43.45 NR |
| High jump | Daniela Stanciu (ROU) | 1.92 m | Marija Vuković (MNE) | 1.92 m NR | Ana Šimić (CRO) | 1.90 m |
| Pole vault | Eleni-Klaudia Polak (GRE) | 4.40 m | Buse Arıkazan (TUR) | 4.30 m | Only two finishers | |
| Long jump | Maryna Bekh-Romanchuk (UKR) | 6.76 m | Florentina Iusco (ROU) | 6.39 m | Milena Mitkova (BUL) | 6.22 m |
| Triple jump | Hanna Krasutska (UKR) | 13.77 m | Cristina Bujin (ROU) | 13.47 m | Paola Borović (CRO) | 13.38 m |
| Shot put | Radoslava Mavrodieva (BUL) | 18.71 m | Dimitriana Surdu (MDA) | 18.52 m NR | Emel Dereli (TUR) | 17.77 m |
