= Julia Dubina =

Georgian triple jumper

Personal information
- Full name: Julia Dubina
- Nationality: Georgia
- Born: 23 June 1984 (age 42) Tbilisi, Georgian SSR, Soviet Union
- Height: 1.67 m (5 ft 5 1/2 in)
- Weight: 52 kg (115 lb)

Sport
- Sport: Athletics
- Event: Triple jump

Achievements and titles
- Personal best: Triple jump: 14.03 (2004)

Julia Dubina (Georgian: იულია დუბინა; born 23 June 1984 in Tbilisi) is a Georgian triple jumper. She was selected to compete for the Georgian Olympic squad in the triple jump at the 2004 Summer Olympics, after leaping her own personal best and a national record of 14.03 metres from the athletics meet in Baku.

Dubina qualified for the Georgian squad in the women's triple jump at the 2004 Summer Olympics in Athens. Two months before the Games, she demolished the Georgian record of 14.03 metres to guarantee an Olympic B-standard from the athletics meet in Baku. During the prelims, Dubina spanned a satisfying 13.36-metre leap on her opening attempt, but her resilient effort was just worthily enough for the thirty-first position in a field of thirty-three athletes, failing to advance further to the final round.
