= Zurab Gogochuri =

Georgian high jumper

Zurab Gogochuri (Georgian: ზურაბ გოგოჭური, born 22 March 1990 in Tbilisi) is a Georgian high jumper.

His personal best is 2.26 m (7 ft 5 in) (NR, 2012). He won the high jump during the 2013 European Team Championships and 2017 European Team Championships.
