= 2018 African Youth Games =

Multi-sport event in Algiers, Algeria

- Nations: 55
- Athletes: 3,300
- Events: 30 sports
- Opening: 18 July 2018
- Closing: 28 July 2018
- Opened by: President Abdelaziz Bouteflika
- Ceremony venue: July 5, 1962 Stadium, Algiers, Algeria
- Website: web.archive.org/web/20180722135506/https://jajalger2018.org/fr/?lang=en

The 3rd African Youth Games took place in Algiers, Algeria from 18 to 28 July 2018. The Games featured approximately 3,300 athletes from 55 African countries who competed in 30 sports. Algiers was awarded the games by Association of National Olympic Committees of Africa in 2014.

== Participating nations ==
- Algeria (host) (432)
- Angola
- Benin
- Botswana
- Burkina Faso
- Burundi
- Cameroon
- Cape Verde
- Central African Republic
- Chad
- Comoros
- Republic of the Congo
- Ivory Coast
- Djibouti
- Democratic Republic of the Congo
- Egypt
- Equatorial Guinea
- Eritrea
- Ethiopia
- Gabon
- The Gambia
- Ghana
- Guinea
- Guinea-Bissau
- Kenya
- Lesotho
- Liberia
- Libya
- Madagascar
- Malawi
- Mali
- Mauritania
- Mauritius
- Morocco
- Mozambique
- Namibia
- Niger
- Nigeria
- Rwanda
- (Sahrawi Arab Democratic Republic) Sahrawi Republic
- São Tomé and Príncipe
- Senegal
- Seychelles
- Sierra Leone
- Somalia
- South Africa
- South Sudan
- Sudan
- Eswatini
- Tanzania
- Togo
- Tunisia (206)
- Uganda
- Zambia
- Zimbabwe

== Sports ==
Thirty sports were contested in this edition of African Youth Games. Archery, athletics, Badiminton, beach volleyball, field hockey, rowing, and rugby sevens competition also served as qualification for the 2018 Youth Olympic Games.

- 3x3 basketball
- Archery
- Athletics
- Badminton
- Boules
- Boxing
- Canoeing
- Cycling
- Equestrian
- Fencing
- Football
- Field hockey
- Gymnastics
- Handball
- Judo
- Karate
- Rowing
- Rugby sevens
- Sailing
- Shooting
- Swimming
- Table tennis
- Taekwondo
- Tennis
- Triathlon
- Volleyball
  - Beach volleyball
- Vovinam
- Weightlifting
- Wrestling
- Wushu

Exhibition sports

- Golf
- Motocross
- Sambo
- Speed-ball

== Medal table ==
Host nation

Rank	Nation	Gold	Silver	Bronze	Total
1	Egypt (EGY)	103	57	44	204
2	Algeria (ALG)*	71	71	83	225
3	Tunisia (TUN)	36	46	54	136
4	Morocco (MAR)	29	37	39	105
5	Nigeria (NGR)	29	32	42	103
6	South Africa (RSA)	15	13	5	33
7	Ethiopia (ETH)	11	8	6	25
8	Mauritius (MRI)	8	9	13	30
9	Namibia (NAM)	8	7	13	28
10	Kenya (KEN)	6	4	5	15
11	Ivory Coast (CIV)	3	2	9	14
12	Mali (MLI)	2	0	3	5
13	Mozambique (MOZ)	2	0	0	2
14	Cameroon (CMR)	1	7	11	19
15	Botswana (BOT)	1	3	10	14
16	Zimbabwe (ZIM)	1	3	4	8
17	Zambia (ZAM)	1	2	1	4
18	Gabon (GAB)	1	1	3	5
19	Guinea (GUI)	1	1	2	4
20	The Gambia (GAM)	1	0	2	3
21	Angola (ANG)	0	4	3	7
22	Libya (LBA)	0	3	11	14
23	Ghana (GHA)	0	3	3	6
24	Burundi (BDI)	0	3	2	5
24	Uganda (UGA)	0	3	2	5
26	Rwanda (RWA)	0	2	1	3
26	Senegal (SEN)	0	2	1	3
28	Chad (CHA)	0	1	4	5
29	Madagascar (MAD)	0	1	3	4
30	Eritrea (ERI)	0	1	0	1
30	Liberia (LBR)	0	1	0	1
32	Seychelles (SEY)	0	0	3	3
33	Benin (BEN)	0	0	2	2
33	Togo (TOG)	0	0	2	2
35	Djibouti (DJI)	0	0	1	1
35	Sierra Leone (SLE)	0	0	1	1
35	Somalia (SOM)	0	0	1	1
35	Sudan (SUD)	0	0	1	1
Totals (38 entries)		330	327	390	1,047
