= Valeriya Zhandarova =

Georgian long-distance runner

Personal information
- National team: Georgia
- Born: 17 March 1994 (age 31)

Sport
- Sport: Athletics
- Event: Long-distance running

Valeriya Zhandarova (born 17 March 1994) is a Georgian long-distance runner who specialises in the 5000 metres. She holds the Georgian national record for the distance, with her best of 15:33.10 minutes, as well as the national record for the 3000 metres steeplechase (10:13.69). Zhandarova initially competed for Russia.

== Career ==
Internationally, she represented her country at the 2019 World Athletics Championships. She won two silver medals in the 3000 metres at the Balkan Athletics Indoor Championships in 2018 and 2019, finishing behind Albania's Luiza Gega both times. She was the gold medalist over that distance at the 2018 Championships of the Small States of Europe.

She made her debut over the half marathon distance in Kraków in 2019, placing seventh with a time of 1:14:14 hours.

== International competitions ==
Representing Georgia
Year	Competition	Venue	Position	Event	Result	Notes
2018	Balkan Indoor Championships	Istanbul, Turkey	2nd	3000 m	9:16.48	
2018	Championships of the Small States of Europe	Schaan, Liechtenstein	1st	3000 m	9:13.20	
2019	Balkan Indoor Championships	Istanbul, Turkey	2nd	3000 m	9:16.56	
2019	European Team Championships 2nd League	Varaždin, Croatia	4th	3000 m	9:24.02	
2019	European Team Championships 2nd League	Varaždin, Croatia	5th	5000 m	16:15.11	
2019	World Championships	Doha, Qatar	23rd (h)	5000 m	15:52.11	12th in heat 2
