= Burundi at the 2017 World Championships in Athletics =

- WA code: BDI

in London, United Kingdom
- Competitors: 4
- Medals Ranked =31th: Gold 0 Silver 1 Bronze 0 Total 1

World Championships in Athletics appearances
- 1983; 1987; 1991; 1993; 1995; 1997; 1999; 2001; 2003; 2005; 2007; 2009; 2011; 2013; 2015; 2017; 2019; 2022; 2023

Burundi competed at the 2017 World Championships in Athletics in London, United Kingdom, 4–13 August 2017.

== Medalists ==
The following competitors from Burundi won medals at the Championships:

Medal	Athlete	Event	Date
Silver	Francine Niyonsaba	Women's 800 m	13 August

== Results ==
(q – qualified, NM – no mark, SB – season best)

=== Men ===
Track and road events

Athlete	Event	Heat		Semifinal		Final	
Athlete	Event	Result	Rank	Result	Rank	Result	Rank
Antoine Gakeme	800 metres	1:45.97	11 q	1:47.08	21	Did not advance	
Onesphore Nzikwinkunda	10,000 metres	—				28:09.98 PB	19
Abraham Niyonkuru	Marathon	—				2:42.27	71

=== Women ===
Track and road events

Athlete	Event	Heat		Semifinal		Final	
Athlete	Event	Result	Rank	Result	Rank	Result	Rank
Francine Niyonsaba	800 metres	1:59.86	1 Q	2:01.11	16 Q	1:55.92	2nd place, silver medalist(s)
