= Elle Purrier St. Pierre =

American runner (born 1995)

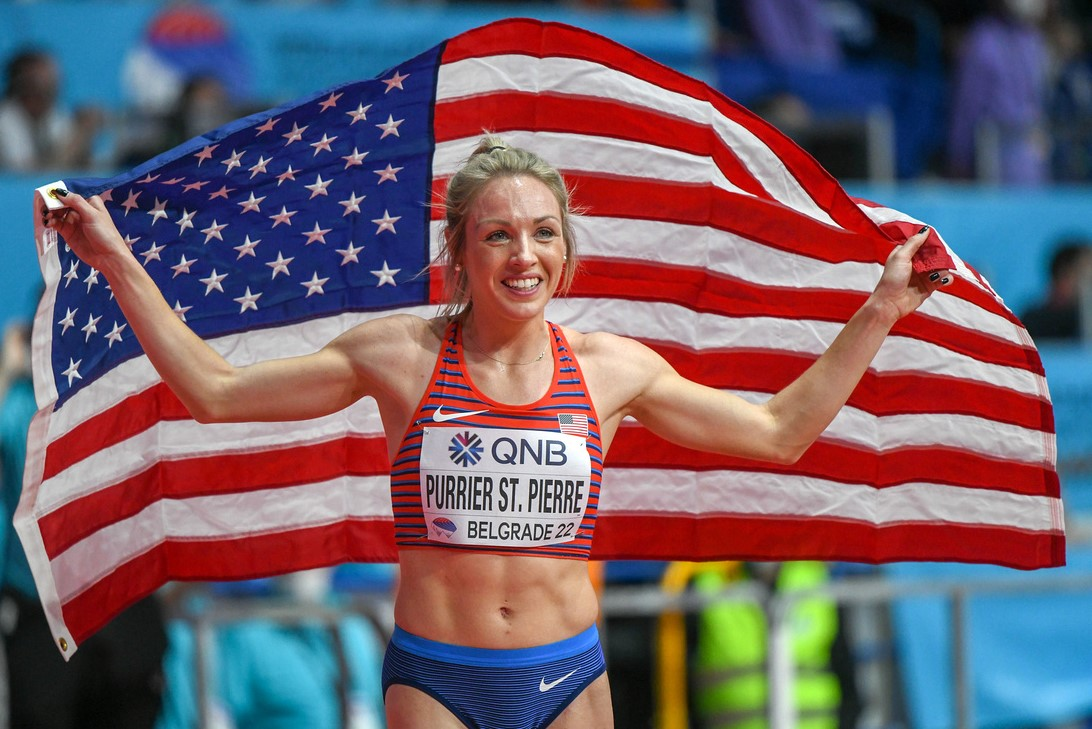
- Purrier after winning silver at the 2022 World Athletics Indoor Championships – Women's 3000 metres

Personal information
- Full name: Elinor Purrier St. Pierre
- Born: Elinor Purrier; February 20, 1995 (age 31) Montgomery Center, Vermont, U.S.
- Height: 5 ft 3 in (160 cm)

Sport
- Sport: Athletics
- Events: 1500 m One mile 3000 m 3000 m steeplechase 5000 m
- College team: New Hampshire
- Club: New Balance Boston
- Turned pro: 2018
- Coached by: Mark Coogan
Medal record
Women's athletics
Representing the United States
World Indoor Championships
Gold medal – first place	2024 Glasgow	3000 m
Silver medal – second place	2022 Belgrade	3000 m

Elinor Purrier St. Pierre (born February 20, 1995), better known as Elle Purrier St. Pierre, (Note: First name pronounced /ˈɛli/) is an American track and field athlete who specializes in middle-distance and long-distance running. She won a gold medal in the 3000 meters at the 2024 World Athletics Indoor Championships in Glasgow. Purrier is a two-time Olympian for the United States, making the final in the 1500m at both the 2020 and 2024 Olympic Games.

== Early life and youth sports ==
Purrier was raised in Montgomery Center, Vermont, a small town near the Canadian border. She lived on a dairy farm, where she woke up at 5 a.m. each day before school to milk cows and perform other chores, such as throwing hay bales and caring for pigs. At Richford High School, Purrier took up running alongside basketball. She competed at a high level in track and cross country, with first-place finishes at the New England Cross Country Championships and Northeast Regional championships for the Nike Cross Nationals. She was named Vermont Gatorade Cross Country Athlete of the Year three times, receiving the honor in 2010, 2011, and 2012. Purrier was inducted into the hall of fame of the Vermont Principals' Association in 2022.

== College competition ==
Purrier competed for the University of New Hampshire from 2013 to 2018, where she was NCAA champion and an 11-time All-American. As a freshman, she ran 4:36 in the mile. By her sophomore year, she improved her time to 4:29.71, setting a school record and achieving one of the top ten fastest times by a collegiate athlete. Her fast time in the mile marked her as a favorite to win the event at the 2016 NCAA Division I Indoor Championships. At those championships, she finished third after leading for much of the race but was overtaken in the final stretch. Later that year, Purrier improved one place to take second in the mile at the 2016 NCAA Outdoor Championships. Following several podium finishes at previous NCAA championships, Purrier won a title in the mile at the 2018 NCAA Division I Indoor Championships, finishing in 4:31.76. She led for most of the race and finished just ahead of Dani Jones and Niki Hiltz, with less than a second difference between them.

Purrier also competed at a high level in the steeple while at the University of New Hampshire. In 2014, she won a national title in the 3000 meter steeplechase, and went on to place ninth in the final of the event at the 2014 World Junior Championships in Athletics. Later in her collegiate career, she finished third in the steeplechase at the 2016 NCAA Division I Outdoor Championships. In 2016, the U.S. Track & Field and Cross Country Coaches Association named Purrier its Northeast Region Track Athlete of the Year.

Purrier majored in nutrition, graduating in 2018.

== Professional career ==
Purrier signed with New Balance in July 2018.

=== 2019 ===
At the 2019 USA Indoor Championships, Purrier finished sixth in the mile and won the bronze medal in the two miles. At the 2019 USA Outdoor Championships, she won the bronze medal in the 5000 m. She competed at the 2019 World Championships in October and finished 11th in the 5000 m.

=== 2020 ===
At the 2020 Millrose Games on February 8, Purrier broke the American record for the indoor mile with a time of 4:16.85. At the 2020 USA Indoor Championships, she finished fourth in the 5000 m.

=== 2021 ===
On February 13, 2021, Purrier broke the American indoor two mile record with a time of 9:10.28. At the 2020 USA Olympic Trials, she won the gold medal in the 1500 m with a time of 3:58.03, setting a personal best and breaking the meet record. She competed at the 2020 Olympic Games in August 2021. She finished 10th in the 1500 m.

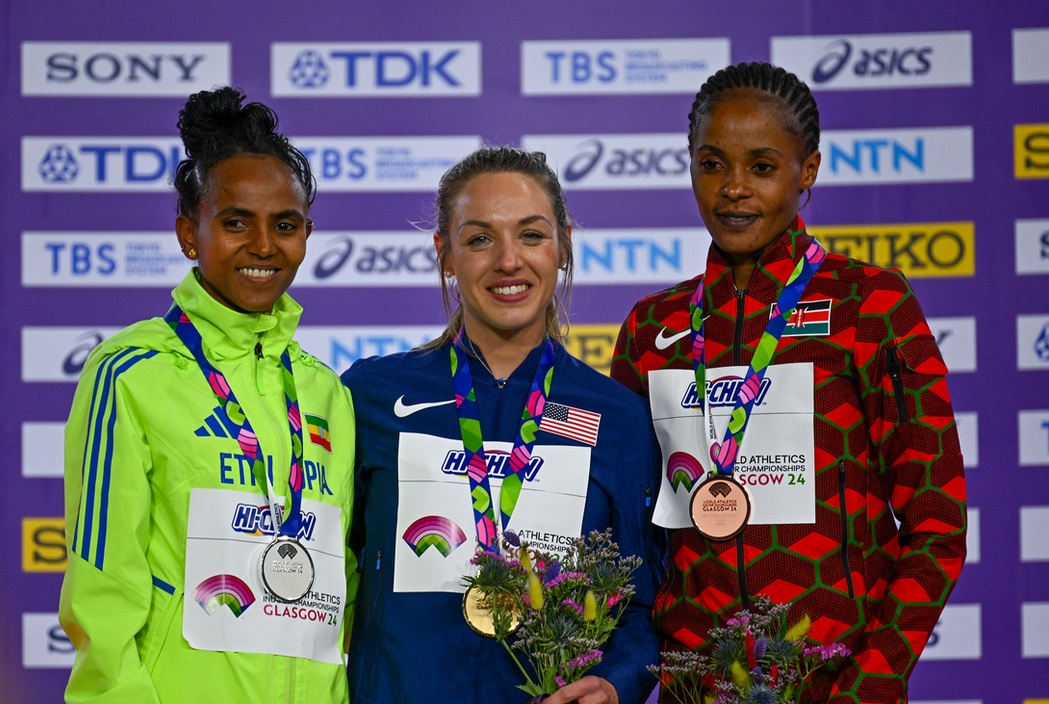
Purrier (center) on the podium after taking gold at the 2024 World Athletics Indoor Championships – Women's 3000 metres

=== 2022 ===
At the 2022 USA Indoor Championships, Purrier won the bronze medal in the 1500 m and the gold medal in the 3000 m. She competed at the 2022 World Indoor Championships in March and won the silver medal in the 3000 m.

While pregnant, Purrier competed at the 2022 USA Outdoor Championships and won the bronze medal in the 1500 m. She competed at the 2022 World Championships in July and did not advance to the final of the 1500 m.

=== 2024 ===
In February 2024, Purrier broke her own American record at the Wanamaker Mile race at the Millrose Games in New York City, running 4:16.41. In her first major international competition since giving birth to her first child, she won gold in the 3000 meters at the 2024 World Athletics Indoor Championships in Glasgow, Scotland. Her race set the American record for the 3000m.

== Personal life ==
Purrier is a dairy farmer from Vermont. She married her longtime boyfriend Jamie St. Pierre in 2020 and gave birth to their son in March 2023. Their second son was born in May 2025.

The St. Pierre family runs the Pleasant Valley Farm in Berkshire, Vermont. In April 2025, U.S. Customs and Border Patrol agents raided the farm and detained eight undocumented migrant farmworkers. It has been called the "largest immigration enforcement action in recent Vermont history" and was described as an "injustice" by members of the Migrant Justice Farmworker Coordinating Committee.

== Championship results ==
=== National ===
Year	Competition	Venue	Position	Event	Time
Representing the University of New Hampshire
2014	USA Junior Championships	Eugene, Oregon	1st	3000 m s'chase	10:24.46
2016	USA Olympic Trials	Eugene, Oregon	28th	3000 m s'chase	10:08.39
Representing New Balance
2018	USA Outdoor Championships	Des Moines, Iowa	6th	1500 m	4:09.30
2019	USA Indoor Championships	New York, New York	6th	One mile	4:32.69
2019	USA Indoor Championships	New York, New York	3rd	Two miles	9:34.65
2019	USA Outdoor Championships	Des Moines, Iowa	3rd	5000 m	15:17.46
2020	USA Indoor Championships	Albuquerque, New Mexico	4th	3000 m	8:56.56
2021	USA Olympic Trials	Eugene, Oregon	1st	1500 m	3:58.03 PB
2022	USA Indoor Championships	Spokane, Washington	3rd	1500 m	4:06.14
2022	USA Indoor Championships	Spokane, Washington	1st	3000 m	8:41.53
2022	USA Outdoor Championships	Eugene, Oregon	3rd	1500 m	4:05.14
2022	USA Outdoor Championships	Eugene, Oregon	20th	5000 m	16:15.83

=== International ===
Representing the United States
Year	Competition	Venue	Position	Event	Time
2014	World Junior Championships	Eugene, OR, United States	9th	3000 m s'chase	10:21.59
2019	World Championships	Doha, Qatar	11th	5000 m	14:58.17
2021	Olympic Games	Tokyo, Japan	10th	1500 m	4:01.75
2022	World Indoor Championships	Belgrade, Serbia	2nd	3000 m	8:42.04
2024	World Indoor Championships	Glasgow, United Kingdom	1st	3000 m	8:20.87
2024	Olympic Games	Paris, France	8th	1500 m	3:57.52

== Personal bests ==
All sourced from World Athletics, as of February 11, 2024.

Outdoor
Discipline	Mark	Venue	Date	Notes
800 meters	1:59.99	Irvine, CA (USA)	May 15, 2021	
1500 meters	3:55.99	Hayward Field, Eugene, OR (USA)	June 30, 2024	
One mile	4:30.30	Alexander Stadium, Birmingham (GBR)	August 18, 2019	
3000 meters	8:46.43	Cork (IRL)	July 16, 2018	
5000 meters	14:34.12	Los Angeles, CA (USA)	May 17, 2024	
3000 meters steeplechase	9:43.65	Providence, RI (USA)	April 15, 2017	
One mile road	4:25.0	Honolulu, HI (USA)	December 7, 2019	
4x800 meters relay	8:47.16	Durham, NH (USA)	May 7, 2017	

Indoor
Discipline	Mark	Venue	Date	Notes
800 meters	2:03.64	Boston, MA (USA)	February 24, 2018	
1000 meters	2:46.02	Durham, NH (USA)	January 16, 2016	
1500 meters	4:00.20	Armory Track, New York, NY (USA)	February 8, 2020	
One mile	4:16.41	Armory Track, New York, NY (USA)	February 11, 2024	North American record
3000 meters	8:20.87	Commonwealth Arena, Glasgow, UK	March 2, 2024	North American record
Two miles	9:10.28	Ocean Breeze Athl. Complex, New York, NY (USA)	February 13, 2021	North American record
4x800 meters relay	9:15.98	Durham, NH (USA)	January 16, 2016	
Distance medley relay	10:33.85	The Track at New Balance, Boston, MA (USA)	April 15, 2022	World record (p)
