= Burundi at the 2009 World Championships in Athletics =

- WA code: BDI

in Berlin
- Competitors: 2 (1 man, 1 woman)
- Medals: Gold 0 Silver 0 Bronze 0 Total 0

World Championships in Athletics appearances
- 1983; 1987; 1991; 1993; 1995; 1997; 1999; 2001; 2003; 2005; 2007; 2009; 2011; 2013; 2015; 2017; 2019; 2022; 2023

Burundi competes at the 2009 World Championships in Athletics from 15–23 August in Berlin.

== Team selection ==
Event	Athletes	
Event	Men	Women
5000 metres	Etienne Bizamana	Pauline Niyongere

== Results ==
=== Men ===
Event	Athletes	Heats		Final	
Event	Athletes	Result	Rank	Result	Rank
5000 m	Etienne Bizamana	14:06.02 PB	33	did not advance	

=== Women ===
Event	Athletes	Heats		Final	
Event	Athletes	Result	Rank	Result	Rank
5000 m	Pauline Niyongere	16:33.77 PB	21	did not advance	
