= Cavaline Nahimana =

Burundian long-distance runner

Personal information
- Born: 14 January 1997 (age 28)

Sport
- Country: Burundi
- Sport: Long-distance running

Cavaline Nahimana (born 14 January 1997) is a Burundian long-distance runner. In 2019, she competed in the senior women's race at the 2019 IAAF World Cross Country Championships. In 2019, she also competed in the women's 5000 metres event at the 2019 World Athletics Championships held in Doha, Qatar. She did not qualify to compete in the final.

In 2014, she competed in the girls' 3000 metres event at the 2014 Summer Youth Olympics held in Nanjing, China.

In 2017, she competed in the senior women's race at the 2017 IAAF World Cross Country Championships held in Kampala, Uganda. She finished in 19th place.

In 2019, she represented Burundi at the 2019 African Games held in Rabat, Morocco in the women's 5000 metres event. She finished in 8th place.
