= Egide Ntakarutimana =

Burundian long-distance runner (born 1997)

Personal information
- Nationality: Burundi
- Born: 21 October 1997 (28 years, 285 days old)
- Height: 173 cm (5 ft 8 in)
- Weight: 57 kg (126 lb)

Sport
- Sport: Sport of athletics
- Events: 5000 metres 10,000 metres
- Club: On Running; Atletica Casone Noceto

Achievements and titles
- National finals: 2023 Italian XC; • 10km XC, 1st (gold); 2023 Italian 10K Champs; • 10km, road, 1st (gold)
- Personal bests: 3000 m: 7:35.16 (2025); 5000 m: 13:00.74 (2024); 10,000m: 27:24.59 (2022)
- Updated on 6 April 2024

Egide Ntakarutimana (born 21 October 1997) is a Burundian long-distance runner based in Italy. He has represented Burundi at four World Athletics championship events, with a best finish of 13th at the 2023 World Athletics Road Running Championships 5K run.

== Career ==
In August 2022, Ntakarutimana won the Palio Città della Quercia 5000 m in a new meeting record of 13:08.43. As of that October, Ntakarutimana was ranked first in Italy in the 10K run.

== Personal life ==
Ntakarutimana was born in Burundi, but since signing with On Running he moved to train at Tuscany Camp outside Siena, Italy. He is a part of the Atletica Casone Noceto club, along with Yassine Rachik.

== Statistics ==
=== Personal best progression ===
5000m progression
#	Mark	Pl.	Competition	Venue	Date	Ref.
1	14:10.34	1st place, gold medalist(s)	Meeting Su Pista Regione Fvg	Brugnera, Italy	9 Jul 2021	
2	13:27.51	1st place, gold medalist(s)	Serata Del Mezzofondo	Alba, Italy	2 Sep 2021	
3	13:26.81	1st place, gold medalist(s)	Meeting Città Di Conegliano	Conegliano, Italy	10 Jun 2022	
4	13:08.43	1st place, gold medalist(s)	Palio Città della Quercia	Rovereto, Italy	29 Aug 2022	
5	13:06.76	5th	Fast 5000	Montesson, France	9 Jun 2023	
6	13:03.61	2nd place, silver medalist(s)	Track Night Vienna	Wien, Austria	16 Jun 2023	
