= Onesphore Nzikwinkunda =

Burundian long-distance runner

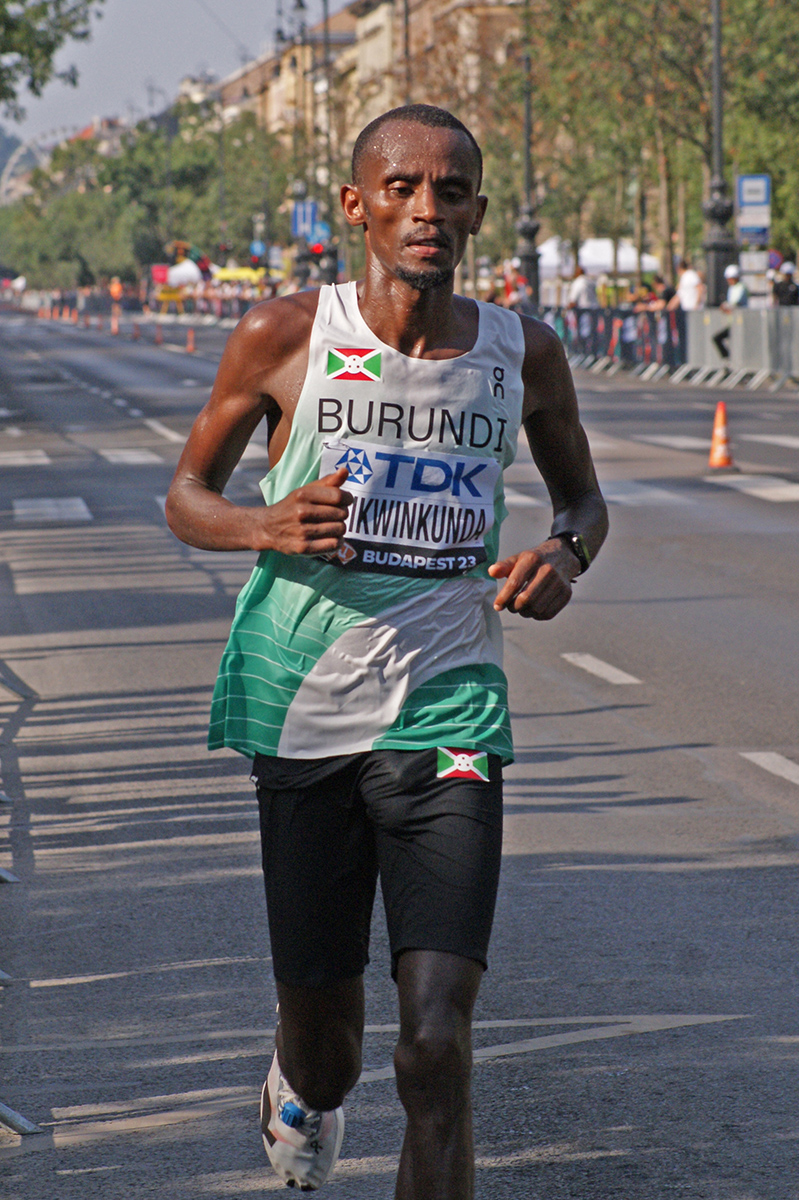

Personal information
- Nationality: Burundian
- Born: 10 June 1997 (age 29)

Sport
- Sport: Athletics
- Event(s): 5000 m 10000 m

Achievements and titles
- Personal bests: Marathon: 2:12:11 (2018); 10,000 Metres: 28:09.98 (2017); 5,000 Metres: 13:27.36 (2017)

Onesphore Nzikwinkunda (born 10 June 1997) is a Burundian long-distance runner, who specializes in the 5K and 10K. In 2019, he competed in the men's 10,000 metres at the 2019 World Athletics Championships held in Doha, Qatar. He finished in 18th place.

In 2017, he competed in the senior men's race at the 2017 IAAF World Cross Country Championships held in Kampala, Uganda. He finished in 14th place. In 2019, he competed in the senior men's race at the 2019 IAAF World Cross Country Championships held in Aarhus, Denmark. He again finished in 14th place.

In 2019, he also represented Burundi at the 2019 African Games and he finished in 6th place in the men's 10,000 metres event.
