= Daviti Kharazishvili =

Georgian marathon runner

Daviti Kharazishvili (born 24 April 1992 in Tbilisi) is a Georgian marathon runner. He competed at the 2016 Summer Olympics in the men's marathon, in which he placed 72nd. In 2018, he competed in the men's half marathon at the 2018 IAAF World Half Marathon Championships held in Valencia, Spain. He finished in 99th place.
