= Georgia at the 2012 European Athletics Championships =

Georgia competed at the 2012 European Athletics Championships held in Helsinki, Finland, between 27 June to 1 July 2012. Five competitors (three men and two women) took part in five events.

== Results ==
=== Men ===
Track events

Event	Athletes	Heat		Semifinal		Final	
Event	Athletes	Result	Rank	Result	Rank	Result	Rank
110 m hurdles	David Ilariani	13.85	20 q	13.88	23	did not advance	

Field events

Event	Athletes	Qualification		Final	
Event	Athletes	Result	Rank	Result	Rank
Long jump	Boleslav Skhirtladze	7.23	30	did not advance	
High jump	Zurab Gogochuri	2.10	28	did not advance	

=== Women ===
Field events

Event	Athletes	Qualification		Final	
Event	Athletes	Result	Rank	Result	Rank
Long jump	Maiko Gogoladze	5.71	29	did not advance	
Discus throw	Salome Rigishvili	49.65	24	did not advance	
