= Georgia at the 2010 European Athletics Championships =

Sporting event delegation

Georgia was represented by 2 athletes at the 2010 European Athletics Championships held in Barcelona, Spain.

== Participants ==
Event	Men	Women
110 m hurdles	David Ilariani	
Shot Put		Mariam Kevkhishvili

== Results ==
2010 Barcelona	Gold	Silver	Bronze	Total
Georgia (GEO)	0	0	0	0
