= Athletic Federation of Georgia =

Sports governing body in Georgia

- Sport: Athletics
- Founded: 1991
- Affiliation: World Athletics
- Regional affiliation: EAA
- Headquarters: Tbilisi
- President: Aleksi Akhvlediani
- Secretary: Gvantsa Mikeladze

Official website
- www.geoathletics.ge
- (Georgia (country))

The Athletic Federation of Georgia (Georgian: საქართველოს მძლეოსნობის ეროვნული ფედერაცია) is the governing body for the sport of athletics in Georgia.

== Affiliations ==
- World Athletics
- European Athletic Association (EAA)
- Georgian National Olympic Committee

== National records ==
The Georgian Federation maintains the Georgian records in athletics.
