= Flag of Burundi =

Republic of Burundi
- Use: National flag and ensign
- Proportion: 3:5
- Adopted: 28 June 1967 (modified to current aspect ratio on 27 September 1982)
- Design: A white diagonal cross divided into four panels of red (top and bottom) and green (hoist-side and fly-side) with the white disk superimposed at the center of the cross bearing three red six-pointed stars with green outlines arranged in the triangular form (one above, two below).
- Designed by: Unknown

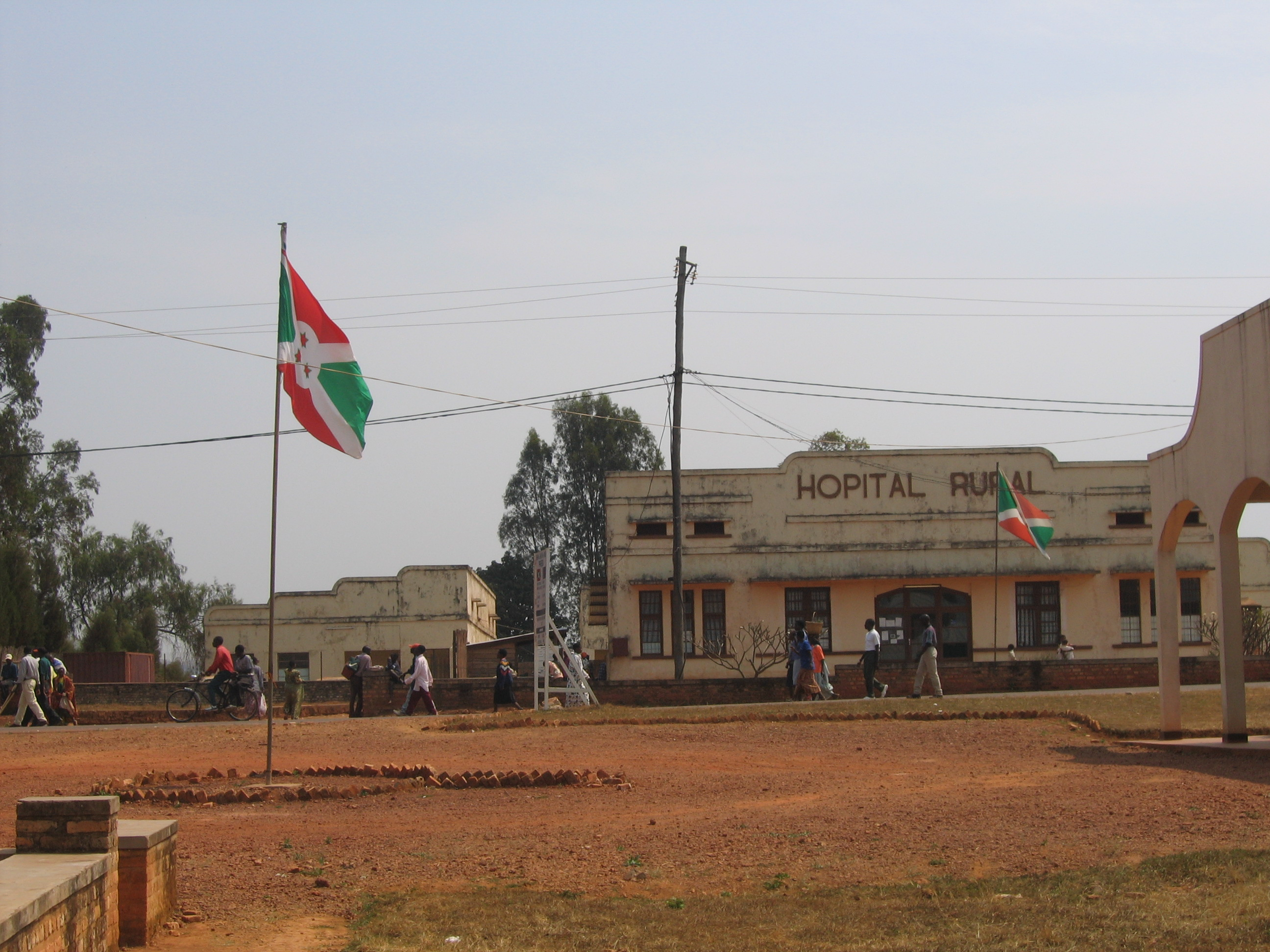
Burundi flag at Ruyigi Hospital

The original national flag of Burundi (Kirundi: ibendera ry'Uburundi, French: Drapeau du Burundi) was adopted after the Burundian independence from Belgium on 1 July 1962. It went through several revisions and now consists of a white saltire which divides the field into alternating red and green areas. The center of the saltire merges into a white disk, on which there are three red solid six-pointed stars outlined in green. The current ratio is 3:5, which was changed from 2:3 on 27 September 1982.

== Symbolism ==
The flag is divided into four parts by a white saltire. The upper and lower parts are red in color, while the left and right ones are green in color. The white color of the saltire represents peace, green represents the nation's hopes placed on future development, and red symbolizes the suffering of the nation during its freedom struggle. The three stars in triangular configuration stand for the three ethnic groups of Burundi: the Hutu, the Twa and the Tutsi. The three stars also stand for the three elements of the national motto: Ubumwe, Ibikorwa, Amajambere ("Unity, Work and Progress"), which can be seen on the coat of arms of Burundi. They also represent the loyalty that the citizens of the nation have pledged to their God, king and country.

== Colours ==
The colours are defined in the constitution as simply green, white, and red. Nowhere does the government document any specific colour shades. For lack of any official standard, the colours used at the 2012 Olympics are shown in the table below.

Colours scheme	White	Red	Green
Pantone	White	186 C	361 C
CMYK	0-0-0-0	0-92-77-22	62-0-76-31
HEX	#FFFFFF	#C8102E	#43B02A
RGB	255-255-255	200-16-46	67-176-42

== Construction sheet ==
Flag construction sheet.

== History ==
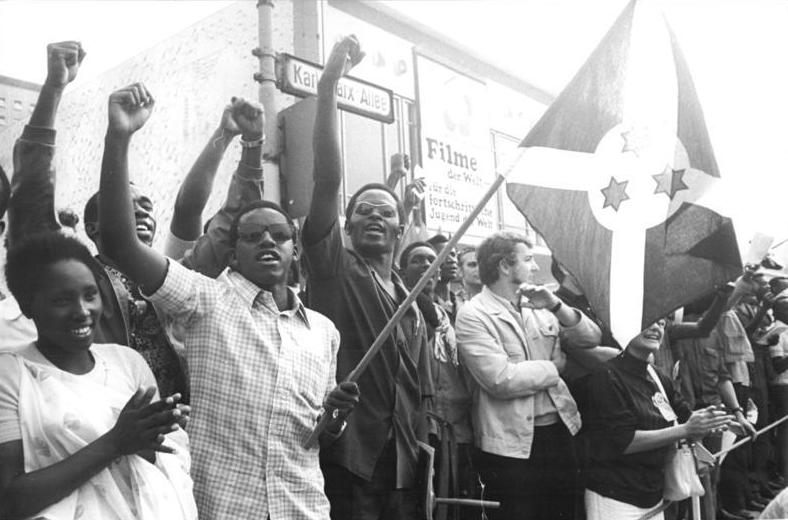
Burundi delegates at the 1973 World Festival of Youth and Students with the 1967–82 flag flown upside down

When the monarchy ruled over Burundi a variant flag featuring a karyenda (a drum said to have divine power) was used. It was believed that the drum's messages could be understood only by the mwami (rulers) who made it the laws of the state. Following the abolition of the monarchy in November 1966, the karyenda was removed from the flag and the other flag was adopted soon after. The karyenda was replaced with a sorghum plant which is an important agricultural product of the country.

Flag from 1 July 1962 to 28 November 1966 (Drum variant)

Flag from 1 July 1962 to 28 November 1966.

Royal standard from 1962 to 1966.

Flag used on 28 and 29 November 1966

Flag from 29 November 1966 to 28 June 1967

Flag from 28 June 1967 to 27 September 1982

The current national flag, adopted on 27 September 1982 features slightly different dimensions to the 1967 flag

== See also ==
- List of Burundian flags
