= 2025 World Athletics Indoor Tour =

Indoor track and field meetings

- Edition: 10th
- Dates: 2 January – 13 March 2025

The 2025 World Athletics Indoor Tour was the tenth edition of the World Athletics Indoor Tour, the highest series of international indoor track and field meetings.

The tour returned with the same number of meetings as the previous year, with 67 meetings across Europe, North America, and Asia, nine of which comprise the highest tier of events labelled Gold. Below the top tier, there were three other tiers labelled Silver, Bronze, and Challenger mirroring the outdoor World Athletics Continental Tour.

The international media rights for the tour was covered by Infront Sports & Media as part of a deal extending through the end of 2029.

For 2025, the Gold Level scoring disciplines were the men's 400m, 1500m, 60m hurdles, long jump, and high jump, as well as the women's 60m, 800m, 3000/5000m, triple jump, shot put and pole vault. Each athlete’s best three results counted toward their overall point score. The athlete with the most points in each scoring discipline at the end of the tour was declared the winner, and was offered a wild card entry for the 2025 World Athletics Indoor Championships.

== Meetings ==
Date	Meeting	Venue	Country
Gold Level Meetings (9)
25 Jan	Astana Indoor Meet for Amin Tuyakov Prizes	Astana	Kazakhstan
29 Jan	Belgrade Indoor Meeting	Belgrade	Serbia
2 Feb	New Balance Indoor Grand Prix	Boston	United States
4 Feb	Czech Indoor Gala	Ostrava	Czech Republic
7 Feb	INIT Meeting Karlsruhe	Karlsruhe	Germany
8 Feb	Millrose Games	New York City	United States
13 Feb	Meeting Hauts-de-France Pas-de-Calais "Trophée EDF"	Liévin	France
16 Feb	ORLEN Copernicus Cup	Toruń	Poland
28 Feb	World Indoor Tour Gold Madrid	Madrid	Spain
Silver Level Meetings (17)
19 Jan	CMCM Indoor Meeting	Luxembourg	Luxembourg
24-25 Jan	Perche Elite Tour Rouen	Rouen	France
31 Jan	Elite Indoor Track Miramas Meeting	Miramas	France
31 Jan-1 Feb	Perch'Xtrem	Caen	France
1 Feb	International Tournament for the Prizes of Olga Rypakova	Ust-Kamenogorsk	Kazakhstan
2 Feb	Meeting de L'Eure	Val-de-Reuil	France
5 Feb	Beskyd bar	Třinec	Czech Republic
8 Feb	Hustopečské skákání	Hustopeče	Czech Republic
8 Feb	Metz Meeting Moselle Athlélor	Metz	France
8 Feb	Orlen Cup Łódź	Łódź	Poland
9 Feb	ISTAF Indoor Düsseldorf	Düsseldorf	Germany
9 Feb	Meeting de Paris Indoor	Paris	France
14 Feb	ISTAF Indoor	Berlin	Germany
15 Feb	Meeting Indoor de Lyon	Lyon	France
18 Feb	Banskobystrická latka	Banská Bystrica	Slovakia
19 Feb	Hvězdy v Nehvizdech	Nehvizdy	Czech Republic
28 Feb-1 Mar	All Star Perche	Clermont-Ferrand	France
13 Mar	Mondo Classic	Uppsala	Sweden
Bronze Level Meetings (19)
18 Jan	Sparkassen Indoor Meeting Dortmund	Dortmund	Germany
18 Jan	Starpeche	Bordeaux	France
21 Jan	Aarhus SPRINT’n’JUMP	Århus	Denmark
25 Jan	Dr. Sander Invitational	New York City	United States
25 Jan	Jablonec Indoor	Jablonec nad Nisou	Czech Republic
25 Jan	Meeting Indoor Nantes Métropole	Nantes	France
29 Jan	GP Jyväskylä Indoor	Jyväskylä	Finland
29 Jan	International Jump Meeting Cottbus	Cottbus	Germany
30 Jan	Gorzów Jump Festival	Wielkopolski	Poland
31 Jan	Medavie Indoor Invitational	Saint John	Canada
31 Jan-1 Feb	PNC Lenny Lyles Invitational	Louisville	United States
1 Feb	IFAM Gent Indoor	Gent	Belgium
6 Feb	Tampere Indoor Meeting	Tampere	Finland
6 Feb	Udin Jump Development	Udine	Italy
7 Feb	BKK Freundenburg High Jump Meeting	Weinheim	Germany
7 Feb	Meeting Ciudad de Valencia	Valencia	Spain
7-8 Feb	Doc Hale Virginia Tech Invitational	Blacksburg	United States
11-12 Feb	Memorial Josip Gasparac	Osijek	Croatia
15 Feb	Keely Klassic	Birmingham	Great Britain
15 Feb	Perche en Or	Roubaix	France
Challenger Level Meetings (22)
2 Jan	Pole Vault GP Tallinn	Tallinn	Estonia
10 Jan	Miting Catalunya	Sabadell	Spain
11 Jan	Univers Perche	Superdévoluy	France
12 Jan	Loughborough Indoor Pole Vault Memorial	Loughborough	Great Britain
12 Jan	Stabhochsprung Stars 2025	Frauenfeld	Switzerland
18 Jan	Česká tyčka	Prague	Czech Republic
18 Jan	Meeting Internacional de Ourense	Ourense	Spain
18 Jan	Memorial Alessio Giovannini	Ancona	Italy
18 Jan	Meeting de Saut en Hauter d'Hirson	Hirson	France
18 Jan	Vaggelis Kourkoutidis Memorial	Thessaloniki	Greece
22 Jan	Otrokovice Jump	Otrokovice	Czech Republic
25 Jan	Inter Hallenmeeting	Chemnitz	Germany
25 Jan	Nordhausen Indoor Kugelstossen	Nordhausen	Germany
26 Jan	Meeting Moniz Pereira	Pombal	Portugal
31 Jan	Breningeer Hallenmeeting Erfurt Indoor	Erfurt	Germany
1 Feb	Meeting 3 Sauts	Amiens	France
1 Feb	Vault Manchester	Manchester	Great Britain
2 Feb	Rochlitz Shot Put Meeting	Rochlitz	Germany
2 Feb	scottishathletics EAP Indoor Invitational	Glasgow	Great Britain
8 Feb	International High Jump Gala Elmos	Heist-op-den-Berg	Belgium
13 Feb	Indoor Spike	Ostrava	Czech Republic
15 Feb	Bannister Winter Classic	Göteborg	Sweden

== Gold Tour results ==
non World Indoor Tour events

=== Men's track ===
#	Meeting	60 m	400 m	800 m	1500 m	3000 m	60 m h
1	Astana	Kishane Thompson (JAM) 6.56	Alex Haydock-Wilson (GBR) 46.45	-	Kristian Uldbjerg Hansen (DEN) 3:39.03 MR	-	Dylan Beard (USA) 7.58 =MR
2	Belgrade	Ronnie Baker (USA) 6.53 MR	Attila Molnár (HUN) 45.66 MR	-	Anass Essayi (MAR) 3:37.56 MR	-	-
3	Boston	Noah Lyles (USA) 6.52 SB	Quincy Wilson (USA) 45.66 PB	Bryce Hoppel (USA) 1:46.04	Josh Hoey (USA) 3:33.66 WL, PB	Andrew Coscoran (IRL) 7:30.75 WL, NR, PB	Grant Holloway (USA) 7.42 SB
4	Ostrava	Ronnie Baker (USA) 6.50 SB	Attila Molnár (HUN) 45.08 WL, MR, NR, PB	Eliott Crestan (BEL) 1:44.69 MR, NR, PB	Isaac Nader (POR) 3:54.17 MR, PB (Mile)	-	-
5	Karlsruhe	-	Brian Faust (USA) 46.03 MR, SB	-	Samuel Pihlström (SWE) 3:35.62 SB	Stefan Nillessen (NED) 7:37.10 NR, PB	Wilhem Belocian (FRA) 7:53
6	New York	Marcellus Moore (USA) 6.56 =PB	-	Josh Hoey (USA) 1:43.90 AR, WL, MR, PB	Yared Nuguse (USA) 3:46.63 WR (Mile)	Grant Fisher (USA) 7:22.91 WR	Dylan Beard (USA) 7.38 WL, MR, PB
7	Liévin	-	-	Eliott Crestan (BEL) 1:44.81	Azeddine Habz (FRA) 3:32.29 (1500 m); Jakob Ingebrigtsen (NOR) 3:45.14 WR (Mile)	Niels Laros (NED) 7:29.49 NR	Grant Holloway (USA) 7.36 WL
8	Toruń	-	-	Catalin Tecuceanu (ITA) 1:46.97	Elliot Giles (GBR) 3:35.43 SB	-	Louis Rollins (USA) 7.59
9	Madrid	-	Brian Faust (USA) 45.74 SB	Adrián Ben (ESP) 1:45.39 PB	Melese Nberet (ETH) 3:38.22	-	Enrique Llopis (ESP) 7.48 =NR
Overall		-	Brian Faust (USA); 25 pts	-	Samuel Pihlström (SWE); 20 pts	-	Wilhem Belocian (FRA); 24 pts

=== Men's field ===
#	Meeting	High jump	Long jump	Triple jump	Pole vault	Shot put
1	Astana	Luis Castro Rivera (PUR) 2.15 m MR	Lester Lescay (CUB) 7.91 m MR	-	-	-
2	Belgrade	-	Thobias Montler (SWE) 8.23 m	-	-	Roger Steen (USA) 20.94 m
3	Boston	Vernon Turner (USA) 2.19 m SB	-	-	-	-
4	Ostrava	-	Mattia Furlani (ITA) 8.23 m MR	-	-	Zane Weir (ITA) 21.39 m SB
5	Karlsruhe	-	-	-	-	-
6	New York	-	-	-	-	-
7	Liévin	-	Zhang Mingkun (CHN) 8.04 m	-	Ersu Şaşma (TUR) 5.90 m =NR	Leonardo Fabbri (ITA) 21.95 m WL
8	Toruń	-	Mattia Furlani (ITA) 8.37 m WL	-	EJ Obiena (PHI) 5.80 m SB	Leonardo Fabbri (ITA) 21.62 m
9	Madrid	-	-	Lazaro Martínez (CUB) 17.12 m SB	-	-
Overall		Luis Castro Rivera (PUR); 15 pts	Mattia Furlani (ITA); 20 pts	-	-	-

=== Women's track ===
#	Meeting	60 m	400 m	800 m	1500 m	3000 m	60 m h
1	Astana	Tia Clayton (JAM) 7.18 =MR	Sada Williams (BAR) 53.56	-	-	Marta Alemayo (ETH) 8:39.80 WU18R	Yumi Tanaka (JPN) 8.05
2	Belgrade	Zaynab Dosso (ITA) 7.12	-	Eloisa Coiro (ITA) 2:01.98	-	Meseret Yeshaneh (ETH) 8:56.32	Nadine Visser (NED) 7.86
3	Boston	Jacious Sears (USA) 7.11 SB	Julien Alfred (LCA) 36.16 NR (300 m); Raevyn Rogers (USA) 1:08.98 (500 m)	-	Heather Maclean (USA); 4:23.32 MR, PB (Mile)	Melissa Courtney-Bryant (GBR); 8:28.69 WL, PB	Masai Russell (USA) 7.80 SB
4	Ostrava	Patrizia van der Weken (LUX) 7.08	Lieke Klaver (NED) 50.92 WL	Gabriela Gajanová (SVK) 2:02.16	-	Freweyni Hailu (ETH) 8:24.17 WL, MR, PB	-
5	Karlsruhe	Patrizia van der Weken (LUX) 7.13	Alice Mangione (ITA) 51.75 NR, PB	Prudence Sekgodiso (RSA) 1:59.88 NR, PB	-	Lomi Mutela (ETH) 8:57.52	-
6	New York	Jacious Sears (USA) 7.02 WL, PB	Alexis Holmes (USA) 51.21	Shafiqua Maloney (SVG) 1:59.07	Georgia Bell (GBR); 4:23.35 PB (Mile)	Whittni Morgan (USA) 8:28.03 PB	Masai Russell (USA) 7.76 WL
7	Liévin	-	Lieke Klaver (NED) 50.76 WL	Tsige Duguma (ETH) 1:59.02	Diribe Welteji (ETH) 3:58.89 WL	Freweyni Hailu (ETH) 8:19.98 WL, PB	Ackera Nugent (JAM) 7.75 MR, WL
8	Toruń	Zaynab Dosso (ITA) 7.05 SB	Henriette Jæger (NOR) 50.44 WL, MR, NR	Tsige Duguma (ETH) 2:00.04	Gudaf Tsegay (ETH) 3:53.92 WL, MR	-	Ackera Nugent (JAM) 7.79 =MR
9	Madrid	Patrizia van der Weken (LUX) 7.09	-	Anita Horvat (SLO) 2:00.35 SB	-	Birke Haylom (ETH) 8:38.45	-
Overall		Patrizia van der Weken (LUX); 30 pts	-	Tsige Duguma (ETH); 20 pts	-	Freweyni Hailu (ETH); 20 pts	-

=== Women's field ===
#	Meeting	High jump	Long jump	Triple jump	Pole vault	Shot put
1	Astana	Nagisa Takahashi (JPN) 1.88 m	-	Neja Filipič (SLO) 14.05 m MR	-	Chase Jackson (USA) 19.13 m MR. WL
2	Belgrade	-	-	-	-	-
3	Boston	-	-	Jasmine Moore (USA) 13.89 m	-	-
4	Ostrava	-	-	-	Tina Šutej (SLO) 4.70 m	-
5	Karlsruhe	-	Malaika Mihambo (GER) 7.07 m WL, MR	-	Molly Caudery (GBR) 4.75 m	Sarah Mitton (CAN) 20.68 m WL, MR, =NR
6	New York	-	-	-	Katie Moon (USA) 4.82 m WL	-
7	Liévin	-	-	Leyanis Pérez Hernández (CUB) 14.62 m WL	Katie Moon (USA) 4.83 m WL	-
8	Toruń	-	-	-	-	Chase Jackson (USA) 20.24 m MR, SB
9	Madrid	-	-	Leyanis Pérez Hernández (CUB) 14.42 m	Molly Caudery (GBR) 4.85 m SB	Chase Jackson (USA) 19.48 m
Overall		-	-	Leyanis Pérez Hernández (CUB); 20 pts	Molly Caudery (GBR); 27 pts	Chase Jackson (USA); 30 pts
