= 2024 World Athletics Indoor Tour =

Indoor track and field meetings

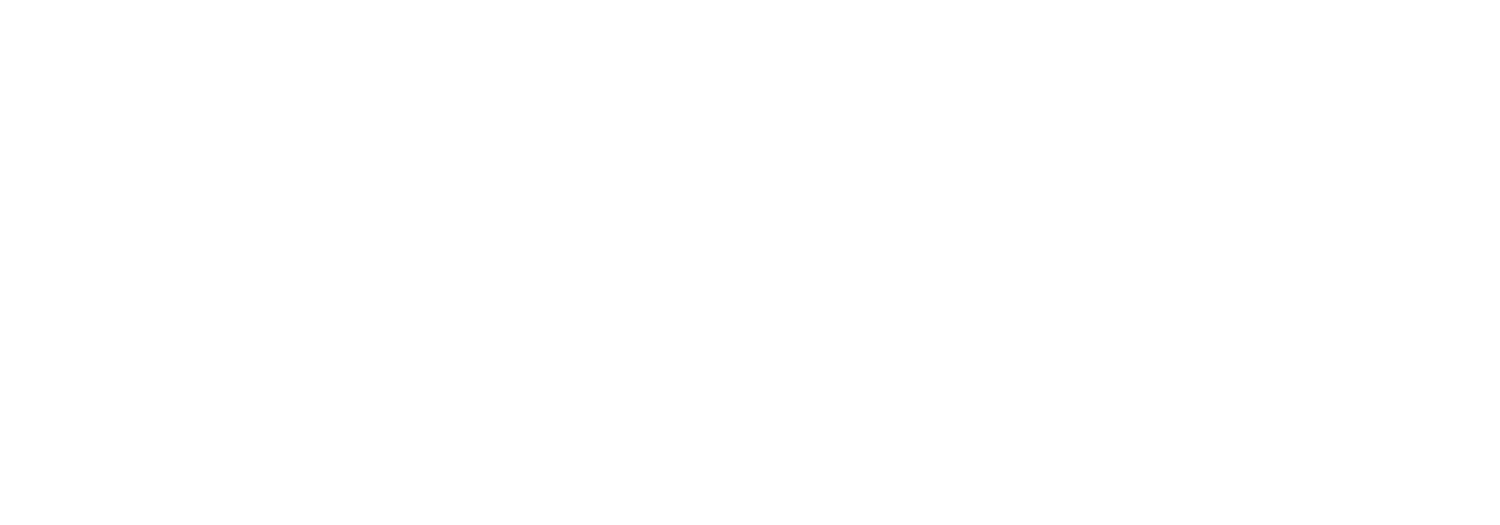
- Edition: 9th
- Dates: 29 December 2023 – 24 February 2024

The 2024 World Athletics Indoor Tour was the ninth edition of the World Athletics Indoor Tour, the highest series of international indoor track and field meetings.

The tour returned with the same number of meetings as the previous year, with 54 meetings across Europe, North America, and Asia, seven of which comprise the highest tier of events labelled Gold. Below the top tier, there were three other tiers labelled Silver, Bronze, and Challenger mirroring the outdoor World Athletics Continental Tour.

The international media rights for the tour was covered by Infront Sports & Media as part of a deal extending through the end of 2029.

For 2024, the Gold level scoring disciplines were the men's 60m, 800m, 3000/5000m, triple jump, shot put and pole vault, as well as the women's 400m, 1500m, 60m hurdles, long jump, and high jump. The 2024 edition of the tour was formally announced on 27 October 2023.

== Meetings ==
Date	Meeting	Venue	Country
Gold Level Meetings (7)
27 Jan	Astana Indoor Meet for Amin Tuyakov Prizes	Astana	Kazakhstan
30 Jan	Czech Indoor Gala	Ostrava	Czech Republic
4 Feb	New Balance Indoor Grand Prix	Boston	United States
6 Feb	ORLEN Copernicus Cup	Toruń	Poland
10 Feb	Meeting Hauts-de-France Pas-de-Calais "Trophée EDF"	Liévin	France
11 Feb	Millrose Games	New York City	United States
23 Feb	World Indoor Tour Gold Madrid	Madrid	Spain
Silver Level Meetings (16)
28 Jan	Meeting de L'Eure	Val-de-Reuil	France
2 Feb	Elite Indoor Track Miramas Meeting	Miramas	France
3 Feb	Metz Meeting Moselle Athlélor	Metz	France
4 Feb	ISTAF Indoor Düsseldorf	Düsseldorf	Germany
6 Feb	Mondo Classic	Uppsala	Sweden
7 Feb	Beskydská laťka	Třinec	Czech Republic
7 Feb	Mondeville Meeting	Mondeville	France
9 Feb	Meeting Indoor de Lyon	Lyon	France
10 Feb	Hustopečské skákání	Hustopeče	Czech Republic
11 Feb	Meeting de Paris Indoor	Paris	France
13 Feb	Banskobystrická latka	Banská Bystrica	Slovakia
13 Feb	Belgrade Indoor Meeting	Beograd	Serbia
20 Feb	Hvězdy v Nehvizdech	Nehvizdy	Czech Republic
21 Feb	All Star Perche by SCC	Clermont-Ferrand	France
23 Feb	ISTAF Indoor	Berlin	Germany
24 Feb	Perche Elite Tour Rouen	Rouen	France
Bronze Level Meetings (15)
20 Jan	Jablonec Indoor	Jablonec nad Nisou	Czech Republic
20 Jan	Sparkassen Indoor Meeting Dortmund	Dortmund	Germany
20 Jan	VIII International Athletics Tournament - Olga Rypakova Prizes	Ust-Kamenogorsk	Kazakhstan
21 Jan	CMCM Indoor Meeting	Luxembourg	Luxembourg
23 Jan	Aarhus SPRINT’n’JUMP	Århus	Denmark
23 Jan	Tampere Indoor Meeting	Tampere	Finland
26 Jan	PNC Lenny Lyles Invitational	Louisville	United States
27 Jan	Dr. Sander Invitational	New York	United States
27 Jan	Meeting Indoor Nantes Métropole	Nantes	France
27 Jan	Orlen Cup Łódź	Łódź	Poland
31 Jan	International Jump Meeting Cottbus	Cottbus	Germany
2 Feb	BKK Freundenburg High Jump Meeting	Weinheim	Germany
3 Feb	Folksam GP Stockholm Indoor	Stockholm	Sweden
3 Feb	IFAM Gent Indoor	Gent	Belgium
20 Feb	Memorial Josip Gasparac	Osijek	Croatia
Challenger Level Meetings (22)
29 Dec	Navarra Indoor Athletics	Pamplona	Spain
13 Jan	Univers Perche	Dévoluy	France
20 Jan	4.Stadtwerk-Hallenmeeting powered by 1080 Bausysteme	St. Gallen	Switzerland
20 Jan	Kuldiga Catherine's Cup	Kuldiga	Latvia
20 Jan	Starperche	Bordeaux	France
27 Jan	Biel/Bienne Athletics Hallenmeeting	Magglingen	Switzerland
27 Jan	Inter Hallenmeeting	Chemnitz	Germany
27 Jan	Miting Catalunya	Sabadell	Spain
28 Jan	Elán Miting	Bratislava	Slovakia
28 Jan	Nordhausen Indoor Kugelstossen	Nordhausen	Germany
2 Feb	Breningeer Hallenmeeting Erfurt Indoor	Erfurt	Germany
3 Feb	Meeting 3 Sauts	Amiens	France
4 Feb	Rochlitz Shot Put Meeting	Rochlitz	Germany
6 Feb	Udin Jump Development	Udine	Italy
7 Feb	Meeting Ciudad de Valencia	Valencia	Spain
10 Feb	International High Jump Gala Elmos	Heist-op-den-Berg	Belgium
11 Feb	Nordic indoor match	Rud	Norway
11 Feb	Stabhochsprung Stars	Frauenfeld	Switzerland
14 Feb	Perche en Or	Roubaix	France
14 Feb	PNG Valentine Meet / Indoor	Turku	Finland
27 Feb	Chinese Indoor GP Series 1	Chengdu	China
2 Mar	Chinese Indoor GP Series 2	Xi'an	China

== Results : Gold Tour ==
non World Indoor Tour events

=== Men's track ===
#	Meeting	60 m	400 m	800 m	1500 m	3000 m	60 m h
1	Astana	Demek Kemp (USA); 6.55	Iñaki Cañal (ESP); 46.36	-	-	Samuel Tefera (ETH); 7:33.80	Junxi Liu (CHN); 7.58
2	Ostrava	Yoshihide Kiryū (JPN); 6.53	Vít Müller (CZE); 46.26	Tshepiso Masalela (BOT); 1:46.41	Isaac Nader (POR); 3:34.24	-	-
3	Boston	Noah Lyles (USA); 6.44	Vernon Norwood (USA); 45.76	-	-Hobbs Kessler (USA); 3:33.66	Lamecha Girma (ETH); 7:29.09	Grant Holloway (USA); 7.35
4	Toruń	Jeremiah Azu (GBR); 6.57	-	Tshepiso Masalela (BOT); 1:46.07	-Samuel Tefera (ETH); 3:34.61	Selemon Barega (ETH); 7:25.82	Jakub Szymański (POL); 7.48
5	Liévin	-	-	Eliott Crestan (BEL); 1:45.10	Azeddine Habz (FRA); 3:34.39	Selemon Barega (ETH); 7:31.38	Grant Holloway (USA); 7.32
6	New York	Christian Coleman (USA); 6.51	-	Bryce Hoppel (USA); 1:45.54	Yared Nuguse (USA); 3:47.83 (Mile)	Josh Kerr (GBR); 8:00.67 (2 Miles)	Dylan Beard (USA); 7.44
7	Madrid	-	-	Catalin Tecuceanu (ITA); 1:45.00	-	Narve Gilje Nordås (NOR); 7:41.28	Lorenzo Simonelli (ITA); 7.46
Overall		Jeremiah Azu (GBR); 13 pts	-	Catalin Tecuceanu (ITA); 22 pts	-	Selemon Barega (ETH); 20 pts	-

=== Men's field ===
#	Meeting	High jump	Long jump	Triple jump	Pole vault	Shot put
1	Astana	-	-	-	Armand Duplantis (SWE); 5.80 m	Scott Lincoln (GBR); 20.81 m
2	Ostrava	-	Miltiadis Tentoglou (GRE); 8.09 m	-	-	Roger Steen (USA); 21.38 m
3	Boston	-	Carey McLeod (JAM); 8.20 m	-	-	-
4	Toruń	-	-	Andy Díaz (ITA); 17.61 m	Piotr Lisek (POL); 5.75 m	-
5	Liévin	-	-	Hugues Fabrice Zango (BUR); 17.21 m	Sam Kendricks (USA); 5.76 m	Leonardo Fabbri (ITA); 22.37 m
6	New York	-	-	-	Chris Nilsen (USA); 5.82 m	-
7	Madrid	-	-	Jordan Díaz (ESP); 17.52 m	Piotr Lisek (POL); 5.70 m	Rajindra Campbell (JAM); 22.16 m
Overall				Yasser Triki (ALG); 17 pts	Piotr Lisek (POL); 25 pts	Tom Walsh (NZL); 19 pts

=== Women's track ===
#	Meeting	60 m	400 m	800 m	1500 m	3000 m	60 m h
1	Astana	Anthonique Strachan (BAH); 7.08	Cátia Azevedo (POR); 52.64	-	Diribe Welteji (ETH); 4:23.76 (Mile)	-	Tobi Amusan (NGR); 7.77
2	Ostrava	Ewa Swoboda (POL); 7.07	Lieke Klaver (NED); 50.54	-	Freweyni Hailu (ETH); 4:17.36 (Mile)	-	Pia Skrzyszowska (POL); 7.82
3	Boston	Mikiah Brisco (USA); 7.10	Kendall Ellis (USA); 52.77	Samantha Watson (USA); 2:01.20	Gudaf Tsegay (ETH); 3:58.11	Jessica Hull (AUS); 8:24.93	Tia Jones (USA); 7.72
4	Toruń	Ewa Swoboda (POL); 7.01	Lieke Klaver (NED); 50.57	Habitam Alemu (ETH); 1:57.86	Freweyni Hailu (ETH); 3:55.28	-	Nadine Visser (NED); 7.80
5	Liévin	-	Femke Bol (NED); 49.63	Jemma Reekie (GBR); 2:00.40	Freweyni Hailu (ETH); 3:57.24	Gudaf Tsegay (ETH); 8:17.11	Tobi Amusan (NGR); 7.83
6	New York	Julien Alfred (LCA); 6.99	-	Allie Wilson (USA); 2:00.40	Elle Purrier (USA); 4:16.41 (Mile)	Laura Muir (GBR); 9:04.84 (2 Miles)	Devynne Charlton (BAH); 7.67
7	Madrid	-	Andrea Miklós (ROU); 51.11	Worknesh Mesele (ETH); 2:01.01	Ludovica Cavalli (ITA); 4:07.01	-	Devynne Charlton (BAH); 7.68
Overall		-	Lieke Klaver (NED); 27 pts	-	Freweyni Hailu (ETH); 30 pts	-	Devynne Charlton (BAH); 28 pts

=== Women's field ===
#	Meeting	High jump	Long jump	Triple jump	Pole vault	Shot put
1	Astana	Urtė Baikštytė (LIT); 1.92 m	Milica Gardašević (SRB); 6.45 m	-	-	-
2	Ostrava	-	-	-	Tina Šutej (SLO); 4.73 m	-
3	Boston	-	Tara Davis-Woodhall (USA); 6.86 m	-	-	-
4	Toruń	-	-	-	-	-
5	Liévin	-	-	-	Eliza McCartney (NZL); 4.83 m	-
6	New York	Yaroslava Mahuchikh (UKR); 2.00 m	-	-	-	-
7	Madrid	Lia Apostolovski (SLO); 1.89 m	Florentina Costina Iusco (ROM); 6.65 m	-	-	-
Overall		Urtė Baikštytė (LIT); 10 pts	Milica Gardašević (SRB); 17 pts	-	-	-
