= 2024 World Athletics Indoor Championships – Men's 60 metres =

Men's 60 metres at the 2024 World Athletics Indoor Championships
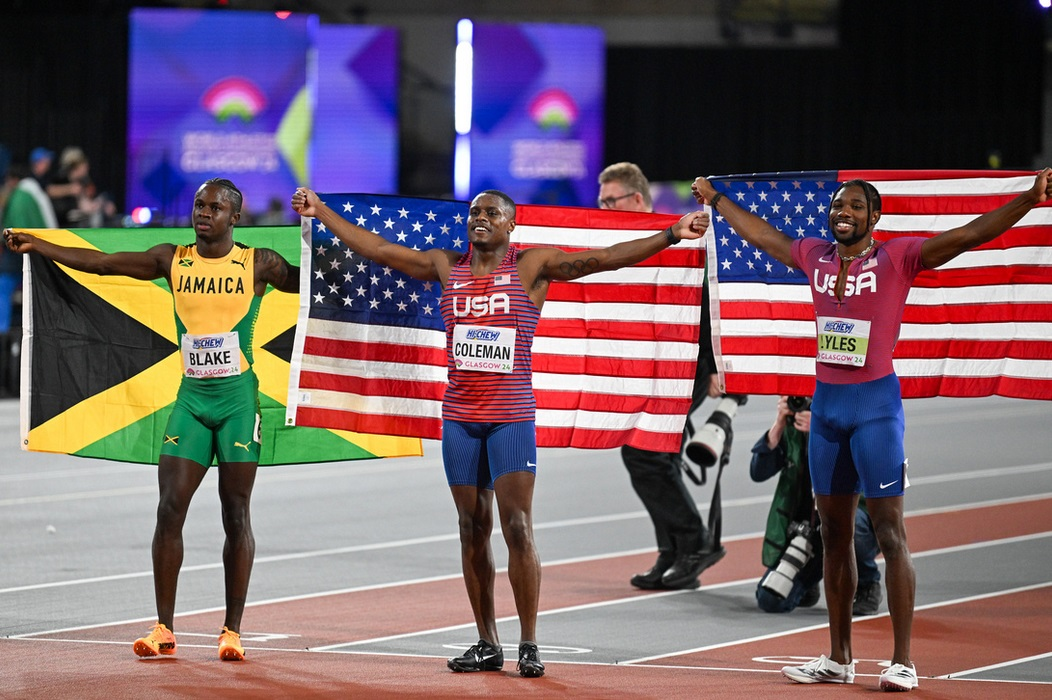
- Venue: Commonwealth Arena
- Dates: 1 March
- Competitors: 50 from 45 nations
- Winning time: 6.41

Medalists
gold medal	Christian Coleman	United States
silver medal	Noah Lyles	United States
bronze medal	Ackeem Blake	Jamaica

The men's 60 metres at the 2024 World Athletics Indoor Championships took place on 1 March 2024.

== Results ==
=== Heats ===
The heats were started at 12:58. First three of each heat (Q) and the next three fastest times (q) qualified for the semi-finals.

==== Heat 1 ====
Place	Lane	Athlete	Nation	Time	Notes
1	3	Noah Lyles	United States	6.57	Q
2	4	Jeff Erius	France	6.63	Q
3	2	Aleksandar Ašković	Germany	6.66 [.651]	Q
4	6	Markus Fuchs	Austria	6.66 [.657]	q
5	5	Tiaan Whelpton	New Zealand	6.67	SB
6	7	Waisake Tewa	Fiji	7.02	PB
7	8	Scott James Fiti	Federated States of Micronesia	7.52	PB

==== Heat 2 ====
Place	Lane	Athlete	Nation	Time	Notes
1	3	Henrik Larsson	Sweden	6.59	Q, =SB
2	6	Malachi Murray	Canada	6.64	Q
3	5	Kayhan Özer	Turkey	6.71	Q
4	4	Samuele Ceccarelli	Italy	6.77	
5	1	Janosh Moncherry	Seychelles	6.91	PB
6	2	Hassan Saaid	Maldives	6.93	SB
7	7	Guillem Arderiu Vilanova	Andorra	7.03	PB
8	8	Manuihei Teaha	French Polynesia	7.25	PB

==== Heat 3 ====
Place	Lane	Athlete	Nation	Time	Notes
1	2	Chituru Ali	Italy	6.59	Q
2	3	Emmanuel Matadi	Liberia	6.60	Q
3	5	Sergio López	Spain	6.68	Q
4	6	Israel Olatunde	Ireland	6.70	SB
5	4	Erik Cardoso	Brazil	6.87	
6	8	Ignacio Blaluk	Palau	7.38	PB
—	—	Dominique Lasconi Mulamba	Democratic Republic of the Congo	DNS	

==== Heat 4 ====
Place	Lane	Athlete	Nation	Time	Notes
1	3	Ferdinand Omanyala	Kenya	6.52 [.512]	Q
2	6	Shuhei Tada	Japan	6.52 [.514]	Q, NR
3	7	Marc Brian Louis	Singapore	6.69	Q, NR
4	5	Ioannis Nyfantopoulos	Greece	6.74	
5	4	Brendon Rodney	Canada	6.80	
6	2	Karalo Maibuca	Tuvalu	7.27	NR
7	8	Ty'ree Langidrik	Marshall Islands	7.63	PB

==== Heat 5 ====
Place	Lane	Athlete	Nation	Time	Notes
1	3	Emmanuel Eseme	Cameroon	6.54	Q, NR
2	6	Simon Hansen	Denmark	6.61	Q
3	4	Anej Čurin Prapotnik	Slovenia	6.68 [.671]	Q
4	5	Felipe Bardi	Brazil	6.68 [.678]	
5	7	Ambdoul Karim Riffayn	Comoros	6.75	PB
6	2	Craig Gill	Gibraltar	7.17	
7	8	Winzar Kakiouea	Nauru	7.18	PB

==== Heat 6 ====
Place	Lane	Athlete	Nation	Time	Notes
1	4	Christian Coleman	United States	6.49	Q
2	2	Mario Burke	Barbados	6.58	Q
3	5	Akihiro Higashida	Japan	6.62 [.614]	Q
4	6	Rikkoi Brathwaite	British Virgin Islands	6.62 [.615]	q, SB
5	3	Pascal Mancini	Switzerland	6.63	q, =SB
6	8	Joseph Green	Guam	7.04	NR
7	7	Daniel Tolosa	Cook Islands	7.23	=NR

==== Heat 7 ====
Place	Lane	Athlete	Nation	Time	Notes
1	3	Ackeem Blake	Jamaica	6.55	Q
2	6	Ján Volko	Slovakia	6.59	Q
3	4	Imranur Rahman	Bangladesh	6.64	Q
4	5	Samuli Samuelsson	Finland	6.72	
5	7	Sibusiso Matsenjwa	Eswatini	6.74	
6	2	Shajar Abbas	Pakistan	6.77	
7	8	Sanjay Weekes	Montserrat	7.12	PB

=== Semi-finals ===
The semi-finals were started at 19:45. First two of each heat (Q) and the next two fastest times (q) qualified for the final.

==== Heat 1 ====
Place	Lane	Athlete	Nation	Time	Notes
1	4	Christian Coleman	United States	6.43	Q, WL
2	6	Chituru Ali	Italy	6.53	Q, PB
3	5	Henrik Larsson	Sweden	6.55	q, SB
4	1	Markus Fuchs	Austria	6.58	PB
5	3	Simon Hansen	Denmark	6.62	
6	7	Jeff Erius	France	6.63	
7	8	Sergio López	Spain	6.70	
8	2	Anej Čurin Prapotnik	Slovenia	6.71	

==== Heat 2 ====
Place	Lane	Athlete	Nation	Time	Notes
1	4	Ackeem Blake	Jamaica	6.51	Q
2	5	Emmanuel Eseme	Cameroon	6.52	Q, NR
3	3	Mario Burke	Barbados	6.57	
4	1	Rikkoi Brathwaite	British Virgin Islands	6.60 [.592]	SB
5	6	Ján Volko	Slovakia	6.60 [.596]	
6	8	Kayhan Özer	Turkey	6.65	
7	7	Akihiro Higashida	Japan	6.67	
8	2	Imranur Rahman	Bangladesh	6.70	

==== Heat 3 ====
Place	Lane	Athlete	Nation	Time	Notes
1	6	Noah Lyles	United States	6.47	Q
2	3	Ferdinand Omanyala	Kenya	6.52	Q
3	4	Shuhei Tada	Japan	6.56	q
4	5	Emmanuel Matadi	Liberia	6.58	
5	8	Pascal Mancini	Switzerland	6.62	SB
6	7	Aleksandar Ašković	Germany	6.66	
7	2	Malachi Murray	Canada	6.73 [.722]	
8	1	Marc Brian Louis	Singapore	6.73 [.726]	

=== Final ===
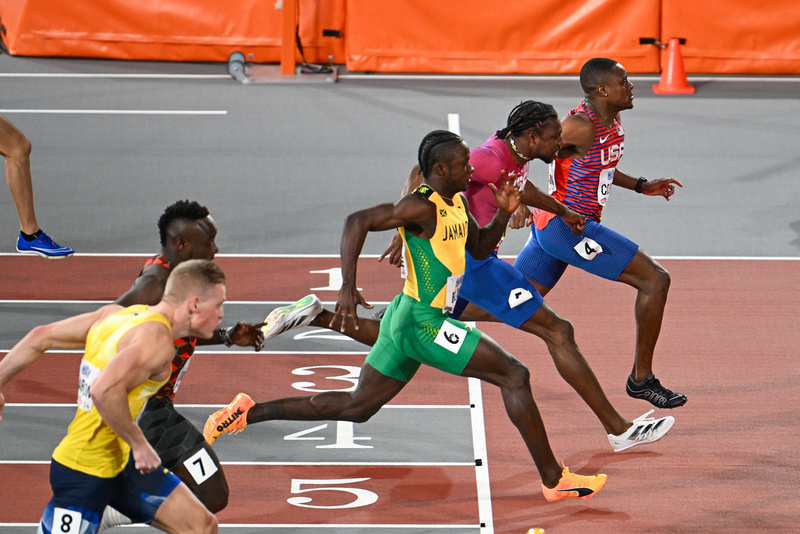
The final

The final was started at 21:46.

Place	Lane	Athlete	Nation	Time	Notes
1st place, gold medalist(s)	4	Christian Coleman	United States	6.41	WL
2nd place, silver medalist(s)	5	Noah Lyles	United States	6.44	
3rd place, bronze medalist(s)	6	Ackeem Blake	Jamaica	6.46	
4	7	Ferdinand Omanyala	Kenya	6.56 [.552]	
5	8	Henrik Larsson	Sweden	6.56 [.560]	
6	3	Emmanuel Eseme	Cameroon	6.68	
7	1	Shuhei Tada	Japan	6.70	
8	2	Chituru Ali	Italy	8.00	
