= 2024 Astana Indoor Meeting =

Athletics meeting in Astana, Kazakhstan

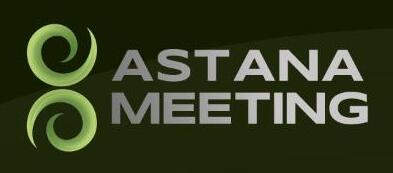
- Dates: 27 January 2024
- Host city: Astana, Kazakhstan
- Venue: Qazaqstan Indoor Track and Field Arena
- Level: 2024 World Athletics Indoor Tour

The 2024 Astana Indoor Meeting, officially the Astana Indoor Meet for Amin Tuyakov Prizes, was the 2nd edition of the annual indoor track and field meeting in Astana, Kazakhstan. Held on 27 January, it was the first leg of the 2024 World Athletics Indoor Tour Gold – the highest-level international indoor track and field circuit.

It was the first World Athletics Indoor Tour Gold level meeting to be held in Asia. Tamara Duisenova, the Deputy Prime Minister of Kazakhstan, was in attendance, as well as the Astana mayor Zhenis Kassymbek.

Mondo Duplantis won the pole vault in his season opener, clearing 5.80 m but failing all his attempts at 6.00 m.

== Results ==
=== World Athletics Indoor Tour ===
Men's 60m
Place	Athlete	Country	Time	Points
1st place, gold medalist(s)	Demek Kemp	United States	6.55	10
2nd place, silver medalist(s)	Shuhei Tada	Japan	6.58	7
3rd place, bronze medalist(s)	Akihiro Higashida	Japan	6.59	5
4	Richard Kilty	Great Britain	6.62	3
5	Rohan Watson	Jamaica	6.65	
6	Andre De Grasse	Canada	6.66	
7	Ján Volko	Slovakia	6.72	
8	Tosin Ogunode	Qatar	6.73	

Men's 60m Round 1
Place	Athlete	Country	Time	Heat
1	Demek Kemp	United States	6.58	1
2	Shuhei Tada	Japan	6.59	2
3	Akihiro Higashida	Japan	6.62	1
4	Andre De Grasse	Canada	6.65	1
5	Richard Kilty	Great Britain	6.68	2
6	Rohan Watson	Jamaica	6.69	1
7	Ján Volko	Slovakia	6.70	1
8	Tosin Ogunode	Qatar	6.70	2
9	Markus Fuchs	Austria	6.71	2
10	Almat Tulebaev	Kazakhstan	6.80	2
11	Favoris Muzrapov	Tajikistan	6.82	2
12	Ildar Akhmadiev	Tajikistan	6.83	1
13	Danil Popov	Kazakhstan	6.88	1
14	Witali Sems	Kazakhstan	6.88	2
15	Michael Dickson	United States	6.98	1

Men's Pole Vault
Place	Athlete	Country	Mark	Points
1st place, gold medalist(s)	Armand Duplantis	Sweden	5.80 m	10
2nd place, silver medalist(s)	Ben Broeders	Belgium	5.70 m	7
3rd place, bronze medalist(s)	Zhong Tao	China	5.60 m	5
4	Cole Walsh	United States	5.60 m	3
5	Oleg Zernikel	Germany	5.50 m	
6	Shingo Sawa	Japan	5.35 m	
7	Urho Kujanpää	Finland	5.35 m	
8	Danil Polyanskiy	Kazakhstan	4.80 m	

Men's Shot Put
Place	Athlete	Country	Mark	Points
1st place, gold medalist(s)	Scott Lincoln	Great Britain	20.81 m	10
2nd place, silver medalist(s)	Roger Steen (shot putter)	United States	20.58 m	7
3rd place, bronze medalist(s)	Eric Favors	Ireland	20.18 m	5
4	Francisco Belo	Portugal	19.75 m	3
5	Mohammed Tolo	Saudi Arabia	19.52 m	
6	Ivan Ivanov	Kazakhstan	18.67 m	
7	Piotr Goździewicz	Poland	18.15 m	

Women's 400m
Place	Athlete	Country	Time	Heat	Points
1st place, gold medalist(s)	Cátia Azevedo	Portugal	52.64	2	10
2nd place, silver medalist(s)	Sophie Becker	Ireland	53.19	2	7
3rd place, bronze medalist(s)	Stephenie Ann McPherson	Jamaica	54.66	2	5
4	Nanako Matsumoto	Japan	54.79	1	3
5	Maja Ćirić	Serbia	54.80	1	
6	Kristina Korjagina	Kazakhstan	55.65	2	
7	Laylo Allaberganova	Uzbekistan	55.97	1	
8	Adelina Zems	Kazakhstan	56.55	1	
9	Marija Schuwalowa	Kazakhstan	57.53	1	
10	Anna Schumilo	Kazakhstan	57.72	2	
11	Kristina Pronzhenko	Tajikistan	58.66	1	

Women's Mile
Place	Athlete	Country	Time	Points
1st place, gold medalist(s)	Diribe Welteji	Ethiopia	4:23.76	10
2nd place, silver medalist(s)	Gela Hambese	Ethiopia	4:24.44	7
3rd place, bronze medalist(s)	Axumawit Embaye	Ethiopia	4:25.42	5
4	Dahdi Dube	Ethiopia	4:27.06	3
5	Weronika Lizakowska	Poland	4:34.03	
6	Marissa Damink	Netherlands	4:35.13	
7	Vera Hoffmann	Luxembourg	4:35.79	
8	Vera Coutellier	Germany	4:35.93	
9	Lenuta Simiuc	Romania	4:36.13	
10	Fedra Luna	Argentina	4:36.51	
	Josephine Chelangat Kiplangat	Kenya	DNF	

Women's 60mH
Place	Athlete	Country	Time	Points
1st place, gold medalist(s)	Tobi Amusan	Nigeria	7.77	10
2nd place, silver medalist(s)	Nia Ali	United States	7.89	7
3rd place, bronze medalist(s)	Sarah Lavin	Ireland	7.91	5
4	Amber Hughes	United States	7.92	3
5	Megan Tapper	Jamaica	8.03	
6	Karin Strametz	Austria	8.05	
7	Cortney Jones	United States	8.07	
8	Amoi Brown	Jamaica	8.11	

Women's 60mH Round 1
Place	Athlete	Country	Time	Heat
1	Tobi Amusan	Nigeria	7.91	2
2	Sarah Lavin	Ireland	7.93	2
3	Nia Ali	United States	7.99	1
4	Amber Hughes	United States	8.01	1
5	Karin Strametz	Austria	8.04	1
6	Cortney Jones	United States	8.05	2
7	Megan Tapper	Jamaica	8.07	1
8	Amoi Brown	Jamaica	8.10	2
9	Alaysha Johnson	United States	8.17	2
10	Evonne Britton	United States	8.18	1
11	Milica Emini	Serbia	8.23	1
12	Binbin Wu	China	8.25	1
13	Lidiya Podtsepkina	Uzbekistan	8.38	2
14	Anel Shulakova	Kazakhstan	8.63	2
15	Alina Tschistjakowa	Kazakhstan	8.87	1
	Julija Baschmanowa	Kazakhstan	DQ	2

Women's High Jump
Place	Athlete	Country	Mark	Points
1st place, gold medalist(s)	Urtė Baikštytė	Lithuania	1.92 m	10
2nd place, silver medalist(s)	Nadezhda Dubovitskaya	Kazakhstan	1.90 m	7
3rd place, bronze medalist(s)	Michaela Hrubá	Czech Republic	1.87 m	5
4	Kristina Ovchinnikova	Kazakhstan	1.84 m	3
5	Nagisa Takahashi	Japan	1.84 m	
6	Inika McPherson	United States	1.84 m	
7	Saleta Fernández López	Spain	1.84 m	
8	Yelizaveta Matveyeva	Kazakhstan	1.84 m	
9	Svetlana Radzivil	Uzbekistan	1.78 m	
10	Aleksandra Sharkayeva	Uzbekistan	1.78 m	
11	Arina Malyugina	Kazakhstan	1.70 m	

Women's Long Jump
Place	Athlete	Country	Mark	Points
1st place, gold medalist(s)	Milica Gardašević	Serbia	6.45 m	10
2nd place, silver medalist(s)	Diana Lesti	Hungary	6.42 m	7
3rd place, bronze medalist(s)	Xiong Shiqi	China	6.38 m	5
4	Yue Ya Xin	Hong Kong	6.35 m	3
5	Alina Rotaru-Kottmann	Romania	6.28 m	
6	Petra Farkas	Hungary	6.25 m	
7	Tiffany Flynn	United States	6.05 m	
8	Anastassija Rypakowa	Kazakhstan	6.01 m	
9	Alina Tschistjakowa	Kazakhstan	5.82 m	
10	Irina Konitschschewa	Kazakhstan	5.79 m	
11	Ingeborg Grünwald	Austria	5.10 m	
	Jekaterina Awdejenko	Kazakhstan	NM	

=== Indoor Meeting ===
Men's 400m
Place	Athlete	Country	Time
1st place, gold medalist(s)	Iñaki Cañal	Spain	46.36
2nd place, silver medalist(s)	Ericsson Tavares	Portugal	46.95
3rd place, bronze medalist(s)	Vyacheslav Zems	Kazakhstan	48.05
4	Elnur Muchitdinow	Kazakhstan	48.53

Men's 60mH
Place	Athlete	Country	Time
1st place, gold medalist(s)	Junxi Liu	China	7.58
2nd place, silver medalist(s)	Milan Trajkovic	Cyprus	7.60
3rd place, bronze medalist(s)	Andrew Pozzi	Great Britain	7.63
4	David Yefremov	Kazakhstan	7.66
5	Max Hrelja	Sweden	7.70
6	Michael Dickson	United States	7.71
7	Chris Douglas	Australia	7.76
	Yaqoub Al-Youha	Kuwait	DNF

Men's 60mH Round 1
Place	Athlete	Country	Time	Heat
1	David Yefremov	Kazakhstan	7.59	2
2	Milan Trajkovic	Cyprus	7.60	1
3	Andrew Pozzi	Great Britain	7.64	2
4	Junxi Liu	China	7.68	1
5	Yaqoub Al-Youha	Kuwait	7.70	1
6	Chris Douglas	Australia	7.71	2
7	Michael Dickson	United States	7.71	2
8	Max Hrelja	Sweden	7.72	2
9	Roger Iribarne	Cuba	7.80	1
10	João Vítor de Oliveira	Portugal	7.83	1
11	Saeed Othman Alabsi	Qatar	7.89	2
12	Ergash Normuradov	Uzbekistan	7.92	2
13	Stefan Volzer	Germany	7.96	1
14	Sisínio Ambriz	Portugal	7.98	1
15	John Cabang	Philippines	7.99	2
16	Yevgeniy Prokudin	Kazakhstan	8.29	1

Women's 60m
Place	Athlete	Country	Time
1st place, gold medalist(s)	Anthonique Strachan	Bahamas	7.08
2nd place, silver medalist(s)	Magdalena Stefanowicz	Poland	7.10
3rd place, bronze medalist(s)	Farzaneh Fasihi	Iran	7.10
4	Salomé Kora	Switzerland	7.14
5	Tina Clayton	Jamaica	7.15
6	Alexandra Burghardt	Germany	7.15
7	Destiny Smith-Barnett	United States	7.17
8	Remona Burchell	Jamaica	7.23

Women's 60m Round 1
Place	Athlete	Country	Time	Heat
1	Salomé Kora	Switzerland	7.25	1
2	Magdalena Stefanowicz	Poland	7.25	1
3	Farzaneh Fasihi	Iran	7.25	1
4	Anthonique Strachan	Bahamas	7.25	2
5	Alexandra Burghardt	Germany	7.25	2
6	Tina Clayton	Jamaica	7.26	2
7	Destiny Smith-Barnett	United States	7.28	2
8	Remona Burchell	Jamaica	7.33	2
9	Christania Williams	Jamaica	7.34	1
10	Boglárka Takács	Hungary	7.35	2
11	Mallory Leconte	France	7.36	2
12	Mei Kodama	Japan	7.37	1
13	Olga Safronova	Kazakhstan	7.38	2
14	Natasha Morrison	Jamaica	7.40	1
15	Magdalena Lindner	Austria	7.40	1
