= Astana Indoor Meeting =

Annual indoor track and field competition

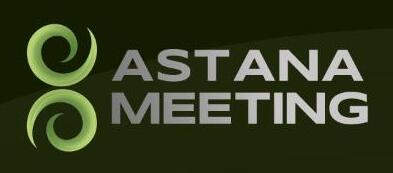
- Logo for the Astana Indoor Meeting in 2023
- Date: January
- Location: Qazaqstan Indoor Track and Field Arena; Astana, Kazakhstan
- Event type: Indoor athletics
- Established: 2023
- Website: Official website
- 2026 Astana Indoor Meeting

Astana Indoor Meeting is an annual indoor track and field competition which takes place in late January at the Qazaqstan Indoor Track and Field Arena in Astana, Kazakhstan. The meeting is currently an World Athletics Indoor Tour Gold Level Meeting for 2024.

The meeting was established in 2023, when it was a World Athletics Indoor Tour Silver Level meeting. The inaugural edition featured sprinter Michael Rodgers and World Athletics Indoor Championships 1500 m medalist Hirut Meshesha.

The 2024 edition of the meeting occurred on 27 January, becoming the first 2024 World Athletics Indoor Tour Gold level meeting.

The 2025 meeting scheduled for 25 January 2025 will be the first 2025 World Athletics Indoor Tour Gold level meeting.

== Editions ==
Astana Indoor Meeting editions
Ed.	Name	Date	Ref.
1st	2023 Astana Indoor Meeting	23 Jan 2023	
2nd	2024 Astana Indoor Meeting	27 Jan 2024	
3rd	2025 Astana Indoor Meeting	25 Jan 2025	

== Meeting records ==
=== Men ===
Men's meeting records of the Astana Indoor Meeting
Event	Record	Athlete	Nationality	Date	Meet	Ref.
60 m	6.55	Demek Kemp	United States	27 January 2024	2024	
400 m	46.36	Iñaki Cañal	Spain	27 January 2024	2024	
800 m	1:48.23	Marino Bloudek	Croatia	23 January 2023	2023	
1500 m	3:39.03	Kristian Uldbjerg Hansen	Denmark	25 January 2025	2025	
3000 m	7:33.80	Samuel Tefera	Ethiopia	27 January 2024	2024	
60 m hurdles	7.58	Liu Junxi	China	27 January 2024	2024	
60 m hurdles	7.58	Dylan Beard	United States	25 January 2025	2025	
High jump	2.15 m	Luis Castro Rivera	Puerto Rico	25 January 2025	2025	
Pole vault	5.80 m	Armand Duplantis	Sweden	27 January 2024	2024	
Long jump	7.91 m	Lester Lescay	Cuba	25 January 2025	2025	
Shot put	20.81 m	Scott Lincoln	Great Britain	27 January 2024	2024	

=== Women ===
Women's meeting records of the Astana Indoor Meeting
Event	Record	Athlete	Nationality	Date	Meet	Ref.
60 m	7.18	Arialis Josefa Gandulla	Portugal	23 January 2023	2023	
60 m	7.18	Tia Clayton	Jamaica	25 January 2025	2025	
400 m	52.64	Cátia Azevedo	Portugal	27 January 2024	2024	
1500 m	4:14.26	Jarinter Mawia Mwasya	Kenya	23 January 2023	2023	
Mile	4:23.76	Diribe Welteji	Ethiopia	27 January 2024	2024	
3000 m	8:39.80	Marta Alemayo	Ethiopia	25 January 2025	2025	
60 m hurdles	7.77	Tobi Amusan	Nigeria	27 January 2024	2024	
High jump	1.93 m	Nadezhda Dubovitskaya	Kazakhstan	23 January 2023	2023	
Long jump	6.45 m	Milica Gardašević	Serbia	27 January 2024	2024	
Triple jump	14.05 m	Neja Filipič	Slovenia	25 January 2025	2025	
Shot put	19.13 m	Chase Jackson	United States	25 January 2025	2025	

== See also ==
- Sport in Kazakhstan
