= 2024 Copernicus Cup =

Indoor athletics meeting in Toruń, Poland

- Dates: 6 February 2024
- Host city: Toruń, Poland
- Venue: Arena Toruń
- Level: 2024 World Athletics Indoor Tour

The 2024 Copernicus Cup was the 10th edition of the annual indoor track and field meeting in Toruń, Poland. Held on 6 February, it was the fourth leg of the 2024 World Athletics Indoor Tour Gold series – the highest-level international indoor track and field circuit.

The meeting was highlighted by the men's 3000 metres world record attempt by Selemon Barega, which came up two seconds short. In the women's 1500 m, Freweyni Hailu won over world road mile champion Diribe Welteji.

== Results ==
=== World Athletics Indoor Tour ===
Men's 60m
Place	Athlete	Country	Time	Points
1st place, gold medalist(s)	Jeremiah Azu	Great Britain	6.57	10
2nd place, silver medalist(s)	Oliwer Wdowik	Poland	6.60	7
3rd place, bronze medalist(s)	Akihiro Higashida	Japan	6.61	5
4	Richard Kilty	Great Britain	6.61	3
5	Kevin Kranz	Germany	6.63	
6	Simon Hansen	Denmark	6.67	
7	Ján Volko	Slovakia	6.71	
8	Adrian Brzeziński	Poland	6.72	

Men's 60m Round 1
Place	Athlete	Country	Time	Heat
1	Jeremiah Azu	Great Britain	6.58	2
2	Akihiro Higashida	Japan	6.62	1
3	Oliwer Wdowik	Poland	6.62	2
4	Kevin Kranz	Germany	6.63	2
5	Richard Kilty	Great Britain	6.65	2
6	Dominik Kopeć	Poland	6.66	1
7	Adrian Brzeziński	Poland	6.69	2
8	Ján Volko	Slovakia	6.70	2
9	Simon Hansen	Denmark	6.74	1
10	Jakub Lempach	Poland	6.75	1
11	Marek Zakrzewski	Poland	6.78	1
12	Joris van Gool	Netherlands	6.88	1

Men's 3000m
Place	Athlete	Country	Time	Points
1st place, gold medalist(s)	Selemon Barega	Ethiopia	7:25.82	10
2nd place, silver medalist(s)	Getnet Wale	Ethiopia	7:26.73	7
3rd place, bronze medalist(s)	Darragh McElhinney	Ireland	7:54.02	5
4	Adisu Girma	Ethiopia	8:03.35	3
5	Aleksander Wiącek	Poland	8:04.15	
6	Mohammadreza Abootorabi	Sweden	8:05.84	
	Filip Sasínek	Czech Republic	DNF	
	Jakub Szkudlarek	Poland	DNF	

Women's 400m
Place	Athlete	Country	Time	Heat	Points
1st place, gold medalist(s)	Lieke Klaver	Netherlands	50.57	1	10
2nd place, silver medalist(s)	Henriette Jæger	Norway	51.05	1	7
3rd place, bronze medalist(s)	Laviai Nielsen	Great Britain	51.31	1	5
4	Lada Vondrová	Czech Republic	51.80	1	3
5	Marika Popowicz-Drapała	Poland	52.14	2	
6	Justyna Święty-Ersetic	Poland	52.89	2	
7	Tereza Petržilková	Czech Republic	53.16	2	
8	Kinga Gacka	Poland	53.25	2	
9	Kornelia Lesiewicz	Poland	54.34	2	

Women's 1500m
Place	Athlete	Country	Time	Points
1st place, gold medalist(s)	Freweyni Hailu	Ethiopia	3:55.28	10
2nd place, silver medalist(s)	Diribe Welteji	Ethiopia	3:55.47	7
3rd place, bronze medalist(s)	Hirut Meshesha	Ethiopia	3:56.47	5
4	Tigist Girma	Ethiopia	3:58.79	3
5	Beatrice Chepkoech	Kenya	4:01.17	
6	Halimah Nakaayi	Uganda	4:02.78	
7	Weronika Lizakowska	Poland	4:05.16	
8	Sarah McDonald	Great Britain	4:05.32	
9	Martyna Galant	Poland	4:05.67	
10	Aleksandra Płocińska	Poland	4:09.51	
11	Eliza Megger	Poland	4:13.40	
12	Gela Hambese	Ethiopia	4:17.46	
	Nele Weßel	Germany	DNF	

Women's 60mH Round 1
Place	Athlete	Country	Time	Heat
1	Pia Skrzyszowska	Poland	7.84	1
2	Nadine Visser	Netherlands	7.89	2
3	Sarah Lavin	Ireland	7.98	1
4	Weronika Nagięć	Poland	8.08	2
5	Marika Majewska	Poland	8.09	2
6	Natalia Christofi	Cyprus	8.15	2
7	Luca Kozák	Hungary	8.22	1
8	Klaudia Siciarz	Poland	8.25	1
9	Natalia Szczęsna	Poland	8.26	1
10	Karolina Kołeczek	Poland	8.26	2
11	Klaudia Wojtunik	Poland	8.29	1
12	Alicja Sielska	Poland	8.35	2
	Reetta Hurske	Finland	DNF	2

=== Indoor Meeting ===
Men's 1500m
Place	Athlete	Country	Time
1st place, gold medalist(s)	Samuel Tefera	Ethiopia	3:34.61
2nd place, silver medalist(s)	Biniam Mehary	Ethiopia	3:34.83
3rd place, bronze medalist(s)	Tshepo Tshite	South Africa	3:35.06
4	Adel Mechaal	Spain	3:35.53
5	Ossama Meslek	Italy	3:35.63
6	Ruben Verheyden	Belgium	3:36.55
7	Robin van Riel	Netherlands	3:36.88
8	Filip Rak	Poland	3:37.30
9	Teddese Lemi	Ethiopia	3:38.68
10	Maciej Wyderka	Poland	3:39.31
11	Andrzej Kowalczyk	Poland	3:43.99
12	Michał Groberski	Poland	3:45.57
	Adam Czerwiński	Poland	DNF

Women's 800m
Place	Athlete	Country	Time
1st place, gold medalist(s)	Habitam Alemu	Ethiopia	1:57.86
2nd place, silver medalist(s)	Worknesh Mesele	Ethiopia	1:59.93
3rd place, bronze medalist(s)	Noélie Yarigo	Benin	2:00.23
4	Lore Hoffmann	Switzerland	2:00.41
5	Eveliina Määttänen	Finland	2:01.57
6	Anna Wielgosz	Poland	2:01.89
7	Angelika Sarna	Poland	2:02.46
8	Margarita Koczanowa	Poland	2:03.70
	Aneta Lemiesz	Poland	DNF
