= Indoor Meeting Karlsruhe =

Annual indoor track and field competition in Germany

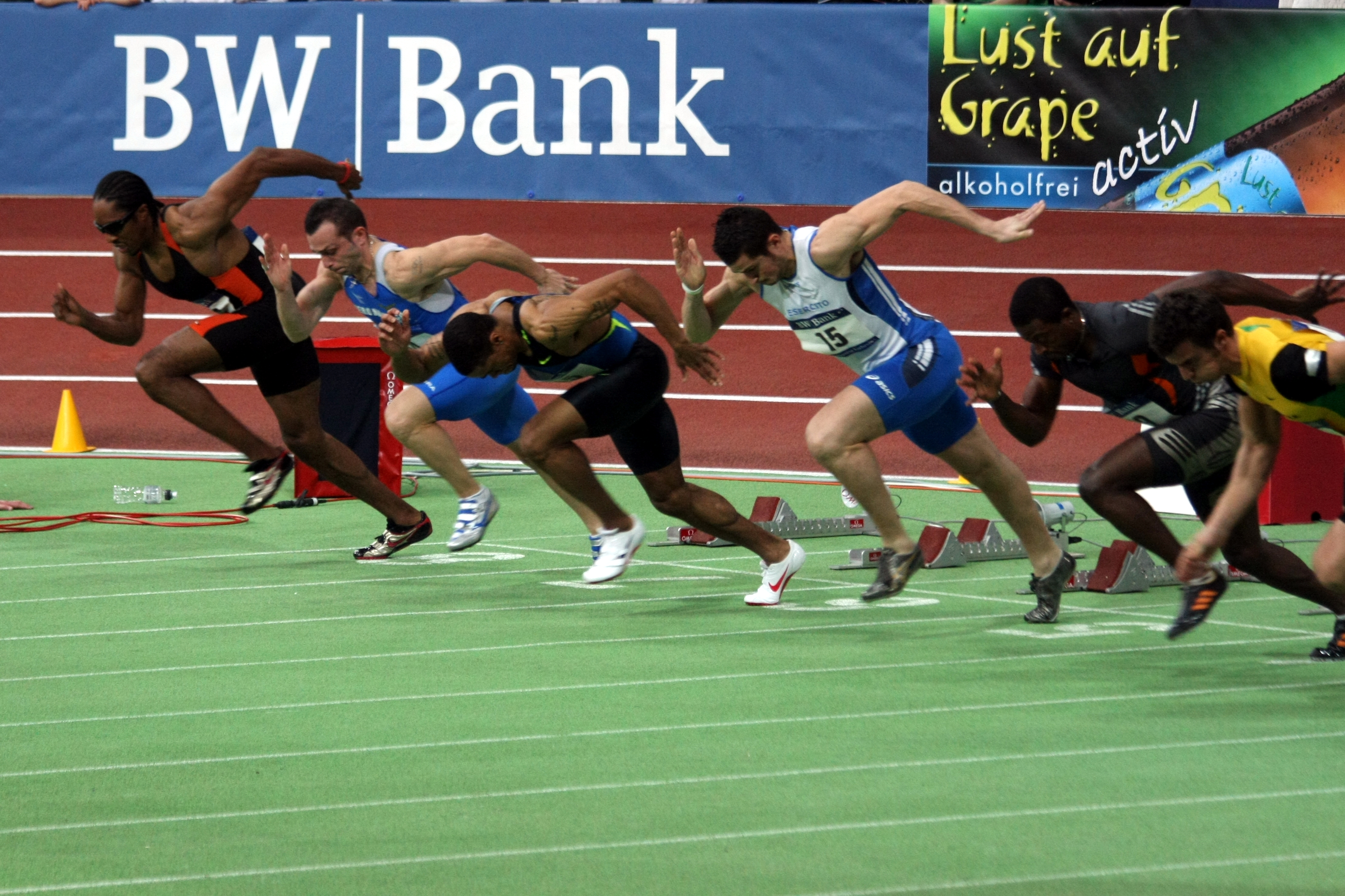
- The 60 metres at the 2009 Indoor Meeting Karlsruhe
- Date: February
- Location: Europahalle, Karlsruhe, Germany
- Event type: Indoor track and field
- Established: 1985
- Website: Indoor Meeting Karlsruhe
- 2026 Indoor Meeting Karlsruhe

Indoor Meeting Karlsruhe, formerly known as BW-Bank Meeting and officially known as the Init Indoor Meeting Karlsruhe, is an annual indoor track and field competition which takes place in January or February in Karlsruhe, Germany. The meeting was first held at the Europahalle in 1985 and is currently a World Athletics Indoor Tour Gold-level event, the highest level of one-day indoor meeting in the World Athletics calendar. The athletics meeting is known for having strong fields in the short sprint events. The 2016 edition was part of the inaugural IAAF World Indoor Tour.

The meeting has a strong tradition in the 60 metres hurdles event – Susanna Kallur set a women's world record in 2008, while Liu Xiang and Márcio de Souza have set continental records on the men's side.

It was previously known as the LBBW Meeting, changing to BW-Bank Meeting in 2006.

A strict limit of 199 occupants following safety concerns after modified fire safety regulations in Germany required in 2015 that the meeting was moved to Dm-Arena in Rheinstetten on Karlsruhe's exhibition areal. The sport infrastructure is temporary, it was first used in the 2013 European Athletics Indoor Championships in Gothenburg and was acquired by the city of Karlsruhe with the intention to be able to host various more high-profile athletics events in Dm-Arena than would be possible in Europahalle even if it is put back in normal operation.

== Editions ==
Indoor Meeting Karlsruhe editions
| Ed. | Name | Date | Ref. |
|---|---|---|---|
| 1st | 1985 Internationale Hallenleichtathletik Meeting | 3 Feb 1985 | |
| 2nd | 1986 Internationale Hallenleichtathletik Meeting | 31 Jan 1986 | |
| 3rd | 1987 Internationale Hallenleichtathletik Meeting | 28 Jan 1987 | |
| 4th | 1988 Internationale Hallenleichtathletik Meeting | 7 Feb 1988 | |
| 5th | 1989 Internationale Hallenleichtathletik Meeting | 24 Feb 1989 | |
| 6th | 1990 Internationale Hallenleichtathletik Meeting | 11 Feb 1990 | |
| 7th | 1991 Internationale Hallenleichtathletik Meeting | 24 Feb 1991 | |
| 8th | 1992 Internationale Hallenleichtathletik Meeting | 31 Jan 1992 | |
| 9th | 1993 Internationale Hallenleichtathletik Meeting | 6 Mar 1993 | |
| 10th | 1994 Internationale Hallenleichtathletik Meeting | 1 Mar 1994 | |
| 11th | 1995 Internationale Hallenleichtathletik Meeting | 12 Feb 1995 | |
| 12th | 1996 Internationale Hallenleichtathletik Meeting | 11 Feb 1996 | |
| 13th | 1997 Internationale Hallenleichtathletik Meeting | 14 Feb 1997 | |
| 14th | 1998 Internationale Hallenleichtathletik Meeting | 25 Jan 1998 | |
| 15th | 1999 Internationale Hallenleichtathletik Meeting | 24 Jan 1999 | |
| 16th | 2000 Internationale Hallenleichtathletik Meeting | 29 Jan 2000 | |
| 17th | 2001 LBBW Meeting | 27 Jan 2001 | |
| 18th | 2002 LBBW Meeting | 25 Jan 2002 | |
| 19th | 2003 LBBW Meeting | 28 Feb 2003 | |
| 20th | 2004 LBBW Meeting | 15 Feb 2004 | |
| 21st | 2005 LBBW Meeting | 13 Feb 2005 | |
| 22nd | 2006 BW-Bank Meeting | 29 Jan 2006 | |
| 23rd | 2007 BW-Bank Meeting | 11 Feb 2007 | |
| 24th | 2008 BW-Bank Meeting | 10 Feb 2008 | |
| 25th | 2009 BW-Bank Meeting | 15 Feb 2009 | |
| 26th | 2010 BW-Bank Meeting | 31 Jan 2010 | |
| 27th | 2011 BW-Bank Meeting | 13 Feb 2011 | |
| 28th | 2012 Internationale Hallenleichtathletik Meeting | 12 Feb 2012 | |
| 29th | 2013 Indoor Meeting Karlsruhe | 2 Feb 2013 | |
| 30th | 2014 Indoor Meeting Karlsruhe | 1 Feb 2014 | |
| 31st | 2015 Indoor Meeting Karlsruhe | 2 Feb 2015 | |
| 32nd | 2016 Indoor Meeting Karlsruhe | 6 Feb 2016 | |
| 33rd | 2017 Indoor Meeting Karlsruhe | 4 Feb 2017 | |
| 34th | 2018 Indoor Meeting Karlsruhe | 3 Feb 2018 | |
| 35th | 2019 Indoor Meeting Karlsruhe | 2 Feb 2019 | |
| 36th | 2020 Indoor Meeting Karlsruhe | 31 Jan 2020 | |
| 37th | 2021 Indoor Meeting Karlsruhe | 29 Jan 2021 | |
| 38th | 2022 Indoor Meeting Karlsruhe | 28 Jan 2022 | |
| 39th | 2023 Indoor Meeting Karlsruhe | 27 Jan 2023 | |
2024: Meet cancelled, Europahalle unavailable
| 40th | 2025 Indoor Meeting Karlsruhe | 7 Feb 2025 | |
| 41st | 2026 Indoor Meeting Karlsruhe | 8 Feb 2026 | |

== World records ==
Over the course of its history, three world records have been set at the Indoor Meeting Karlsruhe.

World records set at the Indoor Meeting Karlsruhe
| Year | Event | Record | Athlete | Nationality |
|---|---|---|---|---|
| 1998 | 3000 m | 7:26.15 | Haile Gebrselassie | Ethiopia |
| 2008 | 60 m hurdles | 7.68 | Susanna Kallur | Sweden |
| 2014 | 1500 m | 3:55.17 | Genzebe Dibaba | Ethiopia |

== Meeting records ==
=== Men ===
Men's meeting records of the Indoor Meeting Karlsruhe
| Event | Record | Athlete | Nationality | Date | Ref. |
|---|---|---|---|---|---|
| 60 m | 6.45 | Ronald Pognon | France | 13 February 2005 | |
| 200 m | 20.61 | Tobias Unger | Germany | 13 February 2005 | |
| 300 m | 32.19 | Robson Caetano da Silva | Brazil | 24 February 1989 | |
| 400 m | 46.03 | Brian Faust | United States | 7 February 2025 | |
| 800 m | 1:44.15 | Yuriy Borzakovskiy | Russia | 27 January 2001 | |
| 1000 m | 2:17.01 | Mehdi Baala | France | 13 February 2005 | |
| 1500 m | 3:33.08 | Daniel Kipchirchir Komen | Kenya | 13 February 2005 | |
| Mile | 3:53.74 | Jens-Peter Herold | Germany | 1 March 1994 | |
| 2000 m | 4:56.23 | Jens-Peter Herold | Germany | 6 March 1993 | |
| 3000 m | 7:26.15 | Haile Gebrselassie | Ethiopia | 25 January 1998 | |
| 60 m hurdles | 7.38 | Allen Johnson | United States | 22 February 1995 | |
| High jump | 2.35 m | Naoto Tobe | Japan | 2 February 2019 | |
| Pole vault | 6.02 m | Armand Duplantis | Sweden | 28 January 2022 | |
| Long jump | 8.38 m | Larry Myricks | United States | 7 February 1998 | |
| Triple jump | 17.46 m | Jadel Gregorio | Brazil | 15 February 2004 | |
| Shot put | 21.33 m | David Storl | Germany | 1 February 2014 | |

=== Women ===
Women's meeting records of the Indoor Meeting Karlsruhe
| Event | Record | Athlete | Nationality | Date | Ref. | Video |
|---|---|---|---|---|---|---|
| 60 m | 7.04 | Irina Privalova | Russia | 11 February 1996 | | |
| 60 m | 7.04 | Dina Asher-Smith | Great Britain | 27 January 2023 | | |
| 200 m | 22.50 | Irina Privalova | Russia | 31 January 1992 | | |
| 400 m | 50.84 | Helga Arendt | Germany | 7 February 1998 | | |
| 800 m | 1:57.48 | Maria Lurdes Mutola | Mozambique | 15 February 2004 | | |
| 1500 m | 3:55.17 | Genzebe Dibaba | Ethiopia | 1 February 2014 | | |
| 3000 m | 8:26.41 | Laura Muir | Great Britain | 4 February 2017 | | |
| 60 m hurdles | 7.68 | Susanna Kallur | Sweden | 10 February 2008 | | |
| High jump | 2.05 m | Ariane Friedrich | Germany | 15 February 2009 | | |
| Pole vault | 4.76 m | Silke Spiegelburg | Germany | 13 February 2011 | | |
| Long jump | 7.07 m | Malaika Mihambo | Germany | 7 February 2025 | | |
| Triple jump | 14.88 m | Yamile Aldama | Cuba | 29 January 2003 | | |
| Shot put | 20.68 m | Sarah Mitton | Canada | 7 February 2025 | | |
