= Malachi Murray =

Canadian sprinter

Personal information
- Born: March 18, 2000 (age 26) Edmonton, Alberta, Canada
- Education: St. Francis Xavier Catholic High School

Sport
- Sport: Track and field
- Event: 100 m
- Club: Capital City Track Club

Achievements and titles
- Personal bests: 100 m: 10.01 (Baton Rouge 2024); 200 m: 20.91 (Baton Rouge 2022); Indoor; 50 m: 5.77 (Saskatoon 2024); 60 m: 6.55 (Edmonton 2024)

Malachi Murray (born 18 March 2000) is a Canadian sprinter who specializes in the 100 m. He represented Canada in the 100 m at the 2022 Commonwealth Games and was named as an alternate for Canada's 4 × 100 m relay team at the 2022 and 2023 World Athletics Championships. He holds a personal best of 10.01, set in April 2024.

== Athletics career ==
=== 2019 ===
In 2019, Murray represented Canada at the Pan American U20 Championships in San Jose, Costa Rica. Competing in the 100 m, he was eliminated in the heats, still managing a personal best of 10.49. He also competed as part of Canada 4 × 100 m relay, placing sixth.

=== 2021 ===
In 2021, Murray earned a last-minute invitation to the Canadian Olympic Trials in Montreal after running a 10.30 personal best in Guelph, Ontario. He would go on to place sixth in 10.64.

=== 2022 ===
Competing at the 2022 Canadian Track and Field Championships, Murray ran a personal best of 10.19 in the heats and placed fifth in the final. This performance earned him selection as an alternate for Canada's 4 × 100 metres relay for the 2022 World Athletics Championships in Eugene, Oregon.

He also competed at the 2022 Commonwealth Games in Birmingham. He would go on to place fourth in his heat, not advancing to the final.

=== 2023 ===
In April 2023, Murray ran a personal best of 10.16 at the LSU Alumni Gold Meet in Baton Rouge, Louisiana. He followed that up with another personal best in the heats of the 2023 Canadian Track and Field Championships in July, running 10.14 and placing sixth in the final. He was again selected as a 4 × 100 metres relay alternate for the 2023 World Athletics Championships where he did not compete.

=== 2024 ===
After a breakthrough 60 m performance of 6.55 to hit the world indoor qualifying standard, he was selected to represented Canada at the 2024 World Athletics Indoor Championships in Glasgow, Scotland. He advanced to the semi-finals, but was unable to qualify for the finals.

In his second race of the 2024 outdoor season, Murray ran faster than his previous personal best of 10.14, running 10.14 at the LSU Alumni Gold Meet, however the wind reading (+3.4) was above the legal limit. The following week, on April 27, he ran a wind-legal personal best of 10.01 at the LSU Invitational, tying him with Gavin Smellie for the eighth fastest performance in Canadian history.

== Competition record ==
Representing Canada
Year	Competition	Venue	Position	Event	Time
2019	Pan American U20 Championships	San José, Costa Rica	9th	100 m	10.49
2022	Commonwealth Games	Birmingham, United Kingdom	34th	100 m	10.47
2024	World Indoor Championships	Glasgow, United Kingdom	23rd	60 m	6.73
