= ISTAF Indoor =

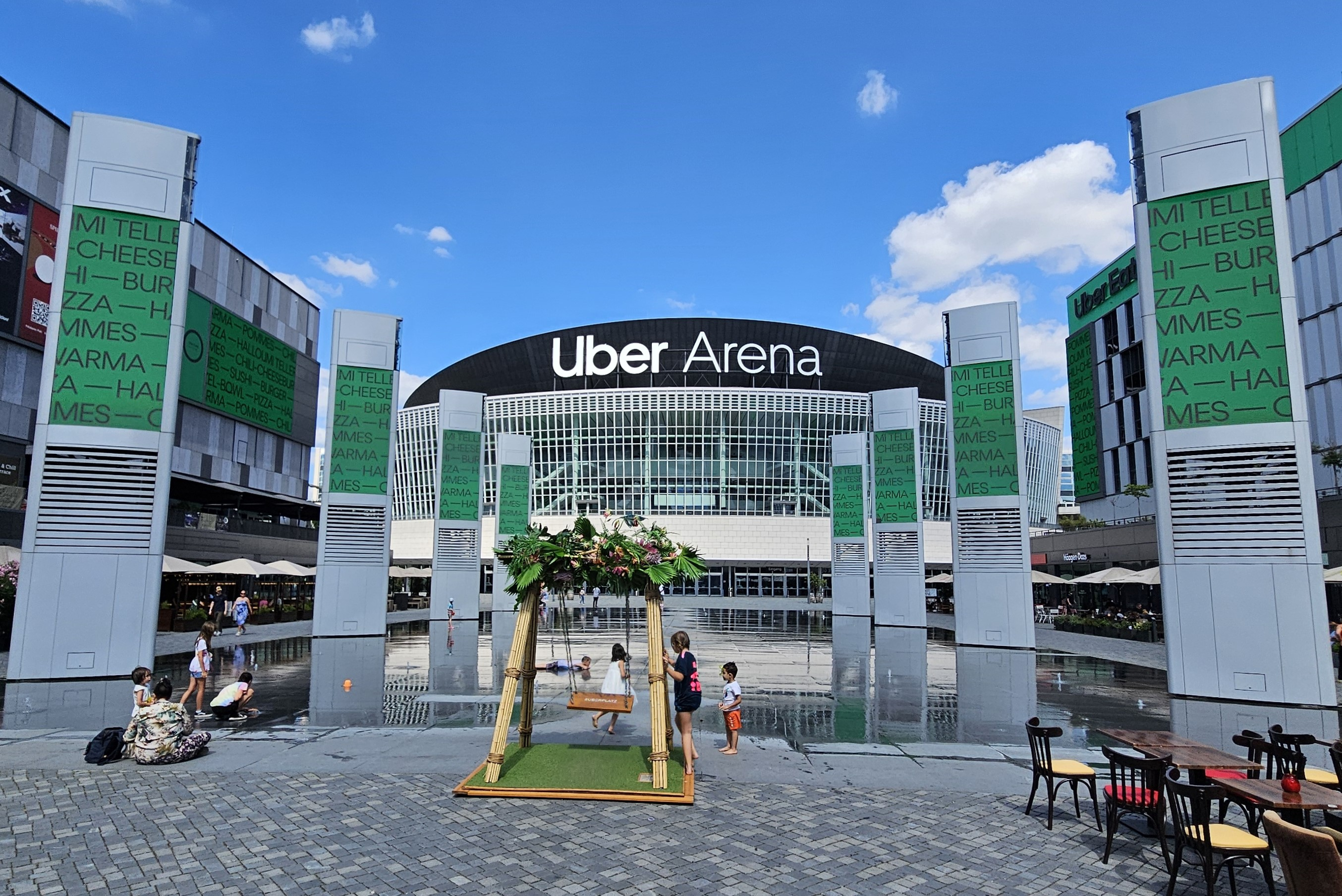
- The Uber Arena hosts the meet
- Date: February–March
- Location: (Germany) Berlin
- Event type: Indoor track and field
- World Athletics Cat.: World Athletics Indoor Tour – Silver
- Established: 2014
- Website: ISTAF Indoor

Meeting Logo

The ISTAF Indoor is an indoor track and field meeting which takes place at the Uber Arena in Berlin, Germany. The inaugural edition took place on March 1, 2014. Since 2021 the ISS Dome in Düsseldorf hosts a second event under the name ISTAF Indoor Düsseldorf.

== Meeting records ==
=== Men ===
Men's meeting records of the ISTAF Indoor
Event	Record	Athlete	Nationality	Date	Ref.
60 m	6.47	Jeremiah Azu	Great Britain	6 March 2026	
60 m hurdles	7.37	Jakub Szymański	Poland	6 March 2026	
Pole vault	6.10 m	Armand Duplantis	Sweden	14 February 2025	
Shot put	21.20 m	David Storl	Germany	1 March 2014	
Discus throw	65.72 m	Kristjan Čeh	Slovenia	23 February 2024	

=== Women ===
Women's meeting records of the ISTAF Indoor
Event	Record	Athlete	Nationality	Date	Ref.
60 m	7.00	Dafne Schippers	Netherlands	13 February 2016	
60 m hurdles	7.79	Sally Pearson	Australia	1 March 2014	
Long jump	7.07 m	Malaika Mihambo	Germany	14 February 2020	
Shot put	20.69 m	Jessica Schilder	Netherlands	6 March 2026	
Discus throw	65.23 m Mx	Shanice Craft	Germany	10 February 2023	
