= Akihiro Higashida =

Japanese sprinter

Personal information
- Born: 13 December 1995 (age 30)
- Height: 1.72 m (5 ft 8 in)

Sport
- Sport: Athletics
- Events: 100 metres; 200 metres

Achievements and titles
- Personal bests: 100m: 10.14 (2024); 200m: 20.60 (2021)

Akihiro Higashida (東田 旺洋, born 13 December 1995) is a Japanese sprinter. He competed in the men's 100 metres event at the 2024 Summer Olympics.
