= ISTAF Indoor Düsseldorf =

Indoor track and field athletics hall

ISTAF Indoor
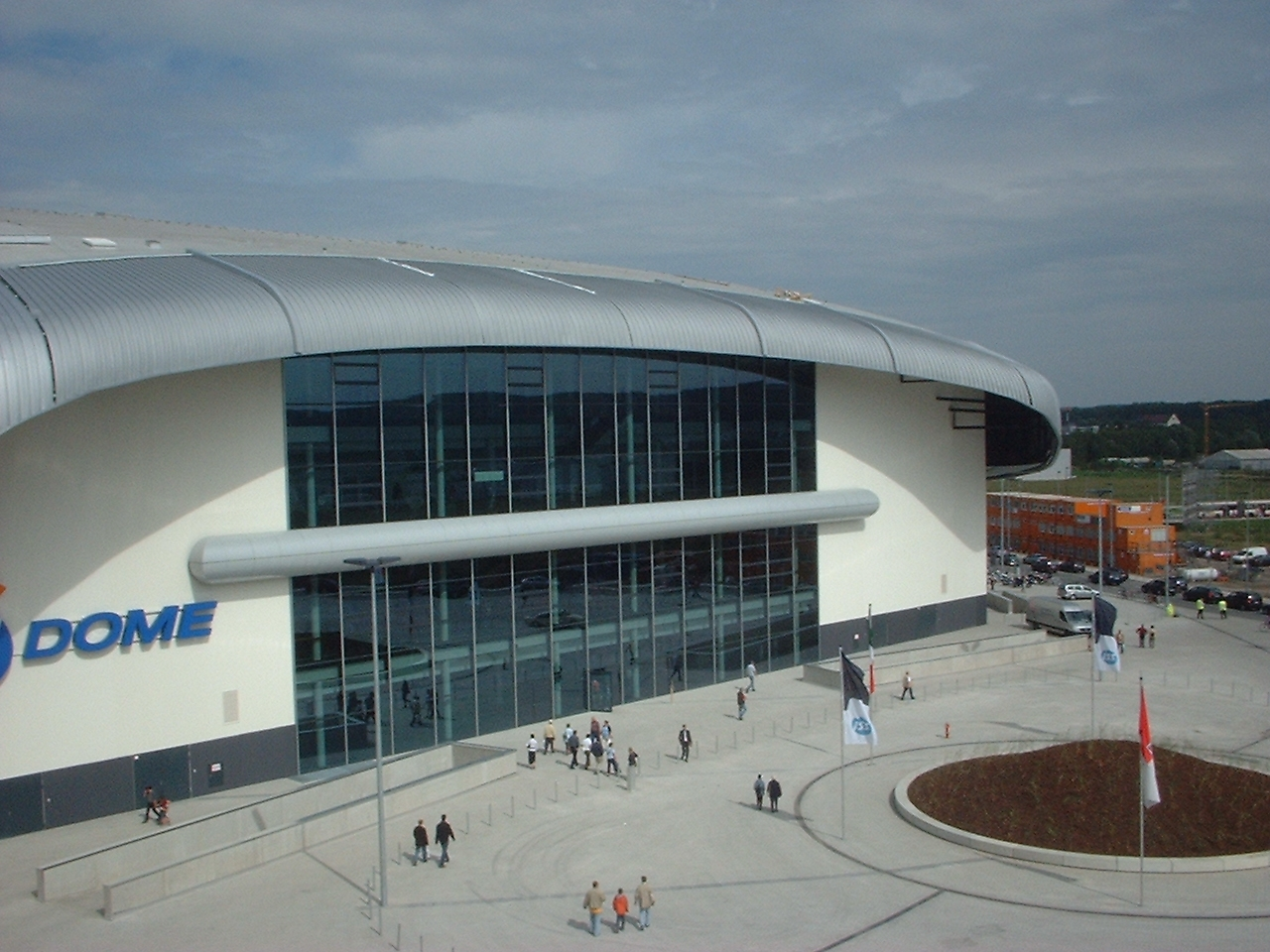
- The PSD Bank Dome hosts the meet
- Date: January
- Location: (Germany) Düsseldorf
- Event type: Indoor track and field
- Established: 2021
- Website: ISTAF Indoor Düsseldorf

Meeting Logo

The ISTAF Indoor Düsseldorf is an indoor track and field meeting which takes place at the PSD Bank Dome in Düsseldorf, Germany. The inaugural edition took place on January 31, 2021.

== Meeting records ==
=== Men ===
Men's meeting records of the ISTAF Indoor Düsseldorf
Event	Record	Athlete	Nationality	Date	Ref.
60 m	6.54	Arthur Cissé	Ivory Coast	31 January 2021	
60 m	6.54	Henrik Larsson	Sweden	9 February 2025	
60 m hurdles	7.47	Jakub Szymanski	Poland	4 February 2024	
Pole vault	6.01 m	Armand Duplantis	Sweden	31 January 2021	

=== Women ===
Women's meeting records of the ISTAF Indoor Düsseldorf
Event	Record	Athlete	Nationality	Date	Ref.
60 m	7.10	Ewa Swoboda	Poland	20 February 2022	
60 m hurdles	7.84	Pia Skrzyszowska	Poland	29 January 2023	
Long jump	6.96 m	Malaika Mihambo	Germany	20 February 2022	
Shot put	19.78 m	Yemisi Ogunleye	Germany	9 February 2025	
