= Dylan Beard =

American hurdler (born 1998)

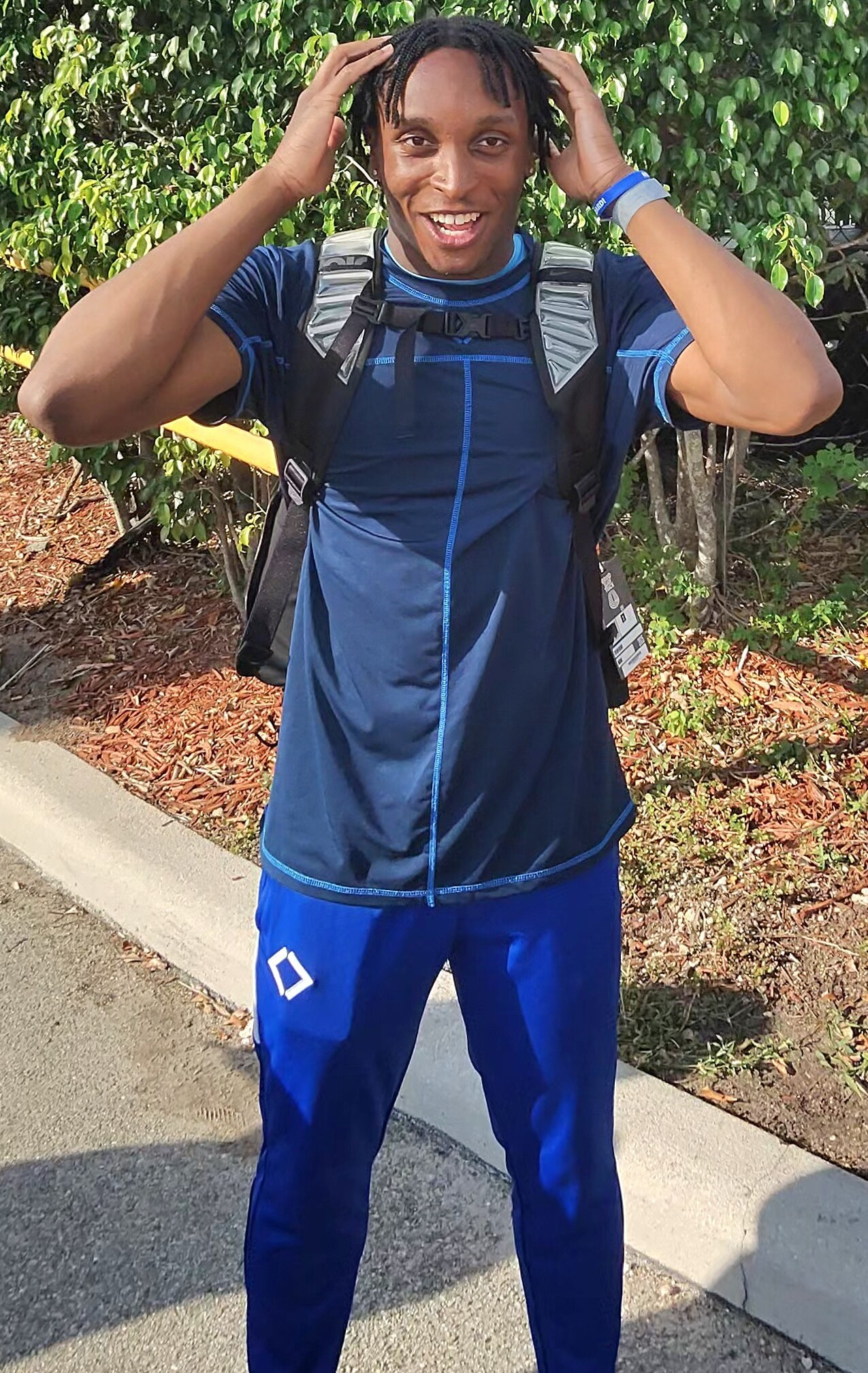

Personal information
- Nationality: United States
- Born: September 15, 1998 (age 27)
- Home town: Baltimore, Maryland, United States
- Education: Archbishop Spalding High School; Wagner College; Hampton University; Howard University
- Height: 183 cm (6 ft 0 in)
- Weight: 73 kg (161 lb)

Sport
- Sport: Sport of athletics
- Events: 60 metres hurdles 110 metres hurdles
- College team: Wagner Seahawks; Hampton Pirates; Howard Bison

Achievements and titles
- National finals: 2017 USA U20s; • 110m hurdles, 7th
- Personal bests: 60mH: 7.38 (2025); 110mH: 13.02 (+1.1) (2025)
Medal record
Men's athletics
Representing United States
NACAC Championships
Silver medal – second place	2025 Freeport	110 m hurdles
- Updated on May 6, 2024

Dylan Beard (born September 15, 1998) is an American hurdler specializing in the 110 metres hurdles. He was notable for winning the 2024 Millrose Games 60 m hurdles while being unsponsored and working as a Walmart deli employee.

== Career ==
Competing for Archbishop Spalding High School, in 2016 Beard set a Maryland Interscholastic Athletic Association championship record in the 55 metres hurdles, running 7.49 seconds. He placed 7th in the finals of the 2017 USATF U20 Outdoor Championships.

Beard competed for three different NCAA teams in college, transferring from the Wagner Seahawks to the Hampton Pirates and attending graduate school with the Howard Bison track and field team. Beard qualified for the 2019, 2022, and 2023 NCAA East preliminary rounds in the 110 m hurdles but did not advance to the NCAA Division I Men's Outdoor Track and Field Championships or the indoor NCAA championships during his collegiate career.

At the 2023 Tom Jones Memorial meet, Beard improved his 110 m hurdles personal best from 13.55 to 13.31 seconds. This qualified him for the 2023 USA Outdoor Track and Field Championships, where he advanced from the first round but placed 7th in his semifinal and did not make the finals. He was nonetheless selected for the 2023 U.S. Pan American Games team, where he ran 14.15 seconds to place 6th in the 110 m hurdles final.

Beard significantly improved his times in early 2024, going undefeated throughout the indoor season in the 60 metres hurdles up through the 2024 Millrose Games, running 7.44 seconds to pull an upset win over Daniel Roberts, Trey Cunningham, and Cordell Tinch. Despite his success at Millrose, Beard only ran 7.65 seconds at the 2024 USA Indoor Track and Field Championships and was the fastest athlete to not qualify for the finals.

At his last meet before the 2024 United States Olympic trials, Beard ran a personal best of 13.10 seconds in the 110 m hurdles, making him the 10th-fastest performer in the world that year. At the trials, Beard ran 13.19 seconds in his first round to advance to the semifinals, but his 13.38-second semifinal performance was not fast enough to advance to the finals and qualify for the 2024 U.S. Olympic team.

Beard placed third overall in the US Outdoor Track & Field Championships in 2025, behind Cordell Tinch and Ja'kobe Tharp. He ran with a time of 13.04.

== Personal life ==
Beard is from Baltimore, Maryland, where he played football and ran track at Archbishop Spalding High School. Beard's cousin is NFL football player Antoine Bethea.

In 2024, Beard was presented with a $20,000 check from his employer Walmart on The TODAY Show to support his attempt to qualify for the Olympics.

== Statistics ==
=== Circuit performances ===
Grand Slam Track results
Slam	Race group	Event	Pl.	Time	Prize money
2025 Kingston Slam	Short hurdles	110 m hurdles	1st	13.29	US$50,000
2025 Kingston Slam	Short hurdles	100 m	3rd	10.67	US$50,000
2025 Miami Slam	Short hurdles	110 m hurdles	5th	13.24	US$15,000
2025 Miami Slam	Short hurdles	100 m	5th	10.63	US$15,000

=== Personal best progression ===
110m Hurdles progression
#	Mark	Pl.	Competition	Venue	Date	Ref.
1	14.42 (+1.7 m/s)	1st place, gold medalist(s)	TCNJ Invitational, College of NJ	Ewing, NJ	April 7, 2017	
2	14.33 (+0.6 m/s)	(gold) (Round B)	IC4A Outdoor Track & Field Championships, Princeton	Princeton, NJ	May 11, 2017	
3	14.27 (+1.3 m/s)	(silver) (Round C)	2019 Colonial Relays	Williamsburg, VA	April 5, 2019	
4	14.12 (±0.0 m/s)	4th (Heat 1)	Penn Relays, Franklin Field	Philadelphia, PA	April 25, 2019	
5	14.03 (+1.0 m/s)	5th (Heat 4)	NCAA East Preliminary Round	Jacksonville, FL	May 23, 2019	
6	13.85 (±0.0 m/s)	(gold) (Heat 2)	Morgan State Legacy Track & Field Meet	Baltimore, MD	April 22, 2022	
7	13.55 (+0.6 m/s)	1st place, gold medalist(s)	Morgan State Legacy Track & Field Meet	Baltimore, MD	April 22, 2022	
8	13.31 (+2.0 m/s)	2nd place, silver medalist(s)	UF Tom Jones Memorial	Gainesville, FL	April 14, 2023	
9	13.25 (+0.8 m/s)	1st place, gold medalist(s)	Aggie Invitational	Greensboro, NC	May 3, 2024	
10	13.10 (+0.7 m/s)	1st place, gold medalist(s)	Last Chance Qualifier @ Mceachern High School	Marietta, GA	June 7, 2024	
