= 2018 European Athletics Championships – Women's 3000 metres steeplechase =

Women's 3000 metres steeplechase at the 2018 European Athletics Championships
- Venue: Olympic Stadium
- Location: Berlin
- Dates: August 10 (round 1); August 12 (final)
- Competitors: 33 from 21 nations
- Winning time: 9:19.80

Medalists
gold medal	Gesa Felicitas Krause	Germany
silver medal	Fabienne Schlumpf	Switzerland
bronze medal	Karoline Bjerkeli Grøvdal	Norway

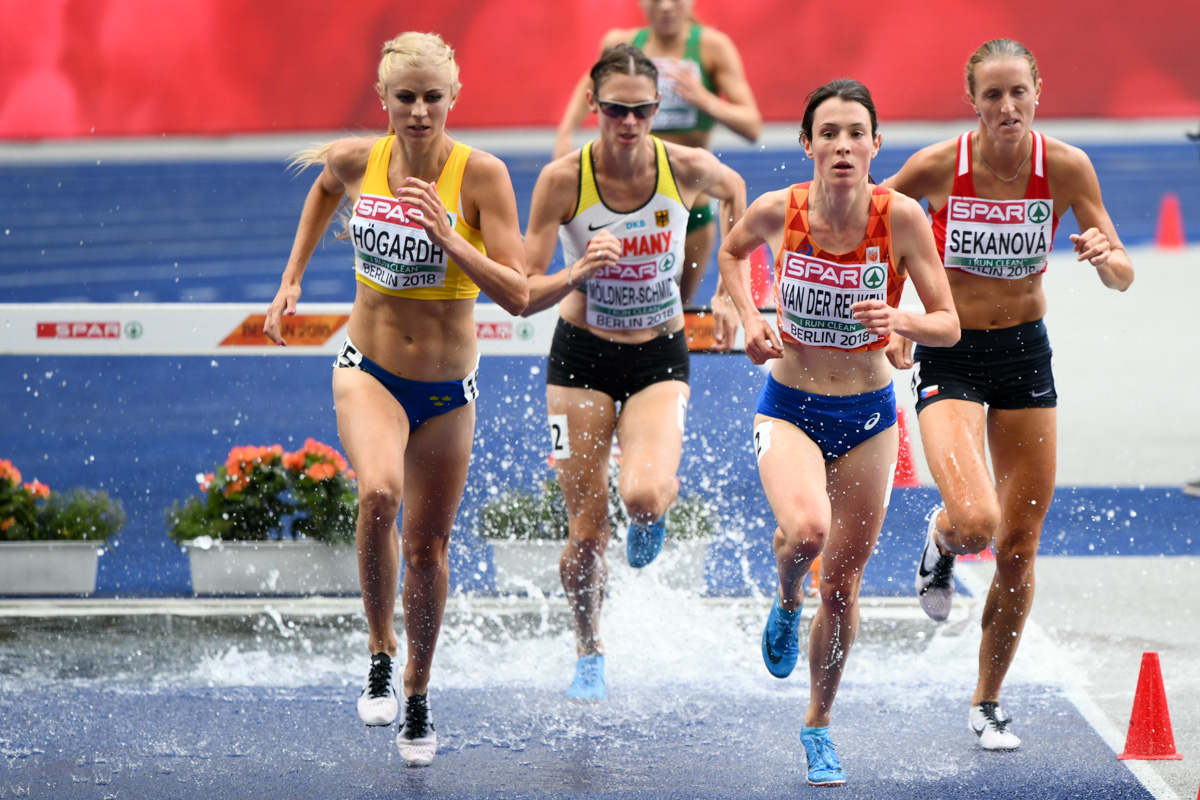
2018 European Athletics Championships Day 5 – Caroline Högardh, Antje Möldner-Schmidt, Irene van der Reijken, Lucie Sekanová

The women's 3000 metres steeplechase at the 2018 European Athletics Championships took place at the Olympic Stadium on 10 and 12 August.

== Records ==
Standing records prior to the 2018 European Athletics Championships
World record	Beatrice Chepkoech (KEN)	8:44.32	Monaco	20 July 2018
European record	Gulnara Samitova (RUS)	8:58.81	Beijing, PR China	17 August 2008
Championship record	Yuliya Zarudneva (RUS)	9:17.57	Barcelona, Spain	30 July 2010
World Leading	Beatrice Chepkoech (KEN)	8:44.32	Monaco	20 July 2018
European Leading	Yekaterina Ivonina (RUS)	9:16.68	Kazan, Russia	20 July 2018

== Schedule ==
Date	Time	Round
10 August 2018	12:25	Round 1
12 August 2018	20:55	Final

== Results ==
=== Round 1 ===
First 5 in each heat (Q) and the next fastest 5 (q) advance to the Semifinals.

Rank	Heat	Name	Nationality	Time	Note
1	2	Fabienne Schlumpf	Switzerland	9:32.32	Q, SB
2	2	Luiza Gega	Albania	9:33.11	Q
3	2	Gesa Felicitas Krause	Germany	9:33.51	Q, SB
4	2	Rosie Clarke	Great Britain	9:33.78	Q
5	2	Isabel Mattuzzi	Italy	9:34.02	Q, PB
6	1	Karoline Bjerkeli Grøvdal	Norway	9:34.23	Q
7	2	Maruša Mišmaš	Slovenia	9:34.28	q, NR
8	1	Anna Emilie Møller	Denmark	9:34.46	Q, SB
9	1	Ophélie Claude-Boxberger	France	9:34.50	Q
10	1	Elena Burkard	Germany	9:34.63	Q
11	1	Irene Sánchez-Escribano	Spain	9:34.69	Q, PB
12	2	Adva Cohen	Israel	9:36.13	q, NR
13	2	Emma Oudiou	France	9:36.15	q, PB
14	1	Nataliya Strebkova	Ukraine	9:37.28	q, PB
15	1	Viktória Gyürkés	Hungary	9:38.56	q
16	1	Martina Merlo	Italy	9:41.05	PB
17	1	Alicja Konieczek	Poland	9:41.16	PB
18	2	Jana Sussmann	Germany	9:41.18	
19	2	Janica Rauma	Finland	9:41.70	PB
20	2	María José Pérez	Spain	9:44.72	
21	1	Chiara Scherrer	Switzerland	9:47.46	
22	2	Francesca Bertoni	Italy	9:47.75	
23	1	Sviatlana Kudzelich	Belarus	9:47.89	SB
24	2	Matylda Kowal	Poland	9:49.27	
25	1	Lucie Sekanová	Czech Republic	9:50.38	SB
26	1	Özlem Kaya	Turkey	9:50.80	
27	1	Antje Möldner-Schmidt	Germany	9:52.79	
28	2	Zita Kácser	Hungary	9:53.36	SB
29	2	Katarzyna Kowalska	Poland	9:54.83	
30	1	Caroline Högardh	Sweden	9:55.61	
31	1	Irene van der Reijken	Netherlands	9:57.10	
32	1	Kerry O'Flaherty	Ireland	10:09.81	
33	2	Michele Finn	Ireland	10:10.93	

=== Final ===
Rank	Name	Nationality	Time	Note
1st place, gold medalist(s)	Gesa Felicitas Krause	Germany	9:19.80	SB
2nd place, silver medalist(s)	Fabienne Schlumpf	Switzerland	9:22.29	SB
3rd place, bronze medalist(s)	Karoline Bjerkeli Grøvdal	Norway	9:24.46	
4	Luiza Gega	Albania	9:24.78	
5	Adva Cohen	Israel	9:29.74	NR
6	Elena Burkard	Germany	9:29.76	PB
7	Anna Emilie Møller	Denmark	9:31.66	NR
8	Irene Sánchez-Escribano	Spain	9:31.84	PB
9	Ophélie Claude-Boxberger	France	9:31.84	PB
10	Rosie Clarke	Great Britain	9:32.15	
11	Maruša Mišmaš	Slovenia	9:34.50	
12	Nataliya Strebkova	Ukraine	9:40.03	
13	Viktória Gyürkés	Hungary	9:40.41	
14	Emma Oudio	France	9:43.26	
15	Isabel Mattuzzi	Italy	9:43.90	
