= 2016 European Athletics Championships – Women's 3000 metres steeplechase =

Event at the 2016 European Athletics Championships

Women's 3000 metres steeplechase at the European Athletics Championships
- Venue: Olympic Stadium
- Location: Amsterdam
- Winning time: 9:18.85 EL

Medalists
gold medal	Gesa-Felicitas Krause	Germany
silver medal	Luiza Gega	Albania
bronze medal	Özlem Kaya	Turkey

The women's 3000 metre steeplechase at the 2016 European Athletics Championships took place at the Olympic Stadium on 8 and 10 July.

== Records ==
Standing records prior to the 2016 European Athletics Championships
World record	Gulnara Samitova-Galkina (RUS)	8:58.81	Beijing, PR China	17 August 2008
European record	Gulnara Samitova-Galkina (RUS)	8:58.81	Beijing, PR China	17 August 2008
Championship record	Yuliya Zarudneva (RUS)	9:17.57	Barcelona, Spain	30 July 2010
World Leading	Ruth Jebet (BHR)	8:59:97	Eugene, United States	28 May 2016
European Leading	Gesa Felicitas Krause (GER)	9:22.33	Eugene, United States	28 May 2016

== Schedule ==
Date	Time	Round
8 July 2016	13:30	Round 1
10 July 2016	17:15	Final

All times are local times (UTC+2)

== Results ==
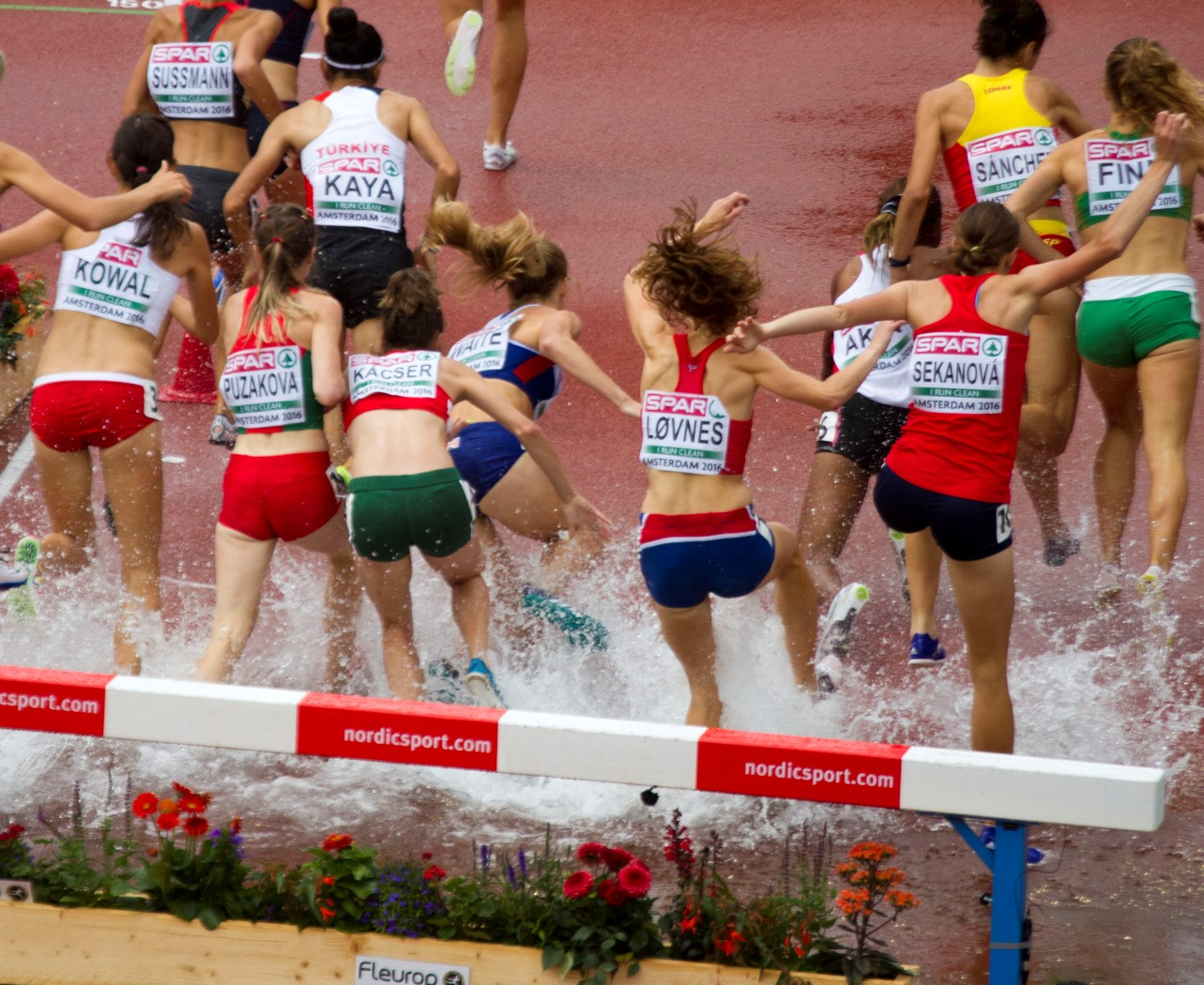
Heat 1

=== Round 1 ===
First 5 in each heat (Q) and 5 best performers (q) advance to the Final.

Rank	Heat	Name	Nationality	Time	Note
1	2	Luiza Gega	Albania	9:38.87	Q
2	2	Fabienne Schlumpf	Switzerland	9:40.28	Q, SB
3	2	Sandra Eriksson	Finland	9:41.16	Q
4	2	Mariya Shatalova	Ukraine	9:41.65	Q
5	2	Sara Louise Treacy	Ireland	9:42.16	Q, PB
6	1	Gesa-Felicitas Krause	Germany	9:43.81	Q
7	1	Özlem Kaya	Turkey	9:44.41	Q
8	2	Kerry O'Flaherty	Ireland	9:45.53	q
9	1	Meryem Akda	Turkey	9:45.69	Q
10	2	Diana Martín	Spain	9:45.90	q
11	1	Michele Finn	Ireland	9:45.93	Q, SB
12	1	Matylda Kowal	Poland	9:46.25	Q
13	1	Nastassia Puzakova	Belarus	9:46.36	q, PB
14	2	Maya Rehberg	Germany	9:47.32	q
15	1	Ingeborg Løvnes	Norway	9:47.50	q
16	1	Lennie Waite	Great Britain	9:48.46	
17	2	Ancuța Bobocel	Romania	9:48.91	
18	1	Jana Sussmann	Germany	9:49.04	
19	2	Maria Larsson	Sweden	9:50.16	PB
20	1	Camilla Richardsson	Finland	9:54.80	
21	1	Maeva Danois	France	9:58.73	
22	2	Viktória Gyürkés	Hungary	9:59.08	
23	2	Rosie Clarke	Great Britain	10:00.25	
24	1	Irene Sánchez-Escribano	Spain	10:08.12	
25	1	Lucie Sekanová	Czech Republic	10:10.93	
26	1	Zita Kácser	Hungary	10:19.74	
	2	Elif Karabulut	Turkey	DNF	
	2	Maruša Mišmaš	Slovenia	DNS	

=== Final ===
Rank	Name	Nationality	Time	Note
1st place, gold medalist(s)	Gesa-Felicitas Krause	Germany	9:18.85	EL
2nd place, silver medalist(s)	Luiza Gega	Albania	9:28.52	NR
3rd place, bronze medalist(s)	Özlem Kaya	Turkey	9:35.05	SB
4	Mariya Shatalova	Ukraine	9:38.17	SB
5	Fabienne Schlumpf	Switzerland	9:40.01	SB
6	Nastassia Puzakova	Belarus	9:42.91	PB
7	Michele Finn	Ireland	9:43.19	PB
8	Diana Martín	Spain	9:43.65	
9	Sara Louise Treacy	Ireland	9:45.19	
10	Sandra Eriksson	Finland	9:45.71	
11	Ingeborg Løvnes	Norway	9:45.75	
12	Kerry O'Flaherty	Ireland	9:45.88	
13	Meryem Akda	Turkey	9:55.42	
14	Matylda Kowal	Poland	9:57.27	
	Maya Rehberg	Germany	DQ	R169.7a
