= Athletics at the 2017 Summer Universiade – Women's 3000 metres steeplechase =

The women's 3000 metres steeplechase event at the 2017 Summer Universiade was held on 26 August at the Taipei Municipal Stadium.

== Results ==
Rank	Name	Nationality	Time	Notes
1st place, gold medalist(s)	Tuğba Güvenç	Turkey	9:51.27	
2nd place, silver medalist(s)	Viktória Gyürkés	Hungary	9:52.17	
3rd place, bronze medalist(s)	Özlem Kaya	Turkey	9:52.59	
4	Paige Campbell	Australia	10:00.15	PB
5	Francesca Bertoni	Italy	10:09.16	
6	Belén Casetta	Argentina	10:12.77	
7	Eva Krchová	Czech Republic	10:13.12	
8	Lucie Sekanová	Czech Republic	10:19.38	
9	Tatiane da Silva	Brazil	10:22.21	
10	Matylda Kowal	Poland	10:23.47	
11	Oksana Raita	Ukraine	10:26.53	
12	Veerle Bakker	Netherlands	10:29.65	
13	Stella Radford	Australia	10:36.36	
14	Michelle Finn	Ireland	10:40.06	
15	Selena Sierra	United States	11:10.98	
16	Thembi Baloyi	South Africa	11:19.24	
17	Annet Chebet	Uganda	11:36.64	SB

Official Video
