= 2011 European Athletics U23 Championships – Women's 3000 metres steeplechase =

The Women's 3000 metres steeplechase event at the 2011 European Athletics U23 Championships was held in Ostrava, Czech Republic, at Městský stadion on 14 and 16 July.

== Medalists ==
Gold	Gülcan Mıngır; Turkey
Silver	Jana Sussmann; Germany
Bronze	Mariya Shatalova; Ukraine

== Results ==
=== Final ===
16 July 2011 / 20:00

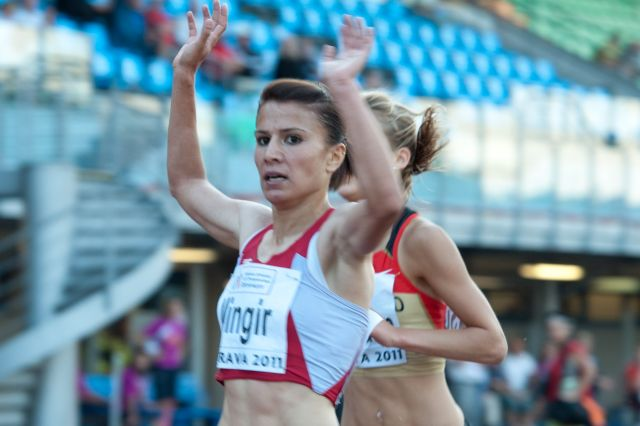
Gülcan Mıngır having won the gold

Rank	Name	Nationality	Time	Notes
1st place, gold medalist(s)	Gülcan Mıngır	Turkey	9:47.83	
2nd place, silver medalist(s)	Jana Sussmann	Germany	9:48.01	
3rd place, bronze medalist(s)	Mariya Shatalova	Ukraine	9:48.22	SB
4	Matylda Szlęzak	Poland	9:48.77	PB
5	Martina Tresch	Switzerland	9:51.96	NR
6	Eilish McColgan	United Kingdom	9:52.02	
7	Giulia Martinelli	Italy	9:53.12	
8	Eva Krchová	Czech Republic	9:54.71	PB
9	Poļina Jeļizarova	Latvia	9:56.88	
10	Lucie Sekanová	Czech Republic	10:07.61	
11	Özlem Kaya	Turkey	10:12.05	SB
	Karoline Bjerkeli Grøvdal	Norway	DNS	

Intermediate times:
1000m: 3:15.38 Giulia Martinelli Italy
2000m: 6:36.30 Giulia Martinelli Italy

=== Heats ===
Qualified: First 4 in each heat (Q) and 4 best performers (q) advance to the Final

==== Summary ====
Rank	Name	Nationality	Time	Notes
1	Eva Krchová	Czech Republic	9:55.99	Q PB
2	Karoline Bjerkeli Grøvdal	Norway	9:56.23	Q
3	Jana Sussmann	Germany	9:56.84	Q
4	Giulia Martinelli	Italy	9:56.90	Q
5	Mariya Shatalova	Ukraine	9:56.91	q
6	Gülcan Mıngır	Turkey	10:01.18	Q
7	Matylda Szlęzak	Poland	10:03.00	Q
8	Eilish McColgan	United Kingdom	10:03.19	Q
9	Martina Tresch	Switzerland	10:05.60	Q
10	Poļina Jeļizarova	Latvia	10:10.50	q
11	Lucie Sekanová	Czech Republic	10:12.29	q
12	Özlem Kaya	Turkey	10:15.94	q
13	Klara Bodinson	Sweden	10:17.71	
14	Antonina Behnke	Poland	10:22.88	
15	Estefanía Tobal	Spain	10:26.11	
16	Tamara Polupan	Ukraine	10:28.22	PB
17	Fabienne Schlumpf	Switzerland	10:31.10	
18	Sandra Eriksson	Finland	10:33.76	
19	Aleksandra Lisowska	Poland	10:34.06	
20	Valeria Roffino	Italy	10:37.51	
21	Liliana Danci	Romania	10:48.73	
22	Elif Karabulut	Turkey	10:53.93	

==== Details ====
===== Heat 1 =====
14 July 2011 / 10:50

Rank	Name	Nationality	Time	Notes
1	Eva Krchová	Czech Republic	9:55.99	Q PB
2	Karoline Bjerkeli Grøvdal	Norway	9:56.23	Q
3	Jana Sussmann	Germany	9:56.84	Q
4	Giulia Martinelli	Italy	9:56.90	Q
5	Mariya Shatalova	Ukraine	9:56.91	q
6	Klara Bodinson	Sweden	10:17.71	
7	Fabienne Schlumpf	Switzerland	10:31.10	
8	Sandra Eriksson	Finland	10:33.76	
9	Aleksandra Lisowska	Poland	10:34.06	
10	Liliana Danci	Romania	10:48.73	
11	Elif Karabulut	Turkey	10:53.93	

Intermediate times:
1000m: 3:16.60 Karoline Bjerkeli Grøvdal Norway
2000m: 6:36.51 Karoline Bjerkeli Grøvdal Norway

===== Heat 2 =====
14 July 2011 / 11:06

Rank	Name	Nationality	Time	Notes
1	Gülcan Mıngır	Turkey	10:01.18	Q
2	Matylda Szlęzak	Poland	10:03.00	Q
3	Eilish McColgan	United Kingdom	10:03.19	Q
4	Martina Tresch	Switzerland	10:05.60	Q
5	Poļina Jeļizarova	Latvia	10:10.50	q
6	Lucie Sekanová	Czech Republic	10:12.29	q
7	Özlem Kaya	Turkey	10:15.94	q
8	Antonina Behnke	Poland	10:22.88	
9	Estefanía Tobal	Spain	10:26.11	
10	Tamara Polupan	Ukraine	10:28.22	PB
11	Valeria Roffino	Italy	10:37.51	

Intermediate times:
1000m: 3:22.80 Eilish McColgan United Kingdom
2000m: 6:46.63 Martina Tresch Switzerland

== Participation ==
According to an unofficial count, 22 athletes from 14 countries participated in the event.

- Czech Republic (2)
- Finland (1)
- Germany (1)
- Italy (2)
- Latvia (1)
- Norway (1)
- Poland (3)
- Romania (1)
- Spain (1)
- Sweden (1)
- Switzerland (2)
- Turkey (3)
- Ukraine (2)
- United Kingdom (1)
