= 2024 European Athletics Championships – Women's 3000 metres steeplechase =

Women's 3000 metres steeplechase at the 2024 European Athletics Championships
- Venue: Stadio Olimpico
- Location: Rome
- Dates: 7 June (heats); 9 June (final)
- Competitors: 34 from 20 nations
- Winning time: 9:16.22 EL

Medalists
gold medal	Alice Finot	France
silver medal	Gesa Felicitas Krause	Germany
bronze medal	Elizabeth Bird	Great Britain

The women's 3000 metres steeplechase at the 2024 European Athletics Championships took place at the Stadio Olimpico from 7 to 9 June.

== Records ==
Standing records prior to the 2024 European Athletics Championships
World record	Beatrice Chepkoech (KEN)	8:44.32	Monaco	20 July 2018
European record	Gulnara Samitova-Galkina (RUS)	8:58.81	Beijing, China	17 August 2008
Championship record	Luiza Gega (ALB)	9:11.31	Munich, Germany	20 August 2022
World Leading	Peruth Chemutai (UGA)	8:55.09	Eugene, United States	25 May 2024
Europe Leading	Gesa Felicitas Krause (GER)	9:16.24	Suzhou, China	27 April 2024

== Schedule ==
Date	Time	Round
7 June 2024	13:05	Round 1
9 June 2024	22:04	Final

All times are local times (UTC+2)

== Results ==
=== Round 1 ===
The first 8 of each heat (Q) advanced to the final.

Rank	Heat	Name	Nationality	Time	Note
1	2	Alice Finot	France	9:29.28	Q, SB
2	2	Alicja Konieczek	Poland	9:29.76	Q
3	1	Stella Rutto	Romania	9:30.00	Q
4	1	Lea Meyer	Germany	9:30.63	Q
5	2	Ilona Mononen	Finland	9:31.08	Q, NU23R
6	1	Gesa Felicitas Krause	Germany	9:31.52	Q
7	1	Kinga Królik	Poland	9:31.84	Q
8	2	Elizabeth Bird	Great Britain	9:32.87	Q, SB
9	2	Emilia Lillemo	Sweden	9:33.01	Q, PB
10	2	Carolina Robles	Spain	9:33.79	Q
11	1	Aude Clavier	France	9:34.54	Q
12	1	Linn Söderholm	Sweden	9:34.62	Q, PB
13	2	Olivia Gürth	Germany	9:34.69	Q
14	1	Irene Sánchez-Escribano	Spain	9:34.80	Q
15	2	Adva Cohen	Israel	9:35.41	Q, SB
16	1	Luiza Gega	Albania	9:35.77	Q
17	2	Aneta Konieczek	Poland	9:41.23	
18	1	Juliane Hvid	Denmark	9:42.32	
19	1	Laura Maasik	Estonia	9:44.20	NR
20	1	Derya Kunur	Turkey	9:44.51	
21	1	Andreea Stavila	Moldova	9:45.35	PB
22	1	Sümeyye Erol	Turkey	9:45.36	
23	2	Nataliya Strebkova	Ukraine	9:45.71	
24	1	Michelle Finn	Ireland	9:46.93	SB
25	2	Tuğba Güvenç	Turkey	9:53.37	
26	1	Lena Millonig	Austria	9:57.50	
27	2	Flavie Renouard	France	9:59.29	
28	2	Julia Samuelsson	Sweden	10:01.65	
29	1	Eleonora Curtabbi	Italy	10:05.30	
30	2	Blanca Fernández	Spain	10:08.59	
31	2	Zita Urbán	Hungary	10:14.39	
32	2	Maria Mihaela Blaga	Romania	10:32.84	
	1	Chiara Scherrer	Switzerland	DNF	
	2	Shirley Lang	Switzerland	DNF	

=== Final ===
The final was started on 9 June 2024 at 22:04.

Rank	Name	Nationality	Time	Note
1st place, gold medalist(s)	Alice Finot	France	9:16.22	EL
2nd place, silver medalist(s)	Gesa Felicitas Krause	Germany	9:18.06	
3rd place, bronze medalist(s)	Elizabeth Bird	Great Britain	9:18.39	SB
4	Stella Rutto	Romania	9:22.36	PB
5	Luiza Gega	Albania	9:22.92	SB
6	Ilona Mononen	Finland	9:23.28	EU23L, NR
7	Alicja Konieczek	Poland	9:23.28	
8	Carolina Robles	Spain	9:23.75	PB
9	Lea Meyer	Germany	9:27.85	
10	Irene Sánchez-Escribano	Spain	9:27.97	
11	Olivia Gürth	Germany	9:31.98	
12	Adva Cohen	Israel	9:33.88	
13	Kinga Królik	Poland	9:37.63	
14	Emilia Lillemo	Sweden	9:38.34	
15	Aude Clavier	France	9:46.70	
16	Linn Söderholm	Sweden	9:54.14	
