= Aleksandra Lisowska =

Aleksandra Lisowska may refer to:

- Aleksandra Lisowska (runner) (born 1990), Polish long-distance runner
- the possible birth name of Roxelana or Hürrem Sultan (c. 1504 – 1558), consort and wife of Ottoman Sultan Suleiman the Magnificent
