= 2017 World Championships in Athletics – Women's 3000 metres steeplechase =

Women's 3000 metres steeplechase at the 2017 World Championships
- Venue: Olympic Stadium
- Dates: 9 August (heats); 11 August (final)
- Competitors: 41 from 24 nations
- Winning time: 9:02.58

Medalists
gold medal	Emma Coburn	United States
silver medal	Courtney Frerichs	United States
bronze medal	Hyvin Jepkemoi	Kenya

Video on YouTube Official Video

The women's 3000 metres steeplechase at the 2017 World Championships in Athletics was held at the London Olympic Stadium on 9 and 11 August.

== Summary ==
Six-time US steeplechase champion Emma Coburn made history by becoming the first American since 1952 to win a world steeplechase title. In the process, the 26-year-old Olympic bronze medalist set a championship record of 9:02.58 and broke her own American record by five seconds. She finished just ahead of her teammate Courtney Frerichs, who ran a personal best of 9:03.77 to capture silver. The 1-2 finish was the first ever by Americans in any world championship distance race. Defending champion and Olympic silver medalist Hyvin Jepkemoi of Kenya took the bronze in 9:04.03.

Coburn's gold medal performance came against the best field ever assembled for a world steeplechase final consisting of Area champions, World medalists, Olympians, and four of the five fastest women in the world.

== Lead up to 2017 London ==
The women's 3000 metres steeplechase was first introduced at the 2005 Helsinki World Championships. It didn't take long for Kenyan-born women to dominate the event winning two gold, two silver and four bronze medals in ten years. Milcah Chemos was first to strike gold at 2013 Moscow, followed by Hyvin Jepkemoi's world title at 2015 Beijing. The women's steeplechase became an Olympic event in 2008 where Kenyan-born women began to dominate, too. Ruth Jebet took Olympic gold at 2016 Rio and Hyvin Jepkemoi captured the silver medal. At the 2008 Olympics Kenya won silver and followed with a bronze medal performance in 2012.

Kenyan-born women had established record times, too. In just one year leading up to 2017 London, four runners would post times equal to or below the 9-minute mark that would rank them first, second, fourth and fifth on all-time list for fastest women in a 3000 metres steeplechase; Ruth Jebet at 8:52.78, Celliphine Chespol at 8:58.78, Hyvin Jepkemoi at 9:00.01 and Beatrice Chepkoech at 9:00.70.

When the field for the 2017 London final was announced it was not surprising to see the line-up dominated by six Kenyan-born runners, although it was remarkable. The rules allow for a country to have only three entrants; however, Kenya gained a fourth spot for Hyvin Jepkemoi using the wild card entry reserved for defending champions. Running for Bahrain were two Kenyan expatriates; Ruth Jebet, the world record holder and Olympic champion, and 17-year-old Winfred Mutile Yavi.

The Kenyan national team featured Beatrice Chepkoech, the number one ranked runner in 2017, fourth-place finisher at the 2016 Olympics and third fastest in the world in 2017; Purity Kirui, 2014 Commonwealth Games champion, and Celliphine Chespol, reigning World U20 champion, who in May 2017 recorded the second fastest time in history for a women's steeplechase winning in 8:58.78 at the Prefontaine Classic in Eugene, Oregon.

2017 saw a dramatic rise in performances amongst all women steeplechasers with 21 of the 31 fastest times in history run that year. Many races saw winning times well below the 9:42.00 qualifying standard with several victories occurring below 9:15.00. Medal hopefuls knew the 2017 London final would be run at a very fast pace and it would require outrunning the Kenyans. Jebet was the prerace favorite but was expected to be strongly challenged by Chepkoech for the title.

There were three preliminary heats at 2017 London in which the first three finishers in each heat qualified for the final plus the next overall six fastest runners. There were three notable athletes who failed to make the final or later withdrew. American Colleen Quigley finished third in the first heat but was later disqualified after the referee ruled an inside border lane infringement. On two separate occasions Quigley stepped on the inside white line that divides the track from the infield while exiting the water jump area. Quigley's disqualification allowed the fourth-place finisher, Kenya's Purity Kirui, to advance to the final. In the same preliminary heat, 2012 Olympic silver medalist Sofia Assefa from Ethiopia failed to qualify. She fell victim to a slow-paced race, finishing sixth, as she was unable to out-kick a six-person sprint to the finish. Assefa's finishing position was upgraded to fifth due to Quigley's disqualification. In the second heat, Ethiopian Birtukan Fente fell while crossing a water jump, injuring herself. Although she qualified, she later withdrew from the final.

== Race Details ==
When the gun sounded to begin the final, Kenya's Beatrice Chepkoech went to the front and set a fast pace. There is a partial (half) lap at the beginning of all steeplechase races before the runners begin going over barriers. After the partial lap there are seven laps remaining in the race with 28 barriers and 7 water jumps to clear.

Just one minute and 23 seconds into the race, and after going over the first three barriers, front-runner Chepkoech missed the inside turn for the water jump by continuing to run the track's oval as if it was a non-steeplechase event. A couple of runners started to follow her causing several runners to bump into each other. All but Chepkoech realized the mistake and ran towards the jump. It was only after hearing the reaction from the crowd and her teammate Chespol call to her, did she realize her error. To avoid being disqualified Chepkoech backtracked about 15 metres and cleared the jump, losing seven seconds to the leaders. Out of the chaos, Bahrain's Yavi took the lead followed by the two Americans, Coburn and Frerichs, then Jepkemoi, with Chepkoech now sprinting to catch the field.

On lap two, at the 2:12 mark, despite having trailed by 7 seconds, Chepkoech made a strong comeback, caught the field and worked her way into the middle of the pack. Moments later after clearing the second barrier she stumbled badly and fell, causing another runner to fall, and others needing to maneuver around the downed runners. German Olympian and 2015 World bronze medalist Gesa Felicitas Krause was an unfortunate recipient who found herself lying on the track and soon to be in last place. She righted herself to resume the race but would finish in ninth place. The turmoil at the rear of the pack suddenly caused a six-women breakaway to unfold consisting of Yavi, Jebet, Jepkemoi, Chespol, and the two Americans. Kenya's Purity Cherotich Kirui found herself halfway between both groups in seventh position, trailing the leaders by roughly six metres.

At 2:41, after crossing the water jump for the second time, Bahrain's Ruth Jebet passed Yavi to take the lead and stepped up the pace. Coburn and Frerichs, accepted the Bahraini's solid pace and settled into the rear of the lead pack occupying the fifth and sixth positions.

The first 1,000 metres were covered in 3:02.74.

Making her way through the fallen runner turmoil, Chepkoech managed to right herself and once again sprinted to catch the breakaway pack, eventually catching them at the 3:17 mark. By 3:52 she worked her way into fourth place before eventually moving into third. Jebet remained the leader for the next four and one-half laps setting a blistering pace. Only one woman, Chespol, had run under nine minutes in 2017; all eyes were now on the clock.

The second kilometre was covered in 3:00.86, with the first 2,000 metres run in 6:03.60.

The middle laps were mostly a six-person race as Bahrain's Yavi was dropped by the lead pack at the 4:30 mark.

At the 7:10 mark, the American Coburn began closing the gap between herself and the leader Jebet. She went from fifth place into third and would have likely moved to the front, however the other runners picked up on her challenge and held her off by stepping up the pace. At this point, the youngster Chespol, the reigning U20 world champion, could not respond to the fast pace and faded from the group.

Around the 7:50 mark, Kenya's Chepkoech regained the lead and when the bell rang at 7:54 signaling the final lap, a five-person breakaway remained with Coburn in second place, positioned just off Chepkoech's outside shoulder, followed by Jebet, Jepkemoi, and Frerichs.

When the group traversed the second barrier, with 300 metres remaining, Frerichs made a strong move to become the leader. Going down the back stretch she accelerated and ran should-to-shoulder with Chepkoech and Jepkemoi with Coburn a stride back. The fierce pace caused Bahrain's Jebet, the world record holder and 2016 Olympic champion to fade. With 250 metres to go the lead pack consisted of two Kenyans and two Americans runners.

At the 8:26 mark, the leaders crossed over the third barrier with Frerichs and Jepkemoi still running shoulder-to-shoulder followed closely by Coburn and then Chepkoech. The fast pace and energy expended to make up for earlier mistakes in the race was now having its effect on Chepkoech, as she began to slow, unable to keep up with the aggressive push by the Americans to overtake her teammate Jepkemoi.

As the three lead runners approached the last water jump Coburn made a decisive move and one which would allow her to capture gold. Coming into the turn, Jepkemoi lined up her approach so that she would go over the center of the water jump. By doing this, she forced Frerichs, who was on Jepkemoi's outside shoulder, to run wide and approach the jump from an outside tact. Seeing this, Coburn cut sharply and took advantage of the shorter, inside path, arriving at the jump just a few tenths of a second ahead of the other two runners. Coburn, known for her superior form and leaping ability, was the first over the jump at 8:40. Frerichs landed second then quickly cut in front of Jepkemoi, who struggled to make her way out of the water pit.

Coburn, leading for the first time in the race, accelerated around the final turn and headed for the home stretch. She cleared the final barrier at 8:53 and sprinted to the finish, opening up a seven-metre lead over her teammate Frerichs. Coburn crossed the finish line at 9:02.58 for the gold medal. In an exciting duel, Frerichs was able to hold off Jepkemoi over the last 100 metres to take the silver, finishing with a personal best of 9:03.77. Jepkemoi took the bronze in 9:04.03 and Chepkoech finished fourth at 9:10.45.

It was the first time Americans, men or women, had ever finished 1–2 in any world championship distance race.

The final kilometre was covered in 2:58.98

Coburn's time set a Continental record, Championship record, American record and was a personal best. Her performance ranks as sixth fastest on the all-time list for the women's 3000-metres steeplechase event; one spot ahead of Frerichs. Four of the five athletes ahead of them on the all-time list finished behind them in this race.

== Records ==
Before the competition records were as follows:

Record	Perf.	Athlete	Nat.	Date	Location
World record	8:52.78	Ruth Jebet	BHR	27 Aug 2016	Saint-Denis, France
Championship	9:06.57	Yekaterina Volkova	RUS	27 Aug 2007	Osaka, Japan
World leading	8:58.78	Celliphine Chepteek Chespol	KEN	26 May 2017	Eugene, United States
African	8:58.78	Celliphine Chepteek Chespol	KEN	26 May 2017	Eugene, United States
Asian	8:52.78	Ruth Jebet	BHR	27 Aug 2016	Saint-Denis, France
NACAC	9:07.63	Emma Coburn	USA	15 Aug 2016	Rio de Janeiro, Brazil
South American	9:38.63	Juliana Paula dos Santos	BRA	6 Jun 2016	Prague, Czech Republic
European	8:58.81	Gulnara Samitova-Galkina	RUS	17 Aug 2008	Beijing, China
Oceanian	9:14.28	Genevieve Lacaze	AUS	27 Aug 2016	Saint-Denis, France

The following records were set at the competition:

Record	Perf.	Athlete	Nat.	Date
Championship	9:02.58	Emma Coburn	USA	11 Aug 2017
NACAC	9:02.58	Emma Coburn	USA	11 Aug 2017
American	9:02.58	Emma Coburn	USA	11 Aug 2017
South American	9:35.78	Belén Casetta	ARG	9 Aug 2017
South American	9:25.99	Belén Casetta	ARG	11 Aug 2017
Canadian	9:29.99	Geneviève Lalonde	CAN	11 Aug 2017

== Qualification standard ==
The standard to qualify automatically for entry was 9:42.00.

== Schedule ==
The event schedule, in local time (UTC+1), is as follows:

Date	Time	Round
9 August	19:05	Heats
11 August	21:25	Final

== Results ==
=== Heats ===
The first round took place on 9 August in three heats as follows:

Heat	1	2	3
Start time	19:05	19:22	19:40
Photo finish	link	link	link

The first three in each heat ( Q ) and the next six fastest ( q ) qualified for the final. The overall results were as follows:

Rank	Heat	Name	Nationality	Time	Notes
1	2	Beatrice Chepkoech	Kenya	9:19.03	Q
2	2	Ruth Jebet	Bahrain	9:19.52	Q
3	2	Courtney Frerichs	United States	9:25.14	Q
4	2	Aisha Praught	Jamaica	9:26.37	q
5	3	Celliphine Chepteek Chespol	Kenya	9:27.35	Q
6	3	Emma Coburn	United States	9:27.42	Q
7	3	Genevieve LaCaze	Australia	9:27.53	Q, SB
8	3	Winfred Mutile Yavi	Bahrain	9:28.00	q
9	2	Geneviève Lalonde	Canada	9:31.81	q, SB
10	3	Etenesh Diro	Ethiopia	9:31.87	q
11	2	Birtukan Fente	Ethiopia	9:33.99	q, SB
12	3	Belén Casetta	Argentina	9:35.78	q, AR
13	3	Fabienne Schlumpf	Switzerland	9:36.08	
14	2	Özlem Kaya	Turkey	9:37.06	SB
15	1	Gesa Felicitas Krause	Germany	9:39.86	Q
16	1	Hyvin Jepkemoi	Kenya	9:39.89	Q
17	1	Purity Cherotich Kirui	Kenya	9:40.53	Q
18	1	Fadwa Sidi Madane	Morocco	9:40.61	
19	1	Sofia Assefa	Ethiopia	9:40.88	
20	3	Peruth Chemutai	Uganda	9:43.04	
21	2	Anna Emilie Møller	Denmark	9:44.12	
22	1	Irene Sánchez-Escribano	Spain	9:46.59	
23	2	Maria Larsson	Sweden	9:48.13	
24	1	Maeva Danois	France	9:49.21	
25	3	Rosie Clarke	Great Britain & N.I.	9:49.36	
26	1	Alycia Butterworth	Canada	9:51.50	
27	3	Viktória Gyürkés	Hungary	9:52.66	
28	2	Amina Bettiche	Algeria	9:53.06	
29	1	Mariya Shatalova	Ukraine	9:54.21	
30	1	Lennie Waite	Great Britain & N.I.	9:54.97	
31	1	Tigest Getent	Bahrain	9:55.42	
32	3	Maria Bernard	Canada	9:59.45	
33	2	Victoria Mitchell	Australia	10:00.40	
34	3	Francesca Bertoni	Italy	10:01.36	
35	3	María José Pérez	Spain	10:01.84	
36	2	Camilla Richardsson	Finland	10:07.04	
37	1	Lucie Sekanová	Czech Republic	10:09.67	
38	3	Tuğba Güvenç	Turkey	10:13.03	
39	1	Charlotta Fougberg	Sweden	10:21.21	
40	2	Teresa Urbina	Spain	10:21.90	
	1	Colleen Quigley	United States	DQ	R 163.3(b)
	2	Luiza Gega	Albania	DNS	

=== Final ===
The final took place on 11 August at 21:25. The results were as follows: (photo finish)

Rank	Name	Nationality	Time	Notes
1st place, gold medalist(s)	Emma Coburn	United States	9:02.58	CR, AR
2nd place, silver medalist(s)	Courtney Frerichs	United States	9:03.77	PB
3rd place, bronze medalist(s)	Hyvin Jepkemoi	Kenya	9:04.03	
4	Beatrice Chepkoech	Kenya	9:10.45	
5	Ruth Jebet	Bahrain	9:13.96	
6	Celliphine Chepteek Chespol	Kenya	9:15.04	
7	Etenesh Diro	Ethiopia	9:22.46	
8	Winfred Mutile Yavi	Bahrain	9:22.67	PB
9	Gesa Felicitas Krause	Germany	9:23.87	
10	Purity Cherotich Kirui	Kenya	9:25.62	
11	Belén Casetta	Argentina	9:25.99	AR
12	Genevieve LaCaze	Australia	9:26.25	SB
13	Geneviève Lalonde	Canada	9:29.99	NR
	Aisha Praught	Jamaica	DQ	R 163.3(b)
	Birtukan Fente	Ethiopia	DNS	
