= 2014 European Athletics Championships – Women's 3000 metres steeplechase =

Women's 3000 metres steeplechase at the European Athletics Championships

The women's 3000 metre steeplechase at the 2014 European Athletics Championships took place at the Letzigrund on 15 and 17 August.

== Medalists ==
Gold	Antje Möldner-Schmidt; Germany
Silver	Charlotta Fougberg; Sweden
Bronze	Diana Martín; Spain

== Records ==
Standing records prior to the 2014 European Athletics Championships
World record	Gulnara Samitova (RUS)	8:58.81	Beijing, PR China	17 August 2008
European record	Gulnara Samitova (RUS)	8:58.81	Beijing, PR China	17 August 2008
Championship record	Yuliya Zarudneva (RUS)	9:17.57	Barcelona, Spain	30 July 2010
World Leading	Hiwot Ayalew (ETH)	9:10.64	Glasgow, Great Britain	12 July 2014
European Leading	Charlotta Fougberg (SWE)	9:23.96	Glasgow, Great Britain	12 July 2014

== Schedule ==
Date	Time	Round
15 August 2014	11:13	Round 1
17 August 2014	16:08	Final

All times are local times (UTC+2)

== Results ==
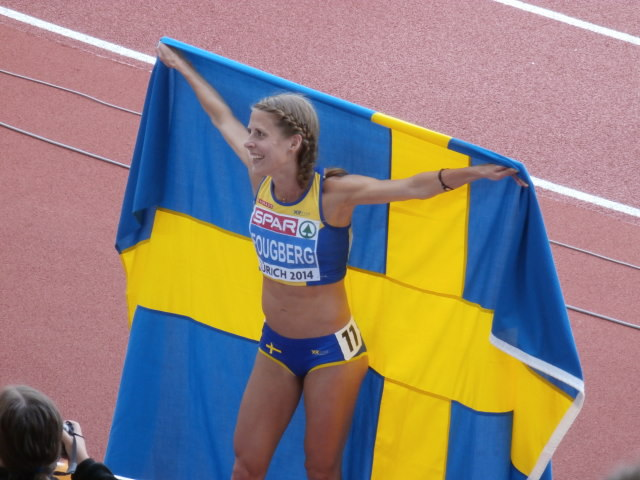
Charlotta Fougberg finished second

=== Round 1 ===
Rank	Heat	Name	Nationality	Time	Note
1	1	Sviatlana Kudzelich	Belarus	9:46.89	Q
2	1	Natalya Vlasova	Russia	9:47.31	Q
3	1	Gesa-Felicitas Krause	Germany	9:47.36	Q
4	1	Sandra Eriksson	Finland	9:50.00	Q
5	1	Fabienne Schlumpf	Switzerland	9:51.45	Q
6	1	Maruša Mišmaš	Slovenia	9:51.51	q
7	2	Silvia Danekova	Bulgaria	9:51.67	Q
8	2	Antje Möldner-Schmidt	Germany	9:52.02	Q
9	2	Charlotta Fougberg	Sweden	9:52.04	Q
10	2	Polina Jelizarova	Latvia	9:52.58	Q, SB
11	2	Diana Martín	Spain	9:52.63	Q
12	2	Katarzyna Kowalska	Poland	9:52.66	q
13	2	Johanna Lehtinen	Finland	9:53.86	q
14	1	Özlem Kaya	Turkey	9:56.49	q
15	1	Cristina Casandra	Romania	10:00.48	q
16	1	Jekaterina Patjuk	Estonia	10:03.60	
17	2	Valeria Roffino	Italy	10:07.58	
18	2	Jana Sussmann	Germany	10:07.99	
19	2	Yekaterina Sokolenko	Russia	10:08.76	
20	2	Astrid Leutert	Switzerland	10:15.29	
21	1	Ingeborg Løvnes	Norway	10:18.11	
	1	Teresa Urbina	Spain	DNF	

=== Final ===
Rank	Name	Nationality	Time	Note
1st place, gold medalist(s)	Antje Möldner-Schmidt	Germany	9:29.43	SB
2nd place, silver medalist(s)	Charlotta Fougberg	Sweden	9:30.16	
3rd place, bronze medalist(s)	Diana Martín	Spain	9:30.70	PB
4	Sviatlana Kudzelich	Belarus	9:30.99	PB
5	Gesa-Felicitas Krause	Germany	9:35.46	SB
6	Natalya Vlasova	Russia	9:36.99	
7	Katarzyna Kowalska	Poland	9:43.09	
8	Silvia Danekova	Bulgaria	9:44.81	
9	Sandra Eriksson	Finland	9:47.95	
10	Maruša Mišmaš	Slovenia	9:54.75	
11	Johanna Lehtinen	Finland	9:54.90	
12	Cristina Casandra	Romania	9:55.42	
13	Fabienne Schlumpf	Switzerland	9:55.92	
14	Özlem Kaya	Turkey	10:06.68	
	Polina Jelizarova	Latvia	DNF	
