= 2013 European Athletics U23 Championships – Women's 3000 metres steeplechase =

The Women's 3000 metres steeplechase event at the 2013 European Athletics U23 Championships was held in Tampere, Finland, at Ratina Stadium on 13 July.

== Medalists ==
Gold	Gesa-Felicitas Krause; Germany
Silver	Yekaterina Sokolenko; Russia
Bronze	Evdokiya Bukina; Russia

== Results ==
=== Final ===
13 July 2013

Rank	Name	Nationality	Time	Notes
1st place, gold medalist(s)	Gesa-Felicitas Krause	Germany	9:38.91	CUR
2nd place, silver medalist(s)	Yekaterina Sokolenko	Russia	9:49.34	
3rd place, bronze medalist(s)	Evdokiya Bukina	Russia	10:03.41	
4	Maria Borglund	Sweden	10:13.02	
5	Cécile Chevillard	France	10:21.82	
6	Sofie Lövdahl	Finland	10:21.91	PB
7	Camilla Richardsson	Finland	10:24.69	
8	Cléa Formaz	Switzerland	10:27.76	
9	Viivi Rantanen	Finland	10:34.81	
10	Anastasiya Puzakova	Belarus	10:38.89	
11	Sofie Gallein	Belgium	10:40.08	
	Athiná Koíni	Greece	DNF	

Intermediate times:
1000m: 3:12.56 Gesa-Felicitas Krause Germany
2000m: 6:27.88 Gesa-Felicitas Krause Germany

== Participation ==
According to an unofficial count, 12 athletes from 9 countries participated in the event.

- Belarus (1)
- Belgium (1)
- Finland (3)
- France (1)
- Germany (1)
- Greece (1)
- Russia (2)
- Sweden (1)
- Switzerland (1)
