= Michelle Finn =

Michelle Finn may refer to:

- Michelle Finn-Burrell (born 1965), American sprinter
- Michelle Finn (steeplechaser) (born 1989), Irish middle-distance runner
