= Isabel Mattuzzi =

Italian middle-distance runner

Personal information
- National team: Italy
- Born: 23 April 1995 (age 31) Rovereto, Italy
- Height: 1.63 m (5 ft 4 in)
- Weight: 47 kg (104 lb)

Sport
- Sport: Athletics
- Event(s): 3000 metres steeplechase Long-distance running
- Club: US Quercia Trentingrana Rovereto
- Coached by: Dimitri Giordani
- Retired: 2021

Achievements and titles
- Personal bests: 3000 m st: 9:34.02 (2018); 5000 m: 15:53.89 (2019); 10,000 m: 32:36.50 (2019)
Medal record
Mediterranead U23 Championships
Bronze medal – third place	2016 Tunis	3000 m st

Isabel Mattuzzi (born 23 April 1995) is an Italian 3000 metres steeplechaseer, who won one national championship and who concluded at 35th place in the 2018 outdoor seasonal world lists of the 3000 metres steeplechase.

== Career ==
Mattuzzi retired at the young age of 26, one step away from qualifying for the Tokyo 2021 Olympics, to devote herself full-time to his true passion: studying and thus obtaining a master's degree.

== Personal Best ==
- 3000 metres steeplechase: 9:34.02 - (Germany) Berlin, 10 August 2018

== Achievements ==
Year	Competition	Venue	Position	Event	Time	Notes
2018	European Championships	(Germany) Berlin	Final 15th	3000 m steeplechase	9:43.90	

== National titles ==
- Italian Athletics Championships
  - 3000 m steeplechase: 2018, 2019
  - 10,000 m: 2019

== See also ==
- Italian all-time lists - 3000 m steeplechase
