= Klara Bodinson =

Swedish athlete

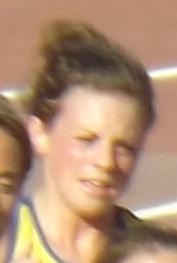
- Klara Bodinson in 2015

Personal information
- Born: 11 June 1990 (age 36)

Sport
- Country: Sweden
- Sport: Track and field
- Event: 3000 metres steeplechase
- Club: Sävedalens AIK

Klara Bodinson (born 11 June 1990) is a Swedish runner who competes primarily in the 3000 metres steeplechase. She represented her country at the 2015 World Championships in Athletics in Beijing without qualifying for the final. Her personal best in the event is 9:40.21 set in Ninove in 2015.

== Competition record ==
Year	Competition	Venue	Position	Event	Notes
Representing Sweden
2008	World Junior Championships	Bydgoszcz, Poland	19th (h)	3000 m s'chase	10:41.62
2009	European Junior Championships	Novi Sad, Serbia	8th	3000 m s'chase	10:22.21
2011	European U23 Championships	Ostrava, Czech Republic	13th (h)	3000 m s'chase	10:17.71
2015	World Championships	Beijing, China	30th (h)	3000 m s'chase	9:50.13
