= Viktória Wagner-Gyürkés =

Hungarian steeplechase runner

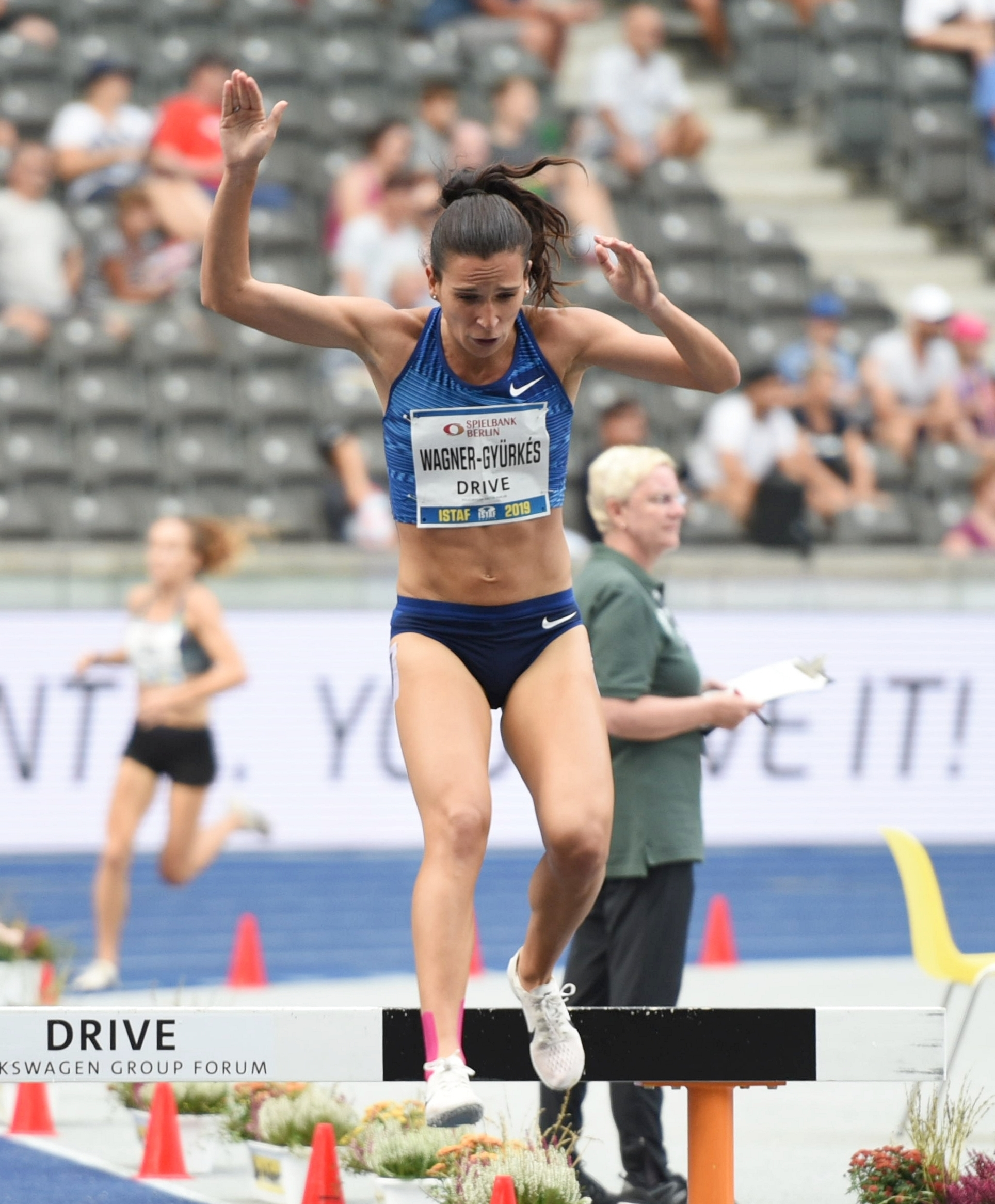
- Wagner-Gyürkés in 2019

Personal information
- Born: 15 October 1992 (age 33)
- Education: Semmelweis University

Sport
- Sport: Athletics
- Event: 3000 m steeplechase
- Club: Ikarus BSE
- Coached by: István Tomhauser

Viktória Wagner-Gyürkés (born 15 October 1992) is a Hungarian runner specialising in the 3000 metres steeplechase. She represented her country at the 2017 World Championships without reaching the final. In addition, she won the silver medal at the 2017 Summer Universiade.

== International competitions ==
Year	Competition	Venue	Position	Event	Notes
Representing Hungary
2007	World Youth Championships	Ostrava, Czech Republic	41st (h)	800 m	2:15.64
2009	European Youth Summer Olympic Festival	Tampere, Finland	8th	800 m	2:12.60
2009	World Youth Championships	Brixen, Italy	5th	800 m	2:10.07
2010	World Junior Championships	Moncton, Canada	23rd (h)	1500 m	4:23.51
2015	Universiade	Gwangju, South Korea	10th	3000 m s'chase	10:17.46
2016	European Championships	Amsterdam, Netherlands	22nd (h)	3000 m s'chase	9:59.08
2017	World Championships	London, United Kingdom	27th (h)	3000 m s'chase	9:52.66
2017	Universiade	Taipei, Taiwan	2nd	3000 m s'chase	9:52.17
2018	European Championships	Berlin, Germany	13th	3000 m s'chase	9:40.41
2019	European Indoor Championships	Glasgow, United Kingdom	9th	3000 m	9:03.56
2019	World Championships	Doha, Qatar	37th (h)	3000 m s'chase	9:52.11
2021	European Indoor Championships	Toruń, Poland	10th	3000 m	9:02.81
2022	European Championships	Munich, Germany	9th	5000 m	15:16.11
2023	World Championships	Budapest, Hungary	30th (h)	5000 m	15:29.42
2024	European Championships	Rome, Italy	12th	5000 m	15:17.45
2024	Olympic Games	Paris, France	37th (h)	5000 m	15:48.24
2025	European Running Championships	Leuven, Belgium	52nd	10 km	33:41

== Personal bests ==
Outdoor

- 1500 metres – 4:09.88 (Stockholm 2022)
- One mile – 4:34.25 (Székesfehérvár 2018)
- 3000 metres – 8:48.83 (Rovereto 2022)
- 5000 metres – 15:14.24 (Montesson 2023)
- 10,000 metres – 32:45.88 (Gödöllő 2024)
- 10 kilometres – 32:05 (Paderborn 2023)
- 2000 metres steeplechase – 6:09.48 (Berlin 2019)
- 3000 metres steeplechase – 9:30.10 (Nice 2021)

Indoor

- 800 metres – 2:06.19 (Budapest 2020)
- 1500 metres – 4:11.48 (Ostrava 2020)
- 3000 metres – 8:55.45 (Toruń 2021)
