= Camilla Richardsson =

Finnish athlete (born 1993)

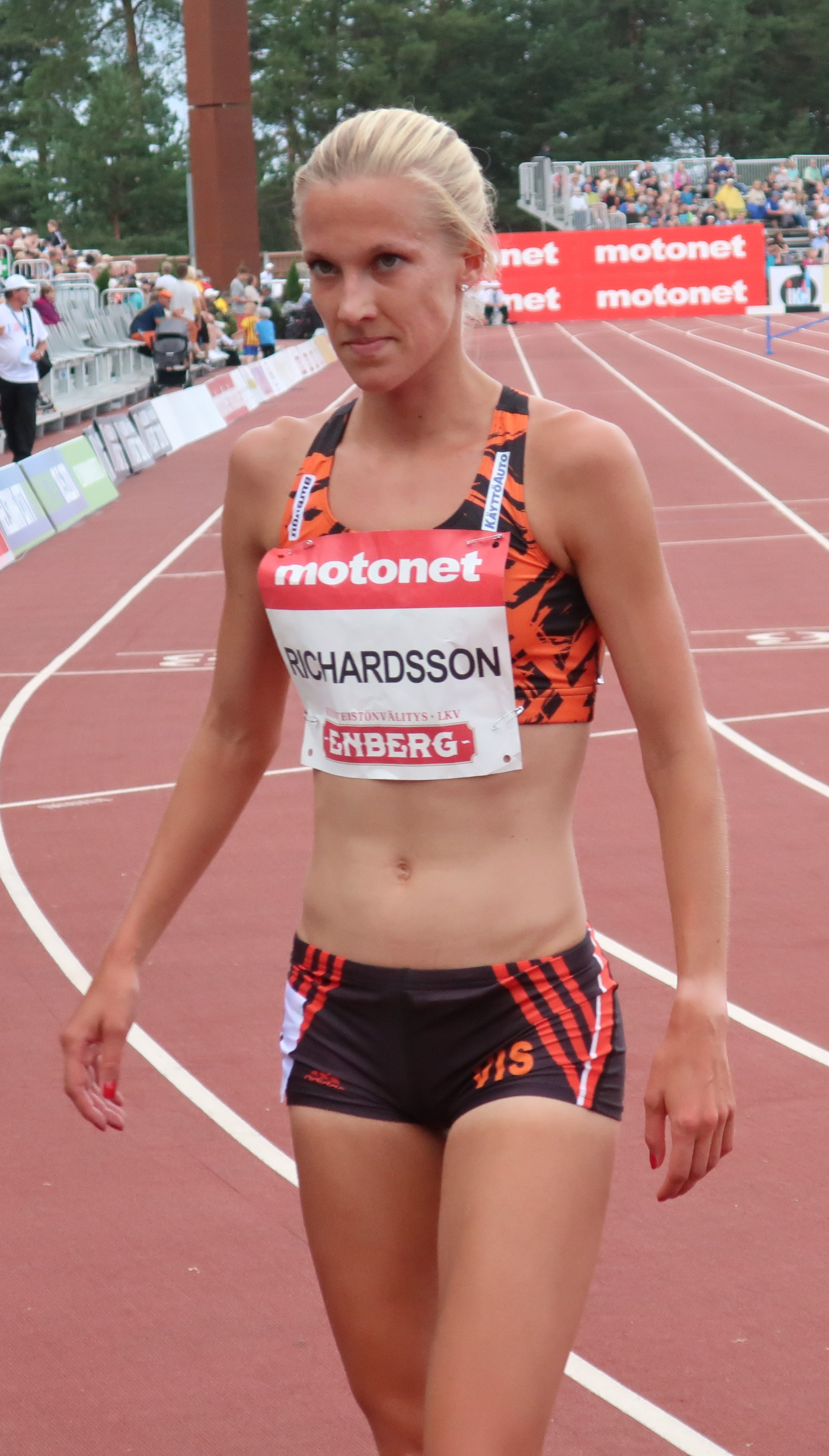
- Camilla Richardsson in 2018

Personal information
- Born: 14 September 1993 (age 32) Vaasa, Finland

Sport
- Sport: Track and field
- Event: 3000 metres steeplechase, 5000m, 10000m
- Club: Esbo IF
- Coached by: Moritz Keinath

Camilla Margareta Richardsson (born 14 September 1993) is a Finnish middle-distance runner. She competed at the 2015 World Championships in Athletics in Beijing, 2017 in London and 2019 in Doha without qualifying for the final. Her personal best in the event is 9:35.27 set in Joensuu in 2019. Richardsson is a Swedish-speaking Finn.

== Competition record ==
Year	Competition	Venue	Position	Event	Notes
Representing Finland
2011	European Junior Championships	Tallinn, Estonia	16th (h)	3000 m s'chase	10:47.83
2013	European U23 Championships	Tampere, Finland	7th	3000 m s'chase	10:24.69
2015	European U23 Championships	Tallinn, Estonia	9th	5000 m	15:57.95
2015	European U23 Championships	Tallinn, Estonia	4th	3000 m s'chase	9:46.34
2015	World Championships	Beijing, China	32nd (h)	3000 m s'chase	9:53.13
2016	European Championships	Amsterdam, Netherlands	20th (h)	3000 m s'chase	9:54.80
2017	World Championships	London, United Kingdom	36th (h)	3000 m s'chase	10:07.04
2019	World Championships	Doha, Qatar	38th (h)	3000 m s'chase	9:53.06
2022	World Championships	Eugene, United States	–	5000 m	DNF
2022	European Championships	Munich, Germany	10th	5000 m	15:20.94
2022	European Championships	Munich, Germany	9th	10,000 m	32:19.27
2023	European Indoor Championships	Istanbul, Turkey	12th	3000 m	8:57.13
2023	World Championships	Budapest, Hungary	24th (h)	5000 m	15:13.84
2023	World Championships	Budapest, Hungary	15th	10,000 m	32:15.74
