= Tuğba Güvenç Yenigün =

Turkish middle-distance runner

Tuğba Güvenç
Personal information
- Nationality: Turkish
- Born: 9 July 1994 (age 32)
- Height: 1.73 m (5 ft 8 in)
- Weight: 52 kg (115 lb)

Sport
- Country: Turkey
- Sport: Track and field
- Event: 3000 metres steeplechase
Medal record
Women's athletics
Representing Turkey
European Team Championships
Bronze medal – third place	2017 Lille	3000 m st.
European U23 Championships
Gold medal – first place	2015 Tallinn	3000 m st.
Islamic Solidarity Games
Silver medal – second place	2025 Riyadh	3000 m st.

Tuğba Güvenç (born 9 July 1994) is a Turkish middle-distance runner. She competed in the 3000 metres steeplechase event at the 2015 World Championships in Athletics in Beijing, China.

In 2017, she competed in the women's 3000 metres steeplechase event at the 2017 World Championships in Athletics held in London, United Kingdom. She did not advance to compete in the final.

== Competition record ==
Year	Competition	Venue	Position	Event	Notes
2015	European U23 Championships	Tallinn, Estonia	1st	3000 m s'chase	9:36.14
2015	World Championships	Beijing, China	35th (h)	3000 m s'chase	9:58.07
2016	Olympic Games	Rio de Janeiro, Brazil	41st (h)	3000 m s'chase	9:49.93
2017	Islamic Solidarity Games	Baku, Azerbaijan	4th	3000 m s'chase	9:26.09
2017	European Team Championships	Lille, France	3rd	3000 m s'chase	9:41.03
2017	World Championships	London, United Kingdom	38th (h)	3000 m s'chase	10:13.03
2017	Universiade	Taipei, Taiwan	1st	3000 m s'chase	9:51.27
2019	Universiade	Naples, Italy	8th	3000 m s'chase	10:08.19
2019	World Championships	Doha, Qatar	42nd (h)	3000 m s'chase	10:13.79
2022	Mediterranean Games	Oran, Algeria	–	3000 m s'chase	DNF
2022	European Championships	Munich, Germany	5th	3000 m s'chase	9:25.58
2023	World Championships	Budapest, Hungary	31st (h)	3000 m s'chase	9:50.96
2024	European Championships	Rome, Italy	25th (h)	3000 m s'chase	9:53.37
2025	Islamic Solidarity Games	Riyadh, Saudi Arabia	2nd	3000 m s'chase	9:57.05
2026	European Championships	Birmingham, United Kingdom	16th	3000 m s'chase	9:59.15
