= Gesa Felicitas Krause =

German steeplechase runner

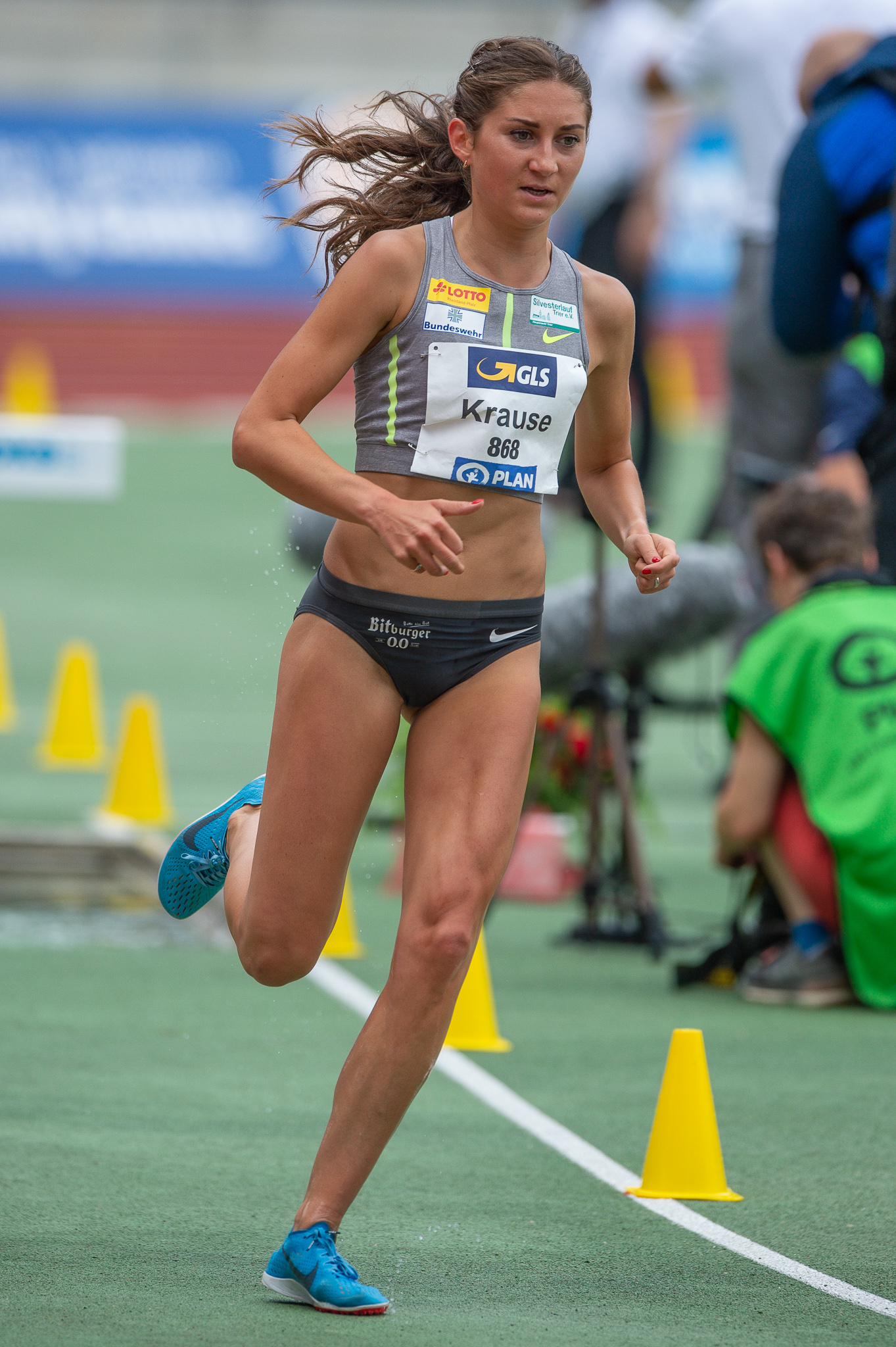
- Krause in 2018

Personal information
- Nationality: German
- Born: 3 August 1992 (age 34) Ehringshausen, Germany
- Height: 1.67 m (5 ft 6 in)
- Weight: 50 kg (110 lb)

Sport
- Country: Germany
- Sport: Athletics
- Event: 3000 m steeplechase

Achievements and titles
- Olympic finals: 2012; 3000 m steeple, 7th 2016; 3000 m steeple, 6th 2020; 3000 m steeple, 5th
- World finals: 2011; 3000 m steeple, 7th 2013; 3000 m steeple, 9th 2015; 3000 m steeple, Bronze; 2017; 3000 m steeple, 9th 2019; 3000 m steeple, Bronze
- Personal bests: 3000 m steeple: 9:03.30 NR (Doha 2019); 2000 m steeple: 5:52.80 WB (Berlin 2019); 5000 m: 15:24.53 (Shanghai 2017); 3000 m: 8:49.43(i) (Glasgow 2016); 1500 m: 4:06.99 (Stockholm 2016); 800 m: 2:04.45 (Dessau 2018)
Medal record
World Championships
Bronze medal – third place	2015 Beijing	3000 m steeplechase
Bronze medal – third place	2019 Doha	3000 m steeplechase
European Championships
Gold medal – first place	2016 Amsterdam	3000 m steeplechase
Gold medal – first place	2018 Berlin	3000 m steeplechase
Gold medal – first place	2026 Birmingham	3000 m steeplechase
Silver medal – second place	2024 Rome	3000 m steeplechase
Bronze medal – third place	2012 Helsinki	3000 m steeplechase
European U23 Championships
Gold medal – first place	2013 Tampere	3000 m steeplechase
European Junior Championships
Gold medal – first place	2011 Tallinn	3000 m steeplechase

Gesa Felicitas Krause (born 3 August 1992) is a German athlete who specialises in the 3000 m steeplechase. She won bronze medals in steeplechase at both the 2015 and 2019 World Championships, and represented Germany at the 2012, 2016, and 2021 Olympic Games. Her personal best for the 3000 m steeplechase is 9:03.30, which is also a national record. In 2019 Krause set a world best for the 2000 m steeplechase in 5:52.80.

== Career ==
In the 2013 European Athletics U23 Championships, she won in a new championship record time of 9:38.91 min. Her greatest achievements to date are her bronze medals at the 2015 World Championships and 2019 World Championships, as well as becoming the European Champinion in 2016, 2018 and 2026. Recently, she won her 7th national title and the first one since the birth of her daughter in a new championship best of 9:24:40min.

Krause is currently trained by Wolfgang Heinig, the husband and coach of the retired German marathon runner Katrin Dörre-Heinig.

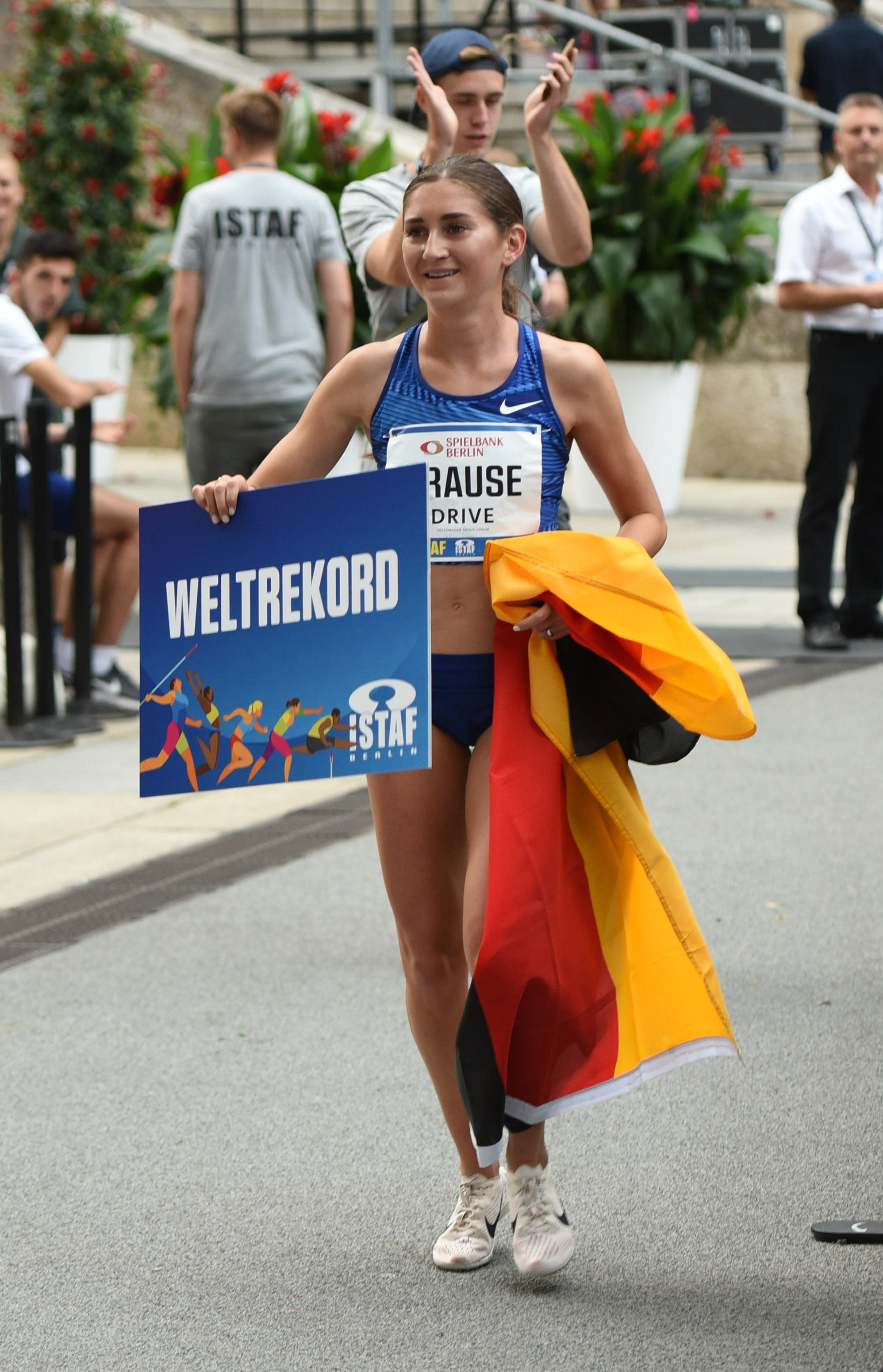
Gesa Felicitas Krause, celebrating her world best in 2000 m steeplechase at ISTAF Berlin 2019.

=== Personal bests ===
- 800 m: 2:03.09 min, Pfungstadt, Germany, 6 September 2017
- 1000 m: 2:41.59 min, Wehrheim, Germany, 31 July 2011
- 1500 m: 4:06.99 min, Stockholm, Sweden, 16 June 2016
- Mile: 4:29.58 min, Oslo, Norway, 9 June 2016
- 3000 m: 9:02.04 min, Hengelo, Netherlands, 24 May 2015
- 5000 m: 15:24.53 min, Shanghai, China, 13 May 2017
- 2000 m Steeplechase: 5:52.80 min, Berlin, Germany, 1 September 2019
- 3000 m Steeplechase: 9:03.30 min, Doha, Qatar, 30 September 2019

== Achievements ==
Year	Competition	Venue	Position	Event	Notes
Representing Germany
2009	World Youth Championships	Brixen, Italy	7th	2000 m steeplechase	6:39.85
2010	World Junior Championships	Moncton, New Brunswick, Canada	—	1500 m	DNF
2010	World Junior Championships	Moncton, New Brunswick, Canada	4th	3000 m steeplechase	9:47.78 NJR
2011	European Junior Championships	Tallinn, Estonia	1st	3000 m steeplechase	9:51.08, SB
2011	World Championships	Daegu, South Korea	7th	3000 m steeplechase	9:32.74, EJR
2012	German Championships	Bochum, Germany	4th	1500 m	4:11.94, SB
2012	European Championships	Helsinki, Finland	3rd	3000 m steeplechase	9:38.20
2012	Olympic Games	London, United Kingdom	7th	3000 m steeplechase	9:23.52, PB
2013	European U23 Championships	Tampere, Finland	1st	3000 m steeplechase	9:38.91, CUR
2013	World Championships	Moscow, Russia	9th	3000 m steeplechase	9:37.11, SB
2014	European Championships	Zurich, Switzerland	5th	3000 m steeplechase	9:35.46
2015	European Indoor Championships	Prague, Czech Republic	5th	1500 m	4:15.40
2015	European Indoor Championships	Prague, Czech Republic	14th (h)	3000 m	9:11.01
2015	World Relays	Nassau, Bahamas	5th	Distance medley relay	11:06.14
2015	World Championships	Beijing, China	3rd	3000 m steeplechase	9:19.25
2016	European Championships	Amsterdam, Netherlands	1st	3000 m steeplechase	9:18.87
2016	Olympic Games	Rio de Janeiro, Brazil	6th	3000 m steeplechase	9:18.41, NR
2017	World Championships	London, United Kingdom	9th	3000 m steeplechase	9:23.87
2018	European Championships	Berlin, Germany	1st	3000 m steeplechase	9:19.80
2019	World Championships	Doha, Qatar	3rd	3000 m steeplechase	9:03.30, NR
2021	European Indoor Championships	Toruń, Poland	8th	1500 m	4:24.26
2021	Olympic Games	Tokyo, Japan	5th	3000 m s'chase	9:14.00
2022	World Championships	Eugene, United States	15th	3000 m s'chase	9:52.66
2024	European Championships	Rome, Italy	2nd	3000 m s'chase	9:18.06
2024	Olympic Games	Paris, France	14th	3000 m s'chase	9:26.96
2026	European Championships	Birmingham, United Kingdom	1st	3000 m s'chase	9:12.69
