= Elizabeth Bird =

British athlete (born 1994)

Lizzie Bird
Personal information
- Nationality: British
- Born: 4 October 1994 (age 31) Manila, Philippines

Sport
- Sport: Athletics
- Event: 3000 metres steeplechase
- Club: Shaftesbury Barnet Harriers

Achievements and titles
- Personal bests: 1500 m: 4:06.56 (Leuven 2024); Mile: 4:30.67 (Dublin 2022); 3000 m steeplechase: 9:04.35 (Paris 2024) NR
Medal record
Women's athletics
Representing Great Britain
European Championships
| Bronze medal – third place | 2022 Munich | 3000 m steeplechase |
| Bronze medal – third place | 2024 Rome | 3000 m steeplechase |
Representing England
Commonwealth Games
| Silver medal – second place | 2022 Birmingham | 3000 m steeplechase |

Elizabeth Bird (born 4 October 1994) is a British athlete who specialises in the 3000 metres steeplechase. She won the silver medal at the 2022 Commonwealth Games and bronze medals at the 2022 and 2024 European Athletics Championships.

Bird is the current British record-holder in the 3000 m steeplechase with a time of 9:04.35. She is a three-time (2021, 2022 and 2024) British national champion.

== Early career ==
Bird began running in St Albans, and her first club was Hertfordshire Phoenix Athletic Club. She studied at Princeton University, graduating in Public and International Affairs in 2017. She was an NCAA Honorable Mention All-America honoree in the steeplechase in 2015 and was a four-time NCAA Regional qualifier. Bird was a two-time Ivy League champion in the steeplechase and part of the 4x800 m team that won a conference title in 2017 as well as being the Ivy League cross country champion in 2015.

== Career ==
Bird competed in the women's 3000 m steeplechase event at the 2019 World Athletics Championships and did not advance from the heats clocking a personal best of 9:30.13.

Having qualified for the delayed 2020 Tokyo Olympics in her specialist event, she reached the final after finishing fifth in her heat. In the final Bird broke the national record with a time of 9:19.68, placing ninth.

In July 2022, she did not qualify for the final at the World Athletics Championships held in Eugene, Oregon in a time of 9:23.17. About three weeks later, Bird won the silver medal at the Commonwealth Games Birmingham 2022 in a personal best of 9:17.79. She set new lifetime best and a British record of 9:07.87 at the Monaco Diamond League five days later. Also in August, she earned a bronze at the European Athletics Championships in Munich, clocking 9:23.18.

She won a second European bronze medal in the 3000m steeplechase at the 2024 European Athletics Championships in Rome. Bird was selected to represent Great Britain at the 2024 Summer Olympics where she finished seventh setting a new national record time of 9:04.35.

== Personal life ==
Bird lives in Reno with her partner, William. She studied for a master's degree in International Studies at the University of San Francisco between 2017 and 2018 but deferred a place at law school in Boulder, Colorado in order to focus on the 2020 Summer Olympics. She has been involved in advocacy and support for human rights organisation Detention Action.
