= Maria Larsson (athlete) =

Swedish steeplechase runner

Personal information
- Born: 24 March 1994 (age 32) Gothenburg, Sweden
- Education: University of Arizona
- Height: 5 ft 10 in (178 cm)

Sport
- Sport: Athletics
- Event: 3000 m steeplechase
- College team: Arizona Wildcats

Maria Larsson (born 24 March 1994 in Gothenburg) is a Swedish runner competing primarily in the 3000 metres steeplechase. She represented her country at the 2017 World Championships without reaching the final.

== International competitions ==
Year	Competition	Venue	Position	Event	Notes
Representing Sweden
2013	European Junior Championships	Rieti, Italy	4th	3000 m s'chase	10:12.83
2016	European Championships	Amsterdam, Netherlands	19th (h)	3000 m s'chase	9:50.16
2017	World Championships	London, United Kingdom	23rd (h)	3000 m s'chase	9:48.13

== Personal bests ==
Outdoor

- 1500 metres – 4:26.92 (Tempe 2014)
- 3000 metres – 9:27.09 (Gothenburg 2013)
- 5 kilometres – 16:24 (Carlsbad 2017)
- 10 kilometres – 34:37 (Stockholm 2016)
- 3000 metres steeplechase – 9:39.96 (Gothenburg 2017)
