= Matylda Kowal =

Polish athletics competitor

Personal information
- Full name: Matylda Róża Kowal
- Born: January 11, 1989 (age 37)
- Education: University of Rzeszów
- Height: 1.70 m (5 ft 7 in)
- Weight: 51 kg (112 lb)

Sport
- Country: Poland
- Sport: Athletics
- Event: 3000m steeplechase
- Club: Resovia Rzeszów (2007–2008); AZS AWF Kraków (2009–2013); Resovia Rzeszów (2014-)
- Coached by: Piotr Kowal (2014-)

Matylda Kowal (née Szlęzak; born 11 January 1989 in Rzeszów) is a Polish middle- and long-distance runner. She competed in the 3000 metres steeplechase at the 2012 Summer Olympics, placing 41st with a time of 10:08.84. She competed at the 2016 Summer Olympics.

== Competition record ==
| Year | Competition | Venue | Position | Event | Notes |
Representing Poland
| 2011 | European U23 Championships | Ostrava, Czech Republic | 4th | 3000 m s'chase | 9:48.77 |
| 2011 | Universiade | Shenzhen, China | 16th (h) | 3000 m s'chase | 10:11.79 |
| 2012 | European Championships | Helsinki, Finland | 16th (h) | 3000 m s'chase | 9:56.30 |
| 2012 | Olympic Games | London, United Kingdom | 41st (h) | 3000 m s'chase | 10:08.84 |
| 2016 | European Championships | Amsterdam, Netherlands | 14th | 3000 m s'chase | 9:57.27 |
| 2016 | Olympic Games | Rio de Janeiro, Brazil | 26th (h) | 3000 m s'chase | 9:35.13 |
| 2017 | Universiade | Taipei, Taiwan | 10th | 3000 m s'chase | 10:23.47 |
| 2018 | European Championships | Berlin, Germany | 24th (h) | 3000 m s'chase | 9:49.27 |

== Personal bests ==
- 1000 metres – 2:44.89 (Kraków 2011)
- 1500 metres – 4:15.14 (Trier 2018)
- 3000 metres – 9:04.03 (Gothenburg 2018)
- 5000 metres – 16:13.86 (Bydgoszcz 2011)
- 3000 metres steeplechase – 9:35.13 (Rio de Janeiro 2016)
