= Charlotta Fougberg =

Swedish steeplechase runner

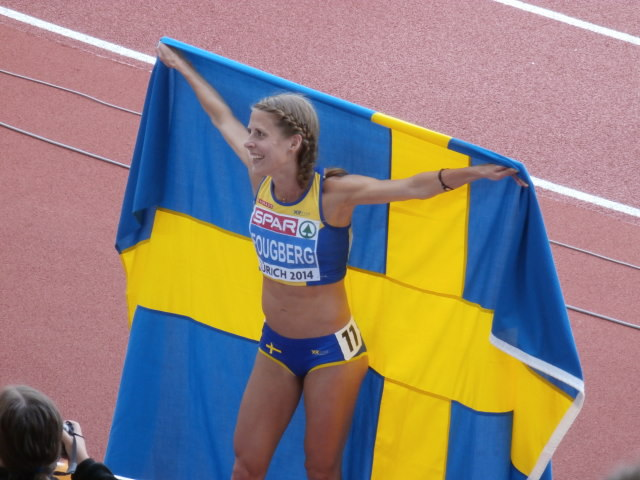

Personal information
- Born: 19 June 1985 (age 41) Lerum, Sweden
- Height: 1.65 m (5 ft 5 in)
- Weight: 51 kg (112 lb)

Sport
- Country: Sweden
- Sport: Track and field
- Event: 3000m steeplechase
Medal record
European Championships
Silver medal – second place	2014 Zürich	3000 m steeplechase

Charlotta Fougberg (born 19 June 1985) is a Swedish athlete who specializes in steeplechase. Fougberg was European number one in 3000 Meters steeplechase in 2014 and in that same year, she won a European Championships silver medal.

She set a Swedish 3000m steeplechase record when she won the 2014 IfAM Oordegem in 9:34.61.

== Competition record ==
Year	Competition	Venue	Position	Event	Notes
Representing Sweden
2013	European Indoor Championships	Gothenburg, Sweden	15th (h)	3000 m	9:21.15
2013	World Championships	Moscow, Russia	26th (h)	3000 m s'chase	9:59.17
2014	European Championships	Zürich, Switzerland	2nd	3000 m s'chase	9:30.16
2015	European Indoor Championships	Prague, Czech Republic	11th	3000 m	9:06.50
2015	World Championships	Beijing, China	31st (h)	3000 m s'chase	9:50.79
2016	Olympic Games	Rio de Janeiro, Brazil	18th (h)	3000 m s'chase	9:31.16
2017	European Indoor Championships	Belgrade, Serbia	12th	3000 m	9:09.53
2017	World Championships	London, United Kingdom	39th (h)	3000 m s'chase	10:21.21
2018	European Championships	Berlin, Germany	9th	5000 m	15:24.36
2018	European Championships	Berlin, Germany	6th	10,000 m	32:43.04
2019	World Championships	Doha, Qatar	18th	Marathon	2:49:17

== Personal bests ==
Outdoor

- 1500 metres – 4:11.89 (Karlstad 2014)
- 3000 metres – 8:58.56 (Oslo 2014)
- 5000 metres – 15:23.80 (Heusden-Zolder 2018)
- 10,000 metres – 32:34.47 (Tampere 2018)
- 5 kilometres – 16:01 (Vienna 2015)
- 10 kilometres – 32:51 (Malmö 2015)
- Half marathon – 1:10:19 (Gdynia 2020)
- 3000 metres steeplechase – 9:23.96 (Glasgow 2014)

Indoor

- 1500 metres – 4:14.19 (Växjö 2017)
- 3000 metres – 8:55.21 (Belgrade 2017)
