= 2010 World Junior Championships in Athletics – Women's 3000 metres steeplechase =

The women's 3000 metres steeplechase event at the 2010 World Junior Championships in Athletics was held in Monction Stadium (now Croix-Bleue Medavie Stadium) in Moncton, New Brunswick, Canada, on 20 and 22 July.

== Medalists ==
| Gold | Purity Cherotich Kirui; Kenya |
| Silver | Birtukan Adamu; Ethiopia |
| Bronze | Lucia Kamene Muangi; Kenya |

== Results ==
=== Final ===
22 July

| Rank | Name | Nationality | Time | Notes |
|---|---|---|---|---|
| 1st place, gold medalist(s) | Purity Cherotich Kirui | Kenya | 9:36.34 | |
| 2nd place, silver medalist(s) | Birtukan Adamu | Ethiopia | 9:43.23 | |
| 3rd place, bronze medalist(s) | Lucia Kamene Muangi | Kenya | 9:43.71 | |
| 4 | Gesa Felicitas Krause | Germany | 9:47.78 | |
| 5 | Almaz Ayana | Ethiopia | 9:48.08 | |
| 6 | Geneviève Lalonde | Canada | 9:57.74 | |
| 7 | Giulia Martinelli | Italy | 10:05.43 | |
| 8 | Estefania Tobal | Spain | 10:09.66 | |
| 9 | Sofie Gallein | Belgium | 10:23.07 | |
| 10 | Shelby Greany | United States | 10:27.33 | |
| 11 | Azucena Rodríguez | Mexico | 10:35.38 | |
| 12 | Eleanor Fulton | United States | 10:47.72 | |

=== Heats ===
20 July

==== Heat 1 ====
| Rank | Name | Nationality | Time | Notes |
|---|---|---|---|---|
| 1 | Purity Cherotich Kirui | Kenya | 9:52.77 | Q |
| 2 | Almaz Ayana | Ethiopia | 9:53.53 | Q |
| 3 | Gesa Felicitas Krause | Germany | 10:13.66 | Q |
| 4 | Estefania Tobal | Spain | 10:14.07 | Q |
| 5 | Shelby Greany | United States | 10:18.74 | q |
| 6 | Nawal Yahi | Algeria | 10:39.46 | |
| 7 | Viktoria Ivanova | Russia | 10:39.92 | |
| 8 | Caroline Mellsop | New Zealand | 10:40.08 | |
| 9 | Cécile Chevillard | France | 10:47.37 | |
| 10 | María José Pérez | Spain | 10:50.36 | |
| 11 | Celestina Malugani | Italy | 10:59.73 | |
| 12 | Danna Levin | Israel | 11:06.05 | |
| 13 | Chen Chao-Chun | Chinese Taipei | 11:19.81 | |

==== Heat 2 ====
| Rank | Name | Nationality | Time | Notes |
|---|---|---|---|---|
| 1 | Birtukan Adamu | Ethiopia | 10:01.46 | Q |
| 2 | Geneviève Lalonde | Canada | 10:03.88 | Q |
| 3 | Lucia Kamene Muangi | Kenya | 10:10.69 | Q |
| 4 | Giulia Martinelli | Italy | 10:12.08 | Q |
| 5 | Eleanor Fulton | United States | 10:25.89 | q |
| 6 | Sofie Gallein | Belgium | 10:33.09 | q |
| 7 | Azucena Rodríguez | Mexico | 10:35.58 | q |
| 8 | Athiná Koini | Greece | 10:38.33 | |
| 9 | Jovana de la Cruz | Peru | 10:42.52 | |
| 10 | Albina Chinchikeeva | Russia | 11:07.04 | |
| 11 | Nabila Draa | Algeria | 11:08.00 | |
| 12 | Zarina Mentayeva | Kazakhstan | 11:08.57 | |
| 13 | Elena Panaet | Romania | 11:09.82 | |

== Participation ==
According to an unofficial count, 26 athletes from 19 countries participated in the event.

- Algeria (2)
- Belgium (1)
- Canada (1)
- Chinese Taipei (1)
- Ethiopia (2)
- France (1)
- Germany (1)
- Greece (1)
- Israel (1)
- Italy (2)
- Kazakhstan (1)
- Kenya (2)
- Mexico (1)
- New Zealand (1)
- Peru (1)
- Romania (1)
- Russia (2)
- Spain (2)
- United States (2)
