= Lucie Sekanová =

Czech steeplechase runner

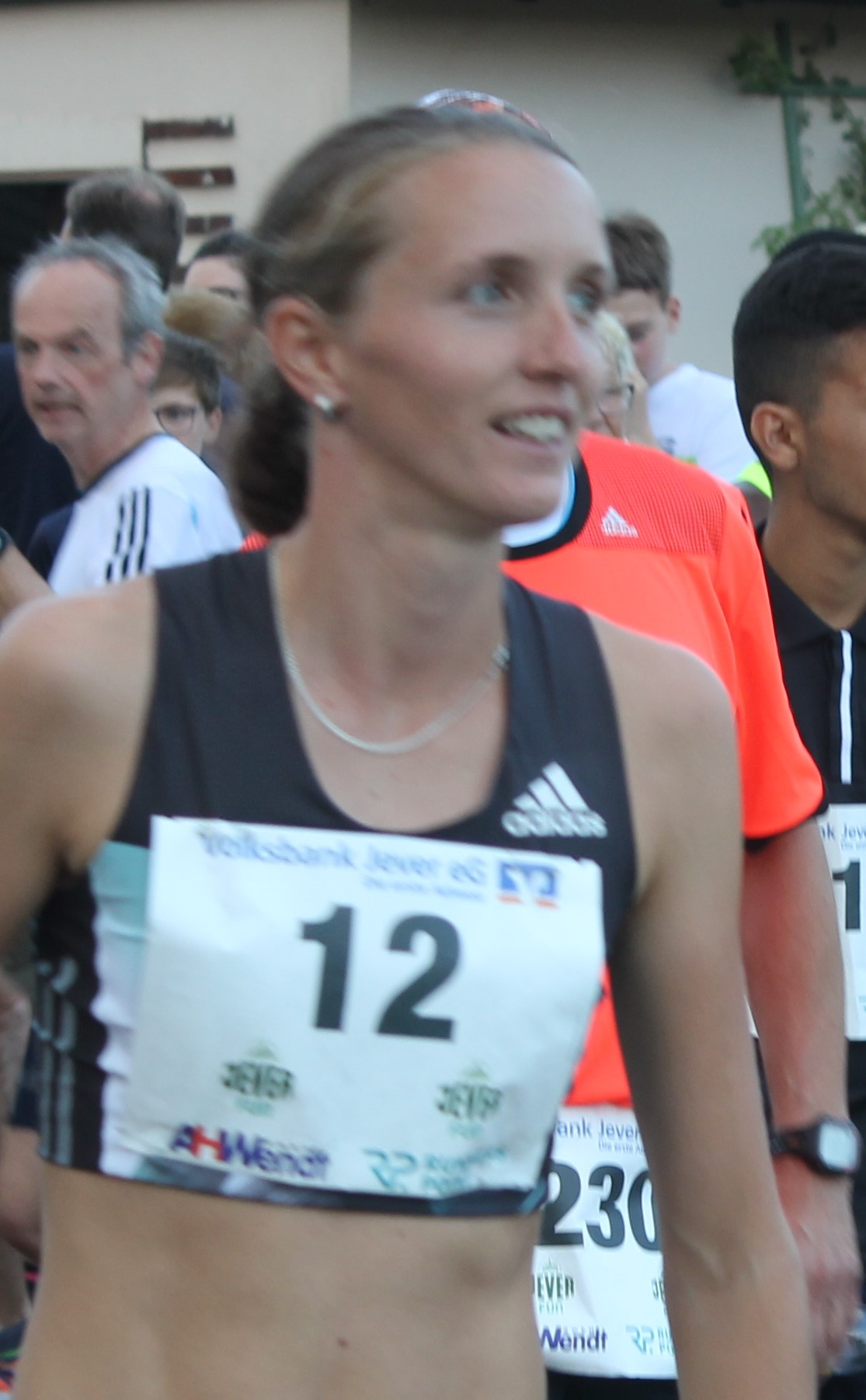
- Sekanová in 2016

Personal information
- Born: 5 August 1989 (age 36) Prachatice, Czechoslovakia
- Education: University of Economics and Management, Prague

Sport
- Country: Czech Republic
- Sport: Track and field
- Event: 3000 metres steeplechase
- Club: ACP Olymp Brno

Lucie Sekanová (born 5 August 1989) is a Czech long-distance runner competing primarily in the 3000 metres steeplechase. She represented her country at the 2015 World Championships in Beijing without qualifying for the final.

In 2017, she competed in the women's 3000 metres steeplechase event at the 2017 World Championships in Athletics held in London, United Kingdom. She did not advance to compete in the final.

== Competition record ==
Year	Competition	Venue	Position	Event	Notes
Representing the Czech Republic
2008	World Junior Championships	Bydgoszcz, Poland	8th	3000 m s'chase	10:16.31
2011	European U23 Championships	Ostrava, Czech Republic	10th	3000 m s'chase	10:07.61
2014	European Championships	Zurich, Switzerland	23rd	10,000 m	33:57.29
2015	World Championships	Beijing, China	27th (h)	3000 m s'chase	9:45.72
2016	European Championships	Amsterdam, Netherlands	25th (h)	3000 m s'chase	10:10.93
2017	World Championships	London, United Kingdom	37th (h)	3000 m s'chase	10:09.67
2017	Universiade	Taipei, Taiwan	8th	3000 m s'chase	10:19.38
2018	European Championships	Berlin, Germany	25th (h)	3000 m s'chase	9:50.38

== Personal bests ==
Outdoor

- 1500 metres – 4:17.15 (Ostrava 2015)
- 3000 metres – 9:11.90 (Herakleion 2015)
- 5000 metres – 15:43.94 (Huelva 2015)
- 10,000 metres – 33:22.90 (Jičín 2014)
- 10 kilometres – 33:43 (Berlin 2013)
- Half marathon – 1:17:39 (Prague 2014)
- 3000 metres steeplechase – 9:41.84 (Mersin 2015)

Indoor

- 1500 metres – 4:24.87 (Vienna 2009)
- 3000 metres – 9:22.65 (Prague 2017)
