= Rosie Clarke =

British athletics competitor

Rosie Bird (nee. Clarke)
Personal information
- Born: 17 November 1991 (age 34) Pembury, Kent, England
- Education: Caterham School; University of Bath; Iona College
- Height: 1.64 m (5 ft 5 in)
- Weight: 50 kg (110 lb)

Sport
- Sport: Athletics
- Event: 3000 m steeplechase
- Club: Epsom & Ewell
- Coached by: Michael Firth (–2013); Thomas Watson (2013–2015); David Harmer (2015–2019); Robert Denmark (2019-2021)

Rosie Bird (née. Clarke) (born 17 November 1991) is an English former runner who competed primarily in the 3000 metres steeplechase. She represented Great Britain at the 2017 World Championships without reaching the final.

Bird competed for the Iona Gaels track and field team in the NCAA.

She retired from competitive running in 2021.

== International competitions ==
Year	Competition	Venue	Position	Event	Notes
Representing Great Britain and England
2015	European Indoor Championships	Prague, Czech Republic	6th	1500 m	4:16.49
2016	European Championships	Amsterdam, Netherlands	23rd (h)	3000 m s'chase	10:00.25
2017	World Championships	London, United Kingdom	25th (h)	3000 m s'chase	9:49.36
2018	Commonwealth Games	Gold Coast, Australia	4th	3000 m s'chase	9:36.29
2018	European Championships	Berlin, Germany	10th	3000 m s'chase	9:32.15
2019	World Championships	Doha, Qatar	34th (h)	3000 m s'chase	9:49.18

== Personal bests ==
Outdoor

- 800 metres – 2:08.92 (Oxford 2013)
- 1500 metres – 4:12.10 (Charlottesville 2015)
- One mile – 4:54.38 (Oxford 2012)
- 3000 metres – 9:15.04 (Monaco 2016)
- 10 kilometres – 33:30 (Paris 2016)
- 2000 metres steeplechase – 6:29.53 (Parliament Hill 2016)
- 3000 metres steeplechase – 9:36.75 (Palo Alto 2017)

Indoor

- 800 metres – 2:08.31 (Birmingham 2013)
- 1500 metres – 4:16.49 (Prague 2015)
- One mile – 4:31.75 (Fayetteville 2015)
- 3000 metres – 9:10.99 (Sheffield 2014)
