= María José Pérez (runner) =

Spanish steeplechase runner

Personal information
- Born: 12 June 1992 (age 34) Carrión de Calatrava, Spain
- Height: 1.59 m (5 ft 3 in)
- Weight: 48 kg (106 lb)

Sport
- Sport: Athletics
- Event: 3000 m steeplechase
- Club: Valencia Club Atletismo
- Coached by: Antonio Serrano

María José Pérez Moreno (born 12 June 1992) is a Spanish runner competing primarily in the 3000 metres steeplechase. She represented her country at the 2017 World Championships without qualifying for the final.

== International competitions ==
| Year | Competition | Venue | Position | Event | Notes |
Representing Spain
| 2009 | World Youth Championships | Brixen, Italy | 16th (h) | 2000 m s'chase | 7:21.78 |
| 2010 | World Junior Championships | Moncton, Canada | 19th (h) | 3000 m s'chase | 10:50.36 |
| 2011 | European Junior Championships | Tallinn, Estonia | 6th | 3000 m s'chase | 10:38.17 |
| 2014 | Mediterranean U23 Championships | Aubagne, France | 2nd | 3000 m s'chase | 10:06:78 |
| 2017 | World Championships | London, United Kingdom | 35th (h) | 3000 m s'chase | 10:01.84 |
| 2018 | European Championships | Berlin, Germany | 20th (h) | 3000 m s'chase | 9:44.72 |
| 2018 | Ibero-American Championships | Trujillo, Peru | 2nd | 3000 m s'chase | 9:55.63 |
| 2025 | European Running Championships | Leuven, Belgium | 10th | Half marathon | 1:12:52 |

== Personal bests ==
Outdoor

- 1500 metres – 4:29.79 (Valencia 2017)
- 3000 metres – 9:34.57 (San Sebastián 2017)
- 5000 metres – 16:09.83 (Ciudad Real 2017)
- 10,000 metres – 33:43.21 (Huelva 2017)
- 3000 metres steeplechase – 9:40.51 (Paris 2017)

Indoor

- 3000 metres – 9:53.76 (Antequera 2012)
