= Irene Sánchez-Escribano =

Spanish athletics competitor

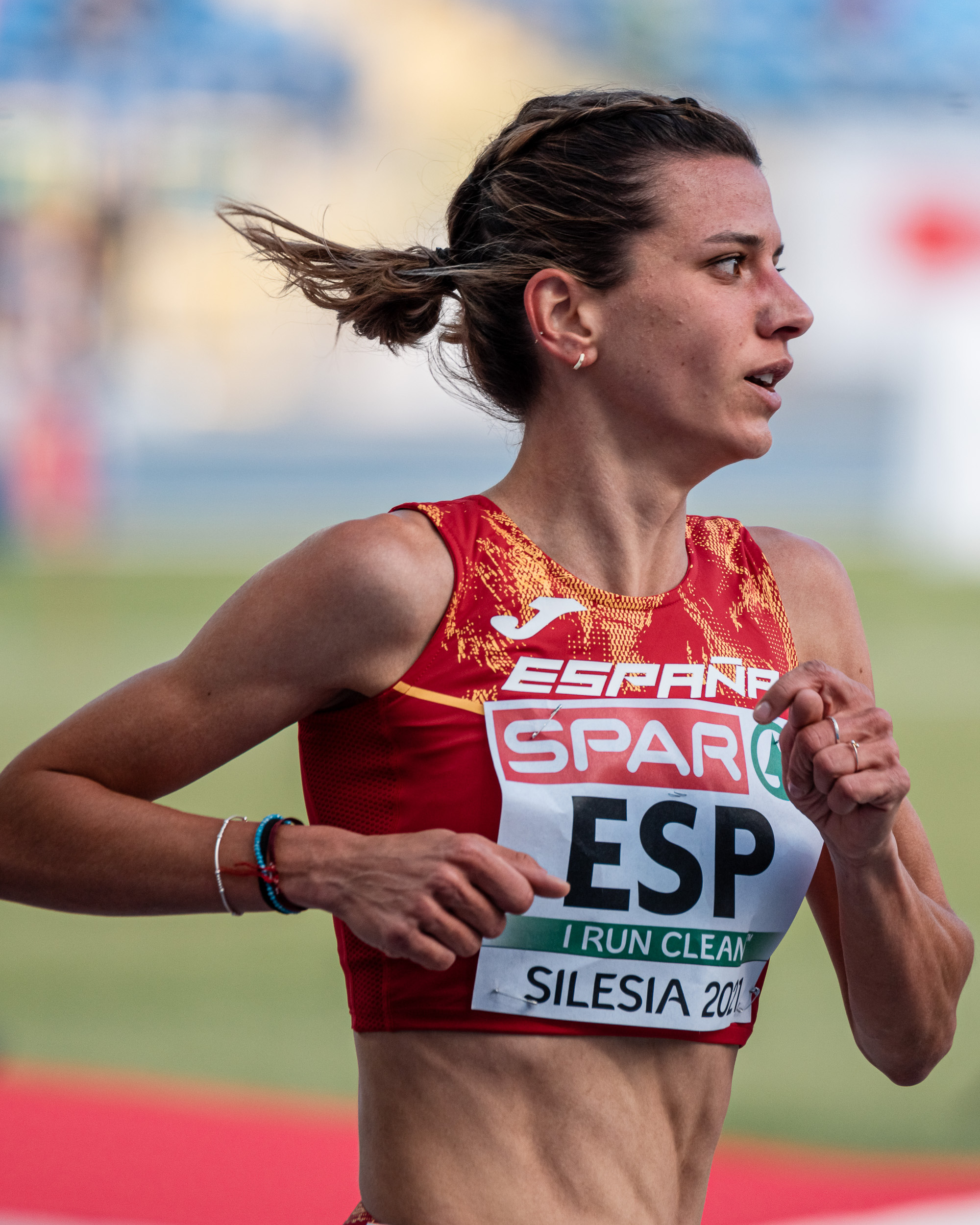
- Sánchez-Escribano at the 2021 European Team Championships

Personal information
- Full name: Irene Sánchez-Escribano Figueroa
- Born: 25 August 1992 (age 33) Toledo, Spain
- Height: 1.63 m (5 ft 4 in)
- Weight: 52 kg (115 lb)

Sport
- Sport: Athletics
- Event: 3000 m steeplechase
- Club: C. A. Adidas
- Coached by: Antonio Serrano

Irene Sánchez-Escribano Figueroa (born 25 August 1992 in Toledo) is a Spanish runner competing primarily in the 3000 metres steeplechase. She represented her country at the 2017 World Championships without reaching the final.

In 2019, she competed in the senior women's race at the 2019 IAAF World Cross Country Championships held in Aarhus, Denmark. She finished in 25th place.

== Personal bests ==
Outdoor

- 800 metres – 2:11.06 (Castellón 2012)
- 1500 metres – 4:17.55 (Madrid 2019)
- 3000 metres – 9:15.33 (Rovereto 2018)
- 5000 metres – 15:33:29 (Los Corrales de Buelna 2021)
- 10 kilometres – 31:35 (Laredo 2024)
- 2000 metres steeplechase – 6:13.03 (Pontoise 2020)
- 3000 metres steeplechase – 9:10.43 (Paris 2024)

Indoor

- 1500 metres – 4:24.63 (Madrid 2017)
- 3000 metres – 9:13.82 (Valencia 2017)

== International competitions ==
Representing Spain
Year	Competition	Venue	Position	Event	Result	Notes
2014	Mediterranean U23 Championships	Aubagne, France	6th	3000 m s'chase	10:30.33	
2016	European Championships	Amsterdam, Netherlands	24th (h)	3000 m s'chase	10:08.12	
2016	European Cross Country Championships	Chia, Italy	50th	7.97 km XC	27:29	
2017	European Team Championships Super League	Lille, France	3rd	3000 m s'chase	9:43.51	
2017	World Championships	London, United Kingdom	22nd (h)	3000 m s'chase	9:46.59	
2018	Mediterranean Games	Tarragona, Spain	4th	3000 m s'chase	9:37.86	
2018	European Championships	Berlin, Germany	8th	3000 m s'chase	9:34.69	
2019	World Cross Country Championships	Aarhus, Denmark	25th	10 km XC	38:44	
2019	European Team Championships Super League	Bydgoszcz, Poland	2nd	3000 m s'chase	9:39.24	
2019	World Championships	Doha, Qatar	20th (h)	3000 m s'chase	9:37.34	
2019	European Cross Country Championships	Lisbon, Portugal	16th	8.3 km XC	28:50	
2021	European Team Championships Super League	Chorzów, Poland	3rd	3000 m s'chase	9:41.44	
2022	Ibero-American Championships	La Nucía, Spain	2nd	3000 m s'chase	9:37.08	
2022	World Championships	Eugene, United States	21st (h)	3000 m s'chase	9:23.94	
2022	European Championships	Munich, Germany	10th	3000 m s'chase	9:37.84	
2023	World Cross Country Championships	Bathurst, Australia	30th	10 km XC	36:20	
2023	World Championships	Budapest, Hungary	25th (h)	3000 m s'chase	9:31.97	
2023	European Cross Country Championships	Brussels, Belgium	8th	8 km XC	35:32	
2024	World Cross Country Championships	Belgrade, Serbia	26th	10 km XC	33:55	
2024	European Championships	Rome, Italy	10th	3000 m s'chase	9:27.97	
2024	Olympic Games	Paris, France	11th	3000 m s'chase	9:10.43	
