= Fabienne Schlumpf =

Swiss steeplechase runner

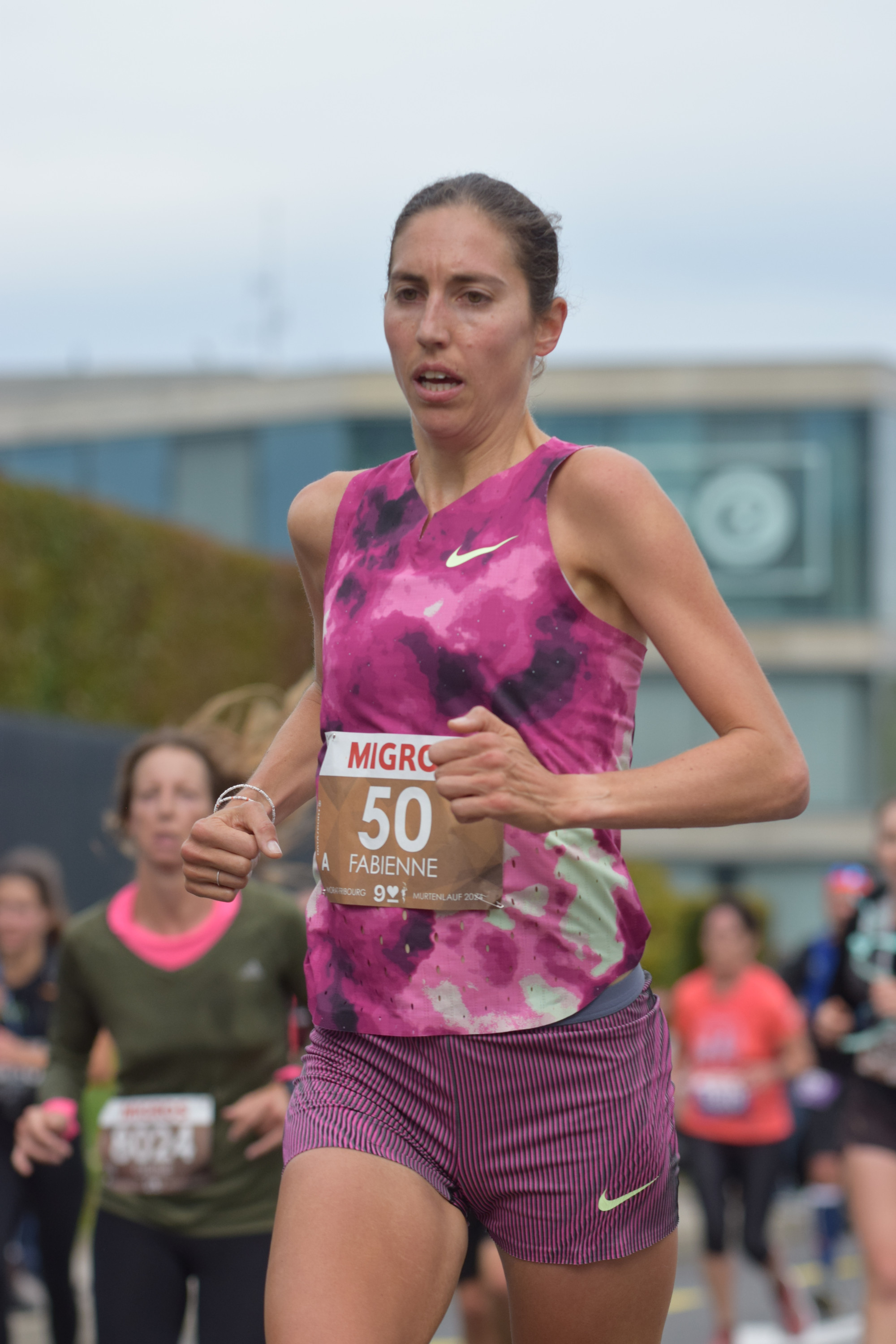
- Schlumpf in 2024

Personal information
- Born: 17 November 1990 (age 35)
- Height: 1.83 m (6 ft 0 in)
- Weight: 62 kg (137 lb)

Sport
- Sport: Athletics
- Events: 3000 m steeplechase; marathon
- Club: TG Hütten
Medal record
European Championships
Silver medal – second place	2018 Berlin	3000 m steeplechase

Fabienne Schlumpf (born 17 November 1990) is a Swiss athlete specialising in the 3000 metres steeplechase, and later, marathon running. She won the silver medal at the 2018 European Championships. In 2020, she competed in the women's half marathon at the 2020 World Athletics Half Marathon Championships held in Gdynia, Poland.

Her personal best of 9:37.81 is the former national record, since beaten by Chiara Scherrer in 2022.

She used the competition-free time during the COVID-19 pandemic to re-orient towards marathon running. In her first marathon race ever (Belp, April 3, 2021) she not only fulfilled the time cutoff to participate at the 2020 Olympics in Tokyo, but with 2:26:14 hours she improved the Swiss record for female marathon runners.

Schlumpf ran her second marathon race at the Olympic Games in Tokyo and was placed 12th with 2:31:36 hours.

== International competitions ==
Year	Competition	Venue	Position	Event	Notes
Representing Switzerland
2009	European Junior Championships	Novi Sad, Serbia	20th (h)	3000 m s'chase	11:19.84
2011	European U23 Championships	Ostrava, Czech Republic	17th (h)	3000 m s'chase	10:31.10
2013	World Championships	Moscow, Russia	–	3000 m s'chase	DQ
2014	European Championships	Zürich, Switzerland	13th	3000 m s'chase	9:55.92
2016	European Championships	Amsterdam, Netherlands	5th	3000 m s'chase	9:40.01
2016	Olympic Games	Rio de Janeiro, Brazil	18th	3000 m s'chase	9:59.30
2017	World Championships	London, United Kingdom	13th (h)	3000 m s'chase	9:36.08
2018	European Championships	Berlin, Germany	2nd	3000 m s'chase	9:22.29
2021	Olympic Games	Sapporo, Japan	12th	Marathon	2:31:36
2022	European Championships	Munich, Germany	9th	Marathon	2:30:17
2026	European Championships	Birmingham, United Kingdom	19th	Marathon	2:32:11

== Personal bests ==
Outdoor

- 800 metres – 2:12.80 (Bern 2010)
- 1500 metres – 4:22.89 (Frauenfeld 2014)
- 3000 metres – 9:14.89 (Riga 2014)
- 5000 metres – 15:51.06 (Riga 2014)
- 3000 metres steeplechase – 9:21.65(Oslo 2017)
- 10 kilometres – 33:00 (Uster 2015)
- 15 kilometres – 54:57 (Port Elizabeth 2015)
- Half marathon – 1:13:56 (The Hague 2015)
- Marathon 2:24:30 (Valencia 2023) NR

Indoor

- 3000 metres – 9:34.44 (St. Gallen 2016)
