= Kerry O'Flaherty =

Irish athlete

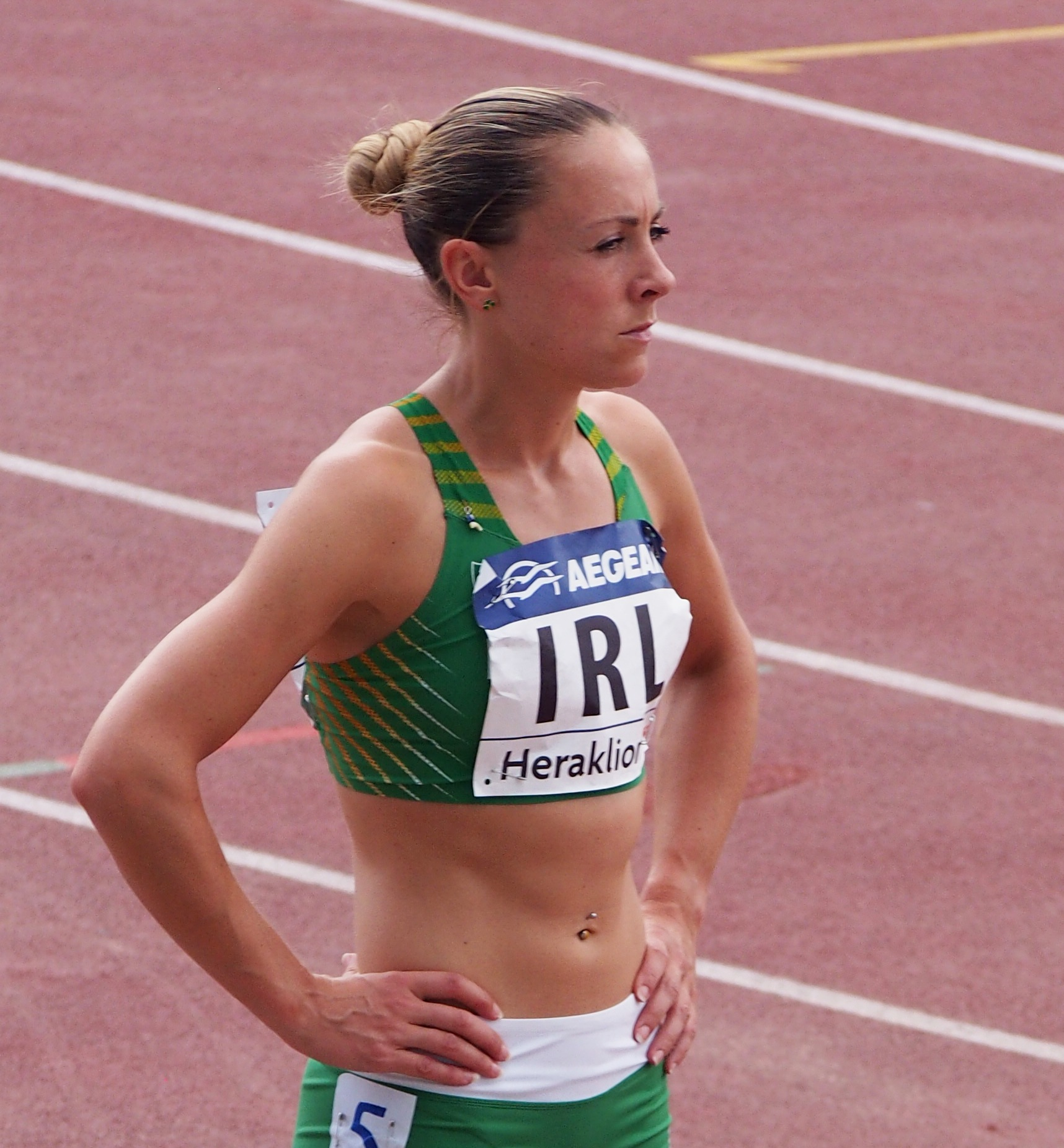
- Kerry O'Flaherty at 2015 European Team Championships First League.

Personal information
- Born: 15 July 1981 (age 45) Newtownards, Northern Ireland
- Height: 1.67 m (5 ft 5 1/2 in)
- Weight: 53 kg (117 lb)

Sport
- Country: Ireland
- Sport: Track and field
- Event: 3000 metres steeplechase
- Coached by: Richard Rodgers

Kerry O'Flaherty (born 15 July 1981) is an Irish runner competing primarily in the 3000 metres steeplechase. She competed at the 2015 World Championships in Beijing without qualifying for the final. O'Flaherty competed in the 2016 Olympic Games. She has also competed at two European Championships and one European Indoor Championships.

== Biography ==
Kerry O'Flaherty was born 15 July 1981 in Newtownards. She runs for Newcastle AC.

O'Flaherty completed a sports science degree and studied physical education at Ulster University.

She began competitively training in 2009. She had hoped to qualify for the 2012 Summer Olympics in London but was plagued by an Achilles injury.

She improved on her Northern Ireland 3000m steeplechase record at the 2014 International Flanders Athletics Meeting in Oordegem with a time of 9:52.94, finishing fifth. She was injured at the same event the previous year and missed most of the season due to a faulty water barrier. Her time qualified her for the 2014 Commonwealth Games in Glasgow.

She qualified for the 2015 World Championships and the 2016 Summer Olympics after running a 9:42.61 at the 2015 Letterkenny AC International. She beat her personal best time by ten seconds. O'Flaherty competed in the third heat of the World Championships and finished with a time of 10:05.10. She was disappointed by her finish and did not qualify for the finals.

In the 2016 European Championships, she finished in sixth place, behind her teammate Sara Treacy, and achieved a personal best time of 9:45.53, advancing to the finals. All three Irish athletes advanced to the finals, the first time ever in any event at the European Championships. She finished in 12th place with 9:45.88. She was also part of the bronze-medal winning Irish team that raced at the 2016 European Cross Country Championships.

O'Flaherty competed in her first Olympics, the 2016 Games in Rio, at the age of 35. She finished the 3000m steeplechase with a time of 9:45.35, placing 14th in the heat. It was her season best, but she did not advance to the finals.

She competed in the 3000m steeplechase at the 2018 European Championships, but did not qualify for the finals after finishing her heat in 10:09.81 and 17th place.

O'Flaherty worked on qualifying for Northern Ireland's 2018 Commonwealth Games team, which had a qualification standard of 9:54.00. She tore her calf muscle in May 2017. O'Flaherty finished a June 2017 race at Huelva in 10:06.86 in 11th. At the 2017 Folksam Grand Prix she narrowly missed, finishing in 9:54.40. She successfully met the qualification time at a race four days later in the Memorial Rasschaert. However, since she only met the qualification time once, she was ranked 13th of Northern Ireland's 15 qualified athletes. The team was allocated 11 spots so O'Flaherty was not selected to represent Northern Ireland at the 2018 Commonwealth Games.

She qualified for the 2018 European Athletics Championships during the IFAM Flanders International. She placed third with 9:53.00, qualifying under the B standard.

In 2019 O'Flaherty was working to qualify for the World Championships. During the European Permit Meeting in Spain, she was hit from behind as she attempted to jump a barrier. When she landed, she broke her fifth metatarsal, ending her hopes to qualify for the World Championships.

== Statistics ==
=== Personal bests ===
Event	Time	Venue	Date	Notes
1500 metres (indoor)	4:14.63	Athlone 2017	15 February 2017	
1500 metres (outdoor)	4:12.79	Leixlip 2015	13 June 2015	
3000 metres (indoor)	9:11.77	Athlone 2016	27 February 2016	
3000 metres (outdoor)	9:09.50	Banská Bystrica 2009	20 June 2009	
3000 metres steeplechase	9:42.61	Letterkenny 2015	10 July 2015	

=== Competition record ===
Year	Competition	Venue	Position	Event	Notes
Representing Ireland and Northern Ireland
2014	Commonwealth Games	Glasgow, United Kingdom	11th	3000 m s'chase	9:55.94
2015	World Championships	Beijing, China	39th (h)	3000 m s'chase	10:05.10
2016	European Championships	Amsterdam, Netherlands	12th	3000 m s'chase	9:45.88
2016	Olympic Games	Rio de Janeiro, Brazil	34th (h)	3000 m s'chase	9:45.35
2017	European Indoor Championships	Belgrade, Serbia	18th (h)	1500 m	4:23.82
2018	European Championships	Berlin, Germany	32nd (h)	3000 m s'chase	10:09.81
