= Jana Sussmann =

German long-distance runner

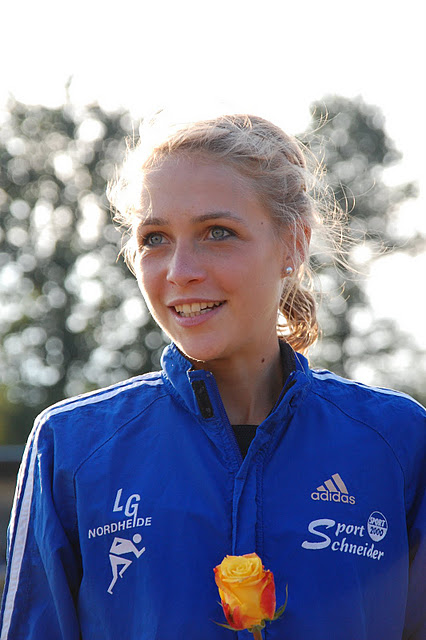

Jana Sussmann (born 12 October 1990) is a German long-distance runner who specializes in the 3000 metres steeplechase.

She finished seventh in the 1500 metres at the 2008 World Junior Championships and won the silver medal in the 3000 metres steeplechase at the 2011 European U23 Championships.

She also competed at the 2011 World Championships, the 2014 European Championships and the 2016 European Championships, all in the steeplechase, without reaching the final.

Her personal best time is 9:39.46 minutes, achieved in August 2017 in Berlin. In the same year she also achieved personal best times in the 5 and 10 kilometres road running.
