= Aleksandra Lisowska (runner) =

Polish long-distance runner

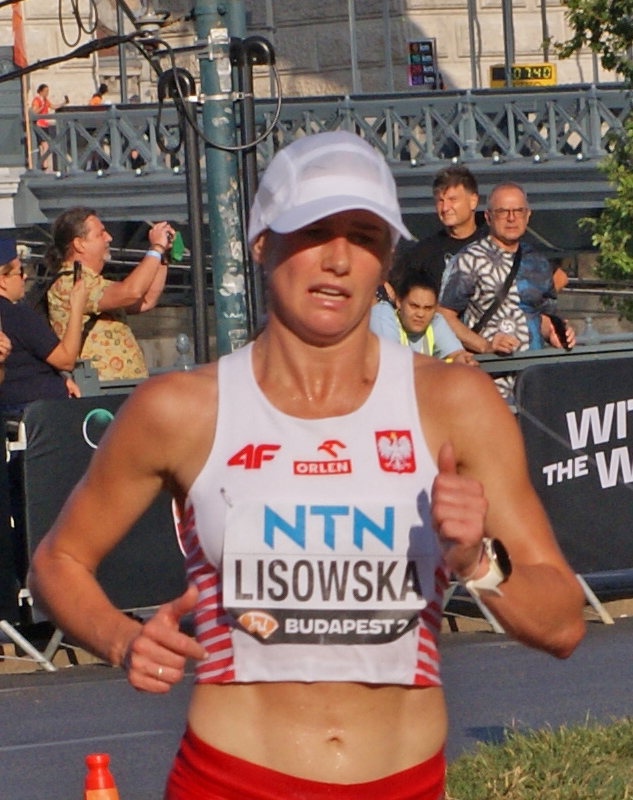

Personal information
- Born: 12 December 1990 (age 35) Braniewo, Poland

Sport
- Country: Poland
- Sport: Track and field
- Event: Long-distance running
- Club: AZS UWM Olsztyn (2011–); Zatoka Braniewo (–2010)
- Coached by: Jacek Wosiek
Medal record
Women's athletics
Representing Poland
European Championships
Gold medal – first place	2022 Munich	Marathon

Aleksandra Lisowska (born 12 December 1990) is a Polish long-distance runner. She won the gold medal in the marathon at the 2022 European Athletics Championships.

Lisowska is a five-time Polish national champion.

== Career ==
In 2011, she competed in the women's 3000 m steeplechase event at the European Athletics U23 Championships held in Ostrava, Czech Republic.

Lisowska competed in the women's half marathon at the 2020 World Athletics Half Marathon Championships in Gdynia, Poland, finishing 51st.

In 2021, she represented Poland in the women's marathon at the delayed 2020 Tokyo Olympics, coming home 35th in a time of 2:35:33.

A year later, Lisowska improved her mark from Tokyo by almost seven minutes in claiming the gold medal at the European Athletics Championships held in Munich with a season's best of 2:28:36. Thus, she became only the second Polish female athlete after Wanda Panfil in 1991 to win a major championship title in the women's marathon. Her Munich result would have placed her fourth in Tokyo. Lisowska added bronze in the team category, and led the Polish team to bronze also at the World Military Cross Country Championships in Beja, Portugal in October.

== International competitions ==
Representing Poland
Year	Competition	Venue	Position	Event	Result
2011	European U23 Championships	Ostrava, Czech Republic	19th (h)	3000 m st.	10:34.06
2012	World University Cross Country Championships	Łódź, Poland	20th	Women's race	16:51
2012	World University Cross Country Championships	Łódź, Poland	3rd	Women's team	45 pts
2019	Military World Games	Wuhan, China	6th	Marathon	2:31:40
2019	Military World Games	Wuhan, China	2nd	Marathon team	7:35:15
2020	World Half Marathon Championships	Gdynia, Poland	51st	Half marathon	1:12:16 PB
2021	Olympic Games	Tokyo, Japan	35th	Marathon	2:35:33
2022	European Championships	Munich, Germany	1st	Marathon	2:28:36 SB
2022	European Championships	Munich, Germany	3rd	Marathon team	7:40:54
2022	World Military Cross Country Championships	Beja, Portugal	10th	Women's XC	29:30
2022	World Military Cross Country Championships	Beja, Portugal	3rd	Women's team	(10,15,16,19)
2023	World Championships	Budapest, Hungary	–	Marathon	DNF
2026	European Championships	Birmingham, United Kingdom	13th	Marathon	2:30:21

== Personal bests ==
- 5000 metres – 16:06.90 (Toruń 2020)
- 10,000 metres – 32:55.09 (Międzyrzecz 2022)

Road

- 10 kilometres – 33:05 (Poznań 2020)
- Half marathon – 1:12:16 (Gdynia 2020)
- Marathon – 2:26:08 (Dębno 2021)
