= Adva Cohen =

Israeli runner (born 1996)

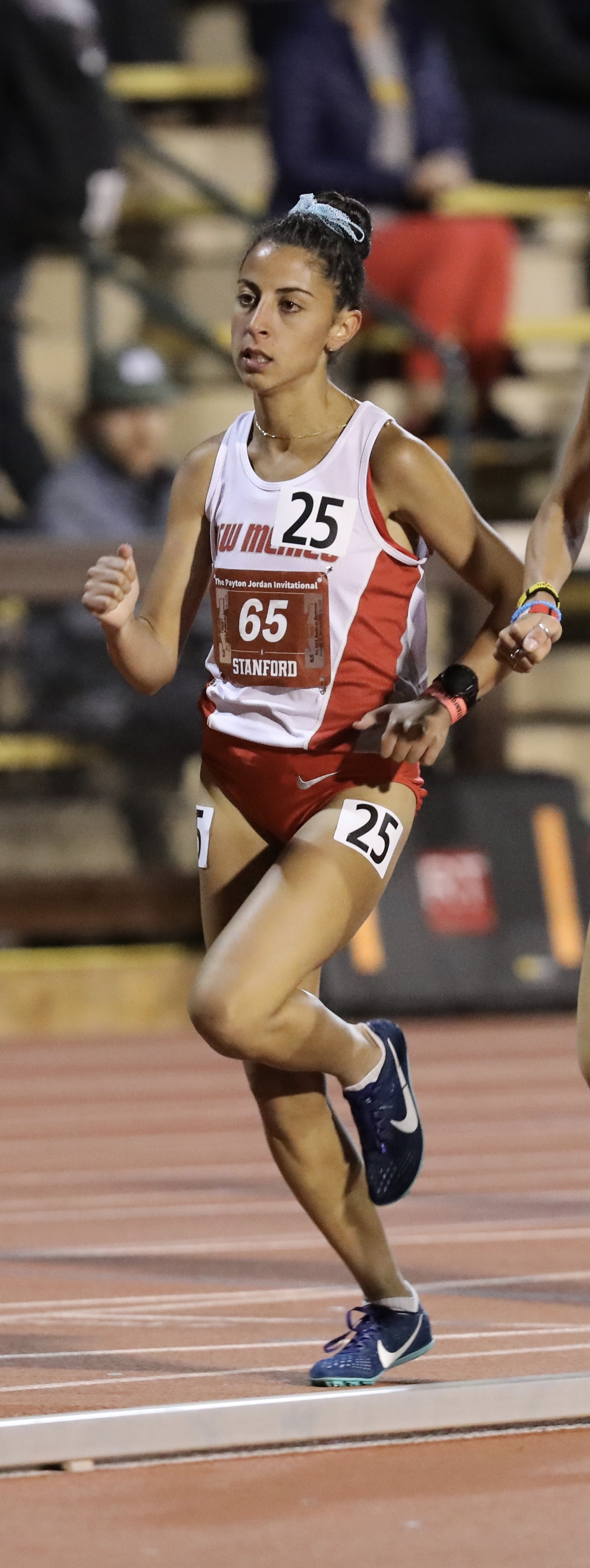
- Adva Cohen in 2019

Personal information
- Native name: אדוה כהן
- National team: Israel
- Born: March 24, 1996 (age 30) Jerusalem, Israel

Sport
- Sport: Running
- College team: Iowa Central Community College and University of New Mexico

Adva Cohen (Hebrew: אדוה כהן; born March 24, 1996) is an Israeli runner. As of 2019 she held the Israeli national records in the indoor mile, 3000 metres, and 5000 metres, and outdoor under-23 3000 metres steeplechase, 5000 metres, and half marathon.

== Biography ==
Adva Cohen was born in Jerusalem, Israel. Her mother, Rika, also runs. Cohen is the youngest of three children. She attended high school at Ort Ramot. She spent two years serving in the Israel Defense Forces.

== Running career ==
Cohen's first running coach was Roman Ferdman.

Cohen won the Israeli national championships in the 1500 metres with 4:24.49 in Tel Aviv, Israel, in 2017. That year she was named the Israel Athletic Association's National Track and Field Breakthrough Athlete of the Year.

She spent her freshman year of college in junior college at Iowa Central Community College, where she won nine individual NJCAA titles during the 2017–18 season. She established NJCAA records in the mile (4:42.44), the 3000 m (9:29.04), and the 5000 m (16:16.50). She was the 2017 NJCAA Cross Country individual champion, the 2017 Half Marathon individual champion, the 2017 U.S. Track & Field and Cross Country Coaches Association National Women's Athlete of the Year, the 2017 USTFCCCA Midwest Region Athlete of the Year, an NJCAA and a Coaches Association All-American in both the NJCAA Cross Country Championships and the Half Marathon, and set a new Israeli national record with her Half Marathon time of 1:20:25.

Cohen then transferred to the University of New Mexico as a sophomore, to compete with the New Mexico Lobos. She is majoring in computer science.

Cohen came in fifth in the 2018 European Athletics Championships in the 3000 metres with 9:29.74 in Berlin, Germany, in 2018. She became the sixth college student to break the 9:30 time barrier, and her time ranked her 22nd in the world and met 2020 Olympics qualifying standards.

In 2019, she came in second in the New Mexico Classic in the 800 metres indoor in Albuquerque, New Mexico, with a time of 2:10.10. Cohen also came in third in the Mountain West Outdoor Track & Field Championship in Clovis, California, in the 1500 metres with a time of 4:22.88, and then came in third at the 2019 European Athletics Team Championships Second League, Varazdin, with a time of 4:20.96. She won the New Mexico Classic in Albuquerque in the mile with a time of 4:45.98, and came in second in the New Mexico Team Invitational in Albuquerque in the mile with a time of 4:47.90. She came in second in the Bryan Clay Invitational in Azusa, California in the 5000 metres with a time of 15:31.01. She won the 2000 metres steeplechase at the Don Kirby Tailwind Open in Albuquerque with a time of 6:36.41. She won the 3000 metres steeplechase at the Israel Jump Meet in Jerusalem, Israel, with a time of 10:00.11, and came in second in it at both the Payton Jordan Invitational in Palo Alto, California, with a time of 9:45.71, and the NCAA West Preliminary Round in Sacramento, California, with a time of 9:44.41.

As of May 2019 she held the Israeli national records in the indoor mile, 3K, and 5K, outdoor under-23 3,000-meter steeplechase, 5,000 meters, and half marathon.

== See also ==
- List of Israeli records in athletics
- Sports in Israel
- Women in Israel
