= Michelle Finn (steeplechaser) =

Irish steeplechase runner

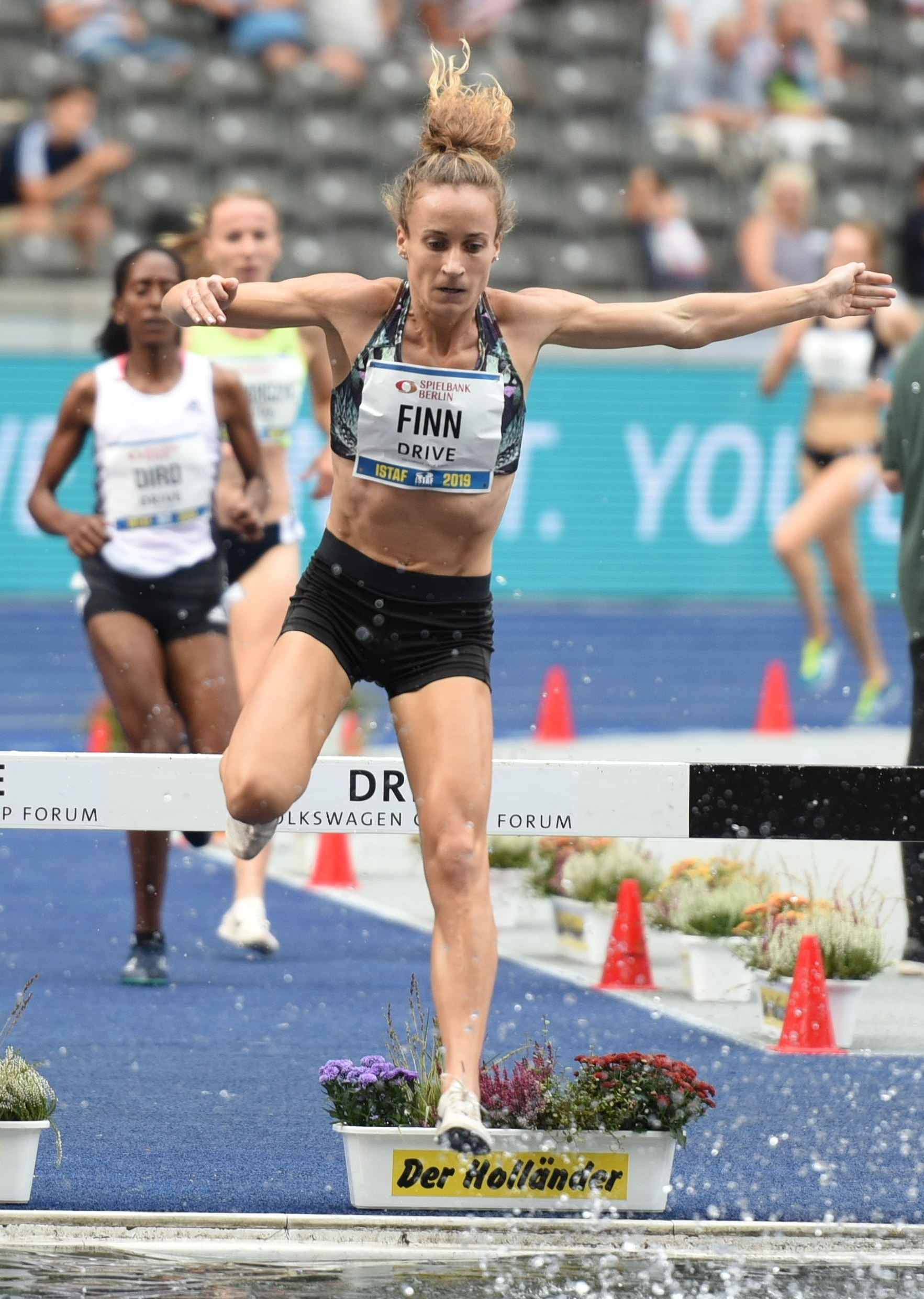
- Finn in 2019

Personal information
- Born: 16 December 1989 (age 36)
- Education: Western Kentucky University; University of Limerick

Sport
- Country: Ireland
- Sport: Athletics
- Updated on 29 August 2015

Michelle Finn (born 16 December 1989) is an Irish runner competing in the 3000 metres steeplechase. She represented Ireland in the 3,000 metres steeplechase at the 2016 Summer Olympics in Rio; she finished 11th in her heat. Previously she had also represented Ireland at the 2015 World Championships.

== Biography ==
Finn grew up in Castlemagner. She was born 16 December 1989 to Mary and Toddy Finn.

Finn was a four-year scholarship athlete for Western Kentucky University, majoring in communications. She received a master's degree in nutrition. She also spent two years at the University of Limerick.

Finn placed second at the GloHealth Cross-country Championships which qualified her to compete for Ireland in the 2014 European Cross Country Championships held in Bulgaria. The team won a bronze medal and she placed 23rd in the event.

She qualified for the 2015 World Championships and the 2016 Summer Olympics after running a 9:43.34 at the 2015 Letterkenny AC International. Finn finished the 2015 World Championships 3000m steeplechase in 9:55.27 for ninth in her heat. She did not advance to the finals.

Finn ran the 3000m steeplechase at the 2016 Summer Olympics in Rio. She passed three competitors during the final stretch to come in 11th with a time of 9:49.45. She had the 39th fastest time in the heats and did not advance to the finals.

In February 2018, Finn suffered a stress fracture in her foot and had to modify her training schedule to accommodate it. To qualify for the European Championships, Finn needed to run under 9:55 in two qualifying events. On 18 July she finished a race in France with 9:51.43, leaving one more time to qualify for the European Championships. On the first water jump in a race on 25 July Finn landed awkwardly and sprained her ankle. She considered dropping out of the race but pressed on and finished in 9:56.03, just over the time required for the B qualification standard. With her last chance to qualify four days later and with her doctor's approval, she raced at the Irish Athletics Championships, finishing with a time of 9:46.19. In the 2018 European Championships she finished 16th in her heat with a time of 10:10.93.

She qualified for the 2019 World Championships in Qatar. She finished ninth in her heat with a time of 9:47.44, saying that her time was affected by misjudging the first barrier. In July 2019, Finn set a PB of 9:41.23 during a race in Finland. Finn won the Sydney Track Classic and set a new personal best time of 9:38.04. Finn, who joined the Melbourne Track Club in January 2020, is training for the Tokyo 2020 Summer Olympics.

== Competition record ==
Year	Competition	Venue	Position	Event	Notes
Representing Ireland
2013	Universiade	Kazan, Russia	7th	3000 m s'chase	10:03.28
2015	World Championships	Beijing, China	33rd (h)	3000 m s'chase	9:55.27
2016	Olympic Games	Rio de Janeiro, Brazil	39th (h)	3000 m s'chase	9:49.45
2017	Universiade	Taipei, Taiwan	14th	3000 m s'chase	10:40.06
2019	World Championships	Doha, Qatar	30th (h)	3000 m s'chase	9:47.44
2021	European Indoor Championships	Toruń, Poland	16th (h)	3000 m	9:05.44
2021	Olympic Games	Tokyo, Japan	27th (h)	3000 m s'chase	9:36.26
2022	European Championships	Munich, Germany	14th	3000 m s'chase	9:47.57
2024	European Championships	Rome, Italy	24th (h)	3000 m s'chase	9:46.93
