= Mariya Shatalova =

Ukrainian middle-distance runner

Mariya Shatalova Mariia Shatalova
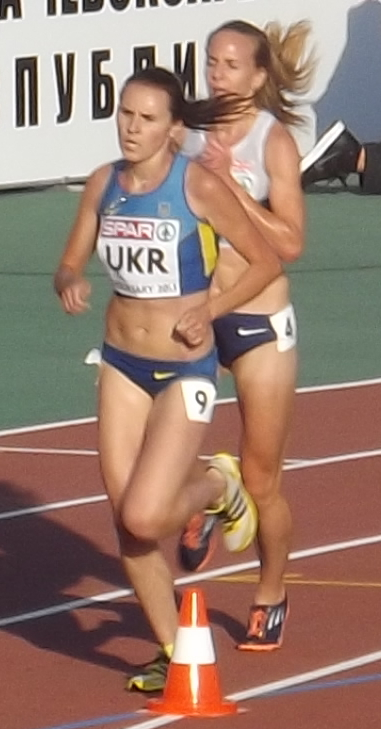
- Mariya Shatalova in 2015

Personal information
- Born: 1 March 1989 (age 36)
- Height: 1.69 m (5 ft 6 1/2 in)
- Weight: 56 kg (123 lb)

Sport
- Country: Ukraine
- Sport: Track and field
- Event: 3000 metres steeplechase

Mariya Shatalova or Mariia Shatalova (Ukrainian: Марія Шаталова; born 1 March 1989) is a Ukrainian middle-distance runner. She competed in the 3000 metres steeplechase event at the 2015 World Championships in Athletics in Beijing, China. In 2017, she competed in the women's 3000 metres steeplechase event at the 2017 World Championships in Athletics held in London, United Kingdom. She did not advance to compete in the final.
