= Nastassia Puzakova =

Belarusian steeplechase runner

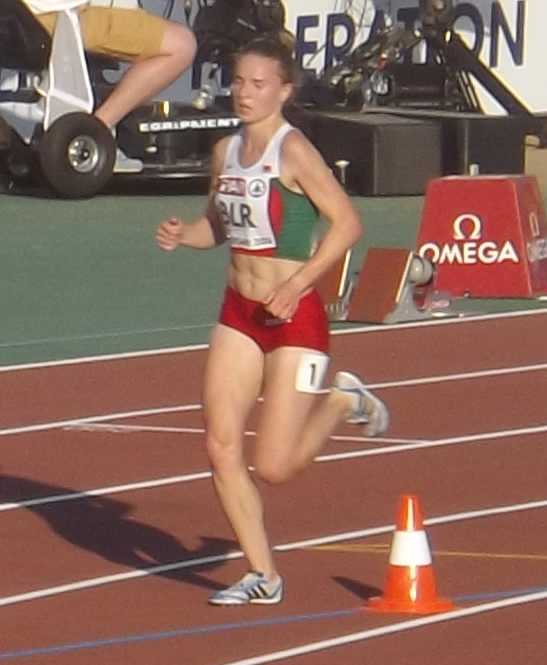
Nastassia Puzakova at the 2015 European Team Championships Super League

Nastassia Puzakova (born 12 December 1993) is a Belarusian steeplechase runner. She competed at the 2016 Summer Olympics in the women's 3000 metres steeplechase race; her time of 10:14.08 in the heats did not qualify her for the final.
