= Francesca Bertoni =

Italian steeplechase runner

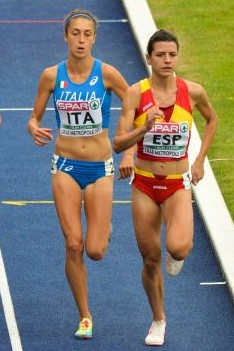
- Francesca Bertoni (left) at 2017 European Team Championships

Personal information
- Nationality: Italian
- Born: 29 December 1993 (age 32) Pavullo nel Frignano
- Height: 1.79 m (5 ft 10 1/2 in)
- Weight: 65 kg (143 lb)

Sport
- Country: Italy
- Sport: Athletics
- Event: 3000 metres steeplechase

Achievements and titles
- Personal best: 3000m steeplechase: 9:43.80 (2017)

Francesca Bertoni (born 29 December 1993) is an Italian female 3000 metres steeplechaseer.

== Biography ==
She was 4th in 3000m steeplechase race, with her personal best 9:43.80 at 2017 European Team Championships Super League.

== Achievements ==
Year	Competition	Venue	Position	Event	Time	Notes
2017	European Team Championships	(France) Lille	4th	3000 metres steeplechase	9:43.80	

== National titles ==
- Italian Athletics Championships
  - 3000 m steeplechase: 2016, 2017

== See also ==
- Italian all-time lists - 3000 metres steeplechase
