= Özlem Kaya (athlete) =

Turkish middle-distance runner

Personal information
- Nationality: Turkey
- Born: 20 April 1990 (age 36) Ardahan, Turkey
- Height: 165 cm (5 ft 5 in)
- Weight: 49 kg (108 lb)

Sport
- Sport: Middle-distance running
- Club: Üsküdar Belediye Sports Club, Istanbul
- Coached by: Aytaç Özbakır

Achievements and titles
- Personal best: 9:38,32 3000m sc (2012)
Medal record
Women's athletics
Representing Turkey
European Championships
Bronze medal – third place	2016 Amsterdam	3000m steeplechase
European Team Championships
Bronze medal – third place	2017 Lille	3000 m
Summer Universiade
Bronze medal – third place	2015 Gwangju	3000 m steeplechase

Özlem Kaya (pronounced [ˈœzlæm kaˈja]; born 20 April 1990 in Ardahan, Turkey) is a Turkish middle-distance runner. The 165 cm (5 ft 5 in) tall athlete at 49 kg (108 lb) is a member of Üsküdar Belediye Sports Club in Istanbul, where she is coached by Aytaç Özbakır.

Kaya participated in the 3000 m steeplechase event at the 2012 Olympics and 2016 Olympics. In 2017, she competed in the women's 3000 metres steeplechase event at the 2017 World Championships in Athletics held in London, United Kingdom. She did not advance to compete in the final.

== Personal best ==
- 9:30,23 3000m steeplechase - 24 August 2015, Beijing, China (2015 World Championships)
