= Athletics at the 2010 Asian Games – Women's 3000 metres steeplechase =

Women's 3000 metres steeplechase at the 2010 Asian Games
- Venue: Aoti Main Stadium
- Date: 21 November 2010
- Competitors: 6 from 4 nations

Medalists
gold medal	Sudha Singh	India
silver medal	Jin Yuan	China
bronze medal	Minori Hayakari	Japan

The women's 3000 metres steeplechase event at the 2010 Asian Games was held at the Aoti Main Stadium, Guangzhou, China on 21 November 2010.

== Schedule ==
All times are China Standard Time (UTC+08:00)

Date	Time	Event
Sunday, 21 November 2010	20:05	Final

== Records ==
Prior to this competition, the existing world, Asian and Games records were as follows.

World Record	Gulnara Samitova-Galkina (RUS)	8:58.81	Beijing, China	17 August 2008
Asian Record	Liu Nian (CHN)	9:26.25	Wuhan, China	2 November 2007
Games Record	—	—	—	—

== Results ==
Rank	Athlete	Time	Notes
1st place, gold medalist(s)	Sudha Singh (IND)	9:55.67	GR
2nd place, silver medalist(s)	Jin Yuan (CHN)	9:55.71	
3rd place, bronze medalist(s)	Minori Hayakari (JPN)	10:01.25	
4	Kareema Saleh Jasim (BRN)	10:05.60	
5	O. P. Jaisha (IND)	10:18.97	
6	Aster Tesfaye (BRN)	11:00.64	
