= Athletics at the 2011 Summer Universiade – Women's 3000 metres steeplechase =

The women's 3000 metres steeplechase event at the 2011 Summer Universiade was held on 17–19 August.

== Medalists ==
Gold	Silver	Bronze
Binnaz Uslu; Turkey	Lyudmila Kuzmina; Russia	Jin Yuan; China

== Results ==
=== Heats ===
Qualification: First 4 in each heat (Q) and the next 4 fastest (q) qualified for the final.

Rank	Heat	Name	Nationality	Time	Notes
1	2	Binnaz Uslu	Turkey	9:47.29	Q
2	2	Sabine Heitling	Brazil	9:50.04	Q, SB
3	2	Jin Yuan	China	9:51.63	Q, SB
4	2	Giulia Martinelli	Italy	9:52.92	Q
5	1	Lyudmila Kuzmina	Russia	9:54.91	Q
6	1	Li Zhenzhu	China	9:56.49	Q
7	2	Eleanor Waite	Great Britain	9:56.87	q
8	1	Eva Krchová	Czech Republic	9:57.37	Q
9	1	Gülcan Mıngır	Turkey	9:59.63	Q
10	2	Nolene Conrad	South Africa	9:59.89	q, PB
11	2	Geneviève Lalonde	Canada	10:00.29	q
12	1	Selien de Schrijder	Belgium	10:03.48	q
13	2	Justyna Korytkowska	Poland	10:03.59	
14	1	Valentina Costanza	Italy	10:05.34	
15	2	Janica Makela	Finland	10:05.76	
16	1	Matylda Szlęzak	Poland	10:11.79	
17	1	Chantelle Groenewoud	Canada	10:36.40	
18	1	Yu Kitching	Hong Kong	10:45.11	NR
19	1	Melinder Ragbir Singh	Malaysia	11:07.64	SB
20	2	Meriem Aiach	Morocco	12:00.39	
	2	Kristina Dolmatova	Estonia	DQ	169.7a
	1	Oxana Juravel	Moldova	DNF	

=== Final ===
Rank	Name	Nationality	Time	Notes
1st place, gold medalist(s)	Binnaz Uslu	Turkey	9:33.50	PB
2nd place, silver medalist(s)	Lyudmila Kuzmina	Russia	9:44.77	
3rd place, bronze medalist(s)	Jin Yuan	China	9:45.21	SB
4	Giulia Martinelli	Italy	9:46.07	PB
5	Li Zhenzhu	China	9:50.44	SB
6	Sabine Heitling	Brazil	9:52.19	
7	Eleanor Waite	Great Britain	9:58.29	
8	Eva Krchová	Czech Republic	10:00.66	
9	Nolene Conrad	South Africa	10:02.31	
10	Gülcan Mıngır	Turkey	10:07.71	
11	Geneviève Lalonde	Canada	10:09.43	
	Selien de Schrijder	Belgium	DNF	
