= Athletics at the 2016 Summer Olympics – Women's 3000 metres steeplechase =

Women's 3000 metres steeplechase at the Games of the XXXI Olympiad
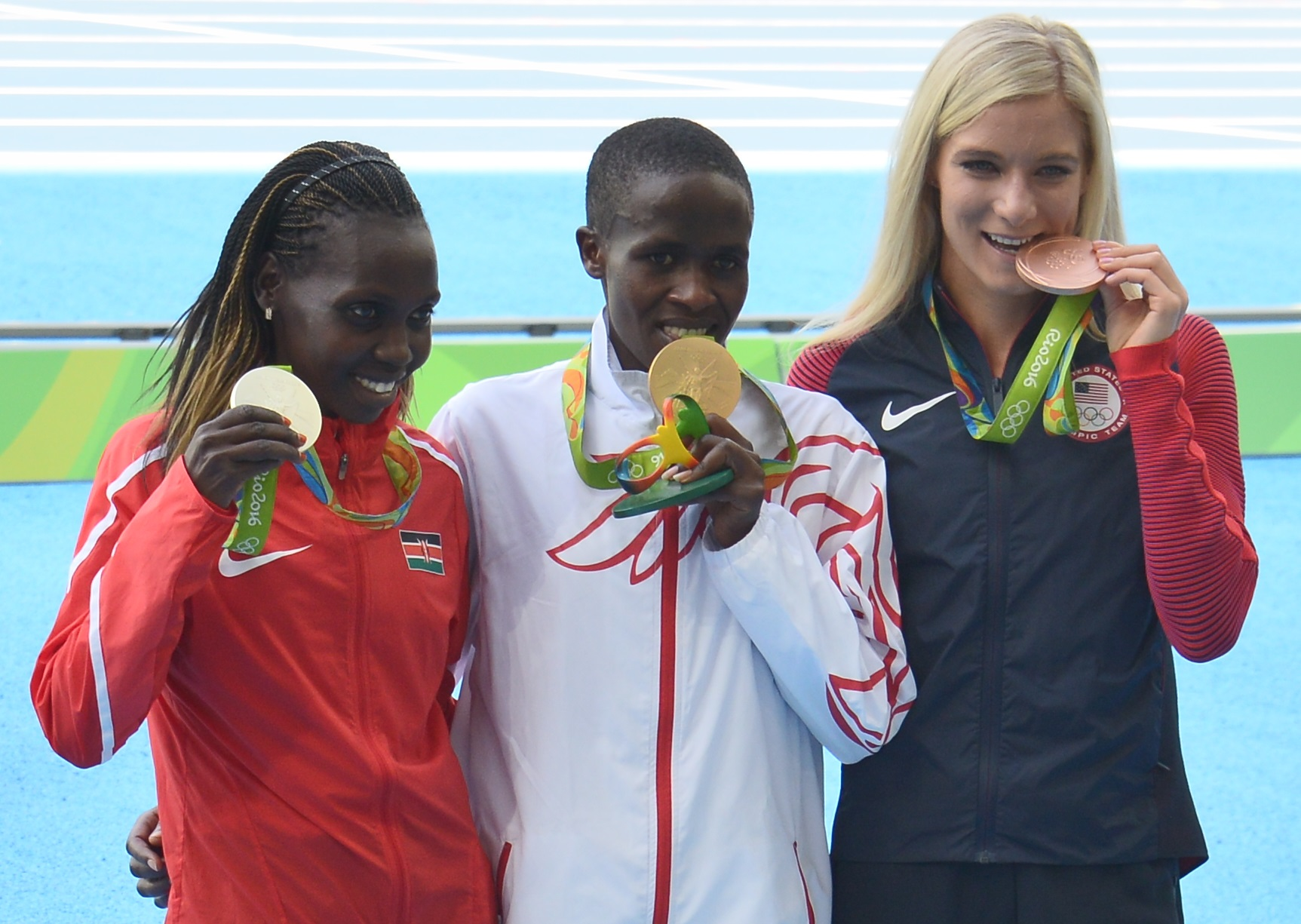
- Left-right: Jepkemoi, Jebet and Coburn
- Venue: Olympic Stadium
- Date: 13–15 August 2016
- Competitors: 53 from 32 nations
- Winning time: 8:59.75 AR

Medalists
| 1st place, gold medalist(s) | | Ruth Jebet | Bahrain |
| 2nd place, silver medalist(s) | | Hyvin Jepkemoi | Kenya |
| 3rd place, bronze medalist(s) | | Emma Coburn | United States |

Video on YouTube Official Video Highlights

The Women's 3000 metres steeplechase competition at the 2016 Summer Olympics took place between 13–15 August at the Olympic Stadium. The winning margin was 7.37 seconds.

== Summary ==
Tunisia's Habiba Ghribi returned to defend her 2012 Olympic steeplechase title, though she was outside the top 15 runners on the seasonal lists. The fastest time was held by Ruth Jebet of Bahrain, whose 8:59.97 minutes at the Prefontaine Classic at the end of May made her the second fastest ever in the discipline. The 2015 World Champion Hyvin Jepkemoi of Kenya was four hundredths of a second behind her in that race and had become the third fastest, while America's Emma Coburn had set a national record and was third ranked entering the competition. Ethiopians Etenesh Diro and Sofia Assefa and Kenya's Beatrice Chepkoech rounded out the top six. Gesa Felicitas Krause, a 2015 World medalist and 2016 European Champion, was her continent's best entrant.

Before the competition even began, entrant Silvia Danekova failed a doping test after her arrival in Rio. She submitted an appeal the Court of Arbitration for Sport where she was ruled ineligible for the race.

In the first round Jebet broke clear of the pack, ran her own race, and easily won her heat over Assefa and Krause. Chepkoech, Ghribi and Coburn took the top qualifying spots in the second race. Jepkemoi won the third and slowest heat, with Genevieve LaCaze and Courtney Frerichs taking the automatic qualifying spots. Etenesh Diro lost her shoe in that race after being stood on by an opponent and ran the remainder of the race barefoot; she failed to make the qualifying time but progressed upon appeal, as did Aisha Praught and Sara Louise Treacy. Four national records were broken, including Lalita Shivaji Babar's 9:19.76 minutes for India.

The strategy in this final was prefaced by the Prefontaine race in Eugene. In that race, Jebet broke away but was chased down by a last lap kick by Jepkemoi that almost caught her at the line. Coburn watched the chase from ten seconds back while setting the American record. Here Jebet knew she needed to create a bigger cushion to discourage Jepkemoi from chasing. After settling for just being near the front of the pack for the first two laps, Jebet accelerated with one barrier and five laps to go. Only three athletes, Jepkemoi, Chepkoech and Coburn, took off in pursuit, the rest of the field stringing out behind an ever-widening gap. After a 68-second lap, then a 69-second lap, Jebet had a 3-second lead on the Kenyan teammates with Coburn another 3 seconds back. After a 70-second lap, Chepkoech began to lose contact with her teammate. An encouraged Coburn set off in pursuit of a medal, passing the slowing Chepkoech with 1 and 3/4 laps to go. During the 71-second following lap, while Jebet was slowing slightly from the strain, Jepkemoi was consistently losing ground and Coburn could see she was close to Jepkemoi. Jepkemoi did not take off in hot pursuit of Jebet, more concerned with the challenge from behind. On the final backstretch, Coburn passed Jepkemoi for a few moments before Jepkemoi accelerated away going into the final water jump. Jebet cruised home unchallenged with a final lap just under 71, crossing the line in 8:59.75. Forgetting about Jebet, Jepkemoi used her best sprinting to beat Coburn to the line by a half second for silver. Coburn set the North American Continental Record 9:07.63 in third.

Jebet's time slightly improved her second best time in history, moving to less than a second of the world record. Coburn's time made her the number 8 performer in history. Even deeper down the list of finishers, there were many personal bests. Fourth place Chepkoech became #22 on the all-time list, sixth place Gesa Felicitas Krause became #31, seventh, eighth and ninth places Madeline Hills, Colleen Quigley and Genevieve LaCaze became #38, #42 and #43 respectively.

The medals were presented by Paul Tergat, IOC member, Kenya and Anna Riccardi, Council Member of the IAAF.

Less than two weeks later, Jebet would set the world record, improving her personal best by almost seven seconds and the world record by six.

Ruth Jebet has been suspended since February 2018 for testing positive for EPO, although her Olympic results are unaffected.

== Competition format ==
The women's 3000 m steeplechase competition consisted of heats and a final.

== Records ==
Prior to the competition, the existing World and Olympic records were as follows.

| World record | Gulnara Galkina (RUS) | 8:58.81 | Beijing, China | 17 August 2008 |
| Olympic record | Gulnara Galkina (RUS) | 8:58.81 | Beijing, China | 17 August 2008 |

The following national records were established during the competition:

| Country | Athlete | Round | Time | Notes |
|---|---|---|---|---|
| India | Lalita Babar (IND) | Heats | 9:19.76 | |
| Switzerland | Fabienne Schlumpf (SUI) | Heats | 9:30.54 | |
| Denmark | Anna Emilie Møller (DEN) | Heats | 9:32.68 | |
| Bahrain | Ruth Jebet (BRN) | Final | 8:59.75 | AR |
| United States | Emma Coburn (USA) | Final | 9:07.63 | AR |

== Schedule ==
All times are Brasilia Time (UTC-3)

| Date | Time | Round |
|---|---|---|
| Saturday, 13 August 2016 | 10:05 | Round 1 |
| Monday, 15 August 2016 | 11:15 | Finals |

== Results ==
=== Round 1 ===
Qualification rule: First 3 in each heat (Q) and the next 6 fastest (q) advance to the Final.

==== Heat 1 ====
| Rank | Name | Nationality | Time | Notes |
|---|---|---|---|---|
| 1 | Ruth Jebet | Bahrain | 9:12.62 | Q |
| 2 | Sofia Assefa | Ethiopia | 9:18.75 | Q |
| 3 | Gesa Felicitas Krause | Germany | 9:19.70 | Q |
| 4 | Colleen Quigley | United States | 9:21.82 | q |
| 5 | Lydia Rotich | Kenya | 9:30.21 | q |
| 6 | Mariya Shatalova | Ukraine | 9:30.89 | PB |
| 7 | Peruth Chemutai | Uganda | 9:31.03 | PB |
| 8 | Charlotta Fougberg | Sweden | 9:31.16 | |
| 9 | Özlem Kaya | Turkey | 9:32.03 | SB |
| 10 | Sviatlana Kudzelich | Belarus | 9:32.93 | SB |
| 11 | Fadwa Sidi Madane | Morocco | 9:32.94 | SB |
| 12 | Diana Martín | Spain | 9:44.07 | |
| 13 | Ingeborg Løvnes | Norway | 9:44.85 | |
| 14 | Kerry O'Flaherty | Ireland | 9:45.35 | SB |
| 15 | Juliana Paula dos Santos | Brazil | 9:45.95 | |
| 16 | Erin Teschuk | Canada | 9:53.70 | |
| 17 | Anju Takamizawa | Japan | 9:58.59 | |

==== Heat 2 ====
| Rank | Name | Nationality | Time | Notes |
|---|---|---|---|---|
| 1 | Beatrice Chepkoech | Kenya | 9:17.55 | Q |
| 2 | Emma Coburn | United States | 9:18.12 | Q |
| 3 | Habiba Ghribi | Tunisia | 9:18.71 | Q, SB |
| 4 | Lalita Babar | India | 9:19.76 | q, NR |
| 5 | Madeline Hills | Australia | 9:24.16 | q, SB |
| 6 | Fabienne Schlumpf | Switzerland | 9:30.54 | q, NR |
| 7 | Hiwot Ayalew | Ethiopia | 9:35.09 | |
| 8 | Matylda Kowal | Poland | 9:35.13 | PB |
| 9 | Sanaa Koubaa | Germany | 9:35.15 | PB |
| 10 | Victoria Mitchell | Australia | 9:39.40 | SB |
| 11 | Michelle Finn | Ireland | 9:49.45 | |
| 12 | Tigest Mekonin | Bahrain | 9:49.92 | |
| 13 | Maria Bernard | Canada | 9:50.17 | |
| 14 | Meryem Akda | Turkey | 9:50.28 | |
| 15 | Sandra Eriksson | Finland | 9:56.77 | |
| 16 | Luiza Gega | Albania | 9:58.49 | |
| 17 | Nastassia Puzakova | Belarus | 10:14.08 | |
| 18 | Amina Bettiche | Algeria | 10:26.91 | |

==== Heat 3 ====
Video on YouTube Official Video Highlights

| Rank | Name | Nationality | Result | Notes |
|---|---|---|---|---|
| 1 | Hyvin Jepkemoi | Kenya | 9:24.61 | Q |
| 2 | Genevieve LaCaze | Australia | 9:26.25 | Q |
| 3 | Courtney Frerichs | United States | 9:27.02 | Q |
| 4 | Geneviève Lalonde | Canada | 9:30.24 | q |
| 5 | Zhang Xinyan | China | 9:31.47 | |
| 6 | Anna Emilie Møller | Denmark | 9:32.68 | AJR, NR |
| 7 | Etenesh Diro | Ethiopia | 9:34.70 | q |
| 8 | Aisha Praught | Jamaica | 9:35.79 | q |
| 9 | Sudha Singh | India | 9:43.29 | |
| 10 | Salima Elouali Alami | Morocco | 9:44.83 | |
| 11 | Eliane Saholinirina | Madagascar | 9:45.92 | |
| 12 | Sara Louise Treacy | Ireland | 9:46.24 | q |
| 13 | Ancuța Bobocel | Romania | 9:46.28 | |
| 14 | Tuğba Güvenç | Turkey | 9:49.93 | SB |
| 15 | Maya Rehberg | Germany | 9:51.73 | |
| 16 | Belén Casetta | Argentina | 9:51.85 | |
| 17 | Lennie Waite | Great Britain | 10:14.18 | |

=== Final ===
| Rank | Name | Nationality | Time | Notes |
|---|---|---|---|---|
| 1st place, gold medalist(s) | Ruth Jebet | Bahrain | 8:59.75 | AR |
| 2nd place, silver medalist(s) | Hyvin Jepkemoi | Kenya | 9:07.12 | |
| 3rd place, bronze medalist(s) | Emma Coburn | United States | 9:07.63 | AR |
| 4 | Beatrice Chepkoech | Kenya | 9:16.05 | PB |
| 5 | Sofia Assefa | Ethiopia | 9:17.15 | SB |
| 6 | Gesa Felicitas Krause | Germany | 9:18.41 | PB |
| 7 | Madeline Heiner Hills | Australia | 9:20.38 | PB |
| 8 | Colleen Quigley | United States | 9:21.10 | PB |
| 9 | Genevieve LaCaze | Australia | 9:21.21 | PB |
| 10 | Lalita Babar | India | 9:22.74 | |
| 11 | Courtney Frerichs | United States | 9:22.87 | |
| 12 | Habiba Ghribi | Tunisia | 9:28.75 | |
| 13 | Lydia Rotich | Kenya | 9:29.90 | |
| 14 | Aisha Praught | Jamaica | 9:34.20 | |
| 15 | Etenesh Diro | Ethiopia | 9:38.77 | |
| 16 | Geneviève Lalonde | Canada | 9:41.88 | |
| 17 | Sara Louise Treacy | Ireland | 9:52.70 | |
| 18 | Fabienne Schlumpf | Switzerland | 9:59.30 | |
