= 2015 Asian Athletics Championships – Women's 3000 metres steeplechase =

The women's 3000 metres steeplechase at the 2015 Asian Athletics Championships was held on June 6.

== Results ==
| Rank | Name | Nationality | Time | Notes |
|---|---|---|---|---|
| 1st place, gold medalist(s) | Lalita Babar | India | 9:34.13 | CR |
| 2nd place, silver medalist(s) | Li Zhenzhu | China | 9:41.43 | |
| 3rd place, bronze medalist(s) | Zhang Xinyan | China | 9:46.82 | |
| 4 | Ok Byol Ju | North Korea | 10:26.06 | |
| 5 | Anju Takamizawa | Japan | 10:47.07 | |
| 6 | Un Hwa Jang | North Korea | 11:31.82 | |
