= Yoshika Arai =

Japanese steeplechase runner

Medal record

Women's athletics

Representing Japan

Asian Athletics Championships
Gold medal – first place	2009 Guangzhou	3000 m s'chase

Yoshika Arai (Japanese: 荒井 悦加, née Tatsumi Japanese: 辰巳; born 26 February 1982) is a Japanese middle- and long-distance runner who specialises in the 3000 metres steeplechase. Her personal best for that event is 9:55.93 minutes.

She took up the steeplechase event in 2007 and represented her country at the 2007 World Championships in Athletics, held in Osaka. Her first major medal came at the 2009 Asian Athletics Championships, where she won in a championship record.

Earlier in her career, Arai was a frequent runner-up to Minori Hayakari at the Japan Championships in Athletics, but she took national titles in both 2012 and 2013. She also placed fourth at the 2013 Asian Athletics Championships.

== Career ==
Born in Shimane Prefecture, she attended Matsue Kita High School, before going on to study at Shimane University. Following her graduation, she took up running professionally through corporate teams, including Wako, Noritz Corporation and Deodeo. During the early part of her career she mainly competed in the 800 metres and 1500 metres and regularly ranked within the top ten at the Japan Championships in Athletics.

She began to progress in the sport in 2007, after taking up cross country running and the steeplechase. She was chosen for the 2007 Asian Cross Country Championships in March and came eighth, helping the Japanese women's team (including Minori Hayakari and Eri Kotake) to second in the rankings. She gradually improved her steeplechase best in the outdoor track season, coming third at the Oda Memorial and culminating in a personal best of 9:57.02 minutes for second at the National Championships. This earned her a place at the 2007 World Championships in Athletics in Osaka, but she was much slower there and was eliminated in the qualifying rounds.

Arai focused on the steeplechase in 2008 and dipped under ten minutes again at the Barcelona Meeting, but was some way behind Hayakari and Kazuka Wakatsuki and the Japanese Championships and was not selected for the 2008 Beijing Olympics. In 2009, she won at the Oda Memorial, then was runner-up to Hayakari at the Japanese Championships. While Hayakari competed at the 2009 World Championships in Athletics, Arai was chosen as Japan's representative for the 2009 Asian Athletics Championships – there she defeated all-comers and won the gold medal in a championship record time of 10:05.94 minutes. She was again the Japanese runner-up at the 2010 nationals and she did not compete in 2011. National rival Hayakari beat her Asian championship record in 2011.

Arai returned to competition in 2012 and won her first national title at the 2012 Japan Championships in Athletics, as compatriot Hayakari (nearing forty) faltered in the final. Arai's winning time of 9:55.93 minutes was not sufficient for selection for Japan at the 2012 Summer Olympics, however. The following year she retained her steeplechase title at the 2013 Japan Championships in Athletics and placed fourth at the 2013 Asian Athletics Championships.
