= Athletics at the 2014 Asian Games – Women's 3000 metres steeplechase =

Women's sports event

Women's 3000 metres steeplechase at the 2014 Asian Games
- Venue: Incheon Asiad Main Stadium
- Dates: 27 September 2014
- Competitors: 10 from 7 nations

Medalists
gold medal	Ruth Jebet	Bahrain
silver medal	Li Zhenzhu	China
bronze medal	Lalita Babar	India

The women's 3000 metres steeplechase event at the 2014 Asian Games was held at the Incheon Asiad Main Stadium, Incheon, South Korea on 27 September.

== Schedule ==
All times are Korea Standard Time (UTC+09:00)

Date	Time	Event
Saturday, 27 September 2014	21:25	Final

== Records ==
Prior to this competition, the existing world, Asian and Games records were as follows.

World Record	Gulnara Samitova-Galkina (RUS)	8:58.81	Beijing, China	17 August 2008
Asian Record	Ruth Jebet (BRN)	9:20.55	Zurich, Switzerland	28 August 2014
Games Record	Sudha Singh (IND)	9:55.67	Guangzhou, China	21 November 2010

== Results ==
Rank	Athlete	Time	Notes
1st place, gold medalist(s)	Ruth Jebet (BRN)	9:31.36	GR
2nd place, silver medalist(s)	Li Zhenzhu (CHN)	9:35.23	
3rd place, bronze medalist(s)	Lalita Babar (IND)	9:35.37	
4	Sudha Singh (IND)	9:35.64	
5	Rini Budiarti (INA)	9:49.46	
6	Misaki Sango (JPN)	9:52.26	
7	Mayuko Nakamura (JPN)	10:08.67	
8	Irina Moroz (UZB)	10:32.89	
9	Lee Se-jung (KOR)	10:35.78	
10	Rosemary Katua (BRN)	10:45.69	
