= 2015 World Championships in Athletics – Women's 3000 metres steeplechase =

Women's 3000 metres steeplechase at the 2015 World Championships
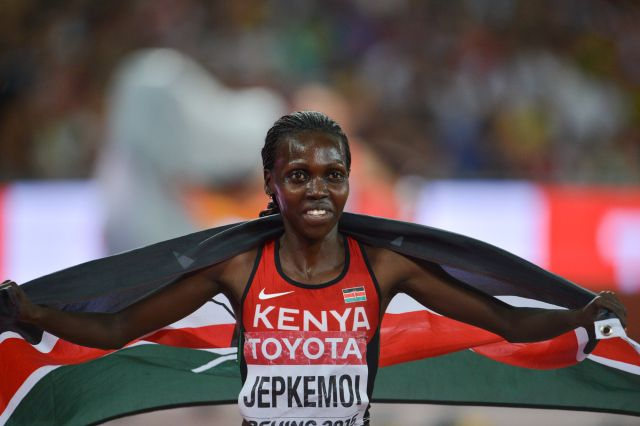
- Winner Hyvin Jepkemoi
- Venue: Beijing National Stadium
- Dates: 24 August (heats); 26 August (final)
- Competitors: 45 from 26 nations
- Winning time: 9:19.11

Medalists
gold medal	Hyvin Jepkemoi	Kenya
silver medal	Habiba Ghribi	Tunisia
bronze medal	Gesa Felicitas Krause	Germany

The women's 3000 metres steeplechase at the 2015 World Championships in Athletics was held at the Beijing National Stadium on 24 and 26 August.

== Summary ==
The reigning champion from 2013 Milcah Chemos Cheywa was absent from the competition due to a back injury.

This championship race had a preview of sorts at the 2015 Herculis meet in Monaco where most of the finalists raced to a different order. That race was won by Habiba Ghribi in the world leading time. This final was going to be slower and tactical, everybody was watching each other. A lap into the race, Lalita Babar broke away, building up a 10 to 15 meter gap on the pack. She was treated as a breakaway in a bicycle racing, but the peloton didn't give chase. With 2 laps to go, the pack led by Emma Coburn swallowed up the lead and went past. For the next lap, the pack was content to let Coburn lead, Ghribi coming up to her shoulder and the rest going sometimes five abreast over the barriers. At the bell, Ghribi took the lead, Hyvin Kiyeng Jepkemoi and Coburn battling down the backstretch. Going into the final water jump Jepkemoi finally passed Coburn, with Gesa Felicitas Krause and Sofia Assefa forming a tight pack of five to sprint for the medals. As Krause pressed Ghribi from the inside, Jepkemoi had to swing wide out to lane two to find some running room. Krause took the lead over the final barrier as Ghribi stuttered. Ghribi was stronger to take the lead back from Krause but Jepkemoi ran past both of them on the outside and on to victory.

== Records ==
Prior to the competition, the records were as follows:

World record	Gulnara Samitova-Galkina (RUS)	8:58.81	Beijing, China	17 August 2008
Championship record	Yekaterina Volkova (RUS)	9:06.57	Osaka, Japan	27 August 2007
World leading	Habiba Ghribi (TUN)	9:11.28	Fontvieille, Monaco	17 July 2015
African record	Milcah Chemos Cheywa (KEN)	9:07.14	Oslo, Norway	7 June 2012
Asian record	Ruth Jebet (BHR)	9:20.55	Zürich, Switzerland	28 August 2014
NACAC record	Emma Coburn (USA)	9:11.42	Glasgow, United Kingdom	12 July 2014
South American record	Sabine Heitling (BRA)	9:41.22	London, United Kingdom	25 July 2009
European record	Gulnara Samitova-Galkina (RUS)	8:58.81	Beijing, China	17 August 2008
Oceanian record	Donna MacFarlane (AUS)	9:18.35	Oslo, Norway	6 June 2008

== Qualification standards ==
Entry standards
9:44.00

== Schedule ==
Date	Time	Round
24 August 2015	09:45	Heats
26 August 2015	21:00	Final

All times are local times (UTC+8)

== Results ==
KEY:	Q	Qualified	q	Fastest non-qualifiers	NR	National record	PB	Personal best	SB	Seasonal best

=== Heats ===
Qualification: First 3 in each heat (Q) and the next 6 fastest (q) advanced to the final.

Rank	Heat	Name	Nationality	Time	Notes
1	2	Habiba Ghribi	Tunisia	9:24.38	Q
2	2	Gesa Felicitas Krause	Germany	9:24.92	Q
3	1	Hiwot Ayalew	Ethiopia	9:25.55	Q
4	2	Rosefline Chepngetich	Kenya	9:25.91	Q, PB
5	3	Hyvin Jepkemoi	Kenya	9:26.19	Q
6	3	Sofia Assefa	Ethiopia	9:26.47	Q
7	3	Emma Coburn	United States	9:27.19	Q
8	2	Lalita Babar	India	9:27.86	q, NR
9	3	Fadwa Sidi Madane	Morocco	9:27.87	q, PB
10	3	Ruth Jebet	Bahrain	9:27.93	q
11	2	Salima El Ouali Alami	Morocco	9:28.18	q
12	1	Virginia Nyambura	Kenya	9:28.50	Q
13	2	Colleen Quigley	United States	9:29.09	q
14	1	Stephanie Garcia	United States	9:29.34	Q
15	2	Özlem Kaya	Turkey	9:30.23	q, PB
16	1	Madeline Heiner	Australia	9:30.79	
17	3	Etenesh Diro	Ethiopia	9:31.97	
18	1	Amina Bettiche	Algeria	9:36.10	SB
19	1	Geneviève Lalonde	Canada	9:36.83	
20	2	Mariya Shatalova	Ukraine	9:36.87	PB
21	1	Maruša Mišmaš	Slovenia	9:37.73	
22	3	Genevieve LaCaze	Australia	9:39.35	
23	3	Sandra Eriksson	Finland	9:39.64	
24	2	Birtukan Fente	Ethiopia	9:39.77	
25	2	Erin Teschuk	Canada	9:40.07	PB
26	2	Victoria Mitchell	Australia	9:43.73	
27	3	Lucie Sekanová	Czech Republic	9:45.72	
28	2	Silvia Danekova	Bulgaria	9:46.31	
29	2	Sara Louise Treacy	Ireland	9:48.24	
30	3	Klara Bodinson	Sweden	9:50.13	
31	2	Charlotta Fougberg	Sweden	9:50.79	
32	1	Camilla Richardsson	Finland	9:53.13	
33	1	Michelle Finn	Ireland	9:55.27	
34	1	Muriel Coneo	Colombia	9:55.53	
35	3	Tuğba Güvenç	Turkey	9:58.07	
36	1	Lyudmila Lebedeva	Russia	9:58.65	
37	1	Rosa Flanagan	New Zealand	10:00.71	
38	3	Natalya Aristarkhova	Russia	10:02.79	
39	3	Kerry O'Flaherty	Ireland	10:05.10	
40	3	Zhang Xinyan	China	10:13.25	
41	2	Ekaterina Doseykina	Russia	10:13.26	
42	3	Rolanda Bell	Panama	10:33.78	
	1	Sviatlana Kudzelich	Belarus	DNF	
	1	Hanane Ouhaddou	Morocco	DQ	R163.3b
	1	Aisha Praught	Jamaica	DQ	R163.3b

=== Final ===
The final was held at 21:00.

Rank	Name	Nationality	Time	Notes
1st place, gold medalist(s)	Hyvin Jepkemoi	Kenya	9:19.11	
2nd place, silver medalist(s)	Habiba Ghribi	Tunisia	9:19.24	
3rd place, bronze medalist(s)	Gesa Felicitas Krause	Germany	9:19.25	PB
4	Sofia Assefa	Ethiopia	9:20.01	SB
5	Emma Coburn	United States	9:21.78	
6	Hiwot Ayalew	Ethiopia	9:24.27	
7	Virginia Nyambura	Kenya	9:26.21	
8	Lalita Babar	India	9:29.64	
9	Stephanie Garcia	United States	9:31.06	
10	Salima El Ouali Alami	Morocco	9:32.15	
11	Ruth Jebet	Bahrain	9:33.41	
12	Colleen Quigley	United States	9:34.29	
13	Özlem Kaya	Turkey	9:34.66	
14	Fadwa Sidi Madane	Morocco	9:41.45	
15	Rosefline Chepngetich	Kenya	9:46.08	
