= Tunisia at the 2022 World Athletics Championships =

- WA code: TUN

in Eugene, United States 15 July 2022 – 24 July 2022
- Competitors: 4 (3 men and 1 woman) in 3 events
- Medals: Gold 0 Silver 0 Bronze 0 Total 0

World Athletics Championships appearances
- 1983; 1987; 1991; 1993; 1995; 1997; 1999; 2001; 2003; 2005; 2007; 2009; 2011; 2013; 2015; 2017; 2019; 2022; 2023; 2025

Tunisia competed at the 2022 World Athletics Championships in Eugene, United States, from 15 to 24 July 2022.

== Results ==
Tunisia entered 4 athletes.

Key

- Q = Qualified for the next round
- q = Qualified for the next round as a fastest loser or, in field events, by position without achieving the qualifying target
- NR = National record
- PB = Personal best
- SB = Season best
- N/A = Round not applicable for the event

=== Men ===
Track and road events

Athlete	Event	Heat		Semi-final		Final	
Athlete	Event	Result	Rank	Result	Rank	Result	Rank
Abdessalem Ayouni	800 m	1:46.59	23 Q	1:46.08	12	Did not advance	
Mohamed Amin Jhinaoui	3000 m steeplechase	8:22.00	18	—N/a		Did not advance	
Ahmed Jaziri	3000 m steeplechase	8:28.28	26	—N/a		Did not advance	

=== Women ===
Track and road events

Athlete	Event	Heat		Semi-final		Final	
Athlete	Event	Result	Rank	Result	Rank	Result	Rank
Marwa Bouzayani	3000 m steeplechase	9:12.14 PB	3 Q	—N/a		9:20.92	9
