= 2009 Asian Athletics Championships – Women's 3000 metres steeplechase =

The women's 3000 metres steeplechase event at the 2009 Asian Athletics Championships was held at the Guangdong Olympic Stadium on November 12.

== Results ==
Rank	Name	Nationality	Time	Notes
1st place, gold medalist(s)	Yoshika Tatsumi	Japan	10:05.94	
2nd place, silver medalist(s)	Sudha Singh	India	10:10.77	PB
3rd place, bronze medalist(s)	Kiran Tiwari	India	10:34.55	
4	Fang Xiaoyu	China	10:37.92	
5	Melinder Kaur Ragbir Singh	Malaysia	11:07.36	
6	Ala' Khalifah	Jordan	11:30.77	PB
7	Leila Ebrahimi	Iran	11:35.76	
