= Minori Hayakari =

Japanese track and field athlete (born 1972)

Personal information
- Born: 29 November 1972 (age 53) Kyoto, Japan

Sport
- Sport: Track and field
Medal record
Representing Japan
Asian Games
Bronze medal – third place	2010 Guangzhou	3000 m steeplechase
Asian Championships
Gold medal – first place	2011 Kobe	3000 m steeplechase
East Asian Games
Silver medal – second place	1997 Busan	800 m
Silver medal – second place	2009 Hong Kong	3000 m steeplechase
Bronze medal – third place	1997 Busan	1500 m

Minori Hayakari (早狩実紀) (born 29 November 1972) is a Japanese track and field athlete who specialises in the 3000 metres steeplechase. Her personal best of 9:33.93 minutes is the Japanese record and she has won straight Japanese national titles since the first event in 2005, taking her sixth title in 2011.

She became the first international female steeplechaser from her country, following the event's introduction to the World Championships in 2005, where she set an Asian record. She has featured in the World Championship steeplechase event from 2005 to 2011 and represented Japan in the first ever Olympic women's steeplechase at the 2008 Beijing Olympics.

In regional competition, she was the bronze medallist at the 2010 Asian Games and took the continental title at the 2011 Asian Athletics Championships. She is a five-time participant at the IAAF World Cross Country Championships and a two-time medallist at the East Asian Games (1999 and 2009).

== Career ==
=== Early career ===
Born in Kyoto, Hayakari attended Kyoto Yawata High School and later graduated from Doshisha University with a degree in business studies. She began her athletics career as a middle-distance runner. She broke onto the national scene with a high school record over 3000 m in 1990. She finished in the top ten in the junior races at the IAAF World Cross Country Championships in 1990 and 1991. Her international senior debut came at the 1991 World Championships in Athletics held in Tokyo, where she ran in the heats of the 3000 m. She placed sixth in the 1500 metres at the 1995 Universiade and following her graduation she won a Japanese national championship double over 800 metres and 1500 metres. She represented Japan in both these events at the 1997 East Asian Games and won the 800 m silver medal and 1500 m bronze medal.

Hayakari consistency ranked in the top three middle distance runners at the Japanese Athletics Championships from the late 1990s up to 2005. Over this period she set a career 800 m best of 2:07.93 minutes in Osaka, represented Japan at the 1999 IAAF World Indoor Championships in Maebashi, and ran in the short race at the World Cross Country Championships in 2002 and 2005. She made an appearance over the half marathon distance at the Kobe Women's Half Marathon and won the event in a time of 1:12:27 hours.

=== Steeplechaser ===
The women's steeplechase was set to be introduced at the 2005 World Championships in Athletics and Hayakari, who was infrequently selected for international competition, decided to switch to the new event. She ran in the event's first ever heat at the championships and qualified for the final with an Asian record time of 9:41.21 minutes. She was the only Asian participant in the competition and finished twelfth in the final.

In 2006, she won the first Japanese women's steeplechase title and was Asia's representative in the event at the 2006 IAAF World Cup. She also ran at the World Cross Country that year, her final outing at the competition, and finished 77th. She repeated as national champion the year after and ran a Japanese record time of 9:38.68 minutes (her Asian record had been bettered by a number of Chinese runners). She was again selected for the national team at the 2007 World Championships in Athletics, held in Osaka, but she fell mid-race and had to be stretchered off the track. She became Japan's first Olympic representative in the women's steeplechase at the 2008 Beijing Olympics and also improved her national record that year, running 9:33.93 minutes at the FBK Games. The year after she ran her season's best of 9:39.28 minutes in the heats of the 2009 World Championships in Athletics, then was runner-up to Li Zhenzhu at the 2009 East Asian Games.

Her 2010 season was highlighted by her fifth consecutive national title, a steeplechase bronze medal at the 2010 Asian Games (the first time the event was held at the competition) and an appearance at the 2010 IAAF Continental Cup (eleventh overall).

In June 2011, the 38-year-old Hayakari won her sixth straight national title in the 3,000 steeplechase with a solo run completed in 9:52.98. In the following month, she claimed her first continental title at the 2011 Asian Athletics Championships in Kobe, beating Asian Games champion Sudha Singh to take the gold medal in a championships record time. Hayakari ran at her fourth straight world steeplechase at the 2011 World Championships in Athletics, but was seventh in her heat and again she did not make the final.

=== Masters ===
In 2018, she set the W45 Masters World Record in the 2000 metres steeplechase 6:51.51, while winning the 2018 World Masters Athletics Championships.

== See also ==
- List of Asian Games medalists in athletics
