= Giulia Martinelli =

Italian runner

Personal information
- National team: Italy (4 caps)
- Born: 16 June 1991 (age 35) Rieti, Italy
- Height: 1.67 m (5 ft 6 in)
- Weight: 43 kg (95 lb)

Sport
- Sport: Athletics
- Event(s): Long-distance running Steeplechase
- Club: Studentesca Cariri; G.S. Forestale; C.S. Carabinieri
- Coached by: Fabiola Paoletti

Achievements and titles
- Personal bests: 3000 m: 9:13.09 (2011); 5000 m: 16:16.7 (2012); 3000 m st: 9:39.21 (2011)

Giulia Martinelli (born 16 June 1991) is an Italian long-distance runner and steeplechase runner.

== Career ==
In 2012 despite having obtained the standard (both IAAF and FIDAL), for participation in the London 2012 Olympic Games, she was excluded from the team for technical choice by Italian Athletics Federation.

== Achievements ==
Senior

Year	Competition	Venue	Position	Event	Time	Notes
2011	European Team Championships	(Sweden) Stockholm	7th	3000 m steeplechase	9:52.78	
2011	Universiade	(China) Shenzhen	4th	3000 m steeplechase	9:46.07	PB
2012	European Championships	(Finland) Helsinki	Semifinal	3000 m steeplechase	9:57.19	
2013	Mediterranean Games	(Turkey) Mersin	Final	3000 m steeplechase	DNF	

== See also ==
- Italian all-time top lists – 3000 m steeplechase
- Italy at the 2012 European Athletics Championships
- Italy at the 2013 Mediterranean Games
- Athletics at the 2012 Summer Olympics – Qualification
