= Tunisia at the 2009 World Championships in Athletics =

- WA code: TUN

in Berlin
- Competitors: 5 (2 men, 3 women)
- Medals: Gold 0 Silver 0 Bronze 0 Total 0

World Championships in Athletics appearances
- 1983; 1987; 1991; 1993; 1995; 1997; 1999; 2001; 2003; 2005; 2007; 2009; 2011; 2013; 2015; 2017; 2019; 2022; 2023

Tunisia competed at the 2009 World Championships in Athletics held from 15–23 August in Berlin.

== Team selection ==
Track and road events

| Event | Athletes | |
| Event | Men | Women |
|---|---|---|
| 3000 m steeplechase | | Habiba Ghribi |
| 20 km race walk | Hassanine Sebei | Olfa Lafi; Chaima Trabelsi |

Field and combined events

| Event | Athletes | |
| Event | Men | Women |
|---|---|---|
| Javelin throw | Mohamed Ali Kebabou | |

== Results ==
=== Men ===
Track and road events

| Event | Athletes | Final | |
| Event | Athletes | Result | Rank |
|---|---|---|---|
| 20 km walk | Hassanine Sebei | 1:22:52 | 19 |

Field and combined events

| Event | Athletes | Qualification | | Final | |
| Event | Athletes | Result | Rank | Result | Rank |
|---|---|---|---|---|---|
| Javelin throw | Mohamed Ali Kebabou | | | | |

=== Women ===
Track and road events

| Event | Athletes | Heats | | Final | |
| Event | Athletes | Result | Rank | Result | Rank |
|---|---|---|---|---|---|
| 3000 m steeplechase | Habiba Ghribi | 9:26.40 | 6 | 9:12.52 NR | 6 |
| 20 km walk | Olfa Lafi | - | | | |
| 20 km walk | Chaima Trabelsi | - | | 1:39:50 | 31 |
