= Tunisia at the 2015 World Championships in Athletics =

- WA code: TUN

in Beijing
- Competitors: 4
- Medals Ranked 25th: Gold 0 Silver 1 Bronze 0 Total 1

World Championships in Athletics appearances
- 1983; 1987; 1991; 1993; 1995; 1997; 1999; 2001; 2003; 2005; 2007; 2009; 2011; 2013; 2015; 2017; 2019; 2022; 2023

Tunisia competed at the 2015 World Championships in Athletics in Beijing, China, from 22 to 30 August 2015.

== Medalists ==
Medal	Athlete	Event	Date
Silver	Habiba Ghribi	3000 metres steeplechase	26 August

== Results ==
(q – qualified, NM – no mark, SB – season best)

=== Men ===
Track and road events

Athlete	Event	Heat		Semifinal		Final	
Athlete	Event	Result	Rank	Result	Rank	Result	Rank
Wissem Hosni	Marathon	—				DNF	
Mohamed Sghaier	400 metres hurdles	DQ		Did not advance			
Amor Ben Yahia	3000 metres steeplechase	8:43.11	5	—		Did not advance	

=== Women ===
Track and road events

Athlete	Event	Heat		Semifinal		Final	
Athlete	Event	Result	Rank	Result	Rank	Result	Rank
Habiba Ghribi	3000 metres steeplechase	9:24.38	1 Q	—		9:19.24	2nd place, silver medalist(s)
