= 2013 Asian Athletics Championships – Women's 3000 metres steeplechase =

The women's 3000 metres steeplechase at the 2013 Asian Athletics Championships was held at the Shree Shiv Chhatrapati Sports Complex on 5 July.

== Results ==
Rank	Name	Nationality	Time	Notes
1st place, gold medalist(s)	Ruth Jebet	Bahrain	9:40.84	CR
2nd place, silver medalist(s)	Sudha Singh	India	9:56.27	
3rd place, bronze medalist(s)	Pak Kum Hyang	North Korea	10:09.80	
4	Yoshiko Arai	Japan	10:11.36	
5	Eranga Rashila Dulakshi	Sri Lanka	10:18.39	
6	Misato Horie	Japan	10:24.55	
7	Kiran Tiwari	India	10:48.02	
8	Chen Chao-Chun	Chinese Taipei	10:53.08	
9	Priyanka Singh Patel	India	11:07.34	
