= 2011 Asian Athletics Championships – Women's 3000 metres steeplechase =

The women's 5000 metres at the 2011 Asian Athletics Championships was held at the Kobe Universiade Memorial Stadium on 9 July.

== Results ==
Rank	Name	Nationality	Time	Notes
1st place, gold medalist(s)	Minori Hayakari	Japan	9:52.42	CR
2nd place, silver medalist(s)	Sudha Singh	India	10:08.52	
3rd place, bronze medalist(s)	Nguyễn Thị Phương	Vietnam	10:14.94	
4	Misato Horie	Japan	10:23.87	
5	Rini Budiarti	Indonesia	10:30.38	
6	Priyanka Singh Patel	India	10:56.88	
7	Melinder Kaur Ragbir Singh	Malaysia	11:20.13	
8	Yiu Kit Ching	Hong Kong	11:24.92	
	Leila Ebrahimymojavery	Iran	DNS	
