= Tunisia at the 2011 World Championships in Athletics =

- WA code: TUN
- National federation: Fédération Tunisienne d'Athlétisme
- Website: www.tunisathle.voilà.net

in Daegu
- Competitors: 5
- Medals: Gold 1 Silver 0 Bronze 0 Total 1

World Championships in Athletics appearances
- 1983; 1987; 1991; 1993; 1995; 1997; 1999; 2001; 2003; 2005; 2007; 2009; 2011; 2013; 2015; 2017; 2019; 2022; 2023

Tunisia competed at the 2011 World Championships in Athletics from August 27 to September 4 in Daegu, South Korea.

== Team selection ==
A team of 5 athletes was announced to represent the country in the event.

== Medalists ==
The following competitor from Tunisia won a medal at the Championships

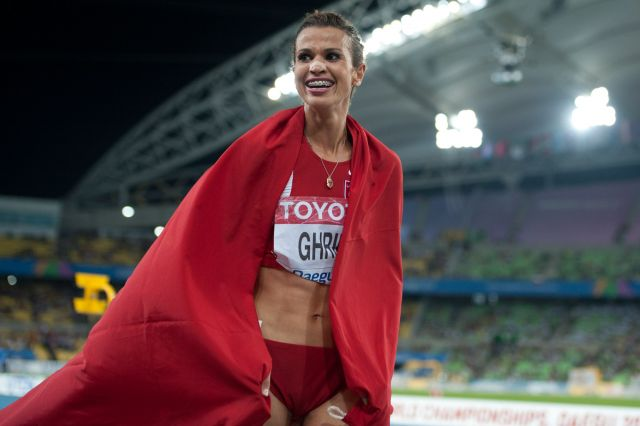
Habiba Ghribi won a gold medal in the Women's 3000 metres steeplechase event

Medal	Athlete	Event
Gold	Habiba Ghribi	3000 metres steeplechase

== Results ==
=== Men ===
Athlete	Event	Preliminaries		Heats		Semifinals		Final	
Athlete	Event	Time Width Height	Rank	Time Width Height	Rank	Time Width Height	Rank	Time Width Height	Rank
Amor Ben Yahia	3000 metres steeplechase			8:30.02	19			did not advance	
Hassanine Sebei	20 kilometres walk							1:25:17	26
Hédi Teraoui	20 kilometres walk							1:29:48	34

=== Women ===
Athlete	Event	Preliminaries		Heats		Semifinals		Final	
Athlete	Event	Time Width Height	Rank	Time Width Height	Rank	Time Width Height	Rank	Time Width Height	Rank
Habiba Ghribi	3000 metres steeplechase			9:24.56	2			9:11.97 NR	1st place, gold medalist(s)
Chaima Trabelsi	20 kilometres walk							1:46:29	40
