= Emma Coburn =

American middle-distance runner

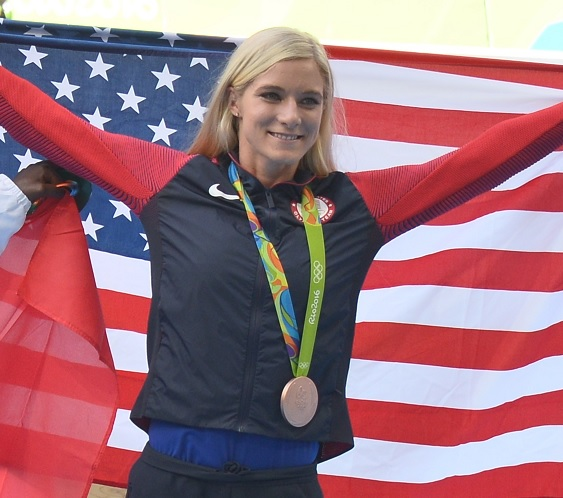
- Coburn at the 2016 Summer Olympics

Personal information
- Born: October 19, 1990 (age 36) Boulder, Colorado, U.S.
- Home town: Crested Butte, Colorado
- Employer: New Balance
- Height: 5 ft 8 in (173 cm)
- Weight: 120 lb (54 kg)

Sport
- Country: United States
- Sport: Athletics/Track
- Events: Steeplechase, 3000 meters, 1500 meters
- College team: Colorado Buffaloes
- Coached by: Joe Bosshard

Achievements and titles
- Olympic finals: 2012 London; 3000 m s'chase, 8th; 2016 Rio de Janeiro; 3000 m s'chase, Bronze; 2020 Tokyo; 3000 m s'chase, ~~14th~~ DQ
- World finals: 2011 Daegu; 3000 m s'chase, 8th; 2015 Beijing; 3000 m s'chase, 5th; 2017 London; 3000 m s'chase, Gold; 2019 Doha; 3000 m s'chase, Silver; 2022 Eugene; 3000 m s'chase, 8th
- Personal bests: 800 m: 2:01.10 (Los Angeles 2020); 1500 m: 4:03.82 (Nashville 2020); Mile: 4:23.65 (Marion 2020); 3000 m: 8:48.60 (Birmingham 2017); 5000 m: 15:24.76 (Austin 2021); 2000 m s'chase: 6:44.42 (Greensboro 2008); 3000 m s'chase: 9:02.35 (Doha 2019); Indoors; 1000 m: 2:52.43 (College Station 2009); 1500 m: 4:12.31 (New York 2013); Mile: 4:29.86 i (New York 2013); 2000 m: 5:41.11 (Boston 2015); 3000 m: 8:39.19 i + (Staten Island 2021); 2-Mile: 9:15.71 a (Staten Island 2021); Road; Mile: 4:20.3 a (New York 2018)
Medal record
Women's athletics
Representing the United States
Olympic Games
Bronze medal – third place	2016 Rio de Janeiro	3000 m s'chase
World Championships
Gold medal – first place	2017 London	3000 m s'chase
Silver medal – second place	2019 Doha	3000 m s'chase
Representing Americas
Continental Cup
Gold medal – first place	2014 Marrakech	3000 m s'chase

Emma Jane Coburn (born October 19, 1990) is an American middle-distance runner who specializes in the 3000-meters steeplechase. She holds the distinction of being a world champion, world silver medalist, Olympic bronze medalist, three-time Olympian and 10-time US National Champion in the steeplechase.

At the 2017 World Championships in London, Coburn made history by taking gold thereby becoming the first American since 1952 to win a world steeplechase title. At the event she set a championship record of 9:02.58 and broke her own American record by five seconds.

She is a three-time Olympian making the US team in 2012, 2016 and 2020. At the 2016 Olympic Games in Rio she captured the bronze medal becoming the first American woman to medal in an Olympic steeplechase event. Her finishing time of 9:07.63 established a then-new American record.

Her other steeplechase achievements include earning a silver medal at the 2019 World Championships in Doha, reaching the 2012 Olympic final (8th place), and competing in the World Championship finals in 2011 (10th) and 2015 (5th). She also won the 2014 IAAF Continental Cup and is a ten-time United States National Champion winning the event in each of the years she competed (2011, 2012, 2014–2019, 2021, 2022).

== High school career ==
Coburn attended Crested Butte Community School. She was a multi-sport athlete competing in cross-country, volleyball, basketball and track. In 2007, when she was a junior in high school, she traveled to Albuquerque, New Mexico to run in an 800-meters event. While there her father encouraged Coburn to run in another event to make the six hour, 350 mile drive from her home worthwhile. However, because of schedule conflicts, the only event possible was the 2,000-meters steeplechase, which Coburn had never run before and knew little about. She won the race and qualified for the high school national meet. This serendipitous moment launched her steeplechase career. In 2008, she ran 6:42 to finish second at the 2008 Nike Outdoor Nationals Track and Field Championships in the 2000-meters steeplechase.

== College career ==
Coburn attended the University of Colorado from 2008 to 2013 where she was a three-time NCAA champion, capturing two steeplechase titles and one indoor mile title. She earned All-America honors six-times.

Coburn ran cross-country from 2008 to 2011. During her senior year in cross-country, she earned All-PAC-12 First Team, all-region, and All-America honors. She helped the Buffs win the inaugural PAC-12 title, tie for first place in the regional championships, and place 11th at NCAA National Cross-Country Championships. Her 20th-place finish over the six-kilometer distance at the NCAA national cross-country championships contributed to her team's 11th-place finish, as she was Colorado's second place runner in the event.

Coburn joined the track team in 2009 when she tried a number of disciplines before eventually concentrating on the steeplechase. She qualified for the NCAA Championships at Fayetteville in the event advancing to the final after running a then personal record (PR) of 10:06.21, which also doubled as the USA Junior record in the event. In the final, she ran 10:22.58 to finished 11th to cap off her first season.

In 2010, Coburn won the PAC-12 steeplechase title as a sophomore and finished second in the NCAA championships.

In 2011, as a junior, Coburn won both the PAC-12 indoor 3000-meters title and the PAC-12 3000-meters steeplechase title. She then went on to capture the NCAA 3000-meters steeplechase title. She also won the 2011 USA outdoor title in the steeplechase and made the US steeplechase team for the 2011 World Championships, finishing 12th in the final.

In 2012, Coburn did not compete for her collegiate team. She was redshirted and competed in track events as an unattached athlete so she could focus on the US Olympic Trials. In her first steeplechase of the 2012 season, Coburn became the fourth-fastest American in history and the fastest American on US soil with her time of 9:25.28. The time was a 12-second PR (personal record) for Coburn.

She qualified for the 2012 London Olympic Games in the 3000-meters steeplechase, joined in the event by her University of Colorado teammate, Shalaya Kipp. At age 21, Coburn was the youngest runner on the 2012 US Olympic team. In her Olympic debut, she placed third in her preliminary heat with a time of 9:27.51, automatically qualifying for the final. She came in ninth in the final, with a time of 9:23.54 – a then personal best.

In 2013, Coburn returned to the University of Colorado as a fifth-year senior. She was named the PAC-12 Track Athlete of the Week on April 30, 2013, after recording the best 3000-meters steeplechase time in the world for the season. On June 8, 2013, at the NCAA Championships at Hayward Field in Eugene, Oregon, Coburn ran the final race of her career where she would claim her second NCAA steeplechase title with a winning time of 9:35.38, finishing three seconds ahead of Florida State's Colleen Quigley.

== Professional career ==
=== 2013 ===
Following the completion of her collegiate career, Coburn announced that she was becoming a professional runner and, in June 2013, signed a contract with New Balance. Shortly after, she announced that she had a sacral stress fracture that would cause her miss the 2013 Moscow World Championships and require her to sit out the 2013 professional track season. The injury occurred during her final collegiate race.

=== 2014 ===
In 2014, Coburn improved her 3000-meters steeplechase best four times. On May 18, at the Shanghai Diamond League meeting, she ran 9:19.81, earning her first Diamond League victory, before improving to 9:17.84 for third at the Prefontaine Classic in Eugene which was held on May 31. Four weeks later, Coburn ran 9:19.72 to win her third US title in Sacramento. On July 5, at the Paris Diamond League, she ran a 9:14.12 for a second-place finish. This moved her to second on the US all-time list behind Jenny Simpson. One week later, on July 12 at the Glasgow Diamond League in Scotland, she broke Simpson's American record of 9:12.51 by running 9:11.42 and finishing second in the race to Ethiopian Hiwot Ayalew. After that she ran two Diamond Discipline events finishing fifth in Stockholm in 9:20.31 and fifth in Zurich in 9:23.89. On September 14, Coburn topped off her most successful steeplechase season to-date winning the IAAF Continental Cup in Marrakesh, Morocco where she finished ahead of Ayalew, the world's number one steeplechase runner in 2014. Bahrain's Ruth Jebet finished third.

=== 2015 ===
In 2015, Coburn's indoor mile ranked 28th in the world. Coburn ran an Olympic qualifying time (1500m) of 4:05.1 in Eugene, Oregon, at the Prefontaine meet in May. She won the steeplechase at the USATF Championships to qualify for the 2015 World Championships in Athletics, where she placed fifth.

=== 2016: Rio Olympic bronze medalist ===
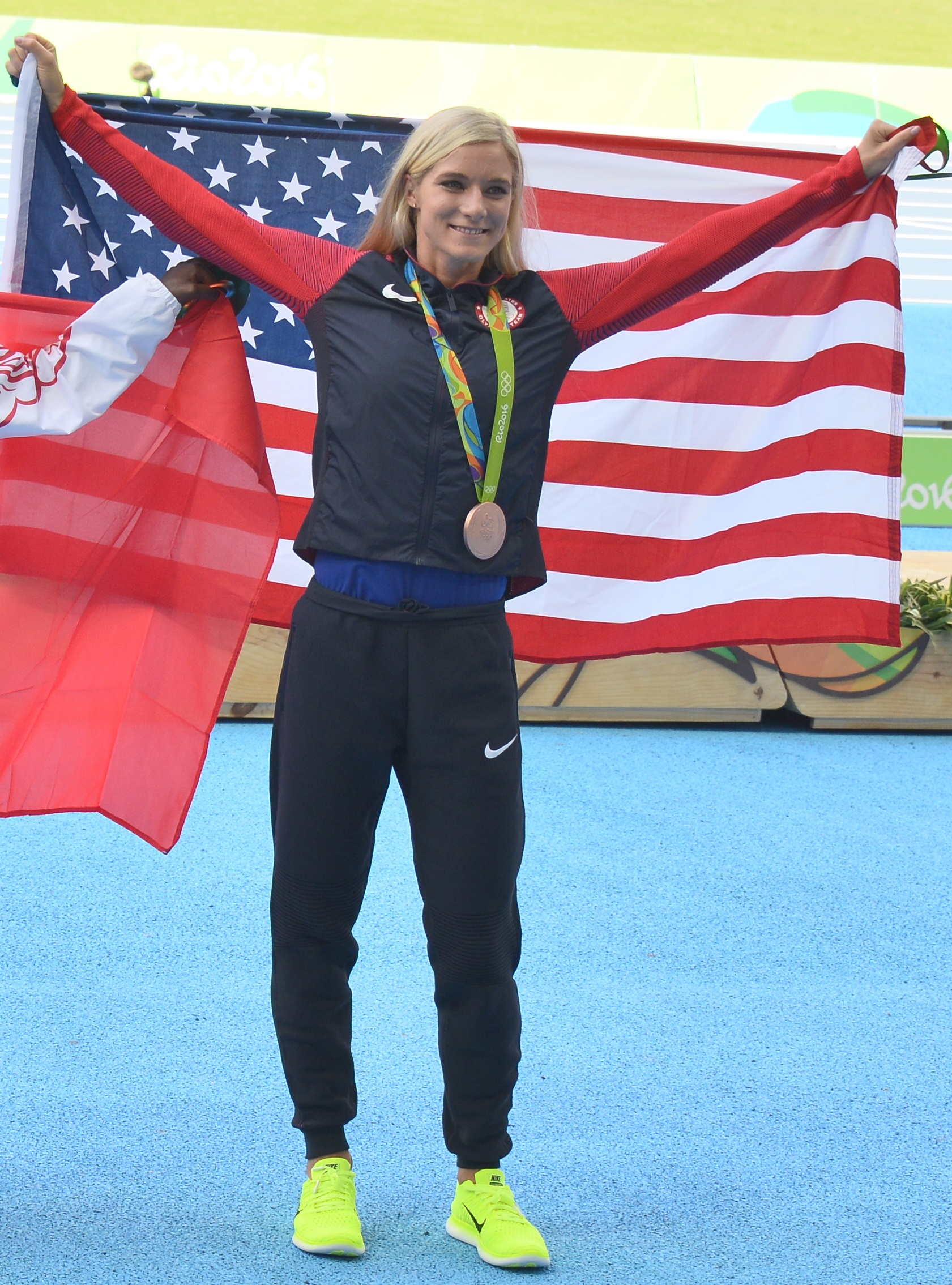
Coburn celebrates her bronze medal at the 2016 Rio Olympics.

In 2016, Coburn opened her outdoor season running 4:06.92 in the 1500 meters at Hoka One One Middle Distance Classic hosted at Occidental College. She set a new American record shortly thereafter at the Prefontaine Classic in Eugene, where she ran 9:10.76 in the 3000 meters steeplechase. Coburn broke the American record for the third time, earning bronze in 9:07.63 in the 2016 Olympic steeplechase and becoming the first American woman to win an Olympic medal in the 3000 meters steeplechase.

On December 2, 2016, Coburn announced on her Twitter account that she was ending training with coaches Heather Burroughs and Mark Wetmore after "an amazing 8 years." She later began coaching under Joe Bashaard, her then-fiancé.

=== 2017: World champion ===
In January, Coburn, along with Sydney McLaughlin, Brenda Martinez, and Jenny Simpson set a world-best time of 10:40.31 in the Distance Medley Relay (DMR) at the 2017 New Balance Indoor Grand Prix at Boston's Reggie Lewis Center. Although news accounts reported it as "breaking a world record", the DMR was not recognized for world record sanctioning in 2017 by World Athletics because it was run on an indoor, banked track, rather than outdoors. Nevertheless, it was a remarkable feat with the US track community continuing to acknowledge it as a world record. Coburn ran the opening leg (1200m, 3:18.40), followed by Powell (400m, 52.32), then Martinez (800m, 2:01.94), with Simpson anchoring the team (1600m, 4:27.66). The previous best of 10:42.57 was run at this meeting in 2015 by the American team of Sarah Brown, Mahogany Jones, Megan Krumpoch, and Brenda Martinez.

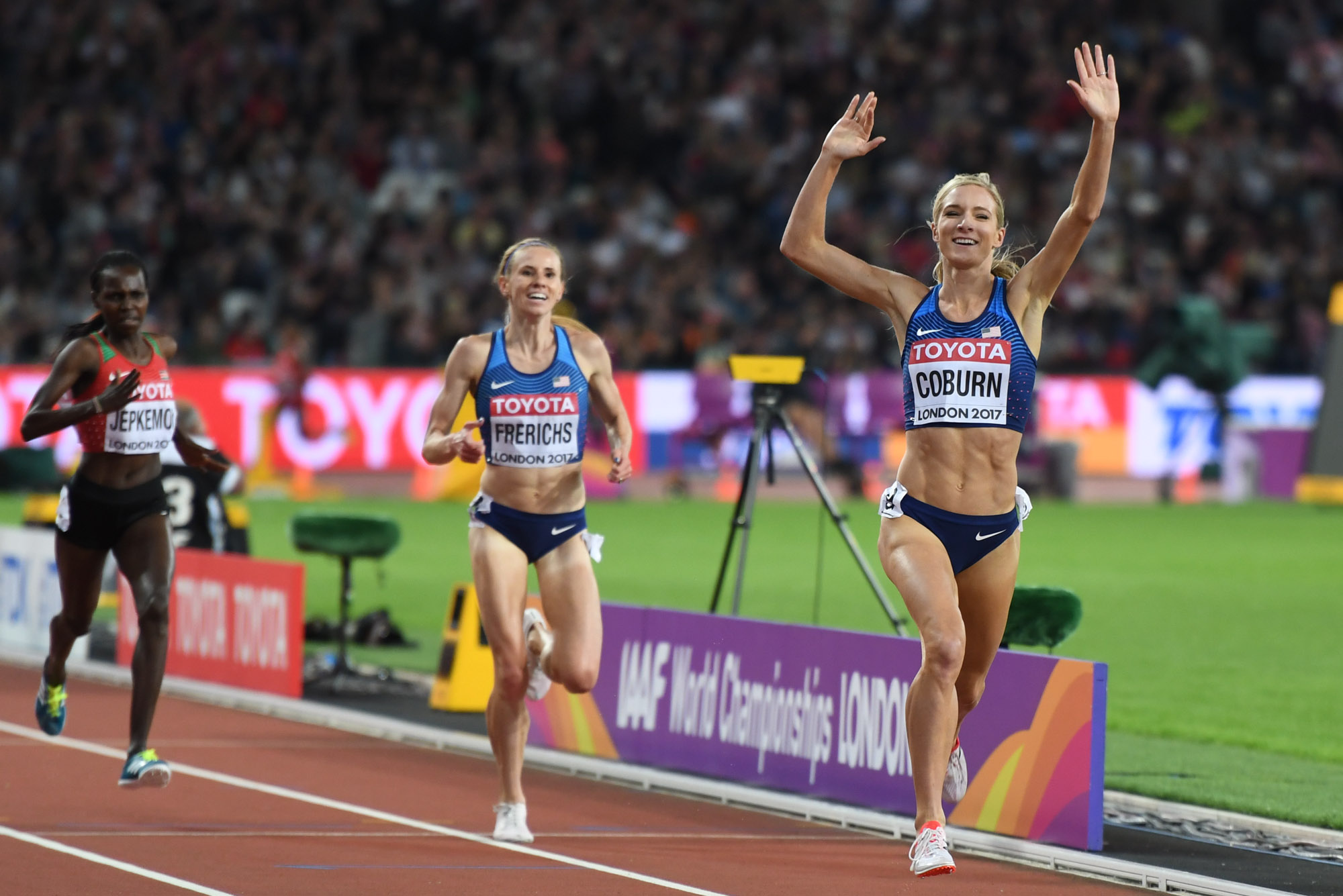
Emma Coburn (R) triumphs at the 2017 World Championships in Athletics in London.

On May 5, 2017, Coburn opened her outdoor season at the Doha Diamond League, racing the steeplechase in 9:14 to place fifth. She then took gold in the 2017 World Championships on August 11 in London. This championship made her the first American woman to win a gold medal in the steeplechase at either the World Championships or the Olympics. Four of the Kenyan-born women she beat in that race, including Olympic champion/world record holder Ruth Jebet had previously run faster than Coburn. Courtney Frerichs won a silver medal at the same event, thus making Coburn and Frerichs the first Americans to win the gold and silver medal in any individual World Championships or Olympics race longer than 400 meters since the 1912 Stockholm Games.

In November 2017, Coburn was named the winner of the prestigious Jackie Joyner-Kersee Award given annually by USATF to the top female athlete of the year, their highest accolade.

=== 2018 ===
In January 2018, Coburn opened her indoor season at Western State Colorado University, where she ran a then Colorado state record mile (at 7717 feet elevation) (since broken by Dani Jones on February 3, 2018, 4:36.05-mile in the University of Colorado's Indoor Practice Facility at 5430 feet elevation). Coburn followed her mile victory with a pair of 3000 meters races, first on February 3 at the Millrose Games in 8:41.16, a runner-up finish to teammate Aisha Praught-Leer who ran 8:41.10, and then at the New Balance Indoor Grand Prix on February 10, 2018, at the Reggie Lewis Center where her time of 8:43.57 placed fourth. Coburn finished 3rd in the 3000 meters at the 2018 USA Indoor Track and Field Championships behind winner Shelby Houlihan and runner-up Katie Mackey.

=== 2019: World silver medalist ===
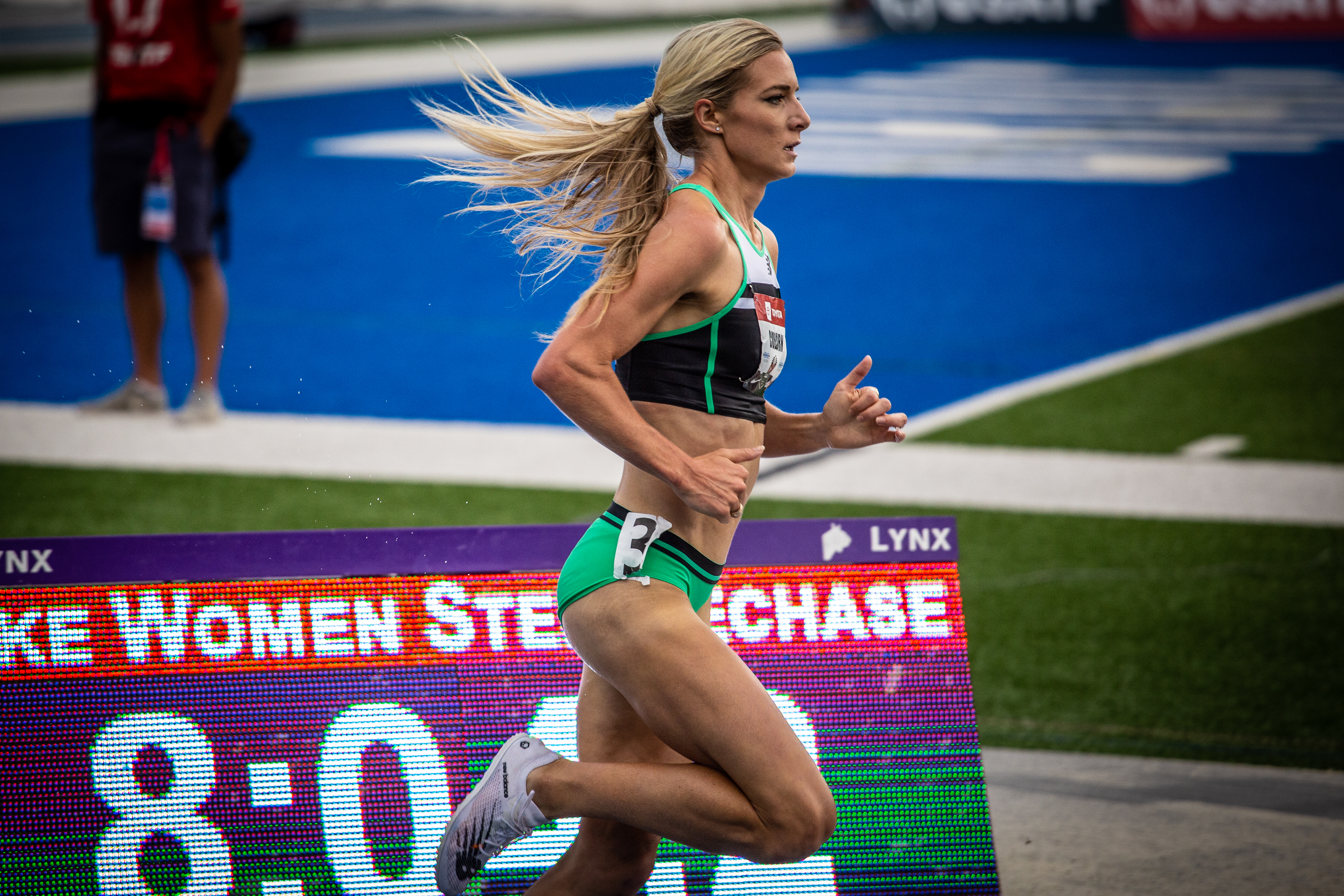
Coburn races at the 2019 USATF Championships.

On June 30, 2019, she ran 9:04.90 to place second behind world record-holder Beatrice Chepkoech in the steeplechase event at the Diamond League Prefontaine Classic held in Stanford, California. On July 28, Coburn ran 9:25.63 for first at the USATF Championships. Since she was the defending World Champion from 2017, she already was an automatic qualifier for the 2019 World Championships. Second was the U.S. record-holder Courtney Frerichs, who ran 9:26.61, and also qualified to run in Doha, Qatar in September. At the Worlds, Coburn won the silver medal with a personal record of 9:02.35 while Frerichs finished sixth.

=== 2020 ===
Coburn opened her 2020 season on January 25 at the New Balance Indoor Grand Prix, finishing third in the two-mile race in 9:32.81. At the same event she also ran in a 3000-meters split-time event posting a time of 8:56.60. In March, Coburn finished fourth with a time of 1:25:37 at the Kaiser Permanente Napa Valley half marathon.

=== 2021 ===
In June 2021, Coburn qualified for her third Olympic Games by finishing first in the 3000 meters steeplechase at the US Olympic Trials in Eugene, OR with a winning time of 9:09:41. At the postponed Tokyo Olympics she placed 14th in the final held on August 4, 2021; however, on the bell lap she clipped a barrier causing her to tumble off the track. She was later disqualified for touching the track's delimiting railing when she fell.

=== 2022 ===
During June 24-26th she competed in the steeplechase at the USATF Championship where she ran 9:10.63 finishing first and capturing her 10th national title. During a post-race interview Coburn became emotional when asked to reflect upon which national championship was her favorite. Coburn stated that perhaps the 10th title is her most favorite because it made up for a deeply disappointing performance at the Tokyo Olympic Games and because she was unsure how many more races she would be able to enjoy with her mother, who has been battling cancer.

From July 16-20th, Coburn competed in her fifth World Athletics Championships held in Eugene, Oregon, finishing eighth in the 3000-meters steeplechase final in 9:16.49.

Following the World Championships, in August and September, she ran three Diamond Discipline steeplechase events. She finished fourth in Monaco posting a time of 9:07.93; eighth in Brussels with a run of 9:14.43; and seventh in Zürich final with a time of 9:20.00.

On September 11, 2022, the 31-year-old ran in the New Balance 5th Avenue Mile in New York City finishing in 4:22.8, placing her 10th amongst the women professional runners, first in her age category (31–34) and 59th overall (both men and women). Great Britain's Laura Muir ran 4:14.8 to capture the win.

=== 2023 ===
On February 4, Coburn opened her 2023 season competing in the women's mile at the New Balance Indoor Grand Prix. Starting in the outside alley, she finished seventh with a personal best time of 4:28.84, eclipsing her previous best of 4:29.86 which she set during her collegiate career in 2013. Coburn also posted an indoor personal best for the 1500 meters with her split of 4:10.39 en route.

On February 18, she joined Team USA and traveled to Bathurst, Australia to participate in the World Cross Country Championships. Coburn, along with Alec Basten, Jordan Mann, and Heather MacLean formed Team USA's mixed relay team, which finished fifth in 24:32. Coburn ran the second leg in the race and improved Team USA's overall position from tenth to fifth position by finishing her leg in 6:13. It was the first time since college that Coburn ran in a team event. The race was won by Team Kenya in 23:14, with Ethiopia taking silver in 23:21 and Australia earning the bronze medal in 23:26. While still in Australia, on February 23, Coburn competed in the 1500 m at the Maurie Plant Meet – Melbourne, where she ran a 4:10.96 to finish fifth.

=== 2024 ===
While going over a water jump at the 2024 Shanghai Diamond League, Coburn sustained torn ligaments, damaged cartilage, and a fractured medial maleolus. The injury required surgery and Coburn was unable to compete at the Olympic Trials, where she had hoped to qualify for her fourth Olympics.

== Achievements ==
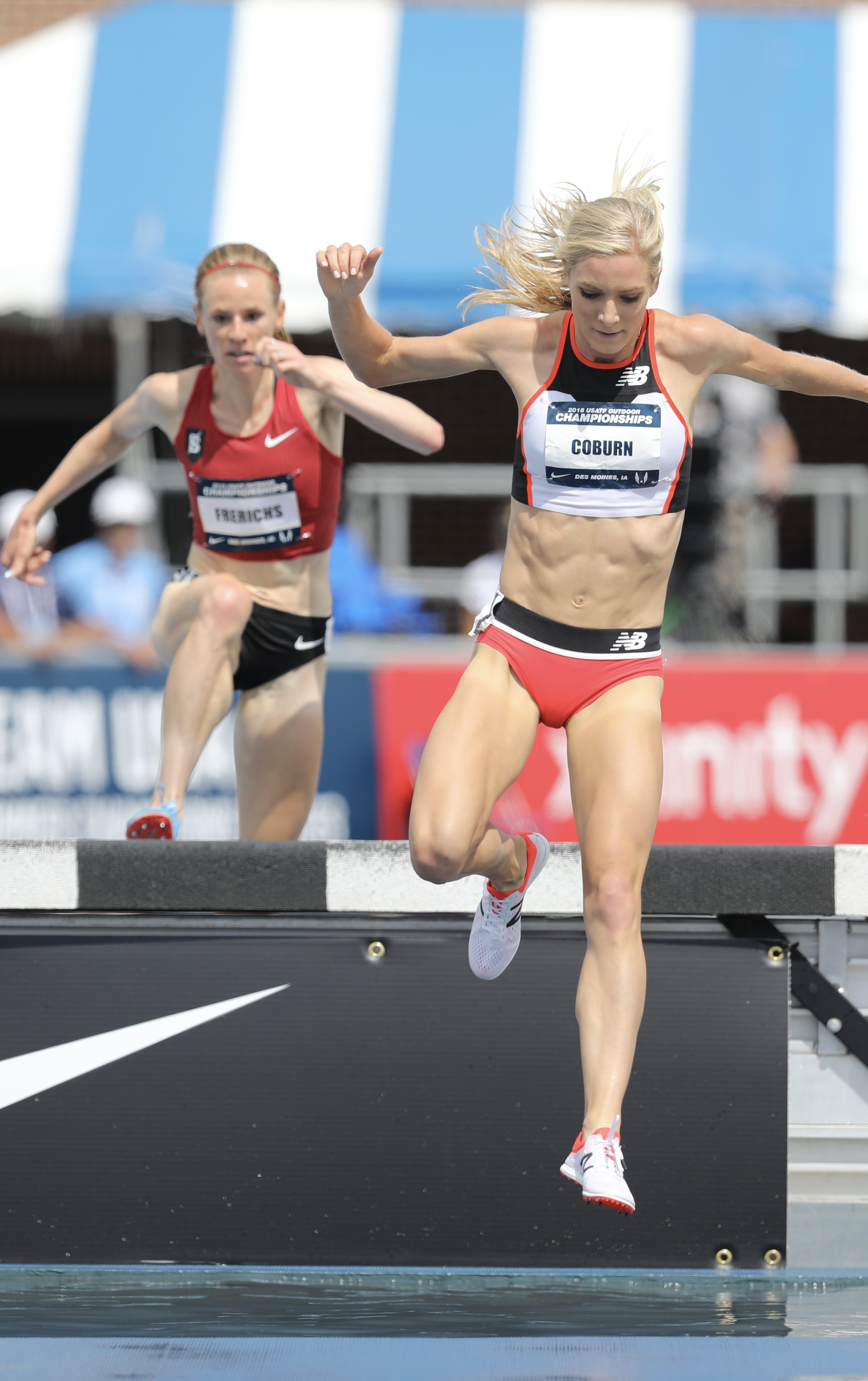
Emma Coburn (R) races at the 2018 USATF Championships.

All sourced from World Athletics profile unless otherwise noted. As of February 4, 2023.

=== International competitions ===
Representing the United States
Year	Competition	Venue	Position	Event	Time
2011	World Championships	Daegu, South Korea	8th	3000 m s'chase	9:51.40
2012	Olympic Games	London, United Kingdom	8th	3000 m s'chase	9:23.54
2015	World Championships	Beijing, China	5th	3000 m s'chase	9:21.78
2016	Olympic Games	Rio de Janeiro, Brazil	3rd	3000 m s'chase	9:07.63
2017	World Championships	London, United Kingdom	1st	3000 m s'chase	9:02.58 CR
2019	World Championships	Doha, Qatar	2nd	3000 m s'chase	9:02.35 PR
2021	Olympic Games	Tokyo, Japan	~~14th~~ DQ	3000 m s'chase	~~9:41.50~~
2022	World Championships	Eugene, OR, United States	8th	3000 m s'chase	9:16.49
2023	World Championships	Budapest, Hungary	28th (h)	3000 m s'chase	9:41.52

=== National championships ===
Year	Competition	Venue	Position	Event	Notes
2011	USATF Championships	Eugene, Oregon	1st	3000 m s'chase	9:44.11
2012	US Olympic Trials	Eugene, Oregon	1st	3000 m s'chase	9:32.78
2014	USATF Championships	Sacramento, California	1st	3000 m s'chase	9:19.72
2015	USATF Championships	Eugene, Oregon	1st	3000 m s'chase	9:15.59
2016	US Olympic Trials	Eugene, Oregon	1st	3000 m s'chase	9:17.48
2017	USATF Championships	Sacramento, California	1st	3000 m s'chase	9:20.28
2018	USATF Indoor Championships	Albuquerque, New Mexico	3rd	3000 m	9:01.85
2018	USATF Championships	Des Moines, Iowa	1st	3000 m s'chase	9:17.70
2019	USATF Championships	Des Moines, Iowa	1st	3000 m s'chase	9:25.63
2021	US Olympic Trials	Eugene, Oregon	1st	3000 m s'chase	9:09.41
2022	USATF Championships	Eugene, Oregon	1st	3000 m s'chase	9:10.63

=== Personal bests ===
Surface	Event	Time (m):s	Date	Location
Outdoor track	800 metres	2:01.10	August 22, 2020	Los Angeles, CA
Outdoor track	1500 metres	4:03.82	August 15, 2020	Memphis, Tennessee
Outdoor track	Mile	4:31.08	September 5, 2018	Bay Shore, New York
Outdoor track	3000 metres	8:48.60	August 20, 2017	Birmingham
Outdoor track	5000 metres	15:24.76	February 27, 2021	Austin, TX
Outdoor track	2000 m steeplechase	6:44.42	June 19, 2008	Greensboro, North Carolina
Outdoor track	3000 m steeplechase	9:02.35	September 30, 2019	Doha, Qatar
Indoor track	1000 metres	2:52.43	February 27, 2009	College Station, TX
Indoor track	1500 metres	4:10.39	February 4, 2023	Boston, Massachusetts
Indoor track	Mile	4:28.84	February 4, 2023	Boston, Massachusetts
Indoor track	2000 metres	5:41.11	February 7, 2015	Boston, Massachusetts
Indoor track	3000 metres	8:39.19	February 13, 2021	New York, New York
Indoor track	Two Miles	9:15.71	February 13, 2021	New York, New York
Indoor track	Distance Medley Relay	10:40.31	January 28, 2017	Boston, Massachusetts
Road	Mile	4:20.3	September 9, 2018	New York, New York

=== Season bests ===
Surface	Event	2017	2018	2019	2020	2021	2022	2023
Outdoor track	800 m	—	—	—	2:01.10	—	—	
Outdoor track	1500 m	4:11.89	—	4:04.40	4:03.82	4:04.28	4:04.44	
Outdoor track	Mile	—	4:31.08	—	4:32.72	—	—	
Outdoor track	3000 m	8:48.60	—	—	—	—	—	
Outdoor track	5000 m	—	—	—	—	15:24.76	—	
Outdoor track	3000 m s'chase	9:02.58	9:05.06	9:02.35	—	9:08.22	9:07.93	
Indoor track	1500 m	—	—	4:14.39	—	—	—	4:10.39
Indoor track	Mile	—	—	4:32.68	—	—	—	4:28.84
Indoor track	3000 m	—	8:41.16	8:52.27	8:56.60	8:39.19	—	—
Indoor track	Two Miles	—	—	—	9:32.81	9:15.71	—	—

== Personal life ==
In 2016, Coburn posed nude for ESPN's The Body Issue magazine.

In October 2017, Coburn married her longtime boyfriend, Joe Bosshard, who had also begun coaching her earlier that year. The couple announced the birth of their daughter, Betty Ann Bosshard, born via surrogate, in October 2024.

Coburn founded the annual Elk Run 5k, a fundraising effort for the Crested Butte Cancer Support Community.
