= 2017 Asian Athletics Championships – Women's 3000 metres steeplechase =

The women's 3000 metres steeplechase at the 2017 Asian Athletics Championships was held on 8 July.

== Results ==
Rank	Name	Nationality	Time	Notes
1st place, gold medalist(s)	Sudha Singh	India	9:59.47	
2nd place, silver medalist(s)	Hyo Gyong	North Korea	10:13.94	
3rd place, bronze medalist(s)	Nana Sato	Japan	10:18.11	
4	Parul Chaudhary	India	10:22.99	
5	Li Yuanfeng	China	10:36.42	
	Uda Kuburalage Nilani	Sri Lanka	DNF	

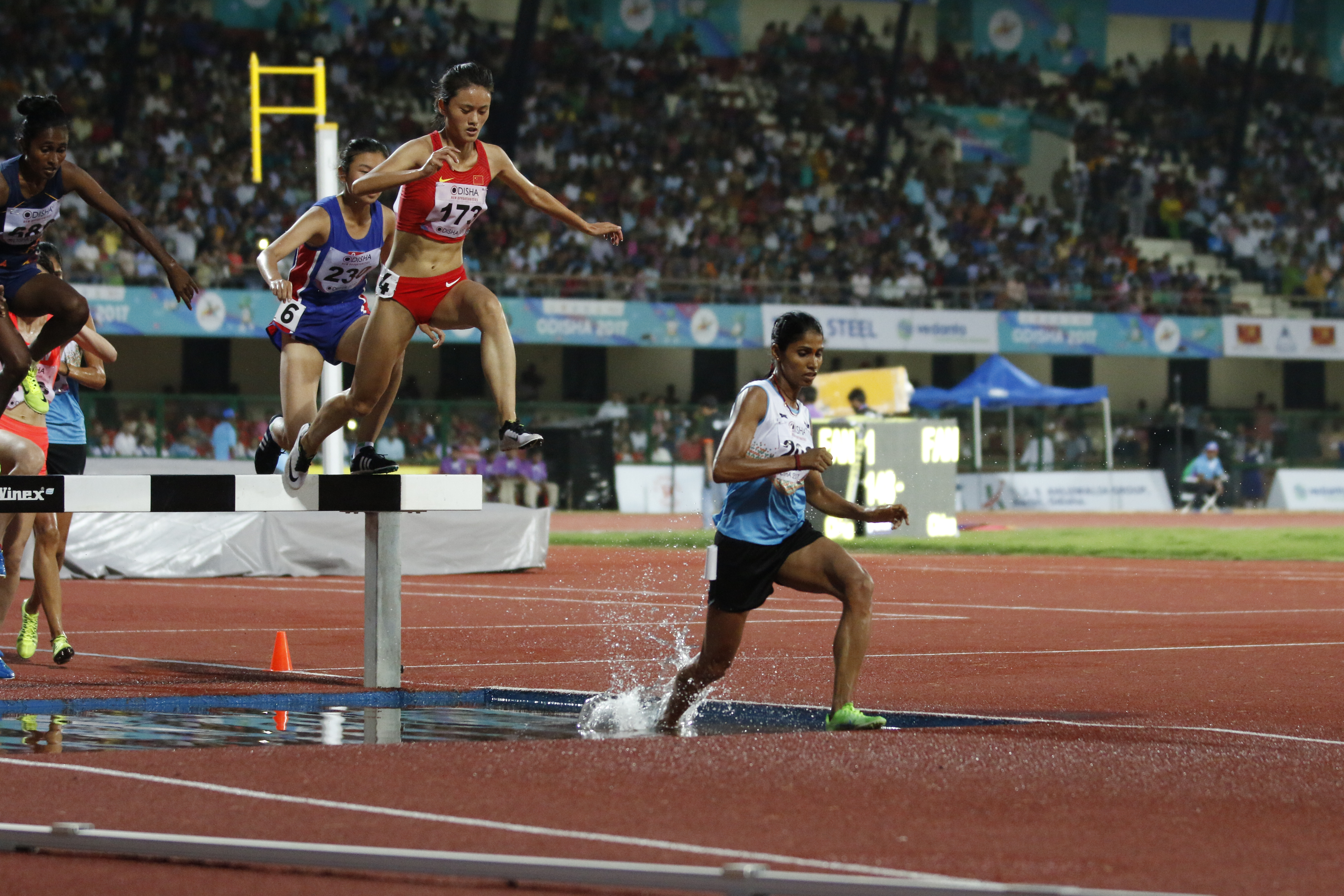
The race underway
