= Lalita Babar =

Indian long-distance runner

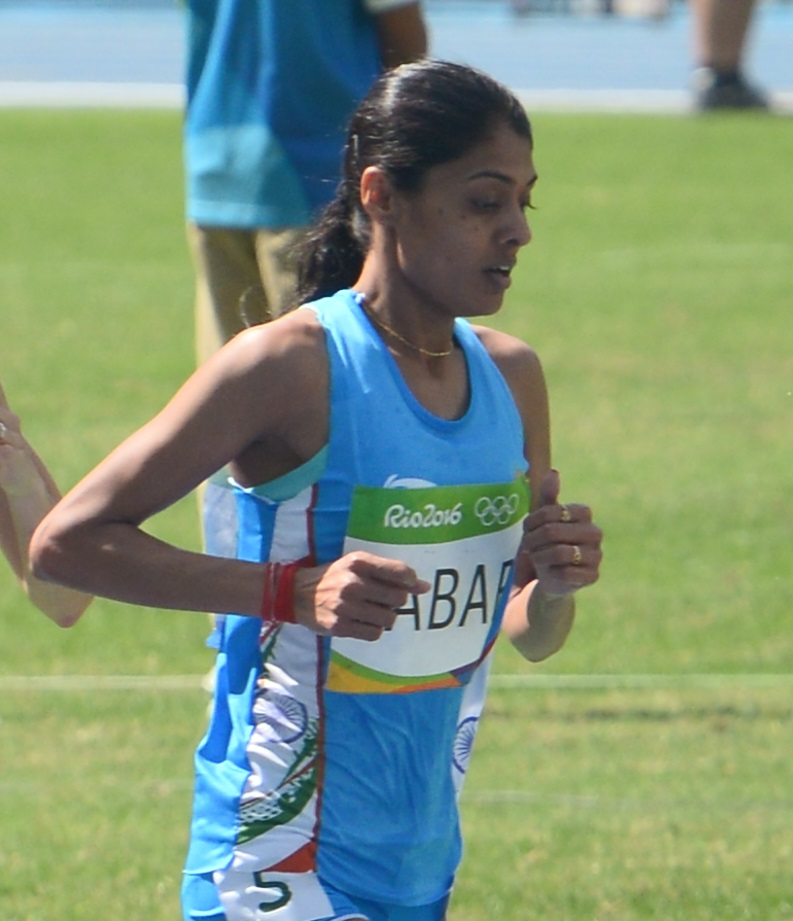
- Lalita Babar at the 2016 Olympics

Personal information
- Full name: Lalita Shivaji Babar
- Nationality: Indian
- Born: 2 June 1989 (age 37) Mohi, Satara, Maharashtra, India
- Height: 1.66 m (5 ft 5 1/2 in)
- Weight: 50 kg (110 lb)

Sport
- Sport: Track and field
- Event: 3000 metres steeplechase

Achievements and titles
- Personal best: 9:19.76 (Rio de Janeiro 2016)
Medal record
Women's athletics
Representing India
Asian Games
Bronze medal – third place	2014 Incheon	3000 m steeplechase
Asian Championships
Gold medal – first place	2015 Wuhan	3000 m steeplechase
- Updated on 1 June 2025

Lalita Babar (born 2 June 1989) is a former Indian long-distance runner. She was born in a small village in the Satara district, Maharashtra. She predominantly competed in the 3000 metres steeplechase event. Babar was named as the Sports Person of the Year in the India Sports Awards 2015 organised by Federation of Indian Chambers of Commerce and Industry (FICCI) and the Ministry of Youth Affairs and Sports of India.

== Early life and junior career ==
Babar was born on 2 June 1989 in Mohi, a village in Satara district, in the Indian State of Maharashtra into a family of farmers. She was born in an area which was regularly affected by droughts, which adversely affects the agriculture in the area.

Babar started her career in athletics as a long-distance runner at a young age. She won her first gold medal in the U-20 National Championships at Pune in 2005.

== Career ==
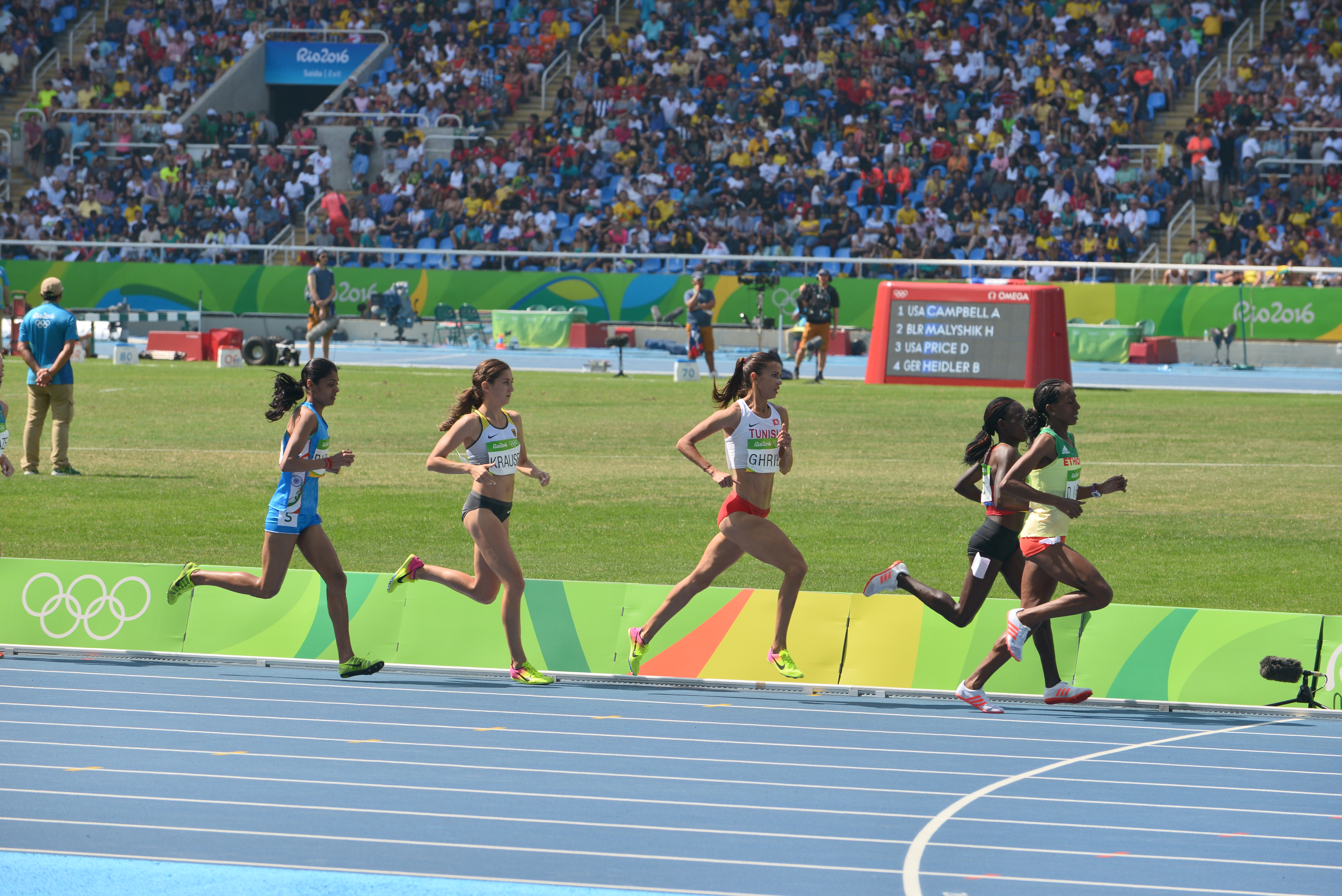
Babbar (first from left) during the 2016 Summer Olympics women's 3000 metres steeplechase final.

Babar began her career in track and field athletics as a long-distance runner.

In 2014, she became the hat-trick winner of the Mumbai Marathon. Determined to win a medal in multi-discipline events like the Asian Games and Commonwealth Games, she switched to 3000 metres steeplechase in January 2014, following her win at the marathon. At the 2014 Asian Games in Incheon, South Korea, she won the bronze medal clocking 9:35.37 in the final. In the process, she broke the national record held by Sudha Singh.

At the 2015 Asian Championships, Babar won the gold medal clocking 9:34.13 and broke her own personal record, the Indian national record and the games record. In the process, she qualified for the 2016 Summer Olympics. She also qualified for 2016 Summer Olympic in Marathon with her personal best of 2:38:21 at Mumbai Marathon 2015. She went on to break the record again at the 2015 World Championships in Beijing with a time of 9:27.86 in her qualifying heat. Being the first Indian woman to qualify for the steeplechase final, she placed eighth in the final.

In April 2016, she again bettered the national record with a time of 9:27.09 at the Federation Cup National Athletics Championships in New Delhi. At the Rio de Janeiro Summer Olympics, she bettered it with a time of 9:19.76 in her heat, qualifying to the final, and in the process became the first Indian in 32 years to enter a final in any track event. At the final, she finished 10th with a time of 9:22.74.

== Competition record ==
Year	Competition	Venue	Position	Event	Notes
Representing India
2014	Asian Games	Incheon, South Korea	3rd	3000 metres steeplechase	9:35.37
2015	Asian Championships	Wuhan, China	1st	3000 metres steeplechase	9:34.13
2015	World Championships	Beijing, China	8th	3000 metres steeplechase	9:29.64
2016	Olympic Games	Rio de Janeiro, Brazil	10th	3000 metres steeplechase	9:22.74

== Awards ==
Sports Person of the Year Awards (2015), FICCI and Ministry of Youth Affairs and Sports

India Sports Awards (2015), by FICCI and Ministry of Youth Affairs and Sports

Arjuna Award, by Government of India
