= Colleen Quigley =

American middle- and long-distance runner

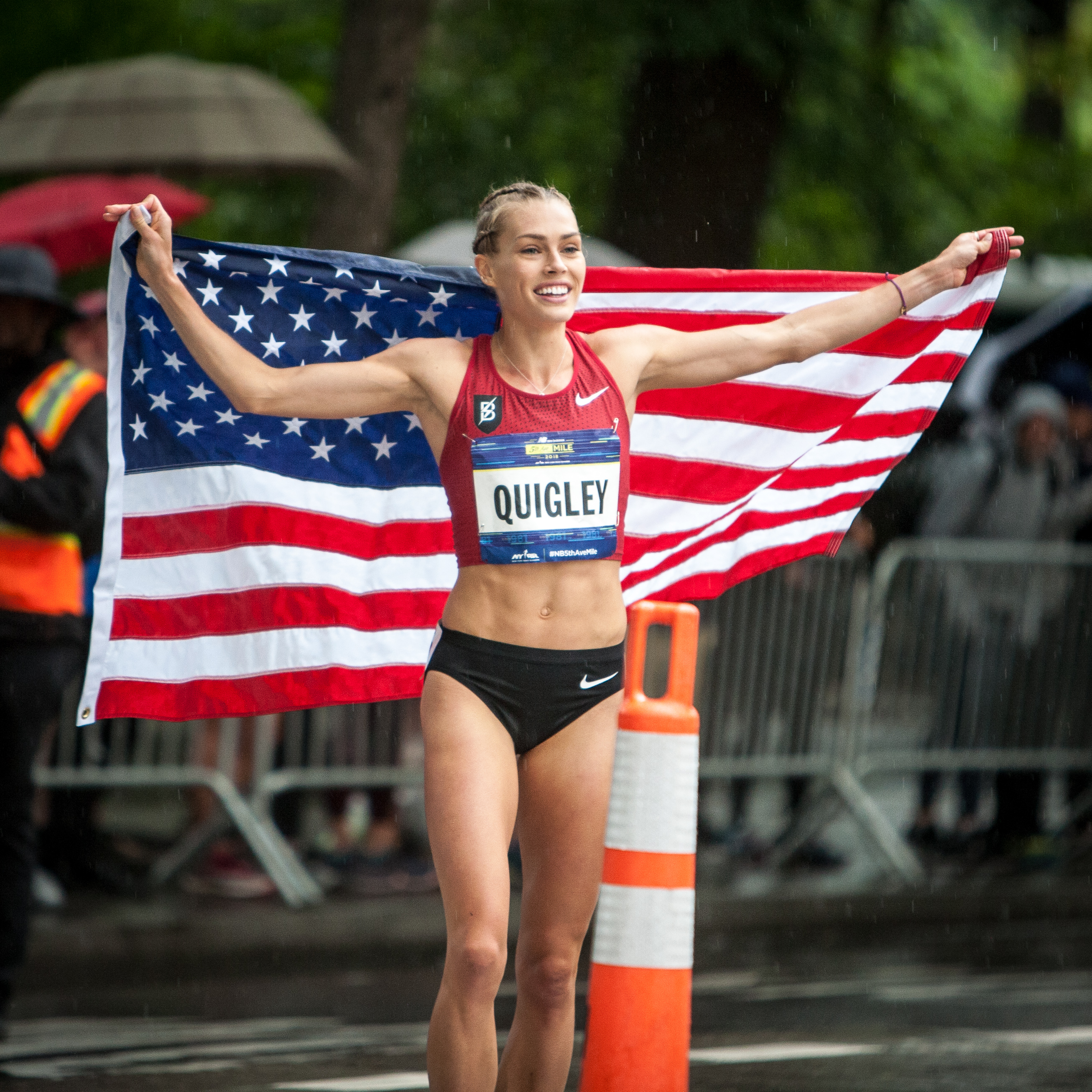
- Quigley after her second-place finish at the 2018 Fifth Avenue Mile

Personal information
- Born: November 20, 1992 (age 33) St. Louis, Missouri, U.S.
- Height: 5 ft 8 in (1.73 m)
- Weight: 134 lb (61 kg)

Sport
- Sport: Track and field
- Events: Steeplechase, 1500 meters, Mile
- College team: Florida State University Seminoles
- Turned pro: 2015

Achievements and titles
- Olympic finals: 2016; 3000 m s'chase, 8th
- World finals: 2015; 3000 m s'chase, 12th 2017; 3000 m s'chase, DQ (13th) (h); 2019; 3000 m s'chase, DNS
- Personal bests: Outdoor; 800 m: 2:02.98 (Portland 2020); 1500 m: 4:03.02 (Chorzów 2018); 3000 m: 8:40.23 (Phoenix 2021); 5000 m: 15:10.42 (Portland 2020); 3000 m s'chase: 9:10.27 (Berlin 2018); Indoor; 1500 m: 4:06.16i+ (New York 2019); Mile: 4:22.86i (New York 2019); 3000 m: 8:28.71i (Boston 2020); Road; Mile: 4:19.2a (New York 2018)

Colleen Quigley (born November 20, 1992) is an American middle-distance runner, steeplechase specialist, and Olympian from St. Louis, Missouri. She is a current world record–holder in the 4x1500-meter relay (set July 31, 2020). Competing in the 3000-meter steeplechase, she finished 8th at the 2016 Summer Olympics in Rio and 12th at the 2015 World Championships in Athletics in Beijing. She won the 2019 U.S. National Indoor Championship in the mile, running 4:29.47, and was the 2015 NCAA Champion in the 3000-meter steeplechase. In 2023, Quigley announced that she would start competing in triathlon events, but that she still plans to compete in track and field through 2024.

== Professional ==
Quigley signed professionally with the Bowerman Track Club in June 2015. Later that year, she finished third in the steeplechase in 9:24.92 at the 2015 USA Outdoor Track and Field Championships, and finished 12th in the 3000 metres steeplechase event at the 2015 World Championships in Athletics in Beijing, China.

She ran 9:20.00 to place ninth in the Diamond League event, Meeting de Paris, 2016. Prior to that, Quigley had run a personal best time of 9:21.10 to place eighth in the 3000 metres steeplechase at the 2016 Summer Olympics. Quigley had also run a personal best time of 9:21.29 to place third in the steeplechase behind Team USA teammates Emma Coburn and Courtney Frerichs at the 2016 United States Olympic Trials to qualify to represent the United States at the 2016 Summer Olympics. On September 3, 2018, she lowered her steeplechase personal record to 9:10.27, winning at ISTASF in Berlin and becoming the third-fastest American woman ever at the time.

On June 30, 2019, she ran 9:11.41 to place seventh, and third American, in the star-studded Diamond League steeplechase at the Prefontaine Classic in Stanford, California.

At the 2019 USA Indoor Track and Field Championships, she finished first in the mile in 4:29.27.

On February 27, 2020, Quigley ran a personal best of 8:28.71 in the 3000 meters at Boston University in a race among her Bowerman Track Club teammates Karissa Schweizer and Shelby Houlihan. This was faster than the previous American Record at this distance, 8:33.25 by Shalane Flanagan, but Quigley finished third behind her two teammates, who also broke the record.

In a Bowerman Track Club inter-squad meet on July 31, 2020, Quigley competed as a member of the 4x1500-meter relay team along with Elise Cranny, Karissa Schweizer, and Shelby Houlihan. The team ran a time of 16:27.02, which broke the previous world record of 16:33.58, held by Team Kenya, by over 6 seconds.

Quigley announced on February 4, 2021, that she would be leaving Bowerman Track Club and coach Jerry Schumacher to be coached by her former Florida State University coach Josh Seitz.

On February 11, 2023, Quigley participated in her first triathlon at the Tritonman draft-legal development race in San Diego, California, finishing first in the overall sprint course.

== NCAA ==
Colleen Quigley earned nine NCAA All-American honors while running for Florida State University.

She placed twelfth at the 2012 NCAA Women's Division I Cross Country Championship national championships and earned a silver medal at 2012 NCAA Women's Division I Cross Country Championship Regional championships. She placed fourth at the 2013 NCAA Women's Division I Cross Country Championship Atlantic Coast Conference cross country running. She won the 2013 NCAA Women's Division I Cross Country Championship University of Louisville Cardinals Pre-national Invitational and won the 2012 Notre Dame Fighting Irish Invitational title. She placed 4th at the Virginia Tech Hokies Invitational.

Quigley earned fifth place at 2012 NCAA Division I NCAA Outdoor Women's Track and Field Championship steeplechase. She earned a silver medal at 2012 NCAA Division I Atlantic Coast Conference Outdoor Track Steeplechase final. She earned fourth place at 2012 NCAA Division I Atlantic Coast Conference Indoor Track Mile Run title.

She placed sixth at 2013 NCAA Women's Division I Cross Country Championship national championships, the 2013 NCAA Women's Division I Cross Country Championship Regional cross country running title. She earned silver medal 2013 NCAA Women's Division I Cross Country Championship Atlantic Coast Conference cross country running. She won 2013 NCAA Women's Division I Cross Country Championship Florida State Seminoles Invitational and earned Notre Dame Fighting Irish, Wake Forest Demon Deacons, Appalachian State Mountaineers Invitational silver medals.

Quigley earned 2013 NCAA Division I NCAA Outdoor Women's Track and Field Championship Steeplechase silver medal.

In the 2014 NCAA Women's Division I Cross Country Championship, Quigley was awarded the competition's regional title, the Atlantic Coast Conference silver medal and Outdoor Track Steeplechase title, as well as the Virginia Tech Hokies Invitational and Lehigh Mountain Hawks Invitational titles.

In the same year, Quigley won the Division I Alabama Crimson Tide Invitational 1500 meters title, the NCAA Division I Florida State Seminoles Invitational Steeplechase title, the Division I Atlantic Coast Conference Indoor Track Mile run title, the NCAA Division I Washington Huskies Classic Distance medley relay title, and the NCAA Division I Indoor Track University of New Mexico Invitational 800 meters title.

The following year, Quigley won the 2015 NCAA Women's Division I Outdoor Track and Field Championships Steeplechase titleand. the 2015 NCAA Division I Atlantic Coast Conference Outdoor Track 1500 meters title.

Quigley earned 2015 NCAA Division I NCAA Indoor Women's Track and Field Championships Mile run bronze medal. She won 2015 NCAA Division I Atlantic Coast Conference Indoor Track Mile run and Distance medley relay titles. She won Boston University Terriers Invitational Mile run in a FSU record 4:29.67 and Distance medley relay titles. She won Auburn Tigers Invitational Mile run title.

== High school ==
Quigley attended Nerinx Hall High School. She earned the 2010-11 Missouri Girls track and field Gatorade Player of the Year award. In 2011, she captured state titles in the 3200 meters and 1600 meters at the Outdoor Missouri High School Athletic Association Class 4 State Meet. Quigley finished 20th at 2010 Footlocker Cross Country Championships. During high school, her father, Gaylerd Quigley, was her cross country coach.
