= Anju Takamizawa =

Japanese athletics competitor

Personal information
- Born: 6 March 1996 (age 29)
- Height: 1.65 m (5 ft 5 in)
- Weight: 51 kg (112 lb)

Sport
- Sport: Athletics
- Event: 3000 m steeplechase

Anju Takamizawa (高見澤 安珠, Takamizawa Anju; born 6 March 1996) is a Japanese athlete competing in the 3000 metres steeplechase. She represented her country at the 2016 Summer Olympics, but did not qualify for the final.

== International competitions ==
Year	Competition	Venue	Position	Event	Notes
Representing Japan
2015	Asian Championships	Wuhan, China	5th	3000 m s'chase	10:47.07
2016	Asian Indoor Championships	Doha, Qatar	4th	3000 m	9:44.58
2016	Olympic Games	Rio de Janeiro, Brazil	49th (h)	3000 m s'chase	9:58.59

== Personal bests ==
Outdoor

- 1500 metres – 4:25.61 (Shibetsu 2015)
- 3000 metres steeplechase – 9:44.22 (Nagoya 2016)

Indoor

- 3000 metres – 9:44.58 (Doha 2016)
