= Tunisia at the 1983 World Championships in Athletics =

- Flag of Tunisia
- WA code: TUN

in Helsinki, Finland August 7–14, 1983
- Competitors: 4 (3 men and 1 woman) in 4 events
- Medals: Gold 0 Silver 0 Bronze 0 Total 0

World Championships in Athletics appearances
- 1983; 1987; 1991; 1993; 1995; 1997; 1999; 2001; 2003; 2005; 2007; 2009; 2011; 2013; 2015; 2017; 2019; 2022; 2023

Tunisia competed at the 1983 World Championships in Athletics in Helsinki, Finland, from August 7 to 14, 1983.

== Men ==
Track and road events

Athlete	Event	Heat		Semifinal		Final	
Athlete	Event	Result	Rank	Result	Rank	Result	Rank
Mohamed Alouini	800 metres	1:49.09	35	Did not advance			
Mohamed Neji Henkiri	1500 metres	3:45.90	37	Did not advance			
Féthi Baccouche	5000 metres	14:23.79	23 Q	14:19.64	28	Did not advance	

== Women ==
Field events

Athlete	Event	Qualification		Final	
Athlete	Event	Distance	Position	Distance	Position
Kawther Akremi	High jump	1.70	=31	Did not advance	
