= Tunisia at the 2019 World Athletics Championships =

Tunisia at the 2019 World Championships in Athletics
- WA code: TUN

in Doha
- Competitors: 5 (3 men and 2 women)

World Championships in Athletics appearances
- 1983; 1987; 1991; 1993; 1995; 1997; 1999; 2001; 2003; 2005; 2007; 2009; 2011; 2013; 2015; 2017; 2019; 2022; 2023

Tunisia competed at the 2019 World Athletics Championships in Doha, Qatar, from 27 September–6 October 2019.

== Result ==
Key

- Note–Ranks given for track events are for the entire round
- Q = Qualified for the next round
- q = Qualified for the next round as a fastest loser or, in field events, by position without achieving the qualifying target
- NR = National record
- GR = Games record
- PB = Personal best
- SB = Season best
- DNF = Did not finish
- DNS = Did not start
- NM = No mark
- N/A = Round not applicable for the event
- Bye = Athlete not required to compete in round

=== Men ===
Track and road events

Athlete	Event	Heat		Semifinal		Final	
Athlete	Event	Result	Rank	Result	Rank	Result	Rank
Abdessalem Ayouni	800 m	1:46.09	3 Q	1:45.80	7	Did not advance	
Mohamed Amine Touati	400 m hurdles	49.76	2 Q	49.14 PB	5	Did not advance	
Amor Ben Yahia	3000 m steeplechase	8:26.12	9	Did not advance			

=== Women ===
Track and road events

Athlete	Event	Heat		Semifinal		Final	
Athlete	Event	Result	Rank	Result	Rank	Result	Rank
Marwa Bouzayani	3000 m steeplechase	9:47.78	10	Did not advance			
Chahinez Nasri	20 km walk	—				DNF	
