= Ruth Jebet =

Bahraini steeplechase and long-distance runner of Kenyan descent

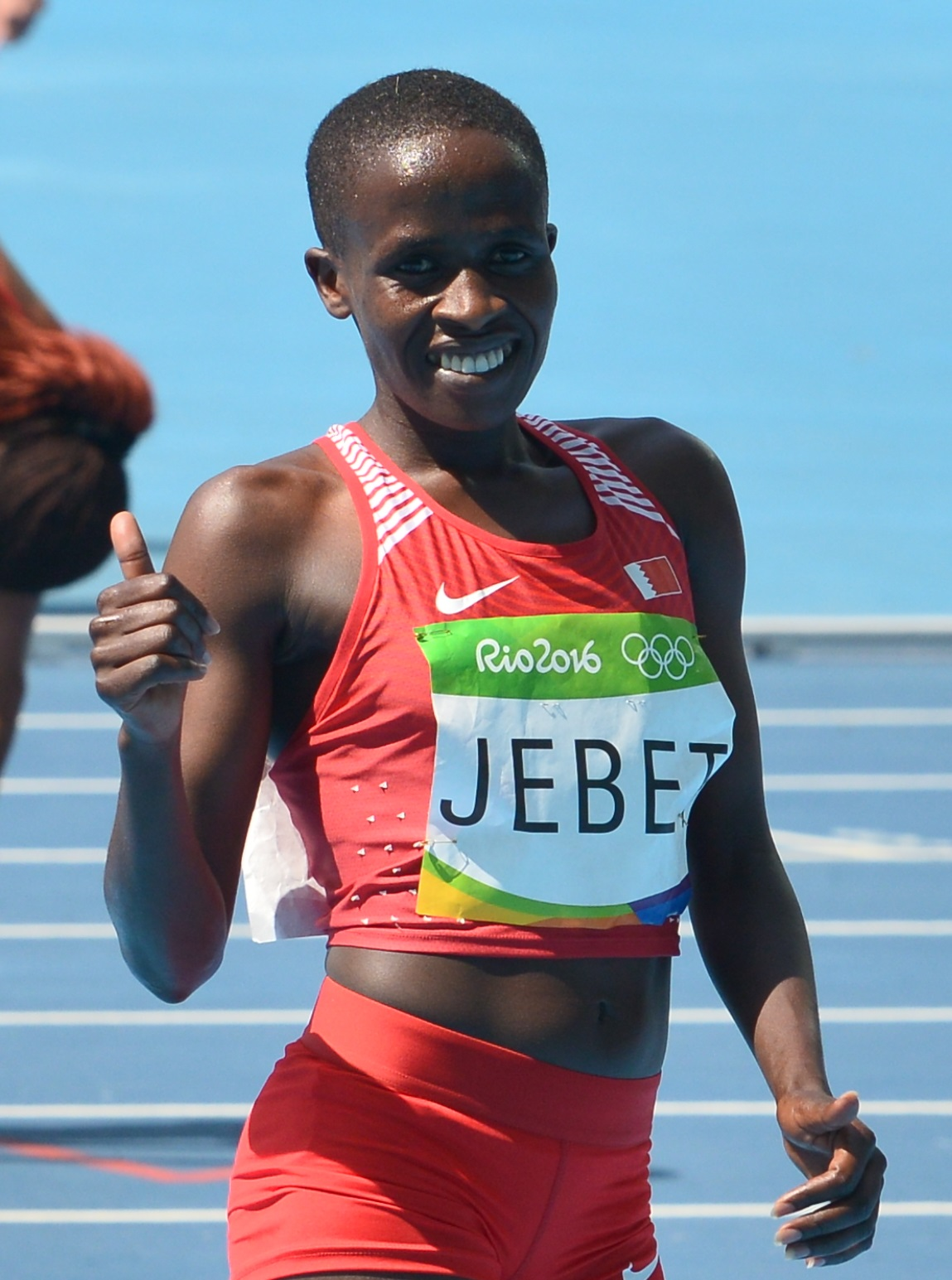
- Jebet at 2016 Olmypics

Personal information
- Nationality: Bahraini
- Born: 17 November 1996 (age 30) Kenya
- Height: 1.62 m (5 ft 4 in)
- Weight: 51 kg (112 lb)

Sport
- Sport: Track and field
- Event: Steeplechase

Achievements and titles
- Personal best: 3000 m steeplechase: 8:52.78
Medal record
Women's athletics
Representing Bahrain
Olympic Games
Gold medal – first place	2016 Rio de Janeiro	3000 m steeplechase
Asian Games
Gold medal – first place	2014 Incheon	3000 m steeplechase
Asian Championships
Gold medal – first place	2013 Pune	3000 m steeplechase
Asian Indoor Championships
Silver medal – second place	2016 Doha	3000 m
World Junior Championships
Gold medal – first place	2014 Oregon	3000 m steeplechase

Ruth Jebet (born 17 November 1996) is a Kenyan-born long-distance runner who competes internationally for Bahrain. Competing in the 3000m steeplechase, she was the 2016 Olympic champion and held the world record in the event from 2016 to 2018. In December 2017 she tested positive for EPO, receiving a four-year doping ban from 2018 to 2022.

== Career ==
Jebet took the opportunity to run for Bahrain at the age of sixteen, transferring her eligibility in February 2013. In April she won the 3000 metres and the 5000 metres at the Kenyan high school championships.

The teenager excelled in her debut outing for Bahrain, coming second in the 3000 metres steeplechase to Moroccan Olympian Salima El Ouali Alami at the 2013 Arab Athletics Championships. Her time of 9:52.47 minutes was a Bahraini national record for the event. She improved upon her own mark that July at the 2013 Asian Athletics Championships, where she seized the lead from the start and never relinquished her position. She defeated pre-race favourite and Asian Games champion Sudha Singh by more than fifteen seconds and her time of 9:40.84 minutes was a new championship record. This time ranked her as the top Asia steeplechase runner that year.

In 2014, still only 17, she won the World Junior Championship ahead of two other Kenyan girls. That same month at the Weltklasse Zurich with older competition, she set the Asian continental record at 9:20.55, missing the World junior record by only 0.13 of a second (ranking her #31 of all time).

In the 2016 Summer Olympics, she became the first Bahraini athlete to win an Olympic gold medal by winning the 3000m steeplechase with a time of 8:59.75 making her the second fastest within the event of all time. She finished ahead of Kenya's Hyvin Jepkemoi, who ran 9:07.12 to take silver, and American Emma Coburn, who ran 9:07.63 to capture the bronze.

On 27 August 2016, at the Paris stage of the 2016 IAAF Diamond League, Jebet smashed the existing 3000-metres steeplechase world record running at 8:52.78, more than six seconds faster than the old record.

In March 2018, Jebet became embroiled in a drug-testing scandal when she tested positive for r-EPO (recombinant erythropoietin), a performance-enhancing drug that increases stamina by producing more red blood cells. Her agent at the time, Marc Corstjens, denied any knowledge. Jebet told the Athletics Integrity Unit (AIU) she had not taken it intentionally, but after a two-year investigation into the matter a disciplinary tribunal in March 2020 ruled against her, handing down a four-year suspension, which began on 18 February 2018, and stripped Jebet of all her results from 1 December 2017 to 4 February 2018. The ruling didn't affect her gold medal from the 2016 Olympics because she won that before testing positive, nor did it affect her 2016 world record performance.

Jebet has been a controversial figure in Kenya because she switched allegiances to run for Bahrain, offending many Kenyans who have accused her of disloyalty. Running for Bahrain she benefits financially far better than if she ran for Kenya. It was reported she received US$500,000, (the equivalent to 52 million Kenyan shillings) from the Bahrain government for winning her Olympic gold medal. As point of comparison, two-time 800 metres gold medalist and world record holder David Rudisha, running for Kenya, was paid about 1 million Kenyan shillings, about US$10,000.

Awards and achievements
Preceded by Gulnara Samitova-Galkina	Women's 3000 m Steeplechase; World Record Holder; August 27, 2016 – July 20, 2018	Succeeded by Beatrice Chepkoech
