= Sudha Singh =

Indian steeplechase runner

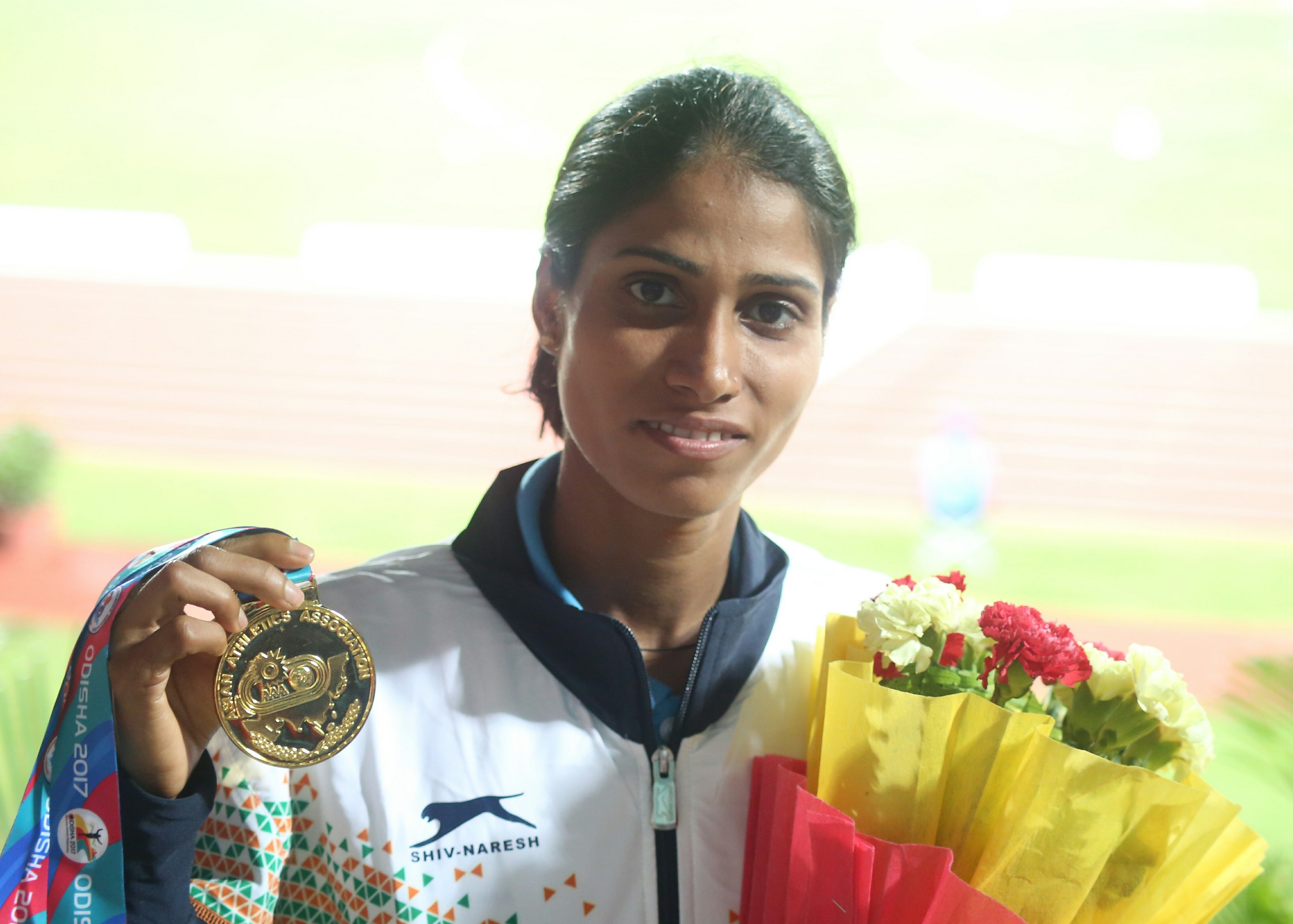
- Singh in 2016

Personal information
- Full name: Sudha Singh
- Nationality: Indian
- Born: 25 June 1986 (age 40) Raebareli, Uttar Pradesh, India
- Height: 1.58 m (5 ft 2 in)
- Weight: 45 kg (99 lb)

Sport
- Country: India
- Sport: Track and field
- Event: 3000 metres steeplechase
- Club: Railways

Achievements and titles
- Personal best: 9:26:55 (Shanghai 2016)
Medal record
Representing India
Women's athletics
Asian Games
Gold medal – first place	2010 Guangzhou	3000 m st.
Silver medal – second place	2018 Jakarta	3000 m st.
Asian Championships
Gold medal – first place	2017 Bhubaneswar	3000 m st.
Silver medal – second place	2009 Guangzhou	3000 m st.
Silver medal – second place	2011 Kobe	3000 m st.
Silver medal – second place	2013 Pune	3000 m st.
- Updated on 9 July 2017

Sudha Singh (born 25 June 1986) is an Indian Olympic athlete in the 3000 metres steeplechase event. A national record holder in the event, she has represented India at international events since 2005. Singh is an Asian Champion in the discipline and has won two gold and four silver medals at varying editions of the Asian Games and the continental championships.

Singh's breakthrough came at the 2010 Asian Games in Guangzhou, where she won the gold medal in steeplechase. She has since won a gold at the 2017 Asian Athletics Championships in Bhubaneswar and a silver at the 2018 Asian Games in Jakarta and has represented India at two consecutive Olympic Games in 2012 and 2016. Singh was conferred with India's second highest sporting honour, the Arjuna Award in 2012.She was awarded India's fourth highest civilian award the Padma Shri in 2021.

== Career ==
Singh's breakthrough performance came in the 2010 Asian Games in Guangzhou, China when she won the gold medal with a time of 9:55.67; she became the first Asian Champion in the discipline as it was the first instance of the 3000 meters steeplechase at the Asian Games.

In June 2012, Singh qualified for Olympic Games 2012 after she broke her own 3,000m steeplechase national record with a timing of 9:47.70 secs. At the 2012 Summer Olympics, Singh finished 13th in her steeplechase heat and did not qualify for the finals.

In the 2014 Asian Games held in Incheon, South Korea, Sudha finished fourth, one place behind Lalita Babar who not only won the bronze medal in the 3000m steeplechase event but also broke Sudha's national record, clocking 9:35.37 in the process. However, the gold medallist Ruth Jebet from Bahrain was disqualified on account of stepping inside the track before crossing the line, and Singh was promoted and won the bronze medal.

In August 2015, Sudha Singh sealed her spot in the 2016 Olympics in Rio de Janeiro, Brazil with a 19th-place finish in the women's marathon event, one place behind O.P.Jaisha in Beijing. Singh finished just behind Jaisha at 19th with a time of 2:35:35.

Maharashtra's Lalita Babar finished the 3000 meters steeplechase in 9:27.09 to win the gold and set the national record while Sudha, representing Uttar Pradesh, came up with a timing of 9:31.86 and bettered the Rio Games qualification standard of 9:45.00 on the second and penultimate day of the Federation Cup National Athletics Championships in Delhi. Singh bettered the national Record in May 2016, at the International Amateur Athletics Federation (IAAF) Diamond League in Shanghai.

At the 2016 Summer Olympics Singh took ill after competing and returned to India, where she was diagnosed with swine flu and ruled out from competition for the rest of the season.

Singh participated in the 2018 Asian Games in Jakarta, having trained under her new coaches Lalit Bhanot and Renu Kolhi. She won the silver medal in the 3000 meters steeplechase with a time of 9:40.04 minutes. Singh told The Quint that she was dropped from the team owing to her age, but was happy that she could come up with a medal under the tutelage of her new support staff. She said: "I am very happy that I won the medal despite everyone telling me that I'm too old to compete at the International circuit [...] My critics have motivated me to do better."

== Awards and honours ==
Following her gold medal at the 2010 Asian Games, Singh was awarded the Manyawar Shri Kanshiram Ji International Sports Award by Government of Uttar Pradesh. Singh was subsequently conferred with the Arjuna Award (India's second highest sporting honour) by the Government of India in 2012.

== International competitions ==
Year	Competition	Venue	Position	Event	Notes
Representing India
2009	Asian Championships	Guangzhou, China	2nd place, silver medalist(s)	3000 m s'chase	10:10.77
2010	Commonwealth Games	Delhi, India	5th	3000 m s'chase	9:57.63
2010	Asian Games	Guangzhou, China	1st place, gold medalist(s)	3000 m s'chase	9:55.67
2011	Asian Championships	Kobe, Japan	2nd place, silver medalist(s)	3000 m s'chase	10:08.52
2012	Olympic Games	London, United Kingdom	21st (h)	3000 m s'chase	9:48.86
2013	Asian Championships	Pune, India	2nd place, silver medalist(s)	3000 m s'chase	10:09.80
2013	World Championships	Moscow, Russia	23rd (h)	3000 m s'chase	9:51.05
2014	Asian Games	Incheon, South Korea	4th	3000 m s'chase	9:35.64
2015	World Championships	Beijing, China	19th	Marathon	2:35:35
2016	Olympic Games	Rio de Janeiro, Brazil	30th (h)	3000 m s'chase	9:43.29
2017	Asian Championships	Bhubaneswar, India	1st place, gold medalist(s)	3000 m s'chase	9:59.47
2018	Asian Games	Jakarta, Indonesia	2nd place, silver medalist(s)	3000 m s'chase	9:40.03
