= Jin Yuan (athlete) =

Chinese long-distance runner

Jin Yuan (born 11 February 1988 in Shanghai) is a female Chinese long-distance runner who specializes in the 3000 metres steeplechase.

She finished ninth at the 2005 Asian Championships and at the 2006 World Junior Championships. She competed in at the 2007 World Championships without reaching the final. She represented her native country at the 2008 Summer Olympics.

== Personal bests ==
- 800 metres - 2:07.74 min (2004)
- 1500 metres - 4:11.66 min (2006)
- 3000 metres - 9:07.18 min (2006)
- 5000 metres - 15:33.41 min (2009)
- 3000 metres steeplechase - 9:41.60 min (2008)
