= Li Zhenzhu =

Chinese long-distance runner

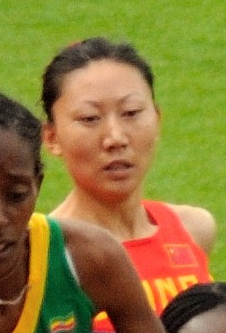

Personal information
- Nationality: Chinese
- Born: 13 December 1985 (age 40) Bayannur, Inner Mongolia, China
- Height: 170 cm (5 ft 7 in)
- Weight: 55 kg (121 lb)

Sport
- Country: China
- Sport: Athletics
- Event: 3000 m steeplechase

Achievements and titles
- Personal best: 9:32.35
Medal record
Asian Games
Silver medal – second place	2014 Inchon	3000 metre steeplechase
- Updated on 16 January 2016

Li Zhenzhu (born 13 December 1985 in Bayannur, Inner Mongolia) is a female Chinese long-distance runner who specializes in the 3000 metres steeplechase.

She competed at the 2007 World Championships without reaching the final. She represented her country at the 2008 Summer Olympics and 2012 Summer Olympics.

At the 2014 Asian Games, she won the silver medal behind Ruth Jebet.

Her personal best times are:

- 1500 metres - 4:14.57 min (2004)
- 3000 metres - 9:17.52 min (2004)
- 3000 metres steeplechase - 9:32.35 min (2007), Asian record at the time.
