= Habiba Ghribi =

Tunisian middle- and long-distance runner

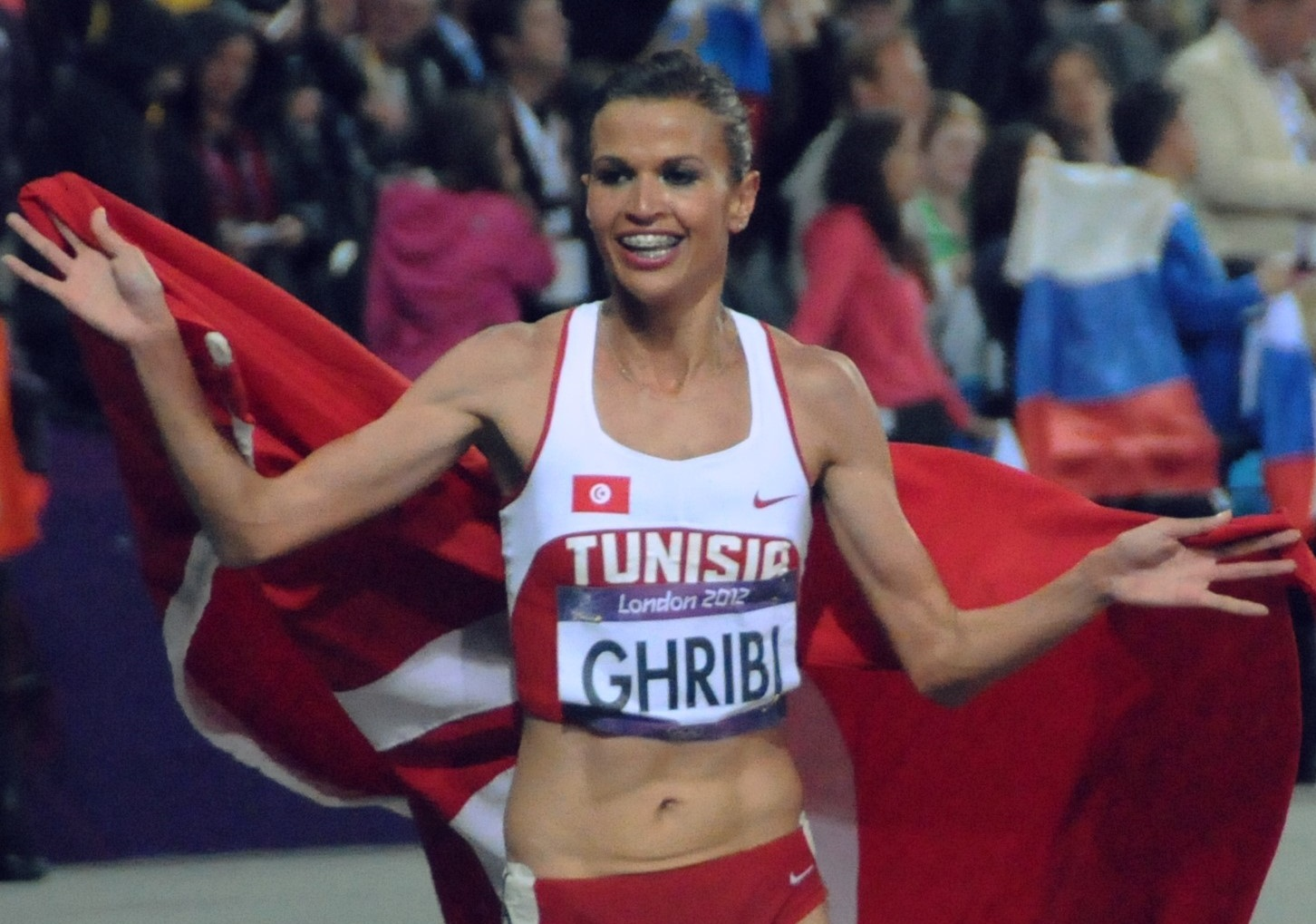
- Ghribi at the 2012 Olympics

Personal information
- Nickname: Bibi
- Nationality: Tunisian
- Born: 9 April 1984 (age 42) Kairouan, Tunisia
- Height: 1.74 m (5 ft 8 1/2 in)
- Weight: 56 kg (123 lb; 8.8 st)
- Website: habibaghribi.com

Sport
- Country: Tunisia
- Sport: Athletics
- Event: 3000 metres steeplechase
- Coached by: Constantin Nourescu (ROU)
Medal record
Women's athletics
Representing Tunisia
Olympic Games
Gold medal – first place	2012 London	3000 m st.
World Championships
Gold medal – first place	2011 Daegu	3000 m st.
Silver medal – second place	2015 Beijing	3000 m st.
African Championships
Silver medal – second place	2006 Bambous	3000 m st.
Mediterranean Games
Bronze medal – third place	2009 Pescara	1500 m

Habiba Ghribi (Arabic: حبيبة الغريبي, born 9 April 1984) is a Tunisian middle- and long-distance runner who specialises in the 3000 metres steeplechase. She won the gold medal at the 2012 Summer Olympics, giving her country its first Olympic medal by a woman. She is also the Tunisian record holder in the event, having run 9:05.36 at the Memorial van Damme in Brussels in September 2015.

Ghribi competed at the IAAF World Cross Country Championships a number of times but found greater success on the track, winning a steeplechase silver at the 2006 African Championships in Athletics and a bronze in the 1500 metres at the 2009 Mediterranean Games. She represented Tunisia at the 2008 Beijing Olympics, finishing thirteenth in the first ever women's Olympic steeplechase race. In the 2016 Müller Anniversary Games, she won the women's 3000m steeplechase. She was voted the Best Sportswoman of 2009 by the Arabic daily newspaper Assahafa.

== Career ==
Ghribi began her career as a cross country runner and competed in the junior race at the 2000 IAAF World Cross Country Championships at the age of fifteen, finishing in 46th place (the second best of the Tunisian team). She competed in the senior short race in 2002, finishing in 76th. Ghribi competed at the 2002 African Championships in Athletics in Radès, Tunisia and ended up in 11th place in the 5000 metres final. Ghribi won the gold in the junior race at the 2002 Pan Arab Cross Country Championships. She also went back to the junior race in 2003 IAAF World Cross Country Championships, improving to 23rd place and heading the Tunisian team to 7th place overall. After modest finishes in the World Cross Country short race in the 2004 and 2005, she switched to focus on the 3000 m steeplechase on the track instead when it became a world championship event.

Ghribi took part in her first World Championships in Athletics at the 2005 Helsinki Championships and finished eighth in her heat, not managing to qualify for the women's final but setting a personal best and Tunisian record of 9:51.49 nevertheless. She gained her first major medal in the event the following year, taking the silver medal at the 2006 African Championships in Athletics behind world medallist Jeruto Kiptum

Ghribi's next major competition was the 2008 Beijing Olympics. This was the first time that the Olympics had held a women's steeplechase competition and she greatly improved her record to 9:25.50 in the Olympic heats, but was a little slower in the final and finished 13th overall.

Ghribi competed at a number of major events in 2009, starting with her first ever long race at the 2009 IAAF World Cross Country Championships where she finished in 41st place. After this she ran in the 1500 metres at the 2009 Mediterranean Games and achieved a personal best of 4:12.37 on her way to a bronze medal. She made her second world steeplechase appearance at the 2009 World Championships in Athletics and further improved her best by a significant amount in the World final. Her time of 9:12.52 took her up to sixth place. Ghribi closed the year with a performance at the 2009 IAAF World Athletics Final results, but she failed to finish the race.

In recognition of her achievements in 2009, Ghribi topped a poll organised by the Arabic language daily Assahafa and was named as the "Best Sportswoman in 2009" in Tunisia.

In September 2015 she ran a personal best, Tunisian national record, African record and the 4th fastest time ever of 9:05.36 at the Memorial van Damme in Brussels, Belgium.

In June 2016, Ghribi was officially named the 2012 Olympic champion in the women's 3000 m steeplechase, several months after the original gold medalist, Yuliya Zaripova of Russia, was disqualified due to a doping violation. As of December 2016, Ghribi was considering legal action to recover at least $38,000 in prize money that Zaripova had received at events from which she was later disqualified.

== Personal bests ==
Event	Time (m:s)	Venue	Date
1500 metres	4:06.38	Zagreb, Croatia	2 September 2014
3000 metres	8:52.06	Franconville, France	28 April 2013
5000 metres	16:12.9	Radès, Tunisia	22 June 2003
3000 metres steeplechase	9:05.36	Brussels, Belgium	11 September 2015

- All information taken from IAAF profile.

== Competition record ==
Year	Competition	Venue	Position	Event	Notes
2000	World Cross Country Championships	Vilamoura, Portugal	46th	Junior race	
2002	World Cross Country Championships	Dublin, Ireland	76th	Short race	
2002	Pan Arab Cross Country Championships	Amman, Jordan	1st	Junior race	
2002	African Championships	Radès, Tunisia	11th	5000 m	
2003	World Cross Country Championships	Lausanne, Switzerland	23rd	Junior race	
2004	World Cross Country Championships	Brussels, Belgium	68th	Short race	
2005	World Cross Country Championships	Saint-Étienne, France	48th	Short race	
2005	World Championships in Athletics	Helsinki, Finland	heats	3000 m st.	9:51.49 (NR)
2006	African Championships	Bambous, Mauritius	2nd	3000 m st.	
2008	Olympic Games	Beijing, China	13th	3000 m st.	9:25.50 (NR)
2009	World Cross Country Championships	Amman, Jordan	41st	Senior race	
2009	Mediterranean Games	Pescara, Italy	3rd	1500 m	4:12.37 (PB)
2009	World Championships in Athletics	Berlin, Germany	6th	3000 m st.	9:12.52 (NR)
2011	World Championships in Athletics	Daegu, South Korea	1st	3000 m st.	9:11.97 (NR)
2012	Olympic Games	London, England	1st	3000 m st.	9:08.37 (NR)
2014	Diamond League	Zürich, Switzerland	1st	3000 m st.	9:15:23
2015	Diamond League	Monaco, Monaco	1st	3000 m st.	9:11:28
2015	World Championships	Beijing, China	2nd	3000 m st.	9:19.24
2015	Diamond League	Brussels, Belgium	1st	3000 m st.	9:05.36 (NR) (AR)

== Personal life ==
Habiba Ghribi married her coach, Khaled Boudhraa, who is of Algerian origin. She announced her divorce after the London Olympics. She later got engaged to athlete Bouabdellah Tahri. On September 30, 2017, Habiba Ghribi married Yassine Saya, a Tunisian businessman. She gave birth to a daughter, Alyssa, on May 2, 2019, in Canada.
