= 2017 European Athletics U23 Championships – Women's 3000 metres steeplechase =

The women's 3000 metres steeplechase event at the 2017 European Athletics U23 Championships was held in Bydgoszcz, Poland, at Zdzisław Krzyszkowiak Stadium on 13 and 15 July.

== Medalists ==
Gold	Anna Emilie Møller; Denmark
Silver	Nataliya Strebkova; Ukraine
Bronze	Emma Oudiou; France

== Results ==
=== Heats ===
13 July

Qualification rule: First 5 (Q) and the next 5 fastest (q) qualified for the final.

Rank	Heat	Name	Nationality	Time	Notes
1	1	Claudia Prisecaru	Romania	10:07.40	Q, PB
2	2	Anna Emilie Møller	Denmark	10:07.70	Q
3	1	Nataliya Strebkova	Ukraine	10:10.12	Q
4	2	Aimee Pratt	Great Britain	10:10.15	Q
5	1	Emma Oudiou	France	10:10.18	Q
6	1	Adva Cohen	Israel	10:10.22	Q, NR
7	1	Lea Mayer	Germany	10:10.33	Q
8	1	Aneta Konieczek	Poland	10:10.39	q
9	1	Chiara Scherrer	Switzerland	10:14.08	q, PB
10	2	Sümeyye Erol	Turkey	10:14.09	Q
11	1	Lea Navarro	France	10:14.08	q
12	2	Silvia Oggioni	Italy	10:16.54	Q
13	2	Veerle Bakker	Netherlands	10:16.71	Q
14	2	Liane Weidner	Germany	10:17.50	q
15	1	Isabel Mattuzzi	Italy	10:20.69	q
16	2	Eleonora Curtabbi	Italy	10:21.81	
17	1	Victoria Salvadores	Spain	10:22.00	PB
18	2	Patrycja Kapała	Poland	10:26.02	
19	1	Tubay Erdal	Turkey	10:27.07	
20	1	Yayla Kiliç	Turkey	10:39.75	SB
21	2	Manon Pareau	France	10:41.88	
22	2	Anett Somogyi	Hungary	10:51.32	
23	2	Barblin Remund	Switzerland	10:54.41	

=== Final ===
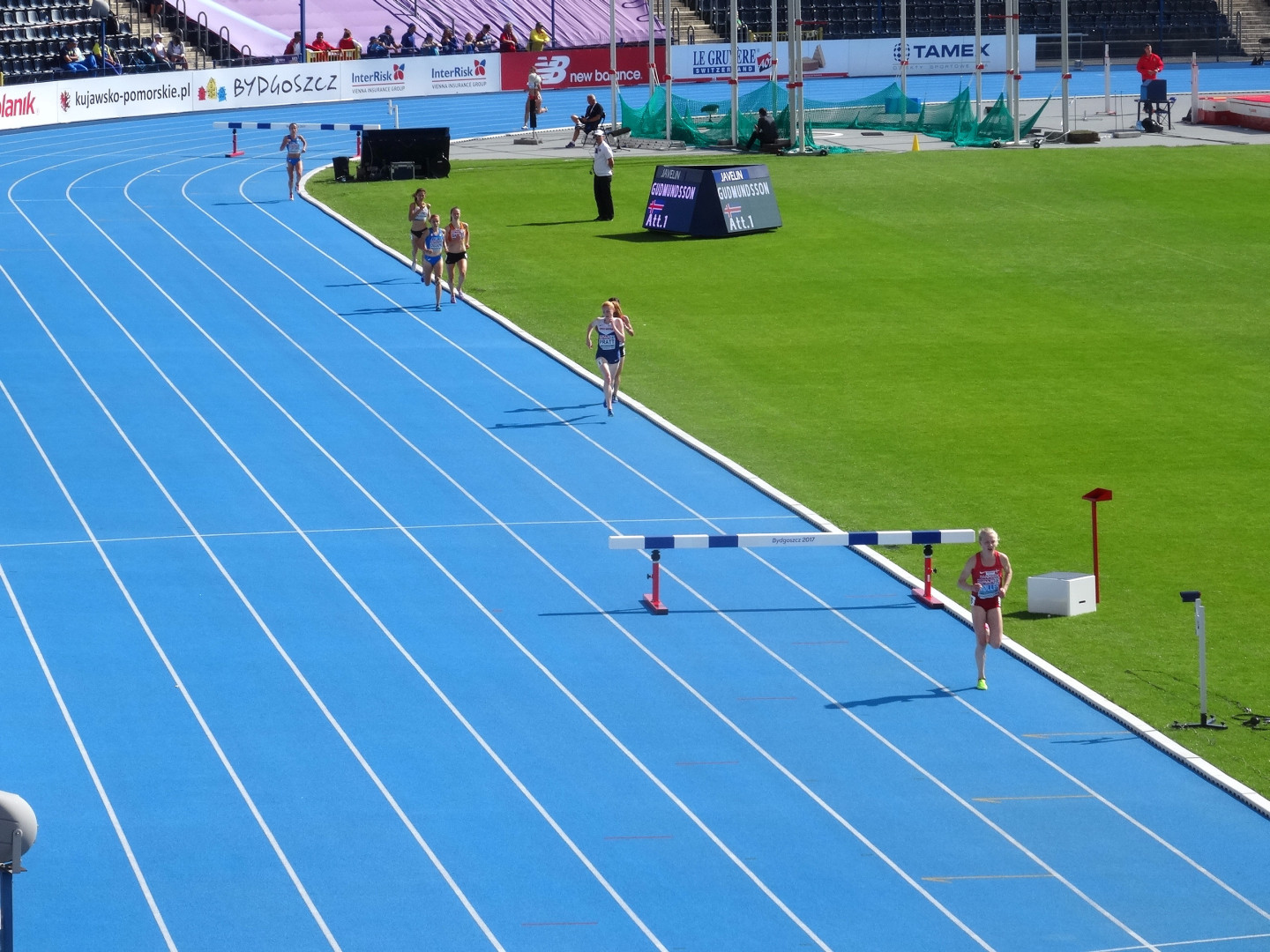
Final stages of the race

15 July

Rank	Name	Nationality	Time	Notes
1st place, gold medalist(s)	Anna Emilie Møller	Denmark	9:43.05	
2nd place, silver medalist(s)	Nataliya Strebkova	Ukraine	9:44.52	NU23R
3rd place, bronze medalist(s)	Emma Oudiou	France	9:50.30	SB
4	Claudia Prisecaru	Romania	9:57.37	PB
5	Isabel Mattuzzi	Italy	9:57.68	PB
6	Lea Mayer	Germany	9:58.16	PB
7	Aneta Konieczek	Poland	10:05.87	
8	Chiara Scherrer	Switzerland	10:06.41	PB
9	Adva Cohen	Israel	10:07.82	NR
10	Lea Navarro	France	10:11.63	
11	Silvia Oggioni	Italy	10:20.55	
12	Liane Weidner	Germany	10:22.83	
13	Sümeyye Erol	Turkey	10:25.39	
14	Aimee Pratt	Great Britain	10:28.64	
15	Veerle Bakker	Netherlands	10:43.10	
