= Athletics at the 2019 Pan American Games – Women's 3000 metres steeplechase =

Women's 3000 metres steeplechase at the 2019 Pan American Games
- Venue: Athletics Stadium
- Dates: August 10
- Competitors: 13 from 9 nations
- Winning time: 9:41.45

Medalists
Gold medal	Geneviève Lalonde	Canada
Silver medal	Marisa Howard	United States
Bronze medal	Belén Casetta	Argentina

The women's 3000 metres steeplechase competition of the athletics events at the 2019 Pan American Games took place the 10 August at the 2019 Pan American Games Athletics Stadium. The defending Pan American Games champion is Ashley Higginson from United States.

== Summary ==
From the start of the race, Tatiane Raquel da Silva and Geneviève Lalonde went to the front, da Silva on the rail and Lalonde on her outside shoulder. They held that formation for four laps before da Silva slipped back, leaving Lalonde in control on the rail. The outer position was filled by Marisa Howard with Belén Casetta also getting ahead of da Silva. Regan Yee tagged on the end of a 5 woman break from the rest of the field. Over the next lap, Lalonde broke away from Howard and Casetta was the only one to tag along. Over the final 2 laps, Lalonde put the hammer down and extended her lead to a 2 and a half second victory. Over the final lap, Casetta tried to close down the gap to Howard, but Howard was monitoring the situation. When Casetta tried to sprint coming off the water jump, Howard responded to hold on to silver.

== Records ==
Prior to this competition, the existing world and Pan American Games records were as follows:

World record	Beatrice Chepkoech (KEN)	8:44.32	Monaco	July 20, 2018
Pan American Games record	Ashley Higginson (USA)	9:48.12	Canada, Toronto	July 24, 2015

== Schedule ==
Date	Time	Round
August 10, 2019	15:10	Final

== Results ==
All times shown are in seconds.

KEY:	q	Fastest non-qualifiers	Q	Qualified	NR	National record	PB	Personal best	SB	Seasonal best	DQ	Disqualified

=== Final ===
The results were as follows

Rank	Name	Nationality	Time	Notes
1st place, gold medalist(s)	Geneviève Lalonde	Canada	9:41.45	GR
2nd place, silver medalist(s)	Marisa Howard	United States	9:43.78	
3rd place, bronze medalist(s)	Belén Casetta	Argentina	9:44.46	
4	Tatiane Raquel da Silva	Brazil	9:56.19	
5	Regan Yee	Canada	10:00.08	
6	Katherine Tisalema	Ecuador	10:06.74	NR
7	Rina Cjuro	Peru	10:08.12	PB
8	Simone Ferraz	Brazil	10:11.04	
9	Andrea Ferris	Panama	10:17.21	
10	Rolanda Bell	Panama	10:34.76	
11	Margarita Núñez	Peru	10:55.77	
	Natali Mendoza	Mexico	DNF	
	Tania Chavez	Bolivia	DSQ	
	Allie Ostrander	United States	DNS	
