= 2019 European Athletics U23 Championships – Women's 3000 metres steeplechase =

The women's 3000 metres steeplechase event at the 2019 European Athletics U23 Championships was held in Gävle, Sweden, at Gavlehof Stadium Park on 11 and 13 July.

== Medalists ==
Gold	Silver	Bronze
Anna Emilie Møller; Denmark	Eilish Flanagan; Ireland	Claudia Prisecaru; Romania

== Results ==
=== Heats ===
Qualification: First 5 in each heat (Q) and next 5 fastest (q) qualified for the final.

Rank	Heat	Name	Nationality	Time	Notes
1	2	Anna Emilie Møller	Denmark	10:01.00	Q
2	2	Claudia Prisecaru	Romania	10:01.45	Q
3	1	Aimee Pratt	Great Britain	10:05.79	Q
4	2	Patrycja Kapała	Poland	10:09.35	Q
5	2	Lea Meyer	Germany	10:10.05	Q
6	2	Semra Karaslan	Turkey	10:10.09	Q, PB
7	2	Sümeyye Erol	Turkey	10:10.13	q
8	2	Jasmijn Bakker	Netherlands	10:12.40	q
9	2	Boglárka Mógor	Hungary	10:15.06	q, PB
10	1	Lili Anna Tóth	Hungary	10:15.70	Q
11	1	Agnes Thurid Gers	Germany	10:15.93	Q
12	1	Eilish Flanagan	Ireland	10:19.19	Q
13	1	Alexa Lemitre	France	10:20.65	Q
14	1	Gülnaz Uskun	Turkey	10:20.70	q
15	1	Katharina Pesendorfer	Austria	10:21.81	q
16	1	Carla Reis	Portugal	10:24.55	PB
17	2	Laura Taborda	Portugal	10:27.88	PB
18	1	Zorana Grujić	Serbia	10:29.12	
19	1	Julia Samuelsson	Sweden	10:54.53	

=== Final ===
Rank	Name	Nationality	Time	Notes
1st place, gold medalist(s)	Anna Emilie Møller	Denmark	9:27.31	
2nd place, silver medalist(s)	Eilish Flanagan	Ireland	9:51.72	PB
3rd place, bronze medalist(s)	Claudia Prisecaru	Romania	9:53.21	PB
4	Agnes Thurid Gers	Germany	9:53.73	PB
5	Lea Meyer	Germany	9:55.37	
6	Semra Karaslan	Turkey	9:58.25	PB
7	Jasmijn Bakker	Netherlands	9:59.02	
8	Patrycja Kapała	Poland	10:12.23	
9	Alexa Lemitre	France	10:12.40	
10	Lili Anna Tóth	Hungary	10:16.25	
11	Aimee Pratt	Great Britain	10:18.98	
12	Gülnaz Uskun	Turkey	10:19.25	
13	Boglárka Mógor	Hungary	10:19.70	
14	Sümeyye Erol	Turkey	10:30.63	
15	Katharina Pesendorfer	Austria	10:48.06	
