= 2015 World Youth Championships in Athletics – Girls' 2000 metres steeplechase =

Girls' 2000 metres steeplechase at the 2015 World Youth Championships in Athletics
- Venue: Estadio Olímpico Pascual Guerrero
- Dates: 15 and 17 July
- Competitors: 31 from 22 nations
- Winning time: 6:17.15

Medalists
gold medal	Celliphine Chespol	Kenya
silver medal	Sandra Tuei	Kenya
bronze medal	Agrie Belachew	Ethiopia

The girls' 2000 metres steeplechase at the 2015 World Youth Championships in Athletics was held at the Estadio Olímpico Pascual Guerrero in Cali, Colombia on 15 and 17 July 2015.

== Records ==
Prior to the competition, the following records were as follows.

World Youth Best	Korahubish Itaa (ETH)	6:11.83	Bressanone, Italy	10 July 2009
Championship Record	Korahubish Itaa (ETH)	6:11.83	Bressanone, Italy	10 July 2009
World Youth Leading	Sandra Tuei (KEN)	6:16.19	Nairobi, Kenya	17 June 2015

== Results ==
=== Round 1 ===
First 5 in each heat (Q) and the next 5 fastest (q) advance to the final.

Rank	Heat	Name	Nationality	Time	Note
1	2	Sandra Tuei	Kenya	6:26.70	Q
2	1	Celliphine Chespol	Kenya	6:31.97	Q
3	1	Agrie Belachew	Ethiopia	6:33.39	Q
4	1	Lili Tóth	Hungary	6:43.73	Q
5	2	Beletu Hailu	Ethiopia	6:49.49	Q
6	1	Tatsiana Shabanava	Belarus	6:50.24	Q
7	2	Alondra Negrón	Puerto Rico	6:56.45	Q
8	2	Yuki Shibata	Japan	6:56.60	Q
9	1	Lena Millonig	Austria	6:57.53	Q
10	2	Glynis Sim	Canada	6:59.10	Q
11	2	Rylee Bowen	United States	6:59.10	q
12	1	Catherine Beauchemin	Canada	7:00.75	q
13	2	Tian Wanhua	China	7:03.92	q
14	1	Rina Cjuro	Peru	7:05.55	q
15	1	Marie Nivet	France	7:07.39	q
16	1	Iulia Dragoi	Romania	7:08.73	
17	2	Elena Dan	Romania	7:08.78	
18	2	Erika Pilicita	Ecuador	7:09.67	
19	1	Ana Junquera	Spain	7:11.14	
20	2	Marta Pescador	Spain	7:11.51	
21	2	Fany Challa	Peru	7:11.74	
22	2	Kelsey Forman	New Zealand	7:14.51	
23	2	Lucie Nivet	France	7:15.48	
24	1	Lada Fomina	Kazakhstan	7:17.68	
25	2	Karen Acoltzi	Mexico	7:18.01	
26	1	Jasmina Pruginić	Serbia	7:19.42	
27	1	Agustina Boucherie	Argentina	7:23.01	
28	2	Erica Sorrentino	Italy	7:23.70	
29	2	Camila Parra	Colombia	7:34.85	
30	1	María Guerrero	Colombia	7:37.71	SB
31	1	Ke Xiaojuan	China	7:51.39	

=== Final ===
Rank	Name	Nationality	Time	Note
1st place, gold medalist(s)	Celliphine Chespol	Kenya	6:17.15	PB
2nd place, silver medalist(s)	Sandra Tuei	Kenya	6:19.61	
3rd place, bronze medalist(s)	Agrie Belachew	Ethiopia	6:34.68	
4	Alondra Negrón	Puerto Rico	6:39.51	
5	Beletu Hailu	Ethiopia	6:41.46	
6	Glynis Sim	Canada	6:45.58	PB
7	Yuki Shibata	Japan	6:48.41	
8	Rina Cjuro	Peru	6:50.90	PB
9	Lena Millonig	Austria	6:52.24	
10	Tian Wanhua	China	6:53.70	PB
11	Lili Tóth	Hungary	7:03.25	
12	Marie Nivet	France	7:03.89	
13	Tatsiana Shabanava	Belarus	7:05.61	
14	Rylee Bowen	United States	7:11.66	
–	Catherine Beauchemin	Canada	DNS	
