= 2016 IAAF World U20 Championships – Women's 3000 metres steeplechase =

The women's 3000 metres steeplechase event at the 2016 IAAF World U20 Championships was held at Zdzisław Krzyszkowiak Stadium on 19 and 22 July.

== Medalists ==
Gold	Celliphine Chepteek Chespol; Kenya
Silver	Tigist Getnet; Bahrain
Bronze	Agrie Belachew; Ethiopia

== Records ==
Standing records prior to the 2016 IAAF World U20 Championships in Athletics
World Junior Record	Birtukan Adamu (ETH)	9:20.37	Rome, Italy	26 May 2011
Championship Record	Christine Kambua Muyanga (KEN)	9:31.35	Bydgoszcz, Poland	10 July 2008
World Junior Leading	Celliphine Chepteek Chespol (KEN)	9:24.73	Shanghai, China	14 May 2016

== Results ==
=== Heats ===
Qualification: First 5 of each heat (Q) and the 5 fastest times (q) qualified for the final.

Rank	Heat	Name	Nationality	Time	Note
1	1	Tigist Getnet	Bahrain	9:54.65	Q
2	1	Betty Chepkemoi Kibet	Kenya	9:54.65	Q, PB
3	1	Agrie Belachew	Ethiopia	9:54.84	Q, PB
4	1	Peruth Chemutai	Uganda	9:54.85	Q, NU20R
5	2	Celliphine Chepteek Chespol	Kenya	9:55.21	Q
6	2	Asimarech Naga	Ethiopia	10:05.71	Q
7	2	Anna Emilie Møller	Denmark	10:06.26	Q
8	2	Charlotte Prouse	Canada	10:06.91	Q
9	2	Aneta Konieczek	Poland	10:12.26	Q
10	1	Chika Mukai	Japan	10:13.61	Q
11	2	Marwa Bouzayani	Tunisia	10:13.77	q, NU20R
12	1	Lili Tóth	Hungary	10:14.18	q, PB
13	2	Georgia Winkcup	Australia	10:16.14	q, PB
14	1	Beth Croft	Australia	10:19.51	q, SB
15	2	Liane Weidner	Germany	10:21.09	q
16	2	Aimee Pratt	Great Britain	10:25.51	
17	2	Yuki Shibata	Japan	10:25.66	
18	2	Rina Cjuro	Peru	10:26.45	
19	1	Alexa Lemitre	France	10:27.40	
20	1	Tatsiana Shabanava	Belarus	10:29.96	SB
21	1	Gülnaz Uskun	Turkey	10:31.16	
22	2	Lena Millonig	Austria	10:31.83	
23	2	Léa Navarro	France	10:33.56	
24	1	Patrycja Kapała	Poland	10:35.71	
25	1	Zhong Xiaoqian	China	10:37.51	
26	2	Kelly Naumann	United States	10:45.90	
27	2	Yayla Kiliç	Turkey	10:46.28	
28	2	Eleonora Curtabbi	Italy	10:50.46	
29	1	Nicole Reina	Italy	10:51.34	
30	1	Rachel Nichwitz	United States	11:01.69	
31	1	Luz Karen Olivera	Peru	11:02.23	
32	1	Catherine Beauchemin	Canada	11:24.11	

=== Final ===
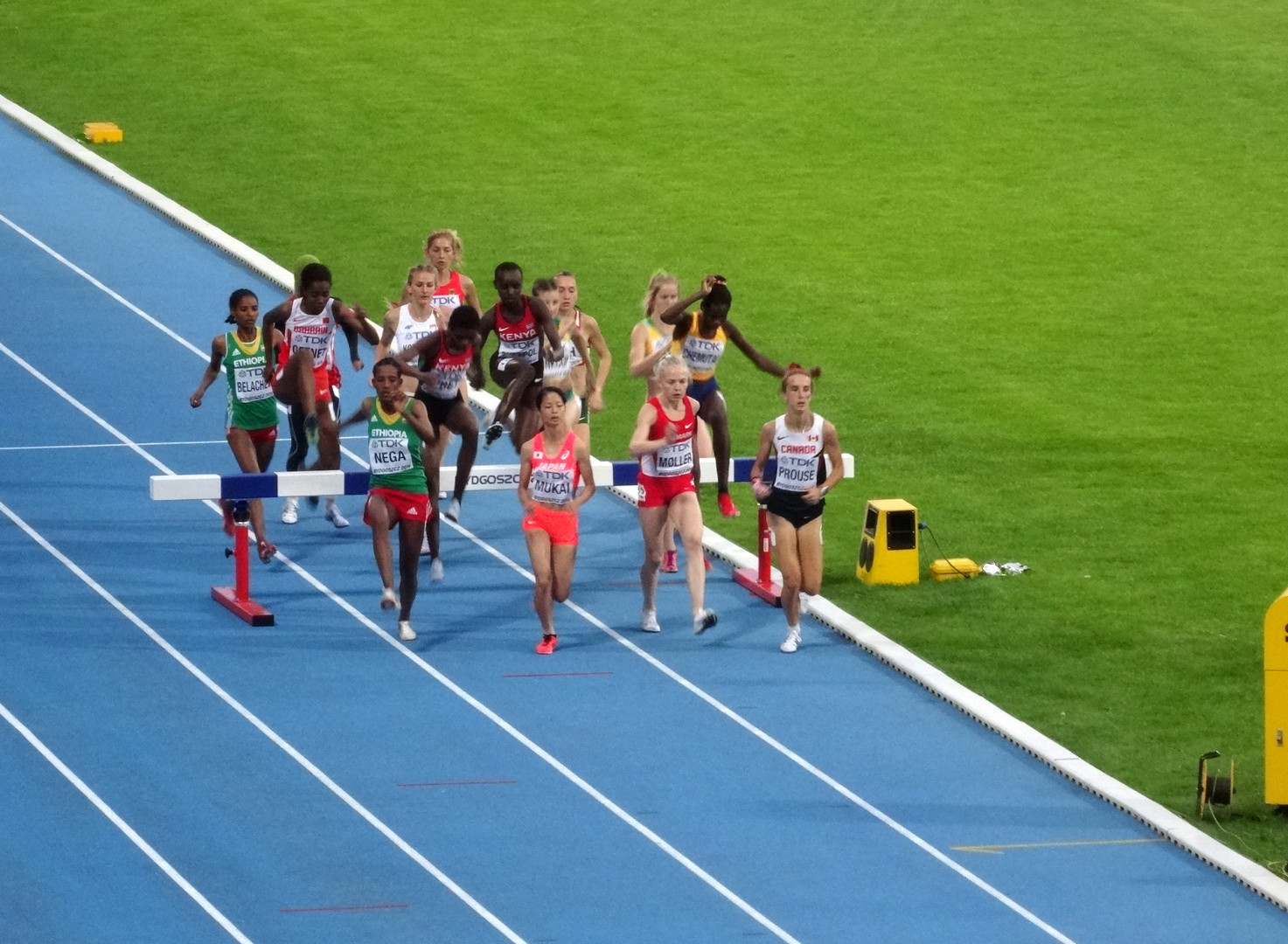
The final

Rank	Name	Nationality	Time	Note
1st place, gold medalist(s)	Celliphine Chepteek Chespol	Kenya	9:25.15	CR
2nd place, silver medalist(s)	Tigist Getnet	Bahrain	9:34.08	
3rd place, bronze medalist(s)	Agrie Belachew	Ethiopia	9:37.17	PB
4	Betty Chepkemoi Kibet	Kenya	9:38.27	PB
5	Anna Emilie Møller	Denmark	9:43.84	
6	Charlotte Prouse	Canada	9:44.62	AU20R
7	Peruth Chemutai	Uganda	9:49.29	NU20R
8	Asimarech Naga	Ethiopia	9:55.14	
9	Aneta Konieczek	Poland	10:00.58	
10	Lili Tóth	Hungary	10:04.17	NU20R
11	Marwa Bouzayani	Tunisia	10:05.25	NU20R
12	Liane Weidner	Germany	10:22.27	
13	Beth Croft	Australia	10:29.67	
14	Chika Mukai	Japan	10:35.71	
15	Georgia Winkcup	Australia	10:41.16	
