= Athletics at the 2020 Summer Olympics – Women's 3000 metres steeplechase =

Women's 3000 metres steeplechase at the Games of the XXXII Olympiad
- Olympic Athletics
- Venue: Japan National Stadium
- Dates: 1 August 2021 (round 1); 4 August 2021 (final)
- Competitors: 41 from 24 nations

Medalists
| 1st place, gold medalist(s) | | Peruth Chemutai | Uganda |
| 2nd place, silver medalist(s) | | Courtney Frerichs | United States |
| 3rd place, bronze medalist(s) | | Hyvin Jepkemoi | Kenya |

The women's 3000 metres steeplechase event at the 2020 Summer Olympics took place on 1 and 4 August 2021 at the Japan National Stadium. 41 athletes competed.

== Summary ==
Beatrice Chepkoech came in to these Olympics as the World Record holder and World Champion, but she has not seemed as dominant in 2021. 2016 Gold Medalist Ruth Jebet could not return due to a drug suspension for using EPO. Silver medalist Hyvin Kiyeng Jepkemoi and bronze medalist Emma Coburn returned.

In the final, Chepkoech moved to the front of the line. The pack aveher the lead as they got organized at a slow pace. After a lap, Peruth Chemutai stepped out to lane 2 and cruised from the back of the pack to the front to up the speed. For the next two and a half laps, Kiyeng, Coburn, Chepkoech, Winfred Yavi and Courtney Frerichs jockeyed around behind Chemutai while the rest of the sixteen starters struggled to keep up. Then Frerichs moved to the front, injecting more speed. The group of six broke off the front. Seeing the break, Maruša Mišmaš-Zrimšek almost sprinted to bridge the gap and joining the group. After another lap, Chepkoech struggled and fell off the back. About the same time, Frerichs broke off the front, only Chemutai gave chase. Coming off the water jump with a little more than two laps to go, Frerichs accelerated again, losing Chemutai up to 15 metres behind. After the next water jump, with a little over a lap to go, Chemutai sped up to pull in the gap. She went by Frerichs with authority at the beginning of the backstretch. Frerichs accelerated again to keep contact with Chemutai. Chemutai took the final water jump cleanly, Frerichs got hung up in the water and the break was made. Chemutai cruised home with a 20 metre margin, holding up her number one finger to celebrate Uganda's first victory in the Steeplechase and becoming the first Ugandan woman to take gold. Frerichs lost her momentum and struggled home the final straightaway but still had enough of a margin on a fast closing Kiyeng to take silver.

== Background ==
This was the 4th appearance of the event, having appeared at every Olympics since 2008.

== Qualification ==
A National Olympic Committee (NOC) could enter up to 3 qualified athletes in the women's 3000 metres steeplechase event if all athletes meet the entry standard or qualify by ranking during the qualifying period. (The limit of 3 has been in place since the 1930 Olympic Congress.) The qualifying standard is 9:30.00. This standard was "set for the sole purpose of qualifying athletes with exceptional performances unable to qualify through the IAAF World Rankings pathway." The world rankings, based on the average of the best five results for the athlete over the qualifying period and weighted by the importance of the meet, will then be used to qualify athletes until the cap of 45 is reached.

The qualifying period was originally from 1 May 2019 to 29 June 2020. Due to the COVID-19 pandemic, the period was suspended from 6 April 2020 to 30 November 2020, with the end date extended to 29 June 2021. The world rankings period start date was also changed from 1 May 2019 to 30 June 2020; athletes who had met the qualifying standard during that time were still qualified, but those using world rankings would not be able to count performances during that time. The qualifying time standards could be obtained in various meets during the given period that have the approval of the IAAF. Both indoor and outdoor meets are eligible. The most recent Area Championships may be counted in the ranking, even if not during the qualifying period.

NOCs cannot use their universality place in the 3000 metres steeplechase.

== Competition format ==
The event continued to use the two-round format introduced in 2012.

== Records ==
Prior to this competition, the existing world, Olympic, and area records are as follows.

| World record | Beatrice Chepkoech (KEN) | 8:44.32 | Monaco | 20 July 2018 |
| Olympic record | Gulnara Galkina (RUS) | 8:58.81 | Beijing, China | 17 August 2008 |

| Area | Time (s) | Athlete | Nation |
|---|---|---|---|
| Africa (records) | 8:44.32 WR | Beatrice Chepkoech | Kenya |
| Asia (records) | 8:52.78 | Ruth Jebet | Bahrain |
| Europe (records) | 8:58.81 | Gulnara Samitova-Galkina | Russia |
| North, Central America and Caribbean (records) | 9:00.85 | Courtney Frerichs | United States |
| Oceania (records) | 9:14.28 | Genevieve LaCaze | Australia |
| South America (records) | 9:25.99 | Belén Casetta | Argentina |

The following national records were established during the competition:

| Nation | Athlete | Round | Time | Notes |
|---|---|---|---|---|
| Canada | Genevieve Lalonde | Round 1 | 9:22.64 | |
| Brazil | Tatiane Raquel da Silva | Round 1 | 9:36.43 | |
| Uganda | Peruth Chemutai | Final | 9:01.45 | |
| Slovenia | Maruša Mišmaš-Zrimšek | Final | 9:14.84 | |
| Great Britain | Elizabeth Bird | Final | 9:19.69 | |

== Schedule ==
All times are Japan Standard Time (UTC+9)

The women's 3000 metres steeplechase will take place over two separate days.

| Date | Time | Round |
|---|---|---|
| Sunday, 1 August 2021 | 9:10 | Round 1 |
| Wednesday, 4 August 2021 | 20:00 | Final |

== Results ==
=== Round 1 ===
Qualification rule: First 3 in each heat (Q) and the next 6 fastest (q) advance to the Final.

==== Heat 1 ====
| Rank | Athlete | Nation | Time | Notes |
|---|---|---|---|---|
| 1 | Winfred Yavi | Bahrain | 9:10.80 | Q |
| 2 | Peruth Chemutai | Uganda | 9:12.72 | Q, SB |
| 3 | Emma Coburn | United States | 9:16.91 | Q |
| 4 | Geneviève Lalonde | Canada | 9:22.64 | q, NR |
| 5 | Purity Cherotich Kirui | Kenya | 9:30.13 | |
| 6 | Marwa Bouzayani | Tunisia | 9:31.25 | PB |
| 7 | Lea Meyer | Germany | 9:33.00 | |
| 8 | Xu Shuangshuang | China | 9:34.92 | |
| 9 | Michelle Finn | Ireland | 9:36.26 | |
| 10 | Lomi Muleta | Ethiopia | 9:45.81 | |
| 11 | Nataliya Strebkova | Ukraine | 9:49.15 | |
| 12 | Belén Casetta | Argentina | 9:52.89 | |
| 13 | Georgia Winkcup | Australia | 9:59.29 | |
| 14 | Simone Ferraz | Brazil | 10:00.92 | |

==== Heat 2 ====
| Rank | Athlete | Nation | Time | Notes |
|---|---|---|---|---|
| 1 | Courtney Frerichs | United States | 9:19.34 | Q |
| 2 | Gesa Felicitas Krause | Germany | 9:19.62 | Q |
| 3 | Beatrice Chepkoech | Kenya | 9:19.82 | Q |
| 4 | Zerfe Wondemagegn | Ethiopia | 9:20.01 | q |
| 5 | Luiza Gega | Albania | 9:23.85 | q, SB |
| 6 | Genevieve Gregson | Australia | 9:26.11 | q |
| 7 | Tatiane Raquel da Silva | Brazil | 9:36.43 | NR |
| 8 | Regan Yee | Canada | 9:41.14 | |
| 9 | Irene van der Reijken | Netherlands | 9:42.98 | |
| 10 | Yuno Yamanaka | Japan | 9:43.83 | |
| 11 | Aimee Pratt | Great Britain | 9:47.56 | |
| 12 | Aneta Konieczek | Poland | 10:07.25 | |
| 13 | Zita Kácser | Hungary | 10:43.99 | |

==== Heat 3 ====
| Rank | Athlete | Nation | Time | Notes |
|---|---|---|---|---|
| 1 | Hyvin Jepkemoi | Kenya | 9:23.17 | Q |
| 2 | Maruša Mišmaš-Zrimšek | Slovenia | 9:23.36 | Q |
| 3 | Mekides Abebe | Ethiopia | 9:23.95 | Q |
| 4 | Valerie Constien | United States | 9:24.31 | q |
| 5 | Elizabeth Bird | Great Britain | 9:24.34 | q |
| 6 | Elena Burkard | Germany | 9:30.64 | |
| 7 | Lili Anna Tóth | Hungary | 9:30.96 | PB |
| 8 | Alicja Konieczek | Poland | 9:31.79 | |
| 9 | Anna Emilie Møller | Denmark | 9:31.99 | SB |
| 10 | Alycia Butterworth | Canada | 9:34.25 | |
| 11 | Amy Cashin | Australia | 9:34.67 | |
| 12 | Eilish Flanagan | Ireland | 9.34.86 | PB |
| 13 | Carolina Robles | Spain | 9:45.37 | qR |
| 14 | Adva Cohen | Israel | 10:05.95 | |

=== Final ===
| Rank | Athlete | Nation | Time | Notes |
|---|---|---|---|---|
| 1st place, gold medalist(s) | Peruth Chemutai | Uganda | 9:01.45 | NR |
| 2nd place, silver medalist(s) | Courtney Frerichs | United States | 9:04.79 | SB |
| 3rd place, bronze medalist(s) | Hyvin Kiyeng Jepkemoi | Kenya | 9:05.39 | |
| 4 | Mekides Abebe | Ethiopia | 9:06.16 | |
| 5 | Gesa Felicitas Krause | Germany | 9:14.00 | |
| 6 | Maruša Mišmaš-Zrimšek | Slovenia | 9:14.84 | NR |
| 7 | Beatrice Chepkoech | Kenya | 9:16.33 | |
| 8 | Zerfe Wondemagegn | Ethiopia | 9:16.41 | PB |
| 9 | Elizabeth Bird | Great Britain | 9:19.68 | NR |
| 10 | Winfred Yavi | Bahrain | 9:19.74 | |
| 11 | Geneviève Lalonde | Canada | 9:22.40 | NR |
| 12 | Valerie Constien | United States | 9:31.61 | |
| 13 | Luiza Gega | Albania | 9:34.10 | |
| 14 | Carolina Robles | Spain | 9:50.96 | |
| | Genevieve Gregson | Australia | | DNF |
| | Emma Coburn | United States | | DQ |
