= Alycia Butterworth =

Canadian track and field athlete

Personal information
- Full name: Alycia Kaitlin Butterworth
- Born: October 1, 1992 (age 33) Prince Rupert, British Columbia, Canada
- Home town: Parksville, British Columbia
- Height: 168 cm (5 ft 6 in)

Sport
- University team: Idaho
Medal record
Women's track and field
Representing Canada
Pan American Games
Silver medal – second place	2023 Santiago	3000 m steeplechase

Alycia Kaitlin Butterworth (born October 1, 1992) is a Canadian track and field athlete specializing in the 3000 metres steeplechase event.

== Career ==
Butterworth competed collegiately for the Idaho Vandals in both track and cross country from 2010 to 2015. At the 2017 World Championships in Athletics in London, Butterworth finished 26th in the heats of the 3000 metres steeplechase.

In July 2021, Butterworth was named to Canada's 2020 Olympic team in the women's 3000 metres steeplechase where she finished the games in 24th place. Butterworth attended the 2023 Pan American Games as part of Canada's athletics team, she finished in second place one and half seconds behind Belen Casetta of Argentina to win silver. After the win Butterworth said that "In the final stretch, I was happy I could battle back from third to finish seconds. Santiago did an awesome job hosting."

== Personal ==
Born in Prince Rupert, British Columbia, Butterworth's hometown is Parksville, British Columbia.
