= 2015 European Athletics U23 Championships – Women's 3000 metres steeplechase =

The women's 3000 metres steeplechase event at the 2015 European Athletics U23 Championships was held in Tallinn, Estonia, at Kadriorg Stadium on 9 and 11 July.

== Medalists ==
Gold	Tuğba Güvenç; Turkey
Silver	Maeva Danois; France
Bronze	Emma Oudiou; France

== Results ==
=== Final ===
11 July

Rank	Name	Nationality	Time	Notes
1st place, gold medalist(s)	Tuğba Güvenç	Turkey	9:36.14	
2nd place, silver medalist(s)	Maeva Danois	France	9:40.89	NUR PB
3rd place, bronze medalist(s)	Emma Oudiou	France	9:44.74	PB
4	Camilla Richardsson	Finland	9:46.34	PB
5	Maruša Mišmaš	Slovenia	9:52.03	
6	Maya Rehberg	Germany	9:56.25	SB
7	Yekaterina Ivonina	Russia	9:58.95	
8	Iona Lake	United Kingdom	9:59.83	
9	Nastassia Puzakova	Belarus	10:00.07	
10	Seyran Adanır	Turkey	10:03.06	PB
11	Sabahat Akpinar	Turkey	10:03.52	PB
12	Elizabeth Bird	United Kingdom	10:04.42	
13	Cornelia Griesche	Germany	10:05.47	
14	Monika Hrachovcová	Czech Republic	10:23.25	
15	Elena Panaet	Romania	10:41.86	

=== Heats ===
9 July

==== Heat 1 ====
Rank	Name	Nationality	Time	Notes
1	Tuğba Güvenç	Turkey	9:54.90	Q
2	Emma Oudiou	France	9:55.28	Q
3	Cornelia Griesche	Germany	9:57.75	PB Q
4	Elizabeth Bird	United Kingdom	10:03.69	Q
5	Elena Panaet	Romania	10:04.07	Q
6	Sabahat Akpinar	Turkey	10:10.91	SB q
7	Monika Hrachovcová	Czech Republic	10:11.49	PB q
8	Martina Merlo	Italy	10:15.80	
9	Clara Viñaras	Spain	10:21.32	PB
10	Minttu Hukka	Finland	10:26.39	
11	Olga Vovk	Russia	10:37.32	
12	Julia Millonig	Austria	10:38.35	
13	Daniela Sousa	Portugal	10:42.21	
14	Isabell Norstedt	Sweden	11:08.64	

==== Heat 2 ====
Rank	Name	Nationality	Time	Notes
1	Yekaterina Ivonina	Russia	9:58.13	Q
2	Nastassia Puzakova	Belarus	9:58.29	NUR PB Q
3	Maruša Mišmaš	Slovenia	9:59.23	Q
4	Maeva Danois	France	9:59.48	Q
5	Camilla Richardsson	Finland	9:59.76	SB Q
6	Iona Lake	United Kingdom	9:59.79	q
7	Maya Rehberg	Germany	10:00.06	SB q
8	Seyran Adanır	Turkey	10:06.34	PB q
9	Militsa Mircheva	Bulgaria	10:21.43	PB
10	Tova Eurén	Sweden	10:25.41	
11	Joana Soares	Portugal	10:26.53	PB
12	Paula Gil-Echevarria	Spain	10:31.65	
13	Radka Hanzlová	Czech Republic	10:35.22	
14	Keiti Mets	Estonia	11:06.62	PB

== Participation ==
According to an unofficial count, 28 athletes from 17 countries participated in the event.

- Austria (1)
- Belarus (1)
- Bulgaria (1)
- Czech Republic (2)
- Estonia (1)
- Finland (2)
- France (2)
- Germany (2)
- Italy (1)
- Portugal (2)
- Romania (1)
- Russia (2)
- Slovenia (1)
- Spain (2)
- Sweden (2)
- Turkey (3)
- United Kingdom (2)
