= Athletics at the 2023 Pan American Games – Women's 3000 metres steeplechase =

Women's 3,000 metres steeplechase at the 2023 Pan American Games
- Venue: Julio Martínez National Stadium
- Dates: November 4
- Competitors: 13 from 8 nations
- Winning time: 9:39.47

Medalists
Gold medal	Belén Casetta	Argentina
Silver medal	Alycia Butterworth	Canada
Bronze medal	Tatiane da Silva	Brazil

The women's 3000 metres steeplechase competition of the athletics events at the 2023 Pan American Games was held on November 4 at the Julio Martínez National Stadium.

== Records ==
Prior to this competition, the existing world and Pan American Games records were as follows:

World record	Beatrice Chepkoech (ETH)	8:44.32	Monaco City, Monaco	July 20, 2018
Pan American Games record	Geneviève Lalonde (CAN)	9:41.45	Lima, Peru	August 10, 2019

== Schedule ==
Date	Time	Round
November 4, 2023	19:20	Final

== Results ==
All times shown are in seconds.

KEY:	q	Fastest non-qualifiers	Q	Qualified	NR	National record	PB	Personal best	SB	Seasonal best	DQ	Disqualified

=== Final ===
The results were as follows:

Rank	Name	Nationality	Time	Notes
1st place, gold medalist(s)	Belén Casetta	Argentina	9:39.47	GR
2nd place, silver medalist(s)	Alycia Butterworth	Canada	9:40.86	
3rd place, bronze medalist(s)	Tatiane da Silva	Brazil	9:41.29	
4	Marisa Howard	United States	9:49.27	
5	Kiana Gibson	Canada	9:53.51	
6	Simone Ferraz	Brazil	10:00.62	
7	Logan Jolly	United States	10:03.08	
8	Veronica Huacasi	Peru	10:10.90	
9	Clara Baiocchi	Argentina	10:24.05	
10	Arian Chia	Mexico	10:26.36	
11	María José Calfilaf	Chile	10:26.89	
12	Mirelle Leite	Brazil	10:29.72	
13	Alondra Negrón	Puerto Rico	10:41.13	
