= Athletics at the 2019 Summer Universiade – Women's 3000 metres steeplechase =

The women's 3000 metres steeplechase event at the 2019 Summer Universiade was held on 11 July at the Stadio San Paolo in Naples.

== Results ==
Rank	Name	Nationality	Time	Notes
1st place, gold medalist(s)	Alicja Konieczek	Poland	9:41.46	SB
2nd place, silver medalist(s)	Belén Casetta	Argentina	9:43.05	SB
3rd place, bronze medalist(s)	Meswat Asmare	Ethiopia	9:45.48	PB
4	Chiara Scherrer	Switzerland	9:47.38	SB
5	Brianna Ilarda	Australia	9:53.23	
6	Jessy Lacourse	Canada	10:02.92	
7	Paige Campbell	Australia	10:03.63	
8	Tuğba Güvenç	Turkey	10:08.19	
9	Lisa Rooms	Belgium	10:15.76	PB
10	Komal Chandraka Jagadale	India	10:18.13	PB
11	Catherine Beauchemin	Canada	10:18.67	
12	Jyoti Chouhan	India	10:22.15	PB
13	Carolina Lozano	Argentina	10:26.41	
14	Amelie Svensson	Sweden	10:37.35	
15	Anika Rasubala	United States	11:20.59	
	Sarah Edwards	United States	DNF	
	Achash Kinetibeb	Ethiopia	DNS	

Official Video
