= Marisa Howard =

American steeplechase runner

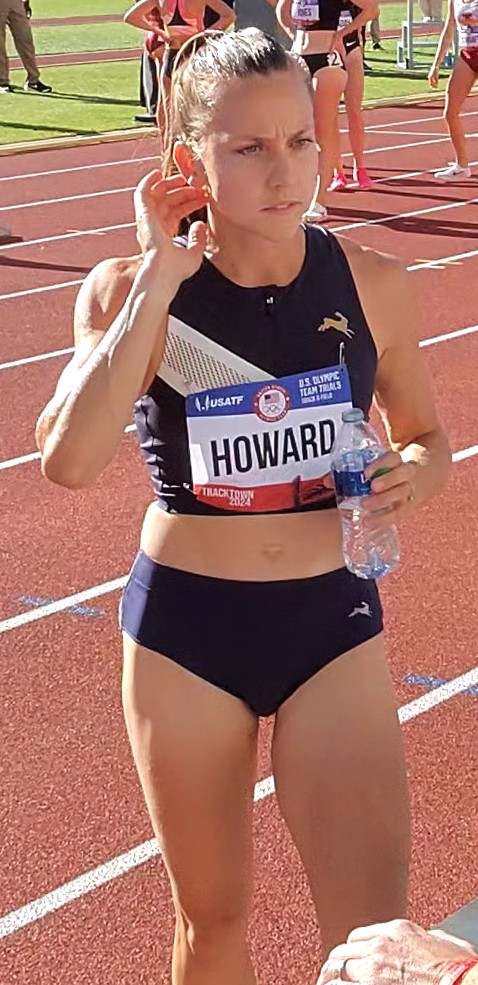
- Howard at the 2024 United States Olympic trials

Personal information
- Born: Marisa Vander Malle; August 10, 1992 (age 33) Pasco, Washington, U.S.
- Home town: Boise, Idaho, U.S.
- Education: Pasco High School (Washington); Boise State University
- Height: 5 ft 2 in (157 cm)

Sport
- Country: United States
- Sport: Track and field
- Event: 3000 metres steeplechase
- Turned pro: 2015
Medal record
Women's athletics
Representing United States
Pan American Games
Silver medal – second place	2019 Lima	3000 m steeplechase

Marisa Howard (/məˈrɪsə/ mə-RISS-ə; née Marisa Vander Malle, born August 10, 1992) is an American athlete who specializes in the 3000 metres steeplechase. In 2024, Howard qualified for the Olympic Games in Paris by placing third at the 2024 U.S. Olympic Trials in the 3000 meters steeplechase. During the 2024 Paris Olympics, Howard placed seventh in the Round 1, Heat 3 with a time of 9:24.78.

Representing Team USA, Howard placed 4th in 3000 m steeplechase at the 2023 Pan American Games and she won the silver medal in the women's 3000 metres steeplechase at the 2019 Pan American Games held in Lima, Peru.

== Career ==
Howard became a Boise State University cross country/track coach, then a school nurse in Boise. After participating at the 2024 Paris Olympic Games, she will join the Boise State track and field and cross-country staff as an assistant coach.

=== Education ===
Howard received a bachelor's degree in nursing from Boise State University in Boise, Idaho in 2015 and is now pursuing a master's degree in nutrition and human performance.

=== Olympics ===
In 2024, Howard qualified for the Olympic Games in Paris by placing third at the 2024 U.S. Olympic Trials in the 3000 meters steeplechase with a personal best of 9:07.14. The two other USA qualifying athletes were Courtney Wayment and Valerie Constien. Pat McCurry is her personal coach.

During the 2024 Paris Olympics, Howard placed 7th in the Round 1, Heat 3 with a time of 9:24.78.

=== NCAA ===
Marisa Vander Malle become Marisa Howard while a Boise State Broncos in the summer of 2013. Howard is a 3-time NCAA Division I All-American distance runner and turned professional after her podium finish at 2015 NCAA Division I Outdoor Track and Field Championships in the steeplechase. Howard finished her Boise State career with four individual Mountain West Championships titles and 11 All-Mountain West Conference Championships honors.
