= Tatiane Raquel da Silva =

Brazilian runner

Tatiane da Silva
Personal information
- Born: 10 June 1990 (age 36) Londrina, Brazil
- Education: Guairacá Faculty
- Height: 1.70 m (5 ft 7 in)
- Weight: 57 kg (126 lb)

Sport
- Sport: Athletics
- Event: 3000 m steeplechase
Medal record
Women's athletics
Representing Brazil
Pan American Games
Bronze medal – third place	2023 Santiago	3000 m steeplechase

Tatiane Raquel da Silva (born 10 June 1990) is a Brazilian runner competing primarily in the 3000 metres steeplechase. She has won multiple medals at regional level.

At the 2020 Olympic Games in Tokyo, she broke the Brazilian record in the 3000 metres steeplechase, with a time of 9:36.43.

On June 11, 2022, she broke the South American record for the 3000 metres steeplechase with a time of 9:24.38.

== Personal bests ==
Outdoor

- 800 metres – 2:06.81 (Uberlandia 2014)
- 1500 metres – 4:13.38 (Rio de Janeiro 2022)
- 3000 metres – 9:18.39 (Trujillo 2018)
- 5000 metres – 15:53.72 (Torrance 2017)
- 10,000 metres – 33:16.17 (Palo Alto 2018)
- 3000 metres steeplechase – 9:24.38 (Watford 2022)

== International competitions ==
Year	Competition	Venue	Position	Event	Notes
Representing Brazil
2004	South American Youth Championships	Guayaquil, Ecuador	3rd	2000 m s'chase	7:08.5
2006	South American Youth Championships	Caracas, Venezuela	1st	2000 m s'chase	6:57.72
2009	South American Junior Championships	São Paulo, Brazil	3rd	3000 m s'chase	11:31.94
2012	South American U23 Championships	São Paulo, Brazil	3rd	3000 m s'chase	10:45.08
2014	Ibero-American Championships	São Paulo, Brazil	6th	800 m	2:07.61
2014	Ibero-American Championships	São Paulo, Brazil	6th	3000 m s'chase	10:17.00
2015	South American Championships	Lima, Peru	2nd	3000 m s'chase	9:56.8
2015	Pan American Games	Toronto, Canada	6th	3000 m s'chase	10:10.73
2016	Ibero-American Championships	Rio de Janeiro, Brazil	2nd	3000 m s'chase	9:46.86
2017	South American Championships	Asunción, Paraguay	3rd	3000 m s'chase	10:34.23
2017	Universiade	Taipei, Taiwan	9th	3000 m s'chase	10:22.21
2018	Ibero-American Championships	Trujillo, Peru	2nd	3000 m	9:18.39
2018	Ibero-American Championships	Trujillo, Peru	1st	3000 m s'chase	9:48.40
2019	South American Championships	Lima, Peru	1st	3000 m s'chase	9:45.52
2019	Pan American Games	Lima, Peru	4th	3000 m s'chase	9:56.19
2021	South American Championships	Guayaquil, Ecuador	1st	3000 m s'chase	9:38.71
2021	Olympic Games	Tokyo, Japan	28th (h)	3000 m s'chase	9:36.43
2022	Ibero-American Championships	La Nucía, Spain	3rd	3000 m s'chase	9:42.06
2022	World Championships	Eugene, United States	23rd (h)	3000 m s'chase	9:26.25
2023	South American Championships	São Paulo, Brazil	1st	3000 m s'chase	9:55.73
2023	World Championships	Budapest, Hungary	35th (h)	3000 m s'chase	10:19.80
2023	Pan American Games	Santiago, Chile	3rd	3000 m s'chase	9:41.29
2024	Ibero-American Championships	Cuiabá, Brazil	1st	3000 m s'chase	9:46.25
2024	Olympic Games	Paris, France	33rd (h)	3000 m s'chase	9:33.96
2025	South American Championships	Mar del Plata, Argentina	7th	5000 m	16:26.12
2025	South American Championships	Mar del Plata, Argentina	1st	3000 m s'chase	9:40.07
2026	Ibero-American Championships	Lima, Peru	2nd	3000 m s'chase	9:43.12
2026	South American Games	Santa Fe, Argentina	3rd	1500 m	4:23.42
2026	South American Games	Santa Fe, Argentina	2nd	3000 m s'chase	9:44.10
