= 2022 Ibero-American Championships in Athletics – Results =

These are the official results of the 2022 Ibero-American Championships in Athletics which took place on May 20, 21 and 22, 2022, at the Estadi Olímpic Camilo Cano in La Nucía, Spain, except for the half marathon which was held in Torrevella, Spain.

== Men's results ==
=== 100 meters ===
Heats – May 20
Wind:
Heat 1: +0.5 m/s, Heat 2: +1.4 m/s, Heat 3: +2.2 m/s

Rank	Heat	Name	Nationality	Time	Notes
1	2	Erik Cardoso	Brazil	10.22	Q
1	3	Felipe Bardi	Brazil	10.22	Q
3	1	Shainer Reginfo	Cuba	10.27	Q
4	1	Sergio López	Spain	10.32	Q, SB
4	2	Franco Florio	Argentina	10.32	Q, SB
6	1	Christopher Valdez	Dominican Republic	10.34	q, SB
7	3	David Vivas	Venezuela	10.36	Q
8	3	Alberto Calero	Spain	10.37	q
9	3	Carlos Palacios	Colombia	10.40	
10	2	André Prazeres	Portugal	10.41	SB
11	2	Abdel Kalil	Venezuela	10.47	
12	1	Carlos Nascimento	Portugal	10.65	SB
13	3	Katriel Angulo	Ecuador	10.67	
14	1	Ramiro Álvarez	Honduras	11.15	
15	1	Guillem Arderiu	Andorra	11.39	SB
16	2	Mikel de Sa	Andorra	11.42	
17	3	Gregorio Ndong	Equatorial Guinea	11.70	
	2	José González	Dominican Republic	DQ	FS

Final – May 20

Wind: +0.1 m/s

Rank	Lane	Name	Nationality	Time	Notes
1st place, gold medalist(s)	3	Shainer Reginfo	Cuba	10.15	
2nd place, silver medalist(s)	4	Felipe Bardi	Brazil	10.26	
3rd place, bronze medalist(s)	5	Franco Florio	Argentina	10.31	SB
4	6	Erik Cardoso	Brazil	10.32	
5	7	Sergio López	Spain	10.33	
6	2	Christopher Valdez	Dominican Republic	10.34	SB
7	8	David Vivas	Venezuela	10.48	
8	1	Alberto Calero	Spain	10.58	

=== 200 meters ===
Heats – May 21
Wind:
Heat 1: -0.8 m/s, Heat 2: -0.3 m/s

Rank	Heat	Name	Nationality	Time	Notes
1	2	Alexander Ogando	Dominican Republic	20.38	Q
2	1	Yancarlos Martínez	Dominican Republic	20.66	Q, SB
3	1	Lucas da Silva	Brazil	20.94	Q
4	2	Shainer Reginfo	Cuba	21.03	Q
5	1	Jesús Gómez	Spain	21.28	Q, SB
6	1	Delvis Santos	Portugal	21.44	q
7	2	Abdel Kalil	Venezuela	21.48	Q
8	1	Rafael Vásquez	Venezuela	21.52	q
9	2	Carlos Palacios	Colombia	21.57	
10	2	Wilson Pedro	Portugal	21.70	PB
11	2	Steeven Salas	Ecuador	22.02	
12	2	Iñigo Pérez	Honduras	22.04	
13	1	Pau Blasi	Andorra	22.62	SB
14	2	Guillem Arderiu	Andorra	22.67	SB
	1	Katriel Angulo	Ecuador	DNS	

Final – May 22

Wind: -2.1 m/s

Rank	Lane	Name	Nationality	Time	Notes
1st place, gold medalist(s)	4	Alexander Ogando	Dominican Republic	20.27	
2nd place, silver medalist(s)	5	Yancarlos Martínez	Dominican Republic	20.60	SB
3rd place, bronze medalist(s)	3	Shainer Reginfo	Cuba	21.01	
4	7	Jesús Gómez	Spain	21.31	
5	2	Delvis Santos	Portugal	21.33	
6	8	Abdel Kalil	Venezuela	21.70	
7	1	Rafael Vásquez	Venezuela	21.77	
8	6	Lucas da Silva	Brazil	DQ	

=== 400 meters ===
Heats – May 20

Rank	Heat	Name	Nationality	Time	Notes
1	2	Lidio Andrés Feliz	Dominican Republic	45.71	Q
2	2	João Coelho	Portugal	45.85	Q, PB
3	2	Elián Larregina	Argentina	46.30	Q, SB
4	1	Luguelín Santos	Dominican Republic	46.47	Q
5	1	Manuel Guijarro	Spain	46.48	Q, SB
6	2	Valente Mendoza	Mexico	46.56	q, SB
7	2	Samuel García	Spain	46.64	q, SB
8	1	Vitor de Miranda	Brazil	46.72	Q
9	1	Javier Gómez	Venezuela	46.77	
10	1	Francisco Tejeda	Ecuador	47.08	
11	1	Ricardo dos Santos	Portugal	47.16	
12	2	Steeven Salas	Ecuador	47.89	
13	2	Iñigo Pérez	Honduras	48.09	
14	1	Pau Blasi	Andorra	49.71	
	1	Adiven Neves	Cape Verde	DNS	

Final – May 21

Rank	Lane	Name	Nationality	Time	Notes
1st place, gold medalist(s)	6	Lidio Andrés Feliz	Dominican Republic	44.64	CR
2nd place, silver medalist(s)	3	Luguelín Santos	Dominican Republic	45.50	SB
3rd place, bronze medalist(s)	8	Elián Larregina	Argentina	45.78	NR
4	4	João Coelho	Portugal	45.88	
5	7	Vitor de Miranda	Brazil	46.11	
6	5	Manuel Guijarro	Spain	46.20	SB
7	1	Valente Mendoza	Mexico	46.51	SB
8	2	Samuel García	Spain	46.92	

=== 800 meters ===
Heats – May 20

Rank	Heat	Lane	Name	Nationality	Time	Notes
1	1	2	José Carlos Pinto	Portugal	1:48.18	Q
2	1	4	Guilherme Kurtz	Brazil	1:48.28	Q
3	1	3	Pablo Sánchez-Valladares	Spain	1:48.37	Q
4	1	6	Diego Lacamoire	Argentina	1:48.63	q
5	1	7	Jhonatan Rodríguez	Colombia	1:48.67	q, SB
6	2	5	Álvaro de Arriba	Spain	1:48.99	Q, SB
7	1	1	Ferdy Agramonte	Dominican Republic	1:49.15	
8	2	2	Ryan Sánchez	Puerto Rico	1:49.41	Q, SB
9	2	6	José Antonio Maita	Venezuela	1:49.45	Q
10	2	3	Pol Moya	Andorra	1:49.51	SB
11	2	4	Eduardo Moreira	Brazil	1:49.59	
12	1	8	Adiven Neves	Cape Verde	1:50.09	PB
13	2	1	Nuno Pereira	Portugal	1:50.36	SB
14	1	5	Rafael Muñoz	Chile	1:51.59	
15	2	7	Jelssin Robledo	Colombia	1:53.19	

Final – May 22

Rank	Lane	Name	Nationality	Time	Notes
1st place, gold medalist(s)	6	Álvaro de Arriba	Spain	1:45.19	SB
2nd place, silver medalist(s)	2	José Antonio Maita	Venezuela	1:46.22	PB
3rd place, bronze medalist(s)	3	José Carlos Pinto	Portugal	1:46.61	PB
4	4	Guilherme Kurtz	Brazil	1:46.80	
5	5	Ryan Sánchez	Puerto Rico	1:47.48	
6	1	Jhonatan Rodríguez	Colombia	1:47.57	SB
7	7	Diego Lacamoire	Argentina	1:48.19	
8	8	Pablo Sánchez-Valladares	Spain	1:49.94	

=== 1500 metres ===
May 22

Rank	Name	Nationality	Time	Notes
1st place, gold medalist(s)	Isaac Nader	Portugal	3:43.86	
2nd place, silver medalist(s)	José Zabala	Argentina	3:44.45	
3rd place, bronze medalist(s)	Pol Moya	Andorra	3:44.64	SB
4	Esteban González	Chile	3:44.78	
5	Sergio Paniagua	Spain	3:44.91	SB
6	Lucirio Antonio Garrido	Venezuela	3:45.97	
7	Diego Uribe	Chile	3:46.12	
8	Sebastián López	Venezuela	3:46.24	PB
9	Carlos Santos	Brazil	3:47.59	SB
10	Eduardo Gregorio	Uruguay	3:49.26	
	Matheus Borges	Brazil	DNS	
	Walter Nina	Peru	DNS	

=== 5000 metres ===
May 22

Rank	Name	Nationality	Time	Notes
1st place, gold medalist(s)	Carlos Mayo	Spain	13:51.12	SB
2nd place, silver medalist(s)	Carlos Díaz	Chile	13:51.97	
3rd place, bronze medalist(s)	Marcos Molina	Argentina	13:52.50	
4	Raúl Celada	Spain	13:56.31	
5	Ignacio Velásquez	Chile	14:03.13	
6	Vidal Basco	Bolivia	14:05.90	
7	Ignacio Erario	Argentina	14:09.01	
8	Héctor Pagán	Puerto Rico	14:09.34	PB
9	Abraham Hernández	Mexico	14:09.89	SB
10	Wendell Souza	Brazil	14:10.80	PB
11	Rafael Loza	Ecuador	14:11.35	PB
12	Walter Nina	Peru	14:12.95	
13	Ederson Pereira	Brazil	14:16.16	
14	Cristhian Zamora	Uruguay	14:18.02	
15	Martín Cuestas	Uruguay	14:33.01	
16	Carles Gómez	Andorra	14:53.11	
	Julio Palomino	Peru	DNF	
	Alfredo Santana	Puerto Rico	DNS	

=== Half marathon ===
May 22

Rank	Name	Nationality	Time	Notes
1st place, gold medalist(s)	Luis Ostos	Peru	1:04:46	8TA, Rt.55.8.8
2nd place, silver medalist(s)	Antonio Poblete	Argentina	1:04:47	
3rd place, bronze medalist(s)	Jorge Blanco	Spain	1:05:26	SB
4	Andralino Semedo	Cape Verde	1:06:39	SB
5	Miguel Barzola	Argentina	1:06:59	SB
6	Édson Amaro Santos	Brazil	1:07:25	SB
7	Andrés Zamora	Uruguay	1:07:52	
8	Hugo Catrileo	Chile	1:08:22	
9	Ivan Zarco	Honduras	1:10:30	SB
10	Wellington Bezerra da Silva	Brazil	1:10:37	SB
11	Francesc Carmona	Andorra	1:13:59	
	Nicolás Cuestas	Uruguay	DNF	
	Cristian Vasconez	Ecuador	DQ	R55.10

=== 110 meters hurdles ===
Heats – May 21
Wind:
Heat 1: -0.9 m/s, Heat 2: -1.0 m/s

Rank	Heat	Name	Nationality	Time	Notes
1	1	Eduardo de Deus	Brazil	13.58	Q
2	2	Rafael Pereira	Brazil	13.60	Q
3	2	Daniel Cisneros	Spain	13.68	Q
4	1	João Vitor Oliveira	Portugal	14.09	Q, SB
5	1	Martín Sáenz	Chile	14.29	Q
6	2	Abdel Larrinaga	Portugal	15.20	Q
7	2	Lander Teixeira	Andorra	17.04	q, PB
	1	Pol Herreros	Andorra	DQ	R22.6.2
	2	Fanor Escobar	Colombia	DQ	R22.6.2
	1	Orlando Ortega	Spain	DNS	

Final – May 22

Wind: +0.3 m/s

Rank	Lane	Name	Nationality	Time	Notes
1st place, gold medalist(s)	4	Rafael Pereira	Brazil	13.47	
2nd place, silver medalist(s)	3	Daniel Cisneros	Spain	13.53	13.526, PB
3rd place, bronze medalist(s)	6	Eduardo de Deus	Brazil	13.53	13.530
4	5	João Vitor Oliveira	Portugal	13.95	SB
5	7	Martín Sáenz	Chile	16.29	
6	2	Lander Teixeira	Andorra	17.38	
	8	Abdel Larrinaga	Portugal	DNF	

=== 400 meters hurdles ===
Heats – May 20

Rank	Heat	Name	Nationality	Time	Notes
1	1	Gerald Drummond	Costa Rica	50.66	Q
2	1	Iker Alfonso	Spain	50.79	Q
3	2	Alfredo Sepúlveda	Chile	50.97	Q, SB
4	2	Jesús David Delgado	Spain	50.98	Q
5	2	Juander Santos	Dominican Republic	51.04	Q, SB
6	1	Márcio Teles	Brazil	51.56	Q, SB
7	2	Mahau Suguimati	Brazil	52.16	q, SB
8	2	Egbert Espinoza	Venezuela	52.69	q
9	1	César Parra	Venezuela	52.96	
10	2	Eloi Vilella	Andorra	56.12	PB
	1	Robert King	Dominican Republic	DNF	

Final – May 21

Rank	Lane	Name	Nationality	Time	Notes
1st place, gold medalist(s)	5	Gerald Drummond	Costa Rica	48.87	NR
2nd place, silver medalist(s)	7	Juander Santos	Dominican Republic	49.74	SB
3rd place, bronze medalist(s)	4	Jesús David Delgado	Spain	49.82	SB
4	6	Alfredo Sepúlveda	Chile	50.35	SB
5	3	Iker Alfonso	Spain	50.59	PB
6	8	Márcio Teles	Brazil	51.50	SB
7	2	Mahau Suguimati	Brazil	52.90	
8	1	Egbert Espinoza	Venezuela	53.90	

=== 3000 meters steeplechase ===
May 20

Rank	Name	Nationality	Time	Notes
1st place, gold medalist(s)	Gonzalo Parra	Spain	8:34.85	SB
2nd place, silver medalist(s)	Nahuel Carabaña	Andorra	8:35.19	NR
3rd place, bronze medalist(s)	Marcos Molina	Argentina	8:35.40	SB
4	Julio Palomino	Peru	8:41.91	PB
5	Etson Barros	Portugal	8:43.32	SB
6	José Peña	Venezuela	8:46.81	SB
7	Carlos San Martín	Colombia	8:47.27	
8	Joaquín Arbe	Argentina	8:48.23	SB
9	Vidal Basco	Bolivia	8:52.18	PB
10	Jean Carlos Machado	Brazil	9:00.15	SB
11	José González	Venezuela	9:01.38	SB
12	Matheus Borges	Brazil	9:04.65	
13	Pol Oriach	Spain	9:12.24	
	Miguel Borges	Portugal	DNF	
	Víctor Ortiz	Puerto Rico	DNF	

=== 4 × 100 meters relay ===
May 21

Rank	Lane	Nation	Competitors	Time	Notes
1st place, gold medalist(s)	5	Spain	Bernat Canet, Jesús Gómez, Daniel Rodríguez, Sergio López	39.03	SB
2nd place, silver medalist(s)	6	Dominican Republic	Christopher Valdez, Alexander Ogando, José González, Yancarlos Martínez	39.19	SB
3rd place, bronze medalist(s)	4	Brazil	Gabriel Luiz Boza, Felipe Bardi dos Santos, Erik Cardoso, Lucas da Silva	39.32	SB
4	2	Venezuela	David Vivas, Rafael Vásquez, Abdel Kalil, Carlos Belisario	40.11	
5	7	Andorra	Eloi Vilella, Mikel de Sa, Pau Blasi, Guillem Arderiu	43.28	SB
	3	Portugal	Carlos Nascimento, Wilson Pedro, Delvis Santos, André Prazeres	DNF	

=== 4 × 400 meters relay ===
May 22

Rank	Lane	Nation	Competitors	Time	Notes
1st place, gold medalist(s)	8	Dominican Republic	Robert King, Alexander Ogando, Luguelín Santos, Lidio Feliz	3:00.98	SB
2nd place, silver medalist(s)	6	Spain	Iñaki Cañal, Samuel García, Oscar Husillos, Manuel Guijarro	3:04.05	SB
3rd place, bronze medalist(s)	3	Portugal	João Coelho, José Carlos Pinto, Ricardo dos Santos, Mauro Pereira	3:07.23	SB
4	4	Venezuela	Egbert Espinoza, José Maita, César Parra, Javier Gómez	3:09.19	SB
5	7	Brazil	José Fernando Ferreira, Eduardo Moreira, Mahau Suguimati, Vitor de Miranda	3:10.12	SB
6	5	Andorra	Pau Blasi, Pol Moya, Eloi Vilella, Pol Herreros	3:26.02	SB

=== 10,000 metres walk ===
May 21

Rank	Name	Nationality	Time	Penalties	Notes
1st place, gold medalist(s)	Álvaro Martín	Spain	39:24.20	~	CR
2nd place, silver medalist(s)	Caio Bonfim	Brazil	39:57.59		PB
3rd place, bronze medalist(s)	César Rodríguez	Peru	40:13.10	~~	SB
4	Iván López	Spain	40:17.60		SB
5	Brian Pintado	Ecuador	40:17.60		
6	Matheus Corrêa	Brazil	41:20.76	>~~P	SB
7	Juan Manuel Cano	Argentina	41:32.71	~	PB
	Leonidas Romero	Honduras	DNF		
	Luis Henry Campos	Peru	DNF	~>	
	Andrés Chocho	Ecuador	DNF	~	

=== High jump ===
May 21

Rank	Name	Nationality	1.90	1.95	2.00	2.05	2.10	2.15	2.18	2.21	2.24	2.26	2.28	Result	Notes
1st place, gold medalist(s)	Edgar Rivera	Mexico	–	–	–	–	o	o	o	xo	o	o	xxx	2.26	SB
2nd place, silver medalist(s)	Thiago Moura	Brazil	–	–	–	–	o	o	o	xo	xo	xo	xxx	2.26	
3rd place, bronze medalist(s)	Fernando Ferreira	Brazil	–	–	–	o	o	o	o	o	xxx			2.21	
4	Gerson Baldé	Portugal	–	–	–	o	o	xo	o	xo	xxx			2.21	
5	Carlos Layoy	Argentina	–	–	–	o	o	xo	o	xxx				2.18	
6	Nicolás Numair	Chile	–	–	o	o	xo	xo	xo	xxx				2.18	PB
7	Luis Castro	Puerto Rico	–	–	–	–	xo	o	xxx					2.15	
8	Xesc Tresens	Spain	–	–	o	o	xo	xxo	–	xxx				2.15	
9	Pedro Álamos	Chile	–	–	–	o	xo	xxx						2.10	
10	Arturo Chávez	Peru	–	o	o	o	xxx							2.05	
	Dmytro Zuiev*	Ukraine	o	o	o	xxx								2.00	PB
	Erick Portillo	Mexico												DNS	

=== Pole vault ===
May 21

Rank	Name	Nationality	4.60	4.80	5.00	5.20	5.25	5.30	5.35	5.40	5.45	5.51	Result	Notes
1st place, gold medalist(s)	Didac Salas	Spain	–	–	xxo	–	xo	–	x–	xo	–	xxx	5.40	SB
2nd place, silver medalist(s)	Rubem Miranda	Portugal	–	–	o	o	–	xo	o	xxx			5.35	SB
3rd place, bronze medalist(s)	Germán Chiaraviglio	Argentina	–	–	–	o	–	o	–	xx–	x		5.30	SB
4	Pedro Buaró	Portugal	–	–	o	xo	–	xxx					5.20	SB
5	Austin Ramos	Ecuador	–	–	xo	xo	–	xxx					5.20	PB
6	Dyander Pacho	Ecuador	–	–	o	xxx							5.00	
7	Alex Gracia	Spain	–	xo	xo	xxx							5.00	
	José Fernando Ferreira	Brazil	xxx										NM	
	Miquel Vilchez	Andorra	xxx										NM	

=== Long jump ===
May 20

Rank	Name	Nationality	#1	#2	#3	#4	#5	#6	Result	Notes
1st place, gold medalist(s)	Eusebio Cáceres	Spain	x	8.05	x	x	x	x	8.05	SB
2nd place, silver medalist(s)	Maykel Massó	Cuba	7.33	8.02	7.94	7.90	8.03	7.75	8.03	SB
3rd place, bronze medalist(s)	Héctor Santos	Spain	7.71	7.86	7.88	6.28	7.84	7.97	7.97	
4	Emiliano Lasa	Uruguay	7.96	7.74	x	7.79	7.90	7.88	7.96	
5	José Luis Mandros	Peru	x	7.83	7.72	x	x	7.89	7.89	
6	Maikel Vidal	Cuba	7.89	x	7.74	7.62	7.70w	7.46	7.89	
7	Gabriel Luiz Boza	Brazil	7.22	x	7.50	x	7.78	7.37	7.78	
8	André Pimienta	Portugal	x	7.40	7.33	7.27	7.30	x	7.40	
9	Alexsandro de Melo	Brazil	7.40	x	7.29				7.40	
10	Gregorio Ndong	Equatorial Guinea	6.26	6.15	6.41w				6.41w	
	Santiago Cova	Venezuela	x	x	x				NM	

=== Triple jump ===
May 21

Rank	Name	Nationality	#1	#2	#3	#4	#5	#6	Result	Notes
1st place, gold medalist(s)	Lázaro Martínez	Cuba	x	16.35	17.30	–	x	–	17.30	CR
2nd place, silver medalist(s)	Marcos Ruiz	Spain	x	16.94	16.63	–	x	16.80	16.94	PB
3rd place, bronze medalist(s)	Tiago Luis Pereira	Portugal	15.84	16.29	16.71	x	–	16.42	16.71	SB
4	Almir dos Santos	Brazil	x	16.59	–	–	–	–	16.59	
5	Leodan Torrealba	Venezuela	16.42	16.32	16.38	16.39	16.21	x	16.42	
6	José Emilio Bellido	Spain	15.58	16.02	x	x	x	x	16.02	SB
7	Maximiliano Díaz	Argentina	16.01	14.76	15.98	x	15.72	x	16.01	
8	Alexsandro Melo	Brazil	15.51	15.71	x	15.41	–	–	15.71	

=== Shot put ===
May 22

Rank	Name	Nationality	#1	#2	#3	#4	#5	#6	Result	Notes
1st place, gold medalist(s)	Darlan Romani	Brazil	21.15	21.70	21.39	21.21	21.69	21.20	21.70	CR
2nd place, silver medalist(s)	Welington Morais	Brazil	20.50	x	20.54	20.78	20.33	x	20.78	PB
3rd place, bronze medalist(s)	Tsanko Arnaudov	Portugal	19.93	20.22	20.14	x	x	20.43	20.43	SB
4	Carlos Tobalina	Spain	20.20	19.80	x	20.12	20.06	19.34	20.20	
5	Juan Ignacio Carballo	Argentina	18.89	20.04	19.56	19.89	19.25	19.64	20.04	PB

=== Discus throw ===
May 21

Rank	Name	Nationality	#1	#2	#3	#4	#5	#6	Result	Notes
1st place, gold medalist(s)	Lucas Nervi	Chile	58.44	59.32	60.58	59.70	59.36	60.44	60.58	
2nd place, silver medalist(s)	Wellinton da Cruz Filho	Brazil	x	x	51.27	55.33	57.09	x	57.09	
3rd place, bronze medalist(s)	Emanuel Sousa	Portugal	50.19	x	x	56.68	x	53.80	56.68	
4	Lois Maikel Martínez	Spain	56.08	x	x	55.50	56.35	54.78	56.35	
5	Juan José Caicedo	Ecuador	53.96	55.79	x	x	55.58	55.74	55.79	
6	Edujose Lima	Portugal	x	x	53.78	52.60	52.85	52.49	53.78	
7	Douglas dos Reis	Brazil	51.07	53.21	52.41	53.19	51.79	51.91	53.21	SB

=== Hammer throw ===
May 20

Rank	Name	Nationality	#1	#2	#3	#4	#5	#6	Result	Notes
1st place, gold medalist(s)	Javier Cienfuegos	Spain	74.23	x	x	74.70	x	74.16	74.70	
2nd place, silver medalist(s)	Gabriel Kehr	Chile	x	x	74.61	73.46	72.87	73.41	74.61	
3rd place, bronze medalist(s)	Humberto Mansilla	Chile	69.71	x	x	73.14	73.00	x	73.14	
4	Allan Wolski	Brazil	70.74	x	71.13	71.50	72.24	71.40	72.24	
5	Rúben Antunes	Portugal	70.75	70.94	69.29	x	68.47	x	70.94	SB
6	Joaquín Gómez	Argentina	64.07	67.56	x	68.06	–	–	68.06	
7	Luís Gustavo da Silva	Brazil	x	64.28	67.38	67.04	67.97	64.98	67.97	SB
8	Elías Díaz	Colombia	x	62.21	x	63.63	61.49	x	63.63	

=== Javelin throw ===
May 22

Rank	Name	Nationality	#1	#2	#3	#4	#5	#6	Result	Notes
1st place, gold medalist(s)	Leandro Ramos	Portugal	72.44	x	80.29	78.43	81.37	x	81.37	
2nd place, silver medalist(s)	Pedro Henrique Rodrigues	Brazil	76.16	79.72	80.74	75.39	x	x	80.74	PB
3rd place, bronze medalist(s)	Luiz Maurício da Silva	Brazil	80.41	75.52	74.53	76.83	76.42	78.85	80.41	PB
4	Manu Quijera	Spain	77.81	78.68	78.25	78.12	77.51	79.83	79.83	PB
5	Billy Julio	Colombia	x	75.53	77.65	75.99	73.51	x	77.65	
6	Lautaro Techera	Uruguay	62.43	66.85	70.03	65.96	67.40	66.46	70.03	NR
7	Félix Torres	Puerto Rico	64.27	x	x	64.50	x	62.83	64.50	

=== Decathlon ===
May 20–21

The highest mark recorded in each event is highlighted in yellow

Rank	Athlete	Nationality	100m	LJ	SP	HJ	400m	110m H	DT	PV	JT	1500m	Points	Notes
1st place, gold medalist(s)	Gerson Izaguirre	Venezuela	10.85	7.33	14.50	1.95	50.40	14.26	44.16	4.50	53.13	4:46.37	7827	
2nd place, silver medalist(s)	Edgar Campré	Portugal	10.64	7.10	13.21	1.86	48.49	14.09	43.27	4.70	51.43	4:56.42	7729	
3rd place, bronze medalist(s)	Bruno Comin	Spain	10.81	7.19	13.64	2.01	48.85	14.78	42.20	4.30	48.99	4:43.59	7668	SB
	José Fernando Ferreira	Brazil	DNS	–	–	–	–	–	–	–	–	–	DNS	

== Women's results ==
=== 100 meters ===
Heats – May 20
Wind:
Heat 1: +1.1 m/s, Heat 2: +1.7 m/s

Rank	Heat	Name	Nationality	Time	Notes
1	2	Vitória Cristina Rosa	Brazil	11.15	Q
2	2	María Isabel Pérez	Spain	11.25	Q, PB
3	1	Lorène Bazolo	Portugal	11.26	Q, SB
4	1	Anahí Suárez	Ecuador	11.34	Q
5	1	Paula Sevilla	Spain	11.35	Q, PB
6	1	Ana Cláudia Lemos	Brazil	11.37	q
7	2	Ángela Tenorio	Ecuador	11.46	Q
8	2	Rosalina Santos	Portugal	11.50	q, SB
9	1	María Ignacia Montt	Chile	11.51	PB
10	1	María Florencia Lamboglia	Argentina	11.57	PB
11	2	Martha Méndez	Dominican Republic	11.58	PB
12	2	Michaela Rodrigues	Cape Verde	11.91	NR
13	2	Laura Martínez	Colombia	12.04	
14	2	Alma de Miguel Evuna	Equatorial Guinea	12.34	PB
15	1	Erica Mouwangui	Equatorial Guinea	13.30	

Final – May 20

Wind: -0.2 m/s

Rank	Lane	Name	Nationality	Time	Notes
1st place, gold medalist(s)	4	Vitória Cristina Rosa	Brazil	11.22	
2nd place, silver medalist(s)	5	Lorène Bazolo	Portugal	11.36	
3rd place, bronze medalist(s)	6	María Isabel Pérez	Spain	11.48	
4	7	Paula Sevilla	Spain	11.48	
5	3	Anahí Suárez	Ecuador	11.51	
6	8	Ángela Tenorio	Ecuador	11.53	
7	2	Ana Cláudia Lemos	Brazil	11.57	
8	1	Rosalina Santos	Portugal	11.71	

=== 200 meters ===
Heats – May 21
Wind:
Heat 1: -0.4 m/s, Heat 2: -2.2 m/s

Rank	Heat	Name	Nationality	Time	Notes
1	1	Lorène Bazolo	Portugal	23.42	Q, SB
2	2	Vitória Cristina Rosa	Brazil	23.44	Q
3	1	Lorraine Martins	Brazil	23.45	Q
4	1	Lucia Carrillo	Spain	23.61	Q, SB
5	1	María Florencia Lamboglia	Argentina	23.84	q, SB
6	1	Martha Méndez	Dominican Republic	23.93	q, PB
7	2	Anahí Suárez	Ecuador	23.93	Q
8	2	Rosalina Santos	Portugal	24.30	Q
	1	Anastasiia Bryzhina*	Ukraine	24.33	SB
9	1	María Ignacia Montt	Chile	24.42	
10	2	Laura Martínez	Colombia	24.89	
11	2	Michaela Rodrigues	Cape Verde	25.23	
12	2	Alma Evuna	Equatorial Guinea	26.14	
	1	Ángela Tenorio	Ecuador	DNS	
	2	Anabel Medina	Dominican Republic	DNS	

Final – May 22

Wind: -2.5 m/s

Rank	Lane	Name	Nationality	Time	Notes
1st place, gold medalist(s)	3	Vitória Cristina Rosa	Brazil	23.53	
2nd place, silver medalist(s)	5	Lorène Bazolo	Portugal	23.67	
3rd place, bronze medalist(s)	6	Lorraine Martins	Brazil	23.80	
4	7	Lucia Carrillo	Spain	23.82	
5	4	Anahí Suárez	Ecuador	23.87	
6	8	Rosalina Santos	Portugal	24.08	
7	2	María Florencia Lamboglia	Argentina	24.19	
8	1	Martha Méndez	Dominican Republic	24.33	

=== 400 meters ===
Heats – May 20

Rank	Heat	Name	Nationality	Time	Notes
1	2	Marileidy Paulino	Dominican Republic	50.82	Q, SB
2	1	Gabriella Scott	Puerto Rico	51.65	Q, PB
3	1	Fiordaliza Cofil	Dominican Republic	51.66	Q
4	1	Roxana Gómez	Cuba	51.68	Q, SB
5	1	Tiffani Marinho	Brazil	52.26	q, SB
6	2	Cátia Azevedo	Portugal	52.37	Q, SB
7	1	Martina Weil	Chile	52.90	q, SB
8	2	Tábata de Carvalho	Brazil	53.48	Q, SB
9	2	Paola Morán	Mexico	53.83	
10	2	Eliani Casi	Cuba	54.37	

Final – May 21

Rank	Lane	Name	Nationality	Time	Notes
1st place, gold medalist(s)	6	Marileidy Paulino	Dominican Republic	49.49	CR
2nd place, silver medalist(s)	5	Fiordaliza Cofil	Dominican Republic	50.64	PB
3rd place, bronze medalist(s)	8	Roxana Gómez	Cuba	51.03	SB
4	3	Gabriella Scott	Puerto Rico	51.42	PB
5	4	Cátia Azevedo	Portugal	51.58	SB
6	7	Tiffani Marinho	Brazil	52.42	
7	6	Tábata de Carvalho	Brazil	52.66	SB
8	2	Martina Weil	Chile	53.03	

=== 800 meters ===
Heats – May 20

Rank	Heat	Name	Nationality	Time	Notes
1	2	Jaqueline Weber	Brazil	2:05.42	Q
2	2	Patrícia Silva	Portugal	2:05.56	Q, PB
3	2	Déborah Rodríguez	Uruguay	2:05.69	Q
4	1	Marina Martínez	Spain	2:05.92	Q
5	2	Andrea Calderón	Ecuador	2:06.31	q
6	1	Martina Escudero	Argentina	2:06.64	Q
7	2	Anita Poma	Peru	2:06.72	q, NR
8	1	Priscilla Morales	Puerto Rico	2:06.75	Q
9	1	Flávia de Lima	Brazil	2:07.11	SB
10	1	Berdine Castillo	Chile	2:07.18	
11	2	Daniela García	Spain	2:14.61	qR
12	1	Mariana Pérez	Dominican Republic	2:14.93	SB
13	2	Cristina Martins	Andorra	2:22.49	
	1	Daily Cooper	Cuba	DQ	R17.3.1

Final – May 22

Rank	Name	Nationality	Time	Notes
1st place, gold medalist(s)	Déborah Rodríguez	Uruguay	2:02.53	
2nd place, silver medalist(s)	Daniela García	Spain	2:03.65	
3rd place, bronze medalist(s)	Patrícia Silva	Portugal	2:04.23	PB
4	Marina Martínez	Spain	2:04.44	
5	Andrea Calderón	Ecuador	2:05.55	
6	Jaqueline Weber	Brazil	2:05.76	
7	Martina Escudero	Argentina	2:08.78	
8	Priscilla Morales	Puerto Rico	2:36.94	
	Anita Poma	Peru	DQ	R17.3.1

=== 1500 meters ===
May 21

Rank	Name	Nationality	Time	Notes
1st place, gold medalist(s)	Solange Pereira	Spain	4:15.87	
2nd place, silver medalist(s)	Agueda Marqués	Spain	4:16.42	
3rd place, bronze medalist(s)	Salomé Afonso	Portugal	4:17.35	
4	Muriel Coneo	Colombia	4:17.37	SB
5	María Pía Fernández	Uruguay	4:17.84	
6	Fedra Luna	Argentina	4:18.80	
7	Alondra Negrón	Puerto Rico	4:21.80	
8	Rejane da Silva	Brazil	4:25.19	
9	Josefa Quezada	Chile	4:26.93	
10	Laura Acuña	Chile	4:33.90	
11	Aina Cinca	Andorra	4:51.60	
	Andrea Calderón	Ecuador	DNF	
	Mariana Borelli	Argentina	DNF	
	Tatiane Raquel da Silva	Brazil	DNS	

=== 5000 meters ===
May 22

Rank	Name	Nationality	Time	Notes
1st place, gold medalist(s)	Joselyn Brea	Venezuela	16:08.83	
2nd place, silver medalist(s)	Fedra Luna	Argentina	16:09.96	
3rd place, bronze medalist(s)	Lucía Rodríguez	Spain	16:10.08	SB
4	Carla Domínguez	Spain	16:10.62	
5	Muriel Coneo	Colombia	16:12.69	
6	Simone Ferraz	Brazil	16:14.63	SB
7	Micaela Levaggi	Argentina	16:17.60	
8	Palmenia Agudelo	Colombia	16:17.82	
9	Franciane Moura	Brazil	16:47.64	PB
10	Silvia Ortiz	Ecuador	17:06.19	
	Josefa Quezada	Chile	DNF	

=== Half marathon ===
May 22

Rank	Name	Nationality	Time	Notes
1st place, gold medalist(s)	Florencia Borelli	Argentina	1:11:59	CR
2nd place, silver medalist(s)	Daiana Ocampo	Argentina	1:13:13	
3rd place, bronze medalist(s)	Marta Galimany	Spain	1:13:23	
4	Beverly Ramos	Puerto Rico	1:14:18	
5	Jhoselyn Camargo	Bolivia	1:14:40	
6	Laura Méndez	Spain	1:14:51	
7	Katerine Tisalema	Ecuador	1:17:23	
8	Valdilene Silva	Brazil	1:17:38	
9	Andreia Hessel	Brazil	1:18:00	
10	Jennifer González	Chile	1:19:00	
	Soledad Torre	Peru	DNF	

=== 100 meters hurdles ===
May 22
Wind: +0.5 m/s

Rank	Lane	Name	Nationality	Time	Notes
1st place, gold medalist(s)	6	Greisys Robles	Cuba	12.93	PB
2nd place, silver medalist(s)	5	Keily Linet Pérez	Cuba	13.01	PB
3rd place, bronze medalist(s)	4	Paola Vázquez	Puerto Rico	13.05	
4	7	Ketiley Batista	Brazil	13.33	SB
5	8	Diana Bazalar	Peru	13.39	SB
6	2	Olímpia Barbosa	Portugal	13.49	SB
7	3	Vitoria Alves	Brazil	14.45	

=== 400 meters hurdles ===
Heats – May 20

Rank	Heat	Name	Nationality	Time	Notes
1	1	Grace Claxton	Puerto Rico	55.91	Q, SB
2	2	Sara Gallego	Spain	56.39	Q, SB
3	2	Zurian Hechavarría	Cuba	56.63	Q, SB
4	1	Melissa Gonzalez	Colombia	56.69	Q
5	1	Liliane Parrela	Brazil	57.46	Q
6	1	Carla García	Spain	57.61	q, SB
7	2	Chayenne da Silva	Brazil	57.62	Q
8	2	Evilin del Carmen	Dominican Republic	59.10	q
9	2	Juliana Guerreiro	Portugal	59.20	SB
10	2	Natali Brito	Mexico	1:02.42	SB
11	1	Duna Viñals	Andorra	1:03.19	NR
12	2	Bruna Luque	Andorra	1:05.91	
	1	Franshina Martínez	Dominican Republic	DNF	

Final – May 21

Rank	Lane	Name	Nationality	Time	Notes
1st place, gold medalist(s)	5	Melissa Gonzalez	Colombia	54.87	PB
2nd place, silver medalist(s)	4	Sara Gallego	Spain	55.56	SB
3rd place, bronze medalist(s)	3	Grace Claxton	Puerto Rico	55.66	PB
4	6	Zurian Hechavarría	Cuba	55.68	SB
5	7	Chayenne da Silva	Brazil	56.89	
6	2	Evilin del Carmen	Dominican Republic	57.74	PB
7	8	Liliane Parrela	Brazil	57.77	
8	1	Carla García	Spain	57.82	

=== 3000 meters steeplechase ===
May 21

Rank	Name	Nationality	Time	Notes
1st place, gold medalist(s)	Belén Casetta	Argentina	9:29.60	CR
2nd place, silver medalist(s)	Irene Sánchez-Escribano	Spain	9:37.08	SB
3rd place, bronze medalist(s)	Tatiane Raquel da Silva	Brazil	9:42.06	SB
4	Simone Ferraz	Brazil	9:45.11	PB
5	Carolina Lozano	Argentina	9:49.16	PB
6	Carolina Robles	Spain	9:54.13	SB
7	Joana Soares	Portugal	9:56.27	SB
8	Xenia Mourelo	Andorra	11:13.86	NR

=== 4 × 100 meters relay ===
May 21

Rank	Lane	Nation	Competitors	Time	Notes
1st place, gold medalist(s)	4	Dominican Republic	Martha Méndez, Marileidy Paulino, Anabel Medina, Fiordaliza Cofil	43.81	SB
2nd place, silver medalist(s)	5	Portugal	Patrícia Rodrigues, Rosalina Santos, Olímpia Barbosa, Lorène Bazolo	44.82	SB
	6	Brazil	Ketiley Batista, Ana Cláudia Lemos, Lorraine Martins, Rosângela Santos	DNF	
	3	Spain	María Isabel Pérez, Lucia Carrillo, Paula Sevilla, Carmen Marco	DQ	R24.7

=== 4 × 400 meters relay ===
May 22

Rank	Lane	Nation	Competitors	Time	Notes
1st place, gold medalist(s)	5	Spain	Berta Segura, Eva Santidrián, Carmen Avilés, Sara Gallego	3:31.72	SB
2nd place, silver medalist(s)	6	Brazil	Tábata de Carvalho, Liliane Fernandes, Chayenne da Silva, Tiffani Marinho	3:32.50	SB
3rd place, bronze medalist(s)	4	Dominican Republic	Mariana Pérez, Evilin del Carmen, Franshina Martínez, Fiordaliza Cofil	3:33.41	SB
4	3	Andorra	Duna Viñals, Bruna Luque, Aina Cinca, Cristina Martins	4:02.42	NR

=== 10,000 metres walk ===
May 21

Rank	Name	Nationality	Time	Penalties	Notes
1st place, gold medalist(s)	Laura García-Caro	Spain	43:33.72	~~	PB
2nd place, silver medalist(s)	Kimberly García	Peru	43:41.50		SB
3rd place, bronze medalist(s)	Ana Cabecinha	Portugal	44:23.69	~	SB
4	Evelyn Inga	Peru	45:01.87		PB
5	Karla Jaramillo	Ecuador	47:32.04	~~	
6	Gabriela Muniz	Brazil	48:43.33	>>	SB
7	Rachelle de Orbeta	Puerto Rico	48:58.51		
	Viviane Lyra	Brazil	DNF	~~~P	

=== High jump ===
May 22

Rank	Name	Nationality	1.60	1.65	1.70	1.75	1.78	1.81	1.84	1.87	1.90	1.95	Result	Notes
	Kateryna Tabashnyk*	Ukraine	–	–	–	o	–	o	o	o	xxo	xxx	1.90	SB
1st place, gold medalist(s)	Marysabel Senyu	Dominican Republic	–	–	o	o	o	xo	xxo	o	xxx		1.87	PB
2nd place, silver medalist(s)	Valdileia Martins	Brazil	–	–	–	–	o	o	o	xxx			1.84	SB
3rd place, bronze medalist(s)	Jennifer Rodríguez	Colombia	–	–	o	o	xxo	xxo	o	xxx			1.84	
4	Saleta Fernández	Spain	–	–	o	o	o	o	xxx				1.81	SB
5	Sarah Freitas	Brazil	–	o	o	o	xo	xxx					1.78	
6	Anabela Neto	Portugal	–	o	xo	o	xxx						1.75	SB
7	Joyce Micolta	Ecuador	–	xo	o	xo	xxx						1.75	
8	Antonia Merino	Chile	–	o	xo	xxo	xxx						1.75	PB
9	Catherine Nina	Dominican Republic	xo	o	xo	xxx							1.70	SB
10	Lorena Aires	Uruguay	o	o	xxo	xxx							1.70	SB
11	Carla Lorena Ríos	Bolivia	o	xo	xxo	xxx							1.70	

=== Pole vault ===
May 20

Rank	Name	Nationality	4.00	4.10	4.15	4.20	4.25	4.30	4.35	4.40	Result	Notes
1st place, gold medalist(s)	Monica Clemente	Spain	o	–	o	o	o	xo	–	xxx	4.30	
2nd place, silver medalist(s)	Juliana Campos	Brazil	xxo	o	–	o	–	xo	–	xxx	4.30	SB
3rd place, bronze medalist(s)	Malen Ruiz de Azua	Spain	xo	xo	–	o	xxo	xx–	x		4.25	
4	Isabel de Quadros	Brazil	o	xo	–	xxx					4.10	
5	Diamara Planell	Puerto Rico	xxo	xo	–	xxx					4.10	SB
6	Viviana Quintana	Puerto Rico	o	xxx							4.00	

=== Long jump ===
May 20

Rank	Name	Nationality	#1	#2	#3	#4	#5	#6	Result	Notes
1st place, gold medalist(s)	Fátima Diame	Spain	6.65	x	x	x	x	x	6.65	SB
2nd place, silver medalist(s)	Evelise Veiga	Portugal	6.55w	6.21	6.36	x	x	6.53	6.55w	
3rd place, bronze medalist(s)	Yuliana Angulo	Ecuador	6.48	6.41w	6.31	x	6.10	–	6.48	
4	Irati Mitxelena	Spain	6.16	6.42	x	x	6.12	6.24	6.42	PB
5	Nathale Aranda	Panama	6.29	6.30	6.38	6.29	x	x	6.38	
6	Eliane Martins	Brazil	x	x	5.80	x	6.08	6.30	6.30	
7	Rocío Muñoz	Chile	6.06	x	5.63	x	x	x	6.06	
	Lissandra Campos	Brazil	x	x	x				NM	
	Adriana Rodríguez	Cuba	x	x	x				NM	

=== Triple jump ===
May 22

Rank	Name	Nationality	#1	#2	#3	#4	#5	#6	Result	Notes
1st place, gold medalist(s)	Leyanis Pérez	Cuba	14.58	14.17	14.21	14.26	12.95	x	14.58	PB
2nd place, silver medalist(s)	Liadagmis Povea	Cuba	14.36	14.20	14.37	14.35	14.41	x	14.41	
3rd place, bronze medalist(s)	Ana José Tima	Dominican Republic	13.91	14.25	14.08	14.06	13.92	12.02	14.25	SB
4	Patricia Sarrapio	Spain	13.33	13.71	13.12	x	x	x	13.71	SB
5	Evelise Veiga	Portugal	13.38	x	13.12	13.50	x	x	13.50	
6	Gabriele dos Santos	Brazil	13.01	13.38	–	13.35	–	x	13.38	
7	Liuba Zaldívar	Ecuador	13.26	x	13.37	–	13.12	13.35	13.37	
8	Valeria Quispe	Bolivia	12.82	x	x	x	12.77	–	12.82	
9	Silvana Segura	Peru	12.09	x	x				12.09	
	Núbia Soares	Brazil	x	x	–				NM	

=== Shot put ===
May 21

Rank	Name	Nationality	#1	#2	#3	#4	#5	#6	Result	Notes
1st place, gold medalist(s)	Jessica Inchude	Portugal	17.64	17.53	17.90	18.07	17.75	17.80	18.07	
2nd place, silver medalist(s)	María Belén Toimil	Spain	16.17	16.49	17.85	x	17.66	x	17.85	SB
3rd place, bronze medalist(s)	Rosa Ramírez	Dominican Republic	16.02	16.32	17.60	16.96	16.63	16.77	17.60	PB
4	Ivana Gallardo	Chile	15.95	x	16.85	17.43	16.69	x	17.43	SB
5	Eliana Bandeira	Portugal	15.79	x	15.81	16.44	16.23	16.95	16.95	
6	Lívia Avancini	Brazil	16.71	16.70	x	x	x	16.71	16.71	
7	Milena Sens	Brazil	14.43	15.20	15.74	15.81	15.39	15.78	15.81	

=== Discus throw ===
May 22

Rank	Name	Nationality	#1	#2	#3	#4	#5	#6	Result	Notes
1st place, gold medalist(s)	Yaime Pérez	Cuba	x	57.82	62.06	60.08	x	x	62.06	
2nd place, silver medalist(s)	Karen Gallardo	Chile	x	56.57	58.17	57.71	59.39	54.45	59.39	
3rd place, bronze medalist(s)	Andressa de Morais	Brazil	x	58.33	55.71	54.81	58.17	x	58.33	
4	Silinda Morales	Cuba	54.51	51.24	57.55	57.32	x	57.97	57.97	
5	Fernanda Martins	Brazil	x	57.05	x	x	x	x	57.05	
6	Irina Rodrigues	Portugal	x	54.66	56.14	56.73	55.83	x	56.73	
7	Catalina Bravo	Chile	48.65	47.21	x	47.48	48.73	x	48.73	

=== Hammer throw ===
May 21

Rank	Name	Nationality	#1	#2	#3	#4	#5	#6	Result	Notes
1st place, gold medalist(s)	Laura Redondo	Spain	67.30	68.68	67.64	x	68.23	68.01	68.68	
2nd place, silver medalist(s)	Mariana Marcelino	Brazil	12.15	64.51	55.53	60.65	63.22	63.92	64.51	
3rd place, bronze medalist(s)	Mayra Gaviria	Colombia	63.84	62.46	64.44	63.01	63.77	x	64.44	
4	Ximena Zorrilla	Peru	x	63.15	59.52	60.90	x	63.46	63.46	
5	Osarumen Odeh	Spain	61.33	x	62.71	61.28	x	61.57	62.71	
6	Anna Paula Pereira	Brazil	58.90	59.01	59.24	x	59.64	x	59.64	
7	Gabrielle Figueroa	Honduras	54.24	x	x	52.08	x	56.82	56.82	

=== Javelin throw ===
May 20

Rank	Name	Nationality	#1	#2	#3	#4	#5	#6	Result	Notes
1st place, gold medalist(s)	Juleisy Angulo	Ecuador	60.91	55.71	58.03	x	x	50.24	60.91	NR
2nd place, silver medalist(s)	Flor Ruiz	Colombia	58.16	56.20	x	57.57	56.24	60.52	60.52	SB
3rd place, bronze medalist(s)	Jucilene de Lima	Brazil	50.86	54.60	55.02	x	55.02	57.86	57.86	
4	Yiselena Ballar	Cuba	x	56.14	51.59	56.12	52.58	52.67	56.14	
5	Manuela Rotundo	Uruguay	55.81	52.61	52.17	52.40	51.48	47.28	55.81	NR
6	Coraly Ortiz	Puerto Rico	x	52.41	44.56	51.16	52.96	55.19	55.19	
7	Arantza Moreno	Spain	49.84	52.69	x	52.18	54.13	x	54.13	
8	Yiset Jiménez	Colombia	49.41	x	52.98	x	x	52.72	52.98	
9	Cláudia Ferreira	Portugal	49.69	x	51.66				51.66	
10	Rafaela Torres	Brazil	x	45.30	44.69				45.30	

=== Heptathlon ===
May 20–21

The highest mark recorded in each event is highlighted in yellow

Rank	Athlete	Nationality	100m H	HJ	SP	200m	LJ	JT	800m	Points	Notes
1st place, gold medalist(s)	Martha Araújo	Colombia	13.76	1.62	13.24	25.31	6.14	52.47	2:23.57	5951	PB
2nd place, silver medalist(s)	Ana Camila Pirelli	Paraguay	13.66	1.68	13.44	24.85	5.28	46.98	2:17.76	5808	SB
3rd place, bronze medalist(s)	Alysbeth Félix	Puerto Rico	13.80	1.74	10.86	24.58	5.65	40.77	2:20.37	5666	
4	Mariana Bento	Portugal	14.13	1.65	11.39	25.36	5.67	39.51	2:23.21	5418	
5	Joyce Micolta	Ecuador	14.66	1.80	11.40	27.00	5.49	38.54	2:27.17	5263	
	Raiane Vasconcelos	Brazil	17.63	DNS	–	–	–	–	–	DNF	
