= Maeva Danois =

French steeplechase runner

Personal information
- Born: 10 March 1993 (age 32) Caen, France
- Height: 1.65 m (5 ft 5 in)
- Weight: 53 kg (117 lb)

Sport
- Sport: Athletics
- Event: 3000 m steeplechase
- Club: EA Mondeville Hérouville
- Coached by: Bruno Gajer; Adrien Taouji

Maeva Danois (born 10 March 1993 in Caen) is a French runner competing primarily in the 3000 metres steeplechase. She represented her country at the 2017 World Championships without advancing from the first round. Additionally, she won a silver medal at the 2015 European U23 Championships.

== International competitions ==
Year	Competition	Venue	Position	Event	Notes
Representing France
2015	European U23 Championships	Tallinn, Estonia	2nd	3000 m s'chase	9:40.89
2016	European Championships	Amsterdam, Netherlands	21st (h)	3000 m s'chase	9:58.73
2017	World Championships	London, United Kingdom	24th (h)	3000 m s'chase	9:49.21

== Personal bests ==
Outdoor

- 1500 metres – 4:18.87 (Ninove 2016)
- 3000 metres – 9:15.99 (Herouville 2015)
- 10 kilometres – 35:56 (Paris 2016)
- 3000 metres steeplechase – 9:40.19 (Oordegem 2016)

Indoor

- 3000 metres – 9:20.79 (Mondeville 2016)
