= Alicja Konieczek =

Polish steeplechase runner

Personal information
- Nationality: Polish
- Born: 2 November 1994 (age 32) Zbąszyń, Poland
- Education: Western State Colorado University
- Height: 1.69 m (5 ft 7 in)
- Weight: 55 kg (121 lb)

Sport
- Country: Poland
- Sport: Athletics
- Event: 3000 metres steeplechase
- University team: Western State Mountaineers
- Club: Oś AZS Poznań (Poland) (Albuquerque, New Mexico)
- Coached by: Ben Fletcher
Medal record
Women's athletics
Representing Poland
European Team Championships
Gold medal – first place	2021 Chorzów	3000 m steeplechase

Alicja Konieczek (born 2 November 1994) is a Polish Olympic runner specializing in the 3000 meters steeplechase. In 2020 she joined On Athletics Club sponsored by Swiss company On. She won the gold medal at the 2019 Summer Universiade and the Super League European Team Championships in Chorzów. Tokyo 2020 was her first Olympics, where she ran the second fastest time of her career (9:31.79) and took 20th place. In 2019, she ran 9:44.96 at the IAAF World Championships in Qatar placing 28th.

Her younger sister Aneta graduated from University of Oregon in 2022. She has multiply medals from the Polish Championships and a few Polish records in different age categories. Their older brother Dawid was also a runner that graduated from Western Colorado University in 2017 who has won several medals at the age National Championships and represented Poland internationally.

In 2020, Alicja Konieczek served as a volunteer coach with the University of New Mexico cross country & track and field teams and now remotely coaches distance runners.

In January 2022, Alicja left the prestigious training group, On Athletics Club, in Boulder, Colorado that is coached by Dathan Ritzenhein. She is based in Albuquerque, NM, where she is training for the 2024 Olympics.

At the 2024 Summer Olympics, she set a new national record of 9:16.51 in the 3000 metres steeplechase and improved the record previously held by Wioletta Frankiewicz.

== Education ==
In 2014, Alicja started at the Western Colorado University where she graduated in 2019 with a summa cum laude honors in Exercise Sport Science.

== International competitions ==
Year	Competition	Venue	Position	Event	Notes
Representing Poland
2011	World Youth Championships	Lille, France	21st (h)	2000 m s'chase	6:55.31
2013	European Junior Championships	Rieti, Italy	21st (h)	3000 m s'chase	10:59.80
2018	European Championships	Berlin, Germany	17th (h)	3000 m s'chase	9:41.16
2019	Universiade	Naples, Italy	1st	3000 m s'chase	9:41.46
2019	World Championships	Doha, Qatar	28th (h)	3000 m s'chase	9:44.96
2021	European Team Championships Super League	Chorzów, Poland	1st	3000 m s'chase	9:35.63
2021	Olympic Games	Tokyo, Japan	20th (h)	3000 m s'chase	9:31.79
2022	European Championships	Munich, Germany	4th	3000 m s'chase	9:25.15
2023	World Championships	Budapest, Hungary	14th (h)	3000 m s'chase	9:23.45
2024	European Championships	Rome, Italy	7th	3000 m s'chase	9:23.28
2024	Olympic Games	Paris, France	13th	3000 m s'chase	9:21.31
2025	European Running Championships	Leuven, Belgium	40th	10 km	33:16
2026	European Championships	Birmingham, United Kingdom	14th	3000 m s'chase	9:46.79

== Personal bests ==
Outdoor

- 800 metres – 2:15.16 (Biała Podlaska 2014)
- 1500 metres – 4:10.79 (Warsaw 2024)
- 3000 metres – 10:10.51 (Słubice 2014)
- 5000 metres – 15:30.61 (Azusa 2023)
- 3000 metres steeplechase – 9:21.89 (Zurich 2023)
- 2000 metres steeplechase – 6:04.29 (Poznań 2024)

Indoor

- 800 metres – 2:11.70 (Albuquerque 2020)
- 1500 metres – 4:11.43 (Boston 2024)
- mile – 4:29.13 (Boston 2024)
- 3000 metres – 8:51.08 (Boston 2023)
- 2 miles – 9:35.43 (New York City 2024)
- 5000 metres – 15:34.74 (Boston 2023)
