= Simone Ferraz =

Brazilian hurdler (born 1990)

Personal information
- Full name: Simone Ponte Ferraz
- Born: 12 March 1990 (age 36) Ponte Serrada, Brazil

Sport
- Sport: Athletics
- Event: 3000 metres steeplechase

Simone Ponte Ferraz (born 12 March 1990) is a Brazilian athlete specialising in the 3000 metres steeplechase. She has won two medals at the South American Championships. She competed at the 2020 Summer Olympics.

Her personal best in the event is 9:45.11 seconds set in La Nucia in 2021.

== International competitions ==
Year	Competition	Venue	Position	Event	Notes
Representing Brazil
2019	South American Championships	Lima, Peru	7th	5000 m	16:37.06
2019	South American Championships	Lima, Peru	3rd	3000 m s'chase	10:05.88
2019	Pan American Games	Lima, Peru	8th	3000 m s'chase	10:11.04
2021	South American Championships	Guayaquil, Ecuador	8th	5000 m	16:41.63
2021	South American Championships	Guayaquil, Ecuador	2nd	3000 m s'chase	9:45.15 PB
2021	Olympic Games	Tokyo, Japan	38th (h)	3000 m s'chase	10:00.92
2022	Ibero-American Championships	La Nucía, Spain	6th	5000 m	16:14.63
2022	Ibero-American Championships	La Nucía, Spain	4th	3000 m s'chase	9:45.11
2022	World Championships	Eugene, United States	38th (h)	3000 m s'chase	9:53.52
2023	South American Championships	São Paulo, Brazil	4th	5000 m	16:31.53
2023	South American Championships	São Paulo, Brazil	2nd	3000 m s'chase	9:59.44
2023	Pan American Games	Santiago, Chile	6th	3000 m s'chase	10:00.62
2024	Ibero-American Championships	Cuiabá, Brazil	8th	5000 m	17:48.23
2024	Ibero-American Championships	Cuiabá, Brazil	2nd	3000 m s'chase	9:52.93
2026	Ibero-American Championships	Lima, Peru	4th	3000 m s'chase	10:26.70
2026	World Road Running Championships	Copenhagen, Denmark	40th	5 km	17:21

== Personal bests ==
Outdoor

- 800 metres – 2:16.42 minutes (Itajaí 2013)
- 1500 metres – 4:27.19 minutes (Jaraguá 2018)
- 3000 metres steeplechase – 9:45.11 minutes (La Nucia 2022)
- 5000 metres – 16:02.34 minutes (Rio de Janeiro 2022)
- 10,000 metres – 35:20.95 minutes (Jaraguá 2019)
- 10 kilometres – 34:51 minutes (Santos 2021)
- Half marathon – 1:15:21 hours (Rio de Janeiro 2021)
- Marathon – 2:38:10 hours (Buenos Aires 2019)
