= Anna Emilie Møller =

Danish athlete

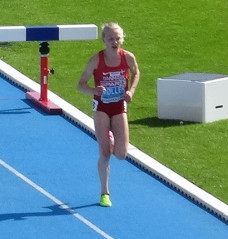
- Anna Emilie Møller in 2017

Personal information
- Born: July 28, 1997 (age 29) Copenhagen, Denmark
- Height: 1.66 m (5 ft 5 in)
- Weight: 52 kg (115 lb)

Sport
- Sport: Athletics
- Event: 3000 m steeplechase
- Club: Blovstrød Løverne
- Coached by: Kersti Jakobsen

Anna Emilie Møller (born 28 July 1997) is a Danish athlete competing in the 3000 metres steeplechase. She represented her country at the 2016 Summer Olympics without qualifying for the final. In her heat, however, she set the new national and European junior record in the event.

In 2016, she finished in 5th place in the final of the women's 3000 metres steeplechase event at the 2016 IAAF World U20 Championships held in Bydgoszcz, Poland.

In 2019, she competed in the senior women's race at the 2019 IAAF World Cross Country Championships held in Aarhus, Denmark. She finished in 15th place.

== International competitions ==
Year	Competition	Venue	Position	Event	Notes
Representing Denmark
2015	European Junior Championships	Eskilstuna, Sweden	3rd	3000 m	9:17.36
2015	European Junior Championships	Eskilstuna, Sweden	2nd	5000 m	16:07.43
2016	World U20 Championships	Bydgoszcz, Poland	5th	3000 m s'chase	9:43.84
2016	Olympic Games	Rio de Janeiro, Brazil	21st (h)	3000 m s'chase	9:32.68
2017	European U23 Championships	Bydgoszcz, Poland	1st	3000 m s'chase	9:43.05
2017	World Championships	London, United Kingdom	21st (h)	3000 m s'chase	9:44.12
2018	European Championships	Berlin, Germany	7th	3000 m s'chase	9:31.66
2019	European U23 Championships	Gävle, Sweden	1st	5000 m	15:07.70
2019	European U23 Championships	Gävle, Sweden	1st	3000 m s'chase	9:27.31
2019	World Championships	Doha, Qatar	16th (h)	5000 m	15:11.76
2019	World Championships	Doha, Qatar	7th	3000 m s'chase	9:13.46
2021	Olympic Games	Tokyo, Japan	21st (h)	3000 m s'chase	9:31.99
2025	European Running Championships	Leuven, Belgium	62nd	10 km	34:12
2026	World Road Running Championships	Copenhagen, Denmark	33rd	5 km	16:19

== Personal bests ==
Outdoor

- 800 metres – 2:05.91 (Aarhus 2016)
- 1500 metres – 4:09.12 (Watford 2019)
- 3000 metres – 8:47.83 (Zagreb 2016)
- 5000 metres – 15:07.70 (Gävle 2019)
- 10,000 metres – 34:29.41 (Aarhus 2015)
- 3000 metres steeplechase – 9:13.46 (Doha 2019)
