= Athletics at the 2015 Pan American Games – Women's 3000 metres steeplechase =

Women's 3000 metres steeplechase at the 2015 Pan American Games
- Venue: CIBC Pan Am and Parapan Am Athletics Stadium
- Dates: July 24
- Competitors: 11 from 7 nations
- Winning time: 9:48.12

Medalists
Gold medal	Ashley Higginson	United States
Silver medal	Shalaya Kipp	United States
Bronze medal	Geneviève Lalonde	Canada

The Women's 3000 metres steeplechase sprint competition of the athletics events at the 2015 Pan American Games took place on July 24 at the CIBC Pan Am and Parapan Am Athletics Stadium. The defending Pan American Games champion is Sara Hall of the United States.

== Records ==
Prior to this competition, the existing world and Pan American Games records were as follows:

World record	Gulnara Samitova-Galkina (RUS)	8:58.81	Beijing, China	August 17, 2008
Pan American Games record	Sabine Heitling (BRA)	9:51.13	Rio de Janeiro, Brazil	July 28, 2007

== Qualification ==
Each National Olympic Committee (NOC) was able to enter up to two entrants providing they had met the minimum standard (10.46.00) in the qualifying period (January 1, 2014 to June 28, 2015).

== Schedule ==
Date	Time	Round
July 24, 2015		Final

== Results ==
All times shown are in seconds.

KEY:	q	Fastest non-qualifiers	Q	Qualified	NR	National record	PB	Personal best	SB	Seasonal best	DQ	Disqualified

=== Final ===
Rank	Name	Nationality	Time	Notes
1st place, gold medalist(s)	Ashley Higginson	United States	9:48.12	PR
2nd place, silver medalist(s)	Shalaya Kipp	United States	9:49.96	
3rd place, bronze medalist(s)	Geneviève Lalonde	Canada	9:53.03	
4	Erin Teschuk	Canada	10:02.33	
5	Ana Cristina Narváez	Mexico	10:04.86	
6	Tatiane da Silva	Brazil	10:10.73	
7	Belén Casetta	Argentina	10:24.54	
8	Cinthya Paucar	Peru	10:35.16	
9	Andrea Ferris	Panama	10:40.10	
	Rolanda Bell	Panama	DNF	
	Juliana Paula dos Santos	Brazil	DNF	
