= Rina Cjuro =

Peruvian long-distance runner

Personal information
- Full name: Rina Ruth Cjuro Merma
- Born: 23 February 1998 (age 28)

Sport
- Country: Peru
- Sport: Long-distance running
Medal record
Women's athletics
Representing Peru
South American Games
Gold medal – first place	2018 Cochabamba	3000 m s'chase

Rina Ruth Cjuro Merma (born 23 February 1998) is a Peruvian long-distance runner. She competed in the senior women's race at the 2019 IAAF World Cross Country Championships held in Aarhus, Denmark. She finished in 82nd place.

In 2016, she competed in the women's 3000 metres steeplechase event at the IAAF World U20 Championships held in Bydgoszcz, Poland. In 2017, she competed in the junior women's race at the IAAF World Cross Country Championships held in Kampala, Uganda. She finished in 42nd place.

She competed in the women's 3000 metres steeplechase event at the 2019 Pan American Games held in Lima, Peru. She finished in 7th place with a personal best of 10:08.12.
