= Geneviève Lalonde =

Canadian runner (born 1991)

Personal information
- Born: September 5, 1991 (age 34) Montreal, Quebec, Canada
- Home town: Moncton, New Brunswick
- Height: 5 ft 7 in (170 cm)
- Weight: 127 lb (58 kg)

Sport
- Sport: Running
- Event: Steeplechase
- University team: University of Guelph
- Coached by: Joël Bourgeois & Hilary Stellingwerff

Achievements and titles
- Personal bests: 1500m: 4:08.54; Mile:4:29.99; 3000m steeplechase: 9:22.40; Indoor 3000m: 8:49.78i 5000m:15:48.60
Medal record
Women's athletics
Representing Canada
Pan American Games
Gold medal – first place	2019 Lima	3000 m s'chase
Bronze medal – third place	2015 Toronto	3000 m s'chase
Representing New Brunswick
Jeux de la Francophonie
Bronze medal – third place	2013 Nice	3000 m s'chase
Canada Games
Gold medal – first place	2013 Sherbrooke	2000 m s'chase

Geneviève Lalonde (born September 5, 1991) is a Canadian middle- and long-distance runner competing primarily in the 3000 metres steeplechase. Her biggest success to date is winning the gold medal at the 2019 Pan American Games. Lalonde won the bronze medal as a competitor for New Brunswick at the 2013 Jeux de la Francophonie in Nice, France. She also won the gold medal for New Brunswick at the 2013 Canada Summer Games in Sherbrooke, Quebec in the 2,000 m steeplechase.

In July 2016, she was officially named to Canada's Olympic team. On August 13, 2016, she qualified for the women's 3000m steeplechase final with a personal best and new Canadian record of 9:30.24.

On August 11, 2017, she finished 13th in the Women's 3000 meters steeplechase finals at the 2017 World Championships in Athletics in London lowering the Canadian record once again to 9:29.99. On May 18, 2019, she placed 7th at the Shanghai Golden Grand Prix with a time of 9:29.82, again lowering the national record.

== Competition record ==
Year	Competition	Venue	Position	Event	Notes
Representing Canada and New Brunswick
2007	World Youth Championships	Ostrava, Czech Republic	10th	1500 m	4:30.90
2010	World Junior Championships	Moncton, Canada	14th (h)	1500 m	4:19.20
2010	World Junior Championships	Moncton, Canada	6th	3000 m s'chase	9:57.74
2011	Universiade	Shenzhen, China	11th	3000 m s'chase	10:09.43
2012	NACAC U23 Championships	Irapuato, Mexico	4th	3000 m s'chase	10:56.38
2013	Jeux de la Francophonie	Nice, France	3rd	3000 m s'chase	9:53.35
2015	Pan American Games	Toronto, Ontario, Canada	3rd	3000 m s'chase	9:53.03
2015	World Championships	Beijing, China	19th (h)	3000 m s'chase	9:36.83
2016	Olympic Games	Rio de Janeiro, Brazil	16th	3000 m s'chase	9:41.88
2017	World Championships	London, United Kingdom	13th	3000 m s'chase	9:29.99
2018	World Indoor Championships	Birmingham, United Kingdom	11th	3000 m	9:03.91
2018	Commonwealth Games	Gold Coast, Australia	7th	3000 m s'chase	9:46.68
2019	Pan American Games	Lima, Peru	1st	3000 m s'chase	9:41.45
2019	World Championships	Doha, Qatar	14th	3000 m s'chase	9:32.92
2021	Olympic Games	Tokyo, Japan	11th	3000 m s'chase	9:22.40

== Personal bests ==
=== Outdoor ===
Event	Time	Venue	Date
800 metres	2:09.71	Guelph	8 July 2014
1500 metres	4:08.54	Guelph	7 June 2019
One mile	4:29.99	Mission Viejo	18 July 2021
2000 metres steeplechase	6:32.45	Sherbrooke	13 August 2013
3000 metres steeplechase	9:22.40	Tokyo	4 August 2021
5000 metres	15:48.60	Burnaby	29 May 2021

=== Indoor ===
Event	Time	Venue	Date
1500 metres	4:18.80	Montreal	27 January 2018
One mile	4:38.94	New York City	20 January 2017
3000 metres	8:49.78	Boston	10 February 2018

== See also ==
- List of Canadian sports personalities
