= Belén Casetta =

Argentine steeplechase runner

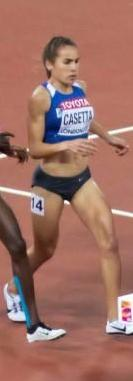
- Casetta at the 2017 World Championships

Personal information
- Full name: Belén Adaluz Casetta
- Born: 26 September 1994 (age 32) Mar del Plata, Argentina
- Education: FASTA University
- Height: 1.63 m (5 ft 4 in)
- Weight: 50 kg (110 lb)

Sport
- Sport: Athletics
- Event: 3000 m steeplechase
Medal record
Representing Argentina
Pan American Games
Gold medal – first place	2023 Santiago	3000 m s'chase
Bronze medal – third place	2019 Lima	3000 m s'chase
Summer Universiade
Silver medal – second place	2019 Naples	3000 m s'chase

Belén Adaluz Casetta (born 26 September 1994) is an Argentine runner specialising in the 3000 metres steeplechase.

With the personal best of 9:25.99 in the event, she is the current national record and the current South American record holder.

== Competition record ==
Year	Competition	Venue	Position	Event	Notes
Representing Argentina
2010	South American Youth Championships	Santiago, Chile	2nd	400 m hurdles	62.48
2010	Youth Olympic Games	Singapore	12th	400 m hurdles	64.58
2011	South American Championships	Buenos Aires, Argentina	6th	400 m hurdles	61.60
2011	South American Championships	Buenos Aires, Argentina	4th	4x400 m relay	3:52.52
2011	World Youth Championships	Lille, France	10th	2000 m s'chase	6:35.47
2012	World Junior Championships	Barcelona, Spain	14th (h)	3000 m s'chase	10:33.84
2013	South American Championships	Cartagena, Colombia	5th	1500 m	4:21.94
2013	South American Championships	Cartagena, Colombia	6th	3000 m s'chase	10:51.85
2015	South American Championships	Lima, Peru	3rd	3000 m s'chase	9:57.1
2015	Pan American Games	Toronto, Canada	7th	3000 m s'chase	10:24.54
2016	Ibero-American Championships	Rio de Janeiro, Brazil	1st	3000 m s'chase	9:42.93
2016	Olympic Games	Rio de Janeiro, Brazil	45th (h)	3000 m s'chase	9:51.85
2016	South American U23 Championships	Lima, Peru	1st	3000 m s'chase	10:05.30
2017	South American Championships	Asunción, Paraguay	2nd	5000 m	16:26.32
2017	South American Championships	Asunción, Paraguay	1st	3000 m s'chase	9:51.40
2017	World Championships	London, United Kingdom	11th	3000 m s'chase	9:25.99
2017	Universiade	Taipei, Taiwan	6th	3000 m s'chase	10:12.77
2018	Ibero-American Championships	Trujillo, Peru	3rd	3000 m s'chase	10:07.20
2019	South American Championships	Lima, Peru	2nd	3000 m s'chase	10:04.54
2019	Universiade	Naples, Italy	2nd	3000 m s'chase	9:43.05
2019	Pan American Games	Lima, Peru	3rd	3000 m s'chase	9:44.46
2019	World Championships	Doha, Qatar	29th (h)	3000 m s'chase	9:45.07
2021	South American Championships	Guayaquil, Ecuador	3rd	3000 m s'chase	9:45.79
2021	Olympic Games	Tokyo, Japan	36th (h)	3000 m s'chase	9:52.89
2022	Ibero-American Championships	La Nucía, Spain	1st	3000 m s'chase	9:29.60
2022	World Championships	Eugene, United States	27th (h)	3000 m s'chase	9:29.05
2022	South American Games	Asunción, Paraguay	1st	3000 m s'chase	10:23.28
2023	Pan American Games	Santiago, Chile	1st	3000 m s'chase	9:39.47
2024	Olympic Games	Paris, France	34th (h)	3000 m s'chase	9:34.78
2026	Ibero-American Championships	Lima, Peru	1st	3000 m s'chase	9:39.75
2026	South American Games	Santa Fe, Argentina	1st	3000 m s'chase	9:35.44

== Personal bests ==
Outdoor

- 1500 metres – 4:19.21 (Fresno State E.E.U.U 2017)
- 3000 metres – 8:55.96 (Memphis 2022)
- 3000 metres steeplechase – 9:25.99 (London 2017) NR
- 5000 metres – 16:23:61 (Mar del Plata 2016)
- 10km – 35:19 (Mar del Plata 2017)
