= Emma Oudiou =

French steeplechase runner

Personal information
- Born: 2 January 1995 (age 31) Paris, France
- Height: 172 cm (5 ft 8 in)
- Weight: 54 kg (119 lb)

Sport
- Country: France
- Sport: Track and field
- Event: 3000 metre steeplechase
- Club: Adidas Runners Paris
Medal record
Track and field
Representing France
European U23 Championships
| Bronze medal – third place | 2015 Tallinn | Women's 3000m steeplechase |
| Bronze medal – third place | 2017 Bydgoszcz | Women's 3000m steeplechase |

Emma Oudiou (born 2 January 1995) is a French athlete who competes in 3000 metre steeplechase events in international level events. She is a double bronze medalist in the European Athletics U23 Championships in this event.
