= Aneta Konieczek =

Polish athlete

Personal information
- Nationality: Polish
- Born: 8 June 1997 (age 29)

Sport
- Sport: Track and Field
- Event: 3000m steeplechase
- Club: WMLKS Nadodrze Powodowo
- Coached by: Ben Fletcher

Aneta Konieczek (born 8 June 1997) is a Polish Olympic steeplechaser.

== Career ==
In 2021, Konieczek won the gold medal at the Polish Seniors Athletics Championships in the 3000 m steeplechase race with a time of 9: 25.98, which ensured her participation in the 2020 Summer Olympics in Tokyo. That is also a 3rd result in a Polish history. She is a PAC-12 champion and a meet record holder. In 2021 she got All-American in an indoor mile. Her sister Alicja Konieczek took second place at the Polish Senior Championships and also achieved the Olympic standard time.

Konieczek ran the Athletics at the 2020 Summer Olympics – Women's 3000 metres steeplechase and finished twelfth in heat two in a time of 10.07:25.

She competed at the 2024 Summer Olympics in the Women's 3000 metres steeplechase.

== Personal life ==
She studied at Western Colorado University and at the University of Oregon. Her brother Dawid has competed in athletics at national level in Poland and university level in the US, and her sister Alicja is a fellow Olympic steeplechaser.
