= Ashley Higginson =

American steeplechase runner

- Higginson in 2012

Personal information
- Born: March 17, 1989 (age 37) Staten Island, New York
- Height: 5 ft 5 in (165 cm)

Sport
- Country: United States
- Event: 3000m Steeplechase
- College team: Princeton University
- Coached by: Frank Gagliano

Achievements and titles
- Personal best: 3000 m Steeplechase: 9:27.59 (2014) Mile: 4:26.1 (2016) 5000 Metres: 15:18.53 (2015)
Medal record
Women's athletics
Representing the United States
Pan American Games
Gold medal – first place	2015 Toronto	3000 m steeplechase
NACAC Championships
Gold medal – first place	2015 Costa Rica	3000 m steeplechase
USA Outdoor Championships
Silver medal – second place	2014	3000 m steeplechase
Silver medal – second place	2013	3000 m steeplechase

Ashley Higginson (born March 17, 1989) is an American middle-distance runner who has made the U.S. team for the 2013 World Championships in Athletics in the 3000 meter steeplechase.

== Life and career ==
Born in Staten Island, New York, Higginson grew up in Colts Neck Township, New Jersey, and graduated from Colts Neck High School as part of the class of 2007, where she was a NXN (aka Nike Cross Country National) champion and Foot Locker Cross Country Championships All-American. Higginson went on to graduate from Princeton University and Rutgers School of Law–Newark.

In 2008, Higginson competed in 2008 World Junior Championships in Athletics in the women's 5000 meters.

As an undergraduate, Higginson won seven Ivy League Outdoor Championships. This included the 5000 meter titles in 2008 and 2011, 3000 meter titles in 2010 and 2011, and three consecutive 3000 meter steeplechase titles in 2009 through 2011. In 2010, in her junior year at Princeton, she finished third in the NCAA Women's Division I Outdoor Track and Field Championships in the 3000 meter steeplechase.

Higginson placed fourth at the 2012 U.S. Olympic trials in the 3000 meter steeplechase.

Higginson qualified for the 2013 World Championships in Athletics in the 3000 meter steeplechase by placing second in that year's U.S. outdoor championship with a time of 9:46.25. At the 2013 World Championships, she finished in a time of 9:45.78 in the steeplechase event. The result was eleventh in her heat and nineteenth overall. She did not qualify for the final.

Higginson is the 2nd rated American steeplechaser in 2014 running 9:27.59 to earn the silver medal at the 2014 USA Outdoor Track and Field Championships in Sacramento, California, in June. She competed in the Diamond League in Stockholm Bauhaus Athletics on August 22, 2014, finished in 8th with a time of 9:33.89.

Higginson sets Pan Am games 3000 meter steeplechase record in July 2015. after placing 5th at 2015 USA Outdoor Track and Field Championships in Eugene, Oregon.

In 2016, Higginson opened her outdoor season running a 4:33.90 mile at Penn Relays and 4:08.13 in 1500 meters at Hoka One One Middle Distance Classic hosted at Occidental College. She placed 9th in 9:38.55 at 2016 US Olympic Trials (track and field) in steeplechase. Higginson placed 13th in 4:26.1 at 2016 Fifth Avenue Mile.

=== US Championships ===
Track and field

Year	Championship	Venue	Place	Competition	Time
2012	U.S. Olympic trials	Eugene, Oregon	4th	3000 meter steeplechase	9:38.06
2013	USA Outdoor Track and Field Championships	Des Moines, Iowa	2nd	3000 meter steeplechase	9:46.25
2014	USA Outdoor Track and Field Championships	Sacramento, California	2nd	3000 meter steeplechase	9:27.59
2015	USA Outdoor Track and Field Championships	Eugene, Oregon	5th	3000 meter steeplechase	9:35.55
2016	U.S. Olympic trials	Eugene, Oregon	9th	3000 meter steeplechase	9:38.55
