= Aimee Pratt =

British steeplechase runner

Personal information
- Nationality: British
- Born: 3 October 1997 (age 28) Stockport, England

Sport
- Country: United Kingdom
- Sport: Athletics
- Event: Steeplechase
- University team: Manchester University
- Club: Sale Harriers

Achievements and titles
- Personal bests: 3000m SC : 9:15.67 (2022); 3000m : 8:44.15 (2023)

Aimee Pratt (born 3 October 1997) is a British athlete. She competed in the women's 3000 metres steeplechase event at the 2019 World Athletics Championships.

In 2016, she competed in the women's 3000 metres steeplechase event at the 2016 IAAF World U20 Championships held in Bydgoszcz, Poland. She became the British champion when she won the 3000 metres steeplechase event at the 2020 British Athletics Championships in a time of 9 minutes 30.73 seconds. Pratt was selected to represent Great Britain at the 2024 Summer Olympics where she finished 11th in her heat and did not advance to the final.
