= Athletics at the 2015 African Games – Women's 3000 metres steeplechase =

The women's 3000 metres steeplechase event at the 2015 African Games was held on 15 September.

== Results ==
Rank	Name	Nationality	Time	Notes
1st place, gold medalist(s)	Sofia Assefa	Ethiopia	9:51.30	
2nd place, silver medalist(s)	Hiwot Ayalew	Ethiopia	9:51.94	
3rd place, bronze medalist(s)	Purity Cherotich Kirui	Kenya	9:52.54	
4	Magdalene Masai	Kenya	9:56.76	
5	Joan Chepkemoi	Kenya	10:04.54	
6	Etenesh Diro	Ethiopia	10:05.11	
7	Amina Bettiche	Algeria	10:29.22	
8	Luchia Segid	Eritrea	11:11.02	
9	Annah Bungu	Zimbabwe	11:59.79	
