= 2008 African Championships in Athletics – Women's 3000 metres steeplechase =

The women's 3000 metres steeplechase event at the 2008 African Championships in Athletics was held at the Addis Ababa Stadium on May 4.

== Results ==
Rank	Name	Nationality	Time	Notes
1st place, gold medalist(s)	Zemzem Ahmed	Ethiopia	9:44.58	CR
2nd place, silver medalist(s)	Mekdes Bekele	Ethiopia	9:59.52	
3rd place, bronze medalist(s)	Ruth Bosibori	Kenya	10:00.18	
4	Sofia Assefa	Ethiopia	10:05.73	
5	Mercy Wanjiku	Kenya	10:38.28	
6	Tebogo Masehla	South Africa	11:13.24	
	Lydia Rotich	Kenya	DNS	
