= Hyvin Jepkemoi =

Kenyan steeplechase runner (born 1992)

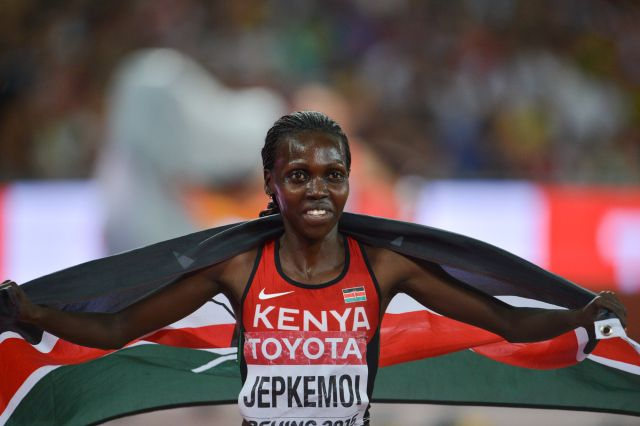
- Jepkemoi in 2015

Personal information
- Born: 13 January 1992 (age 34)
- Height: 1.62 m (5 ft 4 in)
- Weight: 42 kg (93 lb)

Sport
- Country: Kenya
- Sport: Athletics
- Event: 3000 metres steeplechase

Achievements and titles
- Personal best: 3000 m s'chase: 9:00.01 (Eugene 2016)
Medal record
Women's athletics
Representing Kenya
Olympic Games
Silver medal – second place	2016 Rio de Janeiro	3000 m s'chase
Bronze medal – third place	2020 Tokyo	3000 m s'chase
World Championships
Gold medal – first place	2015 Beijing	3000 m s'chase
Bronze medal – third place	2017 London	3000 m s'chase
All-Africa Games
Gold medal – first place	2011 Maputo	3000 m s’chase
African Championships
Bronze medal – third place	2012 Porto-Novo	3000 m s'chase

Hyvin Kiyeng Jepkemoi (born 13 January 1992) is a Kenyan steeplechase runner. She won gold at the 2015 World Championships in Athletics and 2011 All-Africa Games, and bronze at the 2017 World Championships and 2012 African Championships in Athletics. At the Olympic Games, she won silver in Rio de Janeiro and bronze in Tokyo. As of August 2021, her personal best time of 9:00.01 ranks her 6th on the world all-time list.

== Career ==
Early in her career, Jepkemoi competed in a variety of events; her main event was the 5,000 metres, in which she placed fifth at the 2011 Kenyan Championships. At the 2011 All-Africa Games in Maputo she competed in both the 5,000 metres and an event completely new to her, the 3,000 metres steeplechase; she placed fourth in her main event but won an unexpected gold in the steeplechase, running 10:00.50 and outkicking Ethiopia's Hiwot Ayalew to win Kenya's first athletics gold medal at the Games.

In 2012, Jepkemoi started concentrating on the steeplechase and her times improved; her best time that year was 9:23.53, which she ran at the Gugl Games in Linz. She scored her first IAAF Diamond Race points with a third place at Weltklasse Zürich after Sofia Assefa, the original winner, was disqualified for a lane violation. At the Kenyan Championships, Jepkemoi placed second and gained selection for the African Championships in Porto-Novo, where she won bronze despite falling at the water jump. At the Kenyan Olympic Trials, however, she only placed fifth and failed to qualify for the Olympic team. Track & Field News ranked Jepkemoi ninth in the world for 2012, her first top ten ranking.

In 2013, Jepkemoi only placed fourth at the Kenyan Championships but third at the World Championships Trials, qualifying for the Kenyan team to the 2013 World Championships in Athletics in Moscow. At the World Championships, she placed sixth with a new personal best time of 9:22.05; she ended the year ranked seventh in the world, up two places from the previous year. In 2014, Jepkemoi's best race was at the Ostrava Golden Spike meeting, where she ran 9:22.58 and narrowly won ahead of Morocco's Salima Alami.

Jepkemoi opened 2015 with a near-personal-best of 9:22.11 at the Doha Diamond League meeting, placing third behind Ethiopian runners Virginia Nyambura and Ayalew. In her next Diamond League meeting, the Golden Gala in Rome, she improved her personal best by almost seven seconds and won in a meeting record 9:15.08, defeating both Nyambura and Ayalew. Three days later she was runner-up to Nyambura at the British Grand Prix in Birmingham, her third consecutive Diamond Race points finish.

At the 2016 Summer Olympics, she secured the silver medal with a time of 9:07.12, where only Ruth Jebet ran faster than her. She won the bronze medal five years later in Tokyo finishing behind Peruth Chemutai and Courtney Frerichs.

== International competitions ==
Year	Competition	Venue	Position	Event	Notes
2011	All-Africa Games	Maputo, Mozambique	4th	5000 m	15:42.64
2011	All-Africa Games	Maputo, Mozambique	1st	3000 m s'chase	10:00.50
2012	African Championships	Porto-Novo, Benin	3rd	3000 m s'chase	9:45.95
2013	World Championships	Moscow, Russia	6th	3000 m s'chase	9:22.05
2015	World Championships	Beijing, China	1st	3000 m s'chase	9:19.11
2016	Olympic Games	Rio de Janeiro, Brazil	2nd	3000 m s'chase	9:07.12
2017	World Championships	London, United Kingdom	3rd	3000 m s'chase	9:04.03
2019	World Championships	Doha, Qatar	8th	3000 m s'chase	9:13.53
2021	Olympic Games	Tokyo, Japan	3rd	3000 m s'chase	9:05.39
