= Athletics at the 2012 Summer Olympics – Women's 3000 metres steeplechase =

Women's 3000 metres steeplechase at the Games of the XXX Olympiad
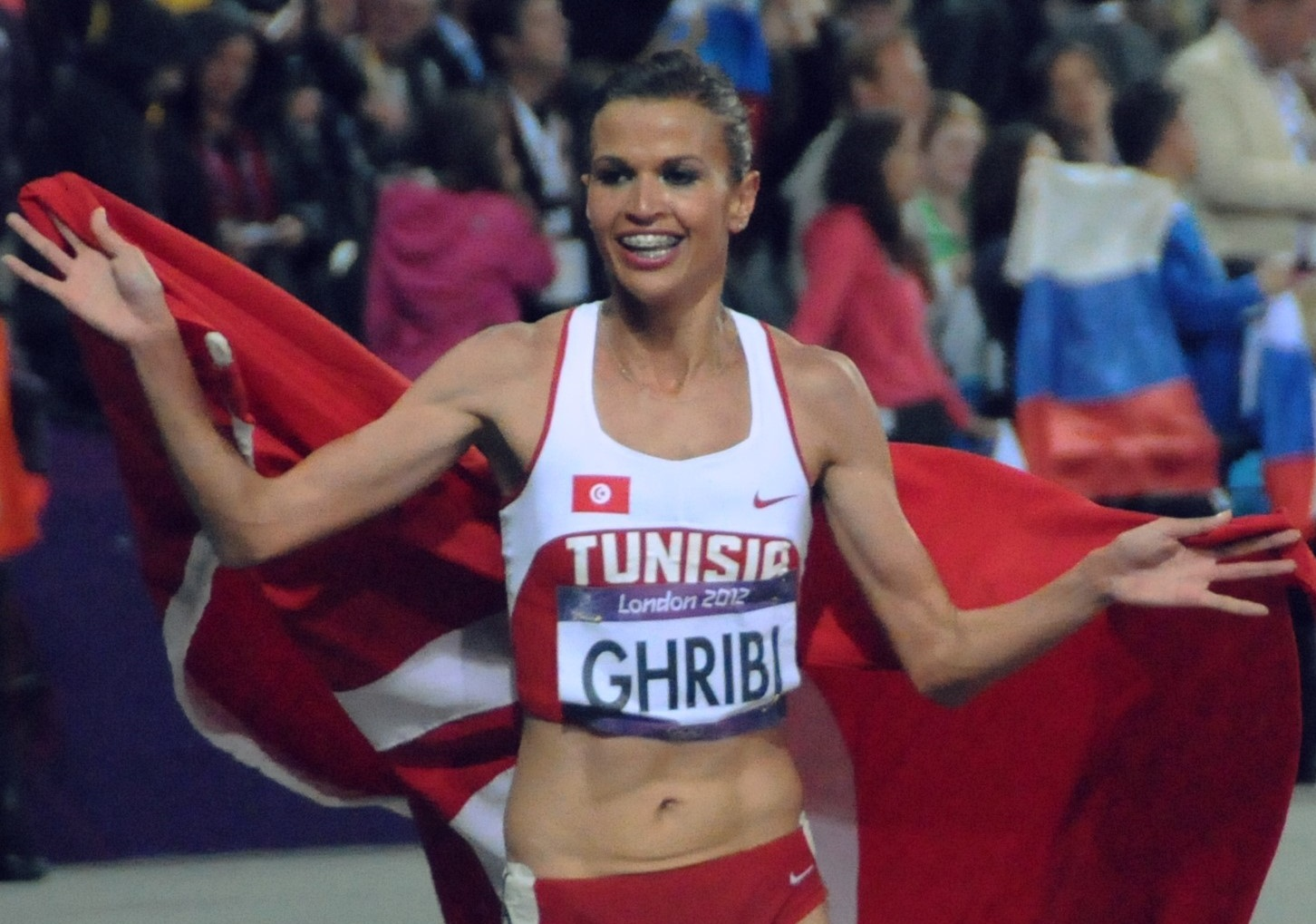
- Gold medal winner Habiba Ghribi
- Venue: Olympic Stadium
- Date: 4–6 August
- Competitors: 44 from 26 nations
- Winning time: 9:08.37

Medalists
| 1st place, gold medalist(s) | | Habiba Ghribi | Tunisia |
| 2nd place, silver medalist(s) | | Sofia Assefa | Ethiopia |
| 3rd place, bronze medalist(s) | | Milcah Chemos Cheywa | Kenya |

Official Video

The Women's 3000 metres steeplechase at the 2012 Summer Olympics took place on 4–6 August at the Olympic Stadium. The winning margin was 1.47 seconds.

From the gun in the final, reigning world champion Yuliya Zaripova sprinted out to the lead and dictated the pace. But rather than continuing to accelerate, she slowed, with the rest of the field bunching behind with nobody willing to go around. The pack slowly disintegrated by attrition. With 3 laps to go a group of seven had separated, including all three Ethiopians, plus Milcah Chemos Cheywa, Mercy Wanjiku Njoroge and Habiba Ghribi, all still behind Zaripova. On the 6th lap, defending champion and World Record holder Gulnara Galkina, already off the back, made a right turn and stepped off the track. The pace quickened, losing Etenesh Diro and Njoroge at the water jump. Zaripova just continued to accelerate. On the back stretch Ghribi looked to be clear of the other three but almost put her hand out so as not to pass Zaripova. From that point, Zaripova just extended her lead with Ghribi clearly in second place. Sofia Assefa broke away from her teammate Hiwot Ayalew. Down the home stretch Cheywa made a late run but Assefa held on for the bronze medal. Compared to the previous year's world championships, the first two medalists were the same, Zaripova a second faster for her personal record, Ghribi was 3 seconds faster for her Tunisian national record, and Assefa 19 seconds faster to push Cheywa off the podium.

On 24 March 2016 the Court of Arbitration for Sport disqualified Yuliya Zaripova's results from 20 July 2011 to 25 July 2013 for doping, which included the Olympics. On 4 June 2016, Tunisian Habiba Ghribi was awarded with the olympic gold medal in a ceremony in Rades, Tunisia, presented by IOC Vice-President Nawal El Moutawakel.

== Competition format ==
The women's 3000 m steeplechase competition consisted of heats and a final.

== Records ==
Prior to the competition, the existing World and Olympic records were as follows.

| World record | Gulnara Galkina (RUS) | 8:58.81 | Beijing, China | 17 August 2008 |
| Olympic record | Gulnara Galkina (RUS) | 8:58.81 | Beijing, China | 17 August 2008 |
| 2012 World leading | Milcah Chemos Cheywa (KEN) | 9:07.14 | Oslo, Norway | 7 June 2012 |

== Schedule ==
All times are British Summer Time (UTC+1)

| Date | Time | Round |
|---|---|---|
| Saturday, 4 August 2012 | 11:35 | Round 1 |
| Monday, 6 August 2012 | 21:05 | Finals |

== Results ==
=== Round 1 ===
Official Video Highlights

Qual. rule: first 4 of each heat (Q) plus the 3 fastest times (q) qualified.

==== Heat 1 ====
| Rank | Name | Nationality | Result | Notes | Qual. |
|---|---|---|---|---|---|
| 1 | Gesa Felicitas Krause | Germany | 9:24.91 | PB | Q |
| 2 | Etenesh Diro | Ethiopia | 9:25.31 | | Q |
| 3 | Milcah Chemos Cheywa | Kenya | 9:27.09 | | Q |
| 4 | Polina Jelizarova | Latvia | 9:27.21 | NR | Q |
| 5 | Gulnara Galkina | Russia | 9:28.76 | | q |
| 6 | Barbara Parker | Great Britain | 9:32.07 | | |
| 7 | Li Zhenzhu | China | 9:34.29 | SB | |
| 8 | Diana Martín | Spain | 9:35.77 | PB | |
| 9 | Genevieve LaCaze | Australia | 9:37.90 | PB | |
| 10 | Korene Hinds | Jamaica | 9:37.95 | SB | |
| 11 | Salima El Ouali Alami | Morocco | 9:44.62 | | |
| 12 | Shalaya Kipp | United States | 9:48.33 | | |
| 13 | Sudha Singh | India | 9:48.86 | | |
| 14 | Sviatlana Kudzelich | Belarus | 9:54.77 | | |
| ~~15~~ | Binnaz Uslu | Turkey | ~~10:31.00~~ | | Doping |

==== Heat 2 ====
| Rank | Name | Nationality | Result | Notes | Qual. |
|---|---|---|---|---|---|
| 1 | Sofia Assefa | Ethiopia | 9:25.42 | | Q |
| 2 | Habiba Ghribi | Tunisia | 9:27.42 | SB | Q |
| 3 | Emma Coburn | United States | 9:27.51 | | Q |
| 4 | Marta Domínguez | Spain | 9:29.71 | | DSQ |
| 5 | Clarisse Cruz | Portugal | 9:30.06 | PB | q |
| 6 | Yelena Orlova | Russia | 9:33.14 | | |
| 7 | Valentyna Zhudina | Ukraine | 9:37.90 | | |
| 8 | Lydia Chebet Rotich | Kenya | 9:42.03 | | |
| 9 | Stephanie Reilly | Ireland | 9:44.77 | | |
| 10 | Gülcan Mıngır | Turkey | 9:47.35 | | DSQ |
| 11 | Katarzyna Kowalska | Poland | 9:48.60 | | |
| 12 | Beverly Ramos | Puerto Rico | 9:55.26 | | |
| 13 | Cristina Casandra | Romania | 9:58.83 | | |
| 14 | Yin Annuo | China | 10:09.10 | | |
| 15 | Ángela Figueroa | Colombia | 10:25.60 | | |

==== Heat 3 ====
| Rank | Name | Nationality | Result | Notes | Qual. |
|---|---|---|---|---|---|
| 1 | Hiwot Ayalew | Ethiopia | 9:24.01 | | Q |
| 2 | Yuliya Zaripova | Russia | 9:25.68 | | DSQ |
| 3 | Mercy Wanjiku Njoroge | Kenya | 9:25.99 | | Q |
| 4 | Antje Moldner-Schmidt | Germany | 9:26.57 | SB | Q |
| 5 | Bridget Franek | United States | 9:29.86 | | q |
| 6 | Ancuța Bobocel | Romania | 9:31.06 | | |
| 7 | Dorcus Inzikuru | Uganda | 9:35.29 | | |
| 8 | Sandra Eriksson | Finland | 9:50.71 | | |
| 9 | Eilish McColgan | Great Britain | 9:54.36 | | |
| 10 | Kaltoum Bouaasayriya | Morocco | 9:58.77 | | |
| 11 | Silvia Danekova | Bulgaria | 9:59.52 | | |
| ~~12~~ | Svitlana Shmidt | Ukraine | ~~10:01.09~~ | | Doping |
| 12 | Özlem Kaya | Turkey | 10:03.52 | | |
| 13 | Matylda Szlęzak | Poland | 10:08.84 | | |

=== Final ===
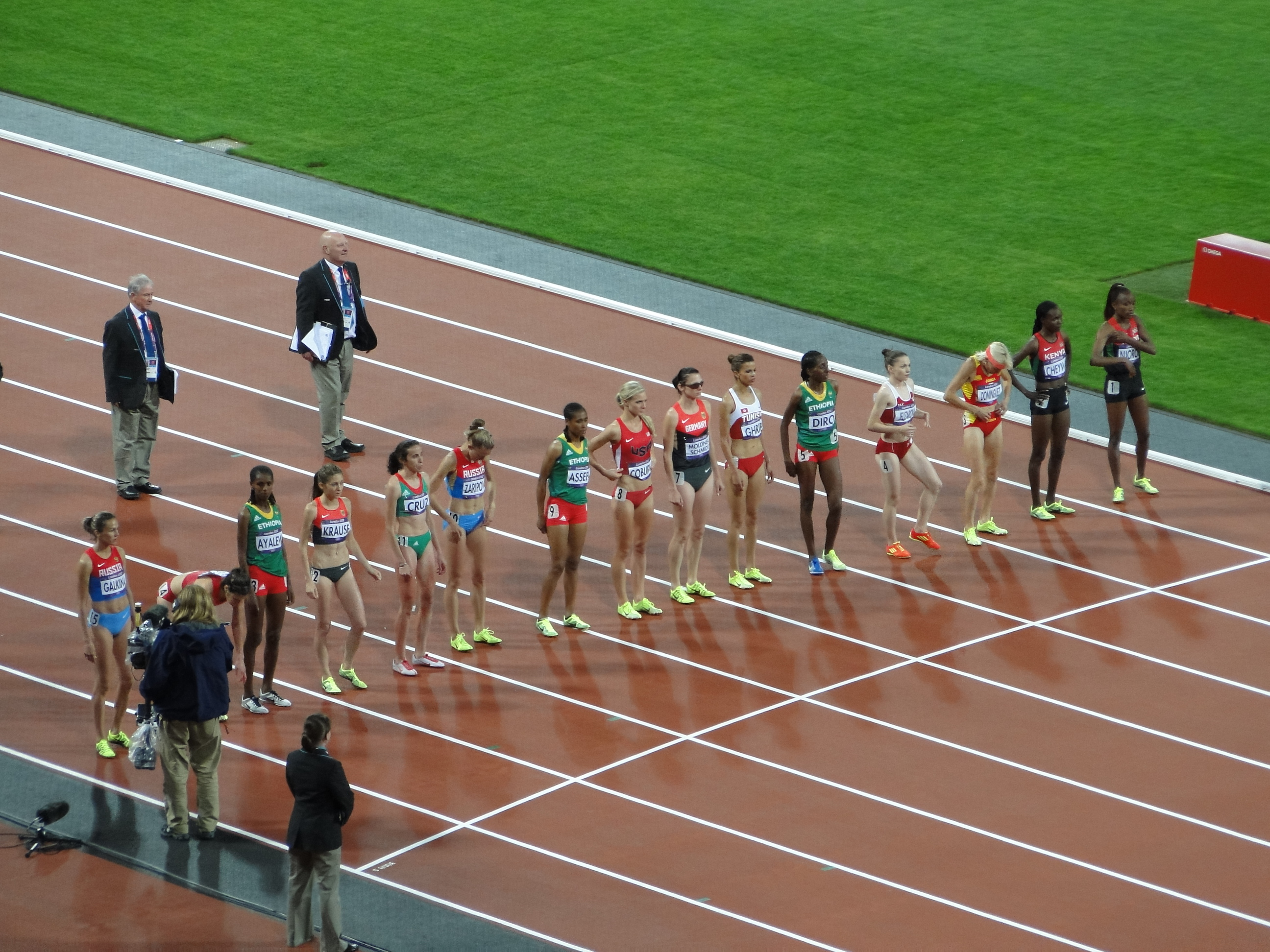
The runners line-up

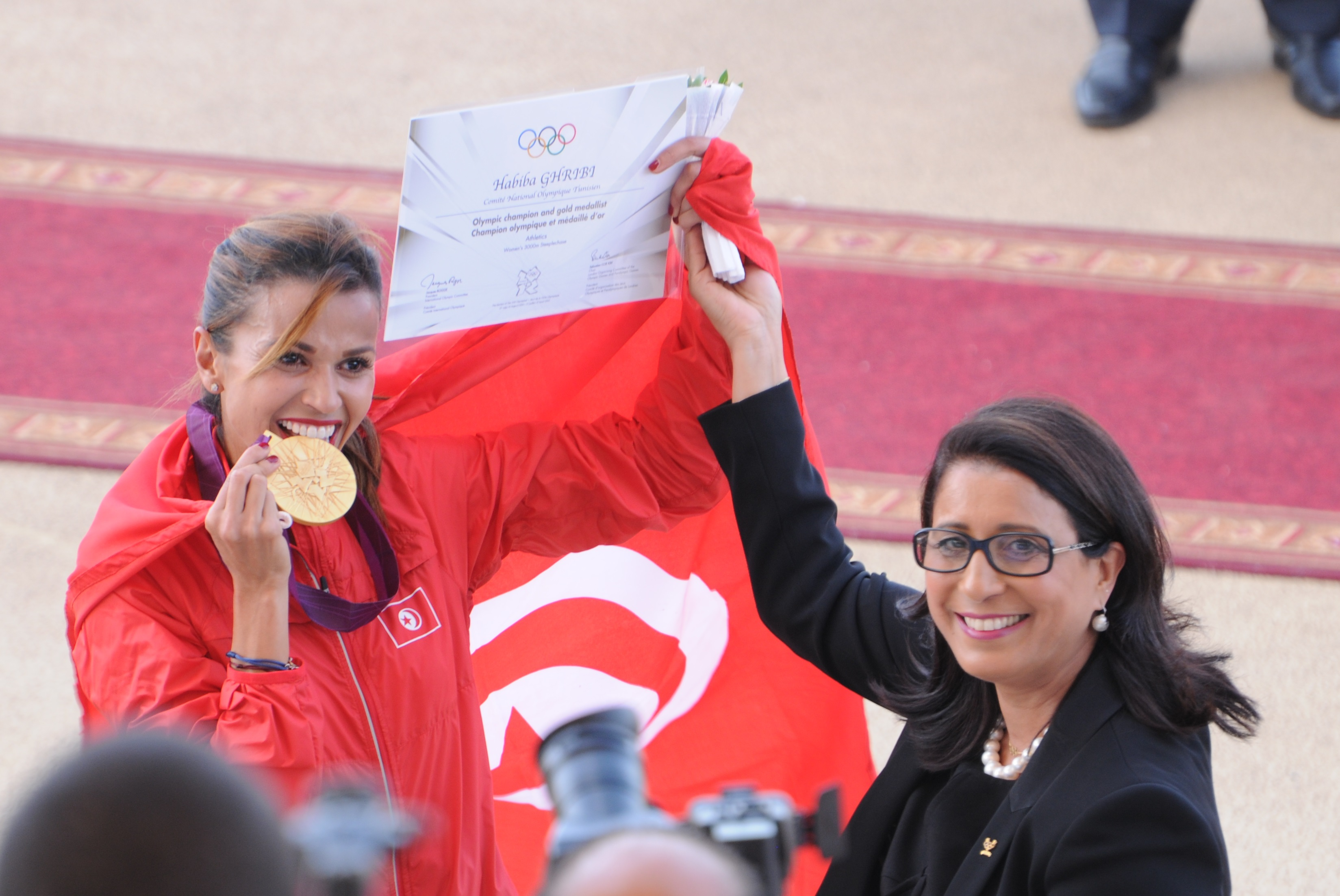
Habiba Ghribi during the Olympic gold medal ceremony for the 3000 steeplechase at the London 2012 Olympic Games, on 4 June 2016 at the Radès Olympic Athletics Stadium.

| Rank | Name | Nationality | Result | Notes |
|---|---|---|---|---|
| 1st place, gold medalist(s) | Habiba Ghribi | Tunisia | 9:08.37 | NR |
| 2nd place, silver medalist(s) | Sofia Assefa | Ethiopia | 9:09.84 | |
| 3rd place, bronze medalist(s) | Milcah Chemos Cheywa | Kenya | 9:09.88 | |
| 4 | Hiwot Ayalew | Ethiopia | 9:12.98 | |
| 5 | Etenesh Diro | Ethiopia | 9:19.89 | PB |
| 6 | Antje Moldner-Schmidt | Germany | 9:21.78 | SB |
| 7 | Gesa Felicitas Krause | Germany | 9:23.52 | PB |
| 8 | Emma Coburn | United States | 9:23.54 | PB |
| 9 | Mercy Wanjiku Njoroge | Kenya | 9:26.73 | |
| 10 | Clarisse Cruz | Portugal | 9:32.44 | |
| 11 | Polina Jelizarova | Latvia | 9:38.56 | |
| 12 | Bridget Franek | United States | 9:45.51 | |
| | Gulnara Galkina | Russia | DNF | |
| DSQ | Yuliya Zaripova | Russia | ~~9:06.72~~ | |
| DSQ | Marta Dominguez | Spain | ~~9:36.45~~ | |

^{1} On 24 March 2016, the Court of Arbitration for Sport disqualified Russian Yuliya Zaripova for doping and confirmed that she would be stripped of her gold medal. On 4 June 2016, the gold medal was officially reallocated to second place Habiba Ghribi from Tunisia by the IOC and IAAF updated the results. Marta Dominguez from Spain has been disqualified too.
