= Zemzem Ahmed =

Ethiopian runner

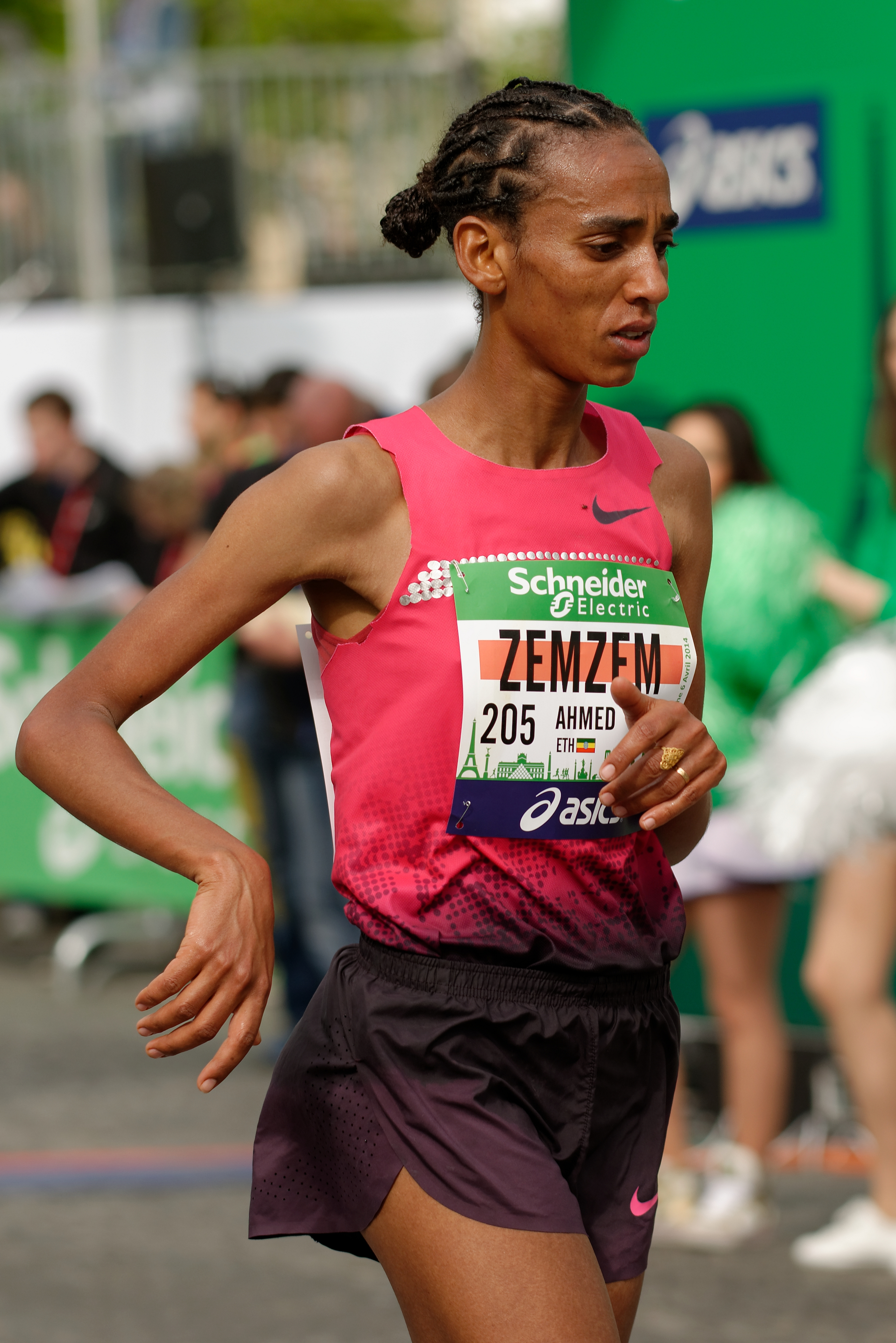
- Ahmed at the 2014 Paris Marathon

Personal information
- Full name: Zemzem Ahmed Deko
- Nationality: Ethiopia
- Born: 27 December 1984 (age 41) Asella, Ethiopia
- Height: 1.70 m (5 ft 7 in)
- Weight: 53 kg (117 lb)

Sport
- Sport: Athletics
- Event: Steeplechase
- Club: Banks SC (ETH)
Medal record
Women's athletics
Representing Ethiopia
African Championships
Gold medal – first place	2008 Addis Ababa	3000 m st.

Zemzem Ahmed Deko (born December 27, 1984, in Asella) is an Ethiopian steeplechase runner and road runner. She emerged as one of Ethiopia's top steeplechasers, and had broken her own personal records three times in 2007.

Zemzem represented Ethiopia at the 2008 Summer Olympics in Beijing, and competed in the women's 3000 m steeplechase, along with her teammates Sofia Assefa and Mekdes Bekele. She ran in the third heat of the competition, where she finished in fourth place and automatically advanced into the final, with a personal best time of 9:25.63. She bettered her performance in the final round, and set a national record, with a time of 9:17.85, just eight seconds faster than her own personal best, finishing only in seventh place.

She returned to the global stage at the 2009 World Championships in Athletics and finished tenth in the steeplechase with a run of 9:22.64 minutes. She did not compete in the 2010 and 2011 seasons and re-emerged in 2012 with a renewed focus as a long-distance road runner. She ran a personal best of 2:27:12 hours for the marathon in October, placing sixth at the high-profile Frankfurt Marathon. A half marathon best of 73:31 minutes followed at the Zhuhai Half Marathon, where she was third. She improved this to 73:25 minutes at the 2013 Houston Half Marathon.
