= 2012 African Championships in Athletics – Women's 3000 metres steeplechase =

The women's 3000 metres steeplechase at the 2012 African Championships in Athletics was held at the Stade Charles de Gaulle on 1 July.

== Medalists ==
Gold	Mercy Wanjiku; Kenya
Silver	Birtukan Adamu; Ethiopia
Bronze	Hyvin Kiyeng Jepkemoi; Kenya

== Records ==
Standing records prior to the 2012 African Championships in Athletics
World record	Gulnara Samitova-Galkina (RUS)	8:58.81	Beijing, PR China	17 August 2008
African record	Milcah Chemos Cheywa (KEN)	9:07.14	Oslo, Norway	7 June 2012
Championship record	Milcah Chemos Cheywa (KEN)	9:32.18	Nairobi, Kenya	31 July 2010

== Schedule ==
Date	Time	Round
1 July 2012	15:15	Final

== Results ==
=== Final ===
Rank	Name	Nationality	Time	Note
1st place, gold medalist(s)	Mercy Wanjiku	Kenya	9:43.26	
2nd place, silver medalist(s)	Birtukan Adamu	Ethiopia	9:45.41	
3rd place, bronze medalist(s)	Hyvin Kiyeng Jepkemoi	Kenya	9:45.95	
4	Mekdes Bekele	Ethiopia	9:53.97	
5	Eliene Saholinirina	Madagascar	9:56.70	
6	Lemelem Berha	Ethiopia	10:09.53	
7	Noleen Conrad	South Africa	10:15.30	
