= 2014 African Championships in Athletics – Women's 3000 metres steeplechase =

The women's 3000 metres steeplechase event at the 2014 African Championships in Athletics was held on August 14 on Stade de Marrakech.

== Results ==
| Rank | Name | Nationality | Time | Notes |
|---|---|---|---|---|
| 1st place, gold medalist(s) | Hiwot Ayalew | Ethiopia | 9:29.54 | CR |
| 2nd place, silver medalist(s) | Sofia Assefa | Ethiopia | 9:30.20 | |
| 3rd place, bronze medalist(s) | Salima Elouali Alami | Morocco | 9:33.02 | |
| 4 | Etenesh Diro | Ethiopia | 9:36.56 | |
| 5 | Habiba Ghribi | Tunisia | 9:41.30 | |
| 6 | Purity Kirui | Kenya | 9:50.87 | |
| 7 | Joan Kipkemoi | Kenya | 9:50.95 | |
| 8 | Eliane Saholinirina | Madagascar | 10:09.25 | |
| | Amina Bettiche | Algeria | DNF | |
