= Athletics at the 2007 All-Africa Games – Women's 3000 metres steeplechase =

The women's 3000 metres steeplechase at the 2007 All-Africa Games were held on July 20. This was the first time that this event was held at the All-Africa Games.

== Results ==
Rank	Name	Nationality	Time	Notes
1st place, gold medalist(s)	Ruth Bosibori	Kenya	9:31.99	
2nd place, silver medalist(s)	Mekdes Bekele	Ethiopia	9:49.95	
3rd place, bronze medalist(s)	Netsanet Achamo	Ethiopia	9:51.63	
4	Tebogo Masehla	South Africa	9:55.1	
5	Mercy Njoroge	Kenya	10:07.48	
6	Mana Durka	Sudan	10:25.71	
7	Thandi Malinde	South Africa	10:48.67	
8	Khadidja Touati	Algeria	11:09.98	
