= 2010 African Championships in Athletics – Women's 3000 metres steeplechase =

The women's 3000 metres steeplechase at the 2010 African Championships in Athletics were held on July 31.

== Results ==
Rank	Name	Nationality	Time	Notes
1st place, gold medalist(s)	Milcah Chemos Cheywa	Kenya	9:32.18	CR
2nd place, silver medalist(s)	Sofia Assefa	Ethiopia	9:32.58	
3rd place, bronze medalist(s)	Lydiah Rotich	Kenya	9:37.32	SB
4	Mercy Njoroge	Kenya	9:38.79	SB
5	Hanane Ouhaddou	Morocco	9:43.13	
6	Mekdes Bekele	Ethiopia	9:50.77	
7	Halima Haasen	Ethiopia	10:11.10	
8	Eliane Saholinirina	Madagascar	10:33.56	
9	Myrette Filmalter	South Africa	11:23.21	
	Tebogo Masehla	South Africa	DNF	
