= Hiwot Ayalew =

Ethiopian long-distance runner (born 1990)

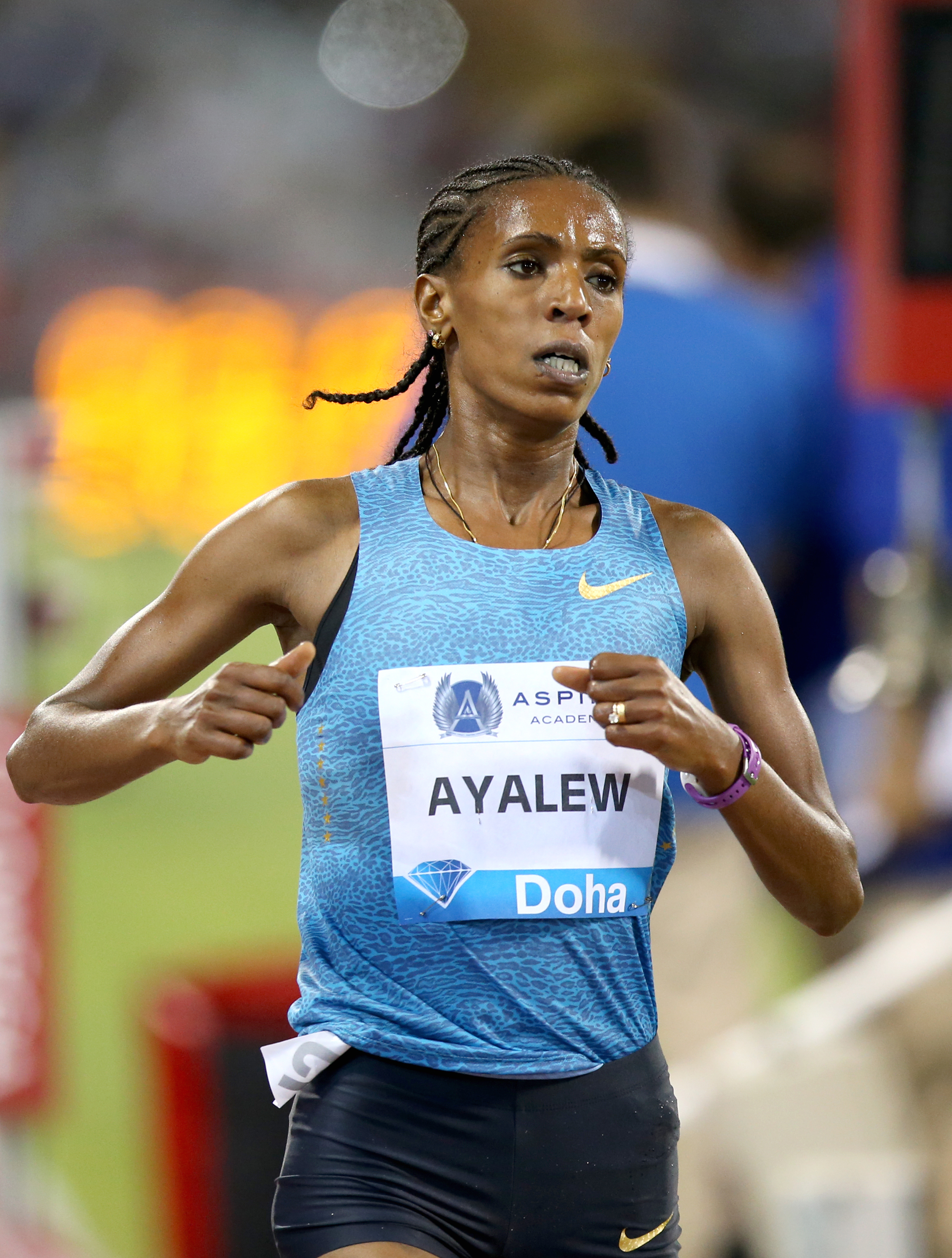
- Hiwot at the 2015 IAAF Diamond League meeting in Doha

Personal information
- Born: March 6, 1990 (age 36)
- Height: 1.73 m (5 ft 8 in)
- Weight: 53 kg (117 lb)

Sport
- Country: Ethiopia
- Sport: Track and field
- Event: 3000m steeplechase
Medal record
Women's athletics
Representing Ethiopia
All-Africa Games
Silver medal – second place	2011 Maputo	3000 m st.
Silver medal – second place	2015 Brazzaville	3000 m st.
African Championships
Gold medal – first place	2014 Marrakesh	3000 m st.

Hiwot Ayalew Yimer (Amharic: ህይወት ፡ አያሌው; born 6 March 1990) is an Ethiopian professional long-distance runner whose speciality is the 3000 metres steeplechase. She represented Ethiopia in the event at the 2012 Summer Olympics, finishing fifth.

== Life and career ==
Born in Gojjam, she is the younger sister of Wude Ayalew, a medallist at the 2009 World Championships in Athletics. Hiwot made her first impact in athletics in 2010. She came third over 5000 metres at the Ethiopian Championships then won the Addis Ababa Cross Country race in December. She opened 2011 with a win at the Cross Ouest-France in Le Mans, France. Running for the Commercial Bank of Ethiopia, she took second place at the Jan Meda Cross Country in 2011 which gained her a place on the national team.

In her first international appearance she finished eleventh in the women's senior race at the 2011 IAAF World Cross Country Championships. She competed on the 2011 IAAF Diamond League track circuit and established herself further. She ran a 5000 m best of 14:49.36 minutes for eighth at the Bislett Games then came seventh at the Meeting Areva. Visa issues meant she arrived hours before the start of the London Grand Prix, but she proved herself in the steeplechase with a personal best of 9:23.88 minutes to take second place behind Milcah Chemos Cheywa. Although she missed a place at the World Championships, she was present for the 2011 All-Africa Games and won the silver medal in the steeplechase behind Kenya's Hyvin Jepkemoi, being edged out at the line by a fraction of a second.

Following her track season, she had fourth-place finishes at the Great Ethiopian Run 10K road race and the Cross de Atapuerca. At the start of 2012, she finished as the runner-up behind her sister at the Elgoibar Cross Country. A win at the national championships earned her a spot on the Ethiopian team for the 2012 London Olympics and she managed to finish fifth in the Olympic steeplechase final. She also performed well on the 2012 IAAF Diamond League circuit, having top three placings at the Bislett Games, Prefontaine Classic and Weltklasse Zurich meets. At the end of the year she won the Cross de Atapuerca.

She won at the 2013 Jan Meda International to gain selection for Ethiopia at the 2013 IAAF World Cross Country Championships. At the 2013 World Championship, she finished in 4th place, and 6th two years later in Beijing. In 2014, she won the African Championship in the 3000 metres.
