= Kaltoum Bouaasayriya =

Moroccan athlete

Kaltoum Bouaasayriya (born 23 August 1982 in Assa-Zag Province) is a Moroccan athlete. She competed in the 3000 metres steeplechase at the 2012 Summer Olympics, placing 36th with a time of 9:58.77.
