= Netsanet Achamo =

Ethiopian long-distance runner

Netsanet Achamo (born December 14, 1987) is an Ethiopian long-distance runner.

She finished in 4th at the 2006 African Championships in Athletics in the 3000 metres steeplechase.

Achamo competed at the 2007 World Championships in Athletics in the 3000 metres steeplechase, but did not make it out of the heats.

She captured bronze at the 2007 All-Africa Games in the 3000 metres steeplechase.

Achamo won the 2011 Olomouc Half Marathon, 2012 Mumbai Marathon, and the 2012 Hamburg Marathon.
