= Birtukan Adamu =

Ethiopian athletics competitor

Personal information
- Born: 29 April 1992 (age 34)

Sport
- Sport: Track and field
- Event: 3000 metres steeplechase
Medal record
Women's athletics
Representing Ethiopia
African Championships
Silver medal – second place	2012 Porto-Novo	3000 m st.

Birtukan Adamu Ali (born 29 April 1992) is an Ethiopian runner competing primarily in the 3000 metres steeplechase. She represented her country at the 2011 World Championships finishing twelfth. She is the current world junior record holder in the event.

== Competition record ==
Year	Competition	Venue	Position	Event	Notes
Representing Ethiopia
2010	World Junior Championships	Moncton, Canada	2nd	3000 m s'chase	9:43.23
2011	African Junior Championships	Gaborone, Botswana	1st	3000 m s'chase	9:53.80
2011	World Championships	Daegu, South Korea	12th	3000 m s'chase	10:05.10
2011	All-Africa Games	Maputo, Mozambique	3rd	3000 m s'chase	10:02.22
2012	African Championships	Porto-Novo, Benin	2nd	3000 m s'chase	9:45.41
2016	African Championships	Durban, South Africa	5th	3000 m s'chase	9:50.52

== Personal bests ==
Outdoor

- 3000 metres steeplechase – 9:20.37 (Rome 2011)

Indoor

- 3000 metres – 8:58.73 (Karlsruhe 2012)
- 5000 metres – 15:34.15 (Stockholm 2015)
