= Madagascar at the 2013 World Championships in Athletics =

- WA code: MAD

in Moscow
- Competitors: 2
- Medals: Gold 0 Silver 0 Bronze 0 Total 0

World Championships in Athletics appearances
- 1983; 1987; 1991; 1993; 1995; 1997; 1999; 2001; 2003; 2005; 2007; 2009; 2011; 2013; 2015; 2017; 2019; 2022; 2023

Madagascar competed at the 2013 World Championships in Athletics in Moscow, Russia, from 10 to 18 August 2013. A team of 2 athlete was announced to represent the country in the event.

== Results ==
(q – qualified, NM – no mark, SB – season best)

=== Men ===
Ali Kamé	Decathlon			
Ali Kamé	Event	Results	Points	Rank
	100 m	11.48	757	33
	Long jump	6.72 SB	748	30
	Shot put	12.73	651	33
	High jump	1.90 SB	714	24
	400 m	50.87 SB	775	25
	110 m hurdles	15.20 SB	825	23
	Discus throw	36.86	601	27
	Pole vault	4.20 SB	673	25
	Javelin throw	65.76 PB	825	8
	1500 m	did not start		
Total			did not finish	

=== Women ===
Athlete	Event	Preliminaries		Heats		Semifinals		Final	
Athlete	Event	Time	Rank	Time	Rank	Time	Rank	Time	Rank
Eliane Saholinirina	1500 metres			4:18.04 SB	36	did not advance			
