= 2016 African Championships in Athletics – Women's 3000 metres steeplechase =

The women's 3000 metres steeplechase event at the 2016 African Championships in Athletics was held on 26 June in Kings Park Stadium.

== Results ==
Rank	Athlete	Nationality	Time	Notes
1st place, gold medalist(s)	Norah Jeruto	Kenya	9:25.07	CR
2nd place, silver medalist(s)	Agnes Chesang	Kenya	9:27.22	
3rd place, bronze medalist(s)	Weyneshet Ansa	Ethiopia	9:39.89	
4	Eliane Saholinirina	Madagascar	9:44.50	NR
5	Birtukan Adamu	Ethiopia	9:50.52	
6	Saara Martin	Namibia	12:05.11	
	Fadoua Sidi Madane	Morocco	DNF	
	Nolene Conrad	South Africa	DNF	
	Etenesh Diro	Ethiopia	DNF	
