= Yin Anna =

Chinese long-distance runner

Yin Anna (born 23 March 1992 in Shandong) is a Chinese long-distance runner who specializes in the 3000 metres steeplechase.

== Doping ==
Yin Anna tested positive for EPO on 7 September 2014, and was subsequently handed a two-year ban from sport.

== See also ==
- China at the 2012 Summer Olympics - Athletics
  - Athletics at the 2012 Summer Olympics – Women's 3000 metres steeplechase
