= Athletics at the 2011 All-Africa Games – Women's 3000 metres steeplechase =

Athletic event of 2011

The women's 3000 metres steeplechase event at the 2011 All-Africa Games was held on 13 September.

== Results ==
Rank	Name	Nationality	Time	Notes
1st place, gold medalist(s)	Hyvin Jepkemoi	Kenya	10:00.50	
2nd place, silver medalist(s)	Hiwot Ayalew	Ethiopia	10:00.57	
3rd place, bronze medalist(s)	Birtukan Adamu	Ethiopia	10:02.22	
4	Lydiah Chepkurui	Kenya	10:03.69	
5	Janet Achola	Uganda	10:23.16	
