= Mekdes Bekele =

Ethiopian steeplechase runner

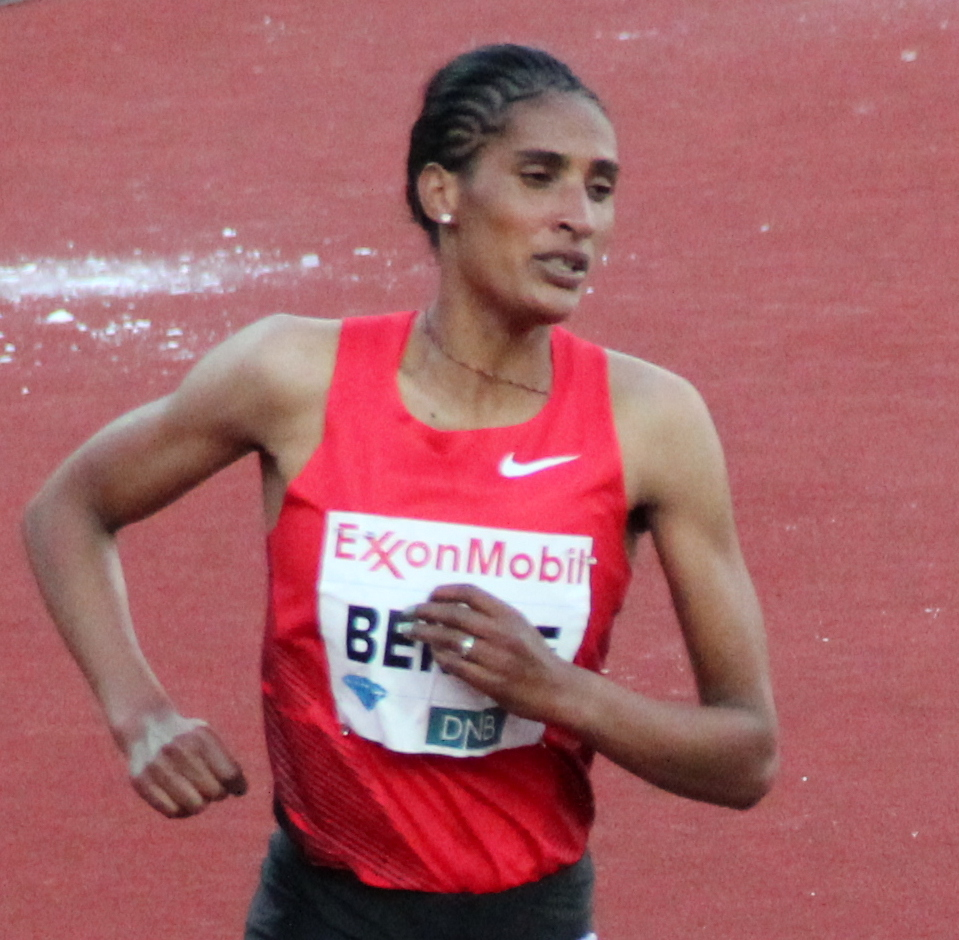
- Bekele at the 2012 Bislett Games

Medal record

Women's athletics

Representing Ethiopia

African Championships
Silver medal – second place	2008 Addis Ababa	3000 m st.

Mekdes Bekele Tadese (Amharic: መቅደስ በቀለ ታደሰ; born 20 January 1987) is an Ethiopian runner who specializes in the 3000 metres steeplechase.

== Competition record ==
Year	Competition	Venue	Position	Event	Notes
Representing Ethiopia
2006	World Junior Championships	Beijing, China	3rd	3000 m s'chase	9:48.67
2007	All-Africa Games	Algiers, Algeria	2nd	3000 m s'chase	9:49.95
2007	World Championships	Osaka, Japan	20th (h)	3000 m s'chase	9:50.12
2008	African Championships	Addis Ababa, Ethiopia	2nd	3000 m s'chase	9:59.52
2008	Olympic Games	Beijing, China	26th (h)	3000 m s'chase	9:41.43
2010	African Championships	Nairobi, Kenya	6th	3000 m s'chase	9:50.77
2012	African Championships	Porto-Novo, Benin	4th	3000 m s'chase	9:53.97

== Personal bests ==
- 3000 metres steeplechase - 9:32.05 min (2007)
- 5000 metres - 15:49.71 min (2006)
