= Lydia Rotich =

Kenyan long-distance runner

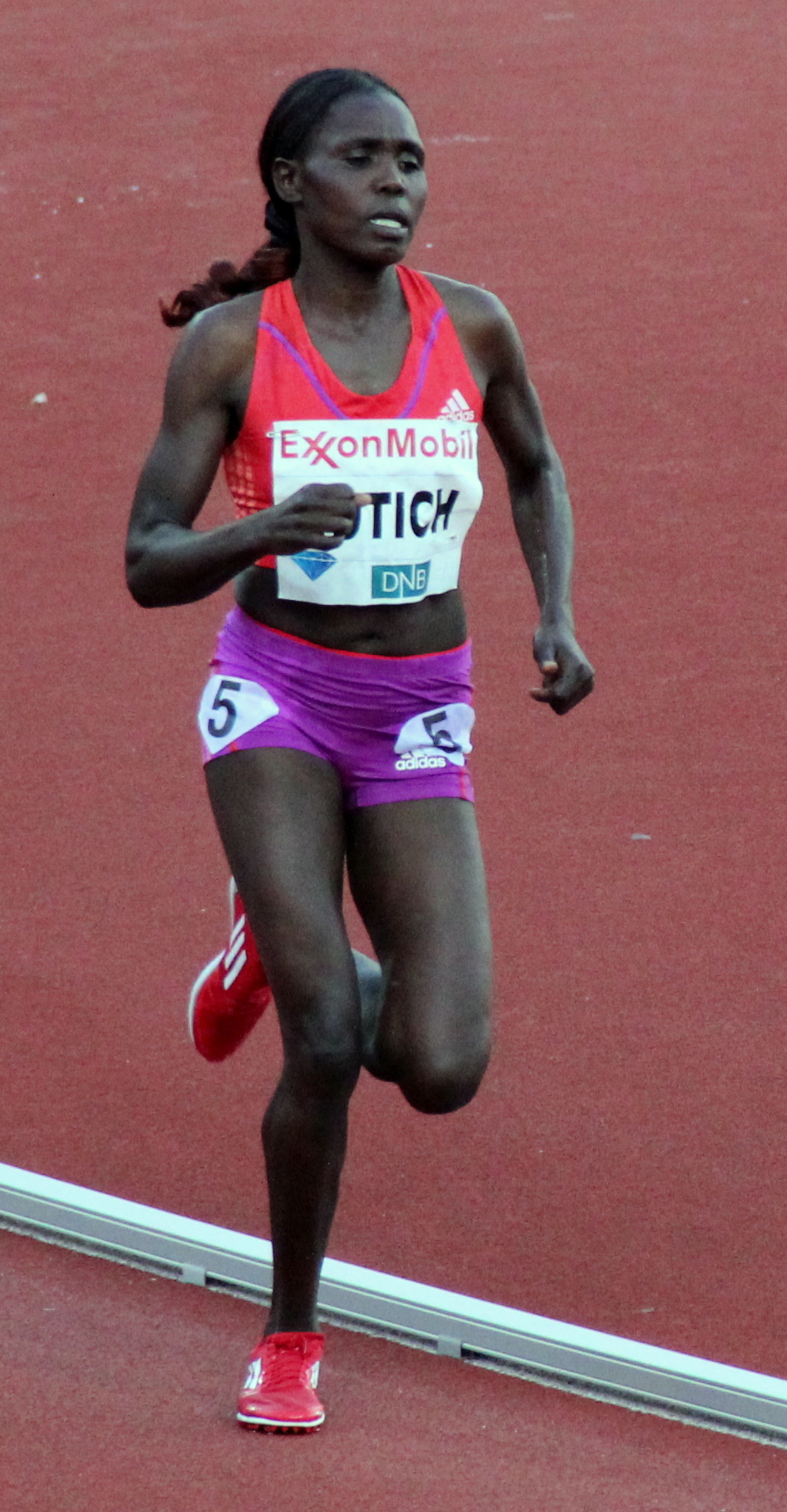
- Lydia Rotich at the 2012 Bislett Games

Personal information
- Born: August 8, 1988 (age 38) Keiyo District, Rift Valley Province
- Height: 1.57 m (5 ft 2 in)
- Weight: 45 kg (99 lb)

Sport
- Country: Kenya
- Sport: Track and field
- Event: 3000m steeplechase
Medal record
Women's athletics
Representing Kenya
African Championships
Bronze medal – third place	2010 Nairobi	3000 m st.

Lydia Chebet Rotich (born 8 August 1988) is a Kenyan long-distance runner who specializes in the 3000 metres steeplechase.

She finished fifth at the 2009 World Athletics Final and fourth at the 2011 World Championships. Her personal best time is 9:18.03 minutes, achieved in June 2010 in Oslo. She competed at the 2012 and 2016 Summer Olympics. In the 2012 Summer Olympics she finished seventh with a time of 9:42.03 in Round One, Heat Two. In the 2016 Summer Olympics she finished fifth in Round One, Heat One; which lead to her competing in the final where she came thirteenth with a time of 9:29.90.

She works as a police traffic officer. Her uncle Fred Chesengor is a physiotherapist for the Kenyan national team, particularly the Paralympic team.

She competed in the 5000 m at the 2005 National Secondary Schools competition but did not perform well. She switched to the steeplechase hoping to do better. In 2006, she reached the final of the National Secondary Schools competition in the steeplechase, but did not make the Kenyan team for the World Juniors.

She missed the second half of 2007 due to malaria.

In 2008 she won the Kenyan trials for the 16th CAA Africa Athletics Championships, beating Ruth Bosibori. Unfortunately, when she travelled to Addis Ababa for the African Athletics Championships, she had a massive allergic reaction, preventing her from competing. That year, she also broke the 10 minute barrier for the first time. However, she missed out on selection for the 2008 Olympics at the Kenyan national trials.

She came third in 2009 Kenyan championships, and second at the 2010 Kenyan championships.
