= Madagascar at the 1983 World Championships in Athletics =

- Flag of Madagascar
- WA code: MAD

in Helsinki, Finland August 7–14, 1983
- Competitors: 1 (1 man) in 2 events

World Championships in Athletics appearances
- 1983; 1987; 1991; 1993; 1995; 1997; 1999; 2001; 2003; 2005; 2007; 2009; 2011; 2013; 2015; 2017; 2019; 2022; 2023

Madagascar competed at the 1983 World Championships in Athletics in Helsinki, Finland, from August 7 to 14, 1983.

== Men ==
Track and road events

Athlete	Event	Heat		Semifinal		Final	
Athlete	Event	Result	Rank	Result	Rank	Result	Rank
Tisbite Rakotoarisoa	800 metres	1:50.70	45	Did not advance			
Tisbite Rakotoarisoa	1500 metres	3:52.91	45	Did not advance			
