= Ruth Bosibori =

Kenyan middle-distance runner (born 1988)

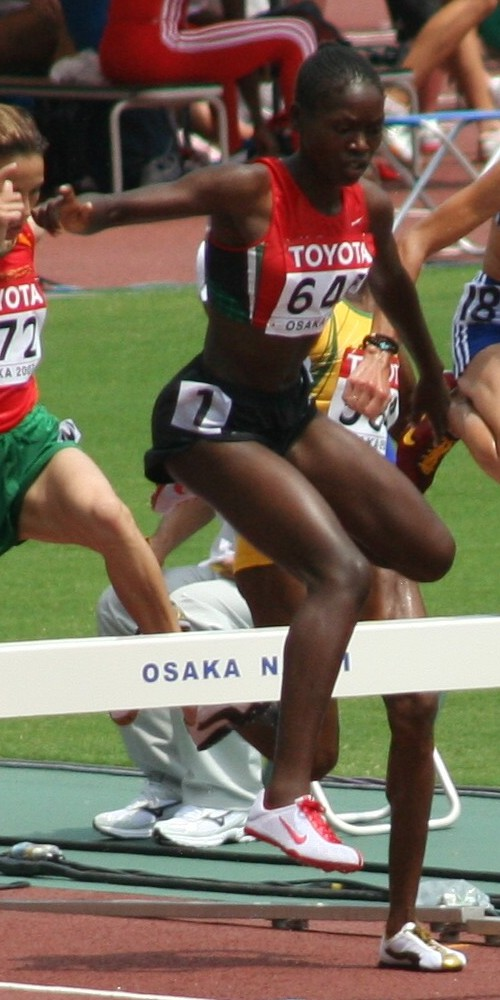
- Bosibori in 2009

Medal record

Women's athletics

Representing Kenya

African Championships
Bronze medal – third place	2008 Addis Ababa	3000 m st.

Ruth Bosibori Nyangau (also written Ruth Bisibori; born 2 January 1988 in Bosiango) is a Kenyan middle-distance runner who specializes in the 3000 metres steeplechase.

== Career ==
In July 2007, she became the first All-Africa Games champion in the event, as it was staged for the first time. In August the same year she finished fourth at the World Championships in a world junior record time of 9:25.25 minutes. The old record was 9:30.70 and belonged to Melissa Rollison. At the 2008 African Championships in Athletics she finished third.

Bosibori was born in Bosiango village near Kisii. She started running in 2003 while at Kebirichi Secondary School. She was recruited by Kenya Police after winning provincial championships in 2007. She is used to competing barefoot.

She won the Most Promising Sportswoman of the Year category at the 2007 Kenyan Sports Personality of the Year awards. She was coached by Dan Muchoki until 2007, after started to be followed by the Italian coach Renato Canova, when went under the management of Gianni Demadonna.

In 2009, she improved her personal best to 9:13.16, winning at the 2009 IAAF World Athletics Final by a margin of seven seconds.

In September 2010, she gave birth to her daughter Glory.

== Achievements ==
Year	Competition	Venue	Position	Event	Notes
Representing Kenya
2007	All-Africa Games	Algiers, Algeria	1st	3000 m s'chase	9:31.99
2007	World Championships	Osaka, Japan	4th	3000 m s'chase	9:25.25
2008	African Championships	Addis Ababa, Ethiopia	3rd	3000 m s'chase	10:00.18
2008	Olympic Games	Beijing, China	6th	3000 m s'chase	9:17.35
2008	World Athletics Final	Stuttgart, Germany	3rd	3000 m s'chase	9:24.38
2009	World Championships	Berlin, Germany	7th	3000 m s'chase	9:13.16
2009	World Athletics Final	Thessaloniki, Greece	1st	3000 m s'chase	9:13.43
