= Salima El Ouali Alami =

Moroccan steeplechase runner

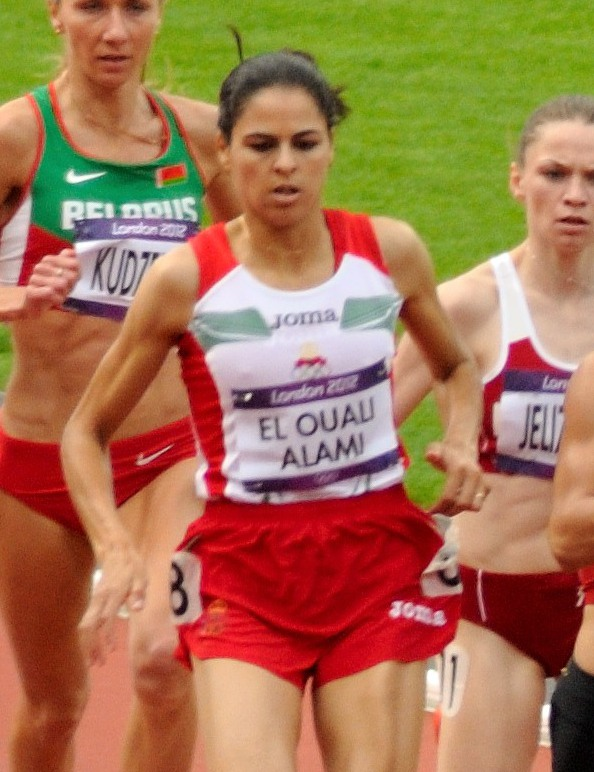
- Salima Elouali Alami at the 2012 Summer Olympics

Personal information
- Born: 29 December 1983 (age 42)
- Height: 1.79 m (5 ft 10 1/2 in)
- Weight: 58 kg (128 lb)

Sport
- Country: Morocco
- Sport: Track and field
- Event: 3000m steeplechase
Medal record
Women's athletics
Representing Morocco
African Championships
Bronze medal – third place	2014 Marrakesh	3000 m st.
Mediterranean Games
Silver medal – second place	Mersin 2013	3000 m st.

Salima Elouali Alami (born 29 December 1983) is a Moroccan athlete. She was born in Karia Ba Mohamed. She competed in the 3,000 metres steeplechase at the 2012 Summer Olympics, placing 26th with a time of 9:44.62.

Alami also won the silver medal at the 2013 Mediterranean Games and a bronze at the 2014 African Championships, both in the 3,000 meters steeplechase.
