= Etenesh Diro =

Ethiopian long-distance runner

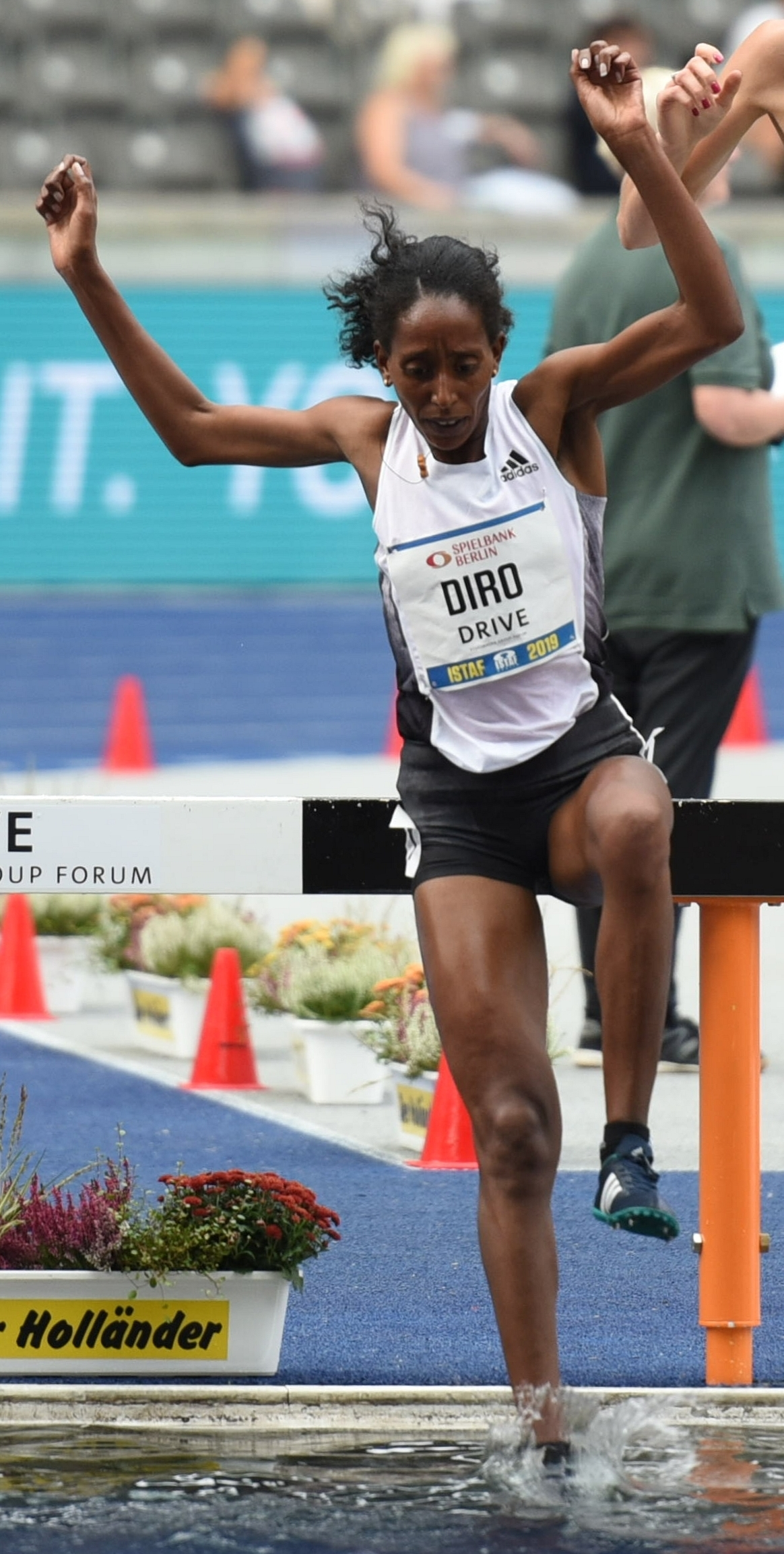
- Etenesh in 2019

Personal information
- Born: 10 May 1991 (age 35)
- Height: 1.68 m (5 ft 6 in)
- Weight: 49 kg (108 lb)

Sport
- Country: Ethiopia
- Sport: Track and field
- Event: 3000m steeplechase

Etenesh Diro Neda (born 10 May 1991) is an Ethiopian athlete. She competed in the 3000 metres steeplechase at the 2012 Summer Olympics and the 2016 Summer Olympics. In 2012, she qualified for the final by placing second in her heat with a time of 9:25.31, then placed sixth in the final with a time of 9:19.89, a personal best. At the 2016 Olympics, she was implicated in a collision and lost one shoe. Unable to put it back without losing too much time, she finished the qualifier in 7th place with only one shoe. Because of that, she was affectionately named the Cinderella of Rio2016.

== Achievements ==
Year	Competition	Venue	Position	Event	Notes
Representing Ethiopia
2012	Olympic Games	London, United Kingdom	6th	3000 m st.	9:19.89
2013	World Championships	Moscow, Russia	5th	3000 m st.	9:16.97
2015	World Championships	Beijing, China	17th (h)	3000 m st.	9:31.97
2016	African Championships	Durban, South Africa	–	3000 m s'chase	DNF
2016	Olympic Games	Rio de Janeiro, Brazil	15th	3000 m s'chase	9:38.77
2017	World Championships	London, United Kingdom	7th	3000 m s'chase	9:22.46
