= Mercy Wanjiku =

Kenyan long-distance runner

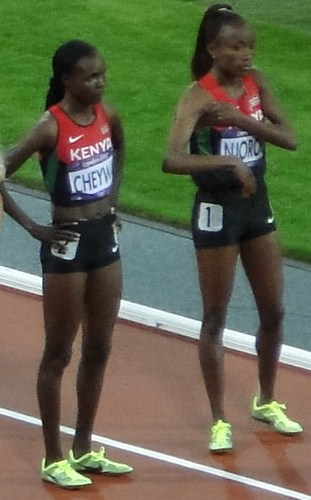
- Wanjiku (right) at the start line for the 2012 Olympic steeplechase final

Medal record

Women's athletics

Representing Kenya

World Championships
Bronze medal – third place	2011 Daegu	3000 m st.

African Championships
Gold medal – first place	2012 Porto-Novo	3000 m st.

Commonwealth Games
Silver medal – second place	2010 New Delhi	3000 m st.

Mercy Wanjikū Njoroge (born 10 June 1986) is a Kenyan long-distance runner who specializes in the steeplechase.

She finished fourth in 3000 metres steeplechase at the 2004 World Junior Championships as well as in the junior race at the 2005 World Cross Country Championships. She claimed the steeplechase title at the 2005 African Junior Athletics Championships.

Moving into the senior ranks, at the 2006 World Cross Country Championships she finished twelfth in the long race, helping the Kenyans to the silver medal in the team competition. She was fifth in the steeplechase at both the 2007 All-Africa Games and 2008 African Championships in Athletics. Njoroge won the silver medal in the steeplechase behind Milcah Chemos Cheywa at the 2010 Commonwealth Games in New Delhi.

She opened her 2011 season with an indoor 3000 m best of 8:50.32 minutes to win at the Sparkassen Cup.

She is based at the PACE Sports Management training camp in Kaptagat.

== Personal bests ==
- 3000 metres - 8:48.16 min (2006)
- 3000 metres steeplechase - 9:16.94 min (2011)
- 5000 metres - 15:17.03 min (2011)
