= Sofia Assefa =

Ethiopian long-distance runner

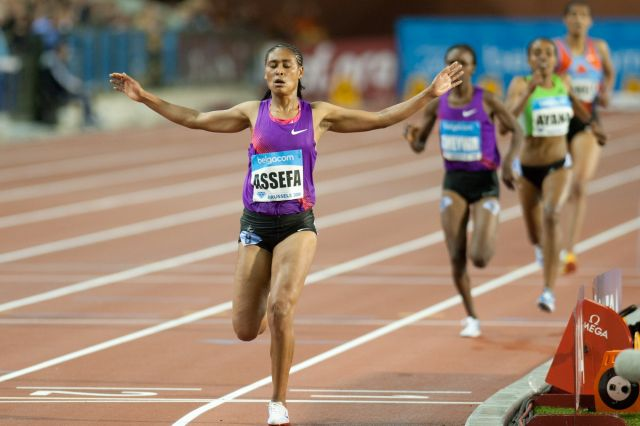
- Assefa at the 2010 Memorial van Damme

Personal information
- Born: 14 November 1987 (age 38) Addis Ababa, Ethiopia
- Height: 1.67 m (5 ft 5 1/2 in)
- Weight: 52 kg (115 lb)

Sport
- Country: Ethiopia
- Sport: Track and field
- Event: 3000m steeplechase
Medal record
Women's athletics
Representing Ethiopia
Olympic Games
Silver medal – second place	2012 London	3000 m st.
World Championships
Bronze medal – third place	2013 Moscow	3000 m st.
Continental Cup
Bronze medal – third place	2010 Split	3000 m st.
African Games
Gold medal – first place	2015 Brazzaville	3000 m st.
African Championships
Silver medal – second place	2010 Nairobi	3000 m st.
Silver medal – second place	2014 Marrakesh	3000 m st.

Sofia Assefa (Amharic: ሶፍአ አሠፋ; born 14 November 1987) is an Ethiopian long-distance runner who specializes in the 3,000 metres steeplechase. She was the silver medalist at the 2012 Summer Olympics.

== Career ==
She also competed at the 2008 Olympic Games without reaching the final. She finished thirteenth at the 2009 World Championships and fourth at the 2009 World Athletics Final.

She won the silver medal in the 3,000 metre steeplechase at the 2012 Summer Olympics, with a time of 9:09.84 minutes. Her 3,000-metre steeplechase personal best was also set in 2012, a time of 9:09.00 set in Oslo in June that year.

In 2013, she won the bronze medal at the World Championships in Moscow; and in 2015 she won the gold medal at the African Games in Brazzaville.

Her 5,000-metre personal best is 15:59.74 minutes, achieved in July 2007 in Liège.

== Early career ==
Assefa's athletics career began in 2003, when she competed in the Adjibar high school competition in Tenta, her home district, in the region of South Wollo. She was selected to represent her region. In the regional competition, she ran the 5000 m, instead of the sprints that she had competed in previously. She was still successful though.

After competing unsuccessfully in the 2005 Ethiopian national championships, she chose to quit school and move to Addis Ababa. There, she joined the Ethiopian Bank club. The club already had athletes competing in the 5000 and 10000 m, so they wanted her to compete in the 3000 m steeplechase. Although she didn't like the event, she competed for the club at the 2006 Ethiopian championships in this event. To her own surprise, she won the bronze.

Her success encouraged her, and she joined the club as one of their steeplechasers.

In 2007, she narrowly failed to qualify for the Ethiopian team for the World Championships.

In 2008, she finished 4th in the African Championships. At the 2008 Olympics, a technical error at one of the jumps lead to her failing to qualify from the heats.

At the 2009 World Championships, she reached the final but finished in 13th place. In the same year, she finished in 4th at the World Athletics Final.

She won silver at the 2010 African Athletics Championships, finishing 40 hundredths of a second behind the winner, Kenya's Milcah Chemos.
