= Eliane Saholinirina =

Malagasy runner

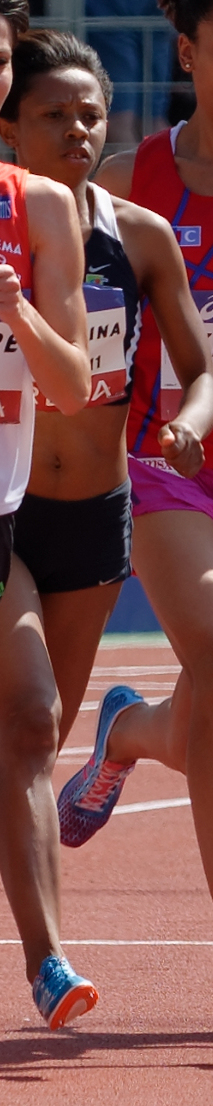
- Saholinirina in 2013

Personal information
- Born: 20 March 1982 (age 44) Betsihaka, Madagascar
- Height: 1.54 m (5 ft 1 in)
- Weight: 46 kg (101 lb)

Sport
- Sport: Athletics
- Events: 1500 m, 3000 m steeplechase
- Club: Stade Sottevillais 76*
- Coached by: Kader-Sofiane MIS

Marie Eliane Saholinirina (born 20 March 1983) is a Malagasy athlete who specialises in the 3000 metres steeplechase. She competed for Madagascar at the 2012 Summer Olympics failing to qualify for the semifinals.

She competed in the 3000 m steeplechase at the 2016 Summer Olympics in Rio de Janeiro. She finished 11th in her heat with a time of 9:45.92 and did not qualify for the final. She was the flagbearer for Madagascar during the Parade of Nations.

== Competition record ==
Year	Competition	Venue	Position	Event	Notes
Representing Madagascar
2001	African Junior Championships	Réduit, Mauritius	7th	800 m	2:16.42
2001	African Junior Championships	Réduit, Mauritius	3rd	1500 m	4:24.76
2006	African Championships	Bambous, Mauritius	11th (h)	800 m	2:10.39
2007	All-Africa Games	Algiers, Algeria	9th (h)	800 m	2:08.03
2007	World Championships	Osaka, Japan	36th (h)	800 m	2:06.57
2009	World Championships	Berlin, Germany	35th (h)	1500 m	4:16.63
2010	World Indoor Championships	Doha, Qatar	–	1500 m	DNF
2010	African Championships	Nairobi, Kenya	12th	1500 m	4:25.60
2010	African Championships	Nairobi, Kenya	8th	3000 m s'chase	10:33.56
2012	Olympic Games	London, United Kingdom	41st (h)	1500 m	4:19.46
2013	World Championships	Moscow, Russia	36th (h)	1500 m	4:18.04
2013	Jeux de la Francophonie	Nice, France	5th	3000 m s'chase	10:15.64
2014	World Indoor Championships	Sopot, Poland	19th (h)	1500 m	4:19.64
2014	African Championships	Marrakesh, Morocco	8th	3000 m s'chase	10:09.25
2015	World Championships	Beijing, China	32nd (h)	1500 m	4:19.54
2016	African Championships	Durban, South Africa	4th	3000 m s'chase	9:44.50
2016	Olympic Games	Rio de Janeiro, Brazil	35th (h)	3000 m s'chase	9:45.92
2017	World Championships	London, United Kingdom	42nd (h)	1500 m	4:23.56
2018	World Indoor Championships	Birmingham, United Kingdom	–	1500 m	DNF

== Personal bests ==
Outdoor

- 800 metres – 2:06.57 (Osaka 2007)
- 1500 metres – 4:15.13 (Oordegem (Bel) 2016)
- 3000 metres steeplechase – 9:44.50 (Durban 2016)

Indoor

- 800 metres – 2:09.39 (Eaubonne 2010)
- 1000 metres – 2:46.22 (Eaubonne 2012)
- 1500 metres – 4:19.64 (Sopot 2014)

Olympic Games
Preceded by Fetra Ratsimiziva	Flagbearer for Madagascar; 2016 Rio de Janeiro	Succeeded by Mialitiana Clerc
