= Milcah Chemos Cheywa =

Kenyan runner (born 1986)

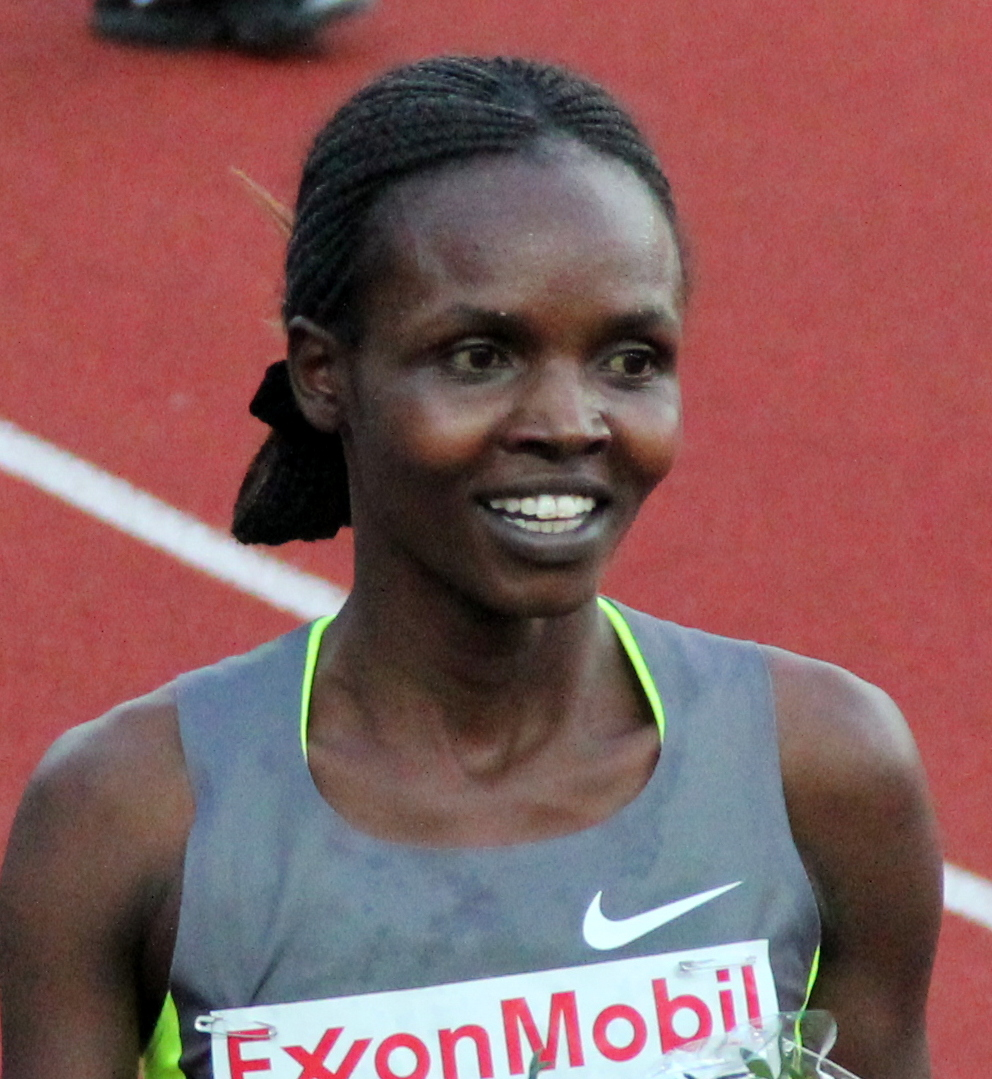
- Chemos as the 2012 Bislett Games

Medal record

Women's athletics

Representing Kenya

Olympic Games
Bronze medal – third place	2012 London	3000 m st.

World Championships
Gold medal – first place	2013 Moscow	3000 m st.
Silver medal – second place	2009 Berlin	3000 m st.
Silver medal – second place	2011 Daegu	3000 m st.

African Championships
Gold medal – first place	2010 Nairobi	3000 m st.

Commonwealth Games
Gold medal – first place	2010 Delhi	3000 m st.
Silver medal – second place	2014 Glasgow	3000 m st.

Continental Cup
Silver medal – second place	2010 Split	3000 m st.

Milcah Chemos Cheywa (born 24 February 1986 in Bugaa, Mount Elgon District) is a runner from Kenya who specialises in 3000 metres steeplechase. She was, until 2015, African record holder at the distance and is the gold medalist of the 2013 World Championships in Athletics.

== Early life ==
She is from Bugaa village, but moved to Kitale with her family, where she went to Matumbei and St Phillips primary schools. Later she went to St Claire's Girls High School in Maragoli.

After schooling she went to the Kenya Police College (KPC) in Kiganjo in 2005. There she met Alex Sang and soon married. He urged her to start running, but she did not start serious training until 2008. Initially racing over 800 and 1500 metres, she finished 7th in the 800 metres at the 2008 Kenyan Olympic trials, 12 seconds behind the winner Pamela Jelimo.

== Career ==
=== 2009 ===
Chemos converted to steeplechase running in March 2009, after being introduced by her coach], the Olympic steeplechase medalist posted at KPC. She won her debut race, at the Athletics Kenya meeting in Kakamega, timing 9:54.4, and soon improved her PB to 9:22.33 at the KBC Night of Athletics meeting in Heusden-Zolder, Belgium. Competing in the 2009 World Championships, she won a bronze medal in a personal best 9:08.57, behind Marta Domínguez and Yuliya Zarudneva. Dominguez was disqualified afterward for a doping violation.

=== 2010 ===
In 2010, Chemos won gold medals in the 3000 metre steeplechase at the African Championships and the Commonwealth Games, heading a Kenyan clean sweep of the medals in the latter. She also took Diamond League victories in Oslo, Rome, Eugene and London, en route to capturing the overall Diamond League title in the steeplechase.

As a result of her successes during the 2010 season, Chemos was one of five females shortlisted for the IAAF World Athlete of the Year award, won by high jumper Blanka Vlašić.

=== 2011 ===
Chemos entered the 2011 World Championships in Daegu, South Korea as favourite for the 3000 metres steeplechase, having won all five of the Diamond League races in which she had competed prior to the championship. However, she was unable to improve upon her bronze medal of two years previous, finishing in third place, over 10 seconds behind race winner Yuliya Zaripova. Chemos subsequently lost again to Zaripova at the final Diamond League meeting of the season – the Memorial Van Damme in Brussels – but the Kenyan had already established an unbeatable lead in the Diamond Race standings and thus retained her title.

=== 2012 ===
At the start of 2012, Chemos ran at the Cross de San Sebastián and was the runner-up behind Nazareth Weldu. She began the 2012 IAAF Diamond League season in dominant fashion, winning the steeplechase in Shanghai, Eugene and Oslo. At the third of these victories, Chemos broke the African 3000 metre steeplechase record of Eunice Jepkorir, winning in a new personal best and Bislett Games record time of 9:07.14.

In 2013, she won women's 3000m Steeplechase at the World Athletics Championships, clocking in 9:36.16.

== Personal life ==
Her husband Alex Sang is a middle-distance runner. They have a daughter as of 2010.

Like Milcah, running siblings Linet Masai and Moses Masai are from Bugaa village.

== International competitions ==
Year	Competition	Venue	Position	Event	Notes
2009	World Championships	Berlin, Germany	3rd	3000 m steeplechase	9:08.57
2009	World Athletics Final	Thessaloniki, Greece	2nd	3000 m steeplechase	9:20.19
2010	African Championships	Nairobi, Kenya	1st	3000 m steeplechase	9:32.18 CR
2010	Continental Cup	Split, Croatia	2nd	3000 m steeplechase	9:25.84
2010	Commonwealth Games	New Delhi, India	1st	3000 m steeplechase	9:40.96
2011	World Championships	Daegu, South Korea	3rd	3000 m steeplechase	9:17.16
2012	Olympic Games	London, United Kingdom	3rd	3000 m steeplechase	9:09.88
2013	World Championships	Moscow, Russia	1st	3000 m steeplechase	9:11.65
2014	Commonwealth Games	Glasgow, Scotland	2nd	3000 m steeplechase	9:31.30

== Personal bests ==
Event	Time (m:s)	Venue	Date
1500 metres	4:12.30	Nairobi, Kenya	6 June 2009
3000 metres	8:43.92	Zagreb, Croatia	31 August 2009
3000 m steeplechase	9:07.14	Oslo, Norway	7 June 2012

- All information taken from IAAF profile.
